= 2026 in Philippine television =

The following is a list of events affecting Philippine television in 2026. Events listed include television show debuts, finales, cancellations, and channel launches, closures and rebrandings, as well as information about controversies and carriage disputes.

== Events ==
=== January ===
- January 1
  - After three years and three months of broadcasting, TVUP has ceased its operations by Cignal due to the review of the management's decision through changes in business direction.
  - Celestial Movies Pinoy celebrated its tenth anniversary of broadcasting on cable and satellite television.
  - Cignal terminated two TAP Digital Media Ventures Corporation (TAP DMV) linear channels (TAP Action Flix and TAP TV) on its line-up due to the expiration of Cignal's contract with the networks. Meanwhile, both channels continued to air on Cablelink, Converge Vision, G Sat, Sky Cable, and other cable and satellite providers as well as on its streaming service Blast TV.
  - TV Maria celebrated its 20th anniversary of broadcasting.
- January 2
  - Broadcast Enterprises and Affiliated Media (BEAM) terminated UFC TV on BEAM TV's digital subchannel line-up via DWKC-DTV after four months due to the expiration of its licensing agreement with the network, as the Ultimate Fighting Championship (UFC) had their own subscription-video-on-demand (SVOD) service UFC Fight Pass, that is still available in the country. Meanwhile, the channel continued to stream on TAP Digital Media Ventures Corporation's Blast TV and other cable and satellite providers.
  - In coincidence with ABS-CBN Corporation's 80th anniversary of its original establishment on June 13, 1946, almost 40 years since its re-establishment following People Power Revolution and September 14, 1986, respectively and two years after ABS-CBN's return to Channels 2 and 16 in Mega Manila and regional stations pursuant to the content on April 15, 2024, that evolved into brand licensing agreement on December 17, 2025, between ABS-CBN and Advanced Media Broadcasting System (AMBS), Kapamilya Channel (as ABS-CBN sa ALLTV2) extended its airtime on All TV. The channel began to use a silent break bumper with different animations and visuals but retains a zooming-in at the end, with the 2020 Kapamilya Channel bumpers continued to used. Meanwhile, Jeepney TV continued to on Cignal, Cablelink, Converge Vision/Sky TV, G Sat, Sky Cable, and other cable and satellite providers, iWant, TFC IPTV, and other digital platforms. Two months after on March 16, the channel, along with two ABS-CBN/AMBS/CPI linear platforms (Kapamilya Channel and Kapamilya Online Live) began to use the 2013 ABS-CBN logo on its digital on-screen graphic which again changed its silent bumper together with the main cable and online counterparts after a short-lived usage of Kapamilya Channel sa ALLTV2 bumper.
  - In coinciding with the 60th anniversary on November 21, The World Tonight resumed its free-to-air broadcast through All TV after almost 27 years since its last broadcast on ABS-CBN on August 13, 1999.
  - Movie Central resumed its free-to-air broadcast as a programming block through All TV under Kapamilya Channel sa All TV brand after almost six years since the shutdown of the channel on May 5, 2020. It lasted until the dawn of February 16.
- January 15 – Sari-Sari Channel celebrated its tenth anniversary of broadcasting on cable and satellite television until its cessation on June 1.
- January 17 – The OST Dreamers duo of Arvery Love Lagoring and Christian Tibayan were proclaimed as Tawag ng Tanghalan Duets 2 grand champions on It's Showtime.
- January 25 – MediaQuest Holdings, through Cignal and celebrity businessman Willie Revillame, relaunched WilTV as a television channel until its cessation on May 22.

=== February ===
- February 1
  - Former Tawag ng Tanghalan (season 3) finalist and The Clash (seasons 5 and 7) runner-up Arabelle Dela Cruz won the inaugural edition of the South Korean singing competition show, Veiled Cup.
  - The San Miguel Beermen win the 2025–26 PBA Philippine Cup after defeating TNT Tropang 5G 4–2 in the best-of-seven-game series.
- February 6–23 – The 2026 Winter Olympics were held at the Lombardy and Northeast Italy. MediaQuest Holdings, through Cignal TV and MVP Group of Companies, and their sister companies PLDT-Smart Communications had the rights to the games that aired on five free-to-air/cable and satellite/online linear platforms (One Sports, One Sports+, Cignal Play, Cignal Super and Pilipinas Live).
- February 6 – April 1 – Cignal launched six Television Broadcasts Limited (TVB) linear channels on their line-up by respective date: TVB Jade, TVB Xing He, TVB News and Asian Action Channel on February 6; TVB Entertainment News and TVB Lifestyle on April 1.
- February 8 – GMA Network's app was rebranded into freemium over-the-top media service, GMA Play.
- February 12
  - Ang Dating Daan: Worldwide Bible Study celebrated its 5th anniversary on Philippine television.
  - The Healing Eucharist celebrated its 20th anniversary on Philippine television.
  - GMA Network Turned Into Cartoonito Philippines
- February 14 – Ani-Blast launched as FAST/linear channel through Blast TV (OTT) and Samsung TV Plus (FAST).
- February 21 – Farm to Table celebrated its 5th anniversary on Philippine television.
- February 22 – GTV celebrated its 5th anniversary of broadcasting.
- February 27 – Ang Inyong Kawal celebrated its fifth anniversary on Philippine television.
- February 28
  - Caprice Cayetano of Quezon City and Lella Ford of Tacloban were named winners of Pinoy Big Brother: Celebrity Collab Edition 2.0. This was also their last edition to held at Dilliman in Quezon City after producing eleven regular seasons, four celebrity editions (including two "collab" editions) and four teen editions as it was demolished on March 28.
  - Dobol B TV, iJuander and State of the Nation celebrated its 15th anniversary on Philippine television.

=== March ===
- March 1 – Light TV celebrated its 15th anniversary of broadcasting.
- March 5 – Good News with Vicky Morales celebrated its 15th anniversary on Philippine television.
- March 6 – Converge Vision launched Abante TV on their line-up.
- March 16 – HBO Family and HBO Hits celebrated its 20th anniversary of broadcasting on cable and satellite television.
- March 17 – Cignal launched Setanta Sports on their line-up.
- March 18 – Sky Direct celebrated its tenth anniversary as a direct-broadcast satellite television.
- March 24–27 – iWant launched two channels on their line-up by respective date: Cinema One on March 24 (as cable livestream); CNA and Euronews on March 27.
- March 27 – Cignal launched the ABS-CBN News Channel (ANC) on their line-up in line for its 30th anniversary.
- March 30 – After three years and four months, GMA Network's news department, GMA Integrated News returned to its former name, GMA News, as well as its tagline Serbisyong Totoo being renewed, which had been in use since 2002.

=== April ===
- April 1 – Cignal launched Oras ng Himala Channel on their line-up.
- April 2–4
  - All TV aired its Holy Week special programming Easter Triduum from Kapamilya Channel through ABS-CBN sa ALLTV2 brand under an agreement between ABS-CBN Corporation and Advanced Media Broadcasting System, marking the first time All TV aired this practice since it launched on September 13, 2022 and never used this practice from 2023 to 2025.
  - The Healing Eucharist aired its special liturgical masses during the Paschal Triduum for this year. The Holy Week activities were filmed at the ABS-CBN Chapel of the Annunciation for the last time as the building is among those to be demolished effective August after ABS-CBN and Ayala Land signed a definitive sale for the purchase of the sold properties on August 20, 2025, and it aired simultaneously for three days on eight free-to-air/cable and satellite/online/international linear platforms (A2Z, All TV, iWant, Jeepney TV, Kapamilya Channel, Kapamilya Online Live, Metro Channel and TFC; where the former network has a right of first refusal to carry as part of a programming agreement with ABS-CBN Corporation along with SVD-Mission Communications Foundation's Seven Last Words, due to Jesus Is Lord Church's ownership).
- April 5 – I Heart Movies celebrated its 5th anniversary of broadcasting.
- April 6 – Equip celebrated its 5th anniversary on Philippine television.
- April 10
  - Duolos Cell Celebration celebrated its 5th anniversary on Philippine television.
  - The Benilde Blazing Spikers clinched the NCAA Season 101 men's volleyball championship after defeating the Mapua Cardinals 3–0 in the best-of-three series.
  - The Letran Lady Knights clinched the NCAA Season 101 women's volleyball championship after defeating CSB Lady Blazers 3–2 in the best-of-three series. This was also the last season and game under their broadcast partnership with GMA Network as the network would no longer renew its partnership due to lack of advertisers and shifting viewership habits.
- April 12 – JM Dela Cerna from Davao City and Marielle Montellano from Tabogon, Cebu (impersonated as Jennifer Holliday and Jessica Sanchez respectively) were proclaimed as the fourth season grand winner of Your Face Sounds Familiar.
- April 18 – Magandang Buhay celebrated its 10th anniversary on Philippine television until it concluded on June 26.
- April 20 – G Sat launched Bilyonaryo News Channel on their line-up.
- April 25 – Advanced Media Broadcasting System launched DWOW's "TeleRadyo" channel on Planet Cable's AllRadio TV.
- April 27 – Cignal and Makati Broadcasting Company announced a partnership agreement to launched DotTV on July 8.

=== May ===
- May 1 – The ABS-CBN News Channel celebrated its 30th anniversary of broadcasting on cable and satellite television.
- May 2 – News Light celebrated its 15th anniversary on Philippine television.
- May 4 – Cignal launched the Congress TV and D8TV on their line up.
- May 5 – After 2 years, TV5's talent management and artist development arm, MediaQuest Artists Agency (MQAA) rebranded to Star Worx.
- May 6 – Pinoy Box Office celebrated its 30th anniversary of broadcasting on cable and satellite television.
- May 8 – After 25 years and 8 months of broadcasting in the Philippines, Xing Kong has ceased its operations by Star China Media (a subsidiary of China Media Capital) across Southeast Asia citing operational difficulties on May 6.
- May 9
  - The NU Bulldogs clinched the UAAP Season 88 men's volleyball championship after defeating the FEU Tamaraws 3–0 in a best-of-three-game series.
  - The De La Salle Lady Spikers clinched the UAAP Season 88 women's volleyball championship after defeating the NU Lady Bulldogs 3–0 in a best-of-three-game series.
- May 12 – Aliw Broadcasting Corporation celebrated its 35th anniversary of broadcasting as a radio and television network.
- May 15 – Maalaala Mo Kaya celebrated its 35th anniversary on Philippine television.
- May 17 – ASAP, the country's longest-running musical-variety show, was rebranded into ASAP XP, as the show moved to the Sunday primetime slot after 31 years and 3 months from its noontime slot.
- May 22 – After almost 4 months of broadcasting, WilTV has ceased its operations by MQuest Ventures due to lack of advertising support (mainly because of the online gaming/raffle format) as well as termination of contract by the content provider.
- May 24 – SMNI News Channel celebrated its 10th anniversary of broadcasting on cable and satellite television.
- May 31 – Sugar Mercado and Jeromy of Hori7on were proclaimed as the second season winners of Stars on the Floor.

=== June ===
- June 1
  - After 10 years and 4 months of broadcasting, Sari-Sari Channel has ceased its operations by Cignal and Viva Communications due to a change in business direction, following the resignation of Jane Basas as president and CEO of MediaQuest Holdings on January 9. Although, Ricky Vargas assuming the transitional role of officer-in-charge, and Viva's continuing efforts on its direct-to-consumer service through Viva One and VMX.
  - Cignal and SatLite terminated two linear channels (Pinoy Box Office and Viva Cinema) on its line-up because their partnership with Viva Communications expired on this date. Meanwhile, both channels continued on Cablelink, Converge Vision / Sky TV, G Sat and other cable and satellite providers.
- June 5
  - Blast TV terminated Paramount+ from its content hub due to the expiration of Blast's contract with Paramount Global Content Distribution.
  - Everybody, Sing! celebrated its fifth anniversary on Philippine television.
  - Kapamilya, Deal or No Deal celebrated its 20th anniversary on Philippine television.
  - Sky Direct launched Abante TV and Bilyonaryo News Channel on their line-up.
- June 11 – Ang Tamang Daan celebrated its 25th anniversary on Philippine television.
- June 12 – MBC Media Group celebrated its 80th anniversary of broadcasting as a radio and television network.
- June 12 – July 20 – The 2026 FIFA World Cup took place in Canada, Mexico and the United States. Aleph Group and TAP Digital Media Ventures Corporation awarded the rights to the quadrennial event that that airs on pay-per-view/cable and satellite/online linear platforms (World Cup TV pay-per-view service on cable and satellite providers, Aleph Arena on YouTube and Blast TV).
- June 13
  - ABS-CBN Corporation celebrated its 80th anniversary of original establishment in 1946.
  - Yannie Paul Basical of Balanga, Bataan (Central Luzon) proclaimed as the Tawag ng Tanghalan: Ika-Sampung Taon Grand Champion on It's Showtime.
- June 17 – The Barangay Ginebra San Miguel cinched the 2026 PBA Commissioner's Cup title after defeating TNT Tropang 5G in a winner-take-all seven-game series.
- June 18 – After 5 months on hiatus, ABS-CBN Corporation and PLDT's Beneficial Trust Fund (MediaQuest Holdings through Cignal TV and TV5 Network, Inc.) resumed their content partnership deal for airing newly released ABS-CBN-TV5-produced contents and morning movie block on 6 free-to-air/cable and satellite/online linear platforms (A2Z, All TV, Kapamilya Channel, Kapamilya Online Live (except movie block), TFC and TV5) on June 22.

=== July ===
- July 1 – GMA Network's third international channel GMA News TV International celebrated its 15th anniversary on global television.
- July 3 – Broadcast Enterprises and Affiliated Media celebrated its 15th anniversary of broadcasting.
- July 6 – CLTV 36 began its simulcast of Bilyonaryo News Channel's selected programs.
- July 8 – Dateline Philippines celebrated its 30th anniversary on Philippine television.
- July 11 – TV5's international channels Kapatid International and AksyonTV International celebrated its 15th anniversary on global television.
- July 12 – After almost 21 years of broadcasting, Shop TV ended its broadcast operations by Solar Entertainment Corporation due to changes of broadcast operatons and rebranding. On October 10, Solar Entertainment Corporation relaunched Shop TV into E-Novation TV.
- July 15 – MediaQuest Holdings, through Cignal TV and TV5 Network announced a 2-year deal with the National Collegiate Athletic Association (NCAA) to air the games of the NCAA from seasons 102 and 103 on three free-to-air/cable and satellite/online linear platforms (NCAA Next, One Sports on YouTube and RPTV). The revival broadcast deal succeeded GMA Network (the league's former broadcaster from seasons 96 to 101) following their non-renewal of its broadcast deal due to the lack of sponsorship, and the return of that collegiate league on TV5 Network after 12 years, and once again back-to-back with the University Athletic Association of the Philippines (UAAP, which also renewed their 5-year deal on April 10) on the same network after 7 years since the same collegiate leagues were aired on ABS-CBN Sports from 2002 to 2012 on Studio 23 and again from 2015 to 2019 on S+A, Balls and Liga.
- July 16 – UNTV celebrated its 25th anniversary of broadcasting.
- July 18 – PBA Rush celebrated its 10th anniversary of broadcasting on cable and satellite television.
- July 19 – Team Fantastic Four were proclaimed as first season Grand Champion of Tubig to Handle: What the Fun!.
- July 26 – Balitang A2Z celebrated its 5th anniversary on Philippine television.
- July 28 – The Movie and Television Review and Classification Board (MTRCB) issued a Notice to Appear and Testify to the Producers of ABS-CBN's noontime variety show, It's Showtime over complaints concerning scenes that portrayed alleged "indecent acts" by hosts Vice Ganda and Ion Perez, and the racism joke by the Baby Dolls member Johaira Moris from the former during the variety show's Laro, Laro, Pick segment that aired on July 24.
- July 31
  - After a year and 2 months, Cignal Super has ceased its over-the-top streaming media aggregator by Cignal due to a change in business direction.
  - After 35 years, Cotabato Cable has ceased its operations in Cotabato City.

=== August ===
- August 1–15 – Cignal has ceased its operations on two linear channels by respective date: BuKo on August 1; and True TV on August 15 due to programming redundancies, lack of advertising support and cross-cutting measures as well as the change in business direction with most of the programs from this channel aired on TV5, One PH, RPTV and 105.9 True FM. Meanwhile, True TV migrated from a linear cable channel into a free-to-air digital subchannel of TV5 on August 29 via channel 51.
- August 2 – Content creators David "Abdul" Domanais and Christian "Marsy" Kimp Atip won ₱1 million in the sixth season of Kapamilya Deal or No Deal. They were the first such contestants to win the prize, 10 years after Janine Tugonon's win on January 8, 2016.
- August 13 – Cignal and Prage Management Corporation signed their partnership agreement to launched Abante TV on their channel lineup on August 15.
- August 15 – Cignal terminated two channels: GCTV and SMNI News Channel on its line-up due to the expiration of Cignal's contract with the said networks. Meanwhile, GCTV migrated from a linear cable channel into a digital-only network across social media platforms, while SMNI News Channel continued on other cable and satellite providers. In addition, Cignal launched two channels on their line-up: Abante TV and Studio Universal.
- August 16
  - Cignal Play terminated five HBO linear channels on their lineup (Cinemax, HBO Asia, HBO Family, HBO Hits and HBO Signature) due to the expiration of Cignal's contract with the networks on August 21. Meanwhile, the channels continued on other cable and satellite providers.
  - Ito Ang Tahanan celebrated its 5th anniversary on Philippine television.
- August 21 – Cignal and SatLite terminated five HBO linear channels in the Philippines (Cinemax, HBO, HBO Family, HBO Hits and HBO Signature) from its channel lineup due to the expiration of Cignal's contract with HBO Asia from its originally schedule on September 1 and discontinued HBO Max from its add-on/bundle services.
- August 24 – After 3 years and two months, Pilipinas Live (a local and global sports broadcasting brand owned by Cignal), has been absorbed into the new Cignal Play. As part of the restructuring changes in OTT service, the live and VOD sports retained, and offered with real-time news, movies and series in their lineup.
- August 27 – Sunday's Best celebrated its 20th anniversary on Philippine television.
- August 28 – Cignal returned beIN Sports channels on their lineup.
- August 29 – One PH resumed its free-to-air broadcast through TV5's digital subchannel via channel 51 after nearly 2 years and 8 months of hiatus.
- August 30 – Kada Umaga and Negosyuniversity celebrated its 5th anniversary on Philippine television.

=== September ===
- September 6 – Hannah May Aladin of Pangasinan emerged as the grand champion of The Clash Teens.
- September 7 – In coinciding with opening of NCAA Season 102 on September 13, Cignal TV, in partnership with National Collegiate Athletic Association, formally launched its 2nd collegiate sports channel on Philippine television, NCAA NXT.
- September 8
  - Thai side EST Cola clinched the 2026 Premier Volleyball League Invitational Conference after defeating the Nxled Chameleons 3–0 at the Araneta Coliseum in Quezon City, made them the second non-Filipino team to win a PVL championship.
  - UAAP Varsity Channel celebrated its 5th anniversary of broadcasting on cable and satellite television.
- September 10 – October 4 – The 2026 Asian Games took place in Japan. MediaQuest Holdings, through Cignal TV and MVP Group of Companies, awarded the rights to the quadrennial event that will air games on five free-to-air/cable and satellite/online linear platforms (Cignal Play, One Sports including their Facebook and YouTube, One Sports+ and RPTV).
- September 11 – Regal Studio Presents celebrated its 5th anniversary on Philippine television.
- September 12 – Barangay Love Stories, a radio drama anthology and podcast hosted by Papa Dudut on Barangay LS 97.1 debuted its television adaptation.
- September 14 – ABS-CBN Corporation celebrated its 40th anniversary of re-establishment following the People Power Revolution.
- September 15 – In coinciding with the 10th anniversary, MediaQuest Holdings, through Cignal TV extended their 3-year deal with both Premier Volleyball League and Spikers' Turf to aired the games throughout the 2028–29 season on three free-to-air/cable and satellite/online linear platforms (Cignal Play, One Sports including their YouTube and One Sports+).
- September 27 – Frontline Tonight celebrated its 5th anniversary on Philippine television.
- September 30 – Intercontinental Broadcasting Corporation terminated DWAN TV on their digital subchannel line-up via Channel 17 after two years and 3 months and was replaced by Senate TV. Meanwhile, the channel continued to air via live streaming on Facebook and YouTube.

=== October ===
- October 1
  - All pay television operators and providers in the Philippines have added or terminated a number of various channels and networks on their respective listing line-ups.
  - Cignal and SatLite terminated two remaining Viva Communications linear channels (Celestial Movies Pinoy and Tagalized Movie Channel) on its line-up because their partnership with Viva Communications expired on June 1. Meanwhile, both channels continued on Converge Vision / Sky TV, G Sat and other cable and satellite providers.
  - Premier Sports, TAP Action Flix and TAP Movies celebrated their fifth anniversary of broadcasting on cable and satellite television.
  - The Government of the Philippines (Senate of the Philippines) through the subchannel of Intercontinental Broadcasting Corporation launched Senate TV on channel 17 (digital), replacing DWAN TV. The channel was officially launched on October 27.
- October 6 – The Movie and Television Review and Classification Board (MTRCB) Classification ratings celebrated its 15th anniversary of broadcasting the local channels.
- October 7 – Disney+ in the Philippines migrated from Hotstar-derived version of the app to the global version. The new version now includes ESPN as an additional content hub on soft launch.
- October 8 - After sixteen years, TV5's news department, News5 rebranded into TV5 News.
- October 11
  - Disney+ began streaming its own coverage of the Ultimate Fighting Championship.
  - ABS-CBN Studios and TV5 Network, Inc. jointly to co-produced for the weekly-primetime variety show ASAP XP effective October 18, marking the return of the program to TV5 after 10 months since their partnership agreement went on 6-month hiatus.
- October 18
  - Ano sa Palagay N'yo? celebrated its 5th anniversary on Philippine television.
  - Oras ng Katotohanan celebrated its 35th anniversary on Philippine television.
- October 19 – Disney+ formally launched ESPN as a sports content hub.
- October 24 – Mata ng Agila celebrated its 15th anniversary on Philippine television.
- October 29 – GMA Network celebrated its 65th anniversary of broadcasting as a television network.
- October 31 – Interactive Broadcast Media celebrated its 30th anniversary of broadcasting as a radio and television network.

=== November ===
- November 1 – Highland TV and Veritas TV Radyo celebrated its fifth anniversary of broadcasting.
- November 7 – Responde celebrated its 15th anniversary on Philippine television.
- November 11 – Viva Communications celebrated its 45th anniversary as a media and entertainment company.
- November 14 – Tawag ng Tanghalan grand champion Carmelle Collado won the inagural edition of Eurovision Song Contest Asia.
- November 15
  - Cignal and SatLite launched DZMM TeleRadyo on their line-up in line for its 20th anniversary on April 12, 2027.
  - Ulat A2Z celebrated its 5th anniversary on Philippine television.
- November 19 – Family Feud celebrated its 25th anniversary on Philippine television.
- November 21
  - Tara Game, Agad Agad! celebrated its 5th anniversary on Philippine television.
  - The World Tonight celebrated its 60th anniversary as the longest-running English-language newscast on Philippine television since it premiered in 1966.

=== Ongoing ===
- October 2 – December 30 – Four major local and collegiate basketball leagues (NCAA Season 102, 2026 MPBL season, UAAP Season 89, and the 2026 PBA Governors' Cup) currently hold their respective playoffs, with the championship series taking place from December 4 to 30. This marks a December finale for the leagues after 27 years since the 1999 MBA Season ended on December 8, 1999, and the 1999 PBA season ended on December 12, 1999.

== Debuts ==
=== Major networks ===
==== A2Z ====
The following are programs that debuted on A2Z:

- January 17: S.O.C.O.: Scene of the Crime Operatives (2nd incarnation; season 1)
- March 16: Love Scout and The Alibi: Ang Buong Katotohanan
- April 6: Blood vs Duty
- April 13: Fireworks of My Heart
- April 18: S.O.C.O.: Scene of the Crime Operatives (2nd incarnation; season 2)
- April 25: Kapamilya, Deal or No Deal (season 6)
- May 2: Everybody, Sing! (season 4)
- May 4: Queen Mantis
- May 17: Sunday Noontime Blockbusters
- May 23: Tubig to Handle: What the Fun! (season 1)
- May 25: Love Your Enemy
- June 22: Sigabo
- June 29: Blockbusters sa Umaga and Oh My Gan!
- July 25: Ibang Level 'To!
- July 27: A Secret in Prague, My Bespren Emman and Someone, Someday
- August 2: Kuan on One (season 5)
- August 17: Falling into Your Smile
- September 5: Baby Einstein, Miss Behave, Philippines' Oddest Jobs and Tulipop
- September 6: Philippines' Most Shocking Stories (season 1)
- September 26: Crayon Shin-chan
- October 5: The Loyalty Game: Level Up
- October 19: Mommy Guard
- October 25: Philippines' Most Haunted, Sunday Blockbusters (2nd incarnation) and Vibe Plus Playback
- November 7: Lego City Adventures
- November 23: Breeze by the Sea

==== Upcoming ====
- November 30: iWant Originals (weeknight edition)

===== Re-runs =====
- February 2: Minute to Win It (season 1)^{1}
- February 9: The Forbidden Flower
- March 23: Can't Buy Me Love
- May 4: High Street
- July 28: Happiness
- October 5: What Lies Beneath
- October 10: Matteo G. Primetime^{2}

Notes

1. ^ ^{a} Originally aired on ABS-CBN (now Kapamilya Channel)
2. ^ ^{b} Originally aired on Bilyonaryo News Channel

==== All TV ====
The following are programs that debuted on All TV:

- January 2: FPJ's Batang Quiapo, Go Ahead, Kapamilya Blockbusters (weekday edition), Kapamilya Daily Mass, Kapamilya Gold Hits, Knowledge Channel School Anywhere, Movie Central Presents, Roja, Superbook Reimagined (season 5), The World Tonight and What Lies Beneath
- January 3: Bubu and the Little Owls, Dinoman, Kapamilya Action Sabado, KB Family Weekend, News Patrol, Super Kapamilya Blockbusters, Tao Po! and Your Face Sounds Familiar (season 4)
- January 4: ASAP (3rd incarnation), Kuan on One (seasons 3 and 4), Mega Blockbusters, My Puhunan: Kaya Mo!, Sunday Blockbusters, Sunday's Best, The Healing Eucharist and TV Patrol Regional (2nd incarnation)
- January 17: S.O.C.O.: Scene of the Crime Operatives (2nd incarnation; season 1)
- March 16: Love Scout and The Alibi: Ang Buong Katotohanan
- April 6: Blood vs Duty
- April 13: Fireworks of My Heart
- April 18: S.O.C.O.: Scene of the Crime Operatives (2nd incarnation; season 2)
- April 25: Kapamilya, Deal or No Deal (season 6)
- May 2: Everybody, Sing! (season 4)
- May 4: Queen Mantis
- May 9: Y Speak 2.0
- May 17: Sunday Noontime Blockbusters
- May 23: Tubig to Handle: What the Fun! (season 1)
- May 25: Love Your Enemy
- June 22: Sigabo
- June 29: Blockbusters sa Umaga, Face to Face with Ate Koring and Oh My Gan!
- July 11: Dapat Legal and Sagot ni Doc
- July 25: Ibang Level 'To!
- July 27: A Secret in Prague, My Bespren Emman and Someone, Someday
- August 2: Kuan on One (season 5)
- August 17: Falling into Your Smile
- September 5: Baby Einstein, Miss Behave, Philippines' Oddest Jobs and Tulipop
- September 6: Philippines' Most Shocking Stories (season 1)
- September 26: Crayon Shin-chan
- October 5: The Loyalty Game: Level Up
- October 12: Gandang Mornings with Ate Koring
- October 19: Mommy Guard
- October 25: Philippines' Most Haunted, Sunday Blockbusters (2nd incarnation) and Vibe Plus Playback
- November 7: Lego City Adventures
- November 23: Breeze by the Sea

==== Upcoming ====
- November 30: iWant Originals (weeknight edition)

===== Re-runs =====
- January 2: 100 Days to Heaven^{1}^{5}, Kapamilya, Deal or No Deal (season 4)^{1}, Lavender Fields^{3}^{5}^{6}^{7}, Senior High^{3}^{5}^{6}^{7}, and The Flying House^{1}^{2}^{4}^{8}^{9}
- January 3: Team Yey!^{4}
- January 19: Komiks Presents^{1}^{4}
- February 2: Minute to Win It (season 1)^{1}
- February 9: The Forbidden Flower^{3}^{6}^{7}
- March 23: Can't Buy Me Love^{3}^{5}^{6}^{7}
- May 4: High Street^{3}^{5}^{6}^{7}
- July 28: Happiness^{3}^{6}^{7}
- October 5: What Lies Beneath
- October 10: Matteo G. Primetime^{10}

Notes

1. ^ ^{a} Originally aired on ABS-CBN (now Kapamilya Channel)
2. ^ ^{b} Originally aired on GMA
3. ^ ^{c} Originally aired on TV5
4. ^ ^{d} Originally aired on Yey!
5. ^ ^{e} Originally aired on Jeepney TV
6. ^ ^{f} Originally aired on Kapamilya Channel
7. ^ ^{g} Originally aired on A2Z
8. ^ ^{h} Originally aired on Light TV
9. ^ ^{i} Originally aired on ZOE TV (now Light TV)
10. ^ ^{j} Originally aired on Bilyonaryo News Channel

==== GMA ====
The following are programs that debuted on GMA Network:

- January 5: Delightfully Deceitful
- January 19: House of Lies
- February 2: Astrophile and Never Say Die
- February 15: Stars on the Floor (season 2)
- March 1: TBATS On the Go
- March 2: Apoy sa Dugo and The Secrets of Hotel 88
- March 7: Heart World (season 2) and Oscar's Oasis
- March 16: The Sweetest Taboo
- March 23: Born to Shine
- March 30: 23:23 and My Love in the Countryside
- April 2: GMA News Bulletin
- April 19: Midnight Museum
- April 26: Transformers: EarthSpark
- May 2: Farm to Table and Planet XP
- May 11: The Master Cutter (seasons 1 and 2)
- May 16: Jujutsu Kaisen (season 2)
- May 25: Kamao, Lovers of the Red Sky and Taskforce Firewall
- June 6: The People Have Spoken
- June 7: The Clash Teens
- June 15: Exclusive Fairytale and You Touched My Heart
- June 22: You're My Favorite Song
- June 29: Duty After School and Ratsada Balita (GMA Iloilo)
- August 10: Innocent Lies
- August 15: Zombiedumb
- August 17: Branding in Seongsu and Kamen Rider Geats
- September 7: The Kinnaree Conspiracy
- September 12: Barangay Love Stories
- September 13: Gandang Gabi, Vice! (season 9) and The Voice Kids (season 8)
- September 28: Arthdal Chronicles and Love, Siargao
- October 19: Delivery Boi
- October 24: Pinoy Big Brother: Collab 3.0
- November 16: My Sassy Girl

===== Re-runs =====
- January 4: Voltes V^{1}^{4}^{8}^{11}^{12}
- January 12/August 9: Kamen Rider Saber
- January 18: Doors^{3}
- February 2: The Cheery Lee, Village Headman
- February 8: The Bible^{1}
- February 14: Wagas^{2}
- March 23: Mako Mermaids
- April 5: Knockout^{3}^{10} and The New Legends of Monkey^{3}
- April 11: Haikyu!! (season 1)^{1}^{4}^{5}
- April 20: Hidden Love (Chinese adaptation)
- May 31: Yo-kai Watch!
- June 11: Wolfblood
- June 15: Slam Dunk^{3}^{9}
- June 21: Power Rangers Beast Morphers
- June 22: The Lovely Runner
- June 28: Just for Laughs Gags^{3}^{6}^{7}^{8}
- June 29: First Yaya
- July 26: Kuroko's Basketball (season 1)^{1}^{4}^{5}
- August 3: Maria Clara at Ibarra
- August 31: The Baker King
- October 26: Mako Mermaids^{3}

Notes

1. ^ ^{a} Originally aired on ABS-CBN (now Kapamilya Channel)
2. ^ ^{b} Originally aired on GMA News TV (now GTV)
3. ^ ^{c} Originally aired on GTV
4. ^ ^{d} Originally aired on Hero
5. ^ ^{e} Originally aired on Yey!
6. ^ ^{f} Originally aired on Q (now GTV)
7. ^ ^{g} Originally aired on Jack TV
8. ^ ^{h} Originally aired on RPN (now RPTV)
9. ^ ^{i} Originally aired on ABC (now TV5)
10. ^ ^{j} Originally aired on TeleAsia Filipino
11. ^ ^{k} Originally aired on PTV
12. ^ ^{l} Originally aired on IBC

==== TV5 ====
The following are programs that debuted on TV5:

- January 2: Cine Cinco Primetime
- January 19: Kapatid Dokyu
- January 31: America's Got Talent (season 20)
- February 7: From Helen's Kitchen (season 5)
- February 16: Chibi Maruko-chan
- March 1: TikTalks (season 3)
- March 2: Mga Kuwentong MX3
- March 8: Kapatid Sunday Specials
- March 9: Reborn Rich
- March 16: Face to Face with Ate Koring
- April 25: Ogie Diaz Inspires
- April 27: A Secret in Prague, My Bespren Emman and The Story of Park's Marriage Contract
- May 11: The Empire
- May 23: Project Loki
- May 24: Kumusta
- June 22: Sigabo
- June 29: Blockbusters sa Umaga
- July 4: Everybody, Sing! (season 4) and Kapamilya, Deal or No Deal (season 6)
- July 5: The Singing Lodi
- July 11: Vibe+
- July 27: Someone, Someday
- August 10: Frontline sa Umaga (2nd incarnation)
- October 5: The Loyalty Game: Level Up
- October 10: Maalaala Mo Kaya: Hugot from The Vault
- October 12: Gandang Mornings with Ate Koring
- October 19: Mommy Guard
- November 14: American Idol (season 24)

==== Upcoming ====
- November 30: iWant Originals (weeknight edition)

===== Re-runs =====
- January 3: Kagat ng Dilim (2020)
- January 4: Padyak Princess and TikTalks (season 1)
- January 19: Nag-aapoy Na Damdamin and Pira-Pirasong Paraiso
- March 2: Prinsipe Cedie^{1}^{3}
- March 7: Jack and Jill sa Diamond Hills and John en Ellen
- March 8: #ParangNormal Activity
- March 9: Sky Castle^{2}^{5} and The World of the Married^{4}
- April 11: Midnight DJ
- May 2: Dog of Flanders^{1}^{3}
- May 18: Cooking Master Boy^{1}^{3}
- June 8: Knight Rider^{2}^{7}^{8}
- June 14: Little Princess Sarah^{1}^{3}^{9}
- June 29: Mano Po Legacy: The Family Fortune^{2}
- August 8: The Adventures of Tom Sawyer^{1}^{3}^{4}
- August 15: Mano Po Legacy: Her Big Boss^{2}
- September 7: Minute to Win It (season 1)^{1}
- September 21: Cassandra: Warrior Angel
- October 5: Suntok sa Buwan
- October 10: Matteo G. Primetime^{10}
- October 19: Jasmine
- November 2: Mga Nagbabagang Bulaklak
- November 9: Felina: Prinsesa ng mga Pusa

Notes

1. ^ ^{a} Originally aired on ABS-CBN (now Kapamilya Channel)
2. ^ ^{b} Originally aired on GMA
3. ^ ^{c} Originally aired on Yey!
4. ^ ^{d} Originally aired on Kapamilya Channel
5. ^ ^{e} Originally aired on Heart of Asia
6. ^ ^{f} Originally aired on Studio 23 (now Aliw 23)
7. ^ ^{g} Originally aired on RPN (now RPTV)
8. ^ ^{h} Originally aired on PTV
9. ^ ^{i} Originally aired on Q (now GTV)
10. ^ ^{j} Originally aired on Bilyonaryo News Channel

=== State-owned networks ===
==== PTV ====
The following are programs that debuted on People's Television Network:

==== IBC ====
The following are programs that debuted on IBC:

- January 14: Bangon Bagong Pilipinas
- February 2: Treze sa Tanghali
- February 13: Chairman’s Report with Dante "Klink" Ang (season 4)
- February 14: Cooltura (season 3)
- February 16: Treze Express
- March 7: In Converzation
- March 14: Good Stories (season 1)
- April 10: Public Matters
- April 13: Treze Mornings and Tutok Treze
- April 17: Naked Minds (season 1)
- April 19: Dok True Ba? (season 4)
- April 29: Voices of Hope
- May 8: ResTOURant (season 5)
- June 6: Gov on the Move (season 1)
- July 24: Kalye Sining (season 2)
- September 5: Masters of the Game (2nd incarnation)
- September 6: Legally Speaking (season 3)
- September 11: Chairman’s Report with Dante "Klink" Ang (season 5)
- October 9: Matatanda Ating Mahalin
- October 30: Naked Minds (season 2)
- November 7: Gov on the Move (season 2)
- November 13: ResTOURant (season 6)
- November 21: Bantay Kalusugan with Doc Nanay and Good Stories (season 2)

=== Minor networks ===
The following are the programs that debuted on minor networks:

- January 5: Meet Yourself on Net 25
- February 9: Hi Venus on Net 25
- February 14: All About Dogs with Jamie on RJ DigiTV
- March 9: Tulay Pilipino on Aliw 23
- March 9: You Are My Hero on Net 25
- March 21: Walang Bolahan on Aliw 23
- March 28: Word Hub: Wonders of Word City on Net 25
- May 18: Asintado... Ciento Por Ciento, Awit Para Sa'yo, Chizmax to the Max, Hataw Na... Umaga Na!, Music of Your Life and Sentimental Mornings on Aliw 23
- May 23: DWIZ Reporter's Hour, DWIZ Todo Balita Sabado, Golden Melodies, Himig at Balita, KanTanghalian and Weekend-Tahan on Aliw 23
- May 24: Beautiful Sunday, DWIZ Todo Balita Linggo, Jukebox Weekends, Mag-Agri Tayo, Quiapo Church and Sunday's Weekend Delight on Aliw 23
- May 25: Wonderful Mama on Net 25
- June 6: Chika Vlog on Aliw 23
- June 8: Me and My Music on Aliw 23
- June 15: Night Talks and Radyo IZtorya on Aliw 23
- July 6: Agenda, On Point and The Spokes on CLTV 36
- July 9: Negosyo PH: From Idea to Kita on Aliw 23
- July 11: Agenda Weekend, Memo with Korina and Wellness is Wealth on CLTV 36
- July 12: Go Rampa with Me, The Daily Dish and The Scorecard on CLTV 36
- July 18: Tinig ng OFW on Aliw 23
- July 20: Aksyon Agad! on Aliw 23
- July 20: My Love, Madame Butterfly on Net 25
- August 3: Resbak on Net 25
- October 2: Legally Funny on Net 25
- October 3: Chika Ko on Aliw 23
- October 4: Musiklaseko and Pinoy Okay Ka on Aliw 23
- October 6: The Operator on Net 25
- October 9: The Meow Meow Late Night Show with Kiko Barzaga on Net 25
- October 15: Responde sa Primetime on Net 25
- November 8: Check-Up Podcast on UNTV

==== Re-runs ====
- April 13: Rising With the Wind on Net 25
- May 11: Kimchi Family on Net 25

=== Other channels ===
The following are programs that debuted on other channels:

- January 3: Create, Frontline Pilipinas Weekend, Kapatid Mo, Idol Raffy Tulfo, One Balita Bai and Vibe TV on Kapatid Channel
- January 4: Go Local, Masaganang Buhay, Sunday Mass (Veritas) and Vibe on Kapatid Channel
- January 17: S.O.C.O.: Scene of the Crime Operatives (2nd incarnation; season 1) on Kapamilya Channel
- January 25: The Secret of Health on DZMM TeleRadyo and PRTV Prime Media
- January 25: Wilyonaryo on WilTV
- February 2: Treze sa Tanghali on Congress TV and DWAN TV
- February 2: Metro Escape, Pasyal Tayo, Radyo Drama sa TV and Walang Bola, Puro Tama on D8TV
- February 2: Never Say Die on GTV
- February 2: Perfect Mornings on One PH
- February 3: Tara, Food Trip on D8TV
- February 4: Agapay: Tatak Rosa Rosal on D8TV
- February 5: Jazz Girls on D8TV
- February 7: From Helen's Kitchen (season 5) on RPTV
- February 8: Kawangga Warriors on D8TV
- February 16: Master's Daughter on GTV
- February 23: Shift Happens on Bilyonaryo News Channel
- February 28: TikTalks (season 3) on One News
- March 1: TikTalks (season 3) on One PH
- March 2: Pasada Balita on DZMM TeleRadyo
- March 2: The Secrets of Hotel 88 on GTV
- March 7: In Converzation on Congress TV
- March 7: Mari-Tres and S.O.C.O. sa DZMM (2nd incarnation) on DZMM TeleRadyo
- March 7: S.O.C.O. sa DZMM (2nd incarnation) on PRTV Prime Media
- March 8: D8TV All Access on D8TV
- March 9: D8 Patrol on D8TV
- March 9: Tulay Pilipino on DWIZ News TV
- March 14: Kaagapay sa Kalusugan and Mutya ng Masa (2nd incarnation) on DZMM TeleRadyo and PRTV Prime Media
- March 16: Love Scout and The Alibi: Ang Buong Katotohanan on Jeepney TV and Kapamilya Channel
- March 21: Walang Bolahan on DWIZ News TV
- March 21: Wais Konsyumer (2nd incarnation) on DZMM TeleRadyo and PRTV Prime Media
- March 23: Willingly Yours (2nd incarnation) on WilTV
- April 5: GMA News Bulletin on GTV
- April 6: Blood vs Duty on Jeepney TV and Kapamilya Channel
- April 8: Power Shift on Bilyonaryo News Channel
- April 10: The B Side (season 3) on Cinema One
- April 10: Alam Mo Dapat! on D8TV
- April 10: Public Matters on Congress TV
- April 11: Matteo G. Primetime on Bilyonaryo News Channel
- April 13: Hoy Listen on Abante TV
- April 13: A.S.K. All Should Know, Treze Express, Treze Mornings and Tutok Treze on DWAN TV
- April 13: Fireworks of My Heart on Kapamilya Channel
- April 18: Balitaktakan: Tinig ng Kinabukasan (season 1), Chairman’s Report with Dante “Klink” Ang, Cooltura (season 3), Good Stories (season 1), Kalye Sining (season 1) and Naked Minds (season 1) on DWAN TV
- April 18: S.O.C.O.: Scene of the Crime Operatives (2nd incarnation; season 2) on Kapamilya Channel
- April 18: WRIZZARDS: Underground Uprising on Myx
- April 19: Go Rampa with Me and Wellness is Wealth on Bilyonaryo News Channel
- April 19: Ang Senado ng Pilipinas, Bagong Pilipinas, PBBM: Lingkod ng Bayan, Dok True Ba? (season 4) and Sayanista on DWAN TV
- April 23: Legally Speaking (season 1) on DWAN TV
- April 25: Impact Challenge on ANC
- April 25: Dapat Legal, Dula ng Buhay, Hoopsmayhem, Living Asia Channel, Pinoy All, Sagot ni Doc, The Pillow Talk and Ulirat sa Pagkahimbing on AllRadio TV
- April 25: Roomies on D8TV
- April 25: Kapamilya, Deal or No Deal (season 6) on Kapamilya Channel
- April 26: All Praise, Holy Mass, Mindanow Network, The Retrospect Show with JMRTN and Vinyl Sundays on AllRadio TV
- April 26: Boarding Haus on D8TV
- April 27: All Dance, All Easy, All Hits 25, All Pinoy, All Pop and All TV News: Mabilis Lang 'To on AllRadio TV
- April 27: The Twist of Fate (ETCerye) on SolarFlix
- May 1: ANC Headlines (2nd incarnation) on ANC
- May 2: TrendJing on DZMM TeleRadyo and PRTV Prime Media
- May 2: Everybody, Sing! (season 4) on Kapamilya Channel
- May 4: Metro Morning, Memo with Korina and Tonite on Abante TV
- May 4: Metro Morning, Memo with Korina, Midday Report and Unpopular Opinion on Bilyonaryo News Channel
- May 4: Queen Mantis on Jeepney TV and Kapamilya Channel
- May 4: A Secret in Prague and My Bespren Emman on One PH
- May 4: Balita Alas Tres, LSS: Love Stories & Songs and True Confessions on True TV
- May 7: Hawak Mo Ang Beat: Legis Recap on D8TV
- May 9: Y Speak 2.0 on Kapamilya Channel
- May 9: Vibe on One PH
- May 10: Ang Maging Pilipino on D8TV
- May 11: The Master Cutter (seasons 1 and 2) on GTV
- May 13: Negoskarte on D8TV
- May 17: Sunday Noontime Blockbusters on Kapamilya Channel
- May 18: Asintado... Ciento Por Ciento, Awit Para Sa'yo, Chizmax to the Max, Hataw Na... Umaga Na!, Music of Your Life and Sentimental Mornings on DWIZ News TV
- May 18: One NewsFeed, Political Beat and Sa Totoo Lang on One News
- May 23: DWIZ Reporter's Hour, DWIZ Todo Balita Sabado, Golden Melodies, Himig at Balita, KanTanghalian and Weekend-Tahan on DWIZ News TV
- May 23: Tubig to Handle: What the Fun! (season 1) on Kapamilya Channel
- May 24: Beautiful Sunday, DWIZ Todo Balita Linggo, Jukebox Weekends, Mag-Agri Tayo, Quiapo Church and Sunday's Weekend Delight on DWIZ News TV
- May 25: Taskforce Firewall on GTV
- May 25: Love Your Enemy on Jeepney TV and Kapamilya Channel
- May 25: The Lovely Show on One News and One PH
- May 28: Metro Home on ANC
- May 30: Juan Conversations on ANC
- June 2: Señor Balita on DWAN TV
- June 6: Sports Now Weekend on Abante TV
- June 6: Gov on the Move (season 1) on DWAN TV
- June 6: Chika Vlog on DWIZ News TV
- June 8: Me and My Music on DWIZ News TV
- June 9: Balita Pa More! on DWAN TV
- June 11: Legally Speaking (season 2) on DWAN TV
- June 13: NegoSiyensya (season 1) on GTV
- June 13: Patriots on One News
- June 14: Kwento Juan on D8TV
- June 14: Business Matters (season 13) on GTV
- June 14: Patriots on One PH
- June 15: Night Talks and Radyo IZtorya on DWIZ News TV
- June 20: In Converzation on DWAN TV
- June 22: The AI Talks with The Voice Master on D8TV
- June 22: Sigabo on Kapamilya Channel
- June 26: The Way Forward (season 4) on RPTV
- June 29: Direksyon on DWAN TV
- June 29: Taskforce Firewall and The Master Cutter (seasons 1 and 2) on Heart of Asia and I Heart Movies
- June 29: Blockbusters sa Umaga, Face to Face with Ate Koring and Oh My Gan! on Kapamilya Channel
- July 4: Popoy Lupoy on D8TV
- July 4: Inays, Level Up! on One PH and True TV
- July 6: 13 News and Malending Gabby, Bayan! on DWAN TV
- July 6: Good Morning Bayan and Sana Lourd on One PH
- July 6: One Balita Pilipinas, Perfect Mornings and Storycon on True TV
- July 10: Negosyo PH: From Idea to Kita on RPTV
- July 11: Bilyonaryo Quiz B (season 2) on Bilyonaryo News Channel
- July 11: Vibe+ on Kapatid Channel, One PH and True TV
- July 11: Fil Am Creative: Reach Out and Myx Olympics on Myx
- July 14: What's the Point? on Bilyonaryo News Channel
- July 18: Tinig ng OFW on DWIZ News TV
- July 19: Agenda North America on Bilyonaryo News Channel
- July 20: Aganda on Bilyonaryo News Channel
- July 20: Aksyon Agad! on DWIZ News TV
- July 23: Jess Asking on PRTV Prime Media
- July 25: Intimatalk and Riding Tandem on Abante News TV
- July 25: Kalye Sining (season 2) on DWAN TV
- July 25: Ibang Level 'To! on Kapamilya Channel
- July 26: Shifting Gears on Bilyonaryo News Channel
- July 27: A Secret in Prague, My Bespren Emman and Someone, Someday on Kapamilya Channel
- August 2: Misa sa Abante on Abante News TV
- August 2: Kuan on One (season 5) on Kapamilya Channel
- August 8: 24K with Korina Sanchez-Roxas on Bilyonaryo News Channel
- August 8: Celeste Unscripted on GTV
- August 10: The Boardroom on ANC
- August 10: Frontline sa Umaga (2nd incarnation) on Kapatid Channel and RPTV
- August 10: Amoy Chico on One PH and True TV
- August 11: Startup on ANC
- August 15: Tara, Game! on DZMM TeleRadyo and PRTV Prime Media
- August 16: Buhay at Kalusugan and Dekalibreng Balita on DZMM TeleRadyo and PRTV Prime Media
- August 17: Falling into Your Smile on Kapamilya Channel
- September 5: TeleTabloid Weekend on Abante News TV
- September 5: Masters of the Game (2nd incarnation) on DWAN TV
- September 5: Baby Einstein, Miss Behave, Philippines' Oddest Jobs and Tulipop on Kapamilya Channel
- September 6: Philippines' Most Shocking Stories (season 1) on Kapamilya Channel
- September 10: Legally Speaking (season 3) on DWAN TV
- September 12: Chairman’s Report with Dante "Klink" Ang (season 5) on DWAN TV
- September 12: One Balita Pilipinas Weekend on One News and One PH
- September 13: Kalurks! on GTV
- September 14: The Commanders on Abante News TV and Bilyonaryo News Channel
- September 14: Usap-usapan: What We Know So Far on GTV
- September 16: Basketbolan Noon at Ngayon on Abante News TV
- September 19: Panciteria Aroma on Abante News TV
- September 19: The Situation Report Weekend on DZRH TV
- September 19: Siyensikat (season 7) on GTV
- September 20: Bankero Unfiltered on Bilyonaryo News Channel
- September 22: Net Flicks on Abante News TV
- September 26: Crayon Shin-chan on Kapamilya Channel
- September 27: Sports Ambush and Wakasan on Abante News TV
- September 27: After Hours, Sports Ambush and The Semerads on Bilyonaryo News Channel
- September 28: Chika Cart and Love, Siargao on GTV
- October 3: Chika Ko on DWIZ TV
- October 4: Musiklaseko and Pinoy Okay Ka on DWIZ TV
- October 5: Abante Pilipinas (3rd incarnation) on Abante News TV
- October 5: The Loyalty Game: Level Up on Kapamilya Channel
- October 8: Unfiltered on D8TV
- October 9: Sports Confidential on Abante News TV
- October 9: Matatanda Ating Mahalin on Congress TV
- October 10: Abante Pilipinas Weekend (2nd incarnation) on Abante News TV
- October 10: E-Novation TV on SolarFlix and Solar Sports
- October 12: Gandang Mornings with Ate Koring on Kapamilya Channel
- October 19: Unang Banat on Abante News TV
- October 19: Mommy Guard on Kapamilya Channel
- October 25: Philippines' Most Haunted, Sunday Blockbusters (2nd incarnation) and Vibe Plus Playback on Kapamilya Channel
- October 26: Ang Gwenda Natin on D8TV
- November 7: Lego City Adventures on Kapamilya Channel
- November 9: Pilipinas News Update on PRTV Prime Media
- November 14: Police Line on Abante News TV
- November 14: Radyo Patrol Balita Sabado on DZMM TeleRadyo
- November 21: Bantay Kalusugan with Doc Nanay on Congress TV
- November 23: Breeze by the Sea on Kapamilya Channel

==== Upcoming ====
- November 30: iWant Originals (weeknight edition) on Kapamilya Channel

==== Re-runs ====
- January 3: Agham, Inc.^{30}, Ate ng Ate Ko^{3}^{30}, Gretchen Ho Reports^{36}^{38}, John en Ellen^{3}^{37}, Kuwentong Gilas^{3} and Mac and Chiz^{3}^{9}^{37} on Kapatid Channel
- January 4: Dr. Stone and The Amazing Spiez! on GTV^{2}
- January 4: Boy For Rent^{26} and Queen of Masks^{2} on Heart of Asia
- January 4: Gus Abelgas Forensics^{3}^{38} and Pinoy Explorer^{3} on Kapatid Channel
- January 5: Curtain Call on Heart of Asia^{2}
- January 10: From the Heart Specials: The Best Ending on Heart of Asia
- January 12: An Oriental Odyssey and Wicked-in-Law on Heart of Asia^{2}
- January 19: Dinofroz on Heart of Asia^{2}^{26}
- January 19: Komiks Presents on Kapamilya Channel^{1}^{5}
- January 24: Still and Tokyo Revengers on Heart of Asia^{2}^{26}
- January 24: Saan Ka Man Naroroon on Jeepney TV^{1}
- January 26: Behind Your Smile on Heart of Asia^{26}
- January 26: Kahit Isang Saglit^{1}^{35}, Langit Lupa^{1}^{35}, Mutya^{1} and Precious Hearts Romances Presents: Kristine^{1} on Jeepney TV
- January 31: Playhouse on Jeepney TV^{1}
- February 2: Minute to Win It (season 1) on Kapamilya Channel^{1}
- February 2: MedTalk Health Talk on RPTV^{24}
- February 7: Komiks: Da Adventures of Pedro Penduko^{1}^{5}^{19}^{35} and Magkaribal^{1}^{35} on Jeepney TV
- February 8: Show Window: The Queen's House on Heart of Asia^{2}
- February 9: The Seed of Love on GTV^{2}
- February 9: Parallel World on Heart of Asia^{2}
- February 9: Crazy for You on Jeepney TV^{1}
- February 9: The Forbidden Flower on Kapamilya Channel
- February 9: Paano ang Pangako? on Kapatid Channel^{3}^{31}
- February 16: Makiling on GTV^{2}
- February 16: Princess Hours on Heart of Asia^{1}^{2}^{8}^{15}^{26}
- February 16: Kambal sa Uma on Jeepney TV^{1}
- February 21: The Red Sleeve on Heart of Asia^{2}
- February 22: !Oka Tokat (1997) on Jeepney TV^{1}
- February 23: AraBella on GTV^{2}
- February 23: My Dear Donovan^{2} and The Leaves on Heart of Asia
- March 1: The Little Prince and Friends on GTV^{2}
- March 2: Red Balloon^{2}, The Betrayal^{2} and Yo-kai Watch^{2}^{26} on Heart of Asia
- March 2: Komiks Presents: Kapitan Boom on Kapamilya Channel^{1}^{5}
- March 7: Dino Dan and Her Bucket List on Heart of Asia^{2}
- March 9: Margarita on Jeepney TV^{1}
- March 14: Oh My Boss on Heart of Asia^{2}
- March 16: When the Sky Falls on Heart of Asia^{2}
- March 16: Dyosa, Momay, Pangarap na Bituin and Precious Hearts Romances Presents: Somewhere in My Heart on Jeepney TV^{1}
- March 22: Love at First Night and Third Rail on Heart of Asia^{2}
- March 23: Oh My G! on Jeepney TV^{1}
- March 23: Can't Buy Me Love and Komiks Presents: Tiny Tony^{1}^{5} on Kapamilya Channel
- March 29: Spy × Family on GTV^{2}
- April 5: Ancient Love Poetry on Heart of Asia^{2}
- April 6: Desirable Flowers^{2}, Nabi, My Stepdarling^{26} and Put Your Head on My Shoulder^{2} on Heart of Asia
- April 6: Precious Hearts Romances Presents: Hiyas on Jeepney TV^{1}
- April 11: Dr. Stone on Heart of Asia^{2}
- April 13: Darating ang Umaga^{1}, FlordeLiza^{1}, Lobo^{1}^{4} and Precious Hearts Romances Presents: Impostor^{1} on Jeepney TV
- April 19: Queen of the Ring on Heart of Asia^{2}
- April 19: Berks on Jeepney TV^{1}
- April 20: Lastikman on Cine Mo!^{1}^{8}^{19}^{35}
- April 20: Bleach (seasons 2 and 3)^{2}^{26} and The Love Trap^{26} on Heart of Asia
- April 20: Precious Hearts Romances Presents: Midnight Phantom on Jeepney TV^{1}
- April 20: Lumuhod Ka sa Lupa on Kapatid Channel^{3}^{9}
- April 27: Agency, All New Jackie Chan Adventures, Bai Ling Tan and Now, We Are Breaking Up on Heart of Asia^{2}
- April 27: Huwag Kang Mangamba on Jeepney TV^{3}^{19}^{25}
- May 3: The Girl Who Sees Smells on Heart of Asia^{2}
- May 4: Love Between Fairy and Moon Supreme on Heart of Asia^{2}
- May 4: Iisa Pa Lamang, Nagsimula sa Puso and Prinsesa ng Banyera on Jeepney TV^{1}
- May 4: High Street on Kapamilya Channel
- May 4: Mga Kwentong Epik on Kapatid Channel^{3}^{9}
- May 10: Tubig at Langis on Jeepney TV^{1}^{35}
- May 11: When I Marry a Stranger on Heart of Asia^{2}
- May 11: 100 Days to Heaven on Jeepney TV^{1}^{19}
- May 18: You Are My Makeup Artist on Heart of Asia^{2}
- May 18: Hanggang Saan and Precious Hearts Romances Presents: Love Me Again on Jeepney TV^{1}
- May 23: Miracle of Love and The Millionaire's Wife on Heart of Asia^{2}
- May 25: Love You Stranger on GTV^{2}
- May 25: Jinxed at First on Heart of Asia^{2}
- May 30: Agua Bendita^{1}^{35} and Labs Ko si Babe^{1} on Jeepney TV
- June 1: Because of You and False Positive on GTV^{2}
- June 1: The Long Ballad on Heart of Asia^{2}
- June 6: Master's Daughter on GTV
- June 6: The Legend of Shen Li on Heart of Asia^{2}
- June 6: Kung Fu Kids on Jeepney TV^{1}^{5}^{35}
- June 8: My Name is Busaba and The Last Promise on Heart of Asia^{2}
- June 15: Secret Affair and The Cheery Lee, Village Headman on Heart of Asia^{2}
- June 15: Tanging Yaman on Jeepney TV^{1}
- June 21: Love Revolution on Heart of Asia^{2}
- June 22: Mga Anghel na Walang Langit^{1}^{35} and The Good Son^{1}^{19}^{25} on Jeepney TV
- June 27: The Maid on Heart of Asia^{2}
- June 28: Delightfully Deceitful on Heart of Asia^{2}
- June 29: Galema: Anak ni Zuma on Cine Mo!^{1}^{8}^{35}
- June 29: First Yaya and Grazilda on GTV^{2}^{33}
- June 29: One Piece (season 17) on Heart of Asia^{2}
- June 29: Born for You and We Will Survive on Jeepney TV^{1}
- July 4: Aliens Ninano on Heart of Asia^{2}^{26}
- July 6: Kokdu: Season of Deity on Heart of Asia^{2}
- July 6: Huwag Ka Lang Mawawala on Jeepney TV^{1}
- July 13: Endless Love (2019) on Heart of Asia^{2}
- July 13: Precious Hearts Romances Presents: My Cheating Heart on Jeepney TV^{1}
- July 18: Familia Zaragoza on Jeepney TV^{1}
- July 19: Cardcaptor Sakura: Clear Card on GTV^{2}^{5}^{25}
- July 19: Tricky Love on Heart of Asia^{2}
- July 20: Lilet Matias: Attorney-at-Law on GTV^{2}
- July 20: Rewriting Destiny and Snow Eagle Lord on Heart of Asia^{2}
- July 20: Endless Love (2015) on SolarFlix
- July 27: Astrophile on Heart of Asia^{2}
- July 27: Magandang Buhay on Jeepney TV
- July 28: Happiness on Kapamilya Channel
- August 1: Kiss Goblin^{2}, Spy × Family^{2}^{26} and Stealer: The Treasure Keeper^{2} on Heart of Asia
- August 3: Beauty and the Guy and Wicked-in-Law on Heart of Asia^{2}
- August 3: Nang Ngumiti ang Langit^{1}^{19}^{25}^{35} and Sana Bukas Pa ang Kahapon^{1} on Jeepney TV
- August 9: It Might Be You on Jeepney TV^{1}
- August 10: My Love in the Countryside and Queen of Masks on Heart of Asia^{2}
- August 15: The Heavenly Idol on Heart of Asia^{2}
- August 16: Bakugan 3.1 on GTV^{2}
- August 17: 46 Days on Heart of Asia^{2}
- August 17: Be My Lady on Jeepney TV^{1}^{19}^{25}
- August 22: Mint To Be on Heart of Asia^{2}
- August 23: Bai Ling Tan^{2} and Me Always You^{26} on Heart of Asia
- August 24: Flames of Vengeance on Heart of Asia^{2}^{26}
- August 24: Aryana, Bukas na Lang Kita Mamahalin, Dream Dad and Gulong ng Palad (2006) on Jeepney TV^{1}
- August 30: Aliens Ninano^{2} and Good Old Days on GTV
- August 31: Exclusive Fairytale on Heart of Asia^{2}
- August 31: Face to Face with Ate Koring and No Harm, No Foul on RPTV^{3}
- September 1: Tayong Dalawa on Cine Mo!^{1}^{8}
- September 5: Demolition Job on RPTV^{3}
- September 6: Pidol's Wonderland^{3}^{37} and The Men's Room^{3}^{36} on RPTV
- September 7: Douluo Continent^{2} and Knockout^{2}^{26} on Heart of Asia
- September 7: Kahit Konting Pagtingin and Precious Hearts Romances Presents: Los Bastardos on Jeepney TV^{1}
- September 13: H2O: Mermaid Adventures on GTV^{2}
- September 14: Bagito on Jeepney TV^{1}^{35}
- September 19: One Ordinary Day on GTV^{2}
- September 19: Perfect Marriage Revenge on Heart of Asia^{2}
- September 21: 23:23, Doctor Detective and The Lovely Runner on Heart of Asia^{2}
- September 21: Imortal on Jeepney TV^{1}
- September 26: Nabi, My Stepdarling on Heart of Asia^{26}
- September 26: Lastikman^{1}^{4}^{19}^{35} and Sa Piling Mo^{1} on Jeepney TV
- September 28: The Red Sleeve on Heart of Asia^{2}
- September 28: Magkano ang Iyong Dangal?^{1} and The Better Half^{1}^{34} on Jeepney TV
- October 4: Karelasyon on GTV^{2}
- October 4: Behind Your Smile on Heart of Asia^{26}
- October 5: Red Balloon, She and Her Perfect Husband^{2} and The Leaves on Heart of Asia
- October 5: What Lies Beneath on Kapamilya Channel
- October 10: Nathaniel on Jeepney TV^{1}
- October 10: Matteo G. Primetime on Kapamilya Channel^{40}
- October 12: Matteo G. Primetime on ANC^{40}
- October 12: Duty After School on Heart of Asia^{2}
- October 19: Jinxed at First on Heart of Asia^{2}
- October 25: Superhero Academy on GTV^{2}
- October 26: Eclipse of the Heart on GTV^{2}^{33}
- October 26: Mirabella on Jeepney TV^{1}
- October 31: Boy For Rent on Heart of Asia^{2}
- November 1: Bridges of Love on Jeepney TV^{1}
- November 2: Curtain Call on Heart of Asia^{2}
- November 9: Exclusive Fairytale, Love Between Fairy and Moon Supreme, To the Moon and Back and When the Sky Falls on Heart of Asia^{2}
- November 9: Since I Found You on Jeepney TV
- November 14: Midnight Museum on GTV^{2}
- November 16: You Touched My Heart on Heart of Asia^{2}
- November 16: May Isang Pangarap, Sineserye Presents: May Minamahal and Starla on Jeepney TV^{1}
- November 23: Vietnam Rose on Jeepney TV^{1}

===== Upcoming =====
- November 30: You Are My Makeup Artist on Heart of Asia^{2}

Notes

1. ^ ^{a} Originally aired on ABS-CBN (now Kapamilya Channel)
2. ^ ^{b} Originally aired on GMA
3. ^ ^{c} Originally aired on TV5
4. ^ ^{d} Originally aired on Cine Mo!
5. ^ ^{e} Originally aired on Yey!
6. ^ ^{f} Originally aired on S+A (now Aliw 23)
7. ^ ^{g} Originally aired on GMA News TV (now GTV)
8. ^ ^{h} Originally aired on Jeepney TV
9. ^ ^{i} Originally aired on Sari-Sari Channel
10. ^ ^{j} Originally aired on Hero
11. ^ ^{k} Originally aired on ETC (now Solar Flix)
12. ^ ^{l} Originally aired on Jack TV
13. ^ ^{m} Originally aired on 2nd Avenue
14. ^ ^{n} Originally aired on CT
15. ^ ^{o} Originally aired on Studio 23 (now Aliw 23)
16. ^ ^{p} Originally aired on Q (now GTV)
17. ^ ^{q} Originally aired on RPN (now RPTV)
18. ^ ^{r} Originally aired on Fox Filipino
19. ^ ^{s} Originally aired on Kapamilya Channel
20. ^ ^{t} Originally aired on Metro Channel
21. ^ ^{u} Originally aired on Asianovela Channel
22. ^ ^{v} Originally aired on PTV
23. ^ ^{w} Originally aired on Knowledge Channel
24. ^ ^{x} Originally aired on CNN Philippines (now RPTV)
25. ^ ^{y} Originally aired on A2Z
26. ^ ^{z} Originally aired on GTV
27. ^ ^{aa} Originally aired on IBC
28. ^ ^{ab} Originally aired on ABC (now TV5)
29. ^ ^{ac} Originally aired on TeleAsia Filipino
30. ^ ^{ad} Originally aired on One Screen
31. ^ ^{ae} Originally aired on Colours
32. ^ ^{af} Originally aired on Solar Flix
33. ^ ^{ag} Originally aired on Heart of Asia Channel
34. ^ ^{ah} Originally aired on PIE Channel
35. ^ ^{ai} Originally aired on All TV
36. ^ ^{aj} Originally aired on One News
37. ^ ^{ak} Originally aired on BuKo Channel
38. ^ ^{al} Originally aired on One PH
39. ^ ^{am} Originally aired on Aliw 23
40. ^ ^{an} Originally aired on Bilyonaryo News Channel

=== Video streaming services ===
The following are programs that debuted on video streaming services:

- January 5: All TV News: Mabilis Lang 'To Shorts on Facebook (All TV News)
- January 20: Possessed (season 2) on YouTube (ABS-CBN News)
- January 28: Rated R: The Rico Hizon Podcast on YouTube (ABS-CBN News)
- January 29: Philippine Hometown Stories on YouTube (ABS-CBN News)
- February 6: Hell University on Viva One
- February 19: The Next Big Band on YouTube (ABS-CBN Entertainment)
- February 21: Project Loki on Cignal Play and Viva One
- February 23: The Secrets of Hotel 88 on iWant
- March 9: The Alibi: Ang Buong Katotohanan on iWant
- March 10: Philippines' Most Shocking Stories (season 3) on YouTube (ABS-CBN News)
- March 11: Oh My Gan! on YouTube (ABS-CBN News)
- March 20: The Silent Noise on Amazon Prime Video
- March 28: Kay Susan Tayo! Vlogs on YouTube (GMA Public Affairs)
- April 3: Blood vs Duty on Netflix
- April 4: Blood vs Duty on iWant
- April 9: Hot Takes on Facebook and YouTube (ABS-CBN Entertainment)
- April 11: S.O.C.O.: Scene of the Crime Operatives (2nd incarnation; season 2) on iWant
- April 11: Matteo G. Primetime on YouTube (Matteo Guidicelli)
- April 11: My Husband is a Mafia Boss on Viva One
- April 18: Patrol on the GO on YouTube (ABS-CBN News)
- April 24: A Secret in Prague on Netflix
- May 8: Love Is Never Gone on Amazon Prime Video
- May 8: The Master Cutter (seasons 1 and 2) on Netflix
- May 9: NBA Tambay Time on Amazon Prime Video
- May 21: BINIverse and Chorus on iWant and YouTube (iWant)
- May 24: Kumusta on Viu
- May 29: Viva's Next Big Star on Viva One
- June 3: Miss Behave on iWant
- June 9: Kuan on One (season 5) on iWant and YouTube (ABS-CBN Entertainment)
- June 9: Philippines' Strangest Mysteries on YouTube (ABS-CBN News)
- June 12: Nurse the Dead on iWant
- June 12: Dating Alys Perez on Viva One
- June 26: Love, Siargao on Viu
- July 3: The Loyalty Game on Amazon Prime Video
- July 23: Come Dine with Me: Celebrity Philippines on HBO Max
- July 24: Someone, Someday on Netflix
- July 24: Love U Lots on Viva One
- July 25: Ikuwento Mo Kay Dr. Love on Facebook (Bro Jun Banaag)
- July 25: Someone, Someday on iWant
- July 28: Philippines' Oddest Jobs on YouTube (ABS-CBN News)
- July 29: Hello Outside World on YouTube (ABS-CBN Entertainment)
- July 30: Drug War: A Conspiracy of Silence on YouTube (Rein Entertainment)
- August 12: Philippine Controversies Revisited on YouTube (GMA Public Affairs)
- August 13: Call My Manager on HBO Max
- August 25: Philippines' Most Shocking Stories (season 4) on YouTube (ABS-CBN News)
- August 27: The Angeline Quinto Show on iWant
- September 11: Honor Thy Mother on Amazon Prime Video
- September 13: GGV Unfiltered on iWant
- September 16: Crayon Shin-chan and Sparks Camp (season 4) on iWant
- September 18: From Vlog to Love on YouTube (GMA Network)
- September 19: Our Yesterday's Escape on Viva One
- September 25: Drag Race Philippines (season 4) on WOW Presents Plus
- October 8: NBA on D+: The Plus Side on YouTube (Disney+ Philippines)
- October 15: Philippines' Most Haunted on YouTube (ABS-CBN News)
- October 16: Mommy Guard on Netflix
- October 17: Delivery Boi on GMA Play
- October 29: Balaraw on Netflix
- October 30: LOL: Last One Laughing Philippines (season 2) on Amazon Prime Video
- November 7: Check-Up Podcast on YouTube (UNTV News and Rescue)
- November 20: Fight for My Way (Philippine adaptation) on Viva One
- November 23: iWant PBB Extra on iWant
- November 23: The Way Back to You on Viu

== Returning or renamed programs ==
=== Major networks ===
Show	Last aired	Retitled as/Season/Notes	Channel	Return date
Primetime Sine Festival	2021	Cine Cinco Primetime	TV5	January 2
S.O.C.O.: Scene of the Crime Operatives	2020 (ABS-CBN / DZMM TeleRadyo)	Same (2nd incarnation; season 1)	A2Z / All TV / Kapamilya Channel	January 17
America's Got Talent	2014 (TGC)	Same (season 20)	TV5	January 31
From Helen's Kitchen	2023	Same (season 5)	TV5 / RPTV	February 7
Stars on the Floor	2025	Same (season 2)	GMA	February 15
Chibi Maruko-chan	2018 (GMA / GMA News TV; as a live-action drama) / 2021 (Heart of Asia)	Same (animated adaptation)	TV5	February 16
The Boobay and Tekla Show	2026	TBATS On the Go	GMA	March 1
TikTalks	2024	Same (season 3)	TV5	March 1
Heart World	2025	Same (season 2)	GMA	March 7
Face to Face: Harapan	2026	Face to Face with Ate Koring	All TV / Kapamilya Channel / TV5	March 16
GMA Integrated News Bulletin	2026	GMA News Bulletin	GMA / GTV	April 2
S.O.C.O.: Scene of the Crime Operatives	2026 (2nd incarnation; season 1)	Same (2nd incarnation; season 2)	A2Z / All TV / Kapamilya Channel	April 18
Kapamilya, Deal or No Deal	2016 (ABS-CBN)	Same (season 6)	A2Z / All TV / Kapamilya Channel / TV5	April 25
Klinika 630	2025 (TeleRadyo Serbisyo / PRTV Prime Media)	Sagot ni Doc	AllRadio TV / All TV	April 25
Everybody, Sing!	2024	Same (season 4)	A2Z / All TV / Kapamilya Channel / TV5	May 2
Y Speak	2010 (Studio 23)	Y Speak 2.0	All TV / Kapamilya Channel	May 9
Jujutsu Kaisen	2024	Same (season 2)	GMA	May 16
Sunday Blockbusters (1st incarnation)	2026	Sunday Noontime Blockbusters	A2Z / All TV / Kapamilya Channel	May 17
Kapamilya Blockbusters	2026	Blockbusters sa Umaga	A2Z / All TV / Kapamilya Channel / TV5	June 29
KB Family Weekend	2026	Blockbusters sa Umaga	A2Z / All TV / Kapamilya Channel / TV5	June 29
Zinema Sa Umaga	2026	Blockbusters sa Umaga	A2Z / All TV / Kapamilya Channel / TV5	June 29
Ratsada	2015	Ratsada Balita	GMA Iloilo	June 29
Vibe	2026	Vibe+	TV5 / Kapatid Channel / One PH / True TV	July 11
Kuan on One	2026	Same (season 5)	A2Z / All TV / Kapamilya Channel	August 2
Frontline sa Umaga	2024	Same (2nd incarnation)	TV5 / Kapatid Channel / RPTV	August 10
Kamen Rider	2025	Same (season 33: "Geats")	GMA	August 17
Gandang Gabi, Vice!	2020 (ABS-CBN)	Same (season 9)	GMA	September 13
The Voice Kids	2025	Same (season 8)	GMA	September 13
Crayon Shin-chan	2003 (IBC)	Same	A2Z / All TV / Kapamilya Channel	September 26
Face to Face with Ate Koring	2026	Gandang Mornings with Ate Koring	All TV / Kapamilya Channel / TV5	October 12
Pinoy Big Brother	2024 (A2Z / Kapamilya Channel / TV5)	Same (season 12: "Collab 3.0")	GMA	October 24
Sunday Noontime Blockbusters	2026	Sunday Blockbusters (2nd incarnation)	A2Z / All TV / Kapamilya Channel	October 25
American Idol	2026	Same (season 24)	TV5	November 14
iWant Originals	2024	Same (weeknight edition)	A2Z / All TV / Kapamilya Channel / TV5	November 30

=== State-owned networks ===
Show	Last aired	Retitled as/Season/Notes	Channel	Return date
Ala-Una sa Balita	2026	Treze sa Tanghali	Congress TV / DWAN TV / IBC	February 2
Chairman’s Report with Dante "Klink" Ang	2025	Same (season 4)	IBC	February 13
Cooltura	2025	Same (season 3)	IBC	February 14
Express Balita	2026 (2nd incarnation)	Treze Express	IBC	February 16
Tutok 13	2026	Tutok Treze	DWAN TV / IBC	April 13
Dok True Ba?	2025	Same (season 4)	DWAN TV / IBC	April 19
ResTOURant	2026	Same (season 5)	IBC	May 8
Kalye Sining	2025	Same (season 2)	IBC	July 24
Masters of the Game	2023 (PTV)	Same (2nd incarnation)	DWAN TV / IBC	September 5
Legally Speaking	2026	Same (season 3)	IBC	September 6
Chairman’s Report with Dante "Klink" Ang	2026	Same (season 5)	IBC	September 11
Naked Minds	2026	Same (season 2)	IBC	October 30
Gov on the Move	2026	Same (season 2)	IBC	November 7
ResTOURant	2026	Same (season 6)	IBC	November 13
Good Stories	2026	Same (season 2)	IBC	November 21

=== Minor networks ===
Show	Last aired	Retitled as/Season/Notes	Channel	Return date
Word Hub	2017	Word Hub: Wonders of Word City	Net 25	March 28
Chismax: Chismis to the Max	2020 (DZMM TeleRadyo)	Chizmax to the Max	Aliw 23 / DWIZ News TV	May 18
Todo Arangkada Balita	2017 (8triTV)	DWIZ Todo Balita	Aliw 23 / DWIZ News TV	May 23
Doctors on TV	2026	Check-Up Podcast	UNTV	November 8

=== Other channels ===
Show	Last aired	Retitled as/Season/Notes	Channel	Return date
NCAA Women's Volleyball	2025	Same (season 101)	GTV / Heart of Asia	January 23
Wil To Win	2025 (TV5 / BuKo Channel / One PH / RPTV / Sari-Sari Channel)	Wilyonaryo	WilTV	January 25
Premier Volleyball League	2025	Same (season 8: "All-Filipino Conference"; season 21 as Shakey's V-League)	One Sports / One Sports+	January 31
Perfect Morning	2023	Perfect Mornings	One PH	February 2
UAAP Men's & Women's Volleyball	2025	Same (season 88)	One Sports / UAAP Varsity Channel	February 14
Spikers' Turf	2025	Same (season 9: "Open Conference")	One Sports / One Sports+	February 25
Ronda Pasada	2026	Pasada Balita	DZMM TeleRadyo	March 2
S.O.C.O. sa DZMM	2020	Same (2nd incarnation)	DZMM TeleRadyo / PRTV Prime Media	March 7
D8TV News: Balitang Balita	2025	D8 Patrol	D8TV	March 9
Philippine Basketball Association	2026 (season 50: "Philippine Cup")	Same (season 50: "Commissioner's Cup")	PBA Rush / RPTV	March 11
Mutya ng Masa	2015 (ABS-CBN)	Same (2nd incarnation)	DZMM TeleRadyo / PRTV Prime Media	March 14
Wais Konsyumer	2025 (TeleRadyo Serbisyo)	Same (2nd incarnation)	DZMM TeleRadyo / PRTV Prime Media	March 21
Willingly Yours	2003 (ABS-CBN)	Same (2nd incarnation)	WilTV	March 23
Maharlika Pilipinas Basketball League	2025	Same (season 8)	Solar Sports / TAP Sports	April 10
Dapat Alam Mo!	2023 (GMA) / 2024 (GTV / Pinoy Hits)	Alam Mo Dapat!	D8TV	April 10
The B Side	2025	Same (season 3)	Cinema One	April 10
ANC Headlines	2024	Same (2nd incarnation)	ANC	May 1
Juan EU Konek	2016	Juan Conversations	ANC	May 30
Señor Balita	2026 (Aliw 23 / DWIZ News TV)	Same	DWAN TV	June 2
Business Matters	2025	Same (season 13)	GTV	June 14
Inay Ko Po!	2026	Inays, Level Up!	One PH / True TV	July 4
Premier Volleyball League	2026 (season 8: "All-Filipino Conference")	Same (season 9: "on Tour and Invitational Conference"; season 22 as Shakey's V-League)	One Sports / One Sports+	July 8
Philippine Basketball Association	2026 (season 50: "Commissioner's Cup")	Same (season 50: "Governors' Cup")	PBA Rush / RPTV	July 10
Bilyonaryo Quiz B	2025	Same (season 2)	Bilyonaryo News Channel	July 11
Fastbreak	2020	Tara, Game!	DZMM TeleRadyo / PRTV Prime Media	August 15
University Athletic Association of the Philippines	2026	Same (season 89)	One Sports / UAAP Varsity Channel	September 12
National Collegiate Athletic Association	2026 (GTV / Heart of Asia)	Same (season 102)	NCAA NXT / RPTV	September 13
Usap-Usapan	2025 (Radyo Pilipinas 1 Television)	Usap-usapan: What We Know So Far	GTV	September 14
Siyensikat	2025	Same (season 7)	GTV	September 19
TeleTabloid (2nd incarnation)	2026	Abante Pilipinas (3rd incarnation)	Abante News TV	October 5
Premier Volleyball League	2026 (season 9: "on Tour and Invitational Conference"; season 22 as Shakey's V-League)	Same (season 9: "All-Filipino Conference"; season 22 as Shakey's V-League)	One Sports / One Sports+	October 10
Spikers' Turf	2026 (season 9: "Open Conference")	Same (season 10: "Invitational Conference")	One Sports / One Sports+	October 10
Shop TV	2026	E-Novation TV	SolarFlix / Solar Sports	October 10
National Basketball Association	2026	Same (2026–27 season)	NBA TV Philippines / One Sports	October 21
PRTV News Break	2026	Pilipinas News Update	PRTV Prime Media	November 9

=== Video streaming services ===
Show	Last aired	Retitled as/Season/Notes	Service	Return date
All TV News: Top of the Hour	2026	All TV News: Mabilis Lang 'To Shorts	Facebook (All TV)	January 5
Possessed	2025	Same (season 2)	YouTube (ABS-CBN News)	January 20
Philippines' Most Shocking Stories	2026	Same (season 3)	YouTube (ABS-CBN News)	March 10
Kay Susan Tayo! sa Super Radyo DZBB	2020 (GMA News TV)	Kay Susan Tayo! Vlogs	YouTube (GMA Public Affairs)	March 28
S.O.C.O.: Scene of the Crime Operatives	2026 (2nd incarnation; season 1)	Same (2nd incarnation; season 2)	iWant	April 11
Kuan on One	2026	Same (season 5)	iWant and YouTube (ABS-CBN Entertainment)	June 9
Seducing Drake Palma	2025	Dating Alys Perez	Viva One	June 12
Dr. Love Radio Show	2026 (True TV)	Ikuwento Mo Kay Dr. Love	Facebook (Bro Jun Banaag)	July 25
Philippines' Most Shocking Stories	2026 (season 3)	Same (season 4)	YouTube (ABS-CBN News)	August 25
Sparks Camp	2025 (YouTube; ABS-CBN Entertainment)	Same (season 4)	iWant	September 16
Drag Race Philippines	2024	Same (season 4)	WOW Presents Plus	September 25
Drag Race Philippines: Untucked!	2024	Same (season 4)	WOW Presents Plus	September 25
LOL: Last One Laughing Philippines	2024	Same (season 2)	Amazon Prime Video	October 30

== Programs transferring networks ==
=== Major networks ===
Date	Show	No. of seasons	Moved from	Moved to
January 2	FPJ's Batang Quiapo	7	TV5	All TV
January 2	Roja	1	TV5	All TV
January 2	What Lies Beneath	—N/a	TV5	All TV
January 3	Your Face Sounds Familiar	4	TV5	All TV
January 31	America's Got Talent	20	TGC	TV5
February 16	Chibi Maruko-chan	—N/a	GMA / GMA News TV (now GTV) / Heart of Asia (as a live-action drama)	TV5 (as an animated adaptation)
June 29	Face to Face: Harapan	—N/a	One PH	All TV / Kapamilya Channel (as Face to Face with Ate Koring)
July 27	A Secret in Prague	1	One PH	A2Z / All TV / Kapamilya Channel
July 27	My Bespren Emman	2	One PH	A2Z / All TV / Kapamilya Channel
September 13	Gandang Gabi Vice	9	ABS-CBN (now Kapamilya Channel)	GMA
September 26	Crayon Shin-chan	—N/a	IBC	A2Z / All TV / Kapamilya Channel
October 24	Pinoy Big Brother	12	A2Z / Kapamilya Channel / TV5	GMA

=== State-owned networks ===
Date	Show	No. of seasons	Moved from	Moved to
September 5	Masters of the Game	—N/a	PTV	DWAN TV / IBC

=== Minor networks ===
Date	Show	No. of seasons	Moved from	Moved to
May 18	Chismax: Chismis to the Max	—N/a	DZMM TeleRadyo	Aliw 23 / DWIZ News TV (as Chizmax to the Max)
May 23	Todo Arangkada Balita	—N/a	8triTV (now Radyo Bandido TV)	Aliw 23 / DWIZ News TV (as DWIZ Todo Balita)

=== Other channels ===
Date	Show	No. of seasons	Moved from	Moved to
March 23	Willingly Yours	—N/a	ABS-CBN (now Kapamilya Channel)	WilTV
April 10	Dapat Alam Mo!	—N/a	GMA / GTV / Pinoy Hits	D8TV (as Alam Mo Dapat!)
June 2	Señor Balita	—N/a	Aliw 23 / DWIZ News TV	DWAN TV
August 16	Buhay at Kalusugan	—N/a	Veritas TV Radyo	DZMM TeleRadyo / PRTV Prime Media
September 13	National Collegiate Athletic Association	102	GTV / Heart of Asia	NCAA Next / RPTV
September 14	Usap-Usapan	—N/a	Radyo Pilipinas 1 Television	GTV (as Usap-usapan: What We Know So Far)

=== Video streaming services ===
Date	Show	No. of seasons	Moved from	Moved to
July 25	Dr. Love Radio Show	—N/a	True TV	Facebook (Bro Jun Banaag) (as Ikuwento Mo Kay Dr. Love)

== Milestone episodes ==
The following shows made their Milestone episodes in 2026;

Show	Network	Episode #	Episode title	Episode air date
Family Feud (4th incarnation)	GMA	900th	"Happy Eid'l Adha"	January 2
Daig Kayo ng Lola Ko	GMA / GTV	400th	"Charing's Charm"	January 3
Kapuso Mo, Jessica Soho	GMA / GTV	1,100th	"1,100th Episode"	January 4
Pinoy Big Brother: Celebrity Collab Edition 2.0	GMA	100th	"Bistro"	February 1
Totoy Bato (2025)	TV5 / Kapatid Channel / One PH / Sari-Sari Channel	200th	"Pruweba"	February 9
Hating Kapatid	GMA	100th	"DNA Proof"	February 16
Tadhana	GMA	400th	"Atty. Sekyu" (Part 2)	February 21
Fast Talk with Boy Abunda	GMA	800th	"Boobay and Tekla"	February 26
What Lies Beneath	A2Z / All TV / Jeepney TV / Kapamilya Channel	100th	"Edge of Justice"	March 6
Encantadia Chronicles: Sang'gre	GMA / GTV	200th	"Balik Devas"	March 20
It's Showtime	A2Z / All TV / GMA / Kapamilya Channel	4,600th	"Choose Tuesday"	March 24
Gud Morning Kapatid	TV5 / Kapatid Channel / RPTV	700th	"700th Episode"	March 26
ASAP (3rd incarnation)	A2Z / All TV / Jeepney TV / Kapamilya Channel / Metro Channel	9,800th	"Bright Side"	March 29
Family Feud (4th incarnation)	GMA	1,000th	"Cinema and TV Legends"	May 26
Born to Shine	GMA	100th	"Family Revelation"	July 20
Fast Talk with Boy Abunda	GMA	900th	"Jelai Andres"	July 20
It's Showtime	A2Z / All TV / GMA / Kapamilya Channel	4,700th	"Act Q and A"	July 20
iBilib	GMA	700th	"700th Episode"	August 9
Eat Bulaga!	TV5 / Kapatid Channel / RPTV	14,600th	"14,600th Episode"	August 21
My Bespren Emman	A2Z / All TV / Kapamilya Channel / TV5	100th	"Cianong, ang E.M.P."	September 4
A Secret in Prague	A2Z / All TV / Kapamilya Channel / TV5	100th	"Pinagpalang Kasalan"	September 11
Kapatid Mo, Idol Raffy Tulfo	TV5 / Kapatid Channel	100th	"100th Episode"	September 13
The Master Cutter (seasons 1 and 2)	GMA / GTV / Heart of Asia / I Heart Movies	100th	"Defeat The Enemy"	September 25
Taskforce Firewall	GMA / GTV / Heart of Asia / I Heart Movies	100th	"Martin Frames Galo"	October 9
Kamao	GMA	100th	"Payback Time"	October 12
Family Feud (4th incarnation)	GMA	1,100th	"Hunks vs. Babes"	October 13
Sigabo	A2Z / All TV / Kapamilya Channel / TV5	100th	"Salisi"	November 6
Born to Shine	GMA	200th	"Winning Vanna Back"	November 13
Farm to Table	GMA	300th	"300th Episode"	November 14

== Finales ==
=== Major networks ===
==== A2Z ====
The following are programs that ended on A2Z:

- January 30: Kapamilya, Deal or No Deal (seasons 4 and 5)
- February 6: Go Ahead
- March 13: FPJ's Batang Quiapo and Roja
- March 21: Lavender Fields (rerun)
- April 1: What Lies Beneath
- April 10: The Forbidden Flower (rerun)
- April 19: Mega Blockbusters, Rainbow Rumble (season 2) and Your Face Sounds Familiar (season 4)
- May 1: Love Scout and Senior High (rerun)
- May 10: Sunday Blockbusters and TV Patrol Regional (2nd incarnation)
- May 17: Kuan on One (seasons 1–4)
- May 22: Queen Mantis
- June 19: Love Your Enemy
- June 28: Zinema Sa Umaga (A2Z Zinema)
- July 19: Tubig to Handle: What the Fun!
- July 24: Blood vs Duty and The Alibi: Ang Buong Katotohanan
- August 14: Fireworks of My Heart
- August 21: Happiness (rerun) and High Street (rerun)
- August 29: Bubu and the Little Owls and Dinoman
- September 19: Tulipop
- October 2: A Secret in Prague, Can't Buy Me Love (rerun) and My Bespren Emman
- October 4: Everybody, Sing! (season 4)
- October 18: Kuan on One (season 5), Philippines' Most Shocking Stories and Sunday Noontime Blockbusters
- October 31: Baby Einstein
- November 7: Miss Behave and Philippines' Oddest Jobs
- November 15: Philippines' Most Haunted
- November 20: Falling into Your Smile

===== Scheduled =====
- November 27: Someone, Someday

===== Stopped airing =====
Program	Last airing	Resumed airing	Reason
Tao Po!	July 18	September 5	Program was temporarily replaced by Ibang Level 'To!
Afternoon Zinema (A2Z Zinema)	July 24	August 24	Program was temporarily replaced by the reruns of Happiness and the remaining episodes of High Street.
Zine Aksyon (A2Z Zinema)	August 29	November 14	Program was temporarily replaced by Miss Behave.

==== All TV ====
The following are programs that ended on All TV:

- January 1: Ang sa Iyo ay Akin, Annaliza (2013), Apoy sa Dagat, Basta't Kasama Kita, Ikaw ay Pag-Ibig, Maging Sino Ka Man: Ang Pagbabalik, Maria Flordeluna, Precious Hearts Romances Presents: Paraiso, Pusong Ligaw, The Blood Sisters and Walang Hanggan (2012)
- January 16: 100 Days to Heaven
- January 30: Kapamilya, Deal or No Deal (season 4)
- February 6: Go Ahead
- February 16: Movie Central Presents
- March 13: FPJ's Batang Quiapo and Roja
- March 21: Lavender Fields
- April 1: What Lies Beneath
- April 10: The Forbidden Flower
- April 17: Komiks Presents
- April 19: Mega Blockbusters, Rainbow Rumble (season 2) and Your Face Sounds Familiar (season 4)
- May 1: Love Scout and Senior High
- May 10: Sunday Blockbusters and TV Patrol Regional (2nd incarnation)
- May 17: Kuan on One (seasons 3 and 4)
- May 22: Queen Mantis
- May 23: Y Speak 2.0
- June 19: Love Your Enemy
- June 26: Kapamilya Blockbusters and Magandang Buhay
- June 28: KB Family Weekend
- July 3: Oh My Gan!
- July 19: Tubig to Handle: What the Fun!
- July 24: Blood vs Duty and The Alibi: Ang Buong Katotohanan
- August 14: Fireworks of My Heart
- August 21: Happiness and High Street
- August 29: Bubu and the Little Owls and Dinoman
- September 19: Tulipop
- October 2: A Secret in Prague, Can't Buy Me Love (rerun) and My Bespren Emman
- October 4: Everybody, Sing! (season 4)
- October 9: Face to Face with Ate Koring
- October 18: Kuan on One (season 5), Philippines' Most Shocking Stories and Sunday Noontime Blockbusters
- October 31: Baby Einstein
- November 7: Miss Behave and Philippines' Oddest Jobs
- November 15: Philippines' Most Haunted
- November 20: Falling into Your Smile

===== Scheduled =====
- November 27: Someone, Someday

===== Stopped airing =====
Program	Last airing	Resumed airing	Reason
All TV News: Mabilis Lang 'To	January 1	July 6	Programming changes.
Super Kapamilya Blockbusters	May 2	May 30	Program was temporarily replaced by Y Speak 2.0.
Tao Po!	July 18	September 5	Program was temporarily replaced by Ibang Level 'To!
Kapamilya Gold Hits	July 24	August 24	Program was temporarily replaced by the reruns of Happiness and the remaining episodes of High Street.
Kapamilya Action Sabado	August 29	November 14	Program was temporarily replaced by Miss Behave.

==== GMA ====
The following are programs that ended on GMA Network:

- January 2: You Are My Makeup Artist
- January 9: Love Between Fairy and Moon Supreme
- January 11: Cayetano in Action with Boy Abunda
- January 17: Cruz vs Cruz
- January 30: Sanggang-Dikit FR and The Baker King (2010; rerun)
- January 31: To the Moon and Back (rerun)
- February 1: A.D. The Bible Continues (rerun)
- February 7: Sparkle U: #Frenemies (rerun)
- February 8: The Boobay and Tekla Show
- February 27: Unica Hija (rerun)
- February 28: Magic Kaito 1412 and Pinoy Big Brother: Celebrity Collab Edition 2.0
- March 13: Delightfully Deceitful
- March 20: Kamen Rider Saber (rerun)
- March 21: Hating Kapatid
- March 27: Astrophile and Tricky Love
- March 28: All New Jackie Chan Adventures
- March 29: The Bible (rerun)
- March 30: GMA Integrated News Bulletin
- April 12: Doors
- April 19: The Cheery Lee, Village Headman (rerun)
- April 25: Amazing Earth and Pinas Sarap
- May 8: Encantadia Chronicles: Sang'gre
- May 9: Voltes V (2017 dub reboot; rerun)
- May 22: House of Lies, Never Say Die and The Sweetest Taboo
- May 24: Knockout (rerun)
- May 31: Stars on the Floor (season 2)
- June 10: Mako Mermaids (rerun)
- June 12: 23:23 and My Love in the Countryside
- June 13: One Piece (season 17)
- June 14: H2O: Mermaid Adventures
- June 19: Apoy sa Dugo
- June 20: Heart World (season 2) and Hidden Love (Chinese adaptation; rerun)
- June 21: Midnight Museum
- June 26: One Western Visayas (GMA Iloilo), The Secrets of Hotel 88 and Wolfblood (rerun)
- July 19: Bakugan 3.1
- July 25: Planet XP
- July 31: You're My Favorite Song
- August 7: Exclusive Fairytale
- August 8: Detective Conan (season 7) (rerun)
- August 14: Duty After School and Lovers of the Red Sky
- August 16: The New Legends of Monkey (rerun)
- August 29: The Lovely Runner (rerun)
- September 4: You Touched My Heart
- September 5: Wish Ko Lang!
- September 6: TBATS On the Go and The Clash Teens
- September 25: Branding in Seongsu and First Yaya (rerun)
- October 16: Kamao
- October 17: The People Have Spoken
- October 23: Kamen Rider Geats and Love, Siargao
- November 13: Innocent Lies

===== Scheduled =====
- December 13: The Voice Kids (season 8)
- December 25: Maria Clara at Ibarra (rerun)

===== Stopped airing =====
Program	Last airing	Resumed airing	Reason
Daig Kayo ng Lola Ko (season 5)	February 28	August 15	Program was temporarily replaced by the second season of Heart World and Planet XP until July 25, and pre-empted by Rebuilding Broken Rooms on August 8.
Wagas (rerun)	February 28	August 15	Programming break.
Planet XP	May 30	June 27	Programming break.
I-Witness	August 1	August 15	Pre-empted by Rebuilding Broken Rooms.
FPJ sa GMA (2nd incarnation)	October 18	November 1	Pre-empted by From Vlog to Love.

==== TV5 ====
The following are programs that ended on TV5:

- January 1: FPJ's Batang Quiapo, Go Ahead, Roja and What Lies Beneath
- January 4: CCF Worship Service
- January 16: Cine Cinco Primetime
- January 24: American Idol (season 23)
- February 13: Kiddie Explorers
- February 21: Para sa Isa't Isa
- February 22: TikTalks (season 1; rerun)
- February 27: Word of God Network
- February 28: Gus Abelgas Forensics (seasons 3–5) and Vibe TV
- March 1: Little Princess Sarah
- March 6: Cine Cinco sa Hapon and Vibe Up
- March 8: Padyak Princess (rerun)
- March 13: Face to Face: Harapan
- April 5: Kagat ng Dilim (2020; rerun) and Sing Galing: Sing-lebrity Edition (season 2)
- April 18: Bad Genius: The Series (Philippine adaptation)
- April 24: The World of the Married and Totoy Bato (2025)
- April 25: Jack and Jill sa Diamond Hills (rerun)
- May 8: Sky Castle
- May 9: From Helen's Kitchen (season 5)
- May 15: Reborn Rich
- May 29: The Story of Park's Marriage Contract
- May 31: #ParangNormal Activity (rerun) and TikTalks (season 3)
- June 13: The Adventures of Tom Sawyer
- June 19: Kapatid Dokyu
- June 26: Cine Cinco sa Umaga and The Empire
- June 27: John en Ellen (rerun)
- June 28: Kumusta
- July 4: Vibe
- July 24: Nag-aapoy Na Damdamin (rerun)
- August 7: Gud Morning Kapatid
- August 9: The Singing Lodi
- August 14: Mano Po Legacy: The Family Fortune and Pira-Pirasong Paraiso (rerun)
- August 16: Prinsipe Cedie
- August 30: Cine Cinco Weekend Saya
- September 6: Ogie Diaz Inspires
- September 20: Project Loki
- October 2: A Secret in Prague and My Bespren Emman
- October 4: Everybody, Sing! (season 4) and Presinto 5 (2nd Incarnation)
- October 6: Cooking Master Boy
- October 9: Face to Face with Ate Koring
- October 16: Mano Po Legacy: Her Big Boss and Minute to Win It (season 1)
- October 17: America's Got Talent (season 20)
- October 30: Cassandra: Warrior Angel (rerun)
- November 6: Jasmine (rerun)
- November 7: America's Got Talent (season 20)

===== Scheduled =====
- November 27: Someone, Someday

===== Stopped airing =====
Program	Last airing	Resumed airing	Reason
Pinoy Explorer (rerun)	February 28	April 11	Programming break.
Pinoy Explorer (rerun)	May 16	September 6	Programming break.
Trolls: The Beat Goes On! (rerun)	April 25	November 7	Programming break.
Dragons: Race to the Edge (rerun)	April 26	October 31	Programming break.
Kapatid Sunday Specials	May 17	June 7	Programming break.
Midnight DJ (rerun)	May 17	August 17	Programming break.
Cine Cinco Hit na Hit	June 27	August 1	Programming break.
Chibi Maruko-chan	July 24	October 7	Programming break.

=== State-owned networks ===
==== PTV ====
The following are programs that ended on People's Television Network:

- February 14: Patubig sa Bagong Pilipinas and Philippine Bay Watch

===== Stopped airing =====
Program	Last airing	Resumed airing	Reason

==== IBC ====
The following are programs that ended on IBC:

- January 13: Rise and Shine Pilipinas
- January 30: Ala-Una sa Balita
- February 6: ResTOURant (season 4)
- February 8: Legally Speaking (season 2)
- February 13: Express Balita (2nd incarnation)
- April 10: Bangon Bagong Pilipinas and Tutok 13
- May 8: Chairman’s Report with Dante "Klink" Ang (season 4)
- May 16: Cooltura (season 3)
- June 13: Balitaktakan: Tinig ng Kinabukasan (season 1) and Good Stories (season 1)
- July 10: Naked Minds (season 1)
- July 26: Dok True Ba? (season 4)
- July 31: ResTOURant (season 5)
- October 3: Gov on the Move (season 1)

===== Stopped airing =====
Program	Last airing	Resumed airing	Reason
ResTOURant	February 6	May 8	Season break.

=== Minor networks ===
The following are programs that ended on minor networks:

- January 2: Love in Her Bag on Net 25
- January 29: The Awesome Life (rerun) on Light TV
- February 6: Happy Ending on Net 25
- March 6: Showbiz na Showbiz (2nd incarnation) on Aliw 23
- March 6: Love Me, Love My Voice (rerun) on Net 25
- March 22: Word Hub (rerun) on Net 25
- April 10: Here We Meet Again on Net 25
- May 4: Kapatiran Para sa Bayan on Aliw 23
- May 6: Pilipinas, Ngayon Na! on Aliw 23
- May 8: Balitambayan, Biyaheng IZ, Newscoop, Pasada Balita, Pinoy Gising!, Ronda Pilipinas, Señor Balita, Serbisyong Bayan ni Tatay Rannie, Sulong na Bayan, Up Up Pilipinas and Yes Yes Yo, Topacio on Aliw 23
- May 8: Hi Venus on Net 25
- May 9: Balitang Paliparan, IZ Balita Sabado, Laban Para sa Karapatan, Pulis @ Ur Serbis and Sa Kabukiran at Kabuhayan on Aliw 23
- May 10: Anong Say Ni Father, Anong Say Nina Brothers?, Eye Spotted, Fact or Fake, IZ Balita Linggo, Newscoop Weekend and Senior Moments on Aliw 23
- May 22: Meet Yourself on Net 25
- May 26: NegoShow on Aliw 23
- June 12: Me and My Music on Aliw 23
- June 25: Teaching the Bible on Light TV
- June 27: Himig at Balita on Aliw 23
- June 29: River of Worship on Light TV
- July 10: Tulay Pilipino on Aliw 23
- July 11: Walang Bolahan on Aliw 23
- July 17: You Are My Hero on Net 25
- August 13: NewsWatch Now (2nd incarnation) on Aliw 23
- August 23: City Sanctuary Worship Celebration on Light TV
- September 27: Beautiful Sunday, Chika Vlog and Jukebox Weekend on Aliw 23
- November 1: Doctors on TV on UNTV

==== Stopped airing ====
Program	Last airing	Resumed airing	Reason	Notes
Japan Video Topics	Light TV	February 20	March 2	Program was temporarily replaced by random program teasers and commercials.
KNC Show	UNTV	February 22	June 7	Program was temporarily replaced by Ang Dating Daan.
Brgy. 882	Aliw 23	March 14	July 4	Programming changes.
I Love Pinas (rerun)	Light TV	June 16	June 30	Pre-empted by the 8th anniversary hour-long celebration special episode of Prayer Line.
Ito Ang Balita Weekend Edition	UNTV	June 20	July 4	Program was temporarily replaced by Ang Dating Daan: Worldwide Bible Study.
Ito Ang Balita	UNTV	June 25	June 29	Program was temporarily replaced by Itanong mo kay Soriano.
Radyo IZtorya	Aliw 23	July 10	August 3	Programming changes.

=== Other channels ===
The following are programs that ended on other channels:

- January 2: Kokdu: Season of Deity (rerun) on Heart of Asia
- January 3: The Girl Who Sees Smells (rerun) on Heart of Asia
- January 4: From the Heart Specials: Ending Like a Flower (rerun) on Heart of Asia
- January 4: The Legend of Bruce Lee on Solar Sports
- January 9: 46 Days (rerun) and Hello from the Other Side (rerun) on Heart of Asia
- January 16: Bleach (season 3) on Heart of Asia
- January 16: 100 Days to Heaven on Kapamilya Channel
- January 17: Simba the King Lion (rerun) on Heart of Asia
- January 18: From the Heart Specials: The Best Ending (rerun) on Heart of Asia
- January 18: G-mik! (rerun) on Jeepney TV
- January 23: Bride of the Water God (rerun) on Heart of Asia
- January 23: Ikaw ay Pag-Ibig (rerun), Kahit Puso'y Masugatan (rerun) and Maria Flordeluna (rerun) on Jeepney TV
- January 25: Ysabella (rerun) on Jeepney TV
- January 30: Ala-Una sa Balita on Congress TV and DWAN TV
- January 30: PBBM Podcast on D8TV
- January 30: Sanggang-Dikit FR on GTV
- January 30: Dahil May Isang Ikaw (rerun) on Jeepney TV
- January 30: Kapamilya, Deal or No Deal (seasons 4 and 5) on Kapamilya Channel
- January 30: The Story of the Filipino (rerun) on RPTV
- January 31: Halik (rerun) and Super Inggo (rerun) on Jeepney TV
- February 1: I Need of Romance 3 (rerun) on Heart of Asia
- February 6: The Legend of Shen Li on Heart of Asia
- February 6: Rosalka on Jeepney TV
- February 6: Go Ahead on Kapamilya Channel
- February 6: Paano ang Pasko? on Kapatid Channel
- February 8: The Skywatcher on GTV
- February 13: Heartful Café and True Horror Stories (rerun) on GTV
- February 13: Curtain Call (rerun) on Heart of Asia
- February 13: Apoy sa Dagat (rerun) on Jeepney TV
- February 15: The Last Promise (rerun) on Heart of Asia
- February 15: Nasaan Ka Nang Kailangan Kita (rerun) on Jeepney TV
- February 20: One the Woman on GTV
- February 20: Bossam: Steal the Fate and Eclipse of the Heart (rerun) on Heart of Asia
- February 21: Para sa Isa't Isa on Sari-Sari Channel
- February 22: Aliens Ninano on GTV
- February 26: Dinofroz on Heart of Asia
- February 27: Kwento Nights and Ronda Pasada on DZMM TeleRadyo
- February 27: Master's Daughter on GTV
- February 27: Bad Romeo (rerun) and Wicked-in-Law on Heart of Asia
- February 28: Vibe TV on BuKo Channel, Kapatid Channel, Sari-Sari Channel and True TV
- February 28: Kwatro Alas on DZMM TeleRadyo
- February 28: Meteo Heroes on Heart of Asia
- March 1: Good Old Days on Heart of Asia
- March 6: Vibe Up on BuKo Channel and True TV
- March 6: Showbiz na Showbiz (2nd incarnation) on DWIZ News TV
- March 6: Moon of Desire (rerun) on Jeepney TV
- March 7: PinaSigla! on DZMM TeleRadyo and PRTV Prime Media
- March 7: Boy For Rent (rerun) on Heart of Asia
- March 13: She and Her Perfect Husband (rerun) on Heart of Asia
- March 13: Ang sa Iyo ay Akin (rerun), Crazy for You (rerun), Kahit Isang Saglit (rerun), Mutya (rerun) and Roja on Jeepney TV
- March 13: FPJ's Batang Quiapo and Roja on Kapamilya Channel
- March 13: Face to Face: Harapan on One PH
- March 14: FPJ's Batang Quiapo: Marathon on Cine Mo!
- March 14: Serbisyong DSWD for Every Juan on DZMM TeleRadyo and PRTV Prime Media
- March 15: Queen of Masks on Heart of Asia
- March 20: Annaliza (2013; rerun) on Jeepney TV
- March 20: Komiks Presents: Kapitan Boom on Kapamilya Channel
- March 21: Still on Heart of Asia
- March 21: Lavender Fields (rerun) on Kapamilya Channel
- March 26: O.F.W. (Overseas Filipino Watch) on DWAN TV
- March 28: Dr. Stone on GTV
- March 28: Tokyo Revengers (rerun) on Heart of Asia
- March 29: GMA Integrated News Bulletin on GTV
- March 29: The Red Sleeve (rerun) on Heart of Asia
- March 31: Play by Play on One News
- April 1: Behind Your Smile (rerun), My Dear Donovan (rerun) and The Betrayal (rerun) on Heart of Asia
- April 1: What Lies Beneath on Jeepney TV and Kapamilya Channel
- April 1: Play by Play on Kapatid Channel
- April 3: Margarita on Jeepney TV
- April 5: Sing Galing: Sing-lebrity Edition (season 2) on BuKo Channel and Sari-Sari Channel
- April 10: Bangon Bagong Pilipinas, DWAN 1206 News Alert and Tutok 13 on DWAN TV
- April 10: Langit Lupa (rerun), Maging Sino Ka Man: Ang Pagbabalik (rerun), Precious Hearts Romances Presents: Somewhere in My Heart (rerun) and Pusong Ligaw (rerun) on Jeepney TV
- April 10: The Forbidden Flower (rerun) on Kapamilya Channel
- April 12: Sa Puso Ko, Iingatan Ka (rerun) on Jeepney TV
- April 17: Lobo (rerun) on Cine Mo!
- April 17: Knockout and The Leaves (rerun) on Heart of Asia
- April 17: Precious Hearts Romances Presents: Paraiso (rerun) on Jeepney TV
- April 17: Komiks Presents on Kapamilya Channel
- April 17: Padyak Princess on Kapatid Channel
- April 18: Mobil 1: The Grid on ANC
- April 18: Her Bucket List (rerun) on Heart of Asia
- April 19: Mega Blockbusters, Rainbow Rumble (season 2) and Your Face Sounds Familiar (season 4) on Kapamilya Channel
- April 24: An Oriental Odyssey (rerun), Princess Hours (rerun), Red Balloon (rerun) and Yo-kai Watch (rerun) on Heart of Asia
- April 24: Basta't Kasama Kita (rerun) on Jeepney TV
- April 24: Totoy Bato (2025) on Kapatid Channel, One PH and Sari-Sari Channel
- April 24: Rebelde (ETCerye) on SolarFlix
- April 26: Show Window: The Queen's House (rerun) on Heart of Asia
- April 30: News Patrol on ANC
- May 1: Abante sa Umaga on Abante TV
- May 1: Business Brief on Bilyonaryo News Channel
- May 1: Parallel World (rerun) on Heart of Asia
- May 1: Kung Ako'y Iiwan Mo (rerun), Love Scout, Pangarap na Bituin (rerun) and Precious Hearts Romances Presents: Hiyas on Jeepney TV
- May 1: Love Scout and Senior High (rerun) on Kapamilya Channel
- May 1: Paano ang Pangako? on Kapatid Channel
- May 1: Sagot Kita, Shoutout and True FM Balita Pilipinas on True TV
- May 3: Bagani (rerun) on Jeepney TV
- May 4: Kapatiran Para sa Bayan on DWIZ News TV
- May 6: Pilipinas, Ngayon Na! on DWIZ News TV
- May 8: Balitambayan, Biyaheng IZ, Newscoop, Pasada Balita, Pinoy Gising!, Ronda Pilipinas, Señor Balita, Serbisyong Bayan ni Tatay Rannie, Sulong na Bayan, Up Up Pilipinas and Yes Yes Yo, Topacio on DWIZ News TV
- May 8: Encantadia Chronicles: Sang'gre on GTV
- May 8: When the Sky Falls (rerun) on Heart of Asia
- May 8: Momay (rerun) on Jeepney TV
- May 9: Balitang Paliparan, IZ Balita Sabado, Laban Para sa Karapatan, Pulis @ Ur Serbis and Sa Kabukiran at Kabuhayan on DWIZ News TV
- May 9: From Helen's Kitchen (season 5) on RPTV
- May 10: Anong Say Ni Father, Anong Say Nina Brothers?, DWIZ Network News Weekend, Eye Spotted, Fact or Fake, IZ Balita Linggo, IZ Game Time, Newscoop Weekend and Senior Moments on DWIZ News TV
- May 10: Sunday Blockbusters and TV Patrol Regional (2nd incarnation) on Kapamilya Channel
- May 12: From Helen's Kitchen (season 5) on BuKo Channel
- May 15: Nabi, My Stepdarling (rerun) on Heart of Asia
- May 15: Kambal sa Uma (rerun) and Precious Hearts Romances Presents: Midnight Phantom (rerun) on Jeepney TV
- May 15: Afternoon Delight and Starting Lineup on One News
- May 15: Willingly Yours (2nd incarnation) and Wilyonaryo on WilTV
- May 16: Cooltura (season 3) on DWAN TV
- May 17: Sayanista on DWAN TV
- May 17: Oh My Boss and Queen of the Ring (rerun) on Heart of Asia
- May 17: Kuan on One (seasons 1 to 4) on Kapamilya Channel
- May 21: Rev+ on ANC
- May 22: Never Say Die and The Seed of Love on GTV
- May 22: Put Your Head on My Shoulder (rerun) on Heart of Asia
- May 22: Queen Mantis on Jeepney TV and Kapamilya Channel
- May 23: Matteo G. Primetime on Bilyonaryo News Channel
- May 24: Kampanerang Kuba (rerun) and Playhouse (rerun) on Jeepney TV
- May 26: NegoShow on DWIZ News TV
- May 29: AraBella and Makiling on GTV
- May 29: The Love Trap (rerun) on Heart of Asia
- May 29: News & Views on One News
- May 29: MoJo: Mukha ng Balita on One PH
- May 29: A Secret in Prague on Sari-Sari Channel
- May 30: Just for Laughs Gags on GTV
- May 30: Komiks: Da Adventures of Pedro Penduko (rerun) on Jeepney TV
- May 30: TikTalks (season 3) on One News
- May 30: Inay Ko Po! on One PH and True TV
- May 31: Ancient Love Poetry (rerun) on Heart of Asia
- May 31: TikTalks (season 3) on One PH
- June 4: Legally Speaking (season 1) on DWAN TV
- June 5: Bai Ling Tan (rerun) and Desirable Flowers on Heart of Asia
- June 5: Inay Ko Po! on Kapatid Channel
- June 6: Cine Cinco: Hit na Hit on RPTV
- June 7: The Bureau of Magical Things (season 2) on GTV
- June 12: Me and My Music on DWIZ News TV
- June 12: Agency (rerun) and Now, We Are Breaking Up (rerun) on Heart of Asia
- June 12: Precious Hearts Romances Presents: Impostor (rerun) on Jeepney TV
- June 13: Balitaktakan: Tinig ng Kinabukasan (season 1) on Congress TV
- June 13: Balitaktakan: Tinig ng Kinabukasan (season 1) and Good Stories (season 1) on DWAN TV
- June 14: Love at First Night (rerun) on Heart of Asia
- June 19: Love Your Enemy, Oh My G! (rerun) and The Blood Sisters (rerun) on Jeepney TV
- June 19: Love Your Enemy on Kapamilya Channel
- June 21: The Girl Who Sees Smells (rerun) and Third Rail (rerun) on Heart of Asia
- June 22: A.S.K. All Should Know on DWAN TV
- June 26: Kaya ni Mister, Kaya ni Misis (rerun) on Cine Mo!
- June 26: False Positive (rerun) and The Secrets of Hotel 88 on GTV
- June 26: Bleach (seasons 2 and 3; rerun) on Heart of Asia
- June 26: Nagsimula sa Puso (rerun) and Precious Hearts Romances Presents: Love Me Again on Jeepney TV
- June 26: Kapamilya Blockbusters and Magandang Buhay on Kapamilya Channel
- June 27: Himig at Balita on DWIZ News TV
- June 27: Dr. Stone on Heart of Asia
- June 27: Myx International Top 20 and Pinoy Myx Countdown on Myx
- June 28: KB Family Weekend on Kapamilya Channel
- June 28: Myx Hit Chart on Myx
- June 30: Dr. Love Radio Show on True TV
- July 3: Woke Up Like This! on DWAN TV
- July 3: Jinxed at First (rerun) on Heart of Asia
- July 3: Walang Hanggan (2012; rerun) on Jeepney TV
- July 3: Word of God on One PH
- July 3: Balita Alas Tres, LSS: Love Stories & Songs and Vibe Nights on True TV
- July 4: Vibe on Kapatid Channel, One PH and True TV
- July 10: Abante Pilipinas (2nd incarnation) on Abante News TV
- July 10: Tulay Pilipino on DWIZ News TV
- July 10: When I Marry a Stranger on Heart of Asia
- July 10: Precious Hearts Romances Presents: Kristine (rerun) on Jeepney TV
- July 11: Naked Minds (season 1) on DWAN TV
- July 11: Walang Bolahan on DWIZ News TV
- July 11: Magkaribal (rerun) on Jeepney TV
- July 12: Spy × Family (rerun) on GTV
- July 12: Shop TV on SolarFlix and Solar Sports
- July 17: Love You Stranger on GTV
- July 17: Love Between Fairy and Moon Supreme and You Are My Makeup Artist on Heart of Asia
- July 18: Kalye Sining (season 1) on DWAN TV
- July 18: The Legend of Shen Li (rerun) on Heart of Asia
- July 19: Tubig to Handle: What the Fun! on Kapamilya Channel
- July 21: The Way Forward (season 4) on RPTV
- July 23: Aksyon Kababaihan on DZRH TV
- July 24: Showbiz Talk Ganern and TNT: Tomorrow’s News Tonight on DZRH TV
- July 24: My Name is Busaba (rerun) on Heart of Asia
- July 24: Blood vs Duty and The Alibi: Ang Buong Katotohanan on Jeepney TV and Kapamilya Channel
- July 24: A Secret in Prague and My Bespren Emman on One PH
- July 25: John en Ellen on BuKo Channel
- July 25: Aliens Ninano and Dino Dan (rerun) on Heart of Asia
- July 26: Keep The Faith Sunday Mass on Abante News TV
- July 26: Dok True Ba? (season 4) on DWAN TV
- July 26: The Maid (rerun) on Heart of Asia
- July 31: BalitaOneNan (rerun), DiscoverEats, Fill in the Bank (rerun), Kusina ni Mamang, Niña Niño, Pidol's Wonderland (rerun) and Sine Saya on BuKo Channel
- July 31: Secret Affair (rerun) and The Last Promise (rerun) on Heart of Asia
- July 31: FlordeLiza (rerun), Hanggang Saan (rerun) and TV Patrol Express on Jeepney TV
- August 2: GBU: God Bless U on DZMM TeleRadyo and PRTV Prime Media
- August 2: Berks on Jeepney TV
- August 7: Business Outlook on ANC
- August 7: All New: Jackie Chan Adventures, Endless Love (2019; rerun) and The Cheery Lee, Village Headman on Heart of Asia
- August 7: Gud Morning Kapatid on Kapatid Channel and RPTV
- August 7: Una sa Lahat on True TV
- August 8: Safe Space on DZMM TeleRadyo and PRTV Prime Media
- August 8: Alagang Kapatid, Basta Batas, Inays, Level Up!, One Balita Bai, Power and Play, Ride Radio and Vibe+ on True TV
- August 9: Aprub 'Yan! on DZMM TeleRadyo and PRTV Prime Media
- August 9: Business Matters (season 13) and Word of God on GTV
- August 9: Miracle of Love (rerun) on Heart of Asia
- August 9: Frontline Pilipinas Weekend, Holy Mass Live and Match Made on True TV
- August 13: Frontline Pilipinas and Una sa Lahat on RPTV
- August 14: Kokdu: Season of Deity (rerun) on Heart of Asia
- August 14: Tanging Yaman (rerun) on Jeepney TV
- August 14: Fireworks of My Heart on Kapamilya Channel
- August 14: Amoy Chico, Cristy FerMinute, Frontline Pilipinas, Good Morning Bayan, Heart 2 Heart, One Balita Pilipinas, Perfect Mornings, Sana Lourd, Storycon, Ted Failon at DJ Chacha sa True FM, True Confessions and Wanted sa Radyo on True TV
- August 16: Kiss Goblin (rerun) on Heart of Asia
- August 21: Rewriting Destiny (rerun) on Heart of Asia
- August 21: 100 Days to Heaven (rerun), Dyosa (rerun), Iisa Pa Lamang (rerun) and Prinsesa ng Banyera (rerun) on Jeepney TV
- August 21: Happiness (rerun) and High Street (rerun) on Kapamilya Channel
- August 22: Delightfully Deceitful and Tricky Love on Heart of Asia
- August 23: Kamen Rider Zero-One (rerun) and The Little Prince and Friends on GTV
- August 28: Abante sa Tanghali on Abante News TV
- August 28: Astrophile on Heart of Asia
- August 28: Cine Cinco sa Hapon on RPTV
- August 29: Abante sa Umaga Weekend on Abante News TV
- August 29: Bubu and the Little Owls, Dinoman and Kapamilya Action Sabado on Kapamilya Channel
- August 30: Abante sa Tanghali Weekend on Abante News TV
- August 30: Cine Cinco Weekend Saya and Weekend CinePrime on RPTV
- August 31: Lastikman on Cine Mo!
- September 3: Legally Speaking (season 2) on DWAN TV
- September 4: Balansyado on DZRH TV
- September 4: One Piece (season 17) and The Long Ballad (rerun) on Heart of Asia
- September 4: Precious Hearts Romances Presents: My Cheating Heart (rerun) and We Will Survive (rerun) on Jeepney TV
- September 4: Arangkada Balita on PRTV Prime Media
- September 5: NegoSiyensya (season 1) on GTV
- September 6: Happy Together on GTV
- September 11: Because of You on GTV
- September 11: Huwag Ka Lang Mawawala (rerun) on Jeepney TV
- September 12: Adbokasiya on DZRH TV
- September 12: Master's Daughter (rerun) on GTV
- September 12: Love Revolution on Heart of Asia
- September 18: 46 Days, Beauty and the Guy and Wicked-in-Law on Heart of Asia
- September 18: Lobo (rerun) on Jeepney TV
- September 19: Kung Fu Kids (rerun) and Tabing Ilog (rerun) on Jeepney TV
- September 19: Tulipop on Kapamilya Channel
- September 20: The Heavenly Idol on Heart of Asia
- September 25: First Yaya (rerun) and Grazilda on GTV
- September 25: Queen of Masks on Heart of Asia
- September 25: Born for You (rerun) on Jeepney TV
- September 27: Beautiful Sunday, Chika Vlog and Jukebox Weekend on DWIZ TV
- September 27: Dear Uge on GTV
- October 2: TeleTabloid (2nd incarnation) and Tonite on Abante News TV
- October 2: Exclusive Fairytale, Flames of Vengeance (rerun) and My Love in the Countryside on Heart of Asia
- October 2: Sana Bukas Pa ang Kahapon (rerun) on Jeepney TV
- October 2: A Secret in Prague, Can't Buy Me Love (rerun) and My Bespren Emman on Kapamilya Channel
- October 3: Me Always You on Heart of Asia
- October 4: Pera Talks and TeleTabloid Weekend on Abante News TV
- October 4: Agua Bendita (rerun) on Jeepney TV
- October 4: Everybody, Sing! (season 4) on Kapamilya Channel
- October 9: Snow Eagle Lord (rerun) on Heart of Asia
- October 9: Face to Face with Ate Koring on Kapamilya Channel
- October 11: Presinto 5 (2nd Incarnation) on RPTV
- October 16: Doctor Detective on Heart of Asia
- October 17: Spy × Family and Stealer: The Treasure Keeper on Heart of Asia
- October 18: Kuan on One (season 5), Philippines' Most Shocking Stories (season 1) and Sunday Noontime Blockbusters on Kapamilya Channel
- October 23: Love, Siargao on GTV
- October 23: Gulong ng Palad (2006; rerun) on Jeepney TV
- October 24: Y Speak 2.0 on Kapamilya Channel
- October 25: Mint to Be (rerun) on Heart of Asia
- October 25: Tubig at Langis (rerun) on Jeepney TV
- October 25: Jack and Jill sa Diamond Hills on RPTV
- October 30: Douluo Continent (rerun) on Heart of Asia
- October 30: PRTV News Break on PRTV Prime Media
- October 31: Baby Einstein on Kapamilya Channel
- November 6: 23:23, Duty After School, The Leaves (rerun) and The Lovely Runner on Heart of Asia
- November 6: Bukas na Lang Kita Mamahalin (rerun) on Jeepney TV
- November 7: Panciteria Aroma on Abante News TV
- November 7: 'Yan Tayo on DZMM TeleRadyo
- November 7: One Ordinary Day on GTV
- November 7: Miss Behave and Philippines' Oddest Jobs on Kapamilya Channel
- November 8: Buhay at Kalusugan and The Secret of Health on DZMM TeleRadyo and PRTV Prime Media
- November 13: The Red Sleeve (rerun) on Heart of Asia
- November 13: Kahit Konting Pagtingin (rerun), Mga Anghel na Walang Langit (rerun) and Nang Ngumiti ang Langit (rerun) on Jeepney TV
- November 15: Philippines' Most Haunted on Kapamilya Channel
- November 20: Magkano ang Iyong Dangal? (rerun) on Jeepney TV
- November 20: Falling into Your Smile on Kapamilya Channel

==== Scheduled ====
- November 27: Red Balloon (rerun) on Heart of Asia
- November 27: Someone, Someday on Kapamilya Channel
- December 18: Darating ang Umaga, Huwag Kang Mangamba (rerun) and Mirabella (rerun) on Jeepney TV
- December 19: Familia Zaragoza (rerun) on Jeepney TV
- December 25: The B Side (season 3) on Cinema One
- December 25: Sineserye Presents: May Minamahal (rerun) on Jeepney TV

==== Stopped airing ====
Program	Channel	Last airing	Resumed airing	Reason
Sine Date Weekends	GTV	January 18	March 29	Pre-empted by the 101st season of National Collegiate Athletic Association.
Brgy. 882	DWIZ TV	March 14	July 4	Programming changes.
Politiko Nightly	Abante News TV	May 1	October 5	Program was temporarily replaced by Tonite.
Radyo IZtorya	DWIZ TV	July 10	August 3	Programming changes.
Tao Po!	Kapamilya Channel	July 18	September 5	Program was temporarily replaced by Ibang Level 'To!.
Kapamilya Gold Hits	Kapamilya Channel	July 24	August 24	Program was temporarily replaced by the reruns of Happiness and the remaining episodes of High Street.
Bongga Ka Jhai	DZMM TeleRadyo / PRTV Prime Media	August 2	August 16	Pre-empted by Alerto sa Habagat: The DZMM Special Coverage.
Konek Ka D'yan	DZMM TeleRadyo	August 2	August 16	Pre-empted by Alerto sa Habagat: The DZMM Special Coverage.
Story Outlook	DZMM TeleRadyo / PRTV Prime Media	August 2	August 16	Pre-empted by the special coverage of TV Patrol Weekend.
Travel ni Ahwel	DZMM TeleRadyo / PRTV Prime Media	August 2	August 16	Pre-empted by Alerto sa Habagat: The DZMM Special Coverage.
With Due Respect	PRTV Prime Media	August 2	August 16	Pre-empted by Alerto sa Habagat: The DZMM Special Coverage.
Feel Kita	DZMM TeleRadyo / PRTV Prime Media	August 22	September 5	Pre-empted by Alerto sa Habagat: The DZMM Special Coverage.
S.O.C.O. sa DZMM (2nd incarnation)	DZMM TeleRadyo / PRTV Prime Media	August 22	September 5	Pre-empted by Alerto sa Habagat: The DZMM Special Coverage.
Bongga Ka Jhai	DZMM TeleRadyo / PRTV Prime Media	August 23	September 6	Pre-empted by Alerto sa Habagat: The DZMM Special Coverage.
Dekalibreng Balita	DZMM TeleRadyo / PRTV Prime Media	August 23	September 6	Pre-empted by Alerto sa Habagat: The DZMM Special Coverage.
Iwas-Sakit, Iwas-Gastos	DZMM TeleRadyo / PRTV Prime Media	August 23	September 6	Pre-empted by Alerto sa Habagat: The DZMM Special Coverage.
Panalong Diskarte	DZMM TeleRadyo / PRTV Prime Media	August 23	September 6	Pre-empted by Alerto sa Habagat: The DZMM Special Coverage.
Kapamilya Action Sabado	Kapamilya Channel	August 29	November 14	Program was temporarily replaced by Miss Behave.
Metro Morning	Abante News TV / Bilyonaryo News Channel	October 2	October 12	Programming break.

=== Video streaming services ===
- January 2: All TV News: Top of the Hour on Facebook (All TV News)
- January 2: I Love You Since 1892 on Viva One
- January 7: Benta Nights on iWant
- January 10: S.O.C.O.: Scene of the Crime Operatives (2nd incarnation; season 1) on iWant
- January 13: AFAM Wives Club on iWant
- January 14: Philippines' Most Shocking Stories (season 2) on YouTube (ABS-CBN News)
- March 3: Possessed (season 2) on YouTube (ABS-CBN News)
- March 4: Rated R: The Rico Hizon Podcast on YouTube (ABS-CBN News)
- March 10: Roja on Netflix
- March 11: Roja on iWant
- March 14: Golden Scenery of Tomorrow on Viva One
- March 17: Kuan on One (season 4) on iWant and YouTube (ABS-CBN Entertainment)
- March 17: What Lies Beneath on Netflix
- March 18: What Lies Beneath on iWant
- March 19: The Next Big Band on YouTube (ABS-CBN Entertainment)
- March 22: iWant ASAP on Facebook and YouTube (iWant)
- April 24: The Silent Noise on Amazon Prime Video
- May 14: Philippine Hometown Stories on YouTube (ABS-CBN News)
- May 19: Philippines' Most Shocking Stories (season 3) on YouTube (ABS-CBN News)
- June 5: Hell University on Viva One
- June 19: Love Is Never Gone on Amazon Prime Video
- June 19: The Secrets of Hotel 88 on iWant
- June 20: Project Loki on Cignal Play and Viva One
- June 28: Kumusta on Viu
- June 30: Philippines' Strangest Mysteries on YouTube (ABS-CBN News)
- July 17: The Alibi: Ang Buong Katotohanan on iWant
- July 17: Viva's Next Big Star on Viva One
- July 21: Blood vs Duty on Netflix
- July 22: Blood vs Duty on iWant
- July 31: Nurse the Dead on iWant
- August 5: Miss Behave on iWant
- August 14: The Loyalty Game on Amazon Prime Video
- August 14: NewsWatch Now (2nd incarnation) on YouTube (NewsWatch Plus)
- August 20: Come Dine with Me: Celebrity Philippines on HBO Max
- August 29: My Husband is a Mafia Boss on Viva One
- August 29: Matteo G. Primetime on YouTube (Matteo Guidicelli)
- September 1: Kuan on One (season 5) on iWant and YouTube (ABS-CBN Entertainment)
- September 2: Hello Outside World on YouTube (ABS-CBN Entertainment)
- September 5: Love, Siargao on Viu
- September 11: Love U Lots on Viva One
- September 25: Dating Alys Perez on Viva One
- September 29: A Secret in Prague on Netflix
- October 1: Call My Manager on HBO Max
- October 3: From Vlog to Love on YouTube (GMA Network)
- October 17: Patrol on the GO on YouTube (ABS-CBN News)
- November 5: Philippines' Most Haunted on YouTube (ABS-CBN News)

==== Scheduled ====
- November 24: Someone, Someday on Netflix
- November 25: BINIverse and Chorus and Someone, Someday on iWant
- November 25: BINIverse and Chorus on YouTube (iWant)
- December 11: Honor Thy Mother on Amazon Prime Video

== Networks ==
The following are a list of free-to-air and cable channels or networks launches and closures in 2026.

=== Launches ===
Date	Station	Type	Channel	Source
January 1	Fight Plus	FAST/linear channel	Blast TV (OTT); Samsung TV Plus (FAST)	
January 1	Premier Tennis (2nd incarnation)	Cable and satellite	Sky Cable Channel 265 (Metro Manila); Sky Direct Channel 49 (Nationwide); Blast TV (OTT)	
January 25	WilTV	Cable and satellite	Cignal Channel 10 (Nationwide); SatLite Channel 10 (Nationwide)	
February 6	TVB Jade	Cable and satellite	Cignal Channel 280 (Nationwide)	
February 6	TVB Xing He	Cable and satellite	Cignal Channel 281 (Nationwide)	
February 6	TVB News	Cable and satellite	Cignal Channel 284 (Nationwide)	
February 6	Asian Action Channel	Cable and satellite	Cignal Channel 282 (Nationwide)	
February 14	Ani-Blast	FAST/linear channel	Blast TV (OTT); Samsung TV Plus (FAST)	
April 1	TVB Entertainment News	Cable and satellite	Cignal Channel 285 (Nationwide)	
April 1	TVB Lifestyle	Cable and satellite	Cignal Channel 283 (Nationwide)	
April 25	AllRadio TV	Cable and satellite	Planet Cable Channel 3 (Provincial)	
July 8	DotTV	Cable and satellite	Cignal Channel 107 (Nationwide)	
September 7	NCAA NXT	Cable and satellite	Cignal Channel 264 (Nationwide); SatLite Channel 53 (Nationwide)	
October 1	Senate TV	Free-to-air	Channel 17 (digital feed)	
October 10	E-Novation TV	Free-to-air	Channel 21 (digital feed)	
November 15	Rock X Stream	Cable and satellite	Cignal Channel 234 (Nationwide); SatLite Channel 92 (Nationwide)	

=== Rebranded ===
Date	Rebranded from	Rebranded to	Type	Channel	Source
October 10	Shop TV	E-Novation TV	Free-to-air	Channel 21 (digital feed)	

=== Closures ===
Date	Station	Type	Channel	Sign-on debut	Source
January 1	TVUP	Cable and satellite	Cignal Channel 101 (Nationwide)	October 11, 2022	
May 8	Xing Kong	Cable and satellite	Converge Vision / Sky TV Channel 127 (Metro Manila)	December 5, 2001	
May 22	WilTV	Cable and satellite	Cignal Channel 10 (Nationwide); SatLite Channel 10 (Nationwide)	January 25	
June 1	Sari-Sari Channel	Cable and satellite	Cignal Channel 3 (Nationwide); Kabayan Broadband Channel 75 (Nationwide); SatLite Channel 30 (Nationwide)	January 15, 2016	
July 12	Shop TV	Free-to-air	Channel 21 (digital feed)	November 1, 2005	
August 1	BuKo	Cable and satellite	Cignal Channel 2 (Nationwide); SatLite Channel 2 (Nationwide)	August 2, 2021	
August 15	GCTV	Cable and satellite	Cignal Channel 185 (Nationwide)	August 15, 2016	
August 15	True TV	Cable and satellite	Cignal Channel 19 (Nationwide); SatLite Channel 19 (Nationwide)	May 1, 2024	
September 30	DWAN TV	Free-to-air	Channel 17 (digital feed)	July 3, 2024	

== Services ==
The following are a list of television operators or providers and streaming media platforms or services launches and closures in 2026.

=== Launches ===
Date	Provider	Type	Stream	Source
August 15	GCTV	Digital/Multicasting	YouTube (GCTV Digital)	
October 7	ESPN	VOD OTT streaming media (content hub)	Disney+	

=== Rebranded ===
The following is a list of streaming providers that have made or will make noteworthy service rebrands in 2026.

Date	Rebranded from	Rebranded to	Type	Stream	Source
February 8	GMA Network App	GMA Play	Freemium OTT streaming media platform	—N/a	

=== Closures ===
Date	Provider	Type	Sign-on debut	Stream	Source
June 5	Paramount+	VOD OTT streaming media	May 23, 2025	Blast TV	
July 31	Cignal Super	OTT streaming media aggregator	May 31, 2025	—N/a	
July 31	Cotabato Cable	Cable television provider	January 1, 1991	—N/a	

== Deaths ==
January

- January 13
  - Roni Bertubin (b. 1964), filmmaker (Love Birds, Sikil, and Crying Ladies)
  - Sara Jane Paez (b. 1968), beauty queen (Binibining Pilipinas–Universe 1989)
- January 22 – Raoul Aragon (b. 1947), actor
- January 25 – Freddie Abando (b. 1952), former news reporter of PTV, and news manager and anchor of GNN
- January 28
  - Fr. Isabelo "Bel" San Luis, SVD (b. 1944), newspaper columnist of Manila Bulletin and Tempo, radio host of DZMM and Executive producer of Family TV Mass
  - William Mayo (b. 1955), film director

February

- February 12 – Vangie Labalan (b. 1943), actress
- February 13 – Lullete Jane Ramilo (b. 1993), beauty queen (Miss Philippines Earth 2013)
- February 19 – Ricardo Villegas (b. 1936), journalist
- February 26 – Pepito Rodriguez (b. 1942), actor (Sa Bilis Walang Kaparis)

March

- March 9 – Heidi Sison (b. 1940), movie director, television and radio host
- March 23 – Fred Salanga (b. 1949), journalist

April

- April 2 – Misua (b. 1998), drag performer
- April 6 — Michelle O'Bombshell (b. 1977), comedian
- April 14 — Sue Prado (b. 1981), actress (Oro, Barber's Tales, Manila Skies)
- April 25 — Braggy Braganza (b. 1968), voice over announcer, radio jock

May

- May 11 — Misael "Boy" Gonzales Jr. (b. 1959), reporter and anchor (DZRH)
- May 13 — Eduardo "Ed Finlan" Valdez (b. 1959), actor, director and executive producer (People's Television Network)
- May 31 — Aly Pagaduan (b. 1997), singer and vocalist (Sleep Alley)

June

- June 8 — Bing Austria (b. 1964), musician
- June 11 — Jaime Federico "Jimmy" Gil (b. 1947), reporter (GMA News), anchor and radio announcer (DZBB)
- June 22 — Michael Sandico (b. 1963), actor

July

- July 23 — Jose Sison (b. 1938), columnist, lawyer and host of Ipaglaban Mo!

August

- August 2
  - Jobert Sucaldito (b. 1961), columnist, show business reporter and former radio host of DZMM
  - Romeo Jalosjos Sr. (b. 1940), founder and chairman of TAPE Inc.
- August 9 — Antonio Soriano (b. 1938), veteran broadcast engineer (Radio Philippines Network and ZOE Broadcasting Network)
- August 19 — Vanessa Rangadhol (b. 1995), singer and former member of Sugarpop

September

- September 1 – Monti Parungao (b. 1968), director (Survivor Philippines, Madrasta, Las Hermanas)
- September 13 – Recah Trinidad (b. 1943), sports journalist and father of late Chino Trinidad
- September 14 – Eugenia Apostol (b. 1925), journalist and publisher, founder of the Philippine Daily Inquirer

October

- October 6 – Jaspher Cabangon, singer (death announced on this date)
- October 11 – Erlinda Villalobos (b. 1942), actress (Ekstra and Manang Biring)
- October 12 – Adrian Loterte, journalist (DWQA)
- October 17 – Randy See (b. 1991), model, actor and television host
- October 19 – Weng dela Fuente–Deimoy (b. 1970), former president of Eagle Broadcasting Corporation and broadcast journalist (Net 25)
- October 20 – Edwin Balasa (b. 1968), journalist, reporter (Abante and Abante News TV)
- October 26 – May Bayot–de Castro (b. 1965), theater actress and singer

November

- November 1 – Gil "Ate Gay" Morales (b. 1971), stand-up comedian, television host, impersonator of Nora Aunor
- November 17 – Jorrybell Agoto (b. 1994), actress (Filipiñana)

== See also ==
- 2026 in television
