= The People Have Spoken =

2026 Philippine television game show

- Title card
- Genre: Game show
- Created by: Marcelo "Loi" Landicho
- Directed by: Arnel Natividad
- Creative director: Caesar Cosme
- Presented by: Heart Evangelista; Sean Lucas
- Theme music composer: Tata Betita
- Opening theme: "The People Have Spoken" by Chanty Videla
- Country of origin: Philippines
- Original language: Tagalog
- No. of episodes: 20

Production
- Executive producer: Marcy Ibarrientos
- Camera setup: Multiple-camera setup
- Running time: 60 minutes
- Production company: GMA Entertainment Group

Original release
- Network: GMA Network
- Release: June 6 – October 17, 2026

The People Have Spoken is a 2026 Philippine television game show broadcast by GMA Network. Hosted by Heart Evangelista and Sean Lucas, it premiered on June 6, 2026 on the network's Sabado Star Power sa Gabi line up. The show concluded on October 17, 2026 with a total of 20 episodes.

== Premise ==
The show challenges celebrity contestants to guess the more popular sentiment among a studio audience of 100 people regarding various current topics and social issues. It focuses on everyday public opinion rather than right or wrong facts.

== Hosts ==
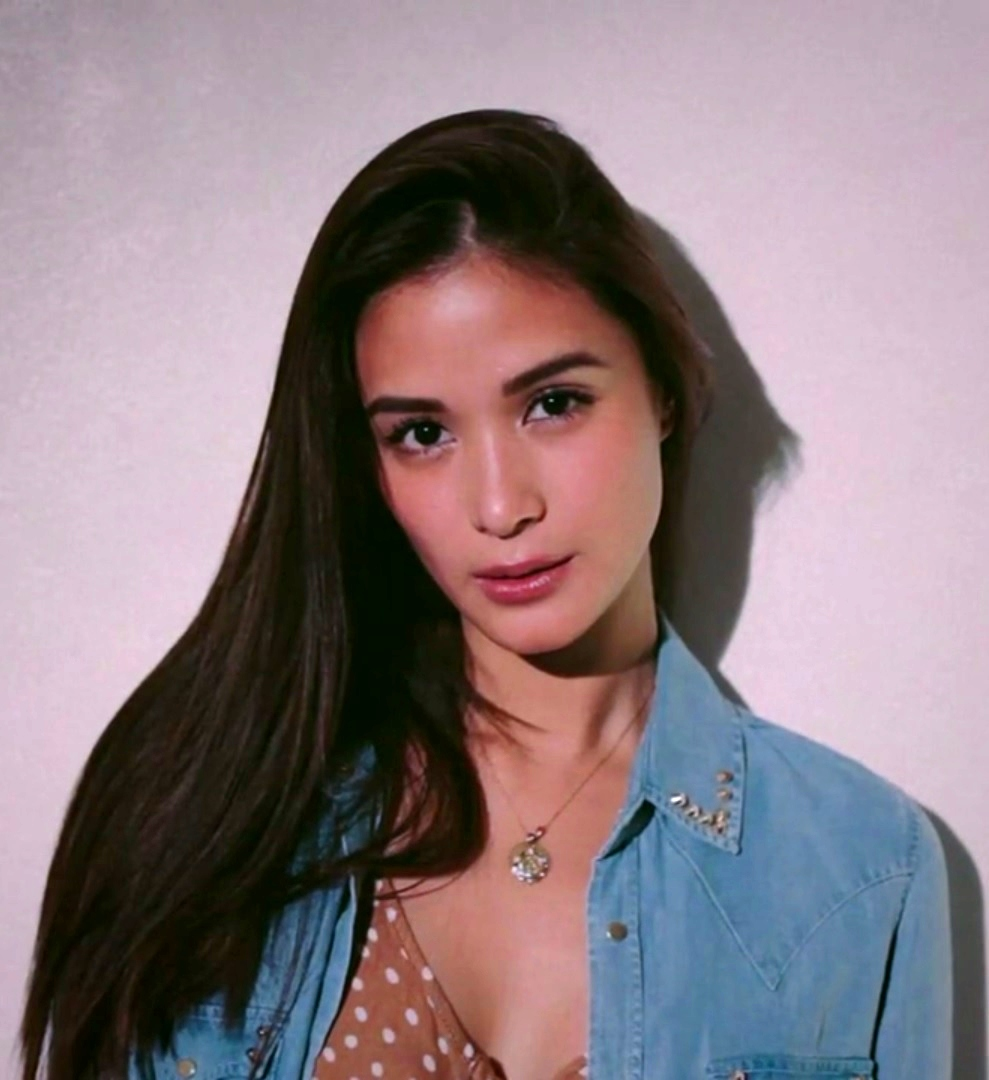
Heart Evangelista serves as a host.

- Heart Evangelista
- Sean Lucas

== Ratings ==
According to AGB Nielsen Philippines' Nationwide Urban Television Audience Measurement People in television homes, the pilot episode of The People Have Spoken earned a 5.7% rating.
