= Heart World =

Philippine television reality show

- Season 2 title card
- Genre: Reality show
- Written by: Haydee Bellen; Buboy Carreon
- Directed by: Rico Guttierez
- Creative director: Rico Guttierez
- Starring: Heart Evangelista
- Music by: Paolo Almaden
- Country of origin: Philippines
- Original language: Tagalog
- No. of seasons: 2
- No. of episodes: 27

Production
- Executive producer: Marcy Ibarrientos
- Producers: Heart Evangelista; AJ Pangilinan; Retty Contreras
- Editors: Ace Talacay; Edwin Thaddeus Borja; Koko Arellano; Khatte June Monsato; MM Garcia
- Camera setup: Multiple-camera setup
- Running time: 25–27 minutes
- Production company: GMA Entertainment Group

Original release
- Network: GMA Network
- Release: October 26, 2024 – June 20, 2026

Heart World is a Philippine television reality show broadcast by GMA Network. Directed by Rico Guttierez, it stars Heart Evangelista. It premiered on October 26, 2024, on the network's Sabado Star Power sa Gabi line up. The second season premiered on March 7, 2026. The show concluded on June 20, 2026.

The show is streaming online on YouTube.

== Premise ==
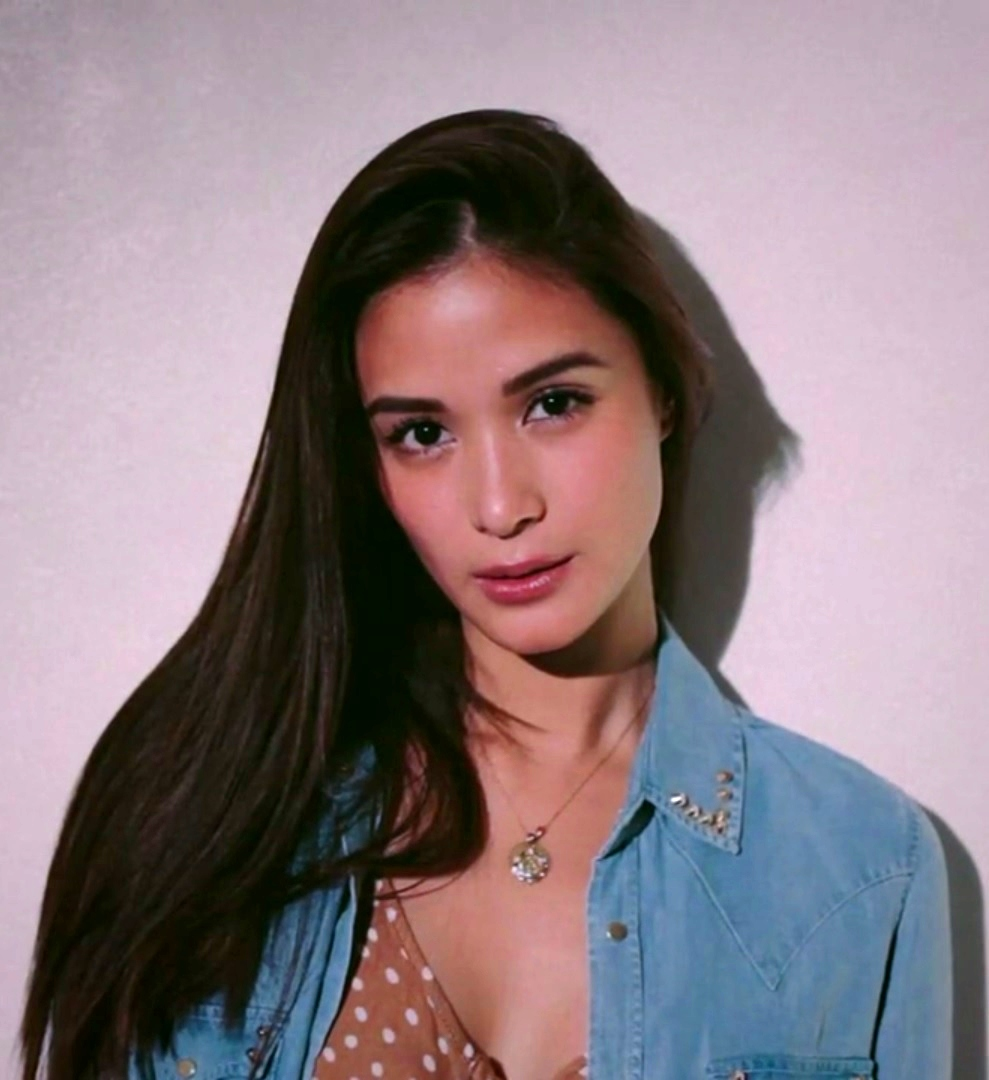
Heart Evangelista stars in the reality show.

Heart World explores the life of Philippine actress, Heart Evangelista behind the "glamorous" self that everybody sees and her heartful moments in the model industry.

== Ratings ==
According to AGB Nielsen Philippines' Nationwide Urban Television Audience Measurement People in Television Homes, the pilot episode of Heart World earned a 3.5% rating.
