= Usap-usapan: What We Know So Far =

2026 Philippine television news and information show

- Title card
- Genre: News broadcasting; Infotainment
- Directed by: Conrado Lumabas III
- Country of origin: Philippines
- Original language: Tagalog

Production
- Producer: Darvin De Mesa
- Production locations: GMA Network Center, Quezon City, Philippines
- Camera setup: Multiple-camera setup
- Running time: 20–27 minutes
- Production company: GMA News

Original release
- Network: GTV
- Release: September 14, 2026 – present

Usap-usapan: What We Know So Far is a 2026 Philippine television news and information program broadcast by GTV. Presented by journalists from GMA News' Team Totoo, it premiered on September 14, 2026.

The show is streaming online on YouTube.

== Overview ==
The program is centered on verification journalism, examining viral posts, circulating rumors, breaking developments, and other claims receiving public attention. The program is presented by GMA News' Team Totoo, a group of experienced journalists who investigate claims, consult available sources, and assess information to know what has been confirmed, debunked, or unclear.
