= Good and Evil (Chinese TV series) =

- Chinese: 百灵潭
- Hanyu Pinyin: Bǎilíng tán
- Genre: Fantasy, Wuxia, Romance, Xianxia
- Based on: Good and Evil (百灵潭) by Wu Yu
- Written by: Mu Jing Wen
- Directed by: Huang Chun
- Starring: Guo Junchen; Kang Ning; Wei Tianhao; Ou Tianrui; He Meixuan; Li Mingjun; Zong Yuanyuan; Chen Zhengyang; Wu Mansi; Dong Chunhui; Zhao Ziqi
- Country of origin: China
- Original language: Mandarin
- No. of seasons: 1
- No. of episodes: 32

Production
- Producer: Yan Xiaorui
- Production companies: Mango TV; Morning Star Prosperity; Huahai Films; TT Voice; Orange Fire; Star Airlines Films

Original release
- Network: Mango TV
- Release: August 22 – September 12, 2021

Good and Evil (Chinese: 舌尖上的心跳; pinyin: Shéjiān shàng de xīntiào) is a Chinese drama based on the novel of the same name by the writer Wu Yu, directed by Huang Chun, starring Guo Junchen and Kang Ning, and co-starred by Wei Tianhao, Ou Tianrui, he Meixuan, Li Mingjun, Zong Yuanyuan, Chen Zhengyang, Wu Mansi, Dong Chunhui and Zhao Ziqi. It tells the story of Chun Yao, the king of all demons, and Han Sheng, the unlucky princess, who collect old books and recall the past. The hero and heroine of the task experienced the love, hatred, greed, hatred and ignorance of various spirits, and finally returned to their own emotional world. The drama will be broadcast on Mango TV on August 22, 2021.

== Plot ==
It was the fairy who guarded the demons of Wangchuan, but was demoted due to a mistake, and became the king of all demons in Bailingtan—Chun Yao (played by Guo Junchen), had to take the hapless princess Han Sheng (played by Kang Ning) of Beilu Kingdom to open the A mythical journey of searching for "Su Shu" and avoiding "Millennium Calamity". Han Sheng enters Bailingtan and finds that he is carrying a book that only monsters have on him, so he follows the spring demon to explore the mystery of the book, and experiences touching stories together, and gradually falls in love with the one who does not know what to say. One, the arrogant and conceited owner of the pool.

The fledgling righteous little Taoist Bu Fan (played by Au Tianrui) meets Baishan (played by He Meixuan), a fan who tempts the lives of women in the world in exchange for his appearance to collect Yangshou for her husband Asu, and the two sides start to entangle.

Kong Qi (played by Li Mingjun) who silently guards his beloved one and Princess Xueyu Baituo Xiaoshan (played by Zong Yuanyuan) of the God of War Xiao family, after going through a lot of love, finally understand the original face of love. Love is like a cloud of mist, and we must cherish the people in front of us.

Shen Ci (played by Wu Mansi), the red-feathered fishman, fell in love with Xie Changye (played by Chen Zhengyang), the proton of the Northern Land, voluntarily endured the severe pain, took off the fish tail, and followed Xie Changye to become the dead man by his side. The two were in a struggle for power, rely on each other, but also consume each other's enthusiasm in the unnecessary sacrifices again and again.

Avalokitesvara's avatar of water from a clean bottle, Wuxian (played by Dong Chunhui), was sent to raise Sitong (played by Zhao Ziqi), and waited for Sitong to grow up and be destroyed together with the demonic energy of Yaoyuan. However, in the process of raising Si Tong, the two developed a strong teacher-student relationship, father-son relationship. After learning that the meaning of his life is to be destroyed, Si Tong finally becomes a demon.

== Cast ==
=== Main ===
Role	Actor	Dub	Description	Ref
Chun Yao	Guo Junchen	Hu Liangwei		
Han Sheng/Han Tan/Xie Changwan	Kang Ning	Xu Jiaqi		
Simao/Lingjun	Wei Tianhao	Sun Langlang		

=== Supporting ===
Role	Actor	Dubbed	Description	Ref
Bai Shan	He Meixuan	Zhao Mengjiao		
Bu Fan	Qu Tianrui	Wei Yifan		
Xiaoshan	Zong Yuanyuan	Liu Qing		
Kong Qi	Li Mingjun	Li Xin		
Shen Ci	Wu Mansi	Liu Rui		
Xie Changye	Chen Zhengyang	Shunzi		
Si Tong	Zhao Ziqi	Li Jing		
boundless	Dong Chunhui	Ma Yufei		
