= Kagat ng Dilim =

Philippine horror anthology television series

- Title card (2020 revival)
- Genre: Horror anthology series
- Created by: Erik Matti
- Written by: Dwight Gaston; Randy Q. Villanueva; Michael Bernaldez; Trisha Delez; Rio Legaspi; Anton Pelon; Roni Benaid
- Directed by: Lawrence Fajardo; Richard Somes; Rae Red; Topel Lee; Paul Basinillo
- Country of origin: Philippines
- Original language: Filipino
- No. of seasons: 2000 version: 3; 2020 version: 1
- No. of episodes: 13

Production
- Executive producer: Vic del Rosario Jr.
- Production location: Philippines
- Running time: 60 minutes
- Production companies: Cignal Entertainment; Viva Television

Original release
- Network: IBC (2000-2002); TV5 (2020-2021)
- Release: June 10, 2000 – March 21, 2021

Kagat ng Dilim (transl. Nightfall) is a Philippine horror-drama anthology television series that is produced by Viva Television and premiered on Intercontinental Broadcasting Corporation (IBC) from June 10, 2000 to 2002 and later revived on TV5 from November 27, 2020 to March 21, 2021.

== See also ==
- Kapatid Channel
- List of programs broadcast by TV5 (Philippine TV network)
- List of programs broadcast by Intercontinental Broadcasting Corporation
