= 2024 in radio =

The following is a list of events affecting radio broadcasting in 2024. Events listed include radio program debuts, finales, cancellations, station launches, closures, and format changes, as well as information about controversies and deaths of radio personalities.

== Notable events ==
=== January ===
Date	Event	Source
1	In Metro Manila, Philippines, FM radio station DWOW relaunches as All Radio 103.5, with a Soft AC format. The rebranding aligns with its TV counterpart All TV, and the businesses owned by former politician and businessman Manny Villar.	
4	KTFS/940-Texarkana, Texas, switches from its gospel format to sports as ESPN Radio. This change brings ESPN Radio back to the market after the former KTRG’s license was returned to the F.C.C. for cancellation on November 8, 2023.	
13	Philippine Collective Media Corporation (PCMC) officially relaunches the FMR brand as "FM Radio". Coinciding with the relaunch, DYWF-Cebu returns on-air; this time branded as "FM Radio 93.1", to be operated by PCMC.	
21	Canadian broadcaster Meredith Shaw launches the Sunday morning program The Feel Good Brunch on CHFI-FM—Toronto and other adult contemporary radio stations owned by Rogers Radio across Canada.	
29	The Canadian CBC Radio One network rebrands its national 6 p.m. newscast from The World at Six to Your World Tonight.	

=== February ===
Date	Event	Source
5	Manila Broadcasting Company in the Philippines reverts from the FM radio brand Yes the Best to its original name Yes! FM.	
6	Manila Broadcasting Company is rebranded as MBC Media Group	
6	Linda Wertheimer announces her retirement from NPR after 53 years with the American public radio network.	
8	iHeartRadio Canada, the radio division of Bell Media, announces the divestiture of 45 stations in rural and smaller markets, constituting nearly half of its station count, stating that the business of small market radio was failing. The stations will be split up among multiple, mostly independent, broadcasters.	
24	CBC Radio One in Canada introduces Just Asking, a Saturday afternoon call-in show hosted by Saroja Coelho.	

=== March ===
Date	Event	Source
31	BBC Radio 4 stops broadcasting opt-outs on longwave and will permanently simulcast the FM service until the longwave transmitters get turned off for good.	

=== April ===
Date	Event	Source
9	Local community station The Voice 2 begins broadcasting on DAB digital radio in North Devon, UK.	
15	BBC Radio 4 turns off its mediumwave transmitters forever after they served as LW relays for areas with a weak LW signal.	
15	CBS Sports Radio rebrands as Infinity Sports Network, resurrecting the Infinity brand used by one of the predecessors to its owner, Audacy, Inc. The move comes four years after the originally planned expiration of a licensing agreement with CBS Sports. Audacy and CBS issued cease and desist orders to all Infinity affiliates to stop any further use of the CBS brand.	
15	In Manila, Philippines, DWAV – broadcasting as Wave 89.1 – quietly made its final broadcast, and Adventist Media took over the station's operations, effectively reformatted as AWR Manila 89.1.	
15	In Davao, Philippines, Brigada News FM transferred its broadcast from 91.5 (owned by Primax Broadcasting) to 93.1 (owned by Mareco Broadcasting Network).	
22	Asian Sound Radio gets merged into Lyca Radio after they acquired Lyca Media acquired Asian Sound's license. Lyca Radio expands their mediumwave transmissions into Greater Manchester.	
22	Gow Media announces the closure of US radio network SportsMap, after 33 years of operation, with stations being switched to the betting-centric Vegas Stats & Information Network.	
30	Gold turns off their final mediumwave transmitter in Manchester for good along with Smooth Radio's mediumwave transmitters in Kent and Hampshire.	

=== May ===
Date	Event	Source
5	Genesis Communications Network ceases operations after 26 years. The broadcast syndication company, whose best-known hosts include Alex Jones and Michael Medved, will migrate its remaining programming to competing networks.	
20	Wisconsin Public Radio realigns its statewide over-the-air services, with its "Ideas Network" and "NPR News & Music" networks retired in favor of one solely for NPR news and local and national talk programming (WPR News) and one devoted exclusively to classical and other music genres (WPR Music).	
24	K240EL in Austin, Texas flips to red dirt/classic country as "Austin's 95.9 Texas Country" after roughly five and a half years with classic hip-hop.	

=== June ===
Date	Event	Source
14	USA Radio Network ends its hourly newscast service after several decades of operation.	
20	Philippine radio station DWAN-AM, owned by Intercontinental Broadcasting Corporation, returns to operation with a full service format after 13 years of hiatus.	

=== July ===
Date	Event	Source
1	Interactive Broadcast Media, owner of DWWW-Metro Manila, began operating DWHT, an FM radio station in Dagupan, Philippines; enacted as a relay station of DWWW.	
8	DWSS-AM (owned by Supreme Broadcasting System) was return to Airwaves as DWAR Abante Radyo 1494 (operated by Prage Management Corporation) after 4 years of hiatus.	
9	Coloff Media announces the purchase of radio stations KMAQ (1320 AM) and KMAQ-FM (95.1 FM) in Maquoketa, Iowa, United States, from Dennis Voy.	
15	Philippine radio station DZRH celebrates its 85th anniversary.	
31	The Philippine radio station Mellow 94.7, under the FBS Radio Network, temporarily dropped the Mellow branding and was known as simply 94.7 (pronounced “ninety-four-point-seven”).	

=== August ===
Date	Event	Source
14	One month short of the station's 97th anniversary, owner Corus Entertainment suddenly shuts down CHML—Hamilton, Ontario.	
26	Good Karma Brands moves New York City's ESPN Radio affiliation, which has been on FM 98.7 since 2012, to AM 880, changing its callsign to WHSQ. The move comes due to the end of Good Karma's local marketing agreement with 98.7 licensee Emmis Communications at the end of the month, with Good Karma striking a new LMA with WHSQ's owner Audacy, the owner of ESPN's rival WFAN. The move ends a 57-year run for 880 as New York's all-news radio station, and the end of the station's 96-year run as CBS Radio Network's flagship station, 78 of those years under the call sign WCBS. WCBS's remaining programming merged onto its sister station and erstwhile rival WINS beginning August 26.	

=== September ===
Date	Event	Source
7	Westwood One returns its Saturday night classic country request program Country Gold, which has been on-air since the early 1990s, to its previous format with a professional radio disc jockey as host, as Steve Harmon takes over the program. For the previous 12 years, Country Gold (previously Country Gold Saturday Night) had been hosted by famous country musicians, as Randy Owen hosted from 2012 to 2016, followed by Terri Clark from 2016 to 2024.	
24	After an 11-month trial run on several of iHeartMedia's owned-and-operated stations, Premiere Networks introduces a nationwide conservative talk morning show hosted by Michael DelGiorno. iHeart, although it had maintained a nearly full slate of daily conservative talk programming for the previous two decades, had not offered a morning drive time show to its stations, as most of the U.S.-based company's stations had programmed local morning shows, regionally syndicated offerings or shows from unrelated formats until the company's long-running personnel reductions made such programs untenable.	
30	The Thistle & Shamrock, an NPR program devoted to Celtic music, will end its 43-year run as host Fiona Ritchie moves on to other endeavors.	

=== October ===
Date	Event	Source
3	DWLL, under FBS Radio Network, reverts into Mellow 94.7, now operated by Prage Management Corporation, which also owns the daily newspaper Abante, AM radio station Abante Radyo 1494, and Bilyonaryo News Channel.	
7	Cumulus Media closes its last remaining New York metropolitan area asset, suburban AM station WFAS in White Plains, without attempting a sale. WFAS had ceased analog broadcasting in 2021, operating solely as a digital station from then until its closure.	
10	WLKK-HD2 Wethersfield, New York becomes the first non-stunting station in North America to flip to Christmas music for the 2024 season and reactivates its social media presence a year after the former 102.5 WTSS left analog FM.	
20	A helicopter crashes into a radio transmission tower in Houston, Texas, resulting in at least 4 deaths. The accident knocks two stations which transmit from the tower off the air, KLTN and KAMA-FM (both owned by Uforia Audio Network).	
30	LBC News ends broadcasts on 1152 kHz medium wave, and broadcast a retune loop redirecting listeners to retune to digital reception.	

=== November ===
Date	Event	Source
4	In Metro Manila, Philippines, DWFM 92.3 FM (formerly 92.3 Radyo5 True FM) moved to DWLA 105.9 FM, replacing Neo Retro 1059 after nearly 4 years. It is now known as 105.9 True FM. In Davao City, Philippines, DXFM 101.9 FM (formerly 101.9 Radyo5 True FM Davao) moved to DXET 106.7 FM, replacing Radyo Digoseño (owned by the City Government of Digos), marking the return of TV5's operations on this frequency after a 13-year hiatus as Dream FM (2004–2011), albeit as an airtime lease operator.	
4	Philippine Collective Media Corporation (PCMC) launched Favorite Music Radio in Manila on DWFM 92.3 FM, with relay stations in Baguio, Davao, and General Santos, replacing the former frequencies of Nation Broadcasting Corporation.	
6	XEPRS-AM Tijuana, a Mexican border blaster serving the San Diego market, flips to an oldies format featuring mostly deceased hosts such as Wolfman Jack, Don Steele and Charlie Tuna.	

=== December ===
Date	Event	Source
2	Zone Corp, a broadcaster serving the Bangor, Maine region, announces the pending shutdown of all of its radio stations (WZON, WKIT and WZLO) after the withdrawal of its major financial backer, horror novelist Stephen King. The company had never been profitable and had largely been subsidized by King's other ventures, something he stated he was no longer willing to do as he approached old age and needed to stabilize his own financial situation. WKIT, in part due to its stronger ratings and market position, would later be spared from closure when a local business partnership operating under the name Rock Lobster Radio agreed to purchase the station from King.	
3	Sage Alerting Systems announces it will no longer manufacture the 3644 ENDEC, one of only three Emergency Alert System encoders available in the United States and the only such encoder built primarily for radio. (Competing encoders by Digital Alert Systems and Trilithic have mainly been designed for television.) Sage cited the existing encoders' durability and long usage life, increasing difficulty in acquiring replacement parts, and a "bursty" sales market that peaked mainly during low-power broadcast license expansion windows. The Federal Communications Commission requires every AM and FM radio station licensed in the United States to have an EAS encoder.	
31	Salem Media Group announces the divestiture of The Fish, its contemporary Christian music radio network, and all of the owned-and-operated stations in said network to rival Christian broadcaster Educational Media Foundation, which will dissolve the network into its own brands, K-Love and Air1, upon closure of the sale in 2025.	

== Deaths ==
- January 6 – Peter Dixon "Dix" Davis, 97, American child actor in radio and film (inc. "Randolph" on A Date With Judy, "Pinky" on One Man's Family, "Alvin Fuddle" in Blondie, and "Belly Laugh Barton" on The Jack Benny Show; also "Stanley" on Hap Hazard, "Brad Burton" in The Second Mrs. Burton and "Robert Barton" on The Charlotte Greenwood Show)
- January 9 – Karel Janovický, 93, Czech-born composer, pianist and radio producer (BBC World Service).
- January 11 – Robin Brownlee, 65, Canadian sports journalist and radio host (CFRN)
- January 26 – Walter Love, 88, Northern Irish broadcaster (BBC Radio Ulster).
- January 31 – Joe Madison, 74, American radio talk-show host (SiriusXM Urban View, WOL).
- February 6 – Chuck Dickerson, 86, American football player and coach, and longtime radio host for WGR
- February 7 – Mojo Nixon, 66, American rockabilly musician (numerous shows for Sirius Satellite Radio)
- February 10 – Bob Edwards, 76, American radio host and journalist (All Things Considered, Morning Edition, Bob Edwards Weekend)
- February 12 – Steve Wright, 69, English radio personality (Steve Wright in the Afternoon, Pick of the Pops)
- February 28 – Bob Heil, 83, American organist, sound engineer (founder of Heil Sound), amateur radio operator (K9EID) and host (Organ Music on WTWW, Ham Nation on TWiT)
- March 8 – Ramya Wanigasekara, 73, Sri Lankan actress, singer, and radio broadcaster
- March 10 – Svetlana Morgunova, 84, Russian television and radio host
- April 3 – "Young Ron" Brewer, age unknown. Co-host of The Paul and Young Ron Show on WBGG-FM.
- April 10 – Mister Cee, 57, American hip-hop disc jockey
- April 26 – Graham Webb, 88, Australian radio and TV broadcaster
- April 27 – Andy Santillan, 65, Filipino disc jockey of DWRR & DWAV (now Adventist World Radio Manila 89.1) and Filipino voice over announcer of Radio Philippines Network
- April 28 – Francis Cardona, 64, Filipino veteran broadcaster, creator, producer and host of Asenso Ka Pinoy
- May 15 – Washington Rodrigues, 87, Brazilian sports commentator
- May 29 – Bob Rogers, 97, Australian DJ and radio broadcaster
- June 5 – Petter Nome, 69, Norwegian journalist, founder of Radio Oslo (cancer)
- June 24 – Tom Kent, 69, American syndicated radio host best known for his classic hits programs (cancer)
- July 9 – Joe Bonsall, 76, American country singer (member of the Grand Ole Opry by way of membership in The Oak Ridge Boys)
- July 12 – Ruth Westheimer, 96, German/Israeli/American sex therapist and talk show host
- July 13 – Ron E Sparks, 72, Australian broadcaster
- July 17 – David Morrow, 71, Australian sports commentator (Radio Australia, 2GB)
- July 18 – Lou Dobbs, 78, American talk radio host
- July 22 – Mark Carnevale, 64, American professional golfer and broadcaster (Sirius XM PGA Tour Radio)
- August 14 – John Lansing, 67, American journalist, CEO of NPR (2019–2024)
- August 15 – Peter Marshall, 98, American entertainer (host on Music of Your Life)
- August 20 – CJ Rivera, 44, Filipino radio host (DWTM)
- September 21 – Al McCoy, 91, American sportscaster (Phoenix Suns)
- October 5 – Doc Harris, 76, Canadian radio personality
- October 10 – J. J. Jeffrey, 84, American disc jockey and station group owner (Fuller-Jeffrey Broadcasting).
- October 12 – Wanda Smith, 58, American radio host (WVEE)
- October 25 – Jim Donovan, 68, American radio sportscaster (Cleveland Browns Radio Network)
- October 31 – Candy Devine, 85, Australian broadcaster and singer on Northern Ireland's Downtown Radio
- November 1 – Kulada Kumar Bhattacharya, 91, Indian radio performer and actor
- November 8 – June Spencer, 105, English actress best known for The Archers
- November 21 – Alice Brock, 83, American artist and restaurateur. "Alice's Restaurant," named after her, is a Thanksgiving radio tradition, to which she recorded personal introductions in 2022.
- November 24 – Chuck Woolery, 83, American conservative talk radio commentator (Save Us Chuck Woolery), singer and television personality.
- December 2 – Paul van Gelder, 77, Dutch radio disc jockey
- December 14 – Hilaron "Larry" Henares, 100, Filipino veteran journalist and host of "Make My Day".
- December 17
  - Marcel Marnat, 91, French musicologist, journalist, and radio producer (France Musique)
  - Jimmy Morato, 78, Filipino actor and journalist.
- December 27 – Greg Gumbel, 78, American radio and television sportscaster (the original WFAN)

== See also ==
- 2024 in British radio
