= 2026 in radio =

The following is a list of events affecting radio broadcasting in 2026. Events listed include radio program debuts, finales, cancellations, station launches, closures, and format changes, as well as information about controversies and deaths of radio personalities.

== Notable events ==
=== January ===
Date	Event	Source
2	Dutch DJ Tiësto launches his new weekly trance radio show, Prismatic, replacing his previous EDM weekly show Club Life.	
5	The Corporation for Public Broadcasting, which provided federal subsidies to public broadcasting stations in the United States, dissolves after it was defunded in a rescissions act which was signed into law the previous year.	
31	Citing a loss in revenue due to the Corporation for Public Broadcasting's dissolution and a decline in Canadian donations caused by international tensions, WNED-FM in Buffalo, New York, which had operated as a non-commercial classical music station for the previous 50 years, reverts its license to commercial operation and begins investing on commercial advertising. The station later announces its intention to move its programming to non-commercial licensed station WBFO, which retains select NPR shows due to contractual obligations, in May. WNED-FM will shift to a commercially supported format with news, sports and other content in August.	

=== February ===
Date	Event	Source
3	The Buffalo Bills Radio Network in the U.S. announces the end of its fourteen-year relationship with Audacy and announces that Good Karma Brands would assume control over affiliate relations starting in the 2026 Buffalo Bills season, with an intended target to expand its network throughout the United States; in Canada, TSN Radio assumed distribution of the network. As Good Karma does not own a station in Buffalo, the Buffalo Bills would sign an affiliation agreement with Cumulus Media to return Bills games to former flagship WGRF in May.	
9–March 10	DWSS-AM and DWBL-AM suspends broadcasting for a month, from midnight of February 9, 2026, until March 10, 2026, as the station upgraded its transmitter to improve its coverage, while its cable channel counterpart, Abante TV and online livestream remain available.	
17–22	WGR in Buffalo, New York, expands its programming into a regional network with the introduction of simulcasts of its programming along with the WGR brand on WLKK in rural Wyoming County (which changes its call sign to WGR-FM) and WROC in Rochester. The move comes as part of a wider strategy by owner Audacy to have FM simulcasts in a majority of major markets where it operates AM sports stations and counteract the loss of its Bills rights; it successfully retained rights to the Sabres Hockey Network that summer after that contract also came up for renewal (see February 3 entry).	
17	Radio Free Asia resumes its broadcast operations to China after being suspended for almost a year as a result of the reduction of its parent agency, the United States Agency for Global Media.	
18	The Intervision 2026 song competition is announced to be held in Saudi Arabia.	

=== March ===
Date	Event	Source
13	iHeartMedia launches a new iteration of TikTok Radio in partnership with TikTok as part a new agreement that began at the end of 2025, replacing a previous agreement TikTok had with SiriusXM that ended in November 2025. In addition to airing on iHeart's digital platforms, the station is also broadcast on the HD subchannels of various iHeart radio stations in major cities.	

=== April ===
Date	Event	Source
30	Alex Jones suspends his Infowars broadcast amid acquisition attempts by satirical news site The Onion.	

=== May ===
Date	Event	Source
22	CBS News Radio shuts down after 99 years of operations. The network was the last remnant of the CBS Radio Network, which was founded in 1927. The network itself had been divested to Audacy by the time of its closure, with CBS News having continued to produce its content.	
27	NPR announces it had fired 28 news staffers in an attempt to reorganize the newsroom and deal with funding reductions. NPR correspondents Don Gonyea (national politics), Joe Shapiro (investigations), and Nell Greenfieldboyce (science) independently confirmed that they were among those whose roles at the network were eliminated.	

=== June ===
Date	Event	Source
24	Ryman Hospitality Properties announces its intent to place its radio and entertainment properties, including radio station WSM, its performance venues including the Ryman Auditorium and Grand Ole Opry House, and its majority stake in the Grand Ole Opry radio program, up for sale.	
26	iHeartMedia begins eliminating numerous on-air positions across all of its stations, in several cases eliminating the last local talent in their respective metropolitan areas. The eliminations was estimated to be the worst in radio history.	

=== July ===
Date	Event	Source
7	Canada's Rogers Sports & Media shuts down six radio stations: CKWX–Vancouver, CISL–Richmond, CFFR–Calgary, CFAC–Calgary, CJNI–Halifax, and CKGL–Kitchener.	

=== August ===
Date	Event	Source
31	Zollener Media Group switches the frequencies of KRMG-FM and KRAV-FM in Tulsa, Oklahoma. KRMG switched from 102.3 to 96.5, while KRAV moved to 102.3 FM.	

=== September ===
Date	Event	Source
1	SiriusXM Radio launches a major realignment to its channel lineup. Various local sports radio simulcasts owned by Good Karma and Audacy joined the service's lineup, while Howard 101, the secondary channel operated by Howard Stern, is discontinued following The Howard Stern Show's reduced live schedule with its content moving to sister channel Howard 100. Several of the service's spoken word and international channels were reassigned to new channel numbers with the realignment.	
18	The American newsmagazine America in The Morning ends its 42-year run. The magazine, which was one of the last surviving remnants of the Mutual Broadcasting System and had merged with its NBC counterpart First Light in 2022, was cancelled due to Dan Bongino's return to radio after a nearly two-year absence.	
28	KLO-FM in the Salt Lake City area becomes the first station in North America to adopt the all-Christmas music format for the 2026 season. Unlike 2025, when the station adopted a first-in-the-nation format change in mid-October as a stunt in-between regular formats, KLO-FM will return to its adult contemporary format in 2027, stating that tight competition in the Salt Lake metropolitan area and the success of the 2025 stunt prompted them to repeat its early Christmas flip. It is the second-earliest changeover to the all-Christmas format on record, trailing only the September 25, 2020 launch of WWIZ's all-Christmas format.	
29	Pamal Broadcasting announces the acquisition of the radio assets of Galaxy Media Partners, consolidating the two upstate New York broadcasting companies as Galaxy founder Ed Levine retires.	

=== October ===
Date	Event	Source
2	Connoisseur Media announces it will sell the frequency of WQCM 94.3 FM in Hagerstown, Maryland to Christian broadcaster Family Life Ministries.	

=== November ===
Date	Event	Source
14	The Eurovision Song Contest Asia Grand Final will take place in Bangkok, Thailand.	
17	Audacy announces the closure of the Texas State Network, with the exception of the four major league sports radio networks under its umbrella.	

== Deaths ==
- dJanuary 4: Michael Reagan, 80, American conservative talk radio host
- January 7: Raffaella Bragazzi, 66, Italian television presenter and radio host
- January 13: Brian Wilshire, 81, Australian radio host
- January 14: Ado Schlier, 90, German radio personality
- February 17: Jesse Jackson, 84, American talk radio host (Keep Hope Alive) and civil rights activist
- February 21: Koos Postema, 93, Dutch radio and television presenter
- February 25: Fahmy Omar, 97, Egyptian broadcaster, served as president of Egyptian Radio from 1982 to 1988
- March 11: Ernie Anastos, 82, American broadcaster and radio station owner
- March 16: Orion Samuelson, 91, American farm broadcaster and last host of the National Barn Dance
- April 13: Dave McGinnis, 74, former NFL head coach (Arizona Cardinals) and radio analyst for the Tennessee Titans Radio Network
- April 16: Don Schlitz, 73, American songwriter and Grand Ole Opry member
- April 17: Bob Kevoian, 75, American morning radio host (The Bob & Tom Show)
- April 25: Roderick "Braggy" Braganza, 57, Filipino radio jock and station manager (DWQZ 97.9 Home Radio)
- May 4: John Sterling, 87, American sportscaster (New York Yankees Radio Network)
- May 6: Ted Turner, 87, American businessman and founder of the Headline News television channel was formerly simulcast on radio
- June 3: Rocky Allen, 71, American radio host (Rocky Allen Showgram on various local stations across the United States)
- June 9: Bill Cody, 68, American radio host (WSM, Pure American Country in syndication)
- June 11: Margaret Kerry, 97, American entertainer (KKLA-FM)
- June 12: Gene Shalit, 100, American critic (Man About Anything for NBC Radio Network)
- July 2: Tommy Hunter, 89, Canadian country musician and radio and television host (CBC Radio)
- August 15: Tommy John, 83, American baseball pitcher and radio/television commentator
- August 18: Bill Rasmussen, 93, American broadcaster (founder of Enterprise Radio Network)
- August 25: Dolly Parton, 80, American singer/songwriter and Grand Ole Opry member
- August 26: Peter Cullen, 85, Canadian announcer and voice actor (CKGM)
- August 27: Jacques Doucet, 86, Canadian sportscaster most famous for his work with the Montreal Expos
- September 27:
  - Martin Oliver "Martin D" Dipasupil, 56, Filipino disc jockey (MOR 101.9)
  - Sam Costanilla, 68, Filipino radio news presenter and station manager (DYCM Cebu)
- September 28: Nicole Taylor, 35, American country singer (Taylor Red) and radio host (Taste of Country Mornings)
- October 16: Noah Adams, 84, American NPR journalist and host of All Things Considered
- November 10: Stacy Keach, 85, American/Polish actor and host of The Twilight Zone Radio Dramas
- November 14: Richard Sterban, 83, American country/gospel singer (Stamps Quartet, The Oak Ridge Boys) and Grand Ole Opry member
