= Abante (disambiguation) =

Abante is a Filipino tabloid newspaper.

Abante may also refer to:

- Abante TV, a Philippine news television channel
- DWSS-AM, a Philippine radio station broadcasting as Abante
- Benny Abante (born 1951), Filipino politician
- 3480 Abante, a main-belt asteroid

== See also ==
- Abantes, an ancient Ionian tribe
- Abante Mindanao, a Philippine political party
- Abante Vizcaya, a Philippine political party
