= Abante News TV =

Philippine news television channel

- Country: Philippines
- Broadcast area: Nationwide (via cable and satellite); Worldwide (Online)
- Affiliates: Abante
- Headquarters: 60 P. Tuazon Boulevard, Barangay Bagong Lipunan ng Crame, Cubao, Quezon City, Philippines

Programming
- Language: Tagalog
- Picture format: 720p/1080i HDTV (downscaled to 16:9 480i for the SDTV feed)

Ownership
- Owner: Abante-Bilyonaryo Group
- Sister channels: Bilyonaryo News Channel; Abante; Mellow 94.7 BFM

History
- Launched: October 2024; 2 years ago
- Replaced: O Shopping (Cignal channel space); CLTV36 HD (SatLite channel numbering space); Sari-Sari Channel (SatLite channel space)

Links
- Website: www.abante.com.ph

Availability

Terrestrial
- Sky Cable (Metro Manila): Channel 85
- Cablelink (Metro Manila, Bulacan, Tarlac, Cavite, Laguna): Channel 103
- Sky Direct (Nationwide): Channel 40
- Sky TV (Nationwide): Channel 40
- Cignal TV (Nationwide): Channel 30
- SatLite (Nationwide): Channel 30

Streaming media
- Blast TV: Internet Protocol television (Philippines only; requires monthly subscription)
- Samsung TV Plus: Internet Protocol television (Philippines only)
- TCLtv+: Internet Protocol television (Philippines only)
- Other affiliated streaming services: Amasian TV (North America only)

Abante News TV (formerly Abante TeleTabloid) is a Philippine pay television news channel owned by the Abante-Bilyonaryo Group (Prage Management Corporation). The channel's programming is mainly composed of a "teleradyo" video simulcast from its sister station Abante (1494 kHz) and its own original shows.

Abante News TV (along with Bilyonaryo News Channel) is distributed by Tap Digital Media Ventures.

== History ==
Prior to the launch, in 2019, Abante launched its own "teleradyo" digital platform Abante Radyo Tabloidista. It was available via internet radio and YouTube.

On October 10, 2022, Abante launched an online morning newscast called Abante TeleTabloid, and public service show, I-Abante Mo!, both shown on the tabloid's social media accounts.

In October 2024, prior to establishment of Abante Radyo in July of the same year that spiritually replaced Radyo Tabloidista, Abante TeleTabloid launched as a 24-hour linear channel and can be viewed on SkyCable Channel 85, Cablelink Channel 103, Sky Direct and Sky TV Channel 40, Cignal TV and SatLite Channel 30, Samsung TV Plus on Samsung Smart TVs, TCL Smart TVs, Blast TV, and on social media accounts such as YouTube, Facebook, and TikTok. On 2025, the channel renamed as Abante TV, reflecting the teleradyo simulcast of programs in Abante Radyo.

== Programming ==
=== News ===
- Abante Express (hourly news update; 2025)
- Abante Pilipinas (2024–26, 2026)
- Abante Pilipinas Weekend sa Umaga (2026)
- Abante Pilipinas Weekend sa Tanghali (2026)
- Agenda (2024)
  - Agenda Weekend (2024)
- Metro Morning (2026)
- Politiko Nightly (2025)

=== News commentary and current affairs ===
- For the Record (2025)
- Kasangga Mo ang Langit (2025)
- FYI (2025)
- Memo with Korina (2026)
- On Point with Pinky Webb (2026)
- The Commanders (2026)
- Point of Order (2025)
- Walang Atrasan (2024)
- Hoy Listen (2026)

=== Infotainment, Lifestyle, Magazine and talk ===
- Intimatalk (2026)
- Jigo Live! (2024)
- Tamang Kwentuhan (2024)
- TeleBabe (2025)
- Pera Talks (2025)
- Riding Tandem (2026)

=== Public Service ===
- Tulong Abante (2025)
- OFW Konek (2026)

=== Religious ===
- Misa sa Abante (2026)

=== Showbiz ===
- Abantelliling (2025)
- Ah-Eh-Minin (2025)
- Marisol Academy (2024)
  - Marisol Academy Tonite (2024)
- Showbiz Pulis (2025)
- Show Best (2025)

=== Sports ===
- Sports Now (2024)
  - Sports Now Weekend (2026)
- Sportalakan (2025)
- Basketbolan Noon at Ngayon (2026)
- Net Flicks (2026)
- Sports Ambush (2026)

=== Comedy ===
- Panciteria Aroma (2026)

=== Previously aired ===
- #KOOL 2 (2024–25)
- Abante sa Umaga (2025)
  - Abante sa Umaga Weekend (2025)
- Abante sa Tanghali (2025)
  - Abante sa Tanghali Weekend (2025)
- Abante Pilipinas (2024)
  - Abante Pilipinas Weekend (2025)
- AbanTECH at Negosyo (2025)
- Ako Bicol sa Abante Radyo (2025)
- Abante Radyo Balita Buong Bansa (2024–25)
  - Abante Radyo Balita Buong Bansa Weekend (2024–25)
- Abante Radyo Balita Quickie (2024–25)
- Abante Radyo Balita Weekend (2025)
- ABA TRENDiNG! (2024–25)
- Aksyon Abante (2024–25)
- Agri Abante (2025)
- Anything Goes (2024–25)
- Armas Batas (2024–25)
- Bardagulan sa Radyo (2024–25)
- Chikadoras (2024–25)
- Cong Radyo (2025)
- DOKtor is IN (2024)
- Easy Lang (2024–25)
- Inbox (2025)
- Keep the Faith: Daily Mass with the Jesuits (produced by Jesuit Communications Foundation, 2024–25)
- Kiddie Patrol (2024)
- Kwentong Politiko (2024)
- Long Table (2025)
- Lusob Probinsya (2024–25)
- Lusob Probinsya Weekend (2024–25)
- Mahiwagang Mundo ng Politiko (2024–25)
- OOTD: Opinyon Of The Day (2025)
- Parekoy (2024)
- Politiko Nightly (2025–26)
- Politiskoop (2024–25)
- Reklamo, I-Abante Mo (2025)
- Roadside (2025)
- Saktong Tapatan (2025)
- Serbisyo Publiko sa Abante Radyo (2025)
- Sexy Time (2024–25)
- Showbiz Overtime! (2025)
- Tatak Rod Navarro (2024)
- Usapang Lasing (2024–25)
- Walang Atrasan Tonite (2024)

== Notable on-air personalities ==
- Rey Langit
- Korina Sanchez
- Pinky Webb
- Jerry Codinera
- Gerry Esplana

== See also ==
- Aliw Channel 23
- DWAN 1206 TV
- DZMM TeleRadyo
- DZRH News Television
- DZME RadyoTV
- Inquirer 990 Television
- PRTV Prime Media
- Radyo Bandido TV
- GMA News TV (defunct)
- One PH
