= DWSS-AM =

Radio station in Metro Manila, Philippines

Abante News TV (DWSS)
- Quezon City; Philippines
- Broadcast area: Metro Manila and surrounding areas
- Frequency: 1494 kHz
- Branding: Abante News TV

Programming
- Language: Filipino
- Format: News, Public Affairs, Talk
- Affiliations: Abante News TV; Bilyonaryo News Channel; K5 News FM; Radyo Trumpeta

Ownership
- Owner: FBS Radio Network; (Supreme Broadcasting System)
- Operator: Abante-Bilyonaryo Group
- Sister stations: Through FBS: DWBL; Through Prage: Mellow 94.7 BFM

History
- First air date: 1975
- Former call signs: DWEE/DWWO (1975–1978); DWXY (1978–1980); DWCJ (1980–1988); DWLR (1988–1993)
- Former names: K-Love (1993–1996)
- Former frequencies: 1380 kHz (1975–1978)
- Call sign meaning: Sandigan ng Sambayanan (former branding)

Technical information
- Licensing authority: NTC
- Class: B (Regional)
- Power: 10,000 watts

Links
- Webcast: Abante News TV Facebook Page; Abante News TV on YouTube
- Website: Abante News TV

DWSS (1494 AM), broadcasting as Abante News TV, is a radio station owned by Supreme Broadcasting System and operated by Abante-Bilyonaryo Group (Prage Management Corporation). The station's studio is located at 60 P. Tuazon Boulevard, Barangay Bagong Lipunan, Cubao, Quezon City, while its transmitter is located along Coloong 1 Road, Barangay Coloong, Valenzuela, Metro Manila.

Several programs are also shown on Abante News TV channel on SkyCable Channel 85, Sky TV Channel 40, Cablelink Channel 103, Cignal Channel 30, Samsung TV Plus, TCL Smart TVs and through selected K5 News FM stations in the Philippines, Radyo Trumpeta 95.7 Cagayan de Oro, Blast TV, kAPPitbahay app, Amasian TV (for North America) and on its digital streaming channel Abante News TV / DWAR Abante Radyo on YouTube, Facebook, and TikTok.

== Profile ==
The station was established by Masscom Network of the National Council of Churches in the Philippines in 1975 as DWEE. Back then, it was situated on 1380 kHz. In November 1978, it transferred to 1494 kHz due to the adoption of the 9-kHz spacing for medium wave stations per the Geneva Frequency Plan of 1975 (aka GE75), and changed its call letters to DWXY. Sometime in 1980, it was acquired by RADIO Inc. (Radio Corporation of the Philippines) and changed its call letters to DWCJ. The station was located at the now Philippine Christian University campus in Taft Avenue, Malate, Manila. The station then aired the programs similar to the past KZKZ.

In 1988, Ultrasonic Broadcasting System bought the station and changed its call letters to DWLR. It relocated to SYSU Building in Quezon City, Metro Manila. In 1993, it changed its call letters to DWSS and switched to airing Christian music under the name 1494 K-LOVE. Considering the owner's strong family religious background, this was their 1st venture into religious programming way before launching Saved Radio on Energy FM in the 2000s. In 1996, Manny Luzon took over the station's operations and revamped DWSS as a blocktime station with the tagline Sandigan ng Sambayanan.

Former logo of DWSS.

In 2004, DWSS was sold to FBS Radio Network in exchange of the latter's stations in Dagupan and Cebu. Due to ownership restrictions, its license was assigned to FBS subsidiary Supreme Broadcasting System. Following the trade's consummation, the station transferred to Paragon Plaza in Mandaluyong. It was once home of Nar Pineda, Ducky Paredes, Ruben Ilagan and other Powerhouse Broadcasters since the demise of the old DZXQ (now Radyo La Verdad) in March 2011, as well as the Tagalog-language broadcast of Family Radio during evenings.

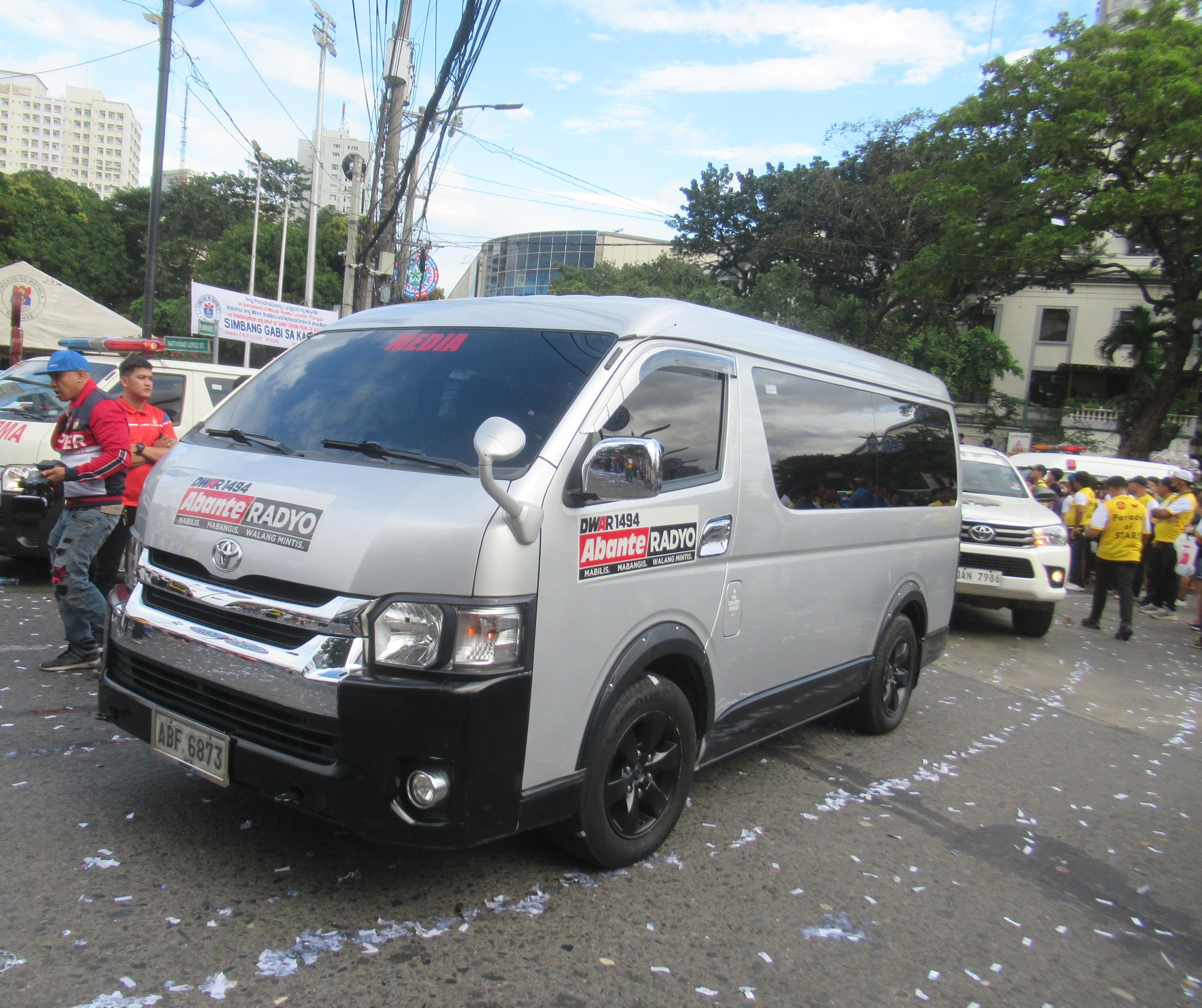
DWSS vehicle, Padre Burgos Avenue

In March 2020, at the height of the pandemic, DWSS went off the air. A couple of months later, most of its programs transferred to DWBL.

In May 2024, Prage Management Corporation, owner of tabloid newspaper Abante, took over the station's operations. On July 8, 2024, it went on the air on test broadcast as Abante Radyo. It serves as the terrestrial extension of Abante Teletabloid, the paper's digital news service which was launched in 2022. In mid-2025, it was renamed as Abante, and later as Abante News TV after Prage's flagship newspaper to reflect on the radio station's growing presence on cable TV, streaming and social media; though it still occasionally uses its Abante Radyo branding in selected promotions.

Since August 15, 2025, some programs of Abante, along with Bilyonaryo News Channel's flagship newscast Agenda, began airing on selected K5 News FM provincial stations after inking a partnership agreement with the network's operator 5K Broadcasting Network.

From February 10 to March 15, 2026, DWSS and its sister station DWBL went off the air to make way for transmitter upgrades. Cable and online streaming remained unaffected.

== Notable on-air personalities ==
- Jerry Codinera
- Onchie dela Cruz
- Gerry Esplana
- Ambet Nabus
- Rey Langit
- Long Meija
- Rufa Mae Quinto
- Jeric Raval
- Bea Santiago
- Korina Sanchez
- Pinky Webb

== See also ==
- Abante
- Bilyonaryo News Channel
- Politiko
- Bilyonaryo
