= Far East Network =

Network of US military broadcast stations in Asia

- Type: Network of American military radio and television stations
- Branding: FEN
- Availability: U.S. Forces in Japan, Okinawa, the Philippines, and Guam
- Headquarters: Yokota Air Base
- Launch date: May 1942; 84 years ago
- Dissolved: 1991; 35 years ago
- Former names: American Forces Network-Japan

The Far East Network (FEN) was a network of radio and television stations operated by the Military of the United States, primarily serving U.S. Forces in Japan, Okinawa, the Philippines, and Guam. The FEN was active between 1942 and 1991 and broadcast news and other original media, alongside re-broadcasts of motion pictures and other content.

== Overview ==
Now known as the American Forces Network-Japan (AFN-Japan), with the disestablishment in 1997 of the Far East Network, this network provides military members, Department of Defense civilian employees, and State Department diplomatic personnel and their families with news, information and entertainment by over-the-air radio and TV, and by base cable television.

In addition to its primary military and authorized U.S. civilian audience, AFN-Japan also has a "shadow audience" of an estimated 1.2 million non-military listeners; mostly Japanese studying English, and other English-speaking foreign nationals residing in Japan.

AFN-Japan is headquartered at Yokota Air Base, a major U.S. Air Force installation on the outskirts of Tokyo, and is also known as "AFN-Tokyo".

The network has affiliates located at Misawa Air Base (AFN-Misawa), Marine Corps Air Station Iwakuni (AFN-Iwakuni), and Fleet Activities Sasebo (AFN-Sasebo). While not operationally part of what was once FEN - US Air Force personnel assigned to the Army Network in Korea (AFKN) were under partial administrative control of the FEN Network Headquarters.

Also part of AFN-Japan is AFN-Okinawa, located in the Rycom Plaza Housing Area adjacent to Marine Corps Base Camp S.D. Butler.

AFN-Tokyo is also a Regional News Center, collecting news stories from all Pacific military public affairs offices and AFN affiliates, and packages them into the regional newscast, Pacific Report.

The Pacific Report can be seen every weekday throughout the Pacific and around the world on the AFN-Pacific digital satellite feed and on the Pentagon Channel.

In the Philippines, FEN Philippines was broadcast on UHF Channel 17 (from 1955 until 1981, FEN operated on Channel 8) in Pampanga and Zambales (as in Subic and Clark bases), and UHF Channel 34 in San Miguel, Bulacan (ABS-CBN Corporation occupied the latter frequency until 2020, due to the network's franchise expiration; the Channel 34 frequency is now used by Advanced Media Broadcasting System to broadcast All TV in digital TV) and also on UHF Channel 50 in Metro Manila. Its radio stations DWFE-AM in Olongapo and DWFA-AM in Balanga, Bataan, and Far East 95.1 (now RW 95.1) on FM are as a part of their network's operations from 1946 to 1991 but the TV channel was forcibly shut down due to the eruption of Mount Pinatubo and the withdrawal of the U.S. military from Clark. Regular and live broadcasts in Clark ended after June 15, 1991, with 'Bill & Ted’s Excellent Adventure' and 'Tiny Toon Adventures' being the last TV shows aired. After that, FEN Clark became a relay station for FEN Subic because of the damage to its studio in Clark. The last known broadcast aired in Clark was the song 'God Bless the USA' on September 15, 1991, while broadcasting continued in FEN Subic until November 1992.

In May 1942 the Armed Forces Radio Service (AFRS), was established on the Alaskan island of Kodiak. Radio broadcasts were used to provide information to members of the American armed forces serving off of the U.S. mainland. Evolving from the Morale Services Division of the War Department, the new American Forces Radio Service (AFRS) also included a combination of such activities as command troop information programs, local command news, information broadcasts and morale-building transmissions. By late 1942, the new AFRS had begun receiving direct support from both the Army and the Navy with the assignment of personnel tasked with producing special radio programs. In 1943, a complex of high-powered radio transmitters was organized to transmit programs to military men and women serving in Europe, Alaska, and the South Pacific.

When AFRS broadcasts were transmitted in the Pacific, they were done so under two different commands. Outlets in the Southwest Pacific were operated under Army General Douglas MacArthur; those in the Central Pacific, under Navy Admiral Chester Nimitz. By July 1943, AFRS had set up two stations in the Southwest Pacific (SWP) Region, operating a small station in New Georgia. The following month, a similar mobile station began broadcasting near Vella Lavella.

The first AFRS stations established under the Central Pacific Command were set up on the Tarawa Atoll and islet of Makin, both located in the Gilbert Islands, in November 1943. Three more stations, on Kwajalein and Eniwetok in the Marshall Islands and one on Guadalcanal in the Solomon Islands, went on the air in February 1944. Teams of military broadcast specialists were trained at AFRS' headquarters in Los Angeles to operate radio stations. Later, they traveled to Hawaii, where they picked up equipment and briefed on their assignment and local conditions, and then proceeded to their posts by whatever means they were able to travel. Some of the teams carried complete radio transmitting equipment: 50-watt transmitters, turntables, a tiny mixing console and several boxes of records. A few teams were provided with short-wave receivers so they could monitor AFRS newscasts from San Francisco. Each team usually consisted of an officer and five or six enlisted men. Upon reaching its destination, a team operated by whatever means they could. Electrical generators were often hard to acquire, and a station often had to provide its own independent power source. In the Central Pacific, once a station had been set up and broadcasting, locally based servicemen were trained to operate the outlet. Usually, after the team was sure that the station could be run by the local GIs, they returned to Honolulu for reassignment to another location. This connected conglomerate of military stations became known as the Pacific Ocean Network (PON).

== Late World War II ==
By late spring of 1944, the island-hopping campaigns of the war had made household words out of the names of previously little-known islands in the Central and South Pacific. The hard-fought battles in each area as the Allies moved northward introduced many famous battlegrounds. AFRS stations were set up on most of them, including Bougainville and New Britain (Solomon Islands—March 1944), New Guinea, New Ireland, Kavieng, and the Admiralty Islands (April 1944) and Rabaul (May 1944). These were all under Gen. MacArthur's Southwest Pacific Command, and at various times were referred to as the "Jungle Network" or the "Mosquito Network."

AFRS team personnel received mixed receptions from the various island commanders. Drawn from whatever dominant branch of service on any particular island, some island commanders were very high on the broadcast idea, and gave support wherever they could. Others were less receptive, and there were times when the problems AFRS teams confronted had to be "bumped up" to the next higher echelon of command.

Though there were untold numbers and types of problems facing the generals and admirals in the war theater, the largest single problem was how to boost and keep up the morale of the hundreds of thousands of servicemen under their command. The delivery of mail from home was sporadic, at best, and often took several weeks or months to reach its destination.

Though it was not long after the establishment of AFRS, commanders began to realize that AFRS was probably the greatest morale booster ever devised, especially if the radio stations provided entertainment as well as news from home. So, even the threat of reporting AFRS problems to a higher headquarters often resulted in quick action by local commanders to do whatever they could to solve them.

Still, some AFRS teams experienced problems that could not be easily solved by local island commanders, and the teams resorted to other methods of getting the job done. Several Pacific Ocean Network stations acquired high-powered transmitters, up to 200 watts in strength, through requisitioning procedures. A few obtained theirs through what came to be known as "midnight requisitions," or simply absconding with them from various sources. There were times when pieces of captured equipment were modified and used.

During the summer and early autumn of 1944, the Pacific Ocean Network added several other stations to its chain, including those on Saipan and Guam (Mariana Islands in July and August 1944), and on Peleliu and Ulithi (Caroline Islands in September 1944). The station on Ulithi sometimes operated up to nineteen hours a day to serve the gigantic fleets anchored nearby.

As the island hopping toward Japan continued, AFRS became more and more popular among the troops. The term "island hopping" is often used to describe the way in which Allied forces advanced toward Japan, mainly because many Japanese-held islands were literally bypassed, or hopped over. Some were neither captured nor occupied by Allied forces until after the official Japanese surrender.

When the Allies eventually took control of the islands, there was little resistance at many of them, thanks to AFRS broadcasts. Several AFRS outlets, such as the station on Peleliu, beamed special broadcasts in Japanese to the Imperial troops remaining. Japanese-Americans made these broadcasts.

Leaflets, dropped by patrol planes flying over the islands, alerted the Japanese forces there as to when the special broadcasts would be made. Japanese music was sometimes included in the broadcasts to get their attention. It was only after the surrender of the islands months later that captured documents revealed the tremendous successes of the broadcasts in convincing the Japanese commanders that their war efforts were futile.

== Maintaining the signal ==
The broadcasters and maintenance men who set up and operated the mobile stations experienced extreme hardships. In some cases, personnel, equipment, food and weapons were dropped by parachutes or delivered by PT boats. Some were brought to new sites by light planes, which landed on dirt strips, laboriously hacked out of rain forests.

Other hazards in the tropics were jungle swamps, unbridged rivers and streams, and patches of mud into which men sank to their waists. The climate was hot and humid and frequent rainstorms made the atmosphere oppressive. Malaria-carrying mosquitoes were everywhere.

On the larger, foliage-blanketed islands, from which outcrops of rocky mountains extended above the jungles, there was an ever-present, all-pervading scent of rotting vegetation that made breathing miserable. Except for the sounds of exploding bombs and artillery shells, the stillness was so profound that an occasional harsh cry from a startled bird seemed to be sinister and awe-inspiring.

Keeping equipment in operating order was difficult. Drifting clouds that wreathed the treetops in swirling mists fed the dense canopy of dripping foliage far above the ever-saturated and almost sunless floor of the primeval jungle.

Even though the transmitters were set up under tents, they often experienced problems with short-circuiting caused by the moisture that constantly surrounded them. Back-up units were not always available, which meant that often transmitters had to be "jury-rigged" in order to get anything out of them. The hot and humid air also warped the discs/records containing the recorded programming.

== End of hostilities ==
On May 8, 1945, word was received via radio from Delhi, announcing the end of hostilities in Europe.

AFRS stations broadcast from the islands of New Guinea, Java, and Borneo in the Dutch East Indies as the Allies moved into the Gilbert Islands and Bismarck Archipelago to the east. Coast watchers and scouts also listened to the AFRS stations for information about what was happening. Coded messages were sometimes included in daily broadcasts to give them special information as well.

As the Allies drew closer to Japan, the fighting turned into a desperate island-by-island struggle. Command of the airwaves over areas changed hands as much as twice weekly, and in a few instances, twice daily. That made it even more difficult for those manning the AFRS radio stations, because, if they got too close to the battlefronts, aerial bombing could destroy the stations. On more than one occasion the operators did not have time to transport their equipment away from contested areas, and had to abandon the stations where they were.

As the war front drew closer to Japan's four main islands, another AFRS outlet was established, on the island of Okinawa, in July 1945.

== Post-war ==
Ten days after the formal surrender ceremonies aboard the battleship USS Missouri in Tokyo Bay, the first AFRS station in Japan went on the air, signing-on with the phrase, "This is Armed Forces Radio Service, Station W-V-T-R in Tokyo." The date was September 12, 1945.

The Nippon Hoso Kyokai (NHK) building in Tokyo was the home to station JOAK, and shared its facilities with WVTR from 1945 to 1952. With the consolidation of all the AFRS outlets under the newly established Supreme Commander Allied Powers (SCAP), the fledgling Far East Network had eighteen stations in Japan broadcasting daily to troops ashore and afloat.

== DWFE-AM ==
DWFE-AM
- Olongapo; Philippines
- Broadcast area: Zambales
- Frequency: 1512 kHz
- Branding: FEN Armed Forces Radio

Ownership
- Owner: FEN Philippines

History
- First air date: 1950
- Last air date: 1991
- Call sign meaning: FE for Far East

Technical information
- Power: 5,000 watts

DWFE-AM (1512 kHz Olongapo) was an AM radio station of FEN Philippines in the Philippines. The station's studio and transmitter were located Rizal Ave., Olongapo, Zambales. As of today, the 1512 kHz were reused this time in Lucena under DZAT.

=== FEN Philippines AM Stations ===
- DWFE AM 1512 - Olongapo
- DWFA AM 1251 - Balanga
