= CLTV =

CLTV may also refer to:

- Central Luzon Television, a Philippine television channel
- Chicagoland Television, a former Chicago-area regional news channel initialized in branding as CLTV
- Customer lifetime value
- Combined loan to value
