= DXBL =

Radio station in Cagayan de Oro, Philippines

Radyo Trumpeta CDO (DXBL)
- Cagayan de Oro; Philippines
- Broadcast area: Misamis Oriental, parts of Lanao del Norte and Bukidnon
- Frequency: 95.7 MHz
- Branding: Radyo Trumpeta 95.7

Programming
- Languages: Cebuano, Filipino
- Format: Contemporary MOR, News, Talk
- Affiliations: Abante; Bilyonaryo News Channel

Ownership
- Owner: FBS Radio Network
- Operator: Shanne Manufacturing and Trading Corporation

History
- First air date: 1992
- Former names: Mellow Touch (1992-2026)
- Former frequencies: Radyo Trumpeta: 96.3 MHz (2024–2025)
- Call sign meaning: Bagong Lipunan

Technical information
- Licensing authority: NTC
- Power: 10,000 watts

DXBL (95.7 FM), broadcasting as Radyo Trumpeta 95.7 is a radio station owned by FBS Radio Network and operated by Shanne Manufacturing and Trading Corporation. The station's studio is located at Agora Road, Lapasan, Cagayan de Oro, and its transmitter is located along Camiguin St., Brgy. Macasandig, Cagayan de Oro (sharing transmitting site with Magnum Radyo 99.9).

== History ==
The station was an affiliate of Brigada News FM from 2012 to September 2014. In November 2023, new management took over the station and adopted the Radyo Lampornas branding. On April 1, 2026, it went off the air.

On April 9, 2026, the station returned on air, this time as Radyo Trumpeta under the management of Shanne Manufacturing and Trading Corporation, a company owned by former Buenavista, Agusan del Norte mayor Norbert Pagaspas which distributes Shanne Herb-Plus capsule. Radyo Trumpeta used to broadcast on 96.3 FM from August 14, 2024 to November 2025, when it migrated its operations online.

On May 5, 2026, Radyo Trumpeta began simulcasting Bilyonaryo News Channel's newscast Agenda.
