= DWLL =

Radio station in Metro Manila, Philippines

Mellow BFM (DWLL)
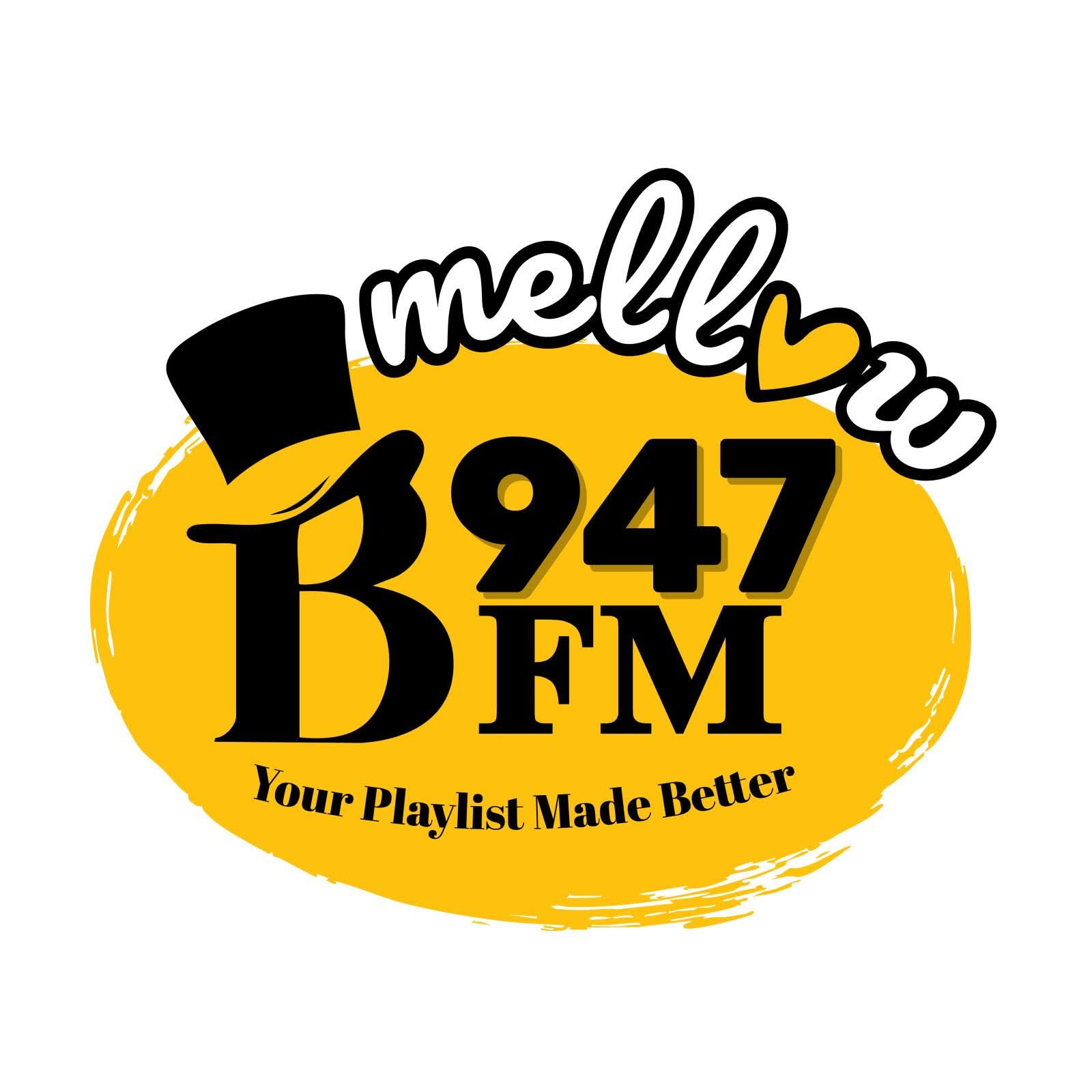
- Mandaluyong; Philippines
- Broadcast area: Mega Manila and surrounding areas
- Frequency: 94.7 MHz
- Branding: Mellow 947 BFM

Programming
- Language: English
- Format: Soft Adult Contemporary
- Affiliations: Bilyonaryo News Channel

Ownership
- Owner: FBS Radio Network
- Operator: Abante-Bilyonaryo Group
- Sister stations: DWBL; Through Prage: Abante

History
- First air date: February 23, 1973
- Call sign meaning: Luis and Leonida Vera (original owners)

Technical information
- Licensing authority: NTC
- Class: A/B/C
- Power: 25,000 watts
- ERP: 72,620 watts

Links
- Website: http://www.mellow947.com/

DWLL (94.7 FM), broadcasting as Mellow 947 BFM, is a radio station owned by FBS Radio Network and operated by Abante-Bilyonaryo Group (Prage Management Corporation). Its studio and transmitter are located in Unit 908, Paragon Plaza Building, EDSA cor. Reliance St., Mandaluyong.

== History ==
=== 1973–2006: Mellow Touch ===
The station began its broadcast in 1973 as WLL 94.7 or Mellow Touch 94.7. It is the Philippines' pioneering easy-listening radio station that only relied on spinners and a newscaster in its programming. While most radio stations' format at that time was predominantly strident, Mellow Touch capitalized on a "more music, less talk" programming strategy. This formula proved successful as other radio stations followed suit after the fact. It has, since, established itself as the station for relaxing and feel-good music. At that time, their studios were located at the now-demolished Philippine Communications Center building (PHILCOMCEN) in Pasig.

Former DWBL disc jockey Butch Gonzales provided pre-recorded voiceovers to bridge segues between songs and to serve the purpose of occasional time-checks, usually at the "Top" and "Bottom" of certain hours of each day. Gonzales' voice also became the Mellow Touch's signature, as he softly reminded the loyal listeners of tunes for "a walk in the park" or "a bike ride along the boulevard", every hour as the station ID and jingle played. The sound of his voice would gradually transition to “natural,” soft and sentimental music that was clearly associated with this FM station at the time. The station's top of the hour ID became one of the most recognizable radio anthems on Philippine FM radio. The jingle, with the lyrics, "You are the minstrel... and I your guitar...", was produced by Dallas-based TM Studios (formerly TM Productions). The lyrics from this radio branding image were specifically customized and altered to meet Mellow Touch's programming philosophy, called "The Mellow Sound". The jingle eventually became the station's most iconic trademark.

In November 1996, in a groundbreaking move, the station instituted a major reformat by accommodating on-air jocks. Scott Free (Drew Domingo), Harry Maze (Harry Corro), Ted Bear (Renan Baluyut), and Riz Taylor (Ariz Peter Fuentez), were the first deejays to go on board. Ruth Cabal (formerly of GMA News and CNN Philippines and now for News5) became one of its first lady newscasters, replacing long-time newscaster Ernie Fresnido. Despite the emergence of deejays in its programs, the station maintained its programming objective of "more music, less talk" to this day.

Among its most notable programs were Mellow Midweek, a Thursday special that featured the station's greatest love songs from the 70s, 80s, and 90s; and Straight from the Heart, a Sunday special that highlighted its classic easy listening staples from the 70s and 80s. These two specials, considered as benchmark classics, became famous for their original and characteristic style of playing songs consecutively (usually for an hour) that have the same theme or words in the title, thus evoking an interaction in between songs. Avid listeners call this signature style as "sagutan" in Filipino. Other noteworthy specials included Planet Soul, a Friday night program that played classic urban music from the 70s, 80s and 90s; Extreme, a Saturday night program that aired upbeat music from the 70s and 80s; and Afternoon Cruise, a weekday afternoon special that played acoustic music and featured live artists' performances.

In 1998, Mellow Touch transferred its studios from PHILCOMCEN Building in Pasig to the Paragon Plaza Building in Mandaluyong to share facilities with sister stations DWBL 1242, Magic 89.9, 99.5 RT (now 99.5 XFM) and 103.5 K-Lite (now All Radio 103.5).

=== 2006–2024: Mellow 947 ===
Mellow 94.7 logo from 2006 until 2024.

In mid-2006, the "Touch" was dropped from the branding, becoming Mellow 947 (pronounced as "ninety-four-seven"). It adopted an Adult Top 40 format, as well as a new slogan called "Sounds Good", as it continues its adherence to playing good music. Its programs now generally aim to bring out the mellow side of pop-alternative and light rock music fans.

Among its special programs were Sunday in Time, a Sunday program that featured songs from the 70s and 80s; Decade, a Thursday program that played songs from the 90s; Turn of the Century, a Sunday program that featured songs from the 2000s; and Nice & Slow, a Sunday night program that aired easy-listening music. Mellow also opened its doors to student DJs via the School of Jocks, which lasted until February 2020.

At the start of 2019, the 90s were added to its standard playlist, thus, expanding its format. Along with the reorganization of its programs, the station adopted another slogan, "All Hits", as it focuses on "less talk, less commercials and more music". On July 6, 2019, it also brought back Straight from the Heart, a weekend program that plays easy listening music from the 70s through the 90s, similar to the format used during the Mellow Touch era.

Mellow was among several FM radio stations in the Mega Manila that halted regular overnight broadcasts in 2020, amid lockdown measures caused by the COVID-19 pandemic; it never resumed 24-hour operations ever since. On November 18, it launched Mellow Midweek Special (frequently abbreviated as MMS, named after its old program), a Wednesday program that played upbeat music from the 70s through the 90s.

In 2021, it shifted back to its easy listening format. On October 13, 2022, it brought back its former station jingle "The Mellow Sound" as its top-of-the-hour ID.

In February 2023, Mellow 94.7 celebrated its 50th anniversary.

=== 2024–present: Mellow BFM ===
Mellow 94.7 BFM logo from 2024 until 2026.

On August 1, 2024, the station temporarily dropped the Mellow branding, only to be restored a month later as Mellow 94.7 BFM, (Note: Initials stand as Bilyonaryo FM.) with its initials bearing the slogan "Best Friend Mo" (a Taglish phrase for "Your Best Friend"). By this time, Prage Management Corporation, owner of Abante and Bilyonaryo News Channel and operator of Abante, took over the station's operations.

On November 18, 2024, Mellow began simulcasting Bilyonaryo News Channel's flagship Filipino language primetime newscast, Agenda, which is already being carried by Abante Radyo and its cable TV counterpart Abante TV.

In March 2025, the station's old transmitter was replaced with a new 25,000 watt transmitter bought from Broadcast Electronics (BE) for better signal reception in Metro Manila and nearby provinces.

On February 16, 2026, along with its new logo reveal, it adopted a new slogan "Your Playlist Made Better". It also began simulcasting Bilyonaryo News Channel's Shift Happens, Metro Mornings, Memo with Korina Sanchez-Roxas, and Sessions with Brian Yamsuan.
