= Ambet Nabus =

- Born: Edilberto Rivera Nabus; February 12, 1967 (age 59); Daet, Camarines Norte, Philippines
- Other name: Papa Ambetable
- Education: University of the Philippines Diliman
- Occupations: Radio Personality; Editor; Comedian; Film Publicist; Anchor; Vlogger
- Years active: 2005–present
- Known for: Showbiz Extra anchor (2005–2013); Talakan: Talakayan at Katinyawan anchor (2007–2011); Chismax anchor (2009–2020); Marites University host (2024–2025); Agenda anchor (2026–present); Sports Ambush anchor (2026–present)
- Children: Neeyong Nabus

YouTube information
- Channel: Ambetable Channel
- Years active: 2020–present
- Genres: vlogs, talk show
- Subscribers: 13.60 thousand
- Views: 759.32 thousand
- Last updated: July 14, 2022

Edilberto Rivera Nabus (Tagalog pronunciation: [ɾiˈbɛɾa ˈnɐbʊs]; born February 12, 1967), professionally known as Ambet Nabus, is a Filipino radio anchor, journalist, comedian, film publicist, editor, video blogger and a part-time actor.

== Education ==
Nabus graduated with a BA Communication (Broadcast Communication) degree from University of the Philippines Diliman in Quezon City in 1991.

== Career ==
Nabus started his career as a Publicist in PPL Building, United Nations Avenue, Ermita, City of Manila. He likes writing press releases and other promotional thrusts, media placement, monitoring media releases, media contacts coordination, and liaises special events/tasks (i.e. red carpet premieres. press junkets, etc.)

At DZMM, Nabus formerly anchored the former Saturday showbiz program Showbiz Extra, the former entertainment program Talakan or Talakayan at Katinyawan with Ahwel Paz, and Chismax: Chismis to the Max with Gretchen Fullido.

In September 2011, Nabus was the Editor-in-Chief in CMAS Philippines International Diving & Advocacy Magazine to print photos, do write-ups, write stories, etc.

In January 2015, Nabus worked as the Entertainment Editor in Kabayan Weekly, Dubai, United Arab Emirates.

On May 29, 2020, Nabus opened his official YouTube Channel.

On May 18, 2024, Nabus returned to television after a 4-year hiatus by hosting his newest program, Marites University, on ALLTV. He quietly left the show in 2025.

In June 2026, Nabus became an anchor of the primetime newscast, Agenda, on Bilyonaryo News Channel. 4 months later on September 27, he would make a comeback to terrestrial radio after 6 years on the radio sports program, Sports Ambush, on Abante News TV.

== Filmography ==
=== Movies ===
- Mano Po 5: Gua Ai Di (2006) - Reporter
- Desperadas (2007) - Alexis' class adviser
- Heavenly Touch (2009) - Client
- Ang Panday (2009) - Miling's son

=== Television ===
- Melason (2010) - Himself
- Marites University (2024–2025) - Himself/Host
- Agenda (2026–present) - Himself/Anchor

== Radio ==
- Showbiz Extra (2005–2013) - Himself/Anchor
- Talakan: Talakayan at Katinyawan (2007–2011) - Himself/Anchor
- Chismax: Chismis to the Max (2009–2020) - Himself/Anchor
- Sports Ambush (2026–present) - Himself/Anchor
