= DZLL =

Radio station in Baguio, Philippines

MemoRieS FM Baguio (DZLL)
- Baguio; Philippines
- Broadcast area: Benguet, La Union and surrounding areas
- Frequency: 107.1 MHz
- Branding: 107.1 MemoRieS FM

Programming
- Language: English
- Format: Classic Hits; OPM
- Network: MemoRieS FM

Ownership
- Owner: Primax Broadcasting Network

History
- First air date: 1992
- Former names: Mellow Touch (1992–1997); Smooth Jazz (1997); City Lite (1998–2002); Smooth FM (2002-2017)
- Former frequencies: 101.5 MHz (1992–1995)
- Call sign meaning: Luis and Leonida Vera (original owners)

Technical information
- Licensing authority: NTC
- Class: A/B/C
- Power: 5,000 watts
- ERP: 15,000 watts

Links
- Webcast: Listen live (via TuneIn)

DZLL (107.1 FM), broadcasting as 107.1 MemoRieS FM, is a radio station owned and operated by Primax Broadcasting Network. Its studio and transmitter are located at Primax Compound, Diplomat Rd., Dominican Hill, Baguio.

== History ==
The station was established in 1992 as Mellow Touch with a soft adult contemporary format. It was initially situated on 101.5 MHz. In 1995, it went off the air due to signal interference with a radio station in another province. It went back on air on its current frequency a year later.

In 1997, when FBS Radio Network sold the station to Primax, the station underwent transition under the Smooth Jazz branding and switched to a smooth jazz format. Months later, it added soul and R&B to its playlist.

The following year, it was rebranded as City Lite with the tagline "Take it Easy". It was home of Beatbox, which airs only hip hop and R&B. Its notable morning program was The Breakfast Club. The station was an affiliate of Manila-based Raven Broadcasting Corporation, which owns a station with the same name. In 2002, the station cut ties with Raven and rebranded as Smooth FM with the tagline "Your Stress-Free Radio".

In March 2017, the station was rebranded as MemoRies FM 107.1 with a classic hits format. It was an affiliate of the Radio Mindanao Network until 2025.
