= Bilyonaryo News Channel =

Philippine news television channel

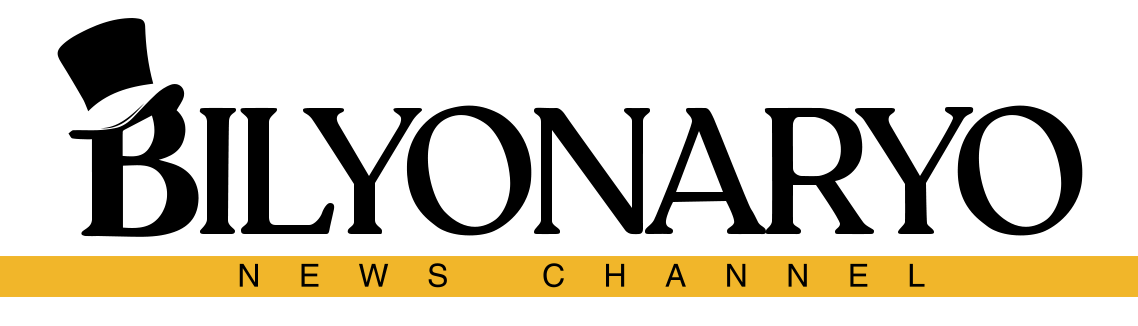
- Country: Philippines
- Broadcast area: Nationwide
- Headquarters: 60 P. Tuazon Boulevard, Barangay Bagong Lipunan Ng Crame, Cubao, Quezon City

Programming
- Languages: English (main); Tagalog (for Agenda and other programs)
- Picture format: 720p/1080i HDTV (downscaled to 16:9 480i for the SDTV feed)

Ownership
- Owner: Abante-Bilyonaryo Group
- Sister channels: Abante News TV (TV channel); Abante News TV (AM station); Mellow 94.7 BFM

History
- Launched: July 15, 2024; 2 years ago (test broadcast); September 9, 2024; 2 years ago (official launch)
- Replaced: TV Shop Philippines (BEAM TV channel space); Aliw Channel 23 (Cignal TV channel renumbering space)

Links
- Website: www.bnc.ph

Availability

Terrestrial
- BEAM TV (Nationwide): Channel x.4 (DTT)
- Cignal TV (Nationwide): Channel 24
- Sky Direct (Nationwide): Channel 13
- G Sat (Nationwide): Channel 40
- SkyCable (Metro Manila): Channel 33
- Cablelink (Metro Manila): Channel 67
- Sky TV (Nationwide): Channel 41
- SatLite (Nationwide): Channel 61

Streaming media
- Blast TV: Internet Protocol television (Philippines only; requires monthly subscription)
- Cignal Play: Watch Live (Philippines only; requires monthly subscription)
- Samsung TV Plus: Internet Protocol television (Philippines only)
- TCLtv+: Internet Protocol television (Philippines only)
- Other affiliated streaming services: Amasian TV (North America only)

Bilyonaryo News Channel is a Philippine free-to-air terrestrial network and pay television news channel based in Quezon City, Philippines and it is currently owned by the Abante-Bilyonaryo Group (Prage Management Corporation), the company behind business news website Bilyonaryo and other media platforms including Politiko and Abante.

BNC's programming is mainly composed of business, economy, and corporate shows, talk shows, newscasts and lifestyle shows hosted by former personalities of ABS-CBN News, CNN Philippines and other networks.

BNC (along with Abante News TV) is distributed by Tap Digital Media Ventures.

Prior to the launch of BNC, Bilyonaryo.com first ventured into television production through Usapang Bilyonaryo, a 30-minute business talk show formerly aired on CNN Philippines.

== Programs ==
=== News ===
- Agenda (2024)
  - Agenda Weekend (2024)
- Agenda North America (2026)
- Metro Morning (2026)
- Midday Report (2026)
- NewsFeed (2024–25, 2026)
- NewsFeed Weekend (2024)
- Politiko Nightly (2025)

=== Current affairs ===
- Abogado (2025)
- At the Forefront (2024)
- Ex-Men: Former Cabinet Secretaries (2026)
- Memo with Korina Sanchez–Roxas (2026)
- On Point with Pinky Webb (2024)
- Pay It Forward with Maricar Bautista (2025)
- Pinoy World (2026)
- Politiko Talks (2025)
- Power Shift (2026)
- The Commanders (2026)
- The Spokes (2025)
- What's The Point? (2026)

=== Comedy ===
- Aganda: Brave, Bold, Bongga! (2026)

=== Business ===
- 24K with Korina Sanchez-Roxas (2026)
- Bankero Unfiltered (2026)
- Beyond The Game (2025)
- Business 360 with Margaux Salcedo (2025)
- Follow The Money (2024–25, 2026)
- Usapang Bilyonaryo (2024–25, 2026)

=== Sports ===
- Philippine Olympic Hour (2026)
- Sports Ambush (2026)
- That Golf Show (2026)
- The Scorecard (2024)

=== Infotainment, Lifestyle, Magazine and talk ===
- After Hours (2026)
- Bilyonaryo Quiz B (2025)
- ChatVIP (2026)
- Dayaw (2024)
- Kutis Reveal - Hosted by Dr. Kei Rebolledo (2026)
- Sessions with Brian Yamsuan (2025)
- Shift Happens (2026)
- Shifting Gears (2026)
- The Daily Dish (2025)
- The Semerads: Halfie Together (2026)
- Wellness is Wealth (2026)

=== Religious (Jesuit Communications) ===
- Kape't Pandasal (2024)
- Keep The Faith: Daily Mass with the Jesuits (2024)
- The Word Exposed with Cardinal Luis Antonio Tagle (2024)

=== Former/previous programming ===
- Agenda: Hard Truths (2025)
- Basis Points (2024)
- Beautiful Day (formerly as It’s a Beautiful Day!, 2024–25)
- Biyaheng Langit (2025)
- Business Brief (formerly as NewsFeed Business, 2025)
- Chinese By Heart, Filipino By Blood (2025)
- Diskarteng MegaMilyonaryo (2024–25)
- Go Rampa with Me (2026)
- Industry Beacon (2024–25)
- JESSUP 2025: The Philippine Rounds Journey (2025)
- Kasangga Mo ang Langit (2025)
- Kwatro Kantos (2024–25)
- Lifeline with Carelle Herrera (2025)
- Love on Top with Tessa Prieto (2025)
- Matteo G. Primetime (2026)
- NewsFeed
  - NewsFeed @ Noon (2024–25)
  - NewsFeed @ 6 pm (2024)
  - World NewsFeed (2024)
- Pathways to Success (2024–25)
- Rampa (2025)
- Snow Bomb (2025)
- Tech Bytes (2025–26)
- The Lifestyle Lab with Marie (2024–25)
- Trade Talks (2025)
- Unpopular Opinion (2026)
- Unscripted with Ferdi Salvador (2025–26)
- Weather HQ (2024–25)

=== TV specials ===
- Cancel Corruption Now! (September 21 and November 30, 2025)
- Palace Under Siege (November 16–17, 2025)
- SONA (State of the Nation Address): The Nation’s Agenda (July 22, 2024–present)
- YourVoice 2025 Elections Agenda (May 12–13, 2025)

== Notable personalities ==
- Lito Banayo
- Jimmy Bondoc
- Hernani Braganza
- Alex Calleja
- Ricky Carandang
- Trixie Cruz-Angeles
- Ben Evardone
- Jesus Falcis
- Maria Gigante
- Barry Gutierrez
- Raymond Gutierrez
- Edwin Lacierda
- Orly Mercado
- Ambet Nabus
- Ronaldo Puno
- Korina Sanchez-Roxas
- Margaux Salcedo
- Bea Santiago
- Jon Santos
- David Semerad
- Mel Sta. Maria
- Cardinal Luis Antonio Tagle
- Charles Tiu
- Jay Tarriela
- Bambol Tolentino
- Nicolas Torre
- Pinky Webb
- Brian Yamsuan
- Gwen Zamora

== Availability ==
Bilyonaryo News Channel is seen via BEAM TV's digital terrestrial UHF channel 31 in Mega Manila, Cebu, Zamboanga and Davao, UHF channel 26 in Baguio and Iloilo, UHF channel 36 in Batangas, UHF channel 32 in Naga, UHF channel 33 in Legazpi, UHF channel 28 in Tacloban, UHF channel 43 in Cagayan de Oro and UHF channel 51 in General Santos from 6 am to 12 mn daily; it also broadcasts 24 hours daily via Cignal Channel 24 (Nationwide), SkyCable Channel 33 (Mega Manila), Sky Direct Channel 13 (Nationwide), Converge Vision Channel 74, Sky TV Channel 41, Cablelink Channel 67 (Metro Manila), G Sat Channel 40 (Nationwide), Samsung TV Plus, which can be viewed via Samsung Smart TVs., and TCL Smart TVs. Selected programming are also simulcast on DWAR Abante, Mellow 94.7 BFM, K5 News FM stations nationwide, Radyo Trumpeta 95.7 Cagayan de Oro, CLTV36 (Free-to-air Digital TV Channel 36 in Pampanga, Cignal Channel 115 and Air Cable Channel 71) and streaming on the Cignal Play app, Blast TV, kAPPitbahay app, Amasian TV (for North America), Global Filipino Network, its official YouTube channel, and Facebook page.

== See also ==
- Abante (tabloid)
- Abante (radio station)
- Politiko
- List of news television channels
- ABS-CBN News Channel
- QTV/Q (defunct)
- GMA News TV (defunct)
- CNN Philippines (defunct)
- One News
- CLTV 36
