= Triplicity (Red Roots album) =

Studio album by Red Roots
- Released: January 7, 2014
- Genre: Christian country, bluegrass, southern gospel
- Length: 37:04
- Label: Red Hen, Daywind

Red Roots chronology
The Middle of Nowhere (2012)	Triplicity (2014)

Triplicity is the third studio album from Red Roots. Red Hen Records, alongside Daywind Music Group, released the album on January 7, 2014. The Last Album Before Redroots was renamed Taylor Red.

== Critical reception ==
Professional ratings
Review scores
Source	Rating
Christian Music Zine	4.5/5 stars
Cross Rhythms	8/10 squares
Indie Vision Music	4/5 stars

Indicating an eight out of ten reviews for Cross Rhythms, Tony Cummings responds, "This could well be the album that broadens the trio's fanbase." Jonathan Andre, signaling in a four star review at Indie Vision Music, replies, "With so many life experiences and rich poignant gems of wisdom in each of these 10 tracks, Triplicity is not your average rock, pop or CCM album, and frankly, if I hadn’t heard 'Turn Around' in 2012, I may not have decided to check out Red Roots, or even write about this unique and thought provoking album today." Assigning the album a four and a half star review from Christian Music Zine, Joshua Andre recognizes, "It takes some time to get used to the genre, yet after listening to the album, Triplicity sounds pretty good".

== Track listing ==
No.	Title	Length
1.	"Seven Days"	3:46
2.	"Ordinary Girl"	3:35
3.	"Great Big Yes"	4:19
4.	"Beautiful"	3:18
5.	"All of My Life"	2:58
6.	"If I Could"	4:07
7.	"One More Night"	3:59
8.	"Straight Shooter"	3:44
9.	"Beautiful Storm"	3:11
10.	"Come Around"	4:07
Total length:		37:04
