= Blast TV =

Internet-based TV and streaming service in the Philippines

- Former name: TapGo
- Website type: OTT streaming platform
- Available in: English; Filipino (select titles only; in dubbed versions)
- Area served: Philippines
- Owner: TAP Digital Media Ventures Corporation
- Website: welcome.blasttv.ph
- Registration: Required
- Launched: 2020; 6 years ago
- Current status: Active

Blast TV (formerly TapGo) is a Philippine over-the-top streaming media and free ad-supported streaming television service owned by TAP Digital Media Ventures Corporation. The service offers in-house linear streaming channels, as well as video on demand content from NBCUniversal, Paramount Skydance, Sony Pictures Entertainment, MGM Television, Lionsgate, FilmRise, Voltage Pictures, Millennium Media, CJ ENM, Medialink and Muse Communication. In addition, Blast TV also houses Studio Universal.

The service is available to Converge and Globe broadband subscribers in the Philippines.

== History ==
=== As TAP Go ===
The service traced its origins in 2020 as TAP Go, a streaming service offering live channels from TAP DMV and live sporting events. TAP Go was suspending its operations in November 2020, but continues to stream live football on its sister site PremierFootball.ph. The service resumed in August 2021, coinciding with TAP DMV's coverage of Manny Pacquiao's recently concluded bout against Yordenis Ugas on its own cable channels.

TAP Go was relaunched in October 2022 with additional live TV channels from third-party content providers like Warner Bros. Discovery Asia-Pacific, Paramount Global, Rock Entertainment Holdings, and ABS-CBN. In addition, TAP Go has also offers in-house FAST/linear channels through a partnership with Endeavor Streaming, namely: Laff, Crime TV, Comic U, and Game Show Central.

=== As Blast TV ===
In August 2023, TAP DMV and Converge ICT formally launched Blast TV, originally a FAST-oriented streaming service that offers linear channels and video on-demand content.

On September 18, 2023, TAP DMV launched a new hub for Blast TV called Studio Universal, a linear channel and video-on-demand.

On November 3, 2023, TAP DMV officially shut down the TAP Go service, with its entire content were merged into Blast TV.

On January 20, 2024, TAP DMV announced that it will launch a new content hub for Paramount+ within the Blast TV service, after the latter signed a licensing agreement with Paramount Global Content Distribution, which was later launched on May 23, 2025.

Blast TV began carrying some anime titles from regional licensing distributors: Muse Communication in September 2024 and Medialink (via Ani-One) in June 2025.

On June 5, 2026, streaming content hub Paramount+ was discontinued, after a year since its launch due to expiration of its contract with Paramount Global Content Distribution.

== Content and availability ==
As of 2024, Blast TV offers in-house linear channels (Laff, Crime TV, Comic U, Game Show Central, Blast Cinema, Family Movies, Fear, Blast Action, Reality TV, Talk Shows, and Showcase Drama) in addition to its own cable channels that are also streamed on the said service, as well as third-party channels including from CJ ENM (tvN Asia and tvN Movies Pinoy) and Prage Management Corporation (Abante TV and Bilyonaryo News Channel). In addition, Blast TV also houses the Studio Universal hub, which features content library from NBCUniversal; and Setanta Sports, which broadcasts live coverages of selected matches from the Premier League, La Liga and the NBA.

The service is available free of charge for Converge FiberX subscribers (including Surf2Sawa and Bida Fiber plans) as well as for Globe At Home broadband subscribers (both Prepaid and Postpaid), but requires user membership. Subscription for non-telco partners is also available on a monthly payment basis.

In May 2025, Blast TV becomes available for Dito Telecommunity mobile subscribers thru both paid subscription with Dito prepaid and free streaming via Dito mobile application.

== See also ==
- TAP Digital Media Ventures Corporation
