= DWBL-AM =

Radio station in Metro Manila, Philippines

DWBL
- Mandaluyong; Philippines
- Broadcast area: Metro Manila and surrounding areas
- Frequency: 1242 kHz
- Branding: DWBL 1242

Programming
- Languages: Filipino, English (selected programs)
- Format: Blocktime (News, Talk)
- Affiliations: Adventist World Radio (selected programming); Pan American Broadcasting (Sunday programming)

Ownership
- Owner: FBS Radio Network
- Sister stations: Through Prage: Mellow 94.7 BFM; Abante

History
- First air date: 1972
- Former frequencies: 1190 kHz (1972-1978)
- Call sign meaning: Bagong Lipunan

Technical information
- Licensing authority: NTC
- Power: 20,000 watts

Links
- Webcast: DWBL 1242; DWBL Facebook Page

DWBL (1242 AM) is a radio station owned and operated by FBS Radio Network in the Philippines. The station's studio is located at Unit 908, Paragon Plaza, EDSA corner Reliance Street, Mandaluyong, while its transmitter is located along Coloong 1 Road, Barangay Coloong, Valenzuela, Metro Manila.

== History ==
DWBL was launched in late 1972 as WBL with a Top 40 format. It was the top-rated radio station in Metro Manila during the Martial Law era. Among the roster of personalities who worked with the station were Willy "Hillbilly Willy" Inong, Rudolph Rivera, Bernie Buenaseda, Orlando S. Mercado, and Mike Enriquez. By 1985, with most of the jocks moving to RMN's DWKC-FM, Buenaseda remained with DWBL, but left after a few months to set up WTM 89.9. The following year, DWBL reformatted into a talk station, offering brokered programming.

In April 2015, 8TriMedia, a media firm owned by rice trader Jojo Soliman and veteran broadcaster Kaye Dacer, took over part of DWBL's airtime for its programs hosted by popular radio personalities, such as Dr. Rey Salinel, former Manila City mayor Alfredo Lim, Miguel Gil, Percy Lapid, Shalala and Lloyd Umali. It lasted until October 2015, when the company transferred its airtime to DZRJ, along with new programs.

From February 10 to March 15, 2026, DWBL and Abante went off the air to make way for transmitter upgrades. Cable and online streaming remained unaffected.
