= DWRW =

Radio station in Pampanga, Philippines

RW 95.1 (DWRW)
- San Fernando; Philippines
- Broadcast area: Central Luzon and surrounding areas
- Frequency: 95.1 MHz
- Branding: RW 95.1

Programming
- Languages: Kapampangan, Tagalog, English
- Format: Adult Contemporary, OPM, Talk
- Affiliations: RMN Networks

Ownership
- Owner: RadioWorld Broadcasting Corporation
- Sister stations: CLTV36 HD

History
- First air date: August 17, 1995
- Call sign meaning: Radio World

Technical information
- Licensing authority: NTC
- Class: A/B/C/D/E
- Power: 5,000 watts
- ERP: 10,000 watts

Links
- Webcast: Listen Live
- Website: RW 95.1 FM

DWRW (95.1 FM), broadcasting as RW 95.1, is a radio station owned and operated by RadioWorld Broadcasting Corporation (RBC Media Group), a unit of the Laus Group of Companies. The station's studio is located at the 3rd Floor CGIC Building, Jose Abad Santos Avenue, San Fernando, Pampanga, while its transmitter is located along Dau Access Road, Mabalacat. It operates daily from 04:30 AM to 10:00 PM.

It was launched on August 17, 1995, as a center of communication and relief operation hub for the victims of the Mt. Pinatubo lahars.

RW 95.1 FM earned the 16th, 20th, 24th and 27th KBP Golden Dove Awards (2007, 2011, 2016 and 2019) as Best Provincial FM Radio Station in the Philippines.

== See also ==
- CLTV36 HD
