= Taylor Red =

Country music group from Mississippi

- Also known as: Red Roots
- Origin: Hurley, Mississippi, United States
- Genre: Country
- Years active: 2010–present
- Labels: Inpop, Daywind, Red Hen
- Members: Natalie Taylor; Nika Taylor
- Past members: Nicole Taylor

Taylor Red (formerly Red Roots) is an American country music trio from Hurley, Mississippi. They started making music in 2010, with their first studio album, Red Roots, that was independently released by Red Hen Records, in 2011. Their second release, The Middle of Nowhere, a studio album, released in 2012, with Red Hen Records. The third studio album, Triplicity, was released in 2014, from Red Hen Records. The trio signed with Inpop Records, in 2015. In 2018, the band formally changed its name from Red Roots to Taylor Red.

The bands' triplets are singers, songwriters, composers, and multi-instrumentalists who play guitar, banjo, fiddle, and mandolin.

== Music history ==
The sister trio started as a musical entity in 2011, with their first independently released album, Red Roots, that was released on January 24, 2011, with Red Hen Records. Their subsequent studio album, The Middle of Nowhere, was released on March 20, 2012, by Red Hen Records. They released, Triplicity, the third studio album, on January 7, 2014, from Red Hen Records alongside Daywind Music. The group was signed to Inpop Records in 2015.

Taylor Red released track Country Money in March 2021. It was produced by Ilya Toshinsky and written by J.T. Harding, Matt Jenkins, and Andrew DeRoberts. The track was added to Spotify Editorial playlists and went viral on TikTok.

Taylor Red was featured in the national Sonic Drive-In campaign commercials for 2020-2021. The trio performed over 1,000 live shows across America and internationally in countries such as Norway and Canada, opening for acts including Amy Grant, Charlie Daniels, Diamond Rio, Don Williams, High Valley, Josh Turner, and Michael W. Smith.

On November 2, 2026, Natalie and Nika released a video on Taylor Red social media feeds announcing Nicole's death from breast cancer on September 28. She was 35.

== Members ==
- Natalie Jean Taylor – current lead vocals, mandolin, violin, bass
- Nika Lea Taylor – vocals, former lead singer, guitar, banjo, violin

=== Former member ===
- Nicole Helen Taylor – original lead vocals, guitar, banjo, violin (died 2026)

== Discography ==
Studio Albums

- Red Roots (January 24, 2011, Red Hen)
- The Middle of Nowhere (March 20, 2012, Red Hen)
- Taylor Red - EP (April 27, 2013, Red Hen)
- Triplicity (January 7, 2014, Red Hen/Daywind)
