= Paul van Gelder =

Dutch disc jockey (1947–2024)

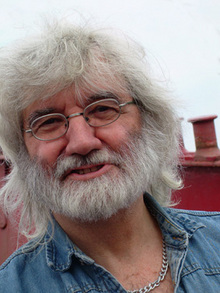
- Van Gelder in 2015
- Born: Harald Paul van Gelder; 5 April 1947; Schiedam, Netherlands
- Died: 2 December 2024 (aged 77)
- Occupation: Disc jockey

Harald Paul van Gelder (5 April 1947 – 2 December 2024), who worked under the name Harkie or Harky, was a Dutch disc jockey.

== Life and career ==
Van Gelder was born in Schiedam on 5 April 1947. He studied at the University of Amsterdam. His career began in 1963 as a copywriter. In 1967 he worked as a program maker at the radio station Radio 227, which reached a huge amount of listeners every week. He became later known for the VARA night program Geen tijd (1989–2014).

Van Gelder was also banjoist-singer in the group "Bottle up & Go".

Van Gelder died on 2 December 2024, at the age of 77.
