= Pinky Webb =

Filipino journalist (born 1970)

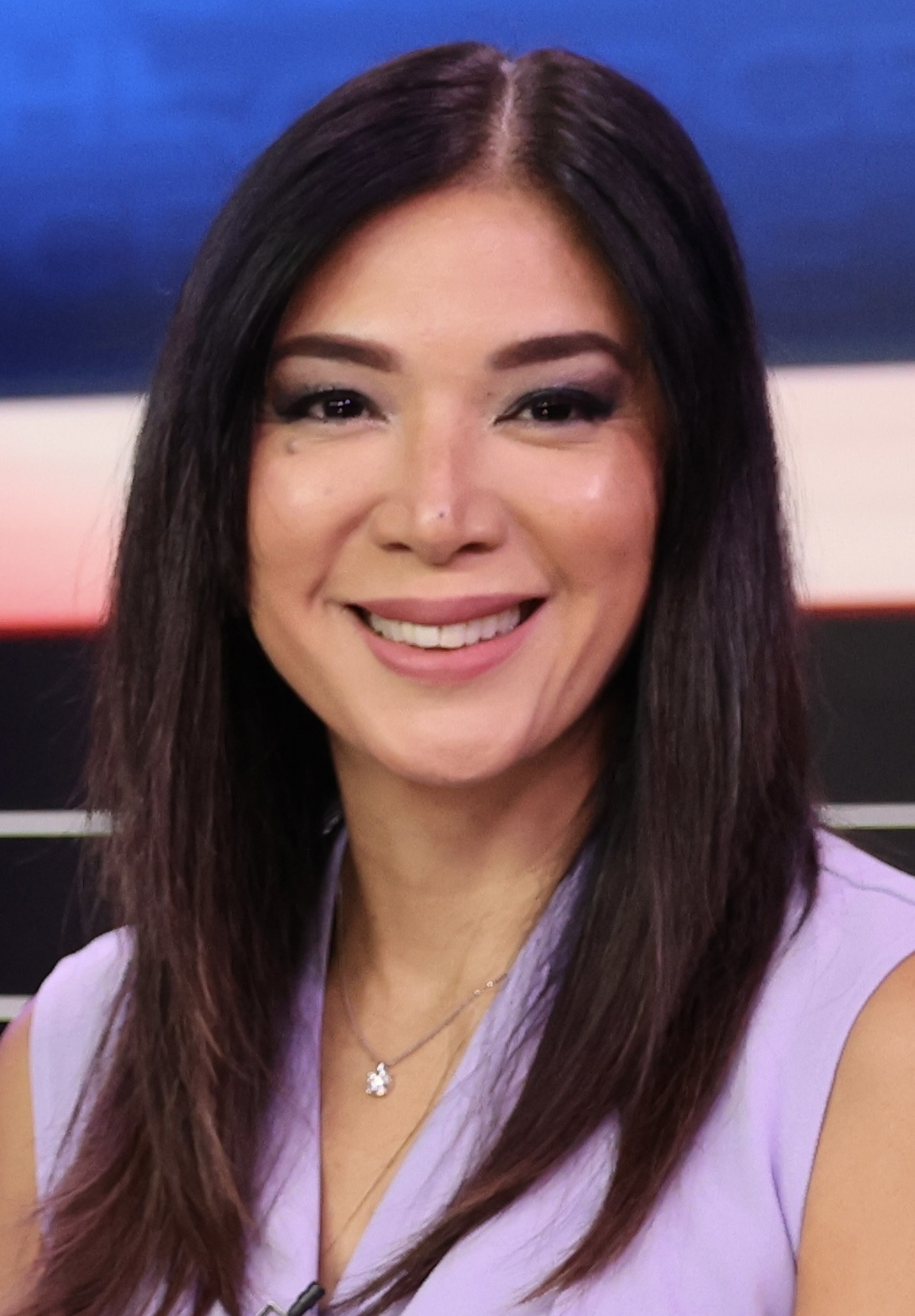
- Webb in 2023
- Born: Joanna Marie Pagaspas Webb; June 11, 1970 (age 56)
- Education: De La Salle University
- Occupation: Journalist
- Years active: 1997–present
- Employer(s): Associated Broadcasting Company (1997); ABS-CBN (1997–2015); CNN Philippines (2016–24); Bilyonaryo News Channel (2024–present); CLTV36 (2026–present)

Joanna Marie "Pinky" Pagaspas Webb (born June 11, 1970) is a Filipino broadcast journalist, television news anchor and host, best known for her work on CNN Philippines, Bilyonaryo News Channel, and CLTV36. as the anchor of the programs Balitaan and The Source with Pinky Webb (both 2016–2024). and as an anchor for Agenda and On Point with Pinky Webb (since 2024). She is the daughter of former senator Freddie Webb and a sister of basketball coach Jason Webb, as well as Hubert Webb.

== Education ==
Webb attended high school at Colegio San Agustin where she was batchmates with Kris Aquino and Karen Davila. Webb studied at De La Salle University where she initially took AB Psychology then decided to shift to AB Management. Webb also took up a few courses at UCLA and Cal State Long Beach on journalism for a semester.

== Career ==
During her career days at ABC 5 as a news advisory anchor, and she later joined to ABS-CBN, Webb was a first news anchor of ANC Primetime News (1999–2004) and Dateline Philippines (2004–2014) and also host of Umagang Kay Ganda, XXX: Exklusibong, Explosibong, Exposé (from 2008 until the show ended) and TV Patrol Weekend. She was a radio co-anchor of Radyo Patrol Balita Alas Kwatro and the radio commentary program Tambalang Failon at Webb on weekdays with Ted Failon on DZMM. On May 9, 2015, The Philippine Star reported that Webb has resigned from ABS-CBN.

Webb joined CNN Philippines in 2016. The network confirmed her move in a tweet. She debuted with CNN Philippines on April 4, 2016, as the first anchor of its Filipino-language newscast, Balitaan. On September 26, 2016, Webb named as a host for a new current affairs daily program titled The Source.

In July 2024, six months after the closure of CNN Philippines—which was relaunched as NewsWatch Plus that same month, Webb joined the Bilyonaryo News Channel and CLTV36 alongside former colleagues from ABS-CBN and CNN Philippines. She co-anchors the network’s flagship newscast, Agenda, with veteran broadcast journalist Korina Sanchez, former ABS-CBN reporter Willard Cheng and actor Matteo Guidicelli. Webb also hosts the interview-format program On Point.

== Filmography ==
=== Television ===
Year	Title	Role
1999–2004	ANC Primetime News	News Anchor
2001–2015	TV Patrol	Fill-in anchor
2004–2014	Dateline Philippines	News Anchor
2007–2011	Umagang Kay Ganda	Host
2008–2013	XXX: Exklusibong, Explosibong, Exposé	Host
2011–2015	Mornings @ ANC	News Anchor
2011–2015	TV Patrol Weekend	News Anchor
2016–2024	Balitaan	News Anchor
2016–2024	The Source	Host
2017–2018	On the Record	One of the host contributors
2018–2019; 2024–present	Business Matters	Host
2024–present	Agenda	News Anchor
2024–present	On Point	Host

== Radio ==
Year	Title	Role
2002–2009	Radyo Patrol Balita Alas-Kwatro	News Anchor
2004–2009	Pasada Sais Trenta Sabado	Host
2009–2012	Tambalang Failon at Webb	Host

== Awards and citations ==
- One of the Best Morning Show Hosts (for Umagang Kay Ganda) - Star Awards for TV (2008, 2009, 2010)
- Best Female Morning Show Host (for Umagang Kay Ganda) - 1st Media Newser Philippines Awards (2010)
- Best Radio Anchor (for Tambalang Failon at Webb) - 9th Gawad Tanglaw (2011)
- Best TV Anchor (for TV Patrol Weekend) - 11th Gawad Tanglaw (2013)
