= Fahmy Omar =

Egyptian radio broadcaster (1928–2026)

- فهمي عمر
- Born: March 6, 1928; Al-Ra'issiya, Naga Hammadi, Qena Governorate, Egypt
- Died: February 25, 2026 (aged 97)
- Other name: Sheikh of the Broadcasters
- Education: Bachelor of Laws (Alexandria University)
- Occupations: Radio Broadcaster; Media Executive; Politician
- Years active: 1950–1988 (Radio)

Fahmy Omar (Arabic: فهمي عمر; March 6, 1928 – February 25, 2026) was an Egyptian radio broadcaster and a onetime head of Egyptian Radio. Nicknamed the "Sheikh of the Broadcasters," he worked in radio for 37 years, rising through the ranks and leaving a lasting legacy. He presented the program "Saa'a Li Qalbak" ("An Hour for Your Heart"), which helped many famous Egyptian comedy stars achieve prominence.

== Early life and education ==
Fahmy Omar was born on March 6, 1928, in the village of Al-Ra'issiya, located in the Naga Hammadi district of Qena Governorate, Egypt.

Due to the absence of a school in his home village, Omar attended primary school in the city of Dishna, a journey of approximately twenty kilometers that required travel by Nile boat. He earned his Primary Certificate in 1940 and subsequently his Secondary Certificate from a school in Qena Governorate.

While his initial ambition was to study medicine or industrial chemistry, he enrolled in the Faculty of Law at Alexandria University in accordance with his family's wish for him to enter the legal profession. He graduated in 1949 with a Bachelor of Laws degree (Al-Ijazah Al-Aliyah). Following graduation, he attempted to join the Public Prosecution Office, aiming for a career as a judge, but was unsuccessful.

== Entry into Egyptian Radio ==
One year after his graduation in 1949, Fahmy Omar applied for the Egyptian Radio examinations. In 1950, he began working for the organization in the role of an "off-microphone announcer" (a production and logistical assistant position). This initial placement was necessitated by his Upper Egyptian (Sa'idi) accent.

This fifteen-month period proved valuable, allowing him to interact with leading intellectuals and cultural figures of the era. By meeting and preparing speakers—including prominent writers and thinkers—before their broadcasts, he established relationships with notable individuals such as Abbas Mahmoud Al-Aqqad, Soliman Naguib, Muhammad Farid Abu Hadid, Fikry Abaza, Zouzou Nabil, Samiha Ayoub, Shahrazad, and Laure Daccache.

Fahmy Omar gained historic prominence as the first media personality to announce the July Revolution of 1952. On the morning of July 23, Omar facilitated the broadcast, opening the radio microphone for Mohamed Anwar Sadat to deliver the pivotal first statement of the revolution.

Following this event, Omar became personally acquainted with Sadat, who subsequently nicknamed him "The Sa'idi Broadcaster" (referencing his Upper Egyptian origins). This moniker became a recognizable part of Omar's public identity after journalist Galil Al-Bendari featured it in an article published in Akher Sa'a magazine.

== Career ==
Fahmy Omar's career at Egyptian Radio spanned nearly four decades, during which he became most famous for presenting "Saa'a Li Qalbak" ("An Hour for Your Heart"), a program credited with launching the careers of many famous Egyptian comedy stars. He also specialized in sports broadcasting, founding and serving as the first commentator for Egyptian League matches, and is considered the founder of Youth and Sports Radio (established in 1954).

His sports coverage included major international events like the Mediterranean Games (1955) and six Olympic Games between 1960 and 1984. Additionally, he hosted three concerts for the legendary Arab singer Umm Kulthum and presented the popular show "Majallat Al-Hawaa" ("Air Magazine"). Omar rose to leadership, serving as the Head of Egyptian Radio from 1982 to 1988. He retired on March 5, 1988, concluding 37 years of influential broadcasting work. Following his retirement, he entered politics, serving as a Member of the House of Representatives from 1987 until 2002. Outside of his media career, he has held positions within the Zamalek Club, including serving as a board member and an Honorary Deputy.

== Death ==
Omar died on February 25, 2026, at the age of 97.
