= Abante Vizcaya =

Regional political party

Abante Vizcaya is a Nueva Vizcaya regional political party in the Philippines, which was formerly affiliated with the Laban ng Demokratikong Pilipino (Agapito Aquino Faction), now closely affiliated with the Nacionalista Party and the Genuine Opposition. It was the former party of incumbent Nueva Vizcaya Congresswoman Luisa Lloren Cuaresma.

== Founding ==
Members of the Laban ng Demokratikong Pilipino created their own local political party for Nueva Vizcaya, making it the only political party in the province. The party was created on July 12, 2005, by Former House Minority Leader Carlos Padilla. The party was deemed independent of any national party.

== History ==
In the 2007 Philippine gubernatorial elections, Carlos Padilla ran under the party against multiple other candidates. In the 2010 Philippine presidential election, the party endorsed Manny Villar of the Nacionalista Party. The group opposed the Presidency of Gloria Macapagal Arroyo.
