= Don Gonyea =

American journalist (born 1956)

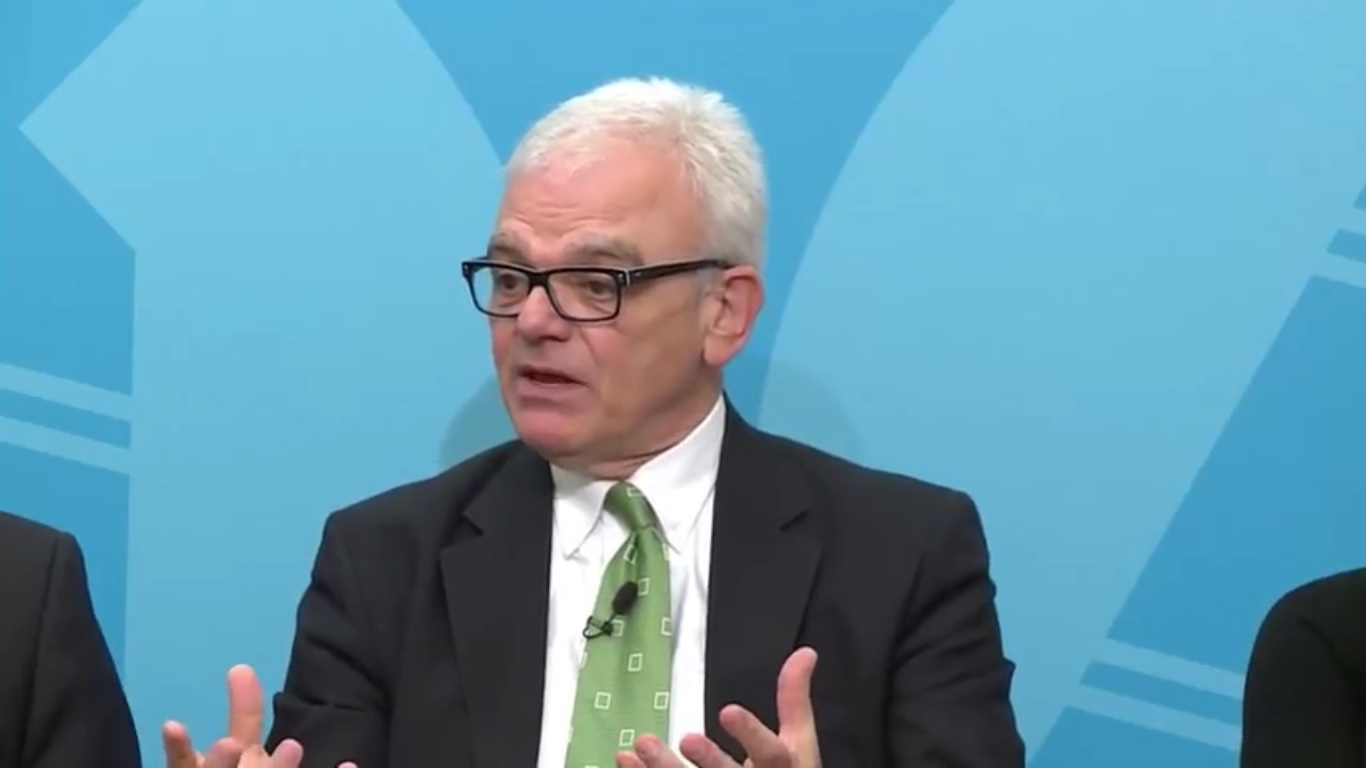
- Don Gonyea in 2017
- Born: 1956 (age 69–70)
- Education: Michigan State University

Don Gonyea (/ˈɡɒnjeɪ/; born 1956) is an American journalist. He is a former national political correspondent for National Public Radio's All Things Considered, Morning Edition, Weekend Edition, and Here and Now programs.

== Education and career ==
Gonyea is a 1978 graduate of Michigan State University, where he worked for the public television station, WKAR-TV.

Gonyea began working for NPR in 1986, reporting on the automobile industry and labor issues in Detroit.

He was part of the team that in 2000 won the Peabody Award for a series called "Lost & Found Sound".

He was awarded the 2013 WKAR Public Media Master Award by the MSU College of Communication Arts and Sciences.

Gonyea took a buyout and left NPR in May 2026. His last evening hosting All Things Considered was July 12, 2026.
