= Agenda (Philippine TV program) =

Philippine television show

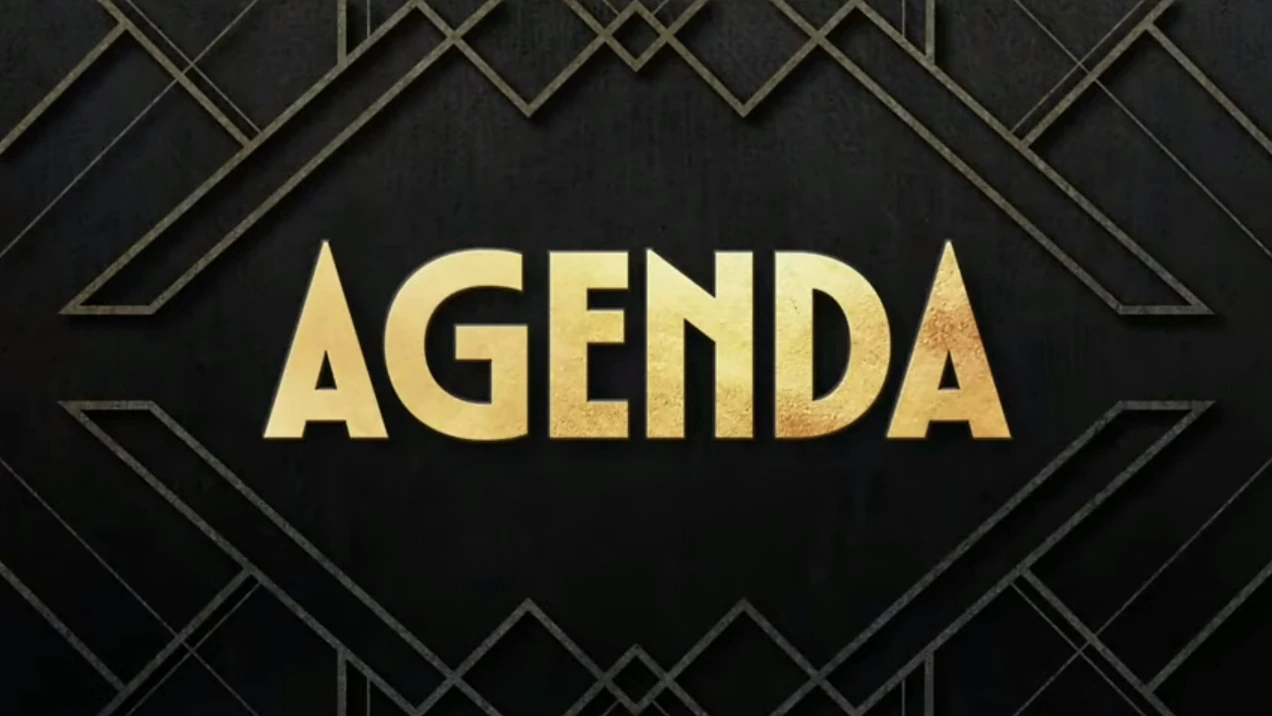
- Genre: News broadcasting; Live television
- Created by: Prage; Bilyonaryo
- Directed by: Arnel Jacobe; Vince Mendo; Jeannie Gualberto
- Presented by: Agenda; Korina Sanchez-Roxas; Pinky Webb; Willard Cheng; Agenda Weekend; Ivy Reyes; Gerg Cahiles
- Country of origin: Philippines
- Original language: Tagalog

Production
- Executive producer: Eddy Caringal
- Production locations: BNC Newscenter, Quezon City, Philippines
- Editors: Marifer Velez; Ellen Onate-Maya; Jun Bolivar
- Running time: 60 minutes (2024–25, weekdays; and 2025–present, weekends) 90 minutes (since 2025, weekdays) 30 minutes (2024–25, weekends)

Original release
- Network: Bilyonaryo News Channel; CLTV36 (July 6, 2026–present)
- Release: September 9, 2024 – present

Agenda is a Philippine television news broadcasting show broadcast by Bilyonaryo News Channel and CLTV36. Originally anchored by former ABS-CBN News anchors Korina Sanchez-Roxas and Pinky Webb, it premiered on September 9, 2024 on the network's evening line up. Sanchez, Webb, and Willard Cheng currently serve as anchors. The weekend edition Agenda Weekend originally known as Weekend Agenda premiered in October 26, 2024. Gerg Cahiles and Ivy Reyes currently serve as anchors.

== Anchors ==
Anchors

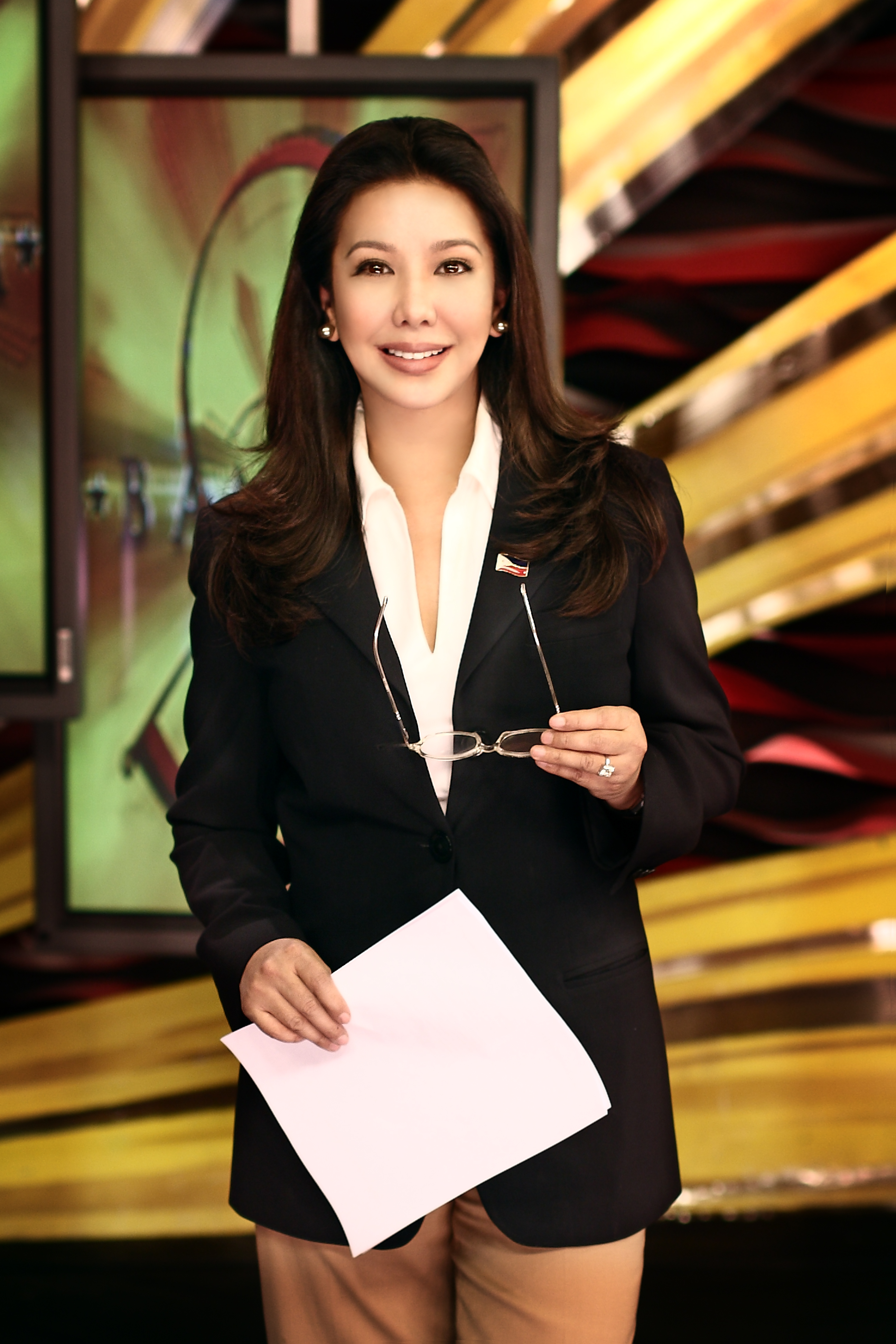
Korina Sanchez

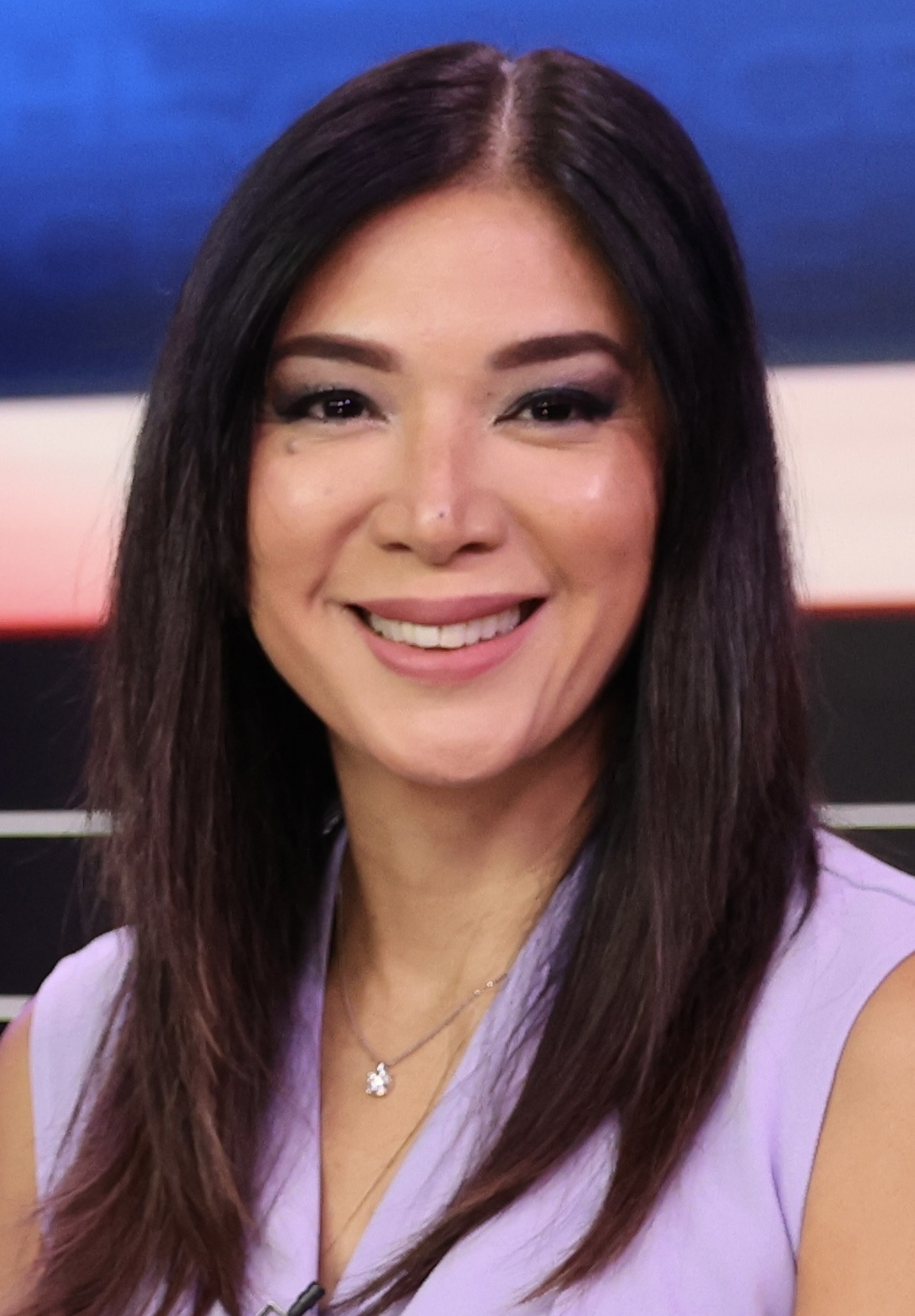
Pinky Webb

=== Agenda ===
- Korina Sanchez-Roxas (since 2024)
- Pinky Webb (since 2024)
- Willard Cheng (since 2025)

=== Agenda Weekend ===
- Gerg Cahiles (since 2024)
- Ivy Reyes (since 2026)

=== Segment presenters ===
- Erika Kristensen-Lee (Babbler, also substitute anchor, since 2025)
- Benison Estareja (BNC Resident meteorologist, since 2026)
- Raymond Gutierrez (Babbler, since 2026)

=== Substitute anchors ===
- Mai Rodriguez (since 2024)
- Bea Rose Santiago (since 2025)
- Pier Pastor (since 2025)

=== Former anchors ===
- Monique Tuzon-Basi (Babbler, 2025–26)
- Ferdi Salvador (Babbler, 2025–26)
- Matteo Guidicelli (2025–26)
- Anne Asis-Carilo (Agenda Weekend, 2024–25)

== Segments ==
- Headlines – top stories.
- Babbler – showbiz news.
- Weather – weather forecast.
