= FBS Radio Network =

Philippine radio network

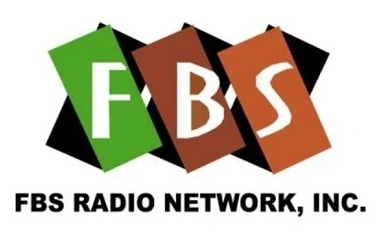
- Formerly: Freedom Broadcasting System
- Type: Statutory corporation Private
- Industry: Mass media Radio broadcasting
- Founded: 1961
- Founder: Leonida Laki-Vera; Luis Vera
- Headquarters: Mandaluyong, Philippines
- Key people: Luis "Luigi" Vera Jr. (President)
- Website: www.mellow947.com

FBS Radio Network is a Philippine broadcasting company. Its corporate office is located at Unit 908, Paragon Plaza, EDSA cor. Reliance St., Mandaluyong.

== History ==
Leonida "Nida" Laki-Vera and her husband Luis Vera began their broadcast business as the Freedom Broadcasting System (FBS) in the 1970s. FBS launched its first station DWBL. A year later, FBS established its FM station DWLL, which is later on known as Mellow Touch. Radio personalities such as Butch Gonzales, Rudolph Rivera, and newscaster Ernie Fresnido worked for DWBL and Mellow Touch throughout the late 70s.

As time passed by towards the 1990s, the couple transferred the ownership of FBS to their children, namely Luis Jr. ("Luigi") and Lena. To coincide their business, the network dropped its legal name and became FBS Radio Network. Under the new owners, FBS expanded the Mellow Touch network in key provincial cities.

In 2004, FBS sold its two respective stations DWKT (Dagupan) and DYLL (Cebu) to Ultrasonic Broadcasting System. In return, UBSI sold its AM station DWSS to FBS, which uses the franchise of Supreme Broadcasting System to comply with ownership restrictions.

On December 21, 2020, FBS was granted a 25-year legislative franchise extension under Republic Act No. 11507, which lapsed into law after 30 days of inaction by then-Philippine President Rodrigo Duterte. The law grants FBS a franchise to construct, install, operate, and maintain, for commercial purposes, radio broadcasting stations and television stations, including digital television systems, with the corresponding facilities such as relay stations, throughout the Philippines.

== FBS Radio stations ==
=== AM stations ===
Branding	Callsign	Frequency	Location	Operator
DWBL	DWBL	1242 kHz	Metro Manila	—N/a
Abante	DWSS (Note: Licensed under Supreme Broadcasting System.)	1494 kHz	Metro Manila	Prage Management Corporation

=== FM stations ===
Branding	Callsign	Frequency	Location	Operator
Mellow BFM	DWLL	94.7 MHz	Metro Manila	Prage Management Corporation
K5 News FM Iloilo	DYKU	88.7 MHz	Iloilo	5K Broadcasting Network
K5 News FM Bais	—N/a	99.1 MHz	Bais	5K Broadcasting Network
Radyo Trumpeta	DXBL	95.7 MHz	Cagayan de Oro	Shanne Manufacturing and Trading Corporation
Radyo Lampornas Gingoog	—N/a	92.9 MHz	Gingoog	—N/a
Radyo Lampornas Valencia	DXOC	103.3 MHz	Valencia	—N/a

=== Former stations ===
Callsign	Frequency	Location	Status
DZLL	107.1 MHz	Baguio	Currently owned by Primax Broadcasting Network.
DWKT	90.3 MHz	Dagupan	Currently owned by Ultrasonic Broadcasting System.
DYLL	94.7 MHz	Cebu City	Currently owned by Ultrasonic Broadcasting System.
DXLL	94.7 MHz	Davao City	Currently owned by Rizal Memorial Colleges Broadcasting Corporation.
