= Politiko (website) =

Filipino news website

- Screenshot Homepage in November 2024
- Website type: Online news website
- Owners: MCD Multimedia Corporation; Prage Management Corporation
- Website: politiko.com.ph
- Launched: November 1, 2014; 11 years ago
- Current status: Online

Politiko (transl. Politician) is a Filipino news website covering Philippine politics. Politiko was established in 2014 and managed by MCD Multimedia Corporation (as mentioned in the disclaimer of their website) and Prage Management Corporation who also controls the operation of the tabloid newspaper Abante as well as sibling websites, Bilyonaryo, Abogado and NewsKo.

In 2016, Politiko became one of the top media sites in the Philippines just after its first 2 years online marking its presence among social media users.

== History ==
Politiko started its operation and presence in the social media in August 2014 with its Facebook page created on June 25, 2014. It first focused on current political events within Metro Manila, then Politiko expanded its scope region-wide adding Central Luzon, North Luzon, Mindanao, Bicol/MIMAROPA and Visayas.

== Book launching ==
Politiko released a political almanac called Politiko 365 in 2017 which were attended by influential politicians including former Philippine President Benigno Aquino III. The second edition of the book was also published in 2018.
