= Prage =

Philippine media outlet

Abante-Bilyonaryo Group (Prage Management Corporation)
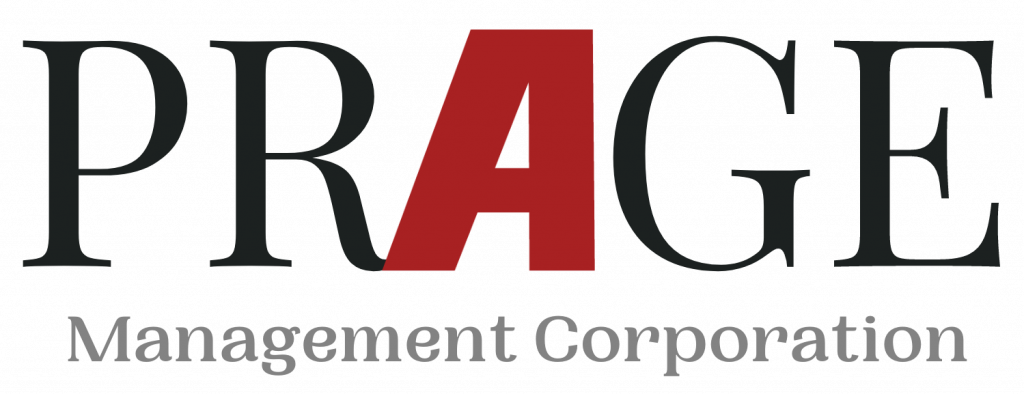
- Type: Private
- Industry: Mass media
- Founded: 2018
- Headquarters: 60 P. Tuazon Boulevard, Barangay Bagong Lipunan, Cubao, Quezon City, Philippines
- Key people: Rey Marfil (Chairman); Gil Cabacungan, Jr. (President and General Manager)
- Brands: Abante; Politiko; Bilyonaryo
- Services: Publishing, Broadcasting, Digital media, Content creation
- Website: abgroup.com.ph

Abante-Bilyonaryo Group, with the corporate name Prage Management Corporation is a Philippines-based mass media outlet. Founded in 2018, the company owns the tabloid newspaper Abante, and multiple digital news websites including Politiko, Bilyonaryo and Abogado.

== History ==
Prior to the formation of Prage, Politiko was launched in 2014.

Prage was founded in 2018 as a start-up led by seasoned journalists, former Presidential Communications Operations Office Undersecretary Rey Marfil, former Philippine Daily Inquirer senior reporter, Gil Cabacungan, Jr., and a group of investors.

== Assets ==
=== Politiko ===
Politiko, under its website politiko.com.ph, is a joint co-ownership of Prage and MCD Multimedia Corporation. The website focuses on politics-related news and current events.

=== Abante ===
Abante and its sister publication Abante Tonite are tabloid newspapers published daily. Prage acquired the tabloid newspapers from Monica Publishing Corporation of the Macasaet family in October 2017.

=== Bilyonaryo ===
Bilyonaryo is a finance news website established in 2015, with a focus on highlighting Filipino billionaires/tycoons and their presence in the business sector. The site later ventured into television production (Usapang Bilyonaryo), and later launched its own namesake channel (Bilyonaryo News Channel).

=== Other assets ===
In addition, Prage also operates multimedia brands like Abogado (law and legal issues), NewsKo (periodical news), Fastbreak (sports), and Celebrity Radar (entertainment).

=== Media ventures and partnerships ===
Prage made its first digital venture in the late 2010s with Abante's own online broadcast content, which was later refreshed in 2022 as Abante TeleTabloid. Abante later made its radio presence in 2024 thru its namesake station.

In August 2024, Prage took over the operations of DWSS's sister station Mellow 94.7.

== List of properties ==
=== Print/newspaper ===
Brand	Format
Abante	Tabloid newspaper
Abante Tonite	Tabloid newspaper
NewsKo	Tabloid newspaper

=== Online/digital media ===
Brand	Format
Abogado	Law and legal news
Atletiko	Sports
Bankero	Banking
Bilyonaryo	Business and finance
Fastbreak	Sports
Milyonaryo	Business and finance
Politiko	Political news and current events
TNT (Tunay na Tabloidista)	Tabloid-formatted news

=== Television ===
Brand	Type	Availability
Abante News TV	News channel	Cable, satellite, digital/streaming
Bilyonaryo News Channel	News channel	Free-to-air (digital-only), cable, satellite, digital/streaming

=== Radio ===
Branding	Callsign	Frequency	Location	Notes
Abante News TV	DWSS	1494 KHz	Metro Manila	Frequency owned by Supreme Broadcasting System
Mellow 94.7 BFM	DWLL	94.7 MHz	Metro Manila	Frequency owned by FBS Radio Network
