= Central Luzon Television =

Philippine TV station

DWRW-DTV
- Central Luzon; Philippines
- City: San Fernando, Pampanga
- Channels: Digital: 36 (UHF) (ISDB-T) (test broadcast); Virtual: 36.01
- Branding: CLTV 36

Programming
- Languages: Tagalog, Kapampangan, English
- Subchannels: See list
- Affiliations: 36.1: Independent/Bilyonaryo News Channel 36.2: RBC TEST BROADCAST

Ownership
- Owner: RBC Media Group

History
- First air date: March 19, 2007; 19 years ago
- Former call signs: DWRW-TV (2007–2023)
- Former channel number: Analog (UHF): 36 (2007–2023)
- Call sign meaning: RadioWorld

Technical information
- Licensing authority: NTC
- Power: 2,500 watts (digital)
- Translator(s): (see article)

Links
- Website: cltv36.tv

DWRW-DTV (channel 36), branded as Central Luzon Television 36 or CLTV 36, is an independent television station based in San Fernando, Pampanga, Philippines. It is the sole television property owned by the RadioWorld Broadcasting Corporation, otherwise known as the RBC Media Group (formerly known as the Central Luzon Broadcasting Corporation), a subsidiary of the Laus Group of Companies, which also owns a radio station, DWRW-FM and newspaper SunStar Pampanga.

The station's offices, studio complex, and transmitter are located at the third floor of the Corporate Guarantee Building, Laus Group Complex, Jose Abad Santos Avenue, Barangay Dolores, San Fernando, Pampanga.

It operates daily from 8:00 AM to 9:30 PM. In 2017, DWRW-DTV was named the leading free-to-air regional television channel in the country based on the AGB Nielsen survey for two consecutive years, and was awarded the Best Local TV Station by the Kapisanan ng mga Brodkaster ng Pilipinas (KBP), Paragala Central Luzon Media Awards and Gandingan Awards.

The station is available on pay television providers across the country, making it an example of a superstation outside North America.

DWRW-DTV is also currently affiliated with the Bilyonaryo News Channel.

Corporate Guarantee and Insurance Company building, site of DWRW-DTV's studios and transmitter, in April 2017

== Background ==
As one of the youngest terrestrial television stations in the Philippines, it was created when the Philippine Congress granted it a franchise under Republic Act No. 8219 (which lapsed into law) on September 12, 1997, and it was duly licensed by the country's NTC on January 10, 2007.

The station began transmission as DWRW-TV on March 19, 2007. In 2008, it was relegated to an all-news and infotainment channel.

Throughout most of its history, DWRW-TV focused on centralized media coverage of news, public affairs and infotainment programming, covering all the provinces of Central Luzon: Nueva Ecija, Bulacan, Bataan, Tarlac, Zambales, Aurora, and its home province Pampanga. The station's new tower at Clark Freeport Zone was inaugurated on December 9, 2015. Its signal is also receivable in parts of Metro Manila, Ilocos Region, Cordillera Administrative Region, and Calabarzon (except Batangas, Laguna and Quezon).

The station pioneered extensive and frequently updated coverage of national and local elections and natural disasters that hit the region, including typhoons and northeast monsoons. In 2013, DWRW-TV launched their entertainment programming through the Star Mill Talent Search.

The station is also the official broadcaster of the Giant Lantern Festival every December from 2007, as well as the United Central Luzon Athletic Association games since 2015.

In 2015, DWRW-TV moved its transmission to 10-kilowatt, 68.5m (225ft) tall BTSC stereo transmitter and primary station tower which was located at C.P. Garcia Street, Clark Freeport Zone, Pampanga.

=== Branding changes ===
Before the station's 9th anniversary, on April 2, 2016, it was rebranded as CLTV 36 Metro Central Luzon, along with a new theme song eponymous with the station's branding, performed by the Chocolate Factory Band, and Star Mill alumnus Jeneal Mariano and Andy Pangan.

On its 10th anniversary in 2017, the station reverted to its original brand CLTV 36 with a new slogan, "The Region's Infotainment Channel".

On January 7, 2018, the station reverted to its original slogan, "One Region, One Station".

On March 22, 2019, DWRW-TV, as part of its 12th anniversary celebration with the theme "Championing Local Pride" (also used as a slogan from 2019 to 2022), held its inaugural Social Services Conference and Expo (SocSeCon) at Robinsons Starmills mall in San Fernando, Pampanga.

On June 26, 2020, despite challenges brought by the coronavirus pandemic, the station launched #SaleseMuRin with the re-usage of their 2011 station theme, "Tawag ng Panahon" (lit. 'Call of Time').

On June 27, 2020, the channel migrated to the 16:9 anamorphic widescreen format. The change allowed for a widescreen presentation, optimizing the viewing experience for viewers with compatible widescreen televisions.

On May 14, 2021, DWRW-TV revealed its new logo during its 14th anniversary, replacing the 2007 logo, and revealed its additional programming lineup for 2021.

On May 20, 2022, the station celebrated its 15th anniversary through a business conference and Partner Appreciation Night with the theme, "Ibalik ang Sigla, Ibalik ang Saya ng Lokal na Ekonomiya" (lit. 'Bring Back the Vigor, Bring Back the Fun to the Local Economy'), at Robinsons Starmills in San Fernando.

In November 2022, the station revived one of its previous slogans "Atin 'To" (first used in early 2010s), as well as the station's 2007 logo; the now-former logo continued as a secondary until December 2022. The station re-used its former theme songs throughout its history: their 2013 station theme, "CLTV 36, Kasama Mo", composed by Andy Alviz; and the 2016 station theme "CLTV 36 Metro Central Luzon", albeit with modified lyrics and covered by Kapampangan performer Chew the Cud.

In mid-2023, the station began to de-emphasize its pan-regional content, and began increasing amount of programs focused on Pampanga, while maintaining a small portion of programs in Filipino and English. Thus, the relaunch included the slogan "Pusung Makabalen" ("Patriotic Heart").

In February 2024, DWRW-DTV moved its transmission facilities back on the original site in San Fernando with its newly renovated tower atop of the CGIC Building. It ceased operations of the Clark Tower as a result.

In late September 2024, the station slowly returned to a pan-regional format while still maintaining a small portion of programs in its native language. Plans to build SFN or repeater towers in different parts of the region to expand its digital TV coverage across Central Luzon have been laid but has not yet been materialized.

In June 2026, DWRW-DTV entered into a strategic partnership agreement with the Bilyonaryo News Channel for the simulcast airing of their programming including Agenda and other programs, as well as supplying local news coverage.

== Current programs ==
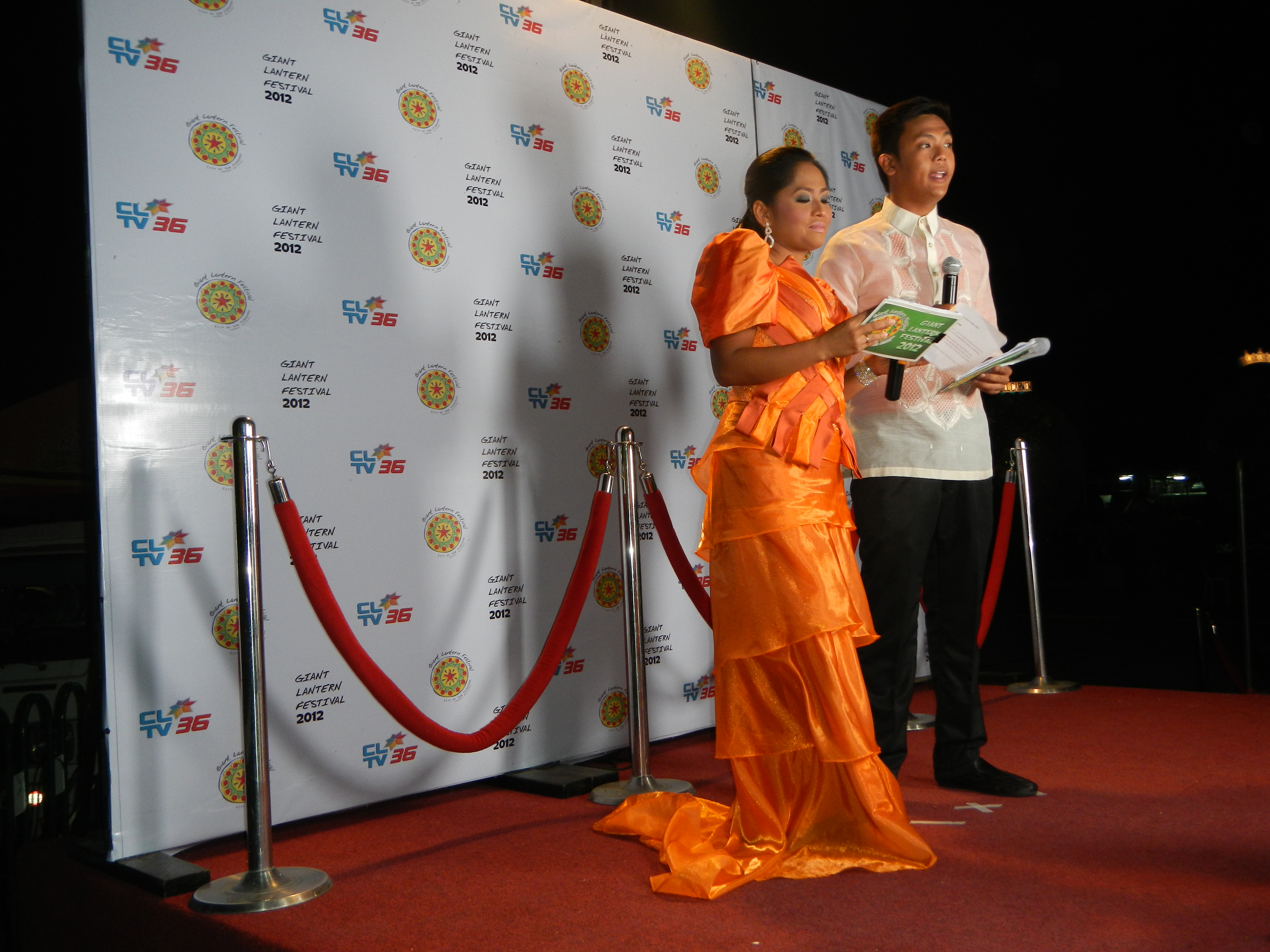
DWRW-DTV is the official broadcaster of the Giant Lantern Festival since 2007

=== News ===
- Balitaan CL (2026)

=== Current affairs ===
- Abak Na Balen! (2026)
- Alagang PhilHealth (2024)‡
- So to Speak with Sonia P. Soto (2024, new season)‡
- Talakayan Ngayon (2007–2012, 2025)
- UN in Action and Global Lens (2008)

=== Public service ===
- Pambansang Sumbungan: BITAG Help Desk (produced by Bitag Multimedia Network, 2023-2025, 2026; simulcast on IBC
- Fernandino Ka, Kayabe Ka! (2023)‡
- Kayabe V-Yahe (2023)‡
- The Interviewer with Boy Abunda (2024)‡

=== Infotainment ===
- AgriTV Central Luzon (2022; 2023)
- Clark In Focus (2016, 2017)
- COMMusta Central Luzon (2024)
- Discover Dubai
- Discover Japan (2017)
- Discover Taiwan
- Discover Thailand
- DokyuBata TV (2023)
- G? G! (2025)
- Luid Ka! (2024)‡
- Mise-En-Scene (2023)
- Spotlight (2024)
- Reimagined Podcast (2026)
- Youth Voice Matters (2024)‡

=== Religious ===
- CLTV 36 The 3–O'Clock Prayer (English version)
- GCF Pampanga Worship Service
- His Life TV
- Mama’s Boys (Mama Mary’s Boys)
- Men of Light (2007)
- St. Joseph the Worker Chapel II - Clark (English Mass) (2020)
- Holy Rosary Parish (Pisamban Maragul) (Kapampangan Mass) (2020)
- Sensei: Their Skills and Talents

=== Bilyonaryo News Channel programs ===
- Agenda (2026)
- Agenda Weekend (2026)
- Go Rampa with Me (2026)
- Memo with Korina Sanchez–Roxas (2026)
- On Point with Pinky Webb (2026)
- The Scorecard (2026)
- The Spokes (2026)
- Wellness is Wealth (2026)

‡Also streamed on Facebook.

^Also streamed on YouTube.

== Awards and recognition ==
In 2008, about a year since it began broadcasting, the station received its first KBP Golden Dove Award (Sonia Soto for Best Provincial Public Affairs Program Host). DWRW-DTV was again honored as the three-time Best Provincial TV station by the same award-giving body for the 2012, 2014 and 2015 editions, along with the award for their programs Balitang Central Luzon (Best TV Newscast, Provincial) and So To Speak (two-time Best TV Public Affairs Program, Provincial).

== Broadcast coverage ==
=== Primary areas ===
- Pampanga
- Bulacan

==== Secondary areas ====
- Parts of Bataan
- Parts of Tarlac
- Portion of Nueva Ecija
- Northern Portion of Metro Manila
- Portion of Rizal
- Portion of Zambales
- Portion of Cavite

== Technical information ==
Branding	Callsign	Channel #	Power	Station Type	Location
CLTV 36 HD	DWRW-DTV	36	2,500 watts (Low Power Transmission)	Originating (now migrated from analog to digital)	Corporate Guarantee Building, Jose Abad Santos Avenue, San Fernando, Pampanga. Central Luzon

DWRW-DTV programs are retransmitted nationally via pay television providers: numerous regional cable and satellite providers in Pampanga, Tarlac, Bulacan, Bataan, Nueva Ecija, and Zambales; as well as out-of-market cable access in Rizal, Laguna (including Santa Rosa and Calamba) and Cavite. In 2016, the station became available nationally via major satellite provider Cignal, making it a national superstation.

Programs are also livestreamed on its official website, Facebook, YouTube, and via its official application for iOS and Android users.

== Digital television ==
Channel	Video	Aspect	Short Name	Programming	Notes
36.01	1080i HDTV	16:9	CLTV 36 HD	Central Luzon Television (Main DWRW-DTV programming)	Fully migrated from analog to digital Low Power Transmission
36.02	RBC TEST BROADCAST	16:9	(Unnamed)	(Unnamed)	Test broadcast

Since September 10, 2023, DWRW-DTV has utilized its analog UHF channel 36 (605.143 MHz) for its digital terrestrial television (DTT) tests during off-air hours. It initially conducted its digital test broadcasts daily, except for Mondays and Wednesdays, from 07:30 pm to 10:00 pm.

=== Analog-to-digital conversion ===
DWRW-DTV made several announcements on its broadcast and social media pages about a change happening on October 10, 2023, the culmination of plans to convert the station to DTT which began in May 2021. The conversion was later moved to October 16, 2023 and began its regular test broadcast on digital from 07:00 pm to 10:00 pm. On December 1, 2023, CLTV 36 began broadcasting on digital as early as 12nn and has gone full-time digital broadcasting the whole day on December 7. The traditional analog TV broadcast permanently ended on December 6 at 12:00 PHT, after 16 years since its maiden broadcast of the station.

However, it is currently operating at 2,500 watts, as it is currently not viewable in other parts of Central Luzon, with later plans to upgrade the transmitter power output to expand the signal to the entire Central Luzon area, either through upgrade on the main transmitter and/or implementing SFN transmitters to different parts of the region, particularly every province of Central Luzon.

== See also ==
- RW 95.1 FM
