= Abante =

Filipino newspaper

- Una sa Balita

- August 7, 2024 front page issue
- Type: Daily newspaper
- Format: Tabloid
- Owner: Prage Management Corporation
- News editor: Jeane Lacorte; Jose Randy Hagos; Fernando Jadulco
- Founded: May 27, 1987; 39 years ago
- Language: Tagalog
- Headquarters: 60 P. Tuazon Boulevard, Barangay Kaunlaran, Cubao, Quezon City (main office); Fortunata Building 1, Vitalez Compound, Brgy. San Isidro, Sucat, Parañaque, Philippines (plant office)
- Country: Philippines
- Website: www.abante.com.ph

Abante (transl. Move forward) is a daily Filipino tabloid publication in the Philippines. Its offices are in Quezon City and Parañaque. It is owned by Prage Management Corporation, a media company owned by two veteran journalists who took over the management and operations of Abante and its sister tabloid, Abante Tonite, from Monica Publishing Corporation of the Macasaet family in October 2017.

Aside from Abante, Abante Tonite, and NewsKo, Prage Management Corporation also manage and operates Abante: TNT (Tunay na Tabloidista), a real-time online news website; its sister websites Bilyonaryo, Milyonaryo, Politiko, Fastbreak, Atletiko, Bankero and Abogado, Teletabloid; and two new ventures since 2024, Bilyonaryo News Channel and DWAR Abante 1494.

== Profile ==
Abante, founded on May 27, 1987, was first published by the Banahaw Publishing Corporation, owned by national artist Virgilio Almario. The tabloid was bought in 1988 by Amado Macasaet, chairman of Monica Publishing Corporation (MPC), whose son, Allen, became the company's president. At that time, MPC was already publishing a weekly magazine for students.

Abante is published every morning. On February 3, 1989, MPC began publishing Abante Tonite, its afternoon edition, with the elder Macasaet as its founder.

Abante targets mostly lower-income readers. Upon its success in circulation, it later reduced its most dubious content to reach more advertisers and readers, a strategy later adopted by other tabloids.

Its online platform was launched in 2006.

On September 9, 2019, four armed men burned the Abante Tonite printing house in Parañaque City. This was the first violent attack on the newspaper since its inception in 1987. The incident was condemned by the National Union of Journalists of the Philippines.

== Legal issues ==
Reportedly, Abante has won most of at least 50 libel cases; a few were settled out of court.

During the State of Emergency in 2006, operatives from the Criminal Investigation and Detection Group tried to raid Abante's office but withdrew when they saw that there were television crews in the area.

== Media ventures ==
In 2019, Abante launched its own "teleradyo" digital platform Abante Radyo Tabloidista. It was available via internet radio and YouTube.

On October 10, 2022, Abante launched an online morning newscast called Abante Teletabloid, and public service show, I-Abante Mo!, both shown on the tabloid's social media accounts.

On July 8, 2024, Abante established a standalone radio station (replacing Radyo Tabloidista) and entered a partnership with FBS Radio Network (through Supreme Broadcasting System) to air Abante Radyo (renamed as simply Abante) through its current frequency, 1494 KHz. Subsequently, the TeleTabloid brand was turned into a "teleradyo"-like cable news channel simulcasting its radio counterpart.
