= Bilyonaryo =

Filipino business news website

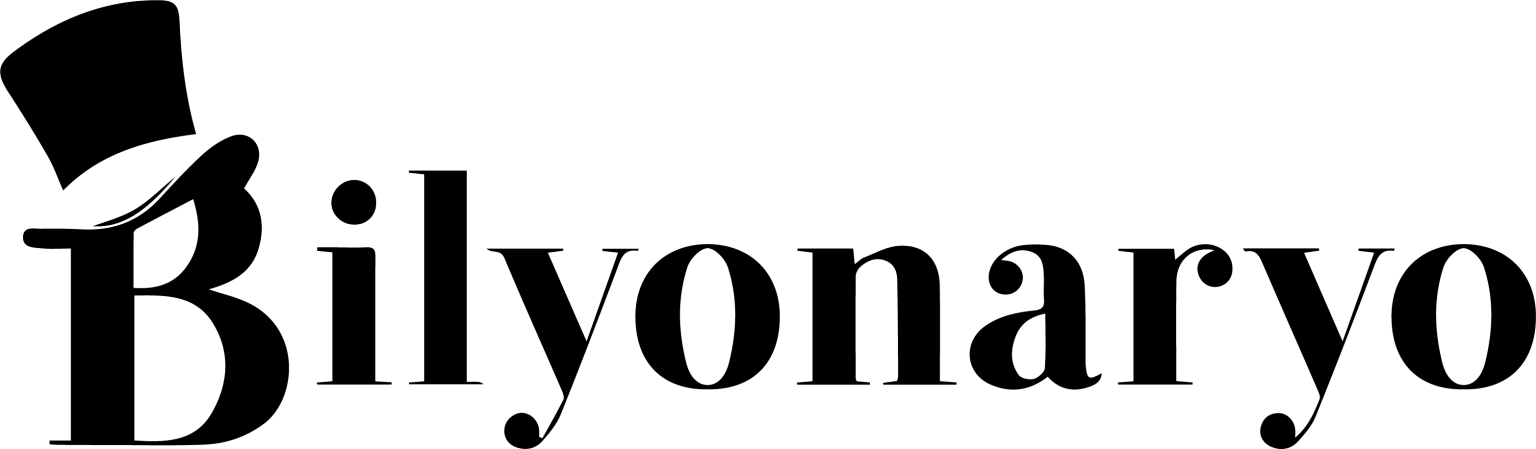

- Website type: Online news website (finance)
- Owner: Prage Management Corporation
- Website: bilyonaryo.com
- Launched: November 23, 2015; 10 years ago
- Current status: Online

Bilyonaryo (transl. billionaire) is a digital news website owned by Prage Management Corporation. The website primarily produces news articles related to business and finance.

== History ==
It was founded on November 23, 2015 by former Philippine Daily Inquirer senior reporter Gil Cabacungan, Jr., to highlight billionaires and their presence in the business sector. Prage took over the website in 2021.

In 2022, Bilyonaryo made its first venture outside of its core website with the weekly TV program Usapang Bilyonaryo. In 2024, Prage launched its own digital channel Bilyonaryo News Channel.
