= Mornings @ ANC =

- The final title card of Mornings @ ANC used from 2015 to 2017
- Genre: News program Talk show
- Developed by: ABS-CBN News
- Presented by: Paolo Abrera; David Celdran; Ginger Conejero; Gigi Grande; Christian Esguerra
- Country of origin: Philippines
- Original language: English

Production
- Camera setup: Multiple-camera setup
- Running time: 150 minutes

Original release
- Network: ANC
- Release: July 3, 2006 – February 24, 2017

Mornings @ ANC is a Philippine television news broadcasting show broadcast by ANC. Ricky Carandang, Marieton Pacheco, TJ Manotoc and Niña Corpuz, it aired from July 3, 2006 to February 24, 2017, replacing Breakfast and was replaced by Early Edition. Paolo Abrera, David Celdran, Ginger Conejero, Gigi Grande and Christian Esguerra serve as the final hosts. It features all the information needed, ranging from news, both local and around the world, technology, sports, health, environment and entertainment news, along with the latest trends affecting Filipinos here and abroad. It aired on weekdays from 5:30 am to 8:00 am (PST).

== History ==
The program was first aired On July 3, 2006 as part of the re-branding of ANC. as one of the new shows unveiled by ABS-CBN and ANC along with Bandila., originally anchored by Ricky Carandang, Marieton Pacheco, TJ Manotoc and Niña Corpuz. It was started as a 2 1/2-hour program aired right after Magandang Umaga Pilipinas (then replaced by Umagang Kay Ganda) after Corpuz left then, she was replaced by Gretchen Fullido thereafter.

In 2008, the original 2 1/2-hour runtime of the show was reduced to 2 hours. Ron Cruz joined the show replacing Carandang, when the latter was moved to anchor News at 8. Meanwhile, Fullido was replaced by beauty queen turned entertainment reporter Ginger Conejero.

Former ABS-CBN Australia Bureau chief Gigi Grande joined the group and replaced Pacheco who marks her last day with the show on July 17, 2009, to embark a new life with her family in Canada and was assigned to be ABS-CBN North America Bureau correspondent.

In 2010, TJ Manotoc left the show to join Ces Oreña-Drilon for ABS-CBN News Channel's new primetime newscast The Rundown, he was replaced by equally sports enthusiast and broadcaster Paolo Abrera who joins Ginger Conejero, Ron Cruz, and Gigi Grande in the show, to take over the sports and technology beats and get to push his advocacy for nature in the all-new "Going Green" segment.

Broadcast journalist Pinky Webb, who used to anchor Dateline Philippines officially joined Mornings @ ANC on October 10, 2011, as she switched places with veteran broadcast journalist Gigi Grande. Grande joined TJ Manotoc on Dateline Philippines, the ANC's longest running newscast.

In August 2014, TJ Manotoc made his comeback to Mornings @ ANC, and replaced longtime anchor Ron Cruz, who will be taking over the anchor chair of the noontime newscast Dateline Philippines opposite Karmina Constantino. Eventually, Ron Cruz returned shortly when Manotoc was sent in the United States to cover the NBA Finals of that same year.

In April 2015, former NCAA & PBA courtside reporter and Myx VJ Ai dela Cruz replaced long time host Ginger Conejero.

Seasoned ABS-CBN News anchor Pinky Webb resigned from her post to join the newly launched CNN Philippines as reported which is known to be headed by Jing Magsaysay, one of her former colleagues in ABS-CBN News Channel. She was temporarily replaced by Karmina Constantino and one of the show's original host Niña Corpuz.

After Corpuz short stint as main anchor and host, veteran business news journalist Nancy Irlanda formally rejoined the network on June 15, 2015, via the morning show Mornings @ ANC and served as permanent replacement of Pinky Webb.

Following the revamp on programming and the logo of ANC on October 26, 2015, the morning show moves to an earlier timeslot (5:30 am – 8:00 am) replacing the channel's simulcast of Umagang Kay Ganda from sister station ABS-CBN from 5:30 am to 7:30 am. and the replay of On the Money from 7:30 am to 8:00 am. It also moved their studios to 8 Rockwell Building, Rockwell Center in Makati (Rockwell Center is a property operated by the Lopez Holdings Corporation, the ultimate parent of ANC and ABS-CBN) with the revamp, newer hosts were added, including the return of Ginger Conejero after leaving the show for just 6 months in April 2015. The former timeslot from 9:00 am to 11:00 am are now being replaced with the morning edition of Market Edge with Cathy Yang, News Now and On the Money.

The show aired its final broadcast on February 24, 2017, and was replaced by a new morning show Early Edition on February 27, 2017.

== Final hosts ==
- Paolo Abrera
- David Celdran
- Ginger Conejero
- Gigi Grande
- Christian Esguerra

== Former hosts ==
- Ai dela Cruz
- Edric Mendoza
- Ricky Carandang
- Ron Cruz
- Gretchen Ho
- Marieton Pacheco
- Niña Corpuz
- Nancy Irlanda
- Gretchen Fullido
- TJ Manotoc
- Pinky Webb

== See also ==
- List of programs broadcast by the ABS-CBN News Channel
