= List of programs broadcast by the ABS-CBN News Channel =

The following is a list of programs broadcast by the ABS-CBN News Channel. The channel primarily broadcasts programming relating to news, business, politics, and public affairs, along with other magazine religious and documentary-style programs. The network also airs programming sourced from ABS-CBN, ABS-CBN Regional, Kapamilya Channel, DZMM TeleRadyo, Jeepney TV, Metro Channel and The Filipino Channel.

== Current programs ==
=== News ===
- ANC Breaking News (2001–present)
- ANC Headlines (1999–2024, 2026–present)
- ANC Live (2001–present)
- ANC Presents (2007–present)
- Dateline Philippines (1996–present)
- Top Story (2002–present)
- The World Tonight (delayed telecast on Kapamilya Channel and All TV) (1996–present)
- TV Patrol (simulcast on A2Z, All TV, DZMM Radyo Patrol 630, DZMM TeleRadyo, Kapamilya Channel and PRTV Prime Media) (2020–present)
  - TV Patrol Express (2024–present)
  - TV Patrol Weekend (2020–present)

=== Business ===
- Business Outlook (2023–present)
- Market Edge (2015–present)
- Start-up with Ron Cruz (2026–present)

=== Talk ===
- Banker After Dark (2024–present)
- Beyond the Exchange with Rico Hizon (2024–present)
- Headstart with Karen Davila (2010–present)
  - Hot Copy (2010–present)
- Matteo G Primetime (2026–present)
- The Boardroom with Salve Ibañez (2026–present)

=== Documentary/specials ===
- ANC Documentary Hour (2015–present)
- ANC Halloween Special (2024–present)
- ANC Presents Succession (2026–present)

=== Lifestyle ===
- At the Table (2018–present)
- Booze Traveler (2018–present) (also broadcast on Travel TV)
- Chasing Flavors with Claude Tayag (2018–present)
- Executive Class (2005–present)
- Graceful Living (2016–present)
- Modern Living TV (2014–present)
- Next in Line (2026–present)
- Philippine Reality TV (2008–present)
- State of the Art (2018–present)
- Show Me the Market (2018–present)
- The Art Show (2018–present)
- The Wine Show (2018–present)

=== Travel ===
- #BecomingFilipino: Your Travel Blog (2016–present)
- Asian Air Safari (2006–present)

=== Religious ===
- The Word Exposed with Luis Antonio Cardinal Tagle (2011–present) (also aired on Bilyonaryo News Channel, TV Maria and SolarFlix) (Produced by Jesuit Communications)

=== Television programs from TFC ===
- Juan Conversations (2026–present)
- TFC News: Europe & Middle East (2018–present)

=== Television programs from Metro Channel ===
- Casa Daza (also broadcast/aired on Metro Channel)
- Dreamcatchers (also broadcast/aired on Metro Channel)
- Metro Home (also broadcast/aired on Metro Channel)

== Previously aired programs ==
- #NoFilter (2016, 2019–2020)
- ABS-CBN Headlines (2000–2003)
- ABS-CBN Insider (2003–2006)
- ABS-CBN Weekend News (2001–2005)
- Adobo Nation (2008–2021)
- Ako Ang Simula (2011–2013)
- Alas Singko Y Medya Weekend (2000–2002)
- ANC Chat
- ANC Documentaries
- ANC Early Edition
- ANC First
- ANC Health
- ANC Life
- ANC Money
- ANC News First
- ANC Newsnight
- ANC Perspective
- ANC Presents (2010–2020)
- ANC Primetime News (1999–2004)
- ANC Rundown (2019–2024)
- ANC Today
- Arroyo Presidency
- Arts.21 (2023–2026)
- Assignment (1996–2001)
- After the Fact (2021–2022)
- Ako Ang Simula (2011–2013)
- At the Moment (2022–2025)
- Balita Via Satellite
- Balitang America (2002–2021)
- Balitang Australia
- Balitang Canada (2012–2015)
- Balitang Europe
- Balitang Middle East
- Bandila (2006–2020)
- Barangay Dos
- Belo Beauty 101
- Business Nightly (2000–2020)
- Business Roadshow (2023–2024)
- Beyond Politics with Lynda Jumilla (2013–2019)
- Breakfast (1999–2001)
- By Demand
- Cable News Asia
- Cash Flow sourced from CNBC Asia (2007–2016)
- CBS Evening News. With Dan Rather (1996–2005)
- CBS Evening News. With Bob Schieffer (2005–2006)
- CBS Evening News. With Katie Couric (2006–2011)
- CBS Evening News. Weekend Edition (2006–2010)
- CHInoyTV (2017–2020)
- Chinatown News TV (2021)
- Citizen Pinoy (2005–2023)
- Coffee Talk with Cherie Mercado (2001–2003)
- Computer Chronicles
- Crossing Borders
- Crossroads (2006–2010)
- Cityscape/Cityscape Passport (2009–2022)
- Dateline Philippines Saturday (1996–2024)
- Dateline Philippines Sunday (1996–2020)
- Dayaw (2015–2021)
- DCS: The Dyan Castillejo Show
- Dispatch
- DZMM Live
- DZMM TeleRadyo on ANC (during the COVID-19 pandemic) (2020)
- Early Edition (2017–2020)
- Eye On Your Week
- F! (1999–2003)
- Failon Ngayon (2009–2020)
- First Lady ng Masa
- First Look (2006–2015)
- Frank Debate
- Frankly Speaking
- Future Perfect (2010–2020)
- Galing Pook (2013–2020)
- Game Na
- Gametime (2017–2020)
- GameZone
- Generation RX
- Global 3000 (2023–2024)
- Global Links
- Global News (2001–2003)
- Global Us (2023–2026)
- Good Morning Philippines
- Green Living (2011–2020)
- Hardball (2006–2019)
- Health Matters (2014–2015)
- I Survived: Hindi Sumusuko Ang Pinoy (2009–2010)
- iMO: In My Opinion
- In Good Shape (2023–2026)
- Inside Business with Coco Alcuaz (2012–2016)
- Insight with April Lee Tan (2020–2024)
- Interaction
- Isyu 101 (2000–2002)
- Impact Challenge (2026)
- Jeep ni Erap
- Juan EU Konek (2014–2016)
- Julie (1997–2001)
- Kamusta Kabayan
- Kerygma TV (2010–2020)
- Kiddopreneur (2014–2015)
- Korina Today (2006–2009)
- Knowledge Power (1996–2004)
- Kwentong Disyerto
- Krusada (2010–2013)
- Legal Action
- Lehrer News Hour sourced from VOA (1998–2007)
- Life Without Borders with Cory Quirino
- Living with Health
- Local Legends (2019–2020)
- LSS: The Martin Nievera Show (2018–2024)
- Mabuhay OFW
- Made in Germany (2024–2026)
- Magandang Gabi... Bayan (1996–2005)
- Magandang Umaga, Bayan (2002–2005)
- Magandang Umaga, Pilipinas (2005–2007)
- Mornings @ ANC (2006–2017)
- Mukha (2014–2019)
- Managing Asia (2007–2016)
- Margie on Mindanao
- Market Review
- Matters of Fact on Early Edition (2017–2021)
- MBA Games
- Media in Focus (2006–2010)
- MindaNow
- Mission X (2001–2003)
- Mukha (2014–2019)
- My Favorite Show
- My Home
- My Travel Blog
- National Arts
- Net Café
- Newshour sourced from Al Jazeera English (2007–2012)
- News @ 8 with Ricky Carandang
- News @ 8 with Ron Cruz
- News Central (1998–2010)
- News Clock
- News Live
- News Now (2012–2019)
- News Patrol (2024–2026)
- News Update
- NorthBound (2015–2016)
- Off the Record (2001–2003)
- On Cue (2024–2026)
- On Line
- On The Money (2012–2020)
- On the Scene
- Open House
- OBG Talk (2016)
- Patrol ng Pilipino (2010–2013)
- People Count
- Philippine Times
- Pipol (2001–2006)
- Pipol on ANC (2011–2014)
- Pointblank
- Points of View
- Prime News (2006–2013)
- Prime News Weekend (2006–2013)
- Primetime on ANC (2011–2015)
- Primetime on ANC Weekend (2013–2015)
- Private Conversations with Boy Abunda (2000–2006)
- Private I (2003–2005)
- Probe (2005–2009)
- Probe Profiles (2009–2010)
- Pulso: Aksyon Balita (1999–2000)
- Rev (2017–2020)
- Rubi on a Roadtrip
- Rated K (2004–2018)
- Rev+ (2017–2026)
- S.O.C.O.: Scene of the Crime Operatives (2005–2011)
- Sarimanok Network News (1996–1999)
- Shake with Nancy Irlanda (2015–2016)
- SNN Business Desk
- SNN Dateline News
- SNN International Desk
- SNN Kapihan
- SNN Midday Report
- SNN Newscenter
- SNN Primetime
- SNN Primetime News
- SNN Sports MTV
- SNN Sportscenter
- SNN Weather Report
- Space Tech
- Special Assignment
- Sports Machine
- Sports Patrol
- Sports U (2015–2018)
- Sports Unlimited (1997–2015)
- Square Off (2006–2020)
- Start-Up
- Stock Market Live
- Street Signs (2014–2016)
- Straight Talk (2001–2007)
- Strictly Politics (2000–2011)
- Shop Talk (2006–2019)
- Storyline (2008–2015)
- Swak na Swak (2020–2021)
- Take One
- Talkback (2000–2020)
- Tamano Perspective (2011–2012)
- Tease
- TeleRadyo on ANC (due to telecast of Typhoons Rolly and Ulysses strikes the Philippines) (2020)
- Tell the People (2001)
- Tell The People Now
- The A List (2025–2026)
- The Big Picture (2006–2008)
- The Boss (2016–2020)
- The Bottomline with Boy Abunda (2009–2020)
- The Brew
- The Bureau (2012–2019)
  - The Bureau at 4pm (2012–2019)
  - The Bureau at 7pm (2017–2019)
- The Correspondents (1998–2010)
- The Erap Presidency
- The Explainer (2006–2010)
- The Explainer Dialogues
- The Good Life with Cory Quirino
- The Quantum Channel (1996–1999)
- The Rundown (2010–2011)
- The Shop
- The Strip
- The Weekend News (1996–2001)
- The World Tonight Weekend (Saturday edition; 1999–2024, Sunday edition; 1999–2020)
- The World Live Earth TV (2005–2012)
- Thumbs Up! (2014–2015)
- Tina Monzon Palma Reports (2021–2022)
- Tomorrow Today (2023–2026)
- Tonight on ANC with Korina Sanchez
- Top Story Saturday (2002–2024)
- Top Story Sunday (2002–2020)
- Travel Time (2007–2015)
- Trending with Kelly (2017–2021)
- Trending Now with Kelly Misa (2014–2017)
- Trippers
- True Crime (2001–2002)
- Umagang Kay Ganda (2007–2015)
- Verum EST: Totoo Ba Ito? (2001)
- View from the Top
- Viewpoints
- VOA This Week sourced from VOA (1998–2007)
- Week in Review
- Weekend Report
- XXX: Exklusibong, Explosibong, Exposé (2006–2013)
- XYZ

== See also ==
- ABS-CBN News Channel
- A2Z
- All TV
- List of programs broadcast by ABS-CBN
