= Protest music against the Marcos dictatorship =

The different forms and trends of protest music against the Marcos dictatorship mostly first became prominent during the period now known as the First Quarter Storm, and continued until Ferdinand Marcos was deposed during the 1986 People Power revolution; some of the trends continued beyond this period either in commemoration of the struggle against the Marcos dictatorship, or in opposition to the political return of the Marcos family to a prominent place in Philippine politics.

== Music of the First Quarter Storm ==
Music protesting the policies and actions of Ferdinand Marcos' administration mostly first became prominent during the First Quarter Storm, a period of social unrest during the first three months of 1970 when Ferdinand Marcos' debt-driven spending triggered the 1969 Philippine balance of payments crisis and subsequently, a series of student-led protests.

At the time, mainstream music in the Philippines had not yet seen the rise of the later trends Pinoy rock, Pinoy jazz, and the Pinoy pop which would be referred to as the "Manila sound", so the protest music of this period was mostly the music of the picket lines, university campuses, and what activists then referred to as "the parliament of the streets".

Among the most prominent protest songwriters of this period were Jess Santiago and Heber Bartolome, who continued to create and perform their protest songs through the days of Martial Law and beyond.

== Music of the resistance movement during Martial law ==
The imposition of martial law in 1979 led to strict government controls over cultural performances and all forms of media. So while artists like Jess Santiago and Heber Bartolome continued writing protest songs, these mostly could not be performed until the late 1970s when international scrutiny and local conditions forced Marcos to loosen the reins somewhat. Many of the underground movement's songs from the first three or four years of Martial Law were never documented, and are now only either recorded orally, or rescued in academic efforts to preserve the history of the era.

Among the first songs from this period to be written down and preserved were those composed by University of the Philippines student organization the UPLB Tulisanes, founded by students Wency Olaguer, Bayani Espiritu, Virgilio “Siokoy” Rojas, Lynn Martinez, Pedro "Bornix” Abad, and Dennis “Tengo” Alegre. The group was able to sing their songs in public because they only did so in small jam sessions within the relative freedom offered to them by the UPLB campus. They thus had the freedom to discuss the human rights abuses of the Marcos dictatorship and the specific cases of the UPLB students such as those of the Southern Tagalog 10 who had become desaparacidos.

Also documented were the songs attached to cultural performances such as musicals and plays. A prominent example were the songs in Boni Ilagan's play "Pagsambang Bayan", first staged by the University of the Philippines Repertory Company in September 1977 under director Behn Cervantes and musical director Susan Tagle, who were promptly arrested for staging it.

Those who organized strikes, rallies, and other protest actions often invited the cultural group Tambisan sa Sining, whose performances included musical pieces by Tambisan co-founder Napoleon Abiog (who often used the nom de guerre Benjie Torralba), who would become the group's chair after Marcos was deposed. Another group prominent on the picket lines was the female duo of Karina Constantino-David and Becky Demetillo Abraham, who formed the band Inang Laya, and became well known for their adaptation of the Andres Bonifacio song Pag-ibig sa Tinubuang Lupa.

Among the thousands of political detainees under the Marcos dictatorship, musically oriented individuals such as Aloysius Baes composed songs while in prison, which were then learned and sung by fellow prisoners and then got passed on to the outside world once detainees were released.

== Social consciousness in martial law era popular music ==
Because of censorship, access to protest music was severely limited for those who were not part of the active resistance movement against Marcos, even as Filipino musicians' desire to adapt new western music genres to Filipino sensibilities gave rise to new modes of musical expression, notably Pinoy pop, Pinoy rock, Filipino folk rock, Pinoy jazz, and later the pop genre which became known as the "Manila sound".

On the other hand, Marcos made extensive use of music as propaganda, promoting an interpretation of nationalism which supported his ideology of "constitutional authoritarianism."

Despite heavy censorship, artists found ways to counter Marcos' propaganda, and talk about the social ills brought about by the excesses of Marcos dictatorship - although often only indirectly.

The rise of Folk Rock in the 1970s meant that its local expression, Filipino folk rock, was inherently full of social commentary. For example, Mike Pillora Jr., Cesar Bañares Jr., and Lolita Carbon did not aim to be political when they formed Asin, but the socially relevant themes of their songs such as "Balita" and "Masdan mo ang Kapaligiran" led their records to sometimes be confiscated by authorities, and at other times for the band to be invited to play at official events.

Performing in clubs, Pinoy Rock musicians had more opportunities for social commentary than pop musicians whose songs had to be acceptable for play on the radio; in 1979, activist-poet-musician Chickoy Pura gathered Olongapo-based musicians Nitoy Adriano, Hely Umali, Boy Matriano, Flor Mendoza and Gils Dauag together to form The Jerks, one of the country's earliest blues and punk bands, whose lyrics were full of anti-authoritarian social commentary in the same way that British punk was at the time.

In more radio-friendly fare, there were also songs that had lyrics which, while not clearly references to the administration, could and were often interpreted as such. These include Pilita Corrales' "Ang Pipit" (lit. "The Little Songbird"), whose slain titular bird cries out "Mamang kay lupit, ang puso mo’y di na nahabag" ("Cruel man, your heart feels no pity!"); and Celeste Legaspi's seemingly-cheerful lullabye "Saranggola ni Pepe" (Pepe's kite), which refers to a "matandang bingi" (an old deaf man) which could be interpreted as Ferdinand Marcos, and whose lyrics could be interpreted to be descriptions of various social ills and abuses of the authoritarian government, concluding with the line "Sumusuway sa utos, puso'y sinusunod" (disobeying orders, the heart will follow). The 1973 Jose Mari Chan single "Mr. Songwriter" – which later formed the basis for the better-known Celeste Legaspi song "Mamang Sorbetero" – ostensibly reads as a call for peace among nations amid the backdrop of the Cold War, but was later confirmed in an interview with Chan to be a veiled protest against the Marcos regime who seized the Chan family's sugar plantation at the time.

== Music of the People Power revolution ==
=== Bayan Ko ===
"Bayan Ko", the patriotic kundiman written in the 1920s, was deemed seditious through the earliest years of the Marcos regime; public performances of the song were banned, with violators facing potential arrest and detention. Circumstances changed after the 1983 Assassination of Ninoy Aquino, however, as public anger against the Marcos dictatorship erupted, leading to the weekly protest rallies attended by both the masses and the middle class, and the increasing participation of previously silent groups such as businesses and churches. In particular, a public singing of "Bayan Ko" was led by folk singer Freddie Aguilar at Aquino's massively-attended funeral, making Aguilar's recording of the song (international pressure had loosened censorship somewhat by then) an instant hit as a protest anthem.

Another old song which was spontaneously appropriated as a protest anthem was the 1970s American folk rock ditty "Tie a Yellow Ribbon Round the Ole Oak Tree," which had been a reference to the return of American prisoners of war, but which was now adapted to refer to Political detainees under the Marcos dictatorship, such as Aquino himself. Yet another was the Ramon Magsaysay campaign jingle "Mambo Magsaysay", which warned Filipinos that "our democracy will die" if a new democratic leader is not put in place. Yet another phenomenon of this shift in public attention was the appropriation of church music for use in the context of protest.

=== Church music and the People Power revolution ===
As the last three years of the Marcos dictatorship led inevitably to the People Power revolution, there was enough information about the dictatorship's abuses and enough awareness in churches about the social ills of the time that church music could come to be spontaneously used to spur on resistance against the dictatorship and against authoritarianism in general. Most prominently, during the three days of the active phase of the People Power revolution, the 19th-century English hymn Onward, Christian Soldiers came to be used as a call for the Soldiers to side with the people, instead of the protesters.

The quickly-put-together Evangelical alliance Konsensiya ng Febrero Siete (KONFES), mostly made up of Theologian Isabelo Magalit's Diliman Bible Church congregation and social scientist Melba Padilla Maggay's Institute for Studies in Asian Church and Culture (ISACC) brought their hymnals and loudly sang their hymns the barricades at Gate 2 of Camp Aguinaldo, which the Marcos military had identified as an entry point for storming the camp.

Elsewhere, the largely Catholic EDSA crowd - encouraged to join the protest by Manila Archbishop Jaime Cardinal Sin, erupted in occasional renditions of "Ave Maria", "Our Father", and various other songs.

=== Handog ng Pilipino sa Mundo ===
In the weeks and months following the ouster of the Marcos family from power, various songs celebrating the People Power revolution came out. Just a few days after the Marcoses were removed from power, composer Tito Sotto, who had popularly been associated with Marcos, wrote and released "Magkaisa" (lit. "Unite as one") was released, as a general call for Filipinos to reconcile with one another despite their differences.

A few weeks later, a supergroup composed of 15 Filipino artists released Handog ng Pilipino sa Mundo (lit. "Offering of the Filipino to the World," and released with the English title of "A New and Better Way—The People's Anthem"), which commemorated specifics of the event, with lyrics saying:

Masdan ang nagaganap sa aming bayan / Nagkasama ang mahirap at mayaman / Kapit-bisig madre pari at sundalo / Naging Langit itong bahagi ng mundo. (Look at what is happening in our country/the rich and poor came together/ linked arms, the nun, the priest, and the soldier/ this part of the world had become heaven)

The lyrics of the song are inscribed on a wall of Our Lady of EDSA Shrine, one of the three monuments which would be built to commemorate Martial Law and the People Power revolution.

== Prominent artists and groups ==
- Jess Santiago
- Heber Bartolome
- Paul Galang
- Inang Laya (Becky Demetillo Abraham and Karina Constantino David)
- Asin (band) (Mike Pillora Jr., Cesar Bañares Jr., and Lolita Carbon)
- The Jerks
- Noel Cabangon
- Freddie Aguilar
- Celeste Legaspi
- APO Hiking Society
- Diliman Bible Church
- Buklod

=== Individuals honored at the Bantayog ng mga Bayani ===
- Napoleon Abiog (1953 - 2015, often credited as Benjie Torralba or various other pseudonyms) - co-founder and musical director of the cultural group Tambisan sa Sining, which became well known for staging performances during various protest actions. Also co-founded the grassroots-based cultural center Bugkos, became national chair of newly formed Makabayang Alyansa Sa Sining Anakpawis, and became part of the Amado V. Hernandez Resource Center, aside from supporting the formation of various local cultural groups at the city or municipal level. Honored by having his name inscribed on the wall of remembrance of the Bantayog ng mga Bayani in 2019.
- Aloysius Baes - best known for his environmental activism after the Marcos dictatorship, had earlier composed a series of songs while a political detainee, which became so popular and influential among fellow detainees that they came to be called the 'top hits of martial law.'

== See also ==
- Timeline of the Marcos dictatorship
- Human rights abuses of the Marcos dictatorship
- Political detainees under the Marcos dictatorship
