= Dateline Philippines =

- Title card used since October 26, 2015
- Genre: News program
- Created by: ABS-CBN Corporation
- Developed by: ABS-CBN News and Current Affairs
- Presented by: Karmina Constantino
- Country of origin: Philippines
- Original language: English
- No. of episodes: n/a (airs daily)

Production
- Running time: 1 hour

Original release
- Network: Sarimanok News Network (now ANC)
- Release: July 8, 1996 – present

Dateline Philippines is the flagship midday television newscast of the ABS-CBN News Channel (ANC) covering the day's most important headlines in politics, business, sports, and entertainment. It concentrates on news from the more than 7,000 islands of the Philippines as reported by ABS-CBN News, the largest news organization in the country.

It is remarkable for being ABS-CBN's longest-running national newscast that originated on cable and was produced by Sarimanok News Network (now ABS-CBN News Channel). It debuted on July 8, 1996, and was originally hosted by Frankie Evangelista, Gene Orejana, and Joyce Burton-Titular. Karmina Constantino currently serves as the host.

The show now airs from 12:00 NN to 1:00 PM (PST) on weekdays.

== COVID-19 pandemic and ABS-CBN shutdown ==
The Sunday edition of Dateline Philippines was no longer produced on March 22, 2020, as a result of the implementation of an enhanced community quarantine to help stop the COVID-19 pandemic in the Philippines.

Furthermore, with ABS-CBN shutting down free-to-air operations due to the expiration of its legislative franchise and in compliance with the NTC's cease and desist order, the current status of the said edition remained unknown until it was eventually cancelled as a result of the network's shutdown and permanent loss of broadcast franchise followed by the company's retrenchment layoffs. Dateline Philippines Sunday was then replaced by provisional programming on the same date.

Dateline Philippines Weekday and Saturday editions resumed on air in full scale on April 26, 2020, when the timesharing of programming between both DZMM TeleRadyo and ANC ended.

Dateline Philippines Weekend aired its final episode on November 30, 2024, along with other Saturday newscasts produced by the channel. This follows ABS-CBN’s announcement of further job cuts, including layoffs of reporters and cameramen. The network cited financial difficulties due to declining advertising revenue as the reason for these measures.

== Anchors ==
- Karmina Constantino

=== Segment host ===
- Michelle Ong

=== Substitute ===
- Stanley Palisada
- Denice Dinsay
- Vivienne Gulla
- Katrina Domingo
- Michelle Ong
- Bettina Magsaysay
- Pia Gutierrez
- Migs Bustos

=== Previous anchors and segment presenters ===
- Frankie Evangelista
- Joyce Burton-Titular
- Kathy San Gabriel
- Gene Orejana
- Harry Gasser (segment presenter from ABS-CBN Cebu)
- Ron Cruz
- Gigi Grande
- TJ Manotoc
- Primy Cane (segment presenter from ABS-CBN Cagayan de Oro)
- Ryan Gamboa (segment presenter from ABS-CBN Bacolod)
- Gretchen Fullido (showbiz and weather segment presenter)
- Ricky Carandang
- Mari Kaimo
- Erwin Tulfo
- Pinky Webb
- Tony Velasquez
- Caroline Howard
- Alvin Elchico
- Boyet Sison ("Hardball" segment presenter)
- Raine Musñgi
- Rica Lazo

== See also ==
- List of programs broadcast by the ABS-CBN News Channel
- ABS-CBN News Channel
- ABS-CBN News and Current Affairs
