= Breakfast (Philippine TV program) =

Philippine TV program

- Genre: News; Live action
- Created by: ABS-CBN Corporation
- Developed by: ABS-CBN News and Current Affairs
- Directed by: Carrie Jose; Arnel Jacobe
- Presented by: Atom Araullo; Bam Aquino; JC Cuadrado; Patty Laurel; Asia Agcaoili
- Country of origin: Philippines
- Original language: English

Production
- Camera setup: Multiple-camera setup
- Running time: 90 minutes

Original release
- Network: ANC (1999–2001); Studio 23 (1999–2007)
- Release: March 15, 1999 – June 22, 2007

Breakfast is a Philippine television news broadcasting and talk show broadcast by Studio 23 and ANC. It was originally hosted by David Celdran, Techie Severino, Jess Liwanag, Lia Andanar Yu, Billy Aniceto, Angel Rivero, Mitzi Borromeo, Mico Halili, Karmina Constantino, and JC Gonzalez. It aired from March 15, 1999, to June 22, 2007. Atom Araullo, Bam Aquino, Patty Laurel, Asia Agcaoili, and JC Cuadrado served as the final hosts. It was also the morning show for the Filipino youth.

== Daily segments ==
Quick News
News for the youth, delivered fresh and fast (topics divided into: top news for the day, showbiz, sports, and human interest)
Served Hot
Live interview of the most controversial personalities on the hottest topic of the day
ATOMic Kitchen
Atom Araullo prepares, easy-to-prepare meals done in a minute or two
Fab Fix
A dose of beauty tips, fashion advice, and guide for healthy living
B(reakfast) List
A must see for the Pinoy youth who wants to experience it all despite the tight budget, a feature on the best finds and buys all over the metro.
On the Road
Traffic updates and road tips for safe and speedy driving
Daily Dose
Time for the hosts to speak up and share their personal thoughts and experiences o
Get a Job
Job openings for the job-seeking Filipino youth
Daily Specials
Interview of the live guest band/performer for the day
School Buzz
School events and activities in Tokyo
Early Bird Question
A host asks a question. And a caller or texter will win prizes

== Weekly segments ==
Moneymaking Monday
About business
Whose Day Tuesday
Showing well-renowned personalities in sports, and arts
Wednesdays Worth Watching
Reviews movies that are now showing. Plus behind the scenes of movies.
Techie Thursday
Showing the latest gadgets, websites and more. Giving tips how to create a blog or website
Fab Friday
Shows fashions and style
Shifting gears
Your law

== Hosts ==
=== Final hosts ===
- Patty Laurel
- JC Cuadrado
- Atom Araullo
- Asia Agcaoili
- Bam Aquino

=== Former ===
- Ryan Agoncillo
- Bianca Gonzalez
- Bam Aquino
- JC Gonzalez
- Nikki Gil
- Mariel Rodriguez
- Joaqui Valdez
- Pia Arcangel
- Ria Tanjuatco-Trillo
- Patricia Evangelista
- Angel Rivero
- Marieton Pacheco
- Juddha Paolo
- Lia Andanar Yu
- Billy Aniceto
- Mitzi Borromeo
- Karmina Constantino
- Mico Halili

== After Breakfast morning show ==
After the cancellation of the morning program, the hosts moved to other television and radio programs:

Patty Laurel still teaches in pre-school.

JC Cuadrado is now inactive in showbiz, now currently migrated to the U.S. In 2014

Atom Araullo is formerly a news reporter on ABS-CBN 2 and also hosted a morning program, Umagang Kay Ganda, and also he hosted Hiwaga and now he is seen on public service program of the network Red Alert, which is part of Pinoy True Stories. In 2017, he went back to GMA Network in 2019 and now currently as a news anchor of State of the Nation on GTV 27 & Also a TV host of award winning documentary programs The Atom Araullo Documentaries & the longest running docu program I-Witness both Aired on GMA 7.

Asia Agcaoili quit show business and her last TV appearance was iPBA aired on ABC 5 in 2007, and Asia is now married.

Ryan Agoncillo is now host on the longest running variety noontime show Eat Bulaga! formerly on GMA 7 & currently seen on TV5 and game show Picture! Picture! and his sitcom Ismol Family on GMA 7, and also hosted a talent program Talentadong Pinoy and also Bangon Talentadong Pinoy on TV5, and also a movie actor on the films Kasal, Kasali, Kasalo, Sakal, Sakali, Saklolo and My House Husband: Ikaw Na! with his real life wife Judy Ann Santos-Agoncillo, he is also a hobbyist on Car Drifting & photography. He is the uncle of fellow former child actress and Now as a new teen actress Jana Agoncillo.

Bianca Gonzales hosted programs on ABS-CBN 2 & Cinema One, she is now seen on the Filipino morning program Umagang Kay Ganda and also she hosted a reality competition show Pinoy Big Brother. She is the eldest brother of fellow TV host JC Gonzales

JC Gonzales is now based in California for hosting a youth-oriented talk show on The Filipino Channel. He is the brother of fellow TV host Bianca Gonzales-Intal.

Bam Aquino became a senator of the Philippines between 2013 and 2019, he returns to hosting via Good Times With Mo Twister & Friends a popular trending morning talk program still currently Aired on Magic 89.9 FM Manila every Mondays for himself. He is also the cousins of fellow TV host and actress Kris Aquino and the late former Philippine President Benigno "Noynoy" Aquino III.

Nikki Gil is now a TV host and actress on ABS-CBN but she also hosted ASAP and she is still a VJ on myx, her former teleseryes are Pieta, Mundo Man ay Magunaw, Maria Mercedes and her newest Hawak Kamay aired on the network itself. As of 2022, Nikki returned to showbiz via a stage musical play called Carousel.

Mariel Rodriguez is now an actress and TV host, she hosted Wowowillie on TV5 and various movies, including Agent X44 and Sa Ngalan ng Ama, Ina at mga Anak.

Joaqui Valdez used to host a travel lifestyle program 100% Pinoy! on GMA 7 and now currently inactive in showbiz, but he is still performing as a singer.

Pia Arcangel is now a news anchor on GMA 7's longest running news program Saksi and the second-longest-running news program 24 Oras Weekend. She is also the former news anchor of Balitanghali on QTV 11/Q 11 (formerly GMA News TV 11/27 & now GTV 27).

Ria Tanjuatco-Trillo hosts a shopping magazine talk show Shop Talk on ANC, and also became a news anchor on the now-defunct CNN Philippines 9 (now RPTV 9) and now currently seen on Billionaryo News Channel was launched on September 9, 2024 also replacing CNN Philippines last January 31, 2024.

Marieton Pacheco is currently a news reporter on TFC in California. She was previously a reporter on TV Patrol.

Angel Rivero is still active on radio and television programs and also can be seen on her YouTube channel.

Juddah Paolo still sings in various bars in Metro Manila and now currently as a Vlogger and has a YouTube channel.

== See also ==
- List of programs broadcast by the ABS-CBN News Channel
- List of programs broadcast by Studio 23
