= Usapang Business =

- Genre: Business
- Directed by: Alan Sinsuat
- Presented by: Ces Drilon; Cathy Yang; David Celdran
- Country of origin: Philippines
- Original languages: English (1996–1999); Filipino (1999–2002)
- No. of episodes: n/a (airs Mondays, later Saturdays)

Production
- Executive producer: Pauline Halili
- Running time: 60 minutes
- Production company: ABS-CBN News and Current Affairs

Original release
- Network: ABS-CBN (1996–1998); ANC (1999–2002)
- Release: May 9, 1996 – October 26, 2002

Related
- Pipol (ABS-CBN)

Usapang Business (transl. business talk) is a Philippine television public affairs show broadcast by ABS-CBN and ANC. Originally hosted by Ces Drilon and Cathy Yang, it aired from May 9, 1996 to October 26, 2002. Drilon serve as the final hosts.

The format of the weekly news magazine program that aired Tuesday nights after The World Tonight (later Pulso: Aksyon Balita and ABS-CBN Headlines) (later moved to Saturday) features innovative businesses that are on the fast-track in the Philippines.

== Hosts ==
- Ces Drilon (1996–2002)
- Cathy Yang (1996–1999)
- David Celdran (1997–2001)

== See also ==
- List of programs broadcast by ABS-CBN

Executive Producer - Oscar Yema
