= Ako Ang Simula =

- Genre: Public service
- Created by: ABS-CBN Corporation
- Developed by: ABS-CBN News and Current Affairs
- Directed by: Pinggoy Generoso; Ricky Ligon; Boying Palileo
- Presented by: Karen Davila; Anthony Taberna; Atty. Pochoy Labog
- Opening theme: "Ako Ang Simula" by Rico Blanco, Raimund Marasigan and Aia de Leon
- Country of origin: Philippines
- Original language: Filipino
- No. of episodes: 72

Production
- Executive producer: Joseph Ryan L. Aquino
- Producers: Dennis Cortes; Roanne Duran; Rodel Madridano; Mau Maquiddang; Julius Ramos; Gerome Vallangca
- Editors: Rochie Bernabe; Joel Tapel
- Running time: 60 minutes

Original release
- Network: ABS-CBN
- Release: October 8, 2011 – February 20, 2013

Ako Ang Simula (transl. it begins with me) is a Philippine television public service show broadcast by ABS-CBN. Hosted by Karen Davila, Anthony Taberna and Atty. Pochoy Labog, it aired on ABS-CBN from October 8, 2011 to February 20, 2013, replacing ABS-CBN News & Current Affairs Special Report and was replaced by Banana Nite. Encore broadcast also air over ABS-CBN News Channel every Sunday from October 9, 2011 to February 24, 2013.

== Overview ==
Ako Ang Simula was based on an election campaign was launched on May 11, 2009, and was its banner for the network's coverage of the 2010 Presidential Elections.

== Host ==
- Karen Davila
- Anthony Taberna
- Atty. Pochoy Labog

== Awards and nominations ==
Awards and nominations
Year	Award giving body	Category	Nominated work/ Person	Results
2012	Anak TV Awards	Anak TV Seal	Ako Ang Simula	Won
2013	27th PMPC Star Awards for Television	Best Magazine Show	Ako Ang Simula	Included

== See also ==
- List of programs broadcast by ABS-CBN
- List of programs broadcast by ABS-CBN News Channel
