= Renato Constantino =

Filipino historian (1919–1999)

- Born: Renato Reyes Constantino; March 10, 1919; Manila, Philippines
- Died: September 15, 1999 (aged 80); Quezon City, Philippines
- Resting place: Loyola Memorial Park Marikina, Philippines
- Education: University of the Philippines Manila (BA); New York University (MA)
- Occupations: Historian, educator
- Spouse: Letizia Roxas Constantino (m. 1943)
- Children: 2, including Karina
- Relatives: Randy David (son-in-law); Lourdes "Dudi" Balderrama Constantino (daughter-in-law); Kara David (granddaughter); Karmina Constantino (granddaughter); Anna Marika Lissa "Maoi" Constantino (granddaughter); Renato Redentor "Red" Constantino (grandson); Nina Elisa "Ninel" Constantino (granddaughter); Anna Karmina "KC" Constantino (granddaughter); Carlos Primo "CP" David (grandson); Nadya Melina "Nadya" David (granddaughter); Jovita Erika "Jika" David (granddaughter)
- Website: www.constantinofoundation.org

Renato Reyes Constantino Sr. (March 10, 1919 – September 15, 1999) was a Filipino historian best known for The Philippines: A Past Revisited and The Continuing Past, both of which he co-authored with the writer and historian Letizia Roxas Constantino, his lifelong collaborator and wife. He is at times referred to as a historian of the leftist tradition in Philippine historiography, largely because, unlike many historians, he and his partner, Letizia, declared their biases openly rather than pretend fealty to what both called illusory objectivity. Constantino was in the foreign service, working as Executive Secretary of the Philippine Mission to the United Nations and as Counsellor of the Department of Foreign Affairs.

He is the father of businessman and activist, Renato “RC” Constantino, Jr., best known for his leadership of the watershed Asia-Pacific Conference on East Timor (APCET), widely considered the key event that led to the ultimate liberation of East Timor from Indonesian rule, and former Civil Service Commission Chairperson Karina Constantino-David, the guitarist and composer of the celebrated protest and folk music duo Inang Laya. Constantino is the father-in-law of writer and activist Lourdes "Dudi" Balderrama Constantino, wife and activist partner of RC, and University of the Philippines Diliman sociology professor emeritus Randy David, husband of Karina.

He is the grandfather of Climate Policy Analyst Renato Redentor Constantino, News Anchor and Journalist Karmina Constantino-Torres, and Professor and Journalist Kara David.

== Education and early career ==
Constantino attended the University of the Philippines where he became the youngest editor of the university's student publication, The Philippine Collegian. He wrote editorial columns criticizing President Manuel Quezon, which earned the attention of the President by responding to the article in one of his speeches. It was also in UP where he co-founded the Alpha Phi Beta fraternity, alongside 17 other students; professor and future Senator Ambrosio Padilla served as their Charter Adviser.

When the Second World War erupted, Constantino fought in Bataan and was a member of an intelligence team spying on the Japanese. He also worked as a journalist during the war.

At the conclusion of the war, Constantino joined the Philippine Mission to the United Nations from 1946 to 1949 as its Executive Secretary. He worked as a counselor for the Department of Foreign Affairs from 1949 to 1951. These exposures to foreign service became the foundations of a book he wrote about the United Nations.

== Academic career ==
Constantino held professorial positions at the University of the Philippines (Diliman and Manila), Far Eastern University, Adamson University, and Arellano University. He was also a visiting lecturer in universities in London, Sweden, Japan, Germany, Malaysia and Thailand. He served as a member of the Editorial Board of the Journal of Contemporary Asia, and Trustee of Focus on the Global South in Bangkok.

He wrote around 30 books and numerous pamphlets and monographs. Among Constantino's well-known books are A Past Revisited and The Continuing Past. He also wrote The Making of a Filipino (a biography of Claro M. Recto), The Essential Tañada (On Statesman and Senator Lorenzo M. Tañada), Neo-colonial Identity and Counter-Consciousness, and The Nationalist Alternative. Several of his books have been translated into Japanese and The Nationalist Alternative has a Malaysian translation.

Constantino earned various distinctions for his historical work. He received nationalism awards from Quezon City in 1987, Manila in 1988, The Civil Liberties Union in 1988, and the University of the Philippines Manila in 1989. Constantino was also the Manila's Diwa ng Lahi awardee in 1989. He was conferred the Doctor of Arts and Letters (honoris causa) from the Polytechnic University of the Philippines in 1989 and a Doctor of Laws (honoris causa) from the University of the Philippines Diliman in 1990.

Constantino died in 1999 at age 80.

== Works ==
- The Miseducation of the Filipino (1959)
- Recto Reader: Excerpts from the Speeches of Claro M. Recto (1965)
- Veneration Without Understanding (1969)
- The Making of a Filipino: A Story of Philippine Colonial Politics (1969)
- Dissent and Counter-consciousness (1970)
- A History of the Philippines (with Letizia R. Constantino; 1975)
- The Philippines: A Past Revisited (1975)
- Philippines: A Continuing Past (with Letizia R. Constantino; 1978)
- The Aquino Watch (1987)
- Demystifying Aquino (1989)
- The Essential Tañada (1989)
- History: Myths and Reality (1992)

== Legacy ==
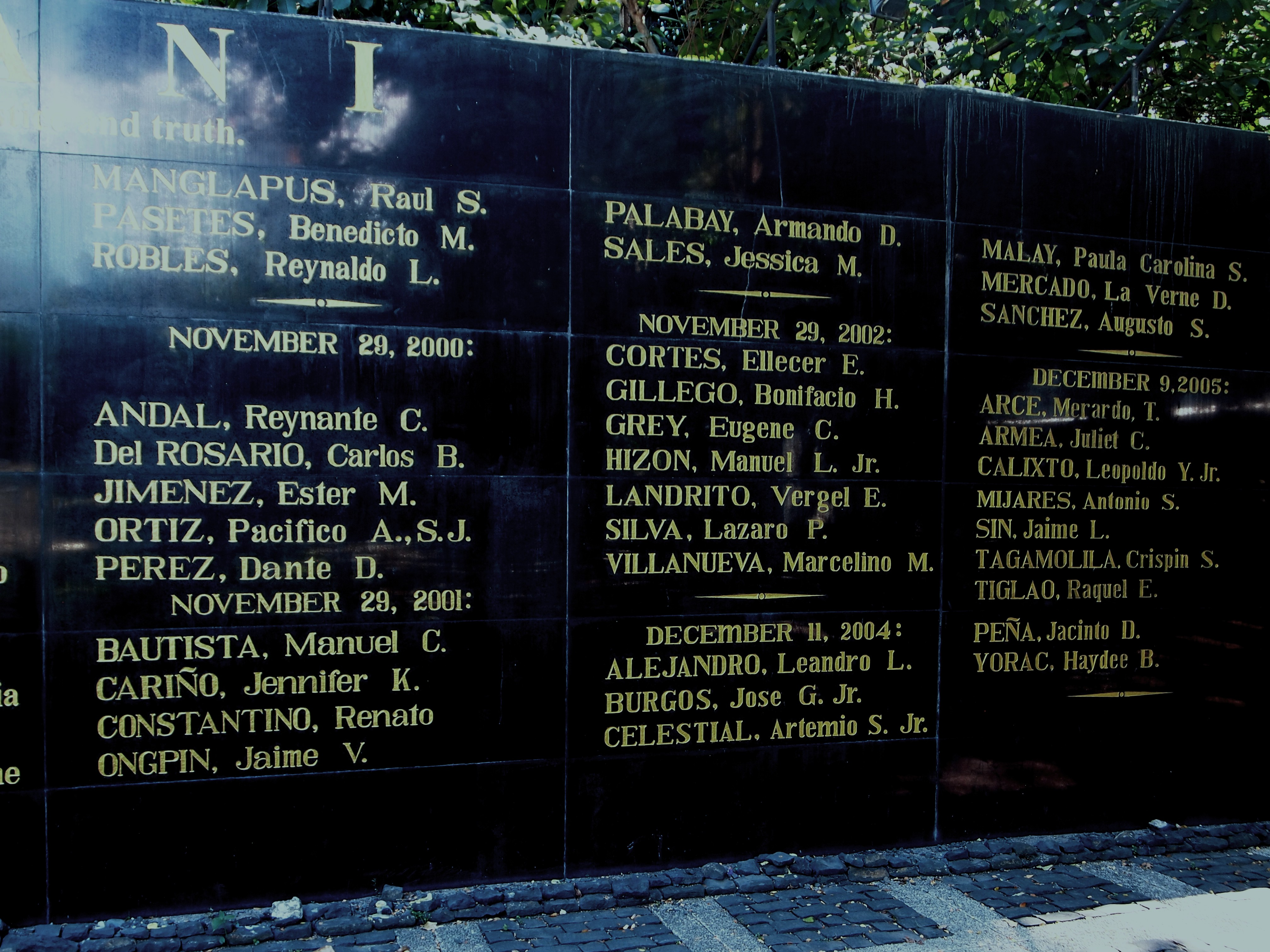
Detail of the Wall of Remembrance at the Bantayog ng mga Bayani, showing names from the 2001 batch of Bantayog Honorees, including that of Renato Constantino.

For his academic contributions to the struggle against the Marcos dictatorship, his name is inscribed on the Wall of Remembrance at the Philippines' Bantayog ng mga Bayani (Monument of Heroes).

Today, Constantino is regarded as one of the leading Filipino nationalist historians of the mid-20th century, who advocated for a Filipino-centric view of the country's history, alongside his contemporaries Teodoro Agoncillo and Horacio de la Costa.
