= Paano Kita Mapasasalamatan? =

Paano Kita Mapasasalamatan? may refer to:

- "Paano Kita Mapasasalamatan?", a 1980 song written by George Canseco
- Paano Kita Mapasasalamatan? (TV series), a 2020–2021 Philippine documentary program
