= Boyet =

Boyet is both a given name and surname. Notable people with the name include:

- Boyet Fernandez (21st century), Filipino champion basketball head coach
- Christopher de Leon (born 1953), Filipino actor also known as Boyet
- Boyet Sison (1963–2022), Filipino journalist and sports commentator
- Benjamin Boyet (born 1979), French rugby union footballer
- Boyet Bautista (born 1981), Filipino basketball player
