= Lady Dada =

2010 Philippine television drama series

- Genre: Sitcom, Drama
- Developed by: Perci Intalan
- Written by: Elmer Gatchalian; Andrew Paredes
- Directed by: Joyce Bernal
- Creative director: Benedict Mique
- Starring: Ryan Agoncillo; Mylene Dizon; Keempee de Leon
- Country of origin: Philippines
- Original language: Filipino
- No. of episodes: 5

Production
- Executive producer: Shirley Fabella
- Camera setup: Multiple-camera setup

Original release
- Network: TV5
- Release: September 8 – October 6, 2010

Lady Dada is a Philippine television sitcom series broadcast by TV5. Directed by Joyce Bernal, it stars Ryan Agoncillo, Mylene Dizon and Keempee de Leon. It aired from September 8 to October 6, 2010, and was replaced by The Broken Hearts Club.

== Plot ==
“Lady Dada” tells the story of hard luck Dindo (Ryan Agoncillo) who barely succeeds in every business and job he gets into. His star-crossed ventures eventually ruined his marriage with Rina (Mylene Dizon). After series of unfortunate events, he proves to be a bad luck magnet as he was restrained to get near his son Miko (Nathaniel Britt); this after he became violent in a bar owned by his wife and her ex-suitor Brian (Ryan Eigenmann).

Macario, his closeted high school best friend, enters the picture in literally gay fashion as Kylie (Keempee de Leon) on the rescue. He convinced Dindo to mask his identity as a pretty woman and audition to be the next drag queen in Rina's bar. In order to get closer to his wife and son, Dindo is left without a choice but to turn from a man to a woman to a drag queen! His woman pretense gets even awkward as she, err, he gets courted by Rina's widower brother Henry (Roderick Paulate).

== Cast ==
- Ryan Agoncillo as Dindo/Dada/Lady Dada
- Roderick Paulate as Henry
- Keempee de Leon as Macario/Kylie
- Mylene Dizon as Rina
- Ryan Eigenmann as Brian
- Edgar Allan Guzman as Junior
- Nathaniel Britt as Miko

== See also ==
- List of TV5 (Philippine TV network) original programming
