= Dreamcatchers (TV series) =

Malaysian travel documentary television series

- Genre: Travel documentary
- Created by: Philippe Estiot and Iva Agüero
- Country of origin: Malaysia
- Original language: English
- No. of seasons: 3
- No. of episodes: 28

Production
- Executive producer: Iva Agüero Philippe Estiot TL Khoo
- Editor: Eman Azrin Azhar Eva E. Zahar Bobby Tan
- Running time: 26 minutes
- Production companies: Trifecta Collective Phiva Prod (formerly Phil and Iva Productions Sdn. Bhd.)

Dreamcatchers is a travel documentary television series created and presented by Philippe Estiot and Iva Agüero, in collaboration with Malaysian production company Trifecta Collective. The series is a quest for "dreamcatchers"—people that have changed their life to pursue a dream. Throughout the series, Dreamcatchers showcases the local culture of each destination as the search expands across Southeast Asia.

== Premise ==
Dreamcatchers is a factual entertainment series where each episode introduces a different "dreamcatcher" character and their story. The episodes begin with Philippe Estiot and Iva Agüero travelling from one destination to another in search of dreamcatcher to interview. As they seek out dreamcatchers, Philippe and Iva also become immersed in the local culture of a region, exploring food, learning about traditions and learning from the local people.

== Production ==
Dreamcatchers is produced by Phiva Prod (formerly Phil & Iva Productions Sdn. Bhd.), a full-service production company registered in Malaysia founded by Philippe and Iva While Dreamcatchers is still the company's main production, Phiva Prod also produces commissioned shows for cable television, feature-length documentaries and corporate videos.

== Distribution ==
Dreamcatchers is currently distributed by kwanza, a premium factual-specialist distribution and production company operating globally. The series has aired in over fifty countries worldwide on multiple cable television channels, including:

- Outside TV (US)
- Canal Off (Brazil)
- Metro Channel (Philippines)
- BeritaSatu (Indonesia)
- TrueVisions (Thailand)
- MyZen TV (Europe, Russia, Canada)
- La Effe (Italy)
- Viajar (Spain)
- ERT3 (Greece)

== Series overview ==
=== Season One (2017) ===
Season one of Dreamcatchers was filmed in Indonesia. It first premiered in July 2017, and went on to air in over 45 countries worldwide. The season was named a National Winner in the Asian Academy Creative Awards and represented Malaysia in the Best Non-Scripted Entertainment category.

Episode	Dreamcatcher(s)	Title	Description
1	Jean-Philippe	From Chimney Sweep to Fisherman	The adventure begins! Climb aboard Dali, as Phil and Iva work hard to get their boat ready and set sail from Thailand to Indonesia. Their four-day navigation brings them to the exotic island of Pulau Weh. They go scuba diving and meet Raja, a friendly local who tells them about Jean-Philippe: a former chimney sweep who left France 25 years ago, and found happiness living as a fisherman on this tiny island of North Sumatra.
2	Quentin & Gosia	For the Love of Surf	Experience everyday life aboard a sailboat as Phil and Iva go spearfishing and re-provision their boat on land. While sailing from Sumatra to Simelue Island, they encounter another sailboat named Bonnie. It took Quentin & Gosia ten years to fulfil their dream of buying their own sailboat to go surf the notorious Indonesian waves. After sailing through rough weather, follow Iva as enthusiastic local children give her a guided tour of the Sinabang market.
3	The McGroders	Raising a Family Aboard a Ship	As the search for Dreamcatchers continues, Phil finds a way to pick some fresh coconuts on a paradise beach and Iva takes us through the mangroves in search of a fresh water creek. They leave the boat and travel inland to the majestic volcanic site of Lake Toba. Back on the water, they sail to the Telo Island group and finally meet John and Belinda, who have raised their two children aboard their boat, The Barrenjoey, while conducting surf charters in Indonesia.
4	Diego & Travis	The Mentawai Surfcamp	After stocking up in the chaotic city of Padang, Phil and Iva set sail to discover the best surf spot in Indonesia: the Mentawai islands. They meet Phil's old friend Diego, who during seven years fought to bring his surf camp to life. Iva takes a tour of the permaculture efforts on the island, as Diego shares his dream of a sustainable agriculture. Phil and Iva follow the surfers to a world-famous break and meet Travis, a pro-surfer who quit his comfortable life at home to chase the waves all over the world.
5	Maria	Protector of the Sumatran Tigers	Phil and Iva arrive at the most remote island yet: Pulau Sanding. On this uninhabited piece of paradise, they are attacked by sandflies, lose all communication, and Iva has her first breakdown of the trip. As they set sail, trouble continues and their engine fails. A stop in the curious city of Bengkulu allows them to rest and recover before continuing to fight their way against the wind and the waves. At last, they reach a wildlife protection area South of Sumatra where they meet Maria, a conservation specialist who re-introduces conflict tigers into nature at Tambling Wildlife Nature Conservation.
6	Phil & Iva	The Journey to Becoming Dreamcatchers	Phil and Iva anchor their boat Dali in the imposing and world-famous Krakatau volcanic site. They climb the active volcano and are rewarded with the most breathtaking scenery of their trip. A stop in the busy capital of Jakarta allows them to fix their engine before setting sail for the island of Belitung. There, they go spearfishing and enjoy the underwater life one last time before reaching their final destination of Kuching, Borneo. It is time for them to reflect on their long journey around Indonesia, in an emotional conclusion to their epic voyage.

=== Season Two (2018) ===
Season two of Dreamcatchers premiered on 9 May 2019, with episodes filmed in East Malaysia.

Episode	Dreamcatcher(s)	Title	Description
1	Alena	The Rivers of Borneo	The Borneo adventure begins with an explosion of culture and sound at the Rainforest World Music Festival. Malaysian artist Alena Murang shares her Dreamcatcher journey that saw her leave the corporate world behind to pursue her passion for music. Back on the water, Phil and Iva get their first taste of Sarawak as they sail up the Borneo rivers and are invited to party at an Iban longhouse.
2	Dick, Pril & Jessa	Into the Jungle	Meet Dick and Pril, an octogenarian couple that built a sailboat in their Californian backyard and set off to discover the world. With their sailboat safely berthed at the Miri Marina, Phil and Iva travel deep into the rainforest to explore some of the largest cave systems in the world. In the jungle they meet 23-year-old Jessa, a fearless entomologist prepared to risk it all for the love of insects.
3	Steph & Belén	A Tale of Two Divers	Sailing from Miri to the island of Labuan, Phil and Iva explore the spectacular underwater life of Borneo. They are guided by Steph and Belén; two young dive masters from Malaysia and Argentina, whose Dreamcatcher journeys led them both to change their lives in search of happiness. Amongst the oil platforms of Labuan, Phil and Iva discover stunning beaches, do some boat maintenance and explore this very unusual island.
4	Adrian & Inés	Eat, Sleep, Surf, Repeat	Phil and Iva fly to Bali in Indonesia to fulfil their dream of learning how to surf. The waves have some hard lessons to teach them but perseverance pays off. In the bustling city of Seminyak they are greeted by Balinese beauty Inés who gave up her Miss Indonesia crown to pursue her dream of being a restaurateur alongside her husband Adrian.
5	Alex	A Humanitarian Dream Comes True	Phil and Iva travel to Ubud in the heart of Bali to meet a new kind of Dreamcatcher: one who changed his life to help others. Alex moved from Switzerland to Indonesia to set up a foundation that provides medical care to Balinese people in need. To conclude their Indonesian voyage, Phil and Iva travel to the island of Nusa Penida where they witness the raw beauty of nature.
6	Dane	Reaching New Heights	Back in Borneo, Phil and Iva leave Sarawak and sail their boat to Sabah, spotting the emblematic Mount Kinabalu from the water. Determined to climb it, they embark on an adventure that takes them to the summit and some of the most magnificent landscapes they have ever seen. Back in the city of Kota Kinabalu they meet Dane, an Australian Dreamcatcher, who has made a new life for himself by embracing the local culture.
7	Kalani, YuBee and Sue	Dancing with Turtles	Phil and Iva travel to Pom Pom Island, a resplendent jewel of an island home to Kalani and Yu Bee. A former US Marine, Kalani gave up his home and followed his wife to Borneo in order to save their marriage. On this gem of an island, Phil and Iva dive by day and by night and encounter Sue, a Brazilian Dreamcatcher. She shares the emotional journey that led her from a desk job in the city of São Paulo to releasing baby turtles on this tropical paradise.
8	Jo & Ann	Girl Power	Strong women take center stage in the eclectic city of Kota Kinabalu. Phil and Iva meet Jo, a bubbly new mom at the head of her successful social enterprise: Changgih Designs. She shares her emotional journey towards becoming a Dreamcatcher while returning to her Sabahan roots. Fellow Sabahan Ann Osman recounts her struggle to ditch the corporate world and become Malaysia's first Female Mixed Martial Arts fighter.
9	Franco, Anna & Justin	Voices of Malaysia	A Malaysian husband and wife team surprise Phil and Iva with their bravery and Dreamcatcher spirit. Having learned their sailing skills from YouTube, Franco and Anna travel the world fulfilling their passion for diving. Not far away, on the verdant Gaya Island, Phil and Iva encounter a local conservation specialist who has made it his life mission to be the voice of the animals and plants around him.
10		Look Where Your Dreams Can Take You	After an epic voyage around Borneo and Bali, Phil and Iva look back at the unforgettable adventures and Dreamcatcher stories. A journey where the destination was less important than the amazing landscapes and experiences they lived along the way. The Dreamcatchers share their personal wisdom and united, their voices echo in messages of profound inspiration.

=== Season Three (2019) ===
Season three of Dreamcatchers was shot entirely in the Philippines and premiered in October 2019 on ABS-CBN's Metro Channel, before continuing to air around the globe. The "Malapacao" episode from the season was named a National Winner in the Asian Academy Creative Awards, and represented Philippines in the Best Lifestyle Programme category.

Episode	Dreamcatcher(s)	Title	Description
1	Tom	Tom	Phil and Iva leave the shores of Borneo and set sail on their boat Dali for a new adventure in the Philippines. While at sea, things quickly take a turn for the worse as their crew Miguel falls in the water. Arriving at the world famous Palawan island, they set out to discover Port Barton. In this quiet seaside town they meet Tom, a one-armed MMA fighter and motorbike rider who is building an orphanage in the memory of his deceased daughter.
2	Dylan & Rosie	Dylan & Rosie	Sailing from one sparking island to the next, Phil and Iva explore the spectacular archipelago of Bacuit Bay in search of more Dreamcatchers. Anchoring in El Nido, they island hop with locals and meet Dylan who left his life in South Africa behind to start a new chapter under the sun. On land, another inspiring encounter awaits as they meet Rosie. This beautiful expectant mom quit her corporate job in fast fashion to pursue her dream of a fulfilling island life.
3	Leeann	Leeann	A once in a lifetime encounter with Leeann takes Phil and Iva into a parallel universe. For 35 years, this self-proclaimed Queen of Malapacao has been living on her own piece of paradise. A naturopath and a nudist, Leeann holds a wealth of information about the natural world and has created a magical kingdom of her own.
4	Diego & Javier	Diego & Javier	Heartwarming moments with locals on the beach mark each anchorage as Phil and Iva sail from Palawan towards the island of Linapacan. In an unexpected encounter, they meet two Spaniards on inflatable kayaks. Childhood friends that have decided on an improbable adventure, Diego and Javier are two Dreamcatchers that believe in doing things differently.
5	Raul, Ichay & Dirk	Raul, Ichay & Dirk	Exploring the wealth of natural beauty in the Philippines, Phil and Iva anchor inside a sacred ancestral domain: the island of Coron. The surrounding limestone cliffs give way to clear water and hidden freshwater lakes. In the neighbouring town, they meet Raul & Ichay, a power couple from Manila who decided to stop accumulating wealth and start enjoying their lives. Phil & Iva's desire to explore the world-class dive sites of the area leads them further north and to an encounter with Dirk, a passionate diver who dedicates his life to protecting the endangered dugong.
6	Monica, Lilibeth & Catherine	Project Pearls	With little time left before hauling their sailboat out of the water, Phil and Iva enjoy the last of the sailing and prepare a special meal onboard. At the boatyard, tensions rise as Dali is hauled out of the water and stored away for hibernation. A trip to the sprawling metropolis of Manila reveals that Dreamcatchers can be found in the city, too. In the most humble surroundings, Project Pearls nourishes and supports the dreams of young children aspiring to break free from the cycle of poverty.
7	Marco & Ilyn	Marco & Ilyn	Swapping their sailboat for four wheels, Phil and Iva start traveling the island of Luzon by land. During an unexpected pitstop in a picturesque Spanish-style town, they meet Marco: a driven entrepreneur who returned home to the Philippines to fulfil his beer-brewing dreams. On the northern coast of the island, in a little village tucked away in the jungle, they are welcomed by Ilyn. A true Cinderella story, this Overseas Foreign Worker found her happily ever after when she returned to the Philippines and married her prince.
8	Aklay	Aklay	Phil and Iva continue their road-trip, trying local Filipino cuisine on the way. The rainy season has brought a lot of storms and the weather makes the dirt roads very dangerous. Lost and with night falling, an act of generosity from a local farmer saves them from spending the night in the car. Arriving in the Mountain Province they hunt down an elusive French chef who has been living as a recluse in the lush hills of the region.
9	Nicola & Viktor Ashley, Shanna, Safia & Marty	Siargao	An explosion of youth and colour await on Siargao, a gemlike island known for its surf and endless miles of coconut trees. Travellers from all corners of the globe flock to the island's shores and fall in love with the beauty and the vibe of Siargao. In a medley of voices, four young backpackers share their experiences and why they decided to drop everything and make this island their temporary home.
10	Raquel	Raquel	Phil and Iva are welcomed to the Central Visayas region of the Philippines by its most adorable local resident: the tiny Filipino Tarsier. With the Chocolate Hills of Bohol as a backdrop, their search for Dreamcatchers leads them to Raquel. A fierce and determined Cebu native, Raquel overcame all the hardships of her childhood and never gave up on her dreams. Today, she has built an empire with her resilience and love for the local chocolate tablea.
11	Renato	Bicolano Man	A perfectly symmetrical active volcano sets the scene for the adventure around the Bicol region. Here, a former school teacher shares his journey touching journey to self-realisation. His love for the culinary variety of his hometown decided to give up the school room and become an ambassador for his region. Phil and Iva fly back to Manila where they decide to get up close & personal by exploring the city on foot.
12		Season Finale	The Batanes islands are the last frontier and the northernmost islands of the Philippines. Surviving an adrenaline pumping and precarious boat ride, Phil and Iva set foot on the wild shores of Itbayat. One of the world's largest uplifted corals, the island's natural beauty and rich local heritage are breathtaking. On the rolling hills of Batan, Phil and Iva reflect on their epic Filipino odyssey and all the Dreamcatchers they met along the way.
