= Balitang America =

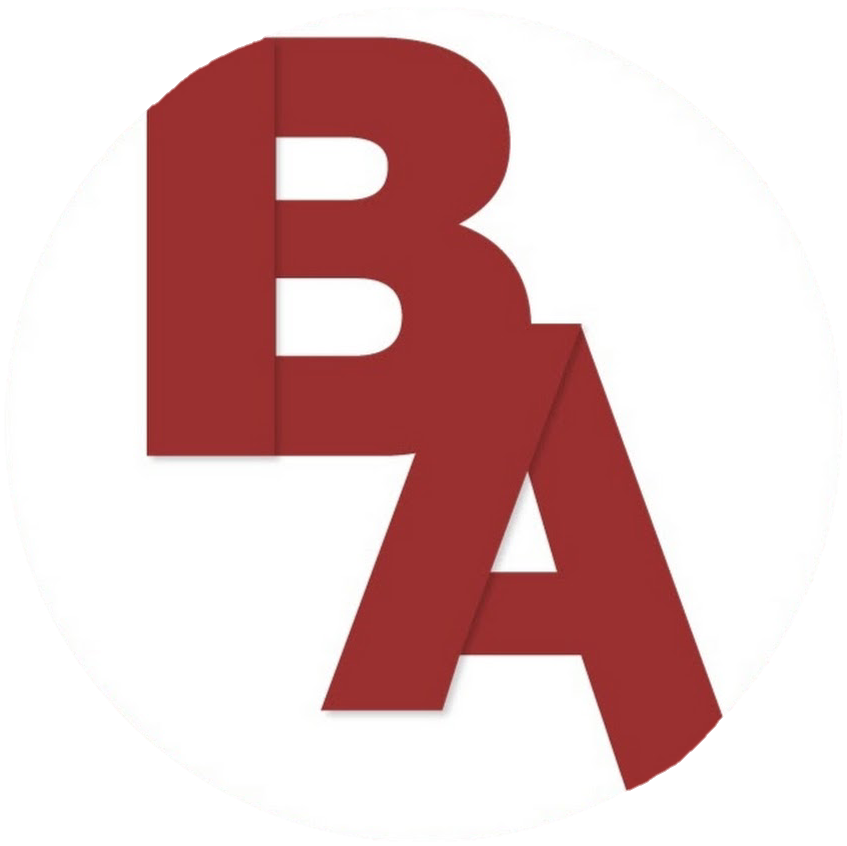
- Final logo
- Directed by: Henry Ballesteros
- Presented by: TJ Manotoc; Ginger Conejero
- Country of origin: United States
- Original languages: English; Filipino

Production
- Executive producers: Joey Caburnida; Henni Espinosa
- Camera setup: Multiple-camera setup
- Running time: 30 minutes
- Production company: ABS-CBN News and Current Affairs

Original release
- Network: TFC
- Release: September 28, 2002 – July 16, 2021

Balitang America (Shorten to BA) is an American television news broadcasting show by TFC. Originally anchored by Cara Subijano, it aired from September 28, 2002 to July 16, 2021, and was replaced by TFC News Now North America. TJ Manotoc serve as the final anchor.

== Overview ==
Balitang America was the first Filipino-American news program to ever be broadcast across all of North America; it was a 30-minute newscast with a national focus that aired via satellite on TFC and its local affiliate station in the San Francisco Bay Area, KTSF. The show was also shown on a slightly delayed basis on the ABS-CBN News Channel (ANC) in the Philippines. Similar to how ANC did it, the show incorporated English subtitles for the Filipino soundbites in 2019.

== Segments ==
- Balitang Canada - a once-a-week segment highlighting top news stories related to Filipinos in Canada. It became a separate newscast airing weekly from 2012 to 2014 on TFC Canada.
- Pinoy Datebook - the newscast's community calendar which featured community updates, events and public service announcements.
- Pinoy Panawagan - a regular segment hosted by immigration lawyer Lourdes Tancinco where she answers viewers' U.S. immigration and visa questions.
- World News Round-up - a quick look at global situations anchored by Tony Velasquez from ABS-CBN News Headquarters in Manila.
- Isyu Ngayon - viewers were encouraged to join in answering a daily poll, normally a question on the hottest topic of the day.
- Your Space - featured a viewer's letter read by the news anchor.
- Money Matters - remittance rates and gas prices update.
- Hollywood Buzz! - movie review hosted by Manuel dela Rosa, also known as Manny, the Movie Guy.
- Tourism - featuring tips on how to get great deals and tour packages.
- Hot Jobs - highlighted different types of employment.

== Anchors ==
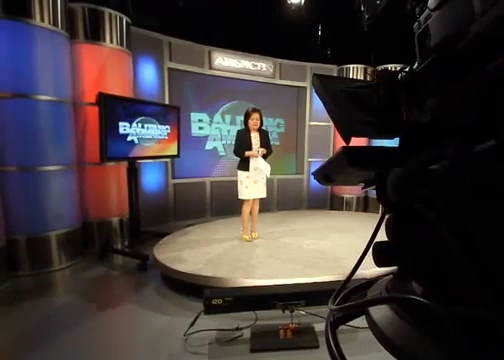
Ging Reyes on Balitang America

=== Final anchors ===
- TJ Manotoc - also serving as the current ABS-CBN News' North America Bureau Chief
- Ginger Conejero

=== Previous anchors ===
- Cara Subijano
- Gel Santos-Relos
- Ging Reyes - main fill-in anchor and ABS-CBN News' North America Bureau Chief from 2001 to 2010
