= Fast Break (radio program) =

Filipino radio sports talk show of DZMM

- Genre: Sports, talk show
- Running time: 1 hour (3:00 pm – 4:00 pm)
- Country of origin: Philippines
- Home station: DZMM
- TV adaptations: DZMM TeleRadyo
- Hosted by: Freddie Webb; Boyet Sison
- Created by: ABS-CBN
- Original release: August 2, 2014 – March 14, 2020

Fast Break (stylized as FastBreak and formerly known as Sports Talk) was a radio sports talk show on DZMM in the Philippines. It was aired every Saturday from 3:00 pm to 4:00 pm, with a simulcast on DZMM TeleRadyo and The Filipino Channel worldwide. This program talks about sports news and discussion from the two radio hosts. It is the successor of the old sports program Sports Talk, which was hosted by Freddie Webb and Gretchen Fullido. Fullido is replaced by Sison on August 2, 2014.

The show eventually did not go back on-air as Boyet Sison died on April 16, 2022.

== Hosts ==
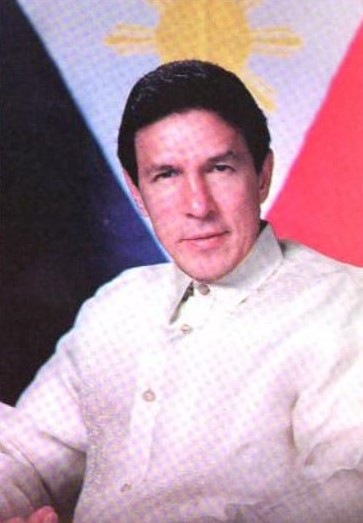
Freddie Webb served as an hosts.

=== Final hosts ===
- Freddie Webb (2004–20)
- Boyet Sison (2014–20)

==== Former host ====
- Gretchen Fullido (2004–14)

== See also ==
- DZMM TeleRadyo
- DZMM
