= Manolo Quezon =

Filipino writer and television host (born 1970)

Manuel L. Quezon III
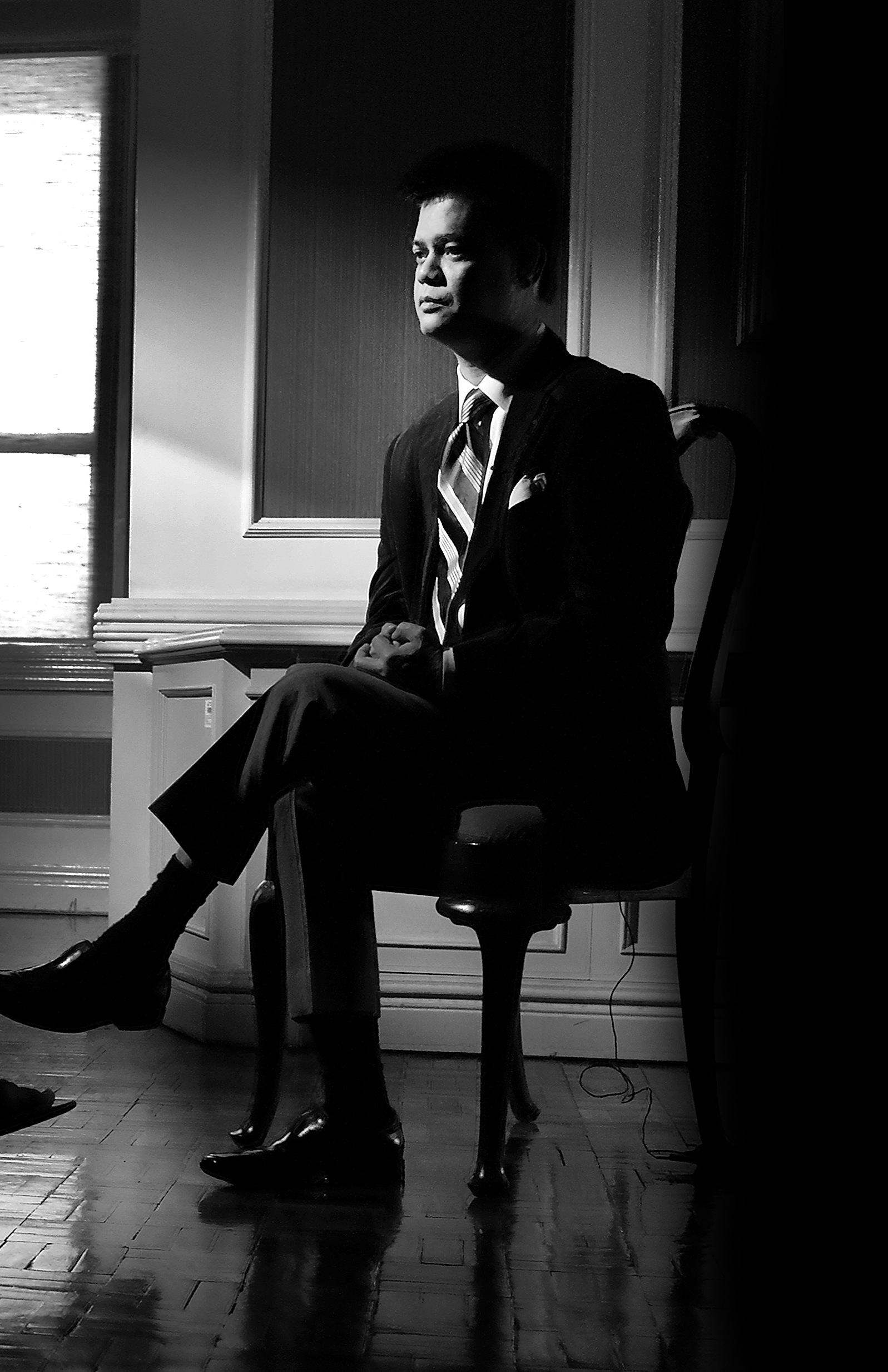
- Quezon in 2011

Secretary of the Presidential Communications Development and Strategic Planning Office
- Officer-in-Charge
- In office December 13, 2013 – June 30, 2016
- President: Benigno Aquino III
- Preceded by: Ricky Carandang
- Succeeded by: Position abolished

Undersecretary of the Presidential Communications Development and Strategic Planning Office
- In office August 1, 2010 – June 30, 2016
- President: Benigno Aquino III
- Preceded by: Position established
- Succeeded by: Position abolished

Personal details
- Born: Manuel Luis Casas Quezon III; May 30, 1970 (age 56)
- Spouse: Lourdes Gordolan (m. 2023)
- Relations: Manuel L. Quezon (grandfather)
- Parent(s): Manuel "Nonong" Quezon Jr. Lourdes "Lulu" Casas-Quezon
- Profession: Journalist, writer

Manuel Luis "Manolo" Casas Quezon III (born May 10, 1970) is a Filipino writer, historian, former television host and a grandson of former Philippine president Manuel L. Quezon.

Quezon is a columnist and editorial writer for the Philippine Daily Inquirer. From 2007 to 2010, he was also the host and writer of The Explainer on the cable ABS-CBN News Channel. In 2003, he was named presidential assistant for historical affairs during the presidency of Gloria Macapagal Arroyo.

He was a history curator from March 2004 to March 2005 at the Ayala Museum. He served as spokesman for the committee in charge of the inauguration of President Benigno S. Aquino III. After the implementation of Executive Order No. 4, Aquino appointed Quezon as undersecretary of the Presidential Communications Development and Strategic Planning Office. He served on that position from 2010 to 2016.

Quezon currently serves as executive director of the Museo del Galeón.

== Personal life ==
Quezon was born in 1970, an adopted son of Manuel L. "Nonong" Quezon, Jr. (1926–1998) and wife, Lourdes "Lulu" Casas-Quezon (1928–2012). He is the grandson of former president Manuel L. Quezon.

In a 2006 Philippine Daily Inquirer column, Quezon identified himself as a member of the LGBTQ community.

== Filmography ==
=== TV show ===
- The Explainer (2007–2010)

Political offices
| Preceded by Ricky Carandang | Secretary of the Presidential Communications Development and Strategic Planning Office; Officer-in-Charge; 2013–2016 | Position abolished |
| New office | Undersecretary of the Presidential Communications Development and Strategic Planning Office; 2010–2016 | Position abolished |
