= Karmina Constantino =

Filipino television news anchor and journalist

- Born: Anna Karmina Balderrama Constantino; February 14, 1975 (age 51); Metro Manila, Philippines
- Education: University of the Philippines Diliman
- Occupations: TV host news anchor journalist
- Spouse: Noel Torres (m. 2018)
- Children: 4
- Relatives: Kara David (cousin); Karina Constantino David (aunt); Renato Constantino (grandfather)

Anna Karmina Balderrama Constantino-Torres (born February 14, 1975) is a Filipina television broadcast journalist who anchors Dateline Philippines on ABS-CBN News Channel (ANC) during weekdays. Formerly she was a co-host of Breakfast on Studio 23 and a temporary replacement for the co-hosting chair in Mornings @ ANC. Constantino and fellow news anchor Tony Velasquez were the interviewers who represented ABS-CBN in PiliPinas Forum 2022, the multi-network interview series produced in partnership with the Philippine Commission on Elections that covered the candidates of the 2022 Philippine presidential election. Velasquez and Constantino were also co-hosting partners in DWPM Radyo 630 (until January 3, 2025) and TeleRadyo Serbisyo/DZMM TeleRadyo's Isyu Spotted, formerly branded as On the Spot, until September 30, 2025.

In 2022, Constantino was awarded a Jaime V. Ongpin Journalism Fellowship and a Marshall McLuhan Fellowship.

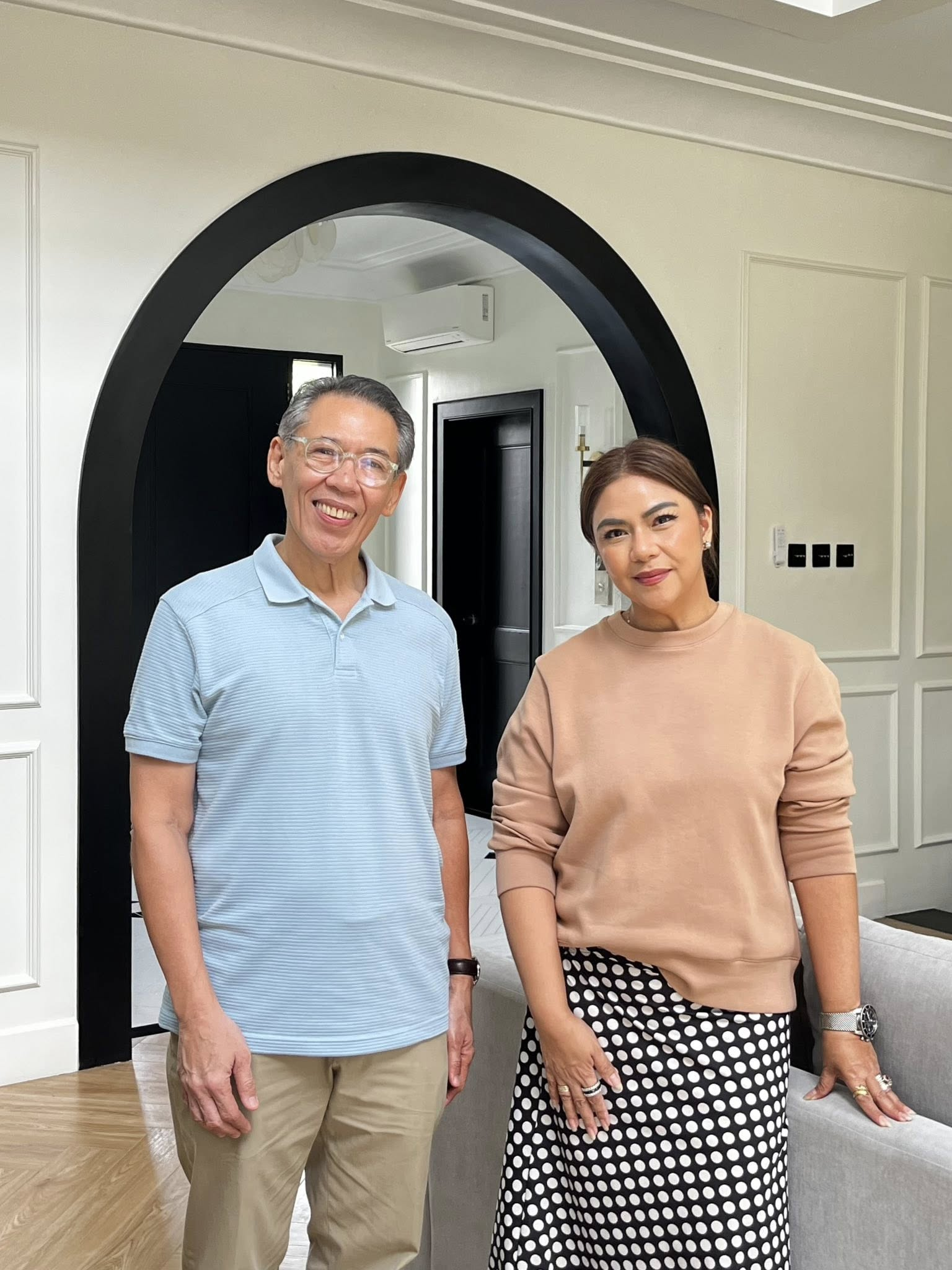
Constantino (right) with Akbayan representative Chel Diokno (left)

Known for her hard-hitting questions, Constantino went viral on Twitter in 2022 when she rebuffed presidential candidate Jose Montemayor Jr.'s insinuation that ANC accepted money from another presidential candidate, quipping, "I'm sorry, I’m not going to let that pass, Dr. Montemayor. We are not in the business of getting paid. I am personally insulted by this insinuation. We can go on with this interview, we can leave this topic and move on but let me tell you, this is not an insinuation that I will take lightly. This company is not in the business of getting paid. This journalist you are talking to right now has never been or ever will be paid by anyone to ask or not ask any questions."

On a Reddit interview, Constantino said that the media's role and responsibility in relation to disinformation is to "push back by seeking the truth always and retelling the same".

On the day of the death of former Philippine President Fidel Ramos, Constantino posted on Instagram photos of her and the former President that were taken during her 2015 interview with him. In that interview, Constantino said the former President "offered his apologies to my father and our family. . . . To many, they experienced his presidency. To me, I experienced his humanity."

== Early life and career ==
Anna Karmina Balderrama Constantino is the granddaughter of nationalist and historian Renato Constantino, niece of activist and musician Karina Constantino David, daughter of nationalist activist Renato "RC" Constantino Jr., and cousin of fellow journalist Kara David.

Constantino studied film at the University of the Philippines Diliman, but after graduation applied for a post at the now-defunct Sky News instead of a film outfit in Makati, the news outlet being just five minutes away from her family's house. At Sky News she opted for the production assistant's job instead of the reporter's job that was offered to her by then-Sky Cable head David Celdran. Within a year at the news outlet she was already writing and producing special reports, retaining this job until the media outlet's merger with Sarimanok News Network that created ANC. During an ANC news anchor's sick leave, Constantino was offered to chair the anchor's post as temporary replacement.

== Personal life ==
Constantino survived a brain aneurysm in 2015. She is married with four children.
