= Ryan Agoncillo =

Filipino actor, and television personality (born 1979)

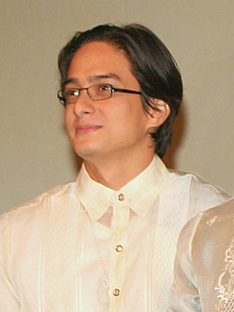
- Agoncillo in October 2008
- Born: Kristoffer Lou Gonzales Agoncillo; April 10, 1979 (age 47); Manila, Philippines
- Education: De La Salle University (B.A.)
- Occupations: Actor; model; host; musician; photographer
- Years active: 1995–present
- Spouse: Judy Ann Santos (m. 2009)
- Children: 3

Kristoffer Lou "Ryan" Gonzales Agoncillo (Tagalog pronunciation: [ɐgɔnˈsiljɔ]; born April 10, 1979) is a Filipino actor, model, host, musician, and photographer.

== Career ==
=== Modelling and hosting ===
Agoncillo started as a model at the age of 15, beginning as one of the early Penshoppe's Club Pen models. He has appeared in various television commercials for a variety of products such as Greenwich Pizza (together with Donita Rose), Sprite, Smart Communications, Emperador Brandy, Rexona, Swish mouthwash, and McDonald's.

Agoncillo became one of the original hosts of Mornings @ GMA, an early morning variety program of GMA Network. He also hosted Campus Video, a short-lived program shown every Saturday morning at GMA Network. He then moved to ABS-CBN and became a co-host on Talk TV, which is a morning talk show co-hosted by broadcasters Julius Babao and Christine Bersola-Babao, and actress Janette McBride. He also hosted Breakfast, an early morning variety program; Star in a Million, with Edu Manzano and Zsa Zsa Padilla, and Y Speak, a youth-oriented talk show and debate forum. Both shows aired in Studio 23, an ABS-CBN Corporation subsidiary. He won his first KBP Golden Dove Awards for Best Talk Show Host in 2005 for Studio 23's Y Speak.

Agoncillo was the main host of Philippine Idol alongside fellow ABS-CBN actress Heart Evangelista on ABC-5 (now TV5) before it was moved to GMA Network and rebooted into Pinoy Idol. In August 2008, he began hosting TV5's Talentadong Pinoy, which showcases Filipino undiscovered talents. He also hosted Endemol's Pinoy Fear Factor which aired on ABS-CBN. Pinoy Fear Factor was shot entirely in Argentina.

On October 24, 2009, Agoncillo finally returned to GMA Network and began hosting the country's longest running noontime show, Eat Bulaga!. From April 2010 to February 2011, Agoncillo co-hosted the noontime musical variety show P.O.5 on TV5. For his hosting stints in Eat Bulaga! and Talentadong Pinoy, Agoncillo became a four-time award winner of the Aliw Award for Best Male Emcee, for which he won consecutively from 2007 to 2010. In 2010, he was elevated to the Hall of Fame. Agoncillo hosted a game show called Picture! Picture! which premiered on November 23, 2013, on GMA Network, the show aired for 28 weeks ending on June 15, 2014. In 2015, Agoncillo was announced as the host of Cash Cab Philippines, the Philippine edition of the game show format Cash Cab. The show would go on to air 13 episodes on AXN Asia from December 22.

From 2020 to 2021, he was the director of the documentary show Paano Kita Mapasasalamatan? hosted by his wife Judy Ann Santos, marking his partial return to ABS-CBN despite his commitments to other networks.

=== Acting ===
Agoncillo joined the talent cast of ABS-CBN. He is most memorable for playing the love interest of Judy Ann Santos in the television soap opera Krystala. He once again appeared with Santos in the movies Kasal, Kasali, Kasalo (2006) and Sakal, Sakali, Saklolo (2007). He received best actor nominations from different award-giving bodies for his portrayal of a confused newly-wed husband in this film. He also played a role of a husband who lost his job and became a house husband in a movie with Judy Ann Santos titled My House Husband: Ikaw Na! in 2011.

He also played a main cast role in Bituing Walang Ningning, an ABS-CBN soap opera featuring singer-actresses Sarah Geronimo, Angelika dela Cruz, and Zsa Zsa Padilla in the leads.

Agoncillo also played leading roles in independent film projects and television drama shows. He played the distinct roles of a grease-filled beggar and a transvestite in two separate dramatic episodes of Maalaala Mo Kaya, the biographical drama series of ABS-CBN.

He starred in the ABS-CBN television series, Ysabella with his long-time on-screen partner and then girlfriend, Judy Ann Santos.

Agoncillo returned to acting on TV with drama series titled Pieta airing weekday afternoons over ABS-CBN where he portrayed Rigor, a character originally portrayed by Ace Vergel.

Agoncillo played the role of a high school teacher in the comedy sitcom George and Cecil (2009) alongside his wife Judy Ann Santos who played the role of a policewoman.

Agoncillo returned to acting again for his new role in May Bukas Pa where he played a media cameraman in the final 11 episodes of the series (253–263, aired January 22–February 5, 2010) after his wife Judy Ann Santos also guested in the show (episodes 237–241, aired December 31, 2009 – January 6, 2010).

Agoncillo appeared in Lady Dada on TV5 in 2010.

Agoncillo returned to acting again this time on GMA Network with My Husband's Lover as his very first television series on the network appearing in a minor role (also in a last week of the drama series), with his co-stars Carla Abellana and Dennis Trillo in 2013, and in Ismol Family from 2014 to 2016, also with Carla Abellana.

=== Photography ===
Agoncillo had a one-man colored photo exhibit at Glorietta, sponsored by Fujifilm in 2007. He published a black-and-white photography coffee table book titled Ploning – The Making as a birthday gift to his fiancée (now wife) Judy Ann Santos in 2008.

== Personal life ==
Ryan belongs to the Agoncillo clan in Rosario, Batangas.

Agoncillo married actress Judy Ann Santos in a private ceremony at the San Juan de Nepomuceno Church in the San Juan area of Batangas on April 28, 2009. They have three children together: Johanna Louise (Yohan), Juan Luis (Lucho) and Juana Luisa (Luna).

Agoncillo is a motorcycle enthusiast who enjoys drifting. He competes in various drifting events with a Nissan Silvia (S13) sponsored by Adidas, Yellow Cab Pizza, Shell, and Nexen Tire.

=== Education ===
Ryan Agoncillo attended his elementary education and secondary education at San Beda College of Alabang, Muntinlupa. He attended his tertiary education at De La Salle University, Manila campus and graduated with the degree of Bachelor of Arts in Organizational Communication.

== Filmography ==
=== Film ===
Year	Title	Role
2005	Kutob	Carlo
2006	Umaaraw, Umuulan	Paolo
2006	Kasal, Kasali, Kasalo	Jerome "Jed" Valeriano
2007	Ouija	cameo - Flight Attendant
2007	Sakal, Sakali, Saklolo	Jerome "Jed" Valeriano
2007	My Kuya's Wedding	Kuya Jeff
2008	Iskul Bukol 20 Years After: The Ungasis and Escaleras Adventure	Samnang
2011	My House Husband: Ikaw Na!	Rodrigo "Rod" Alvarez
2012	Si Agimat, si Enteng Kabisote at si Ako	cameo
2013	Ano ang Kulay ng mga Nakalimutang Pangarap?	Andre

=== Television ===
Year	Title	Role / Episodes
1998–2000	Campus Video	Himself
1998–1999	Mornings @ GMA	Himself / Host
1999–2000	Maynila	Various
2000–2002	Breakfast	Himself / Host
2001–2002	Talk TV	Himself / Host
2001–2002	Unang Hirit	Himself / Host
2001–2003	Star in a Million	Himself / Host
2001–2003	Kiss the Cook	Himself / Host
2001–2003	Review Night	Himself / Host
2001–2007	Alas Singko Y Medya/Magandang Umaga Bayan/Magandang Umaga Pilipinas	Himself / Host
2001–2010; 2026–present	ASAP	Host
2003–2006	Y Speak	Himself / Host
2004–2005	Krystala	Miguel San Diego
2005	Maalaala Mo Kaya	Ralph / Episode: "Rosaryo"
2006	Maalaala Mo Kaya	Rads / Episode: "Tubig"
2006	Komiks	Greg / Episode: "Inday Bote"
2006	Bituing Walang Ningning	Nico Escobar
2006	Philippine Idol	Himself / Host
2006	Your Song Presents: No Ordinary Love	Various
2007	Your Song Presents: I'll Have To Say I Love You In A Song	Robbie
2007–2008	Ysabella	Albert Amarillo / Andrew Amarillo
2008–2013; 2020–2021	Talentadong Pinoy	Himself / Host
2008–2009	Pieta	Rigor Tupaz
2009	Parekoy	Andong
2008–2009	Pinoy Fear Factor	Himself / Host
2009–2010	George and Cecil	Cecilio "Cecil" Murillo
2009–2010	Kuwentong Talentado	Host
2009–present	Eat Bulaga!	Co-host
2010	May Bukas Pa	Paolo
2010	P.O.5	Co-host
2010	Lady Dada	Dindo
2012	Talentadong Pinoy Kids Edition	Host
2012–2013	Talentadong Pinoy Junior	Host
2013	Dancing Nation Philippines: A Talentadong Pinoy Special Edition	Host
2012–2013	Talentadong Pinoy Worldwide	Host
2013	My Husband's Lover	Samuel Ledesma/Sam
2013–2014	Picture! Picture!	Host
2014	Celebrity Bluff	Guest Celebrity Gangnamm
2014	Anyo ng Pag-Ibig: Eat Bulaga! Lenten Drama Special 2014	Junior
2014–2016	Ismol Family	Jingo Ismol
2015	Pinagpalang Ama: Eat Bulaga! Lenten Drama Special 2015	Edward
2015	Sabado Badoo	Cameo Featured Footage
2015	Cash Cab Philippines	Host
2016	Dalangin ng Ama: Eat Bulaga! Lenten Special 2016	PO2 Ramil Abquilan
2016	Pepito Manaloto	Jingo Ismol
2017	Kapatid: Eat Bulaga! Lenten Special 2017	Aldo
2018	Eat Bulaga Lenten Special: Pamilya	Paco
2019	Eat Bulaga Lenten Special: Bulawan	Erwin
2020	Bangon Talentadong Pinoy	Host
2020	Paano Kita Mapasasalamatan?	Program Director
2026	The Good Doctor	

== Discography ==
=== Albums ===
Year	Title	Label
2006	Lovespeak – No Ordinary Love	Vicor Music
2006	One Heart, One Hand	Sony BMG Music Entertainment

=== Songs ===
- "I'll Have to Say I Love You in a Song"
- "Ikaw ang Pag-ibig"

== Awards and recognitions ==
- "Anak TV Seal Award" – 2010 with wife Judy Ann Santos
- Winner, Male Star of the Night – 2009 MTRCB TV Awards
- Winner, German Moreno Youth Achievement Award 2008 – FAMAS Awards Night 2008
- Winner, Best Public Affairs Program Host "Y-Speak" – 2007 KBP Golden Dove Awards

Year	Award giving body	Category	Nominated work	Results
2006	FAMAS Awards	Best Actor	Kasal, Kasali, Kasalo	Nominated
2006	FAP Awards	Best Supporting Actor	Kutob	Nominated
2007	Aliw Awards	Best Emcee	—N/a	Won
2007	Gawad Urian Award	Best Actor	—N/a	Nominated
2008	Aliw Awards	Best Emcee	—N/a	Won
2009	Anak TV Seal Awards	Most Admired Male TV Personality	—N/a	Won
2009	Aliw Awards	Best Emcee	—N/a	Won
2009	1st MTRCB TV Awards	Male Star of the Night	—N/a	Won
2009	PMPC Star Awards for Television	Best Talent Show Host	—N/a	Won
2010	Aliw Awards	Best Male Emcee	—N/a	Won
2010	Anak TV Awards	Favorite Anak TV Makabata Star	—N/a	Won
2011	Golden Screen TV Awards	Outstanding Original Reality Competition Program Host	—N/a	Won
2011	PMPC Star Awards for Movies	Best Actor	—N/a	Nominated
2017	Reader's Digest Trusted Brand Awards	Most Trusted Entertainment Presenter	—N/a	Won
2018	Reader's Digest Trusted Brand Awards	Most Trusted Entertainment/Variety Show Presenter	—N/a	Won
