= Christian Esguerra =

Filipino journalist, television news anchor and podcaster

- Other name: Facts First
- Education: University of Santo Tomas (BA, MA)
- Occupations: Podcaster; TV host; news anchor; journalist

YouTube information
- Channel: Christian Esguerra
- Years active: 2020–present
- Genres: Politics; Podcast
- Subscribers: 554 thousand
- Views: 199.16 million
- Last updated: May 21, 2025
- Website: factsfirstpodcast.com

Christian V. Esguerra is a Filipino political journalist and educator. He currently hosts Facts First, a political podcast streaming live five times a week, where he tackles current issues in Philippine politics and governance. A persistent critic of disinformation activities, Esguerra was the former anchor and managing editor of the political talk program After the Fact on ABS-CBN News Channel (ANC), launched in May 2020. He started his career in journalism as a reporter for the Philippine Daily Inquirer in 2000, and joined ABS-CBN in 2015 as a news correspondent and anchor.

Esguerra is also an assistant professor teaching political reporting and journalism ethics at the University of Santo Tomas (UST), where he is also a researcher at the Research Center for Culture, Arts, and Humanities. Outside of UST, Esguerra's research project titled "Captive Congress: Interest Group Capture in the Philippine House of Representatives" was funded by the DLSU Southeast Asian Research Program as part of the program's Democracy Discourse Series.

In 2019, Esguerra received the Award of Distinction from the Center for Media Freedom and Responsibility, as well as the Titus Brandsma Award for Emergent Leadership in Journalism. In 2020, he was awarded a Marshall McLuhan Fellowship.

== Education ==
Esguerra graduated cum laude with a Bachelor of Arts in Journalism at the University of Santo Tomas in 2000. He finished his master's degree in Theology, major in Social Pastoral Communication, at the same university in 2011.

== Career ==
Esguerra started his career in journalism as a reporter for the Philippine Daily Inquirer from 2000 to 2015. In 2006, he was a journalism fellow at Seoul National University. In 2008, he was a research fellow at the University of San Francisco. In 2015, he left the Inquirer to join ABS-CBN's roster as a news correspondent and news anchor. He was the anchor and managing editor of ANC's Early Edition from 2018 to 2021, and the same for the hard-hitting political talk show After the Fact from 2020 to 2022. Currently, Esguerra hosts the streaming political podcast Facts First. A vocal critic of disinformation and political pressure on journalists and mainstream journalism media, Esguerra is also a trustee of the Journalism Studies Association of the Philippines (JSAP).

On 30 March 2022, Esguerra announced via Twitter the termination of After the Fact, citing the "prevailing political climate" as the reason for ending the program. Commenters on Esguerra's tweet saw the show's termination as a capitulation by ABS-CBN's executives to pressure from the Rodrigo Duterte government. In 2020, ABS-CBN's franchise was not renewed by the Rodrigo Duterte government-leaning supermajority in the Philippine Congress, which forced the main terrestrial channel to go off-air. Election lawyer Emil Marañon lamented ABS-CBN's "dropping" of Esguerra, saying Esguerra is "one of the best journalists in the country who dare ask the hard questions," writing further that "his brand of journalism is what gives ABS-CBN the credibility it enjoys." Marañon further noted that this was a "bad call."

After After the Fact came to an end, Esguerra shifted his focus to Facts First with Christian Esguerra, a podcast program where he dives into the most important political issues in the Philippines. He regularly sits down with key figures like former Presidential Adviser Ronald Llamas, former Senator Antonio Trillanes, economist Cielo Magno, and others from the political and academic world. His interviews stand out for their depth and thoughtfulness, with Esguerra’s style often praised for bringing out meaningful, candid responses from his guests.

== Awards ==
- Gawad Dr. Pio Valenzuela for Excellence in Journalism, City of Valenzuela, 2019
- Titus Brandsma Award for Emergent Leadership in Journalism, 2019
- Award of Distinction – Center for Media Freedom and Responsibility (CMFR), 2019
- Marshall McLuhan Fellowship, 2020

== Selected publications ==
- Esguerra, C.V. (2020). "How strongmen influence digital narratives in the age of COVID-19: The case of Rodrigo Duterte," In Challenges of Communication in the Digital Age. College of Social Culture and Media, Torun. (Book chapter)
- Esguerra, C.V. (2019). "The role of the Catholic Church in Philippine independence and democracy." In Catholics and Independence: Opportunities and Threats. College of Social Culture and Media, Torun. (Book chapter)
- Bernardo, P. X. J. C., Lechuga, T. S., & Esguerra, C. V. (2019). “Ethical dilemmas of Filipino reporters during the 2016 Philippine presidential campaign trail: A phenomenology.” Journal of Media and Communication Research 11(3), 23–40.

== Personal life ==
Esguerra married Naomi Bernardo, a doctor, on July 24, 2021.
