= Cathy Yang =

Filipina business journalist

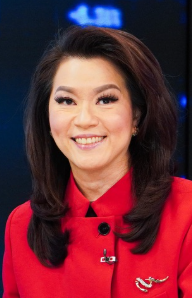
- Yang in 2026
- Born: Catherine Yap; February 1, 1971 (age 55); Manila, Philippines
- Other name: Cathy Yap-Yang
- Education: De La Salle University (AB)
- Occupations: Journalist; talk show host; business executive
- Years active: 1992–2020; 2023–present
- Title: First Vice President and Group Communications Officer of PLDT (2020–2024); Head of Programs at Cignal TV (2025–present)
- Spouse: Gilbert Yang
- Children: 2

Catherine Yap Yang (born February 1, 1971) is a Filipina business journalist and executive who has worked in various international news outfits across the Asia-Pacific region over the course of 15 years. She is currently the Head of Programs at Cignal TV and a presenter on Cignal TV's One News. Previously, she served as the head of PLDT's corporate communications group.

== Background ==
She graduated with an AB Communication Arts degree from the De La Salle University in 1991. After graduation, Yap-Yang joined ABS-CBN and tenured for eight years (1992–2000) as reporter, researcher and pinch-hitter for the former Philippine vice president (and now journalist) Noli de Castro on TV Patrol. She succeedingly became a business news presenter for several Sarimanok News Network (SNN, later called the ABS-CBN News Channel or ANC) shows, such as Stock Market Live, The World Tonight, and The Weekend News. She also co-hosted the show, Usapang Business in tandem with Ces Drilon on ABS-CBN.

In 2000, the Reuters Foundation sent Yang to the Oxford University to take a Masters in Journalism and in Cardiff University in the United Kingdom. Months later, she joined Bloomberg TV in Tokyo, and then moved afterward to Hong Kong.

Yang also joined Reuters Television as their news anchor from 2010 to 2013, and CCTV News as their reporter covering the whole of Hong Kong from 2013 to 2015. In 2015, Yang re-joined ABS-CBN as the face of its business news coverage, as well as becoming its managing editor. She served as the anchor of ANC's Market Edge and of Business Nightly (replacing Warren de Guzman) in September 2015.

On August 6, 2020, Yang joined PLDT as First Vice President and Group Communications Officer. She also oversaw the communications needs of the MVP Group of Companies, which includes Smart Communications and TV5 Network. She voluntarily retired on December 1, 2024.

On April 21, 2023, it was reported that Yang would be making her TV comeback via Cignal TV's One News as the host of a new interview program titled Thought Leaders, which began airing in May 2023. On January 1, 2025, she assumed the position of Head of Programs at Cignal TV, Inc. while continuing her duties as the presenter of Thought Leaders and the business morning news program Money Talks with Cathy Yang.

== Personal life ==
She is married to dermatologist Gilbert Yang, with whom she has two daughters, Angelica and Christine.

== Recognition ==
- Asian Television Awards – Best TV News Presenter 2019
- Asian Academy Awards – Best TV News Anchor 2019
- Asian Television Awards – Best TV Newscaster (2001, 2002, 2003)
- British Council – Fleetstreet Award
- De La Salle University – Excellence in Media Award
