= Pinoy jazz =

Style of music in the Philippines

Pinoy jazz refers to the blend of traditional American jazz with strong Filipino musical style. Starting in the early 20th century with the US colonial rule, Filipinos were introduced to American jazz as a form of "imperial labor", by US forces. While often viewed as a musical genre, Pinoy Jazz has been described as "imperial labor" by Theodore Gonzalves and Frederick Schenker.

== Jazz and U.S. colonial rule in the Philippines ==
=== Filipinos in America ===
In the early 20th century, many Filipinos were migrating to the United States, specifically the West Coast, for musical labor. Filipino musicians were widely connected to the colonial project. Some performed as part of the Philippine Constabulary Band for American expositions, led by Walter H. Loving, an African American soldier and conductor. They played mostly Western military and classical music or tunes, but it proved their musical skills to the Americans. Scholar Mary Talusan argued that American audiences did not appreciate it for the artistry or hard work of Filipinos, but rather because they were gaining success in assimilation and U.S. tutelage through their attempts of colonizing the Philippines. In fact, Filipinos have been well influenced by Westernization for centuries, as they were colonized by the Spanish and had developed their own style for bands. Filipino musicians and laborers also became frequents in taxi-dance halls, where patrons would pay for dances with American jazz and swing music. Though these became sites of intense racial conflict, it gave working-class Filipinos to engage with jazz culture.

Through the 1940-50s, Filipinos soon gained active recognition in the Fillmore district of San Francisco, or the "Harlem of the West," as stated by Carlos Zialcita, a prominent figure in the San Francisco Filipino American Jazz Festival. Notable Filipino musicians like Flip Nuñez (pianist) and Vince Gomez (bassist) performed alongside African American musicians in the neighborhood.

=== U.S. colonialism in the Philippines ===
One of the biggest ways that Filipinos got influenced and involved in Jazz in the Philippines was through the Philippine-American War from 1899 to 1902. The U.S. used the formation of the Philippine Constabulary Band and its success as a way to demonstrate the positives and impact of Filipinos joining US civilization. White Americans did not serve authentic promotion for this, as the conductor, Walter H. Loving was a Black man, and it would have disproved their notion of white authority over Filipinos. Loving served as a strong bridge between the African American musical leadership and Filipino musicians. In addition to the Philippine Constabulary Band, an African American regiment called the Ninth Cavalry maintained a jazz band and minstrel troupe of soldier-musicians to entertain the white soldiers. Because these African American soldiers and Filipinos shared the connection and understanding of discrimination, an allegiance formed between many of them. Filipinos also picked up on music played by the American soldiers, such as "A Hot Time in the Old Town Tonight" by Louis Armstrong, and began to appropriate the music and adapted it to funeral parades.

== Jazz as labor and mobility in colonial Asia ==
=== Filipino musicians and transnational jazz ===
Filipinos used their proficiency in jazz to migrate to major port cities in Asia, like Shanghai, Surabaya, Singapore, and Tokyo to aid economic displacement. Manila, capital of the Philippines, played a major role in this circuit, as it served as a port to distribute and transport Filipino musicians who were well-versed in Tin Pan Alley Hits and jazz principles to "contact zones" with international audiences of Asia. These migrant musicians were named "Filipino seekers of fortune," a term coined by journalist Ramon Navas. The wages abroad were higher than domestic earnings, and after the massive depression, thousands of workers were prompted to seek employment abroad. Colonial newspapers started to promote proficiency in jazz as a way to get "easy" money, and instruments for the genre were marketed as investments to allow new musicians to enter the workforce easily. This reinforced jazz as a commercial trade than simply an artistic expression, and quickly spread as a labor force in major cities in Asia. They began to work on cruises and transpacific steamship lines, where journalist Burnet Hershey said "Filipino orchestras are the interpreters of jazz on the Pacific Ocean." Because their wage demand was lower than White or African American performers, the United States Shipping Board replaced American jazz bands with Filipino bands as a cost-effective labor decision. Their reputation became so apparent that American musicians in Asia became infuriated at how Filipino musicians were conquering the market.
