= Picture! Picture! =

Philippine television game show

- Title card
- Genre: Game show
- Developed by: Marcelo "Loi" Landicho
- Written by: Loi Landicho; TJ Carbonel; Augie Rivera
- Directed by: Rico Gutierrez
- Presented by: Ryan Agoncillo
- Country of origin: Philippines
- Original language: Tagalog
- No. of episodes: 28

Production
- Executive producer: Helen Santiago-Benito
- Production locations: GMA Network Center, Quezon City, Philippines
- Editors: Allan Ambrad; Edwin Thaddeus Borja
- Camera setup: Multiple-camera setup
- Running time: 60 minutes
- Production company: GMA Entertainment TV

Original release
- Network: GMA Network
- Release: November 23, 2013 – June 15, 2014

Picture! Picture! is a Philippine television game show broadcast by GMA Network. Hosted by Ryan Agoncillo, it premiered on November 23, 2013. The show concluded on June 15, 2014, with a total of 28 episodes.

== Host ==
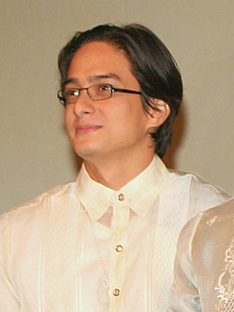
Ryan Agoncillo serves as a host.

- Ryan Agoncillo
- Choi Da-seul

== Ratings ==
According to AGB Nielsen Philippines' Mega Manila household television ratings, the pilot episode of Picture! Picture! earned a 24.4% rating. The final episode scored an 11.4% rating.

== Accolades ==
Accolades received by Picture! Picture!
Year	Award	Category	Recipient	Result	Ref.
2014	28th PMPC Star Awards for Television	Best Game Show	Picture! Picture!	Nominated	
2014	28th PMPC Star Awards for Television	Best Game Show Host	Ryan Agoncillo	Nominated	
