= Karina Constantino David =

Filipino civil servant (1946–2019)

- Constanino David at her daughter Kara's wedding in 2018

Chairman of the Civil Service Commission
- In office February 23, 2001 – February 2, 2008
- President: Gloria Macapagal Arroyo
- Preceded by: Corazon Alma G. de Leon
- Succeeded by: Ricardo Saludo

Personal details
- Born: Karina Roxas Constantino; March 19, 1946
- Died: May 7, 2019 (aged 73)
- Resting place: Loyola Memorial Park Marikina, Philippines
- Spouse: Randy David (m. 1968)
- Children: 4, including Kara
- Parent(s): Renato Constantino; Letizia Roxas
- Relatives: Pablo Virgilio David (brother-in-law); Karmina Constantino (niece)
- Education: University of the Philippines Diliman (BA)
- Occupation: Civil servant, activist

Karina Roxas Constantino David (March 19, 1946 – May 7, 2019) was a Filipino activist, public servant, and musician best known for being a former chairperson of the Civil Service Commission of the Philippines, and for her opposition to the Martial Law dictatorship of Ferdinand Marcos as part of the activist duo "Inang Laya". She also served as the chairperson of the Career Executive Service Board, a government entity supervising the top management personnel of the Philippine government. She was a member of the Government Service Insurance System (GSIS) Board of Trustees.

David was the wife of professor emeritus Randy David of the University of the Philippines Diliman and daughter of the renowned historian Renato Constantino. She was also the mother of journalist Kara David and UP Diliman geology professor Dr. Carlos Primo David.

== Early life and education ==
Daughter of historian Renato Constantino, David earned a Bachelor of Arts in Sociology at the University of the Philippines Diliman in 1966. She completed academic requirements in the Master of Arts in Sociology program (orals lacking) from the same university in 1968, but was not awarded that degree. She and her husband Randy David eventually pursued a Master of Arts in Economic and Social Studies from The Victoria University of Manchester in England until 1974, but both had to return to the Philippines on account of martial law, and were unable complete their degrees there.

== Early career ==
David started working in 1966 as a Teaching Assistant in the Department of Sociology of the University of the Philippines Diliman. She became an assistant professor from 1970 to 1975. In 1986, she was appointed undersecretary in the Department of Social Welfare and Development. From 1975, David has been a professor of community development at the university's College of Social Work and Community Development.

== Civil society and private sector work ==
David held leadership posts at the Caucus of Development NGO Networks (president, 1989–1998); Women's Action Network for Development (vice chairperson, 1990–1998); Partnership of Philippine Support Service Agencies (chairperson, 1989–1995); Independent Commission on Population and the Quality of Life (commissioner, 1992–1996); and People's Forum for Habitat II (national convenor, 1995–1996). David also served as consultant to poverty and women's program policy planning of the Asian and Pacific Development Centre.

In 1989, she was a consultant for the women's mission of GTZ or Deutsche Gessellscahft Fur Technische Zusammenarbeit and the Canadian International Development Agency (CIDA).

From 1988 to 1989, David was the over-all consultant of the Philippine Development Plan for Women at the National Commission on the Role of Filipino Women (NCRFW). David rendered consultancy services at the NCRFW from 1995 to 1996 for the Philippine Plan for Gender Responsive Development.

She was also the executive director of Harnessing Self-Reliant Initiatives and Knowledge (HASIK) from 1988 to 1998. HASIK is a non-government organization involved in urban poor empowerment, gender development, protection of children and adolescents, and housing and livelihood projects.

From 1997 to 1998, David was the president of Eco-Shelter, Inc., a private company involved in shelter construction and development of alternative housing materials.

From 1999 until her appointment to the CSC, David was president of Property Solutions, Inc., a private company that offers innovative and alternative interventions to various property issues.

== Housing and Urban Development Coordinating Council chair ==
David chaired the Housing and Urban Development Coordinating Council (HUDCC) from 1998 to 1999, having been appointed by President Joseph Estrada as his Presidential Adviser on Housing. In this capacity, she made housing and urban development goals and strategies, monitored targets, and broadened private sector participation. She also proposed legislation and made policies for asset disposition. She was heading the boards of all shelter agencies in the Philippines.

== Civil Service Commission chair ==
David was appointed by President Gloria Macapagal Arroyo on February 23, 2001, as chairperson of the Civil Service Commission (CSC), succeeding Corazon Alma G. De Leon.

In her capacity as CSC chair, Constantino-David drew some controversy when she asserted in January 2008 that 40% of 3,000 government officials, including Cabinet officials, are unqualified to hold their positions: "these officials, consisting of managers, directors, assistant secretaries and undersecretaries, do not have the appropriate educational background and skills to perform their duties well; they don't have the correct educational skills and appropriate background plus experience to perform their respective duties well."

== Family ==
- Father: Renato Constantino, a well-known Filipino historian.
- Mother: Letizia Roxas Constantino, an esteemed writer, historian, and academic, who co-wrote some of Renato Constantino books.
- Husband: Randy David, a Filipino sociologist.
- Children: Kara David, a broadcast journalist; Carlos Primo David, a geology professor at the University of the Philippines; Nadya; and Jika.
- Grandchildren: Julia, Jacinta, Xavier, Alonso, and Lila.

== Other affiliations ==
David was an active member of the Philippine Sociological Society, the Human Development Network, and the Asia-Pacific Development Journal. She also became a trustee of the Government Service Insurance System (GSIS).

== Musical activities ==
Since 1981, David has been the composer and guitarist of Inang Laya, a female duo that performed and recorded progressive, feminist songs. Inang Laya cut a number of albums in the local entertainment scene.

== International award ==
On April 15, 2008, Karina Constantino-David received the World Bank's 2008 Jit Gill Memorial Award for Outstanding Public Service. David battled formidable obstacles to defend meritocracy and improve civil service pay as Chair of the Civil Service Commission of the Philippines until February."
