= Paano Kita Mapasasalamatan? (TV program) =

2020–21 Philippine television documentary show

- Title card
- Genre: Documentary
- Written by: Andrian Legaspi; Bridgette Ann Rebuca
- Directed by: Ryan dela Cruz Quimpo; Carlo Enciso Catu; Patricia Tardecilla; Ryan Agoncillo
- Presented by: Judy Ann Santos
- Theme music composer: George Canseco
- Opening theme: "Paano Kita Mapasasalamatan" by Juris
- Country of origin: Philippines
- Original language: Tagalog
- No. of episodes: 53

Production
- Executive producers: Carlo Katigbak; Cory Vidanes; Laurenti Dyogi; Roldeo Endrinal
- Producer: Ronald Dantes Atianzar
- Running time: 60 minutes
- Production companies: ABS-CBN Studios; ABS-CBN News and Current Affairs; Dreamscape Entertainment

Original release
- Network: Kapamilya Channel (June 13, 2020 – June 26, 2021); A2Z (October 24, 2020 – June 26, 2021)
- Release: June 13, 2020 – June 26, 2021

Related
- Tao Po!

Paano Kita Mapasasalamatan? (transl. How Can I Thank You?) is a Philippine television documentary show broadcast by Kapamilya Channel. Directed by Ryan Agoncillo and was hosted by Judy Ann Santos. It aired on the network's Yes Weekend! line up from June 13, 2020 to June 26, 2021, replacing Home Sweetie Home.

== Final host ==
- Judy Ann Santos

== See also ==
- List of A2Z (TV channel) original programming
- List of Kapamilya Channel original programming
