= Ricky Carandang =

Filipino journalist

Presidential Communications Development and Strategic Planning Office
- In office July 30, 2010 – December 31, 2013
- President: Benigno Aquino III
- Preceded by: Position created
- Succeeded by: Manolo Quezon

Personal details
- Born: Ramon Arellano Carandang; September 2, 1967 (age 59)
- Education: Ateneo de Manila University (AB)
- Occupation: Cabinet Secretary
- Profession: Journalist; News Anchor
- Website: rickycarandang.com

Ramon "Ricky" Arellano Carandang (born September 2, 1967) is a Filipino journalist and former government official. Notable for his tenure as a news correspondent and anchor for ABS-CBN and the ANC, Carandang resigned from broadcasting on July 9, 2010, to join the government as Secretary of the Presidential Communications Development and Strategic Planning Office (PCDSPO) under President Benigno Aquino III. He is currently Vice President and Head of Integrated Corporate Communications at First Philippine Holdings Corporation, First Gen Corporation, and Energy Development Corporation.

== Early life and career ==
Ricky Carandang was born as Ramon Arellano Carandang on September 2, 1967, in Manila, Philippines. He is the son of Dr. Brigido Carandang Jr., former president and dean of St. Luke's College of Medicine, and Dr. Maria Lourdes Arellano-Carandang, a clinical psychologist and Founder of the MLAC Institute for Children and Families.

He spent part of his early childhood in Sacramento, California, attending Isadore Cohen Elementary School. He later returned to the Philippines and completed his high school and college education at the Ateneo de Manila University, earning a Bachelor of Arts in management economics in 1989.

Throughout the 1990s, Carandang worked in the business sector as a stockbroker with Pryce Securities, HG Asia Securities, and Kim Eng Securities.

=== Media career ===
Carandang began his media career as a radio anchor for DZAR Angel Radyo in 1993. By 2000, he had become a prominent news anchor for the ANC, co-hosting the evening news program The Rundown, hosting the national affairs talk show The Big Picture, and serving as a field reporter for ABS-CBN's flagship news programs TV Patrol and Bandila.

== Public service ==
In 2010, Carandang became the first head of the Presidential Communications Development and Strategic Planning Office (PCDSPO), established at the beginning of President Benigno S. Aquino III’s administration to oversee presidential messaging and strategic planning. He resigned on December 12, 2013, with his departure effective at the end of the year.

== Awards and distinctions ==
Carandang was named “Broadcaster of the Year” by the Rotary Club of Manila in 2010. He also served as President and Business Editor of Newsbreak Magazine from 2000 to 2004.
