= Boyet Sison =

Filipino sports commentator and news anchor (1963–2022)

- Born: Jose Javelona Sison; April 25, 1963; Manila, Philippines
- Died: April 16, 2022 (aged 58); Quezon City, Philippines
- Other names: Papa B, Boyet
- Years active: 1996–2022
- Agent: ABS-CBN Corporation (2006–22)
- Notable credit(s): DWRT (1996); DZMM (2004–2020)

Jose "Boyet" Javelona Sison (April 25, 1963 – April 16, 2022) was a Filipino sports commentator and news anchor.

== Early life and education ==
Boyet Sison was born as Jose Javelona Sison on April 25, 1963, in Manila, to Ady Sison and Rebecca Javelona. He attended Lourdes School of Mandaluyong.

== Career ==
Also referred to as "Papa B" in the broadcast industry, Sison began his career as a disc jockey for numerous clubs in Metro Manila. In the 1990s, Sison had a break in his career when he guest-hosted in Saturday Night Live (not confused with the American late-night comedy and variety show of the same name) of DWRT 99.5. In 2000, Sison became a radio play-by-play panelist for games of the Philippine Basketball Association (PBA) and went on to work as the coliseum announcer for the PBA from 2005 to January 2012. He also was the ring announcer for the Universal Reality Combat Championship and an anchor for the National Collegiate Athletic Association.

Sison co-hosted the ANC television sports program Hardball with Bill Velasco and the DZMM radio show Fastbreak with basketball legend Freddie Webb until 2020 due to the COVID-19 pandemic and the ABS-CBN shutdown.

His last television stint was in the flagship newscast TV Patrol, as the host of the segment "Alam N'yo Ba?" where he replaced Kim Atienza for the general knowledge segment role on November 25, 2021, until Ariel Rojas was the permanent replacement to Atienza's weather forecast segment. He would continue hosting the segment until his passing, with ABS-CBN News's Jeff Canoy reporting on what would have been Sison's last assignment for the segment: the closure of the College of the Holy Spirit Manila. He was replaced by Migs Bustos for the segment on June 30, 2022, coinciding with the inauguration of President Bongbong Marcos on that day until 2023.

== Death ==
Sison died on April 16, 2022, at age 58, just nine days before his 59th birthday due to a cardiac arrest after undergoing intestinal surgery two days earlier while confined at the De Los Santos Medical Center in Quezon City.

== Filmography ==
=== Television ===
Year	Title	Role	Ref.
2006–19	Hardball	Anchor	
2008–20	Gametime	Anchor	
2021–22	TV Patrol	Segment anchor	

=== Radio ===
Year	Title	Role
1996	Saturday Night Live	Anchor
2014–20	Fastbreak	Anchor
