= Metro Channel =

Philippine pay television channel

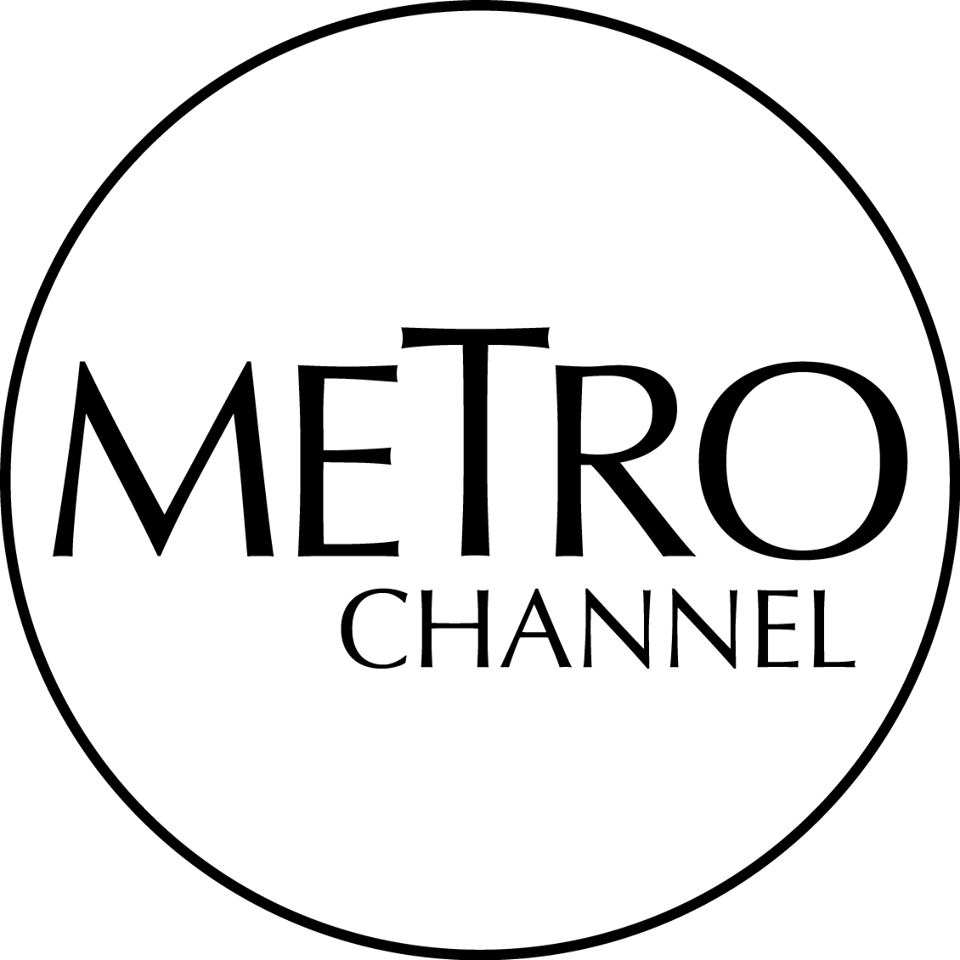
- Logo used since 2018
- Country: Philippines
- Broadcast area: Nationwide
- Headquarters: ABS-CBN Broadcasting Center, Diliman, Quezon City, Philippines

Programming
- Languages: English (main); Filipino (secondary)
- Picture format: 1080i HDTV (downscaled to 16:9 480i for the SDTV feed)

Ownership
- Owner: ABS-CBN Corporation
- Parent: Creative Programs Inc.
- Sister channels: Under ABS-CBN: A2Z (via ZOE TV); All TV (via AMBS); ANC; Cinema One; Cine Mo!; Jeepney TV; Kapamilya Channel; Knowledge Channel; Myx; Myx (America); DZMM Radyo Patrol 630; DZMM TeleRadyo; TFC; Favorite Music Radio

History
- Launched: April 2, 2018; 8 years ago
- Replaced: Disney XD Asia (Cignal Only) (2014–2021)
- Former names: Lifestyle (Network) (1999–2018)

Links
- Website: https://metro.style/

Availability

Terrestrial
- SkyCable Metro Manila: Channel 52 (SD); Channel 174 (HD)
- SkyTV Metro Manila: Channel 188 (HD)
- Cignal TV Nationwide: Channel 69
- G Sat Nationwide: Channel 20

Metro Channel (formerly Lifestyle (Network) and stylized in all capital letters) is a Philippine pay television channel based in Quezon City. It is owned by Creative Programs Inc., a subsidiary of media conglomerate ABS-CBN Corporation. Its programming is composed primarily of lifestyle and entertainment shows targeted to upscale women. The channel was officially launched on April 2, 2018, and it was named after Metro Magazine, one of the leading lifestyle magazines in the country published by ABS-CBN Publishing. The channel became available on G Sat Channel 70 on October 5, 2020 and on January 4, 2021, on Cignal Channel 69 replacing the channel space of Disney XD Asia. A video on demand service for Metro Channel shows are available via iWant.

== Programming blocks ==
- Home & Living - focused on home improvements, room makeovers, interior design and modern living.
- Food & Travel - focused on food, travel and adventure.
- Fashion & Style - focused on fashion and style.
- Entertainment & Glamour - focused on the best entertainment and glamour.

== Original programming, special features and segments ==
- At The Table (Season 2) (formerly Chasing Flavors; 2017–present)
- Beached (2018–present)
- Casa Zobel De Ayala (Season 2) (2017–present)
- Driven (2018–present)
- In The Metro (2018–present)
- Metro Best K-Drama Awards (2020–present)
- Pia's Postcards (2018–present)

== See also ==
- ABS-CBN
- Lifestyle Network
