= Inang Laya =

Filipino protest music duo

- Origin: Manila, Philippines
- Genres: Folk rock
- Years active: 1981–present
- Members: Becky Demetillo-Abraham; Karina Constantino David (deceased)

Inang Laya (Filipino: Mother Freedom) is a Filipino folk music duo known for its activist lyrics, particularly its strong opposition to the Martial Law dictatorship of Ferdinand Marcos.
