= Gretchen Fullido =

Filipina news presenter and model

- Born: Gretchen Marie Gumabao Fullido; June 4, 1984 (age 42); Philippines
- Education: University of the Philippines Diliman
- Occupations: Broadcaster; Anchor; Model
- Years active: 2004–present
- Notable credit: TV Patrol

YouTube information
- Channel: It's a Greta Life!
- Years active: 2018–present
- Genres: vlogs, talk show, news
- Subscribers: 11,000
- Views: 1.13 million
- Last updated: August 4, 2026

Gretchen Marie Gumabao Fullido (Tagalog: [ˈgrɛtʃɛn fuˈlɪdɔ]; born June 4, 1984) is a Filipino presenter and model. She rose to prominence after hosting and guest appearances on several talk shows, televised competitions and sports events. Fullido is the current presenter for the Star Patrol entertainment segment of TV Patrol, and is under contract with ABS-CBN and TFC.

== Career ==
=== 2004–2009 ===
In 2004, Fullido started her career as a courtside reporter for the UAAP until 2007. She was also a radio host for Sports Talk and Chismax: Chismis to the Max on DZMM and became a reporter for TV Patrol World in 2008.

=== 2010–present: TV Patrol ===
On November 8, 2010, Fullido replaced Phoemela Barranda as a segment anchor for Star Patrol.

In 2013, Fullido later reported on scores and the stars attending games for UAAP Season '76, and was presenter for Celebrity Basketball Match. She again appeared in It's Showtime's fourth anniversary celebration, with a guest appearance in the last two episodes of the weeklong special.

== Controversy ==
On October 5, 2018, Fullido filed sexual harassment and libel complaints against ABS-CBN executive Cheryl Favila and ABS-CBN News segment producer Maricar Asprec. She also filed suit against news reporter Marie Lozano, who allegedly “besmirched her reputation” in saying she had filed the sexual harassment complaints to leverage her employment status in the network. Fullido charged the two executives had sent her text messages with sexual innuendoes and requesting sexual favors. She also accused them of making it difficult for her to work as an anchor and reporter for TV Patrol when she rejected their inappropriate advances.

Fullido also accused journalist Ces Drilon of victim-blaming after the latter allegedly said Fullido deserved to be harassed after wearing a bikini to boost TV Patrol ratings. In March 2019, the Quezon City Prosecutor junked Fullido’s libel raps against Lozano and Drilon.

== Personal life ==
Fullido is the cousin of the Gumabao siblings Paolo, Marco, Kat, and Michele. She is also a niece of former actor Dennis Roldan.

Fullido graduated from Immaculate Conception Academy - Greenhills in San Juan City. She later finished at the University of the Philippines Diliman in Quezon City.

== Filmography ==
=== Television ===
Year	Title	Character
2007–2014	Sports Talk	Co-host
2009–2020	Chismax: Chismis to the Max	Co-host
2010–2011	The Wrap	Host
2010–present	TV Patrol	Segment anchor
2013	It's Showtime	Guest
2016	Magandang Buhay	Guest
2022	Barangay PIE Silog	Co-host

== Radio shows ==
Year	Title	Character
2004–2014	Sports Talk	Host
2009–2020	Chismax: Chismis to the Max	Host
