= ABS-CBN News Channel =

Philippine pay television channel

- Logo used since 2015
- Country: Philippines
- Broadcast area: Worldwide
- Network: ABS-CBN News and Current Affairs
- Headquarters: Newsroom and Studio 7, ABS-CBN Broadcasting Center, Diliman, Quezon City

Programming
- Languages: English (main); Filipino (secondary)
- Picture format: 1080i HDTV (downscaled to 16:9 480i/576i for the SDTV feed)

Ownership
- Owner: ABS-CBN Corporation
- Sister channels: Cinema One; Cine Mo! Jeepney TV; Kapamilya Channel; Metro Channel; Knowledge Channel; Myx; Myx (US); DZMM TeleRadyo; The Filipino Channel

History
- Launched: May 1, 1996; 30 years ago
- Former names: Sky News (1995–1996); Sarimanok Channel 37 (1996); Sarimanok News Network (1996–1999)

Links
- Website: www.abs-cbn.com/news

Availability

Terrestrial
- Sky Cable Metro Manila: Channel 27 (SD); Channel 182 (HD)
- SkyTV Metro Manila: Channel 61 (HD)
- G Sat Nationwide: Channel 39
- Cignal Nationwide: Channel 27 (SD)

Streaming media
- iWant (Philippines): Watch Live (requires active monthly subscription)
- iWant (Global): Watch Live

The ABS-CBN News Channel, commonly referred to as ANC, is a Philippine 24/7 English language pay television news and business channel owned by ABS-CBN Corporation. It was launched in 1996 as the first all-news network in English language in the Philippines. The majority of its programs are produced by ABS-CBN News and Current Affairs.

ANC is broadcast from the ANC studio at the ABS-CBN Newsroom and Studio 7 of the ABS-CBN Broadcasting Center in the Philippines. It is available domestically via pay television and select direct-to-home satellite providers (including Converge ICT's Vision and Streamtech's Planet Cable), as well as via livestream. An international feed called ANC Global is also available worldwide as part of TFC premium channels via cable, satellite, iWant and TFC IPTV.

== History ==
The 2014 variant logo of ANC adapted from the 2011 logo used until October 25, 2015

The ABS-CBN News Channel was originally established in 1996 as the Sarimanok News Network or SNN. SNN was the brainchild of the late Eugenio Lopez, Jr. who envisioned a 24-hour television network that would become the primary source of news and information for Filipinos. On May 1, 1996, SNN was first offered on Sky Cable. Back then the channel served the viewers through two major news programs, Dateline Philippines and Primetime News, while short news advisories aired throughout the day.

On March 7, 1998, SNN also covered the Metropolitan Basketball Association games until the merger with Sky Cable's news division.

To enhance its resources and strengthen its position as the primary news channel for the Filipinos, SNN in 1998 merged with Sky News, another Lopez-owned cable news channel that specialized in business news. The merger of the two networks paved the way for the formation of the country's first 24-hour news channel offering the latest in local and foreign news, business information, sports, weather updates and lifestyle. On October 11, 1999, the network changed its name to ABS-CBN News Channel or ANC.

In the years that followed, ANC established its name through its coverage of key events in the Philippines including the impeachment trial of Joseph Estrada, the Sipadan hostage crisis, the Oakwood mutiny, and EDSA Dos and Tres. ANC and ABS-CBN was also the first to reveal the Joseph Estrada's "brown envelope" controversy, Corazon Aquino's death, the Maguindanao massacre, and Hubert Webb's acquittal.

In November 2011, ANC, together with ABS-CBNnews.com and YouTube brought the YouTube World View event to the Philippines with an exclusive and one-on-one interview with the Philippine President Benigno Aquino III in Malacañang Palace. The questions were submitted and voted by YouTube users from all over the world.

On July 18, 2013, ANC announced a partnership with Yahoo!, which saw the introduction of a Yahoo! portal featuring content from ANC (which will remain separate from the main ABS-CBN News website), and would also allow ANC content to be featured on Yahoo! News Philippines. The partnership marks Yahoo's first partnership with a television news outlet outside of the United States, where Yahoo! has recently established a similar content partnership with ABC News. This joint-venture website was discontinued after it was revealed that Yahoo Philippines was discontinued in June 2015 (and thus redirecting the website to the Singaporean edition of Yahoo including the Malaysian edition) as an initiative to streamline "internal workflows" and currently redirects users to the ABS-CBNnews.com website. Before that partnership with Yahoo, the channel had its own dedicated website, ANCnews.tv until 2013.

In the early part of 2015, ANC has begun using English subtitles for the Tagalog soundbytes on newscasts and public affairs programs from ABS-CBN.

On October 26, 2015, ANC went into a major overhaul in its broadcast design, including the refurbished rhombus logo and the red-blue schemed new title cards for the channel's major newscasts. As part of the relaunch, ANC opened a new studio in 8 Rockwell in Rockwell Center in Makati, aside from their studio and newsroom in Quezon City. The Rockwell studio is used by programs such as Mornings @ ANC, Headstart with Karen Davila and #NoFilter a political program hosted by Teodoro Locsin Jr. and Professor Prospero de Vera of University of the Philippines. ANC also launched the new programming grid for weekdays which include the relaunch of Mornings @ ANC, the sports news program The Daily Serve hosted by Gretchen Ho and business program The Boss hosted by Cathy Yap-Yang.

On March 15, 2016, as part of ANC's 20th anniversary, the channel launched its own HD feed. On May 9, 2016, ANC began a 48-hour extensive coverage of the 2016 Philippine election leading to the poll results.

On May 25, 2016, British billionaire and philanthropist Sir Richard Branson of Virgin Group headlined the first Asian Innovation and Entrepreneurship Forum, an ANC Leadership Series, the main event of the station's 20th anniversary.

The production of the ANC's Sunday news programs was halted on March 22, 2020, due to the implementation of enhanced community quarantine to help control the spread of the COVID-19 pandemic in the Philippines. Furthermore, with the network shutting down operations due to the expiration of its legislative franchise and in compliance with the NTC's cease and desist order, the current status of the newscast remained unknown until it was eventually cancelled & franchise denial last July 10, 2020, citing numerous violations. It was then replaced by provisional programming on the same date. After the timesharing arrangement between DZMM TeleRadyo and ANC ended on April 26, 2020, ANC's Sunday newscasts were discontinued. This was followed by the cancellation of Saturday broadcasts on November 30, 2024.

On April 1, 2020, DZMM Radyo Patrol 630 and DZMM TeleRadyo has switched to simultaneous telecast with ANC starting at 10:00 p.m.; which evolved from its timesharing with the DZMM since March 19. With this move, DZMM and DZMM TeleRadyo, as well as the provincial regional AM radio station, become English-only (for the first time in history after many years) as a provisional measure. This programming scheme ended on April 20. However, it was retained until May 15 from 11:00 p.m. until 5:00 a.m. Prior to the discontinuation of TeleRadyo on June 30, 2023, it was resumed in 2021 from 10:00 p.m. until 5:30 a.m. of the following day.

From October 31, 2020, the channel has switched to simultaneous telecast with TeleRadyo due to the coverage of Typhoon Rolly and Typhoon Ulysses. It was relived on November 9, 2025 during Typhoon Uwan.

=== ANC Prestige on YouTube ===
On February 13, ANC launched ANC Prestige, a monthly subscription plan on the ANC 24/7 YouTube channel allowing domestic viewers to access the channel's programming seen on pay television, as well as additional benefits for active subscribers. The launch came as a supposed alternative option for cable subscribers, as ABS-CBN announced previously on January 29 that ANC would have continued its operations in anticipation of Sky Cable's scheduled closure by February 26, 2024. The planned buyout of Sky Cable to PLDT would eventually be terminated on February 22, with the former continuing its pay television operations; although ANC Prestige would continue regardless of the transaction's cancellation.

== Programming ==
The programming of ANC is focused primarily on news, business, and politics with weather updates, sports news, informative, religious and lifestyle programs as secondary contents. The network also shows documentaries and television specials, as well as select programs from ABS-CBN, ABS-CBN Regional Channel, Kapamilya Channel, Metro Channel, DZMM TeleRadyo and The Filipino Channel.

In case of developing stories, sudden breaking news or even important or scheduled live coverage, ANC pre-empts its regularly scheduled programming to give way for the developing news stories and/or blow-by-blow coverage as it happens. Regular scheduled programs resume once the coverage of an important event has ended.

== Notable hosts and news anchors ==
=== Current ===
- Alvin Elchico
- Bernadette Sembrano
- Gretchen Fullido
- Jeff Canoy
- Karmina Constantino
- Karen Davila
- Matteo Guidicelli
- Migs Bustos
- Noli de Castro
- Rico Hizon
- Winnie Cordero
- Tony Velasquez
- Stanley Palisada

=== Former ===
- Adel Tamano
- Alex Santos
- Angelo Castro Jr.
- Ariel Ureta
- Atom Araullo
- Aljo Bendijo
- Boy Abunda
- Boyet Sison
- Cathy Yang
- Ces Drilon
- Cheche Lazaro
- Cherie Mercado
- Cheryl Cosim
- Christine Bersola-Babao
- Claire Celdran
- Connie Sison
- Daniel Razon
- Daphne Oseña-Paez
- Dong Puno
- Dyan Castillejo
- Ed Lingao
- Erwin Tulfo
- Frankie Evangelista
- Gang Badoy
- Ginger Conejero
- Gretchen Ho
- Harry Gasser
- Henry Omaga-Diaz
- Julius Babao
- Katrina Legarda
- Kim Atienza
- Korina Sanchez-Roxas
- Loren Legarda
- Mai Rodriguez
- Manolo Quezon
- Maria Ressa
- Marc Logan
- Martin Nievera
- Mon Ilagan
- Niña Corpuz
- Phoemela Baranda
- Paolo Abrera
- Pia Guanio
- Pia Hontiveros
- Pinky Webb
- Ricky Carandang
- Susan Calo Medina
- Ted Failon
- Teodoro Locsin Jr.
- Tessa Prieto-Valdes
- TJ Manotoc
