= DYBR-AM =

DYBR
- Tacloban; Philippines
- Broadcast area: Northern Leyte, southern Samar
- Frequency: 711 kHz

Ownership
- Owner: Philippine Collective Media Corporation
- Sister stations: FM Radio 100.7

History
- First air date: April 25, 2011
- Last air date: November 8, 2013
- Former call signs: DYHT (1989–2002)
- Former names: Apple Radio (April 2011-November 2013)
- Former frequencies: 730 kHz (1965-1972)

Technical information
- Licensing authority: NTC

DYBR (711 AM) was a radio station owned and operated by the Philippine Collective Media Corporation. It was formerly known as Apple Radio from April 25, 2011 to November 8, 2013, when its transmitter was destroyed by Typhoon Yolanda.

Prior to PCMC's ownership, the frequency was formerly owned by Benjamin Romuladez from 1965 to 1972 when martial law commenced and then the Radio Mindanao Network from 1989 to 2002.
