= DYPC =

Radio station in the Philippines

FMR Calbayog (DYPC)
Relay of DYDR Tacloban
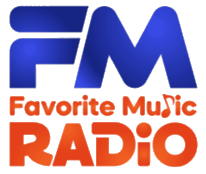
- Calbayog; Philippines
- Broadcast area: Northwestern Samar
- Frequency: 88.5 MHz
- Branding: 100.7 FMR

Programming
- Languages: Waray, Filipino
- Format: Contemporary MOR, News, Talk
- Network: FMR Philippines
- Affiliations: DZMM Radyo Patrol 630/DZMM TeleRadyo; ABS-CBN News (for TV Patrol newscast); PRTV Prime Media (for Arangkada Balita newscast)

Ownership
- Owner: Philippine Collective Media Corporation

History
- Call sign meaning: Philippine Collective Media Corporation

Technical information
- Licensing authority: NTC
- Class: B
- Power: 5,000 watts
- ERP: 10,500 watts

DYPC (88.5 FM) is a radio station owned and operated by the Philippine Collective Media Corporation. It is a relay of 100.7 FMR in Tacloban. The station's transmitter is located in Calbayog.

The callsign was previously used by an unlicensed station owned by Mandaue Broadcasting Center in Mandaue from 2013 to 2019. It currently broadcasts online.
