= Philippine Collective Media Corporation =

Philippine broadcast media company

- Type: Private
- Industry: Broadcasting, digital media
- Founded: May 21, 2008
- Founder: Martin Romualdez
- Headquarters: 5/F The Ignacia Place, 155 Mother Ignacia corner, Sgt. Esguerra Ave, Brgy. South Triangle, Diliman, Quezon City, Metro Manila, Philippines; 6F Universal RE Building, 120 Perea St. Paseo De Roxas St, Makati, Metro Manila, Philippines
- Owner: Prime Media Holdings, Inc. (indirect ownership)
- Parent: Golden Peregrine Holdings, Inc.
- Website: pcmc.com.ph

PRTV
- Type: Free-to-air regional TV channel
- Broadcast area: Eastern Visayas
- Headquarters: Tacloban

Programming
- Languages: Waray, Filipino

Ownership
- Sister channels: PRTV Prime Media; DZMM TeleRadyo

History
- Launched: April 25, 2011

Availability

Terrestrial
- Digital: Channel 50 (Tacloban)

FMR Philippines (Favorite Music Radio)
- Type: FM radio network
- Broadcast area: Philippines

Programming
- Languages: Filipino, Various Philippine languages
- Format: Contemporary MOR, News, Talk

History
- Launch date: February 17, 2020

Coverage
- Availability: Nationwide (radio; also available on Cignal)

Links
- Webcast: mytuner-radio.com/radio/fm-radio-philippines-507113/

Philippine Collective Media Corporation (PCMC; officially known in their documents as Philippine CollectiveMedia Corporation) is a Philippine broadcast media company. Its headquarters are located in Barangay South Triangle, Quezon City, with offices in Makati and Tacloban. It owns a number of radio stations across the country under the FMR Philippines (Favorite Music Radio) network. It also owns television stations PRTV Prime Media and PRTV, and operates DZMM Radyo Patrol 630 under a joint venture with ABS-CBN.

== History ==
PCMC was founded on May 21, 2008. It was granted a broadcasting franchise under Republic Act 9773 in 2009, with its coverage initially limited in the Eastern Visayas region. On April 25, 2011, PCMC launched three stations in Tacloban: AM station DYBR (discontinued in 2013 following the aftermath of Typhoon Yolanda), FM station DYDR, and its first local independent TV station PRTV.

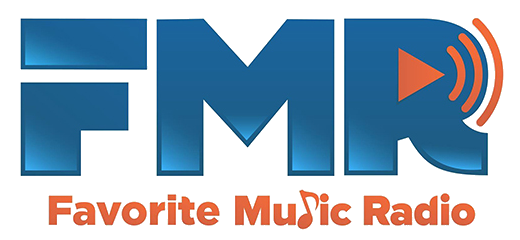
FMR logo from 2020 to 2023.

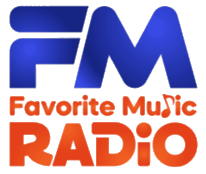
FM Radio logo from 2024 to 2026.

The company's legislative franchise was later amended in 2020 under Republic Act 11508, allowing PCMC to operate national broadcast without President Rodrigo Duterte's signature, as the bill lapsed into law after 30 days of inaction. PCMC then launched the Favorite Music Radio network (FMR, based on the owner's initials), with DYDR rebranded under the said brand. As part of the expansion, PCMC planned to set up 35 radio stations nationwide by 2021.

In May 2021, PCMC and Prime Media Holdings, Inc. (PMHI/PRIM), a publicly traded investment firm involving real estate and hospitality, signed a share-for-share swap agreement through a backdoor listing. Under the deal, PCMC shareholders will exchange their shares of common stock to take majority control of PRIM, which will acquire PCMC and become the latter's subsidiary.

With the expansion of its radio and television operations, the company is expected to launch a national TV network with its plans to collaborate with several content providers (among them is ABS-CBN Corporation).

On September 20, 2021, PCMC and ZOE Broadcasting Network signed an affiliation deal to air A2Z's programming on PRTV Tacloban as a digital subchannel.

In 2022, Prime Media's memorandum was later revised following the creation of holding firm Golden Peregrine Holdings (GPHI); GPHI would directly acquire PCMC as its subsidiary, while keeping Prime Media as its indirect parent entity.

On May 6, 2024, ABS-CBN's flagship newscast TV Patrol begin airing on all Favorite Music Radio stations, a year after PCMC acquired 630 AM in Manila that resulted in the relaunch as DWPM Radyo 630, a conjointly-operated station with ABS-CBN under Media Serbisyo Production Corporation. (630 AM, while retaining the DWPM callsign, would later rebrand as a revival of DZMM Radyo Patrol 630 in mid-2025, still under both PCMC ownership and MSPC programming management.)

On May 27, 2024, PCMC and Prime Media formally launched its own national TV channel Prime TV, which serves as an expansion of the PRTV brand.

In October 2024, PCMC/Prime Media signed an agreement with MediaQuest Holdings to acquire the radio assets of Nation Broadcasting Corporation (NBC), which houses Radyo5 True FM, operated by NBC's sister company TV5 Network. As part of its sale/transfer agreement (subject to regulatory approvals), PCMC will lease NBC radio stations in Manila, Baguio, Bacolod, Davao and General Santos. This prompted True FM to move to Bright Star's 105.9 FM in Mega Manila and IBMI's 106.7 FM in Davao.

== PCMC stations ==
=== Television ===
==== PRTV ====
Digital

Branding	Callsign	Ch. #	Frequency	Power	Area of Coverage
PRTV	DYPR-DTV	50	689.143 MHz	2 kW	Tacloban

UHF Channel 50 (689.143 MHz)

Channel	Video	Aspect	Short name	Programming	Note
27.01	480i	4:3	PRTV	PRTV Tacloban (Main DYPR-TV programming)	Test broadcast/Configuration testing
27.02	480i	4:3	TV5	TV5	Test broadcast/Configuration testing
27.03	480i	4:3	A2Z	A2Z (ZOE TV)	Test broadcast/Configuration testing
27.04	480i	4:3	Reserve	Test Feed	Test broadcast/Configuration testing

Digital affiliate stations

Branding	Callsign	Ch. #	Frequency	Power	Area of Coverage
PSUB	—N/a	50	689.143 MHz	1 kW	Nabua

==== PRTV Prime Media ====
Short Name	Programming	Ch. # (LCN)	Frequency	Owner
PRTV PRIME	PRTV Prime Media	xx.1	Various (See list)	Broadcast Enterprises and Affiliated Media

=== Radio ===
==== AM stations ====
Branding	Callsign	Frequency	Location	Notes
DZMM Radyo Patrol	DWPM	630 KHz	Metro Manila	Operated conjointly with ABS-CBN Corporation under Media Serbisyo Production Corporation. Formerly known as Radyo 630.

==== FM stations ====
Branding	Callsign	Frequency	Location
FMR Manila	DWFM (Note: Frequency owned by Nation Broadcasting Corporation (outright acquisition of the frequency pending).)	92.3 MHz	Metro Manila
FMR Manila	DZYB	102.3 MHz	Baguio
FMR Manila	DYBC	102.3 MHz	Bacolod City
FMR Manila	DXOO	97.5 MHz	General Santos
FMR Tacloban	DYDR	100.7 MHz	Tacloban
FMR Tacloban	DYPA	101.7 MHz	Borongan
FMR Tacloban	DYPC	88.5 MHz	Calbayog
FMR Tacloban	DYPF	106.9 MHz	Catbalogan
FMR Tacloban	—N/a	91.7 MHz	Catarman
FMR Cagayan	DWEX	94.9 MHz	Peñablanca
FMR Nueva Vizcaya	—N/a	93.3 MHz	Bambang
FMR Camarines Sur	DZRP	94.5 MHz	Goa
DWBT (Note: Operated jointly with the Polytechnic State University of Bicol.)	DWBT	94.3 MHz	Nabua
FMR Bacolod	—N/a	91.1 MHz	Bacolod
XFM Bacolod (Note: Operated by Y2H Broadcasting Network Inc.)	—N/a	103.9 MHz	Bacolod
FMR Cebu (Note: Frequency owned by Vimcontu Broadcasting Corporation.)	DYWF	93.1 MHz	Cebu
FMR Maasin	DYAE	96.5 MHz	Maasin
FMR Camiguin	—N/a	98.3 MHz	Mambajao
FMR Babe Radio	—N/a	106.1 MHz	Dipolog
FMR Zamboanga Sibugay	DXCU	99.3 MHz	Ipil
FMR Davao de Oro	DXPG	96.7 MHz	Nabunturan
FMR Davao/DavNor	DXFM	101.9 MHz	Davao
FMR Davao/DavNor	—N/a	89.5 MHz	Tagum
FMR Sky Radio	DXJF	96.1 MHz	Hagonoy
FMR Butuan	DXBO	101.5 MHz	Butuan
FMR Bagtik Radio	DXDU	89.3 MHz	Surigao
FMR Iligan	—N/a	96.7 MHz	Iligan

Affiliates

Branding	Callsign	Frequency	Location	Owner
Happy Radio	DZJD	102.5 MHz	Tumauini	90 Degrees North, Inc.
Radyo Asenso	—N/a	95.7 MHz	Monkayo	Municipal Government of Monkayo
Radio Ignacia	—N/a	87.9 MHz	Cotabato	Notre Dame – RVM College of Cotabato

=== Inactive stations ===
Callsign	Frequency	Location	Note/s
DYBR	711 KHz	Tacloban	Transmitter destroyed by Typhoon Haiyan in 2013.
—N/a	90.1 MHz	Iloilo City	Went off the air in October 2025.
—N/a	94.3 MHz	Baguio	Ceased transmission on December 1, 2023. Resumed online on January 24, 2024. Discontinued by the management in May 2025.
—N/a	97.5 MHz	Virac	Transmitter destroyed by Severe Tropical Storm Paeng in October 2022. Online broadcasts discontinued in January 2023.
—N/a	94.3 MHz	Sariaya	Went off the air in July 2025.
—N/a	105.1 MHz	Malaybalay	Went off the air in December 2025.
