= DYSI-FM =

Radyo Natin Calbayog (DYSI)
- Calbayog; Philippines
- Broadcast area: parts of Samar
- Frequency: 104.9 MHz
- Branding: Radyo Natin 104.9

Programming
- Languages: Waray, Filipino
- Format: Community radio
- Network: Radyo Natin Network

Ownership
- Owner: MBC Media Group

History
- First air date: December 16, 1997
- Call sign meaning: Samar Island

Technical information
- Licensing authority: NTC
- Power: 1 kW
- ERP: 5 kW

Links
- Webcast: radyonatinfm.com/calbayog/

DYSI (104.9 FM), broadcasting as Radyo Natin 104.9, is a radio station owned and operated by MBC Media Group. The station's studio & transmitter are located at Purok 5, Barangay Matobato, Calbayog City, Samar.
