= Prime Media Holdings =

Company in the Philippines

Prime Media Holdings, Inc.
- Formerly: Private Development Corporation of the Philippines (1963); PDCP Development Bank, Inc. (1963–2000); First e-Bank Corporation (2000–2003)
- Company type: Public
- Traded as: PSE: PRIM
- Industry: Holding company (Investment)
- Founded: February 6, 1963; 63 years ago
- Headquarters: 16/F BDO Towers Valero, 8741 Paseo de Roxas, Legaspi Village, Makati, Metro Manila, Philippines
- Area served: Worldwide
- Key people: Manolito A. Manalo (President and Chairman)
- Products: Radio stations Web portals Television channels
- Services: Broadcasting; Digital media
- Owner: RYM Business Management Corporation (54.52%); Mairete Asset Holdings Inc. (9.08%); Angel Maple Properties Inc. (14.7%); Cymac Holdings Corporation (2.94%); Public stock (18.76%)
- Subsidiaries: Philippine Collective Media Corporation (indirect ownership); Media Serbisyo Production Corporation (51%; co-owned with ABS-CBN Corporation)
- Website: primemedia.com.ph

Prime Media Holdings, Inc. (PMHI, commonly known as Prime Media) is a Philippine investment holding company based in Makati. Originally founded on February 6, 1963 as a development bank, the company has been changed to its current status since 2003. It is majority controlled by RYM Business Management Corporation, a business holding company associated with the Romualdez clan.

== History ==
=== Early years ===
The company traced was founded on February 6, 1963 as the Private Development Corporation of the Philippines (PDCP). It was a development financial institution incorporated in 1963 with the assistance of the World Bank, USAID, and the Philippine government.

For over 30 years, it operated as an investment house and established itself in private sector term lending, private finance, corporate finance, training and consulting, and fund management. Metro Pacific Corporation (later renamed Neo Oracle) acquired the company in 1992 and renamed it as PDCP Development Bank, Inc., then as First e-Bank Corporation (1st e-Bank) eight years later in 2000. The then Cojuangco-led Bank of Commerce bought a stake in 2002. However, in October of the same year, BDO Unibank acquired the operations of 1st e-Bank including its Smart Money Mastercard debit card issuer (which is a partnership with Smart Communications until 2017).

On October 20, 2003, First e-Bank Corporation was renamed as Prime Media Holdings, Inc. after selling its namesake business assets & operations to BDO Unibank, leaving the company to became dormant holding investment.

=== Under new ownership ===
In 2013, RYM Business Management Corporation, acquired the majority stake in Prime Media from Neo Oracle.

In May 2021, Prime Media Holdings signed a share-for-share swap agreement with Philippine Collective Media Corporation (PCMC, through a backdoor listing. Under the deal, PCMC shareholders will exchange their shares of common stock to take majority control of PRIM, which will acquire PCMC and will become the latter's subsidiary. However, the memorandum was later revised following PCMC's shareholders created a holding firm Golden Peregrine Holdings (GPHI) which was already acquired PCMC, therefore GPHI became a direct subsidiary of PMHI with PCMC as its indirect subsidiary.

On May 23, 2023, Prime Media announced a joint venture agreement with ABS-CBN Corporation. The new venture company will produce and supply various programs including news content to broadcasters and third-party entities, including PCMC. Along with it are plans to operate a radio station on ABS-CBN's former frequency 630 kHz (previously known as DZMM), and managing the Filipino-language cable news channel TeleRadyo (which was originally intended to cease its broadcast on June 30, but was abruptly cancelled and reduced to closing out most of its old concurrent programs instead). On June 26, 2023, 630 kHz conducted a test broadcast under the DWPM callsign. The station and its TV counterpart had its soft launch on June 30 as Radyo 630 and TeleRadyo Serbisyo respectively and officially launched on July 17. It then reverted back into the iconic DZMM callsign on May 29, 2025, which rebranded back as DZMM Radyo Patrol 630; its TV counterpart, TeleRadyo Serbisyo, also rebranded back as DZMM TeleRadyo on the same day.
