= Nueva Vizcaya Agricultural Terminal =

Agricultural facility in the Philippines

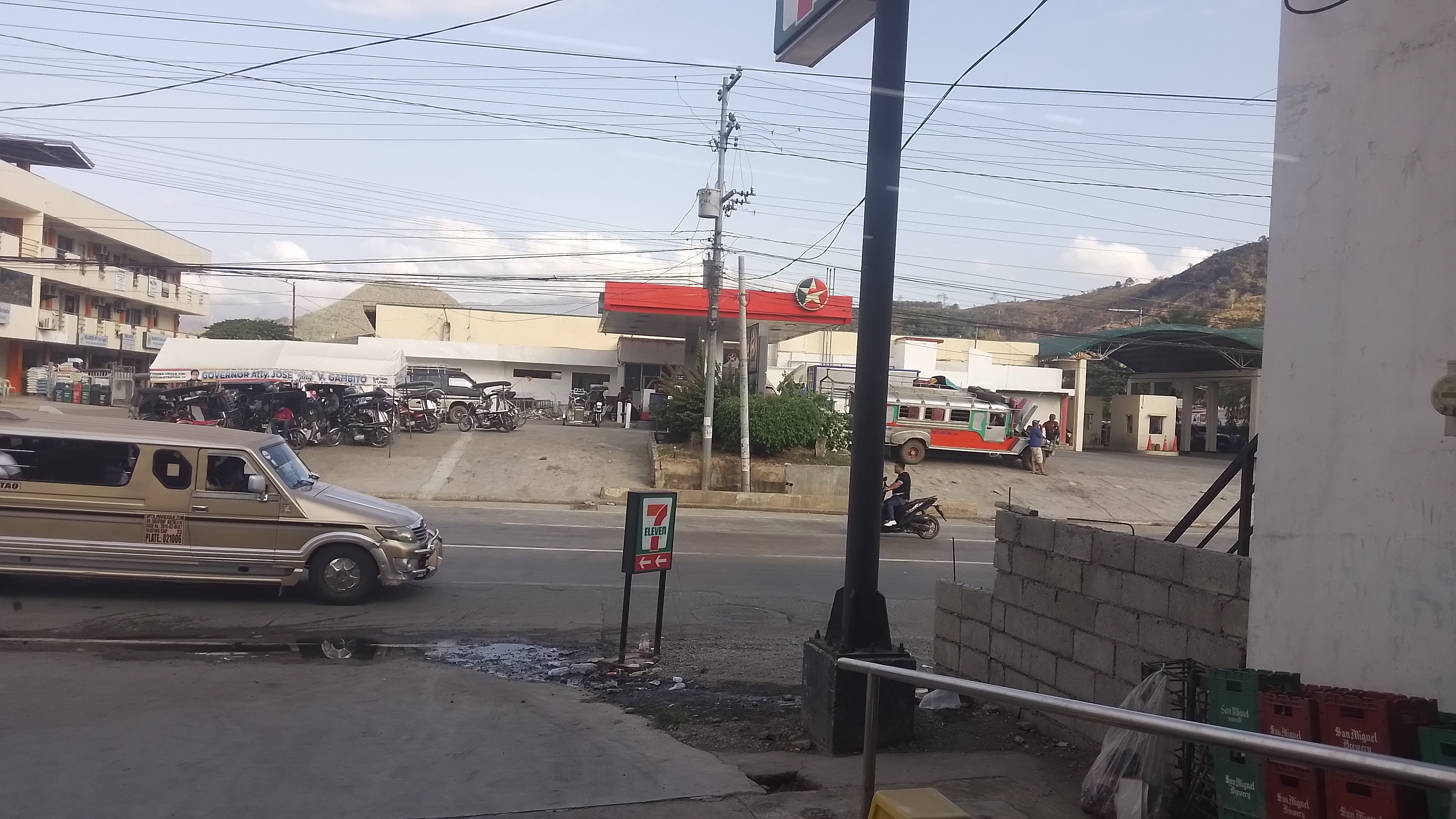
- Entrance of the Nueva Vizcaya Agricultural Terminal in 2024
- Interactive map of the Nueva Vizcaya Agricultural Terminal area

General information
- Location: Barangay Almaguer North, Bambang, Nueva Vizcaya, Philippines
- Coordinates: 16°21′58″N 121°5′51″E
- Year built: 1998–2005
- Owner: Nueva Vizcaya Agricultural Terminal Inc.
- Company
- Industry: Agriculture
- Founded: 2001; 25 years ago in Bambang, Nueva Vizcaya, Philippines
- Area served: Nueva Vizcaya
- Products: Agricultural products

Nueva Vizcaya Agricultural Terminal (NVAT) is an agricultural facility located in Bambang, Nueva Vizcaya, Philippines. It is owned by the Nueva Vizcaya Agricultural Terminal Inc., a Filipino agricultural public-private joint venture company. It is the largest agricultural trading post in the Cagayan Valley region. The main problem in the Nueva Vizcaya Agricultural Terminal is the oversupply of crops, which results in farmers being unable to sell all their produce and sometimes having to throw them away. This oversupply causes losses to farmers despite the quality of their crops, as consumers tend to prefer larger-sized produce and some crops do not meet cosmetic standards for sale.According to the Global FoodBanking Network, in 2024, 500 metric tonnes or 500,000 kilograms (1,100,000 lb) of fruits and vegetables were brought to the facility every day, although half of them are thrown out.

Before 2004, the province of Nueva Vizcaya did not have a proper agricultural trading system. The government of the province addressed the problem by establishing Nueva Vizcaya Agricultural Terminal (NVAT), a vegetable trading facility in 1998 in collaboration with CASCADE, a European Union-funded project, the Department of Agriculture, and farmers' organization, who manage the daily operation of the facility. They established a 6.7 hectares (17 acres) centralized marketing center in Barangay Almaguer North in Bambang, Nueva Vizcaya. In 2001, it was established and registered in the Securities and Exchange Commission. In 2004, NVAT built stalls for farmers and traders in the facility to encourage farmers to use the facilities. In 2005, it became operational. From 2013 to 2016, the provincial government pursued the privatization of the company, selling the company's stocks to farmers and organizations, shifting the company's private ownership from 30% to 70% by 2016, and by 2023, the private ownership is 85.29%. In February 2023, the facility built a fruit and vegetable juice processing facility. In August, it rolled out the "NVAT Fresh Online Platform", an online business-to-business platform in collaboration with the United States Agency for International Development.
