= DWJY =

Sariaya; Philippines
- Broadcast area: Quezon and surrounding areas
- Frequency: 94.3 MHz

Programming
- Format: Silent

Ownership
- Owner: Philippine Collective Media Corporation

History
- First air date: 1982
- Last air date: 2025
- Former names: MRS (1982–1998); Lovely (1998–2008); FM Radio (2023-2025)

Technical information
- Licensing authority: NTC

DWJY (94.3 FM) was a radio station owned and operated by the Philippine Collective Media Corporation.

== History ==
Logo in 2023

The station was formerly under the ownership of Nation Broadcasting Corporation and was licensed to San Pablo, Laguna. It first went on air in 1982 as MRS 94.3, airing an adult contemporary format. In 1998, after NBC was acquired by PLDT subsidiary MediaQuest Holdings, the station rebranded as Lovely @ Rhythms 94.3 and switched to a Top 40 format. In 2005, the "Rhythms" tag was dropped. In 2008, it became a relay station of Manila-based 92.3 FM until June 2012, when it went off the air due to frequency conflicts.

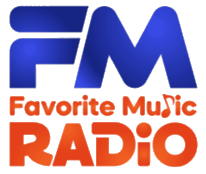
Logo from 2024 to 2025

In late 2022, the Philippine Collective Media Corporation acquired the frequency. It went on the air in May 2023 under the FM Radio Network, broadcasting from Sariaya.

On May 6, 2024, ABS-CBN's flagship newscast TV Patrol begin airing on this station along with other selected Favorite Music Radio stations nationwide.

In July 2025, FM Radio went off the air for unknown reasons.
