= DXOO =

Radio station in General Santos, Philippines

Relay of DWFM Manila
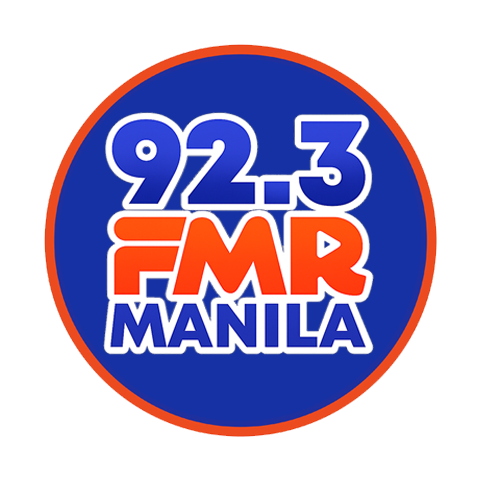
- General Santos; Philippines
- Broadcast area: South Cotabato, Sarangani
- Frequency: 97.5 MHz
- Branding: 92.3 FMR

Programming
- Language: Filipino
- Format: Contemporary MOR, OPM
- Network: FMR Philippines

Ownership
- Owner: Nation Broadcasting Corporation
- Operator: Philippine Collective Media Corporation (outright acquisition of the frequency pending)

History
- First air date: 1976
- Former names: MRS (1976–1998); Anna (1998–2009); WAV FM (2009–2011); Radyo5 (2011–2024)

Technical information
- Licensing authority: NTC
- Power: 5,000 watts
- ERP: 10,000 watts

DXOO (97.5 FM) is a radio station owned by Nation Broadcasting Corporation and operated by Philippine Collective Media Corporation. It currently serves as a relay station of 92.3 FMR in Manila. The station's transmitter is located in PLDT Building, Beatiles St., General Santos.

== History ==
The station began operations in 1976 as MRS 97.5, airing an adult contemporary format. In 1998, after NBC was acquired by PLDT subsidiary MediaQuest Holdings, the station rebranded as Anna @ Rhythms 97.5 (later on shortened to Anna 97.5 in 2005) and switched to a Top 40 format. In 2009, it rebranded as WAV FM. On February 21, 2011, months after TV5 took over the station's operations, it became a relay station of Radyo5 92.3 based in Metro Manila. On November 4, 2024, it became part of the Favorite Music Radio (FMR) network, albeit continuing as a relay. As part of an agreement between Nation Broadcasting Corporation (NBC) and Philippine Collective Media Corporation (PCMC), it is among NBC's radio assets and frequencies acquired by PCMC.
