= DZYB =

Radio station in Baguio, Philippines

Relay of DWFM Manila
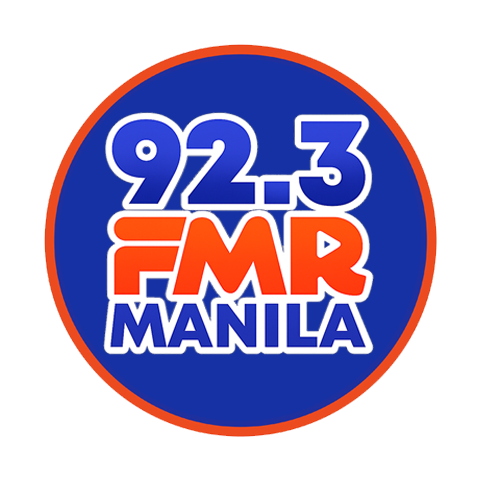
- Baguio; Philippines
- Broadcast area: Benguet, La Union and surrounding areas
- Frequency: 102.3 MHz
- Branding: 92.3 FMR

Programming
- Language: Filipino
- Format: Contemporary MOR, OPM
- Network: FMR Philippines

Ownership
- Owner: Nation Broadcasting Corporation
- Operator: Philippine Collective Media Corporation (outright acquisition of the frequency pending)
- Sister stations: Through PCMC: PRTV Prime Media (DWHB-DTV)

History
- First air date: 1978
- Former names: MRS (1976-1998); Jesse (1998-2011); Radyo5 (2011-2024)
- Call sign meaning: Yabut (former owner)

Technical information
- Licensing authority: NTC
- Power: 10,000 watts
- ERP: 20,000 watts

DZYB (102.3 FM) is a radio station owned by Nation Broadcasting Corporation and operated by Philippine Collective Media Corporation. It currently serves as a relay station of 92.3 FMR in Manila. The station's transmitter is located at Mt. Sto. Tomas, Tuba, Benguet.

== History ==
The station began operations in 1978 as MRS 102.3, airing an adult contemporary format. In 1998, after NBC was acquired by PLDT subsidiary MediaQuest Holdings, the station rebranded as Jesse @ Rhythms 102.3 and switched to a Top 40 format. In 2005, the name was shortened to 102.3 Jesse as the station switched to an urban contemporary format.

On February 21, 2011, months after TV5 took over operations of the station's operations, it became a relay station of Radyo5 92.3 based in Metro Manila. On November 4, 2024, it became part of the Favorite Music Radio (FMR) network, albeit continuing as a relay. As part of an agreement between Nation Broadcasting Corporation (NBC) and Philippine Collective Media Corporation (PCMC), it is among NBC's radio assets and frequencies acquired by PCMC.
