= DWBT =

- Nabua; Philippines
- Broadcast area: Camarines Sur and surrounding areas
- Frequency: 94.3 MHz
- Branding: DWBT 94.3

Programming
- Languages: Bicolano, Filipino, English
- Format: College Radio
- Network: FMR Philippines

Ownership
- Owner: Philippine Collective Media Corporation
- Operator: Camarines Sur Polytechnic Colleges
- Sister stations: DZCC 87.5

History
- First air date: March 22, 2021
- Former names: FMR University FM

Technical information
- Licensing authority: NTC
- Power: 5,000 watts

DWBT (94.3 FM) is a radio station owned by the Philippine Collective Media Corporation and operated by the Camarines Sur Polytechnic Colleges. The station's studio and transmitter is located at the CSPC Broadcast Center, Brgy. San Miguel, Nabua.
