= DYPR-DTV =

- Tacloban, Leyte; Philippines
- Channels: Digital: 50 (UHF) (ISDB-T) (test broadcast); Virtual: 27
- Branding: PRTV Tacloban

Programming
- Languages: Waray, Filipino
- Subchannels: See list
- Affiliations: 27.01: PRTV Tacloban; 27.02: TV5; 27.03: A2Z (ZOE TV)

Ownership
- Owner: Philippine Collective Media Corporation
- Sister stations: 100.7 FMR Tacloban; PRTV Prime Media; DZMM TeleRadyo; A2Z Tacloban

History
- Founded: April 25, 2011; 15 years ago
- Former channel numbers: Analog: 12 (VHF, now an A2Z relay)

Technical information
- Power: 2 kW
- ERP: 5 kW

DYPR-DTV (channel 50) is a commercial television station owned and operated by the Philippine Collective Media Corporation. The station's studios are located at the 3rd floor, Tingog Community Center, Real St. cor. Calanipawan Rd., Brgy. Sagkahan, and the transmitter is located at the Remedios Trinidad Romualdez Hospital Compound, Brgy. 96 (Calanipawan), Tacloban, Leyte.

In the 1990s, Channel 12 was a regional affiliate station of the Intercontinental Broadcasting Corporation.

It also broadcast on digital TV via Channel 50 on GMA Affordabox, ABS-CBN TV Plus, Sulit TV and PRTV Tipidbox.

== PRTV programs ==
Note: Some programs are simulcast with sister FM station FMR Tacloban every Monday to Sunday.

- Arangkada (flagship/rolling newscast)
  - Arangkada Sais Trenta
  - Arangkada Dose Trenta
  - Arangkada Balita (formerly known as Arangkada Singko Trenta)
- Isyu at Komentaryo
- Wanted Pangga

=== Newscast ===
- TV Patrol (2024, simulcast with A2Z, All TV, ANC, DZMM Radyo Patrol 630, DZMM TeleRadyo, Kapamilya Channel, PRTV Prime Media and selected FMR Stations Nationwide)

== Digital television ==
=== Digital channels ===
UHF Channel 50 (689.143 MHz)

Channel	Video	Aspect	Short name	Programming	Note
27.01	1080i	16:9	PRTV TACLOBAN	PRTV Tacloban	Test broadcast / Configuration testing
27.02	480i	16:9	TV5	TV5	Test broadcast / Configuration testing
27.03	720p	16:9	A2Z	A2Z (ZOE TV)	Test broadcast / Configuration testing

== Areas of coverage ==
=== Primary areas ===
- Tacloban
- Portions of Leyte
- Portions of Samar
