= Bambang, Nueva Vizcaya =

Municipality in Nueva Vizcaya, Philippines

Bambang
- Municipality
- Municipality of Bambang
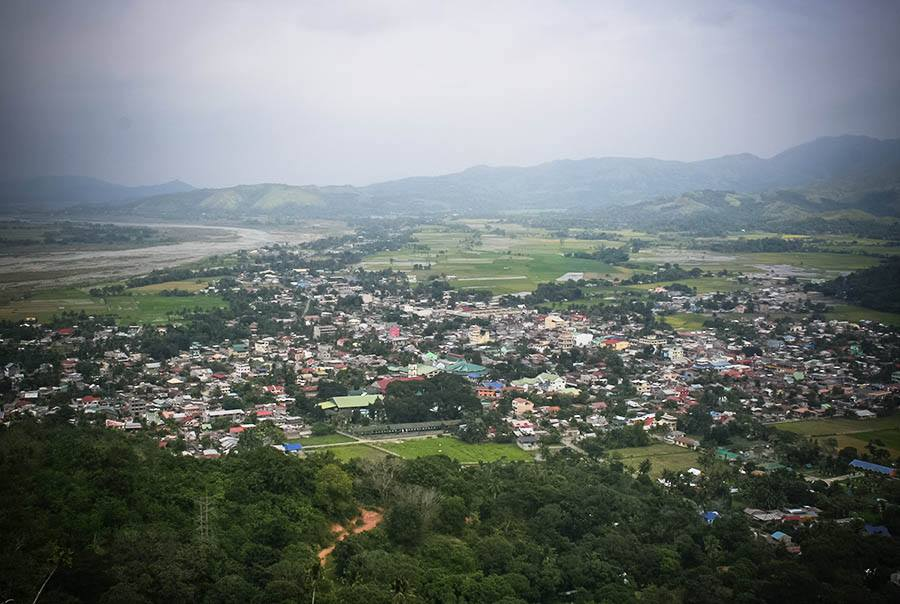
- Aerial view of Bambang

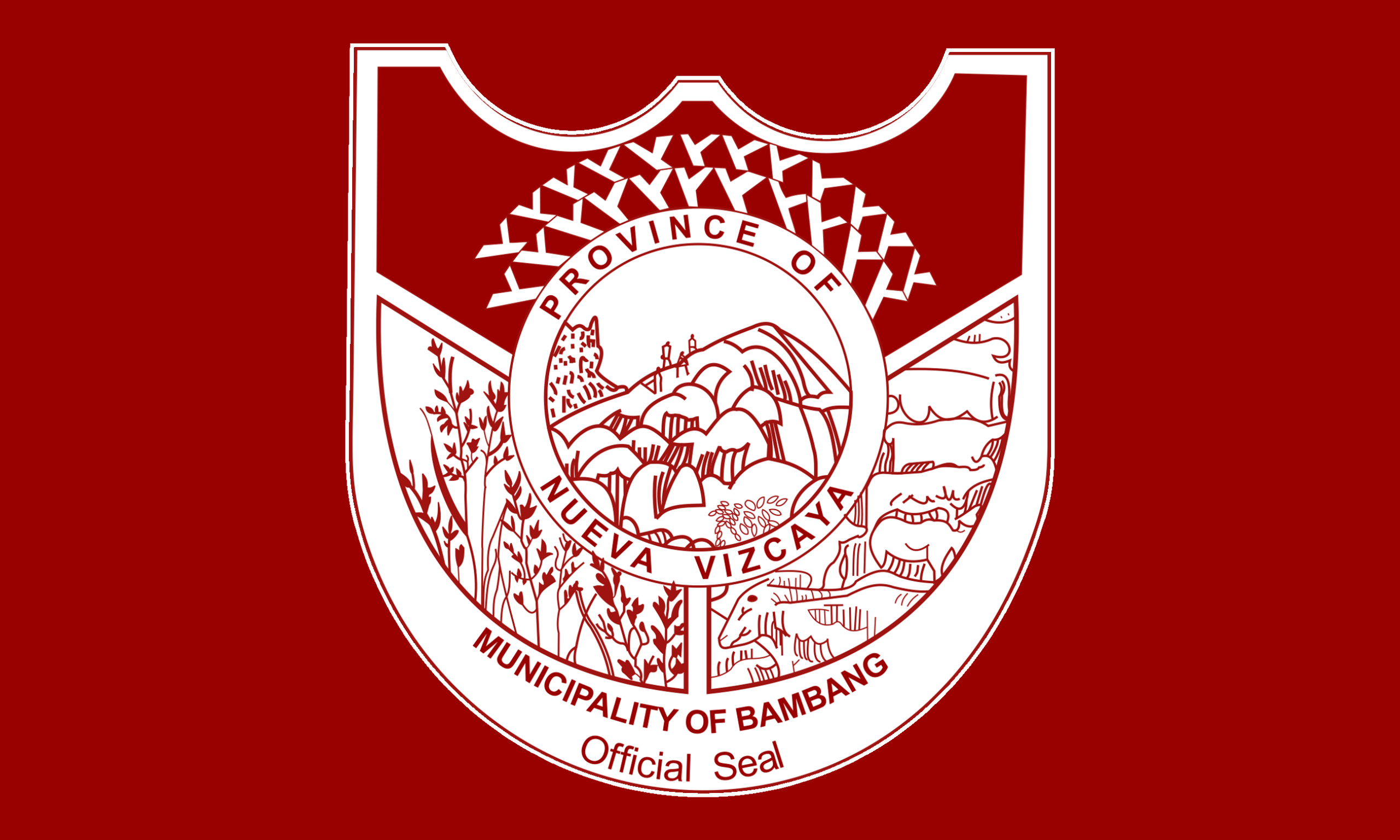
- Flag Seal

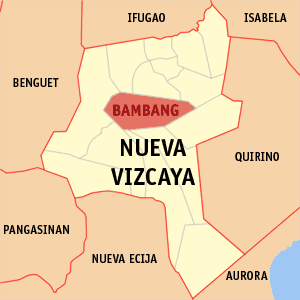
- Map of Nueva Vizcaya with Bambang highlighted
- Interactive map of Bambang
- Location within the Philippines
- Coordinates: 16°23′14″N 121°06′27″E
- Country: Philippines
- Region: Cagayan Valley
- Province: Nueva Vizcaya
- District: Lone district
- Barangays: 25 (see Barangays)

Government
  - Type: Sangguniang Bayan
  - Mayor: Benjamin Ll. Cuaresma III
  - Vice Mayor: Arnel Duldulao
  - Electorate: 34,457 voters (2025)

Area
  - Total: 345.00 km^{2} (133.21 sq mi)
- Elevation: 392 m (1,286 ft)
- Highest elevation: 771 m (2,530 ft)
- Lowest elevation: 305 m (1,001 ft)

Population (2024 census)
  - Total: 60,146
  - Density: 174.34/km^{2} (451.53/sq mi)
  - Households: 14,470

Economy
  - Income class: 1st municipal income class
  - Poverty incidence: 5.12% (2023)
  - Revenue: ₱ 350.5 million (2024)
  - Assets: ₱ 885 million (2024)
  - Expenditure: ₱ 287.8 million (2024)
  - Liabilities: ₱ 121 million (2024)

Service provider
  - Electricity: Nueva Vizcaya Electric Cooperative (NUVELCO)
- Time zone: UTC+8 (PST)
- ZIP code: 3702
- PSGC: 0205004000
- IDD : area code: +63 (0)78
- Native languages: Gaddang; Ilocano; Isinai; Tagalog

Bambang, officially the Municipality of Bambang (Gaddang: Ili na Bambang; Ilocano: Ili ti Bambang; Tagalog: Bayan ng Bambang), is a municipality in the province of Nueva Vizcaya, Philippines. According to the 2024 census, it has a population of 60,146 people.

== Etymology ==
The name "Bambang" is an Isinay word meaning "to dig". The municipality is known for its salt springs at the Salinas Natural Monument.

== History ==
Bambang was originally inhabited by the Igorot and Panuypuyes (Aritao), the Ilongots (Dupax and Bambang), and the lgorot in the area west from the present native population of Dupax, Aritao, and Bambang came about by the inter-marriages of the tribes mentioned above and the merging of settlements by the Spanish. Bambang itself was officially recognized as a town by the Spanish on July 5, 1747. Located initially in the present-day village of San Fernando, it was moved to its present location in 1777. According to the town's history, the warring Ilongots and Igorots buried their weapons nearby a pit ("bang-bang") to symbolize the end of their tribal feuds, and so birthed the name of the town Bambang.

In 1988, the town's mayor, Benjamin Cuaresma, was abducted and assassinated by the New People's Army on the eve of local elections. He was then succeed by his widow, Luisa Lloren Cuaresma, who went on to become governor and representative of Nueva Vizcaya.

== Geography ==
Bambang is situated 16.20 kilometres (10.07 mi) from the provincial capital Bayombong, and 277.48 kilometres (172.42 mi) from the country's capital city of Manila.

=== Barangays ===
Bambang is politically subdivided into 25 barangays. Each barangay consists of puroks and some have sitios.

- Abian
- Abinganan
- Aliaga
- Almaguer North
- Almaguer South
- Banggot (Urban)
- Barat
- Buag (Urban)
- Calaocan (Urban)
- Dullao
- Homestead (Urban)
- Indiana
- Mabuslo
- Macate
- Magsaysay Hill (Urban)
- Manamtam
- Mauan
- Pallas
- Salinas
- San Antonio North
- San Antonio South
- San Fernando
- San Leonardo
- Santo Domingo Proper (Tabangan)
- Santo Domingo West

=== Climate ===
Climate data for Bambang, Nueva Vizcaya
| Month | Jan | Feb | Mar | Apr | May | Jun | Jul | Aug | Sep | Oct | Nov | Dec | Year |
|---|---|---|---|---|---|---|---|---|---|---|---|---|---|
| Mean daily maximum °C (°F) | 25 (77) | 28 (82) | 30 (86) | 31 (88) | 30 (86) | 29 (84) | 28 (82) | 28 (82) | 28 (82) | 29 (84) | 28 (82) | 27 (81) | 28 (83) |
| Mean daily minimum °C (°F) | 18 (64) | 19 (66) | 20 (68) | 22 (72) | 23 (73) | 23 (73) | 23 (73) | 23 (73) | 23 (73) | 21 (70) | 20 (68) | 19 (66) | 21 (70) |
| Average precipitation mm (inches) | 21 (0.8) | 28 (1.1) | 34 (1.3) | 58 (2.3) | 160 (6.3) | 179 (7.0) | 226 (8.9) | 225 (8.9) | 215 (8.5) | 168 (6.6) | 59 (2.3) | 32 (1.3) | 1,405 (55.3) |
| Average rainy days | 7.5 | 8.5 | 10.9 | 14.9 | 23.9 | 25.7 | 26.7 | 25.3 | 24.9 | 18.6 | 11.8 | 8.9 | 207.6 |
Source: Meteoblue

== Demographics ==
Population census of Bambang

| Year | Pop. | ±% p.a. |
|---|---|---|
| 1903 | 2,033 | — |
| 1918 | 2,753 | +2.04% |
| 1939 | 8,545 | +5.54% |
| 1948 | 11,188 | +3.04% |
| 1960 | 15,592 | +2.80% |
| 1970 | 20,474 | +2.76% |
| 1975 | 23,073 | +2.43% |
| 1980 | 26,204 | +2.58% |

| Year | Pop. | ±% p.a. |
|---|---|---|
| 1990 | 33,663 | +2.54% |
| 1995 | 36,975 | +1.77% |
| 2000 | 41,393 | +2.45% |
| 2007 | 45,440 | +1.29% |
| 2010 | 47,657 | +1.75% |
| 2015 | 53,433 | +2.20% |
| 2020 | 55,789 | +0.91% |
| 2024 | 60,146 | +1.82% |

Source: Philippine Statistics Authority

== Economy ==
Poverty incidence of Bambang

Source: Philippine Statistics Authority

The Nueva Vizcaya Agricultural Terminal is located in Barangay Almaguer North. It is the largest agricultural trading post in the Cagayan Valley Region.

== Culture ==
Panggayjaya festival, which is celebrated from late April to May yearly. Part of its celebration is the annual Miss Panggayjaya (Bambang) and the counterpart Mister Bambang which started in 2016. Along with the celebration of its patron, Saint Catherine of Siena.

== Tourism ==
On April 23, 2000, then President Joseph Ejercito Estrada issued a proclamation that declared Salinas Forest Reserve and Deer Refuge in the Municipality of Bambang, including two municipalities in the Province of Nueva Vizcaya, as a protected area pursuant to Republic Act No. 7589 and shall be known as Salinas Natural Monument. As of now, Salinas Natural Monument has yet to be developed as a tourist destination.

The Municipality of Bambang has a lot of tourist spots like the Salinas Salt Spring, Manamtam Salt Spring, Manamtam River, Laguerta Falls, Abian Falls, Pallas Cave, the Bambang Cross, and the Bambang Agri Tourism Learning Site.

Recently, the Municipality of Bambang successfully launched "Paskuhan sa Bambang."

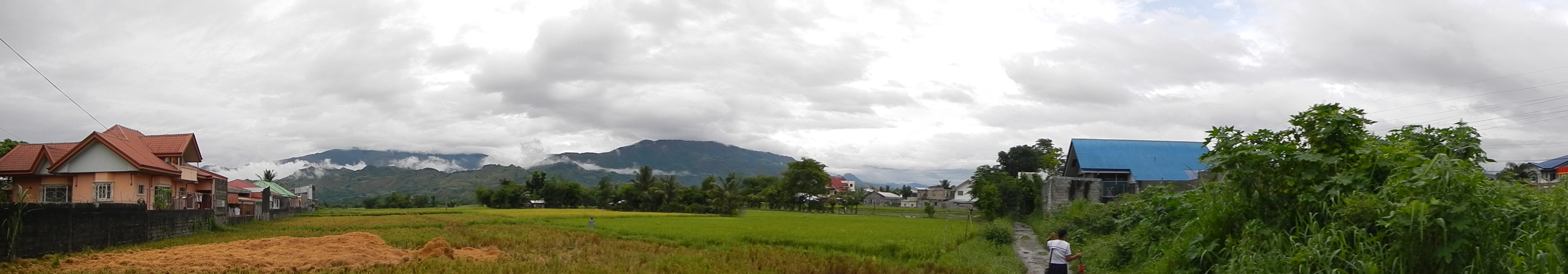
Fields, roads, mountain ranges panorama

== Government ==
=== Local government ===
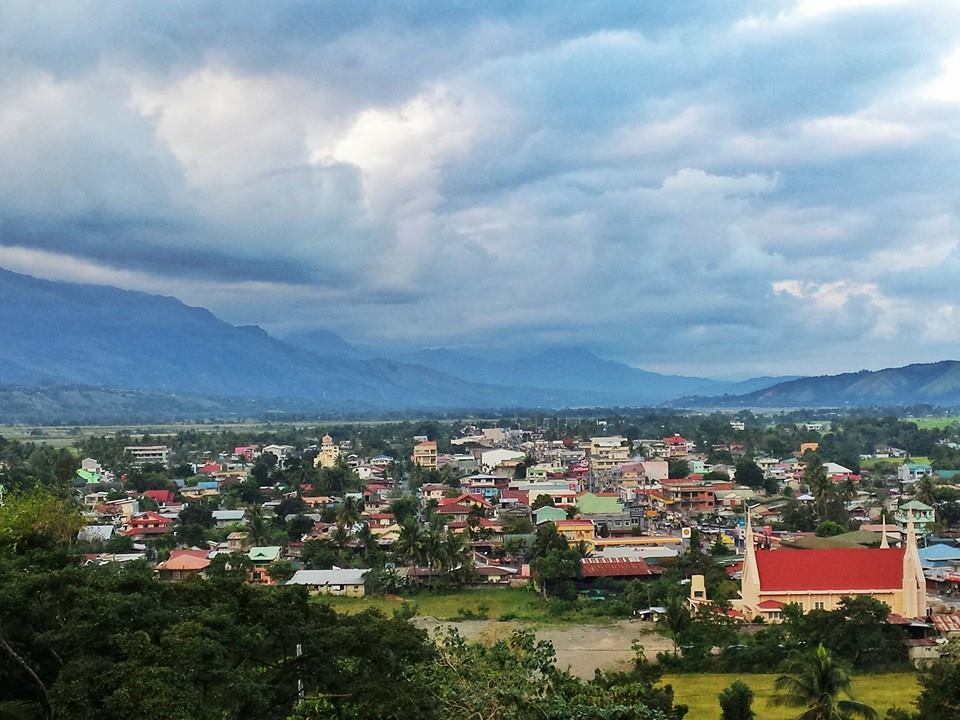
Aerial view

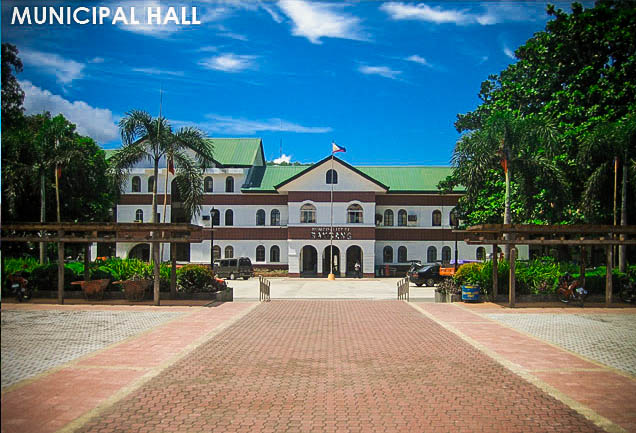
Municipal hall

Bambang is part of the lone congressional district of the province of Nueva Vizcaya. It is governed by a mayor, designated as its local chief executive, and by a municipal council as its legislative body in accordance with the Local Government Code. The mayor, vice mayor, and municipal councilors are elected directly in polls held every three years.

=== Elected officials ===
Members of the Municipal Council (2022–2025)
| Position | Name |
|---|---|
| Congressman | Tim Cayton |
| Governor | Jose Gambito |
| Mayor | Benjamin Ll. Cuaresma III |
| Vice-Mayor | Arnel G. Duldulao |
| Councilors | Alexander Calulot Jr. |
| Councilors | Mark Joel P. Balgos |
| Councilors | Arnel G. Magdirila |
| Councilors | Aira Mae Viloria |
| Councilors | Leoncio P. Allas |
| Councilors | George F. Atabay |
| Councilors | Freddie Ramel |
| Councilors | Alejandro Pamittan |

=== Former Mayors of Bambang ===
- Luisa Lloren Cuaresma: 1989–1998
- Dr. Pepito D. Balgos M.d.: 1998–2007
- Benjamin L.Cuaresma III: 2007–2010
- Atty. Flaviano D. Balgos, Jr.: 2010–2019
- Dr. Pepito D. Balgos M.d.: 2019–2022
- Benjamin L.Cuaresma III: 2022–Present

== Education ==
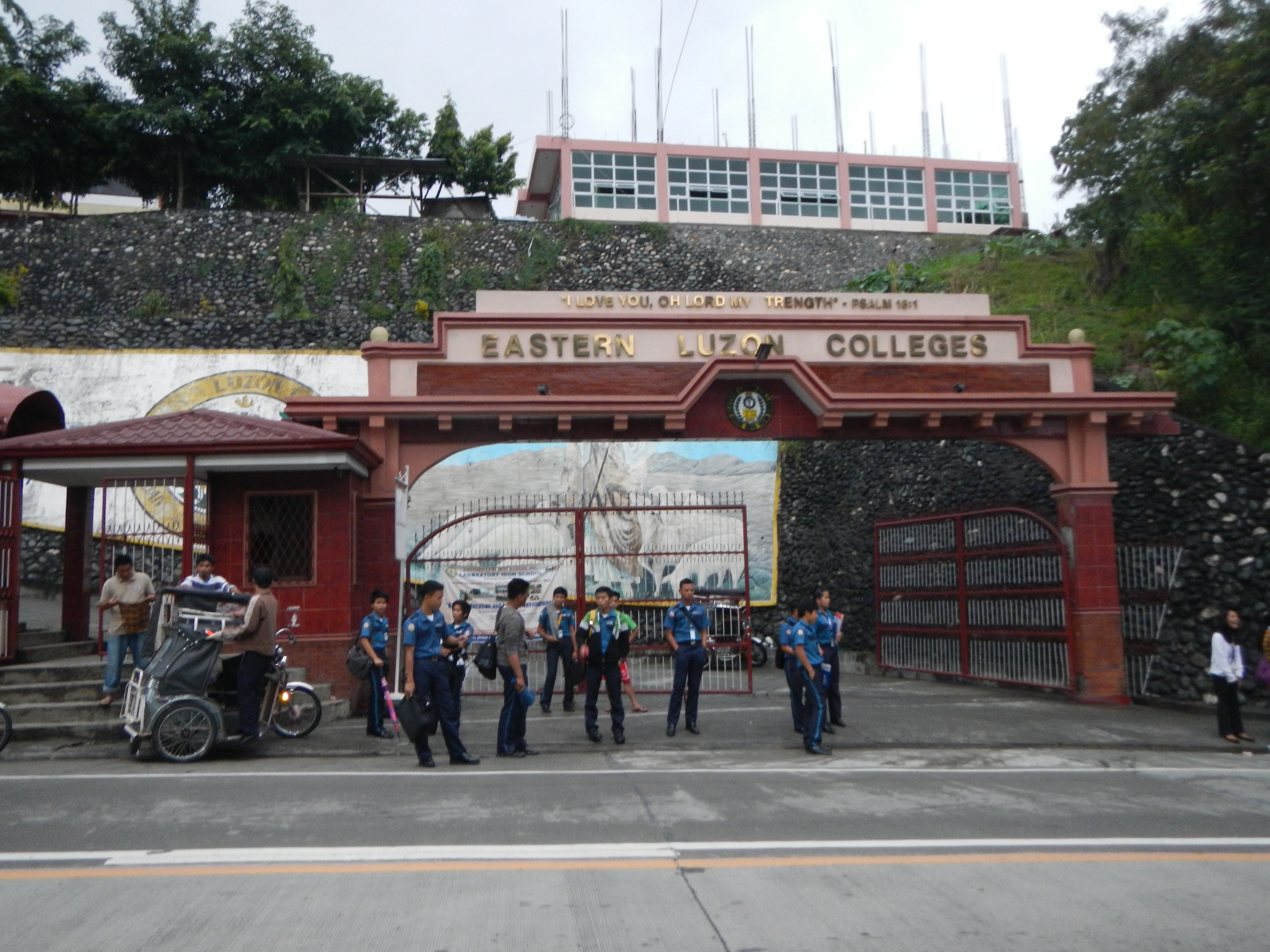
Eastern Luzon College

The Schools Division of Nueva Vizcaya governs the town's public education system. The division office is a field office of the DepEd in Cagayan Valley region. There are two schools district offices which govern all the public and private elementary and high schools throughout the municipality. These are:

- Bambang I Schools District
- Bambang II Schools District

=== Primary and elementary schools ===
- Abian Elementary School
- Abinganan Elementary School
- Aliaga Annex Primary School
- Aliaga Elementary School
- Almaguer North Elementary School
- Almaguer South Elementary School
- Aurora Christian School Foundation
- Bambang Central School
- Bambang East Elementary School
- Bambang North Central School
- Bambang West Elementary School
- Barat Elementary School
- California Academy
- Camella SNV Montessori School
- Dullao Elementary School
- Indiana Elementary School
- Kiddie Kingdom International School
- Labni Elementary School
- Mabuslo Elementary School
- Macate Elementary School
- Mauan Elementary School
- Nangcalapan Primary School
- Pallas Elementary School
- Saint Catherine's School
- Salicpan Elementary School
- Salinas Elementary School
- San Antonio North Elementary School
- San Antonio South Elementary School
- San Fernando Elementary School
- San Leonardo Elementary School
- Sto. Nino Primary School

=== Secondary schools ===
- Bambang National High School
- King's College of the Philippines (formerly: Eastern Luzon Colleges)
- Philippine Science High School Cagayan Valley Campus
- Saint Catherine's School
- Salinas High School
- Sto. Domingo Integrated School

=== Higher educational institutions ===
- Advocates College
- King's College of the Philippines (formerly: Eastern Luzon Colleges)
- Nueva Vizcaya State University

== Notable personalities ==
- Xyza Cruz Bacani (b. 1987), photographer
- Luisa Lloren Cuaresma (b. 1955), politician
- Darren Espanto (b. 2001), actor
- Marina Summers (b. 1996), drag performer

== Gallery ==
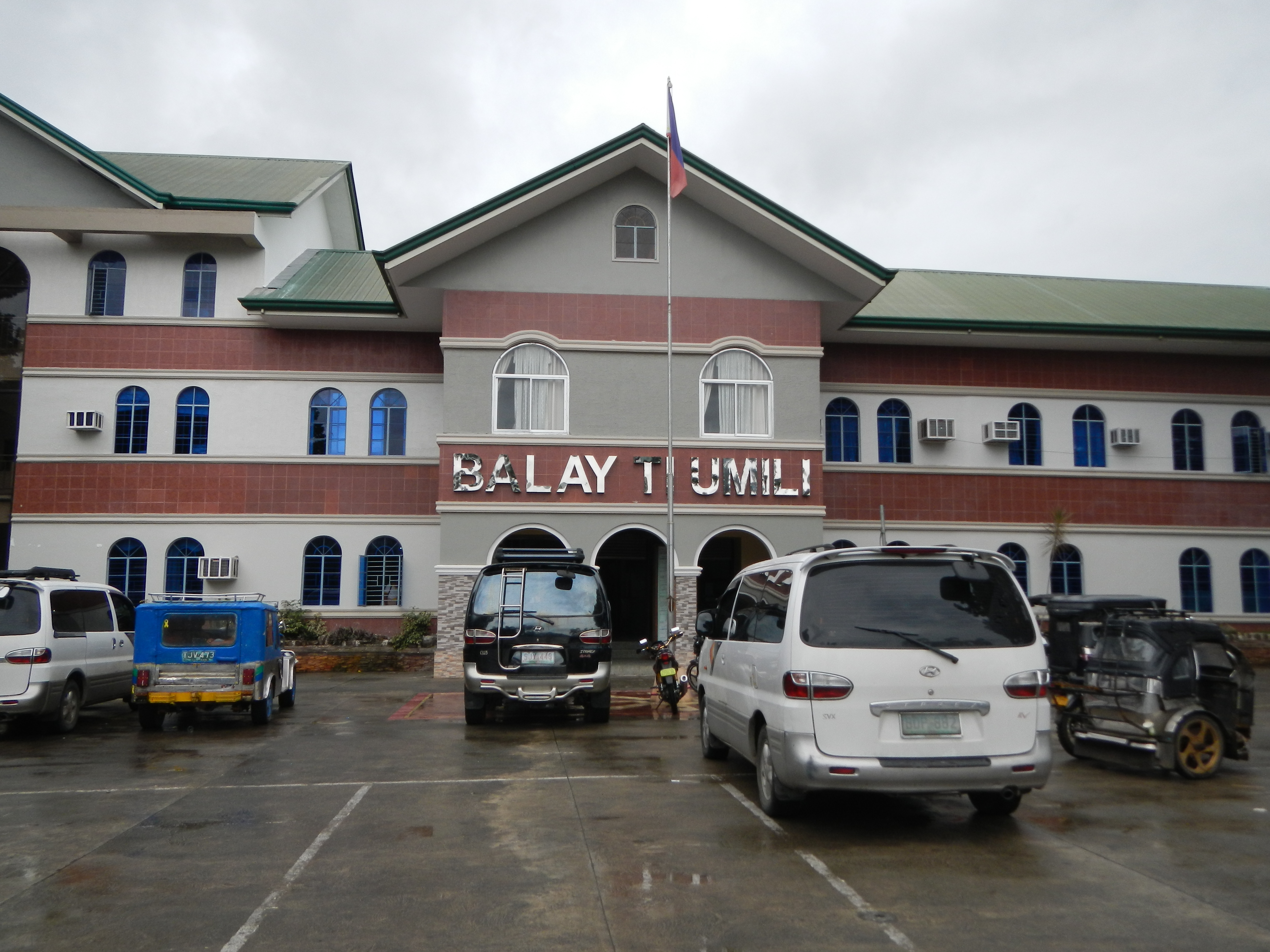
Bambang Municipal Hall

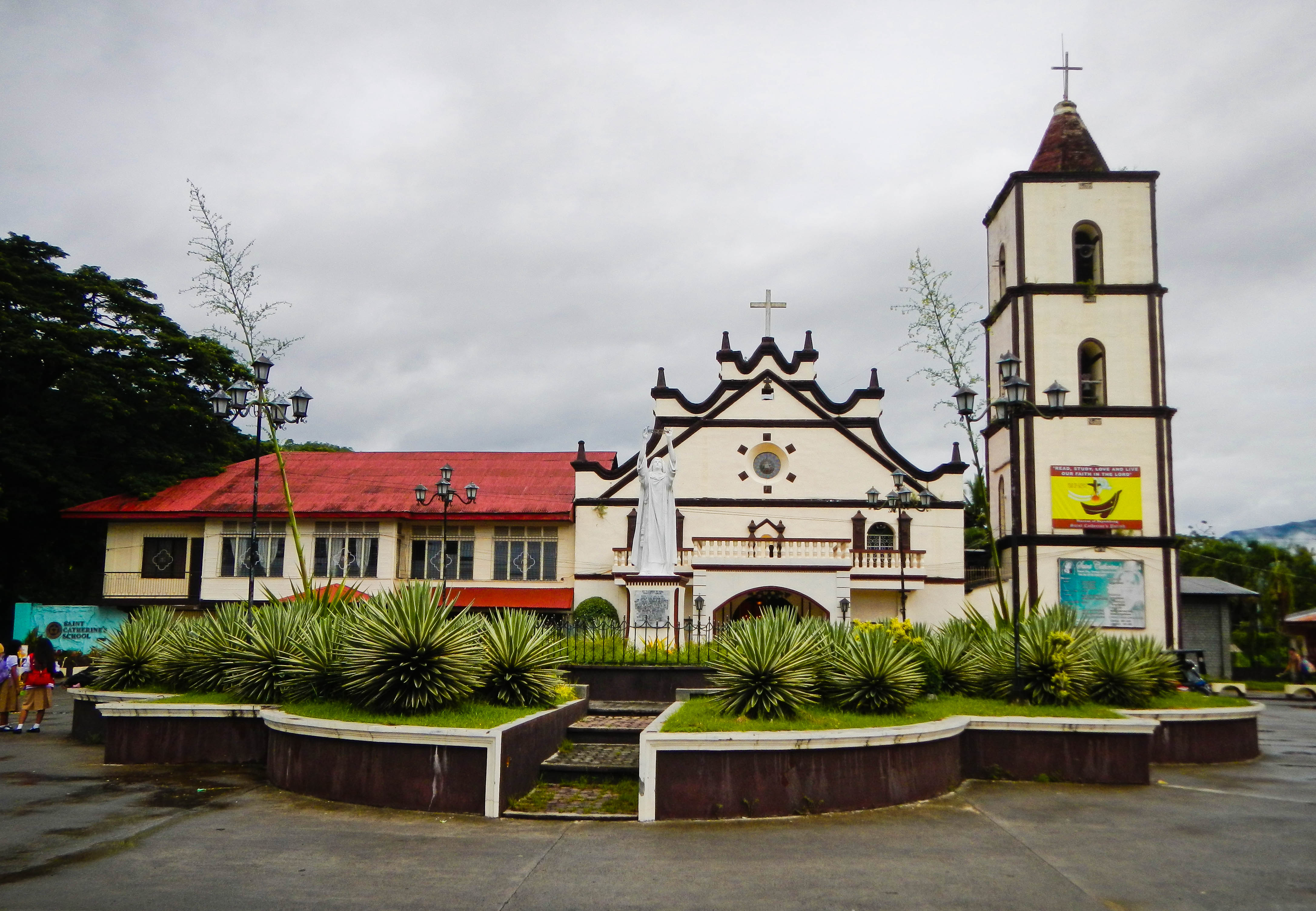
Saint Catherine of Siena Parish Church

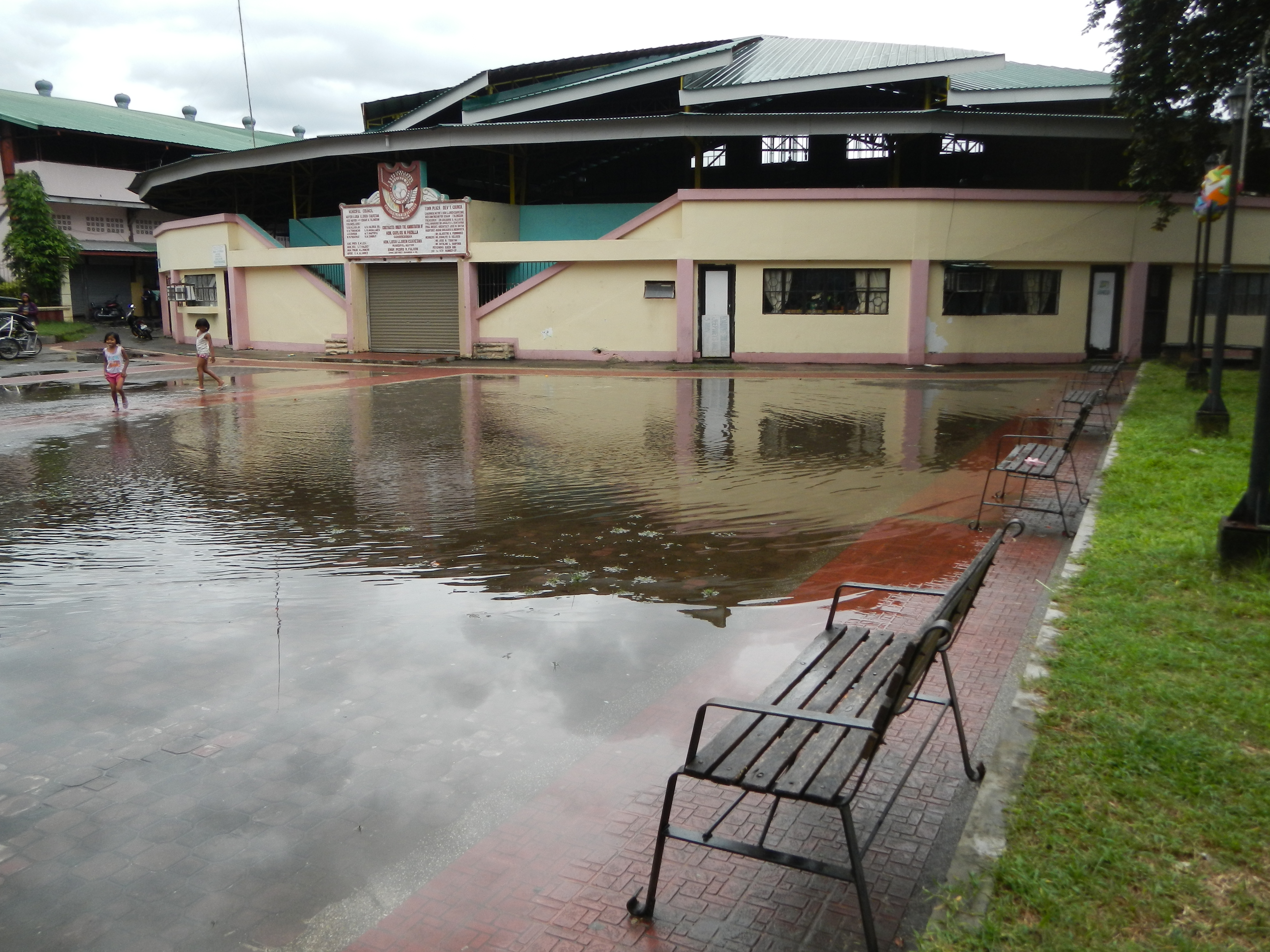
Bambang Gymnasium

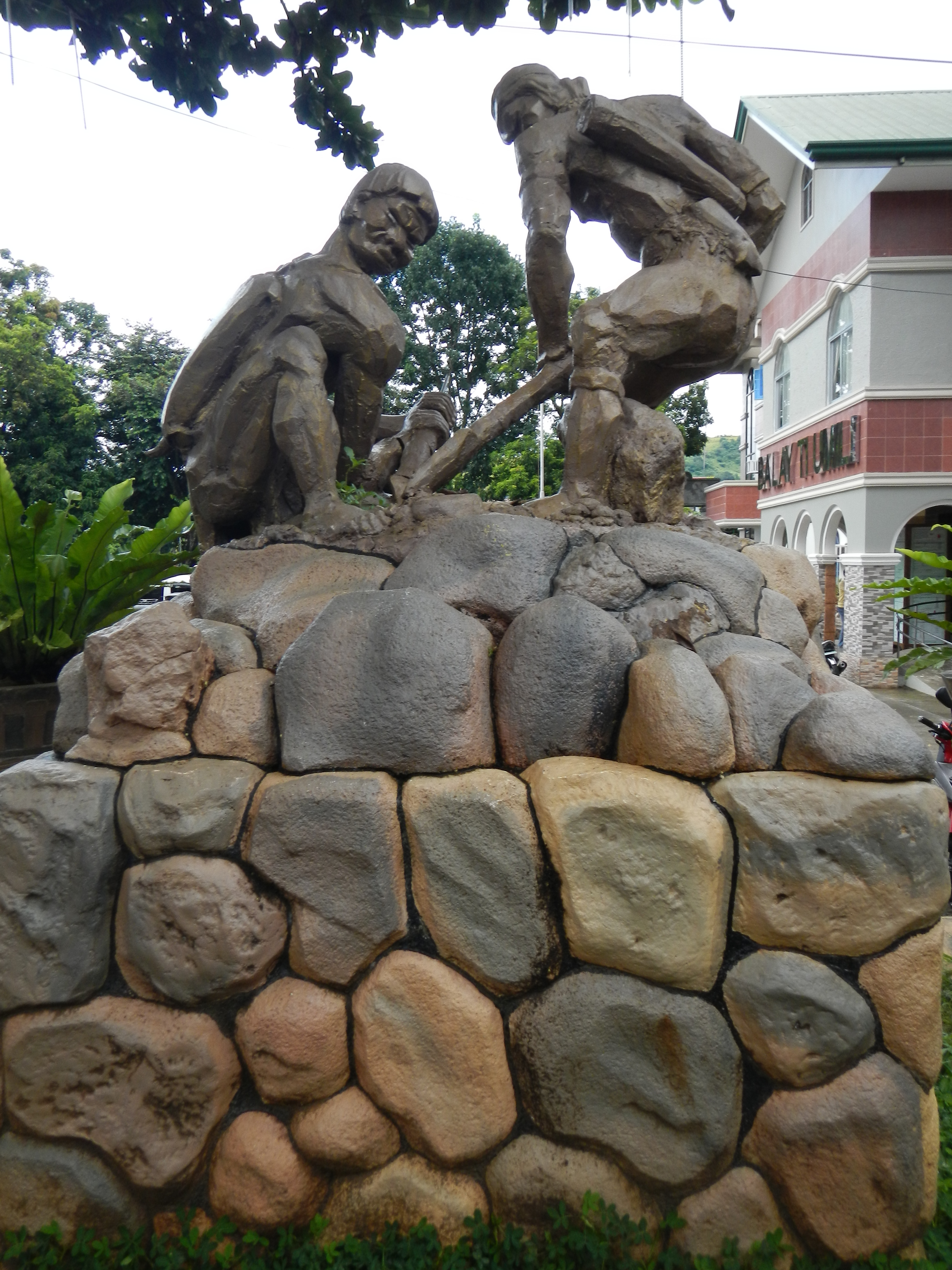
Bambang (agriculture) Monument

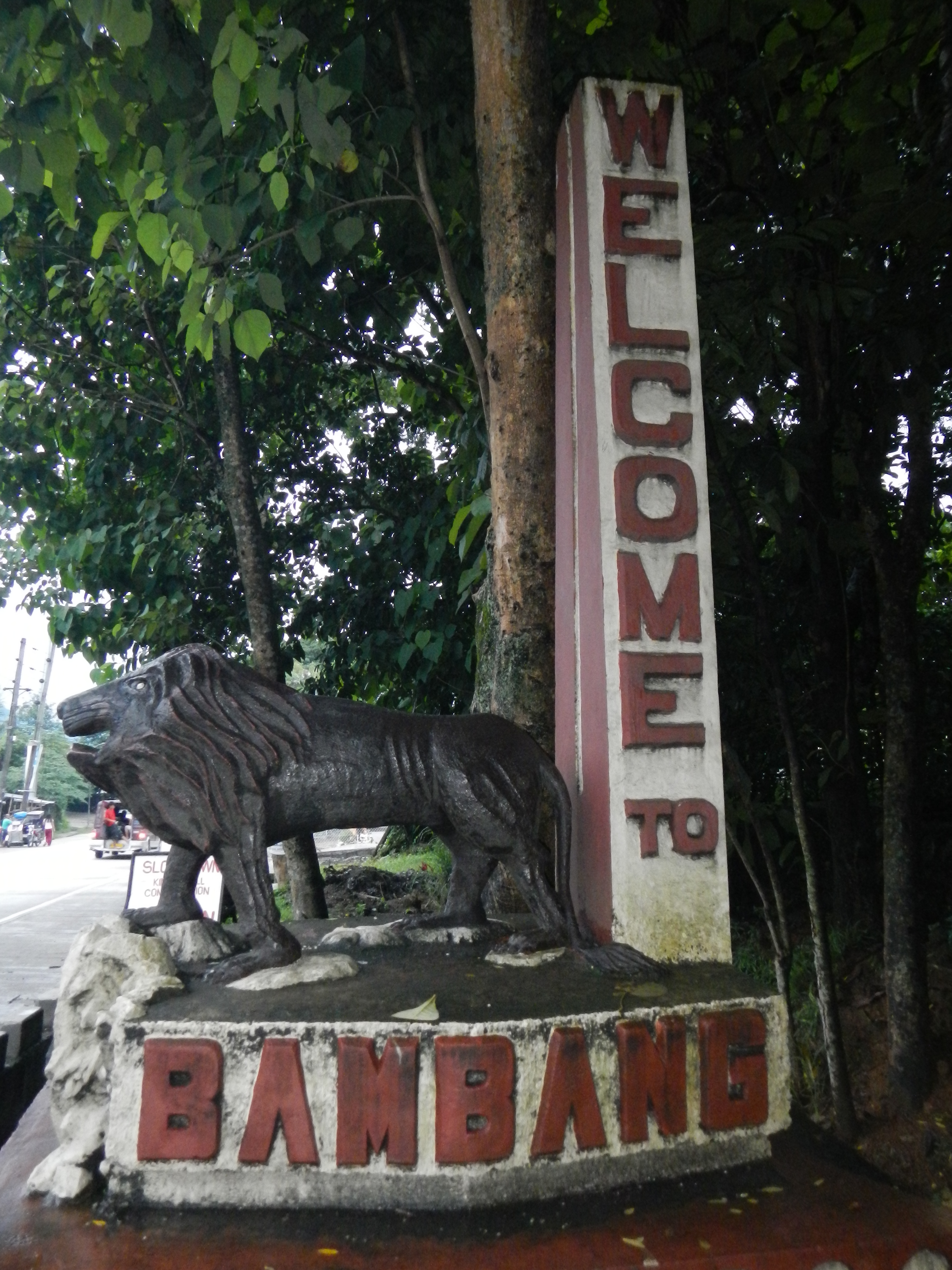
Welcome Lion Monument
