= DYDR =

Radio station in Tacloban, Philippines

FMR Tacloban (DYDR)
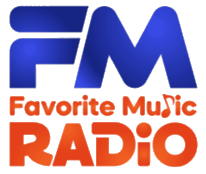
- Tacloban; Philippines
- Broadcast area: Northern Leyte, southern Samar
- Frequency: 100.7 MHz
- Branding: 100.7 FMR

Programming
- Languages: Waray, Filipino
- Format: Contemporary MOR, News, Talk
- Network: FM Radio Philippines
- Affiliations: DZMM Radyo Patrol 630/DZMM TeleRadyo; ABS-CBN News (for TV Patrol newscast); PRTV Prime Media (for Arangkada Balita newscast)

Ownership
- Owner: Philippine Collective Media Corporation
- Sister stations: PRTV Tacloban

History
- First air date: April 25, 2011
- Former names: Thunder FM (2011–2015); Kaugop Radio (2015–2021)

Technical information
- Licensing authority: NTC
- Class: C, D, E
- Power: 5,000 watts
- ERP: 25,000 watts
- Repeaters: Catbalogan: DYPF 106.9 MHz; Calbayog: DYPC 88.5 MHz; Borongan: DYPA 101.7 MHz; Catarman: 91.7 MHz

Links
- Webcast: Listen Live via AMFMPH

DYDR (100.7 FM), on-air as 100.7 FMR, is a radio station owned and operated by the Philippine Collective Media Corporation. Its studios and transmitter are located at the 3rd floor, Tingog Community Center, Real St. cor. Calanipawan Rd., Brgy. Sagkahan, and Remedios Trinidad Romualdez Hospital Compound, Brgy. Calanipawan, Tacloban.

On May 6, 2024, ABS-CBN's flagship newscast TV Patrol begin airing on this station along with other selected Favorite Music Radio stations nationwide.
