= Calbayog =

Component city in Samar, Philippines

- Component city
- City of Calbayog
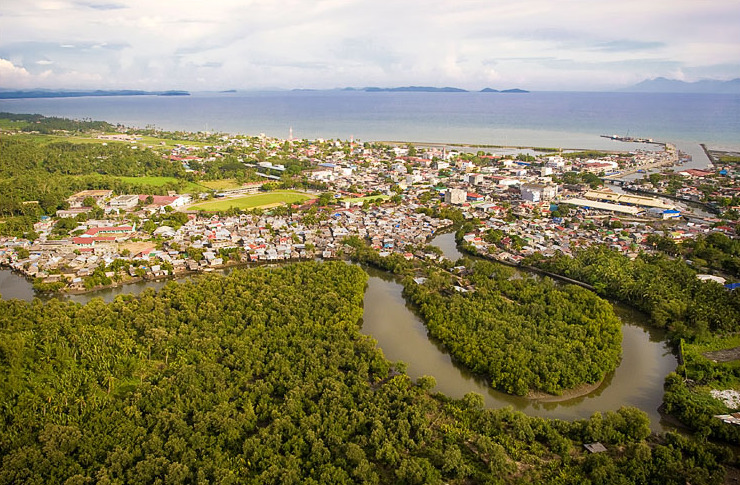
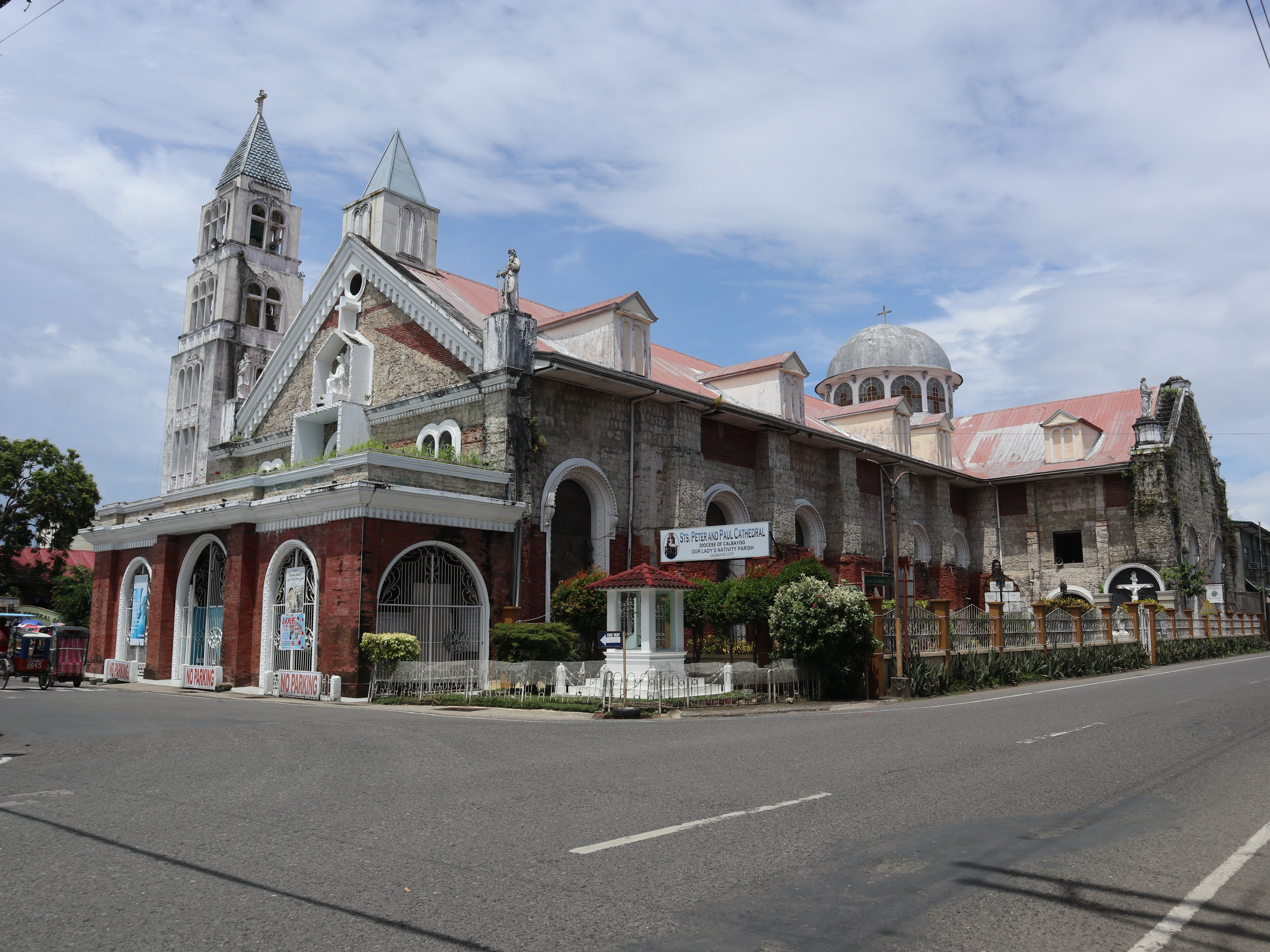
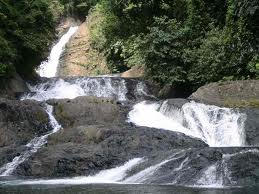
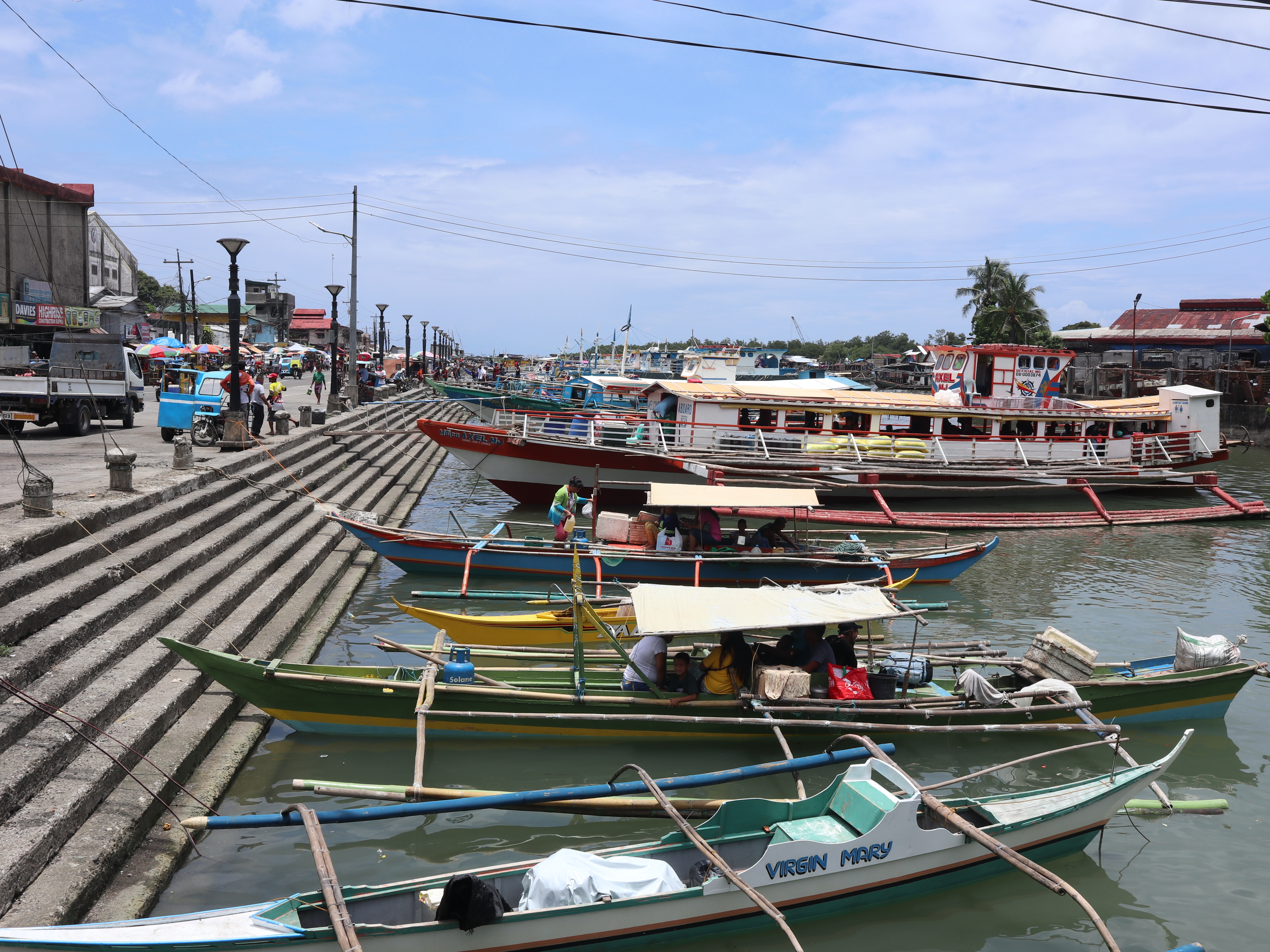
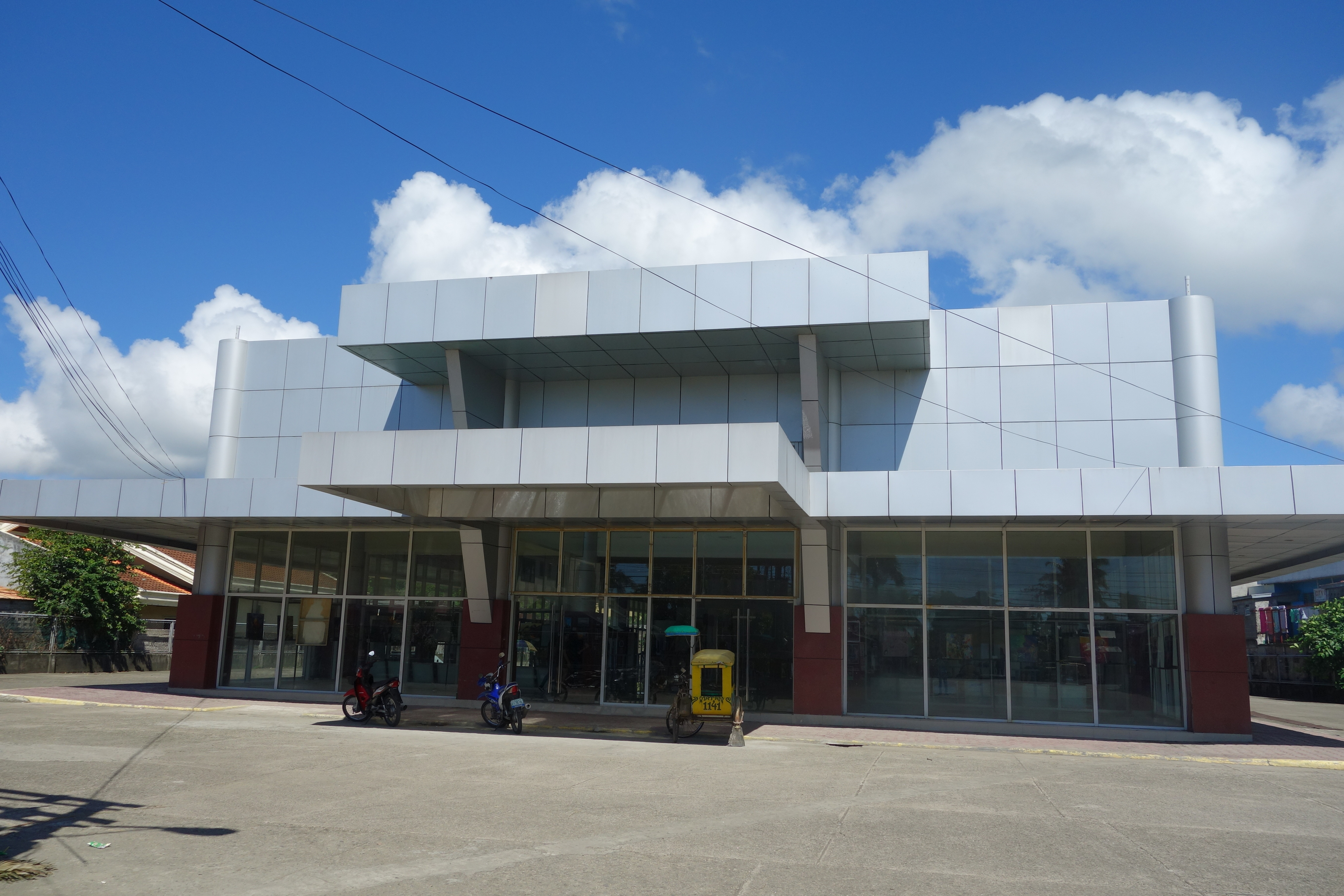
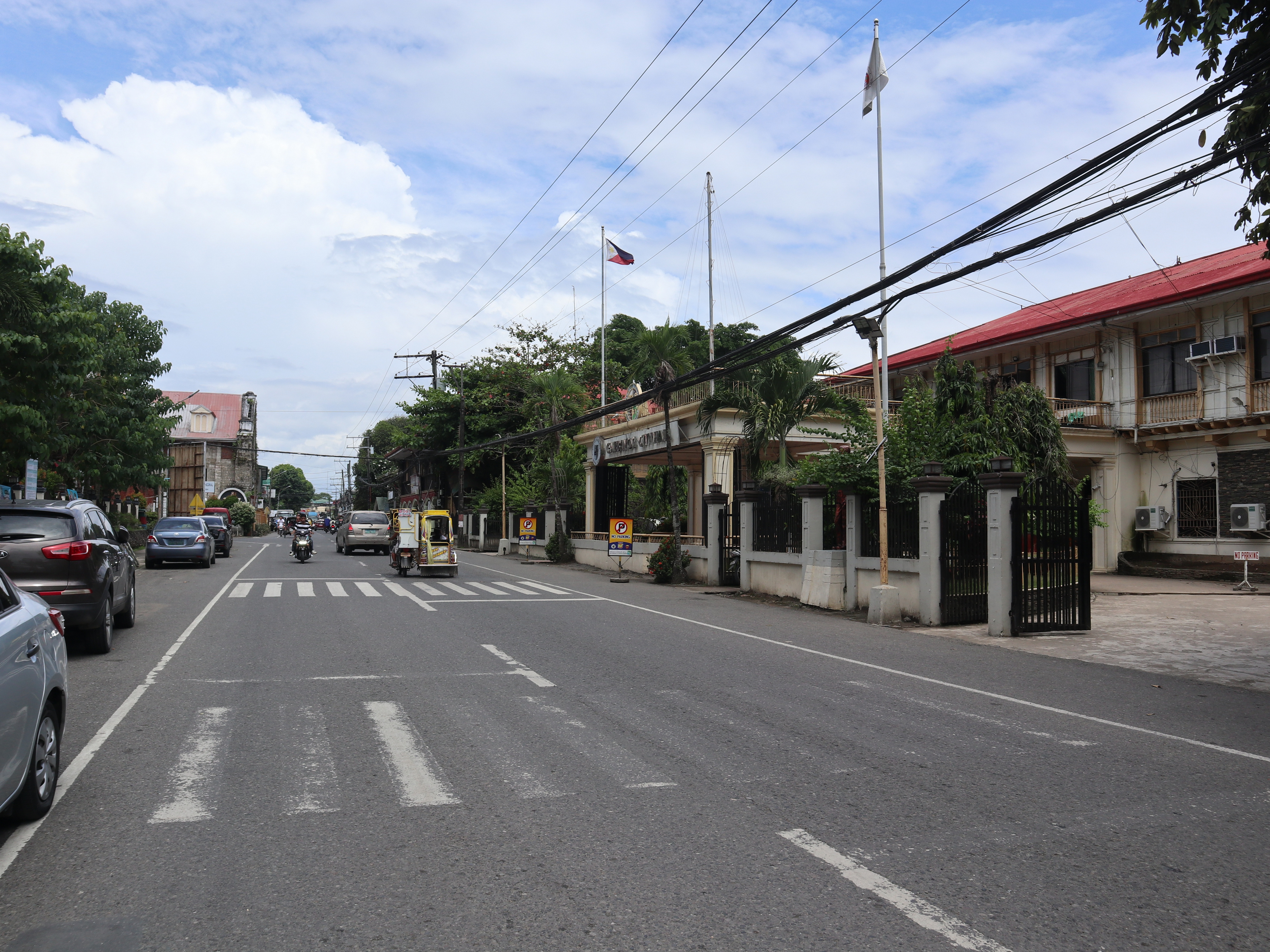
- Skyline of Calbayog Calbayog Cathedral Bangon Bugtong Falls Port of Calbayog Calbayog City Convention Center Calbayog City Hall

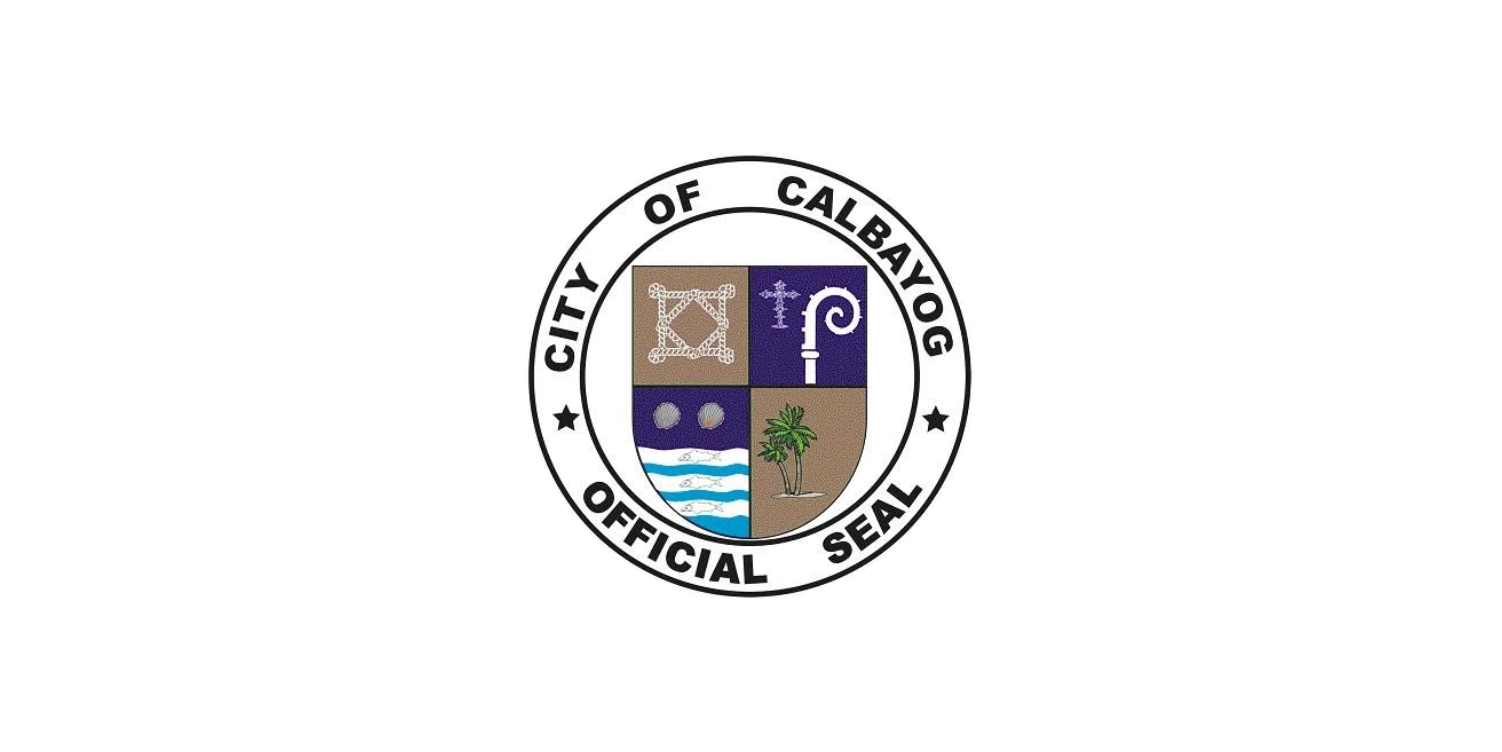
- Flag Seal
- Nicknames: A City of Waterfalls; Gateway to the North
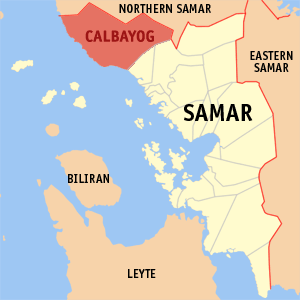
- Map of Samar with Calbayog highlighted
- Interactive map of Calbayog
- Location within the Philippines
- Coordinates: 12°04′01″N 124°35′41″E
- Country: Philippines
- Region: Eastern Visayas
- Province: Samar
- District: 1st district
- Cityhood: October 16, 1948
- Barangays: 157 (see Barangays)

Government
  - Type: Sangguniang Panlungsod
  - Mayor: Raymund C. Uy
  - Vice Mayor: Rex M. Daguman
  - Representative: Stephen James Tan
  - City Council: List: 1st District; • Christopher G. Corsiga; • Sylvan Josef B. Ayong; • Rosalia P. Chuca; • Minda D. Pasacas; • Billy J. Martires; • Abbie Joy A. Irigon; 2nd District; • Aquilina P. Sabi; • Charlito L. Coñejos; • Cesar T. Sabenecio; • Alex R. Gelera; • Marcial P. Aquino; DILG Masterlist of Officials
  - Electorate: 151,946 voters (2025)

Area
  - Total: 880.74 km^{2} (340.06 sq mi)
- Elevation: 63 m (207 ft)
- Highest elevation: 851 m (2,792 ft)
- Lowest elevation: 0 m (0 ft)

Population (2024 census)
  - Total: 187,848
  - Density: 213.28/km^{2} (552.40/sq mi)
  - Households: 43,030
- Demonym: Calbayognon

Economy
  - Income class: 1st city income class
  - Poverty incidence: 27.35% (2023)
  - Revenue: ₱ 2,062 million (2024)
  - Assets: ₱ 6,292 million (2024)
  - Expenditure: ₱ 1,851 million (2024)
  - Liabilities: ₱ 753.9 million (2024)

Service provider
  - Electricity: Samar 1 Electric Cooperative (SAMELCO 1)
- Time zone: UTC+8 (PST)
- ZIP code: 6710
- PSGC: 0806003000
- IDD : area code: +63 (0)55
- Native languages: Waray; Tagalog
- Website: www.calbayog.gov.ph

Calbayog, officially the City of Calbayog (Waray: Siyudad san Calbayog; Filipino: Lungsod ng Calbayog), is a component city in the province of Samar, Philippines. According to the 2024 census, it has a population of 187,848 people.

It lies along the coastal region of the province stretching about 60 miles (97 km) from the northern tip of the island and 180 miles (290 km) from southern boundaries.

It is the sixth largest city in terms of land and water areas in the Philippines. It is the nineteenth city of the Philippines. In 2020, Calbayog has 37,807 households with a population of 186,960 people, making up 24.7% of the total population of the province of Samar which is the most populous. Calbayog is one of the commercial trade centers in Eastern Visayas. Calbayog is subdivided into three major districts: Calbayog, Tinambacan and Oquendo.

== History ==
=== Unraveling of Revolutionary Society, Katipunan ===
After the exile of Rizal in Dapitan, the Katipunan was born in Binondo, Manila. Andres Bonifacio and his men moved heaven and earth to fight against the Spanish government then led by Gob. Heneral Polavieja. The katipunan expanded its membership from Luzon down to the Visayas Region, thereby increasing the number of Katipuneros in a span of one year. Sensing the secret plan of the Katipunan to overthrow the government, the Spanish authorities raided a Binondo printing press where subversive documents were found and confiscated. One of the documents seized was the list of members of the Katipunan. The name Benedicto Nijaga was one in the list, being the collector of revolutionary funds in the area. Upon learning of the arrests, Governor Polavieja ordered the arrest of all suspected members of the Katipunan. Nijaga was arrested together with twelve other katipuneros while campaigning for revolutionary funds. Shortly after they were jailed and reportedly tortured, a trial ensued, reminiscent of that of Rizal and other Filipino nationalists. The 13 men were convicted and sentenced to death. On January 11, 1897, the thirteen were taken to Bagumbayan field under heavy guard. Just before sunrise, the men were executed.

=== After Spain transferred power to USA ===
On October 23, 1903, the entire municipality of Weyler (present-day barangay Tinambacan) and a portion of Santa Rita were merged with Calbayog by virtue of Act No. 960. Santa Rita later restored its municipal status on October 31, 1906.

Colegio-Seminario de San Vicente de Paul (now Christ the King College and St. Vincent de Paul Seminary) were established in 1905 and La Milagrosa Academy was established in 1910.

On April 10, 1910, the Roman Catholic Diocese of Calbayog was created by virtue of the Papal Bull of Pope Pius X, comprising the islands of Samar and Leyte. Calbayog became the episcopal see of the diocese.

==== World War II and later ====
In 1942, the Japanese Army occupied Calbayog city. In 1945 the city was finally liberated by the Philippine Commonwealth troops and the guerrillas who had continued the fight against the Japanese throughout World War II. It was only much later that other dioceses in the region were created.

Republic Act No. 328, otherwise known as the City Charter of Calbayog was signed into law on July 15, 1948, by then President Elpidio Quirino. The first set of city officials, incumbent municipal officials of the place, were sworn in on October 16, 1948. The city comprises the territorial jurisdiction of the former Municipalities of Calbayog, Oquendo and Tinambacan.

=== 2008: Death of a Judge ===
In January 2008 Roberto Navidad, a Regional Trial Court (RTC) judge was shot dead in Calbayog City outside a drug store at the corner of Gomez Street and Nijaga Boulevard. As of 2008, the crime was still unsolved. He was the 15th judge to be ambushed in the Philippines since July 20, 1999 (the 14th under the Arroyo government).

=== 2011 Onwards: Political Deaths ===
On May 1, 2011, Calbayog's Mayor Reynaldo Uy was murdered by unknown gunmen. After his death, Vice-Mayor Ronaldo P. Aquino was sworn in as city mayor.

On March 8, 2021, approximately 10 years after the death of Mayor Uy, Mayor Ronaldo P. Aquino was ambushed and killed by members of the Samar Provincial Police while on his way to his son's birthday party. The van he was riding was pelted with multiple bullets from high-powered arms. Two of his personnel were also among the casualties of the ambush. Vice Mayor Diego P. Rivera has been appointed as successor and served as Mayor of Calbayog City until June 30, 2022.

On June 9, 2021, a senate investigation led by Senator Ronald "Bato" de la Rosa was conducted where the PNP, NBI and members of the Aquino family presented their testimonies and findings. Charges have been filed on the policemen. As of the 2022 election, Raymund "Monmon" Uy is now the city's mayor.

=== Upgrade of city status ===
On November 11, 2021, Samar 1st district congressman Edgar Mary Sarmiento proposed to convert the city of Calbayog from being a component city into an independent component city through the virtue of House Bill No. 10483, of the 18th Congress.

== Geography ==
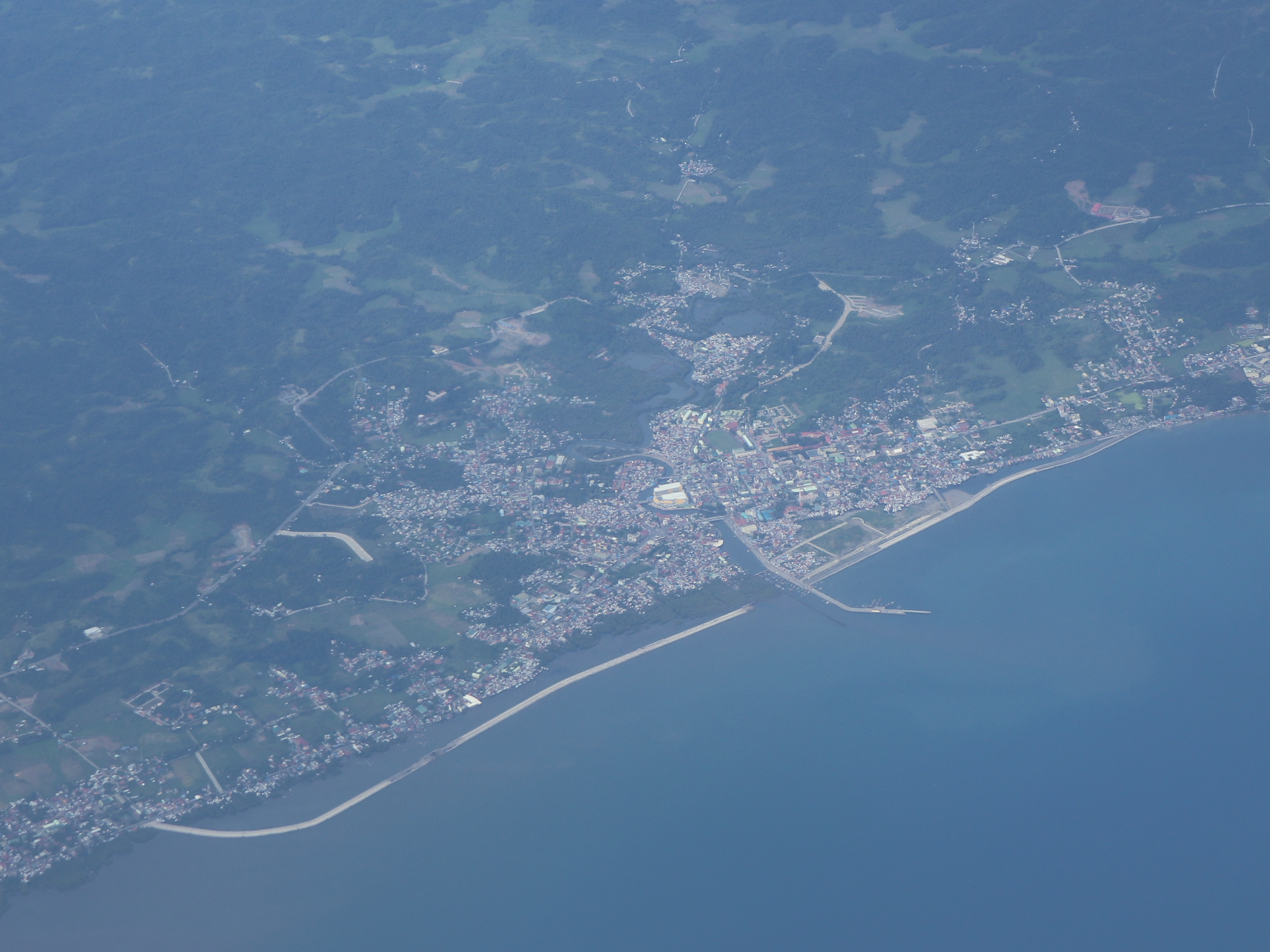
Calbayog from air

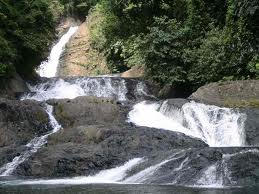
Bangon Falls

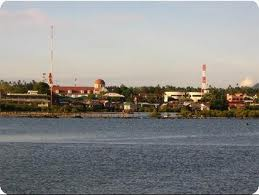
Calbayog as viewed from Samar Sea

The city has a total land area of 88,074 hectares (217,640 acres) as of 2007 which is 0.29% of the Philippines total land area, 3.79% of the regional land area, 6.12% of the island of Samar and 14.56% of the Samar province area.

Forty percent of the city's land area are plain and hilly terrains with elevation ranging from 5 to 20 meters (16 to 66 ft) above sea level. The rest are rugged mountain ranges with elevations from 300 to 700 meters (980 to 2,300 ft) above sea level. Flooding is minimized because of many rivers, brooks, streams and natural water conveyors that flow towards the sea.

=== Climate ===
Calbayog experiences a variety of wind types: Amihan (northeastwind), Timog (southwind), Habagat (southwestwind), Canaway (northwest wind), Cabunghan (east wind), Dumagsa (southeast wind) and Salatan (west wind).

Calbayog has well distributed rainfall throughout the year, except during the summer months of February through May, when most parts of the city are dry. The highest rainfall intensity recorded is 267 millimetres (10.5 in) per hour. Heavy downpour is seldom experienced in the locality, therefore making Calbayog potentially appropriate for protective agricultural investment.

Climate data for Calbayog City
Month	Jan	Feb	Mar	Apr	May	Jun	Jul	Aug	Sep	Oct	Nov	Dec	Year
Mean daily maximum °C (°F)	28 (82)	29 (84)	29 (84)	31 (88)	31 (88)	30 (86)	29 (84)	29 (84)	29 (84)	29 (84)	29 (84)	28 (82)	29 (85)
Mean daily minimum °C (°F)	21 (70)	21 (70)	21 (70)	22 (72)	24 (75)	24 (75)	24 (75)	25 (77)	24 (75)	24 (75)	23 (73)	22 (72)	23 (73)
Average precipitation mm (inches)	72 (2.8)	52 (2.0)	65 (2.6)	62 (2.4)	87 (3.4)	129 (5.1)	153 (6.0)	124 (4.9)	147 (5.8)	157 (6.2)	139 (5.5)	117 (4.6)	1,304 (51.3)
Average rainy days	17.4	13.4	16.8	18.0	22.0	25.3	26.2	24.2	24.9	26.0	23.3	20.8	258.3
Source: Meteoblue (modeled/calculated data, not measured locally)

=== Barangays ===
Calbayog is politically subdivided into 157 barangays. Each barangay consists of puroks and some have sitios.

These barangays are grouped in three districts.

==== Calbayog District ====
The district is located in the southern and eastern boundaries of the city and is the main political and commercial District the city. The district is bounded to the north by the Oquendo and Tinambacan districts, to the south by the municipality of Santa Margarita and to the east by Matuguinao. The district comprises 84 barangays and has a population of 103,051 (2015 census) with a land area of about 446.6 square kilometres (172.4 sq mi).

Barangays of the Calbayog District
- Acedillo
- Aguit-itan
- Alibaba
- Anislag
- Awang East
- Awang West
- Bagacay
- Bagong Lipunan
- Balud
- Basud
- Bontay
- Buenavista
- Cacaransan
- Cagbanayacao
- Cagboborac
- Cagsalaosao
- Cahumpan
- Calocnayan
- Canhumadac
- Capoocan
- Carayman
- Carmen
- Central
- Cogon
- Dagum
- Dinawacan
- Esperanza
- Gabay
- Gadgaran
- Gasdo
- Geraga-an
- Guimbaoyan Norte
- Guimbaoyan Sur
- Guin-on
- Hamorawon
- Helino
- Hibabngan
- Hibatang
- Higasaan
- Himalandrog
- Jacinto
- Jimautan
- Kalilihan
- Kilikili
- La Paz
- Langoyon
- Lonoy
- Looc
- Mabini I
- Mancol
- Matobato
- Maybog
- Maysalong
- Migara
- Naga
- Naguma
- Navarro
- Nijaga
- Obrero
- Olera
- Osmeña
- Pagbalican
- Palanas
- Palanogan
- Panonongan
- Patong
- Payahan
- Pinamorotan
- Rawis
- Rizal I and Sitio Caballero
- Roxas I
- Salvacion
- San Antonio
- San Isidro
- San Jose
- San Policarpio
- Saputan
- Sinantan
- Tabawan
- Tanval
- Tapa-e
- Tigbe
- Trinidad
- Victory
- Villahermosa

==== Tinambacan District ====
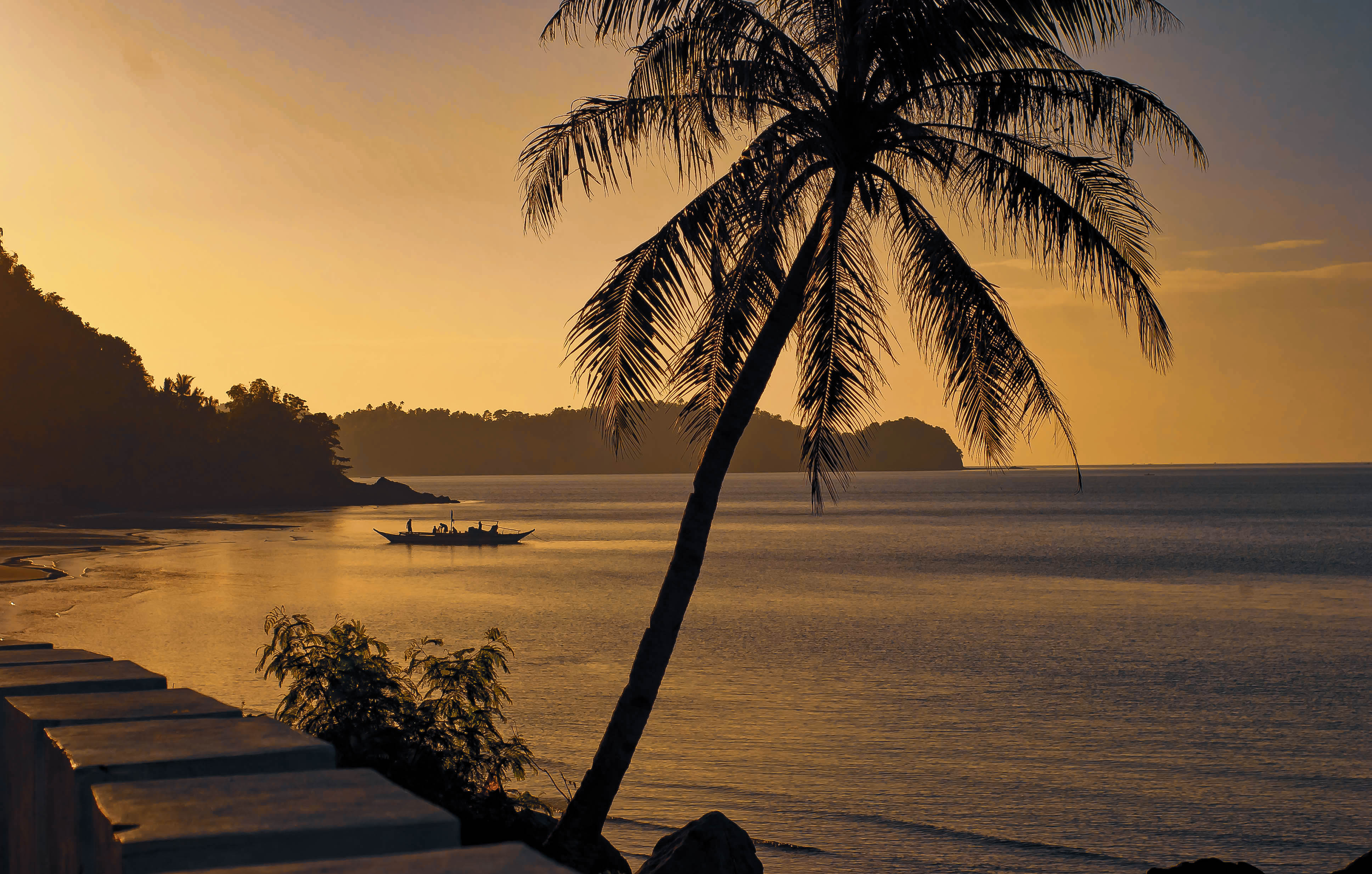
Shoreline along Barangay Malopalo

The Tinambacan district is located along the northern boundaries of the city, it is bounded to the north by the municipality of San Isidro, to the south by the Calbayog district and to the east by the Oquendo district. The district comprises 27 barangays and has a population of 46,157 (2015 census) with a land area of 182.9 square kilometres (70.6 sq mi).

Barangays of the Tinambacan District (27)
- Amampacang
- Ba-ay
- Bante
- Bantian
- Binaliw
- Bugtong
- Caglanipao Sur
- Cagmanipes Norte
- Cagmanipes Sur
- Cagnipa
- Cag-olango
- Cangomaod
- Danao I
- Danao II
- Malaga
- Malajog
- Malayog
- Malopalo
- Manguino-o
- Marcatubig
- Peña
- Saljag
- San Joaquin
- Tinambacan Norte
- Tinambacan Sur
- Tinaplacan
- Tomaliguez

==== Oquendo District ====
The Oquendo District is located along the northeastern boundaries of the city, it is bounded to the north by Lope De Vega, to the south by the Calbayog district, to the east by Silvino Lobos and to the west by the Tinambacan district. The district comprises 46 barangays and has a population of 34,643 (2015 census) with a land area of 251.2 square kilometres (97.0 sq mi).

Barangays of the Oquendo District (46)
- Baja
- Bayo
- Begaho
- Cabacungan
- Cabatuan
- Cabicahan
- Cabugawan
- Cag-anahaw
- Cag-anibong
- Cagbayang
- Cagbilwang
- Capacuhan
- Catabunan
- Caybago
- Dawo
- De Victoria
- Dinabongan
- Dinagan
- Hugon Rosales
- Jose A. Roño
- Lapaan
- Libertad
- Limarayon
- Longsob
- Mabini II
- Macatingog
- Mag-ubay
- Mantaong
- Manuel Barral Sr.
- Mawacat
- Nabang
- Obo-ob
- Oquendo
- Panlayahan
- Panoypoy
- Pilar
- Quezon
- Rizal II
- Roxas II
- San Rufino
- Sigo
- Sinidman Occidental
- Sinidman Oriental
- Talahiban
- Tarabucan

== Demographics ==
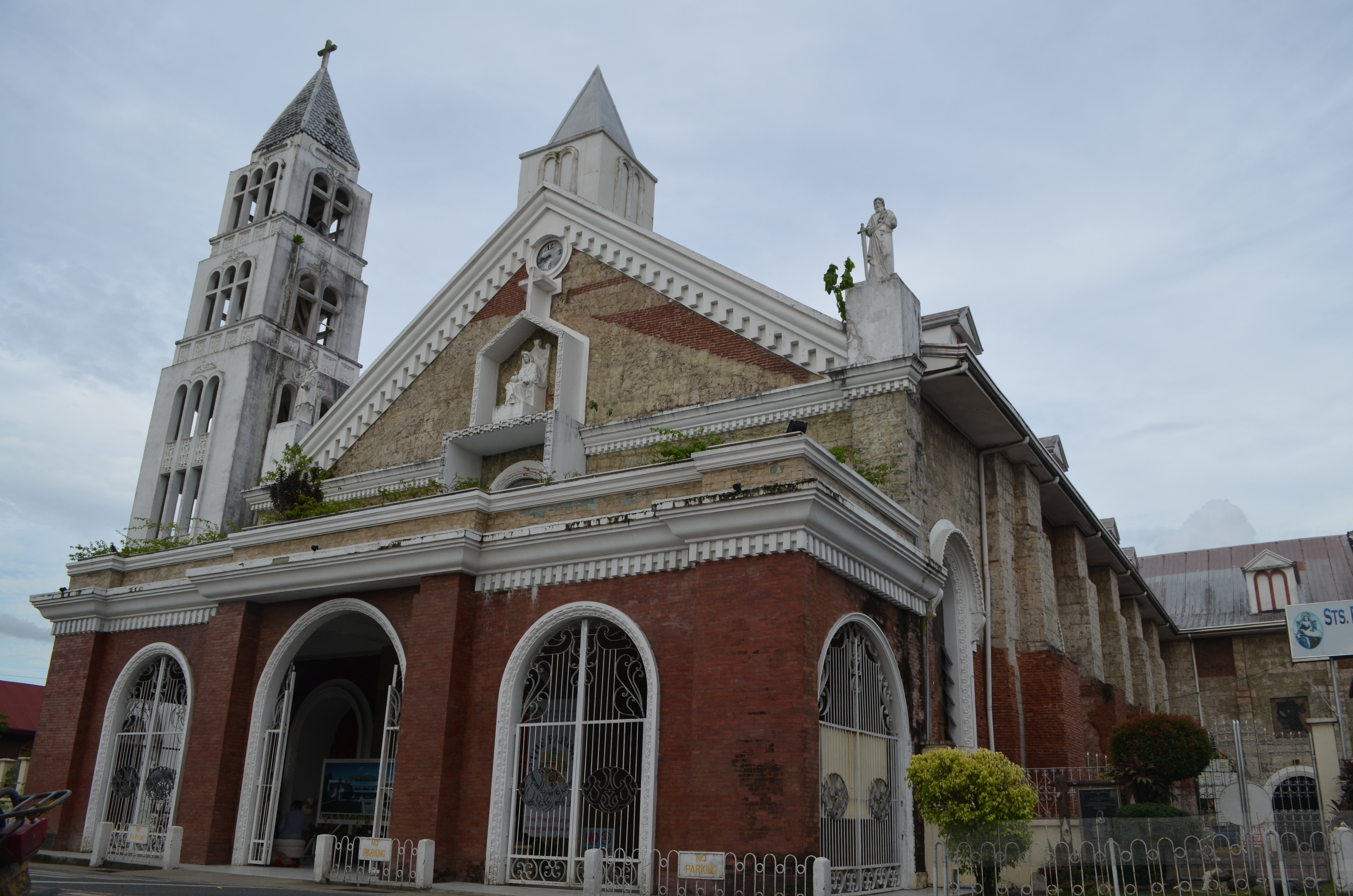
Saints Peter and Paul Cathedral

Population census of Calbayog

Year	Pop.	±% p.a.
1903	23,944	—
1918	44,566	+4.23%
1939	49,953	+0.54%
1948	79,503	+5.30%
1960	77,832	−0.18%
1970	94,323	+1.94%
1975	102,619	+1.70%
1980	106,719	+0.79%

Year	Pop.	±% p.a.
1990	115,390	+0.78%
1995	129,216	+2.14%
2000	147,187	+2.83%
2007	163,657	+1.47%
2010	172,778	+1.99%
2015	183,851	+1.19%
2020	186,960	+0.35%
2024	187,848	+0.11%

Source: Philippine Statistics Authority

According to the 2015 census, Calbayog has a population of 183,851 making up 23.6% of the entire population of Samar Province as of August 1, 2015.

== Economy ==
Poverty incidence of Calbayog (%)

Source: Philippine Statistics Authority

== Infrastructure ==
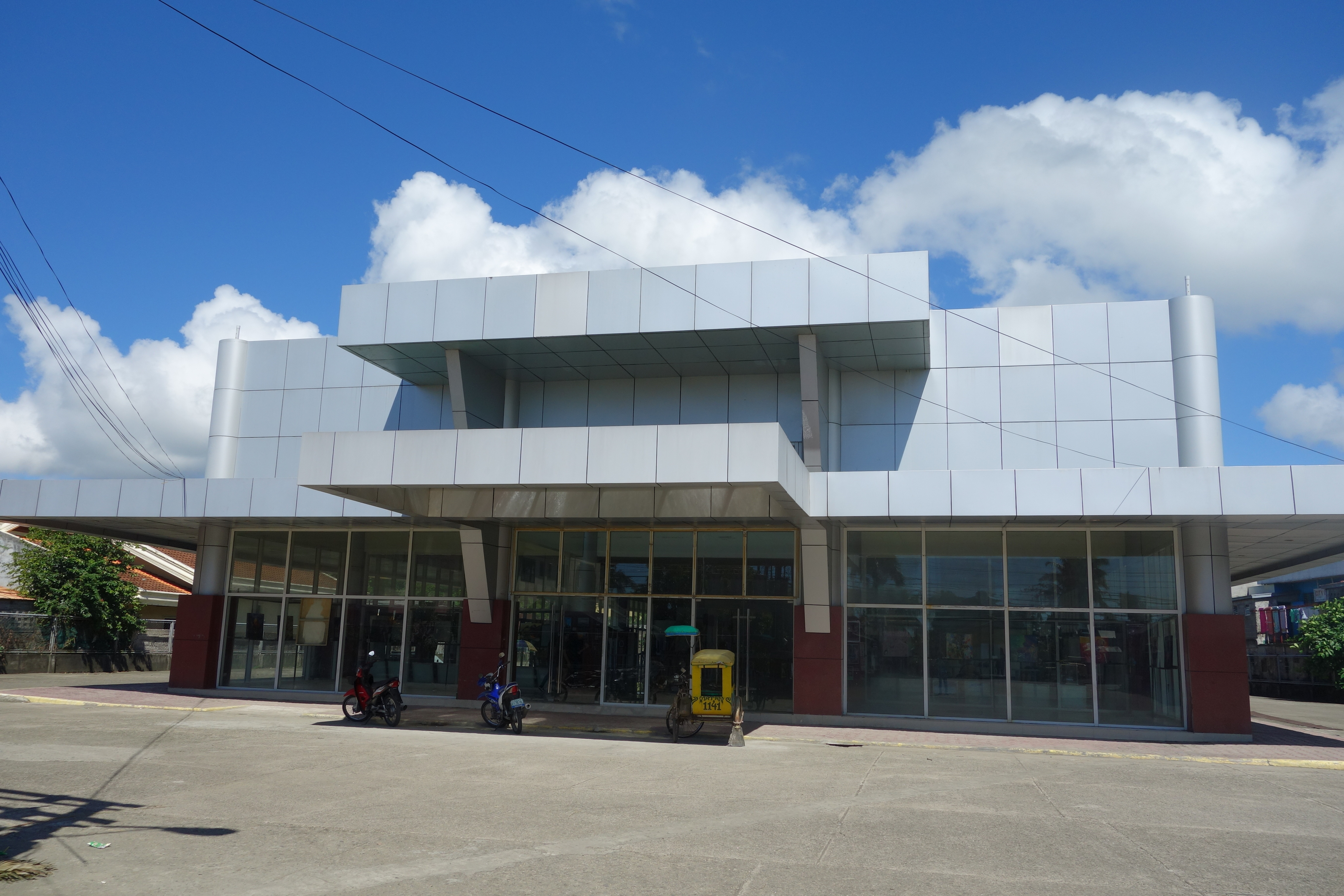
Calbayog City Convention Center

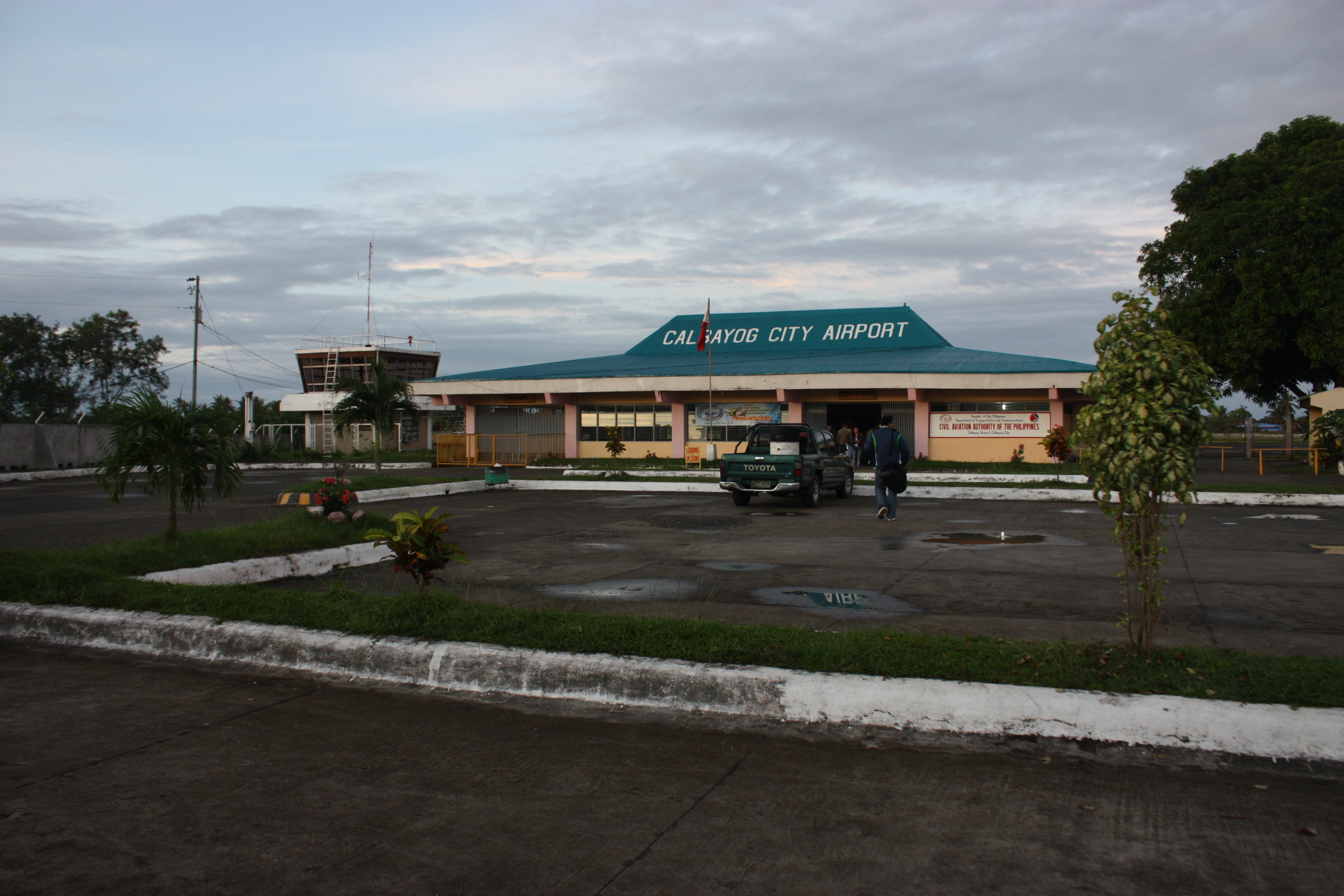
Calbayog Airport

=== Utilities ===
Water and Sanitation
Calbayog Water (now owned by Manila Water) is in charge of the water utility in Calbayog City. As of 2017, it was using the Himonini River and Pasungon Falls as water sources. The Dawu interior of Danaw, water reservoir, a dam was built for the Calbayog City Water District near Malajog. The dam was built for irrigation to nearby villages of Pilar and Dawu. The old dam or reservoir that was built near Oquendo is somewhat hefty and expensive since it uses river water and its expensive to purify the river water. The new reservoir was connected to the old pipelines of Calbayog City Water District. Some Fire truck Hydrants were located inside the City.

Energy and Power
Samar I Electric Cooperative, Inc. (SAMELCO I) is located in Carayman, Calbayog. It has three sub-stations powered by the Tongonan Geothermal Energy and transmissioned by National Grid Corporation of the Philippines (NGCP) to its main office in Carayman then to its three sub-stations at 3600 volts, stepped down.

== Education ==
=== Colleges and Universities ===
- Northwest Samar State University (formerly Tiburcio Tancinco Memorial Institute of Science and Technology)
- Christ the King College
- STI Calbayog
- Seminario San Vicente de Paul

=== Vocational School ===
- Rafael Lentejas Memorial School of Fisheries (Tinambacan) -honors-

=== High Schools and K-12 ===
- Calbayog City National High School
- Christ the King College
- Carayman National High School
- Bagacay Integrated School
- Rafael Lentejas Memorial School of Fisheries (Tinambacan and Santa Margarita Campus)
- La Milagrosa Academy
- Calbayog Pilot Central School
- Calbayog City SPED Center
- Calbayog East Central School
- Calbayog Christian Faith Academy
- Nijaga Elementary School
- Pena 1 National High School
- Pena 1 Elementary School
- Academia de San Agustin International School
- San Joaquin National High School
- San Joaquin Central School
- San Policarpo National High School
- San Policarpo Central School
- STI Calbayog Senior High School
- Tinambacan Central School
- Trinidad National High School (Tomaligues Annex Campus)
- Trinidad Central Elementary School
- Tarabucan National High School
- Mag-ubay National High School
- Oquendo National High School
- Tabawan Integrated School
- Acedillo Elementary School
- Gadgaran Integrated School
- Bantian Elementary School
- Binaliw Elementary School
- Cagbanayacao Elementary School
- Cagboborac Elementary School
- Caballero Elementary School
- Seven Hills National High School
- San Antonio Elementary School
- Nabang Elementary School
- Himalandrog Elementary School
- Naga Elementary School
- Olera Elementary School
- Matobato Elementary School
- Malopalo Elementary School
- Capoocan Elementary School
- Dagum Elementary School
- Cacaransan Elementary School
- Calbayog City Night HIgh School
- Alibaba Elementary School
- Tapae Elementary School
- Villahermosa Elementary School
- Victory Elementary School
- Calbayog Arts and Design School of Eastern Visayas (CADSEV)
- Calbayog Adventist Multigrade School

== Media ==
=== AM Radio Stations ===
- DYOG Radyo Pilipinas 882 (Philippine Broadcasting Service)

=== FM Radio Stations ===
- DYPC 88.5 - FMR Calbayog (Relay station of 100.7 FMR Tacloban; Philippine Collective Media Corporation)
- DYNW 89.5 - Kauswagan Radio (Northwest Samar State University)
- 91.3 Radyo Kidlat (Philippine Broadcasting Service/Samar 1 Electric Cooperative)
- 93.7 (Palawan Broadcasting Corporation)
- DWIZ - Lamrag Radio Calbayog 99.7 FM (Aliw Broadcasting Corporation)
- DYIX 100.5 - Brigada News FM (Brigada Mass Media Corporation)
- DYSI 104.9 - Radyo Natin Calbayog (Manila Broadcasting Company/Radyo Natin Network)

=== TV Stations ===
- GMA DYAS Ch. 5 - (GMA) - GMA Network, Inc.
- PTV DYMP Ch. 12 - PTV Calbayog (People's Television Network)
- IBC DYCP Ch. 17 - Intercontinental Broadcasting Corporation
- IBC DTTV Ch. 47 (Intercontinental Broadcasting Corporation)

=== Cable and Satellite ===
- Fil-Products Cable Company
- Calbayog Cable TV and Entertainment Services

== Notable personalities ==
- Lieutenant Benedicto Nijaga (1864–January 11, 1897) — nicknamed “Biktoy”, one of the "Thirteen Martyrs of Bagumbayan", executed on January 11, 1897, in Bagumbayan (Luneta Park).
- Alferez Biktoy — the namesake of a musical staged by the City Arts and Culture Office for the centennial celebration of Philippine independence
- José Avelino — Third President of the Philippine Senate
- Cardinal Julio Rosales — (September 18, 1906 – June 2, 1983) the second Archbishop of Cebu, was a Filipino cardinal of the Roman Catholic Church. A native of Calbayog, he made his studies at the Seminary of Calbayog and was ordained in his hometown on June 2, 1929. From 1929 to 1946, he did pastoral work in the diocese of Calbayog. He was consecrated bishop of Tagbilaran on September 21, 1946.
- Chito S. Roño — Film director, writer, producer, and businessman.

== See also ==
- Naval Base Calbayog
- Calbayog Airport
- Calbayog Cathedral
