= List of ABS-CBN Corporation channels and stations =

The following is a list of television and radio stations that were either affiliated or owned-and-operated by ABS-CBN.

It ceased its operations on May 5, 2020 after almost 32 years as per the National Telecommunications Commission's cease-and-desist order due to expiration of the latter's legislative franchise and subsequently the denial of its franchise application on July 10, 2020.

== Current radio stations ==
Branding	Callsign	Frequency	Power	Location	Notes
DZMM Radyo Patrol 630 (Note: Formerly fully-owned by ABS-CBN (100%) and formerly under the callsign of DZMM.)	DWPM	630 kHz	50 kW	Obando, Bulacan	Joint venture between Prime Media and ABS-CBN Corporation under a local marketing agreement with the latter having a 49% ownership in the venture.

== Former television stations ==
=== ABS-CBN (defunct) ===
==== Former analog broadcast stations ====
===== VHF =====
Callsign	Branding	Ch. #	Station Type	TPO	Location (Transmitter Site)
DWWX	ABS-CBN Manila (Note: Since January 5, 2022, the channel's frequency is assigned to Advanced Media Broadcasting System, currently under licensing agreement with ABS-CBN since 2024.)	2	Originating	60 kW (346.2 kW ERP)	Sergeant Esguerra Ave., Diliman, Quezon City
D-3-ZO	ABS-CBN Baguio	3	Originating	10 kW	Mt. Santo Tomas, Tuba, Benguet
D-11-ZZ	ABS-CBN Mountain Province	11	Relay	5 kW	Mt. Amuyao, Barlig, Mountain Province
DWRD	ABS-CBN Laoag	7	Relay	5 kW	Brgy. San Lorenzo, San Nicolas, Ilocos Norte
DZCG	ABS-CBN Vigan	11	Relay	0.1 kW	Mt. Caniao, Bantay, Ilocos Sur
DWAI	ABS-CBN Isabela	2	Relay	1 kW	JECO Building, Maharlika Hi-way, Brgy. Victory Norte, Santiago, Isabela
DWAF	ABS-CBN Tuguegarao	3	Relay	1 kW	Taft St. cor. Colleges Ave., Tuguegarao, Cagayan
DWAX	ABS-CBN Aparri	9	Relay	1 kW	Hi-Class Bldg., De Rivera St., Aparri, Cagayan
DWCM	ABS-CBN Batanes	11	Relay	1 kW	Basco, Batanes
D-12-ZT	ABS-CBN Olongapo	12	Relay	1 kW	Upper Mabayuan, Olongapo
D-13-ZA	ABS-CBN Botolan	13	Relay	0.1 kW	Brgy. Binuclutan, Botolan, Zambales
DZAD	ABS-CBN Batangas	10	Originating	5 kW	Mt. Banoy, Batangas City
DZAB	ABS-CBN Occidental Mindoro	11	Relay	1 kW	A. Mabini St., San Jose, Occidental Mindoro
DYPR	ABS-CBN Palawan	7	Originating/Affiliate	10 kW	Mabini cor. Valencia St., Brgy. Masipag, Puerto Princesa
—N/a	ABS-CBN Española	10	Relay	0.1 kW	Sofronio Española, Palawan
DZNC	ABS-CBN Naga	11	Originating	10 kW	Panganiban Dr., Naga, Camarines Sur
DZAE	ABS-CBN Legazpi	4	Relay	10 kW	Mt. Bariw, Brgy. Estanza, Legazpi, Albay
D-10-ZC	ABS-CBN Tabaco	10	Relay	0.025 kW	Ziga Ave., Tabaco, Albay
DZAC	ABS-CBN Catanduanes	7	Relay	1 kW (1.41 kW ERP)	San Isidro Village, Brgy. San Jose, Virac, Catanduanes
DWAW	ABS-CBN Sorsogon	7	Relay	0.1 kW (0.162 kW ERP)	Sorsogon City
DYME	ABS-CBN Masbate	10	Affiliate	1 kW	MCBC Broadcast Complex, Zurbito St., Masbate City
DYEZ	ABS-CBN Kalibo	9	Relay	1 kW	C. Laserna St., Poblacion, Kalibo, Aklan
DYAF	ABS-CBN Iloilo	10	Originating	5 kW	Brgy. Alaguisoc, Jordan, Guimaras****
DYXL	ABS-CBN Bacolod	4	Originating	10 kW	Mt. Canlandog, Murcia, Negros Occidental
DYCB	ABS-CBN Cebu	3	Originating	50 kW	Mt. Busay Hills, Brgy. Babag, Cebu City
D-9-YA	ABS-CBN Bohol	9	Relay	0.1 kW	Mt. Laca, Jagna, Bohol
DYMA	ABS-CBN Dumaguete	12	Relay	0.1 kW	Brgy. Palinpinon, Valencia, Negros Oriental
DYAB	ABS-CBN Tacloban	2	Originating	5 kW	Mt. Naga-Naga, Brgy. 110 Utap, Tacloban
DYDI	ABS-CBN Calbayog	10	Affiliate	0.1 kW	Pajarito St., Brgy. Aguit-itan, Calbayog, Samar
DXLL	ABS-CBN Zamboanga	3	Originating	1 kW	San Jose Road, Zamboanga City
D-2-XB	ABS-CBN Bukidnon	2	Originating	10 kW	Mt. Kitanglad, Bukidnon
DXAG	ABS-CBN Iligan	4	Relay	1 kW	Elena Tower, Andres Bonafacio Ave., Brgy. Tibanga, Iligan
DXAS	ABS-CBN Davao	4	Originating	40 kW	Shrine Hills, Matina, Davao City
DXZT	ABS-CBN General Santos	3	Originating	5 kW	Villegas Subdivision, Brgy. San Isidro, General Santos
DXAJ	ABS-CBN Butuan	11	Relay	1 kW	BayanTel Bldg., Marcos Calo St., Butuan
DXSJ	ABS-CBN Surigao	12	Affiliate	1 kW	SJTIT Compound, Brgy. Taft, Surigao City, Surigao del Norte
DXAI	ABS-CBN Cotabato	5	Relay	1 kW	Brgy. Rosary Heights V, Cotabato City
DXMM	ABS-CBN Jolo	10	Affiliate	0.1 kW	Brgy. Gandasuli, Patikul, Sulu

===== UHF =====
Callsign	Branding	Ch. #	Station Type	Power	Location (Transmitter Site)
DZRR	ABS-CBN Dagupan (Note: On October 1, 2023, the channel's frequency is assigned to ZOE Broadcasting Network, currently under blocktime agreement with ABS-CBN.)	32	Relay	20 kW	Mt. Santo Tomas, Tuba, Benguet
DWBK	ABS-CBN Vigan	34	Relay	1 kW	Mt. Caniao, Bantay, Ilocos Sur
DWAD	ABS-CBN Bayombong	34	Relay	1 kW	Bgy. Magsaysay, Bayombong, Nueva Vizcaya
DZBA	ABS-CBN Baler	22	Relay	1 kW	Quezon St., cor. Patabangan-Baler Rd., Baler, Aurora****
DWBY	ABS-CBN Bulacan	34	Relay	0.1 kW	Cagayan Valley Rd., Brgy. Vicente, San Miguel, Bulacan
DWTC	ABS-CBN Tarlac	34	Relay	1 kW	MacArthur Highway, St. Cristo, Tarlac City
DWIN	ABS-CBN Pampanga (Note: Ran from July 2018 as a North Luzon sub-opt, with separate breakfast shows and local advertising; downgraded to a Baguio semi-satellite station from November 3, 2018 until final sign-off.)	46	Relay	5 kW	Brgy. Lara, San Fernando, Pampanga
DWEW	ABS-CBN Lucena	24	Relay	1 kW	Maharlika Hi-way, Brgy. Mayao Kanluran, Lucena****
DWAR	ABS-CBN Jalajala	40	Relay	3 kW	Mt. Landing, Jalajala, Rizal
DWLY	ABS-CBN San Pablo	46	Relay	1 kW	Brgy. San Jose, San Pablo, Laguna
DWRC	ABS-CBN Daet	23	Relay	1 kW (21.09 kW ERP)	LJR Bldg. 2, Gov. Panotes Ave, Daet, Camarines Norte****
DYRC	ABS-CBN Roxas	21	Relay	0.1 kW	Brgy. Milibili, Roxas City, Capiz****
DYMG	ABS-CBN Dipolog	42	Relay	1 kW	Dipolog-Zamboanga Hi-way, Dipolog, Zamboanga del Norte****
DXEC	ABS-CBN Cagayan De Oro	23	Relay	10 kW (367.35 kW ERP)	Macapagal Dr., Brgy. Bulua, Cagayan de Oro****
DXAR	ABS-CBN Koronadal	24	Relay	1 kW	Green Valley Bldg, Marbel Roundball, Koronadal, South Cotabato****

==== Former analog broadcast stations (broadcast ceased pre-C&D) ====
- Fully shut off its analog signal or migrated to digital before May 5, 2020.

Callsign	Branding	Ch. #	Station Type	Power	Location (Transmitter Site)
DYAT	ABS-CBN Bacolod	40	Relay	10 kW	26th Lacson St., Bacolod
DYSB	ABS-CBN Catarman	7	Affiliate	1 kW	Catarman, Northern Samar
DXLM	ABS-CBN Pagadian	9	Affiliate	0.1 kW	Mount Palpalan, Pagadian
DXMT	ABS-CBN Ozamiz	7	Affiliate	0.1 kW	Don Anslemo Bernad Ave. cor. Animas St., Ozamiz

==== Former digital broadcast stations ====
Callsign	Branding	Ch. #	Frequency	Power	Transmitter location
DWWX	ABS-CBN Manila	16	485.143 MHz	5 kW	Quezon City
DWWX	ABS-CBN Manila	16	485.143 MHz	5 kW	Summit One Tower, Mandaluyong (Note: Single frequency network relay station)
DWWX	ABS-CBN Manila	16	485.143 MHz	5 kW	Guiguinto, Bulacan
DWWX	ABS-CBN Manila	16	485.143 MHz	5 kW	Silang, Cavite
DWWX	ABS-CBN Manila	16	485.143 MHz	5 kW	Jalajala, Rizal
DWBM (Note: Frequency assigned to Swara Sug Media Corporation on January 5, 2022 until it shut down on December 21, 2023 due to NTC's 30-day suspension order.)	ABS-CBN Manila	43****	647.143 MHz	5 kW	Quezon City
D-3-ZO	ABS-CBN Baguio	30****	569.143 MHz	10 kW	Tuba, Benguet
DWTC	ABS-CBN Tarlac	34	593.143 MHz	5 kW	Tarlac City
DWIN	ABS-CBN Pampanga	34	593.143 MHz	5 kW	San Fernando, Pampanga
DZAD	ABS-CBN Batangas	40	629.143 MHz	10 kW	Batangas City
DWLY	ABS-CBN San Pablo	38	617.143 MHz	5 kW	San Pablo, Laguna
DYAF	ABS-CBN Iloilo	25	539.143 MHz	10 kW	Jordan, Guimaras
DYXL	ABS-CBN Bacolod	22****	521.143 MHz	10 kW	Bacolod
DYCB	ABS-CBN Cebu	36	605.143 MHz	10 kW	Cebu City
DYCB	ABS-CBN Cebu	37	611.143 MHz	10 kW	Cebu City
DXEC	ABS-CBN Cagayan de Oro	22	521.143 MHz	5 kW	Cagayan de Oro
DXEC	ABS-CBN Cagayan de Oro	40	629.143 MHz	5 kW	Cagayan de Oro
DXAS	ABS-CBN Davao	35	599.143 MHz	5 kW	Davao City

=== S+A (defunct) ===
==== Former analog broadcast stations ====
Callsign	Branding	Ch. #	Station Type	Power	Location (Transmitter Site)
DWAC	S+A Manila (Note: On January 5, 2022, the channel's frequency is assigned to Aliw Broadcasting Corporation.)	23	Originating	50 kW	Quezon City**
DWEC	S+A Baguio	30	Relay	10 kW	Mt. Santo Tomas, Tuba, Benguet****
DWLC	S+A Laoag	23	Relay	1 kW	San Nicolas, Ilocos Norte****
DWWA	S+A Isabela	23	Relay	0.1 kW	Santiago, Isabela****
DWAS	S+A Olongapo	24	Relay	1 kW	Olongapo****
DWAM	S+A Botolan	23	Relay	0.1 kW	Botolan, Zambales****
DWJR	S+A Batangas (Note: On January 13, 2025, the channel's frequency is assigned to Sphere Entertainment, Inc. (formerly Benguet Broadcasting Corporation) and Broadcast Enterprises and Affiliated Media Inc. currently under sub-channel rental agreement with ABS-CBN.)	36	Relay	1 kW	Mt. Banoy, Batangas City****
DZEL	S+A Palawan	23	Relay	1 kW	Puerto Princesa****
DWMC	S+A Naga	24	Relay	10 kW (215.05 kW ERP)	Naga, Camarines Sur****
DWBR	S+A Legazpi	23	Relay	1 kW	Legazpi, Albay***
DYCG	S+A Kalibo	23	Relay	1 kW	Kalibo, Aklan****
DYAJ	S+A Iloilo	38	Relay	10 kW (229.11 kW ERP)	Iloilo City**
DYEC	S+A Bacolod	22	Relay	10 kW (360.34 kW ERP)	Bacolod****
DYAC	S+A Cebu	23	Relay	10 kW (138.70 kW ERP)	Cebu City****
DYAD	S+A Bohol	40	Relay	0.1 kW (0.983 kW ERP)	Jagna, Bohol****
DYEL	S+A Dumaguete	24	Relay	1 kW	Valencia, Negros Oriental****
—N/a	S+A Tacloban	24	Relay	1 kW	Tacloban***
DXFH	S+A Zamboanga	23	Relay	10 kW	Zamboanga City****
DXAM	S+A Iligan	26	Relay	0.5 kW	Iligan****
DXCS	S+A Cagayan de Oro	4	Relay	10 kW	Cagayan de Oro**
DXAB	S+A Davao	21	Relay	10 kW (188.16 kW ERP)	Davao City****
DXAC	S+A General Santos	36	Relay	10 kW	General Santos****
DXAY	S+A Cotabato	23	Relay	1 kW	Cotabato City***
DXBR	S+A Butuan	22	Relay	1 kW	Butuan****
—N/a	S+A Surigao	23	Relay	1 kW	Surigao City, Surigao del Norte***

- * Co-located with former VHF TV stations; ** Formerly owned by ABS-CBN; *** With now-cancelled/rejected application with the NTC; **** Formerly owned by AMCARA.

== Pay television channels ==
=== Domestic ===
- Kapamilya Channel (Note: Current flagship network.)
- ABS-CBN News Channel
- Cinema One (Note: Operated by Creative Programs.)
- DZMM TeleRadyo
- Jeepney TV
- Knowledge Channel
- Cine Mo!
- Metro Channel
- Myx
- O Shopping (Note: Defunct.)

=== International ===
- CineMo! Global
- ANC Global
- Cinema One International
- Myx TV (North America)
- The Filipino Channel

== Former AM/FM radio stations ==
Radyo Patrol
- Type: Broadcast AM Radio Network
- Branding: Radyo Patrol
- Country: Philippines
- Availability: Defunct
- Founded: July 22, 1986; 40 years ago
- Motto: Una sa Balita, Una sa Public Service (transl. First in News, First in Public Service)
- Owner: ABS-CBN Corporation
- Launch date: July 22, 1986; 40 years ago
- Dissolved: May 5, 2020; 6 years ago (broadcast franchise lapsed/expired)

=== Radyo Patrol (defunct) ===
Callsign	Branding	Frequency	Power	Location
DZMM	DZMM Radyo Patrol 630 (Note: Frequency used by DWPM since 2023 but still using the branding since 2025.)	630 kHz	50 kW	Metro Manila
DYAP	DYAP Radyo Patrol 765 Palawan	765 kHz	5 kW	Puerto Princesa City, Palawan
DYAB	DYAB Radyo Patrol 1512 Cebu	1512 kHz	10 kW	Pardo, Cebu City
DXAB	DXAB Radyo Patrol 1296 Davao	1296 kHz	10 kW	Matina, Davao City

=== My Only Radio (defunct) ===
My Only Radio
- Type: Broadcast FM Radio Network
- Branding: My Only Radio
- Country: Philippines
- Availability: Defunct
- Founded: July 16, 1989; 37 years ago
- Motto: (varies per station location); For Life! (primary)
- Owner: ABS-CBN Corporation
- Launch date: July 16, 1989; 37 years ago
- Dissolved: May 5, 2020; 6 years ago (broadcast franchise lapsed/expired)

Callsign	Branding	Frequency	Power	Location
DWRR	MOR 101.9 My Only Radio Manila (Note: Frequency used by Anchor Radio 101.9 in San Pedro, Laguna from 2023 to around 2024.)	101.9 MHz	22.5 kW	Lopez Center, Antipolo City
DZRR	MOR 103.1 My Only Radio Baguio	103.1 MHz	5 kW	Mt. Sto. Tomas, Benguet
DWEL	MOR 95.5 My Only Radio Laoag	95.5 MHz	5 kW	San Nicolas, Ilocos Norte
DWEC	MOR 94.3 My Only Radio Dagupan (Note: Now FMR Favorite Music Radio Baguio since 2021.)	94.3 MHz	10 kW	Dagupan City
PA	MOR 91.3 My Only Radio Isabela (Note: Relay from MOR 103.1 For Life! Baguio.)	91.3 MHz	5 kW	Santiago, Isabela
DYCU	MOR 99.9 My Only Radio Puerto Princesa	99.9 MHz	5 kW	Puerto Princesa City
PA	MOR 99.7 My Only Radio For Life! Española (Note: Now Radyo Bandera since 2021.)	99.7 MHz	5 kW	Española, Palawan
DWAC	MOR 93.5 My Only Radio Naga	93.5 MHz	10 kW	Naga City
DWRD	MOR 93.9 My Only Radio Legazpi	93.9 MHz	5 kW	Mt. Bariw, Legazpi City
DYMC	MOR 91.1 My Only Radio Iloilo (Note: Now FMR Favorite Music Radio Bacolod since 2021.)	91.1 MHz	10 kW	Iloilo City
DYOO	MOR 101.5 My Only Radio Bacolod (Note: Now K5 News FM Bacolod since 2025.)	101.5 MHz	10 kW	Bacolod
DYLS	MOR 97.1 My Only Radio Cebu	97.1 MHz	20 kW	Mt. Busay, Cebu City
DYTC	MOR 94.3 My Only Radio Tacloban	94.3 MHz	10 kW	Tacloban City
DYCT	MOR 95.7 My Only Radio Catarman	95.7 MHz	10 kW	Catarman, Northern Samar
DXFH	MOR 98.7 My Only Radio Zamboanga	98.7 MHz	10 kW	Zamboanga City
DXEC	MOR 91.9 My Only Radio Cagayan de Oro (Note: Now Marian Radio CDO since 2024.)	91.9 MHz	10 kW	Bulua, Cagayan de Oro City
DXRR	MOR 101.1 My Only Radio Davao (Note: Frequency used by Anchor Radio Davao from 2023 to 2025.)	101.1 MHz	10 kW	Shrine Hill, Matina, Davao City
DXBC	MOR 92.7 My Only Radio General Santos	92.7 MHz	2 kW	Lagao, General Santos City
DXPS	MOR 95.1 My Only Radio Cotabato	95.1 MHz	10 kW	Cotabato City

== See also ==
- ABS-CBN
- A2Z (TV channel)
- ZOE Broadcasting Network § Stations
- All TV
- Advanced Media Broadcasting System § Stations
- Philippine Collective Media Corporation
- Philippine Collective Media Corporation § Stations
