= DYAC-TV =

Defunct TV station in Cebu, Philippines

- Metro Cebu; Philippines
- City: Cebu City
- Channels: Analog: 23 (UHF); Digital: 37 (UHF) (ISDB-T)

Programming
- Affiliations: Silent

Ownership
- Owner: ABS-CBN Corporation; (AMCARA Broadcasting Network)
- Sister stations: DYCB-TV; DYAB-AM; DYLS-FM

History
- Founded: 1992
- Last air date: May 5, 2020 (broadcast franchise lapsed/expired)
- Former call signs: DYEE-TV (1992-1996)
- Former affiliations: Independent (1992-1996); EEC-23 (1992-1996); MTV Asia (1992-1994, 1996-2000); Channel V (1994-1996); Myx (2000-2014); Studio 23 (1996-2014)
- Call sign meaning: DY; Arcadio Carandang

Technical information
- Licensing authority: NTC

DYAC-TV (channel 23) was the regional relay station of DWAC-TV, a fully owned subsidiary of AMCARA Broadcasting Network. Its transmitter and broadcast facilities were located at Mt. Busay, Brgy. Babag 1, Cebu City.

On May 5, 2020, the station, alongside ABS-CBN Sports and Action flagship station DWAC, its radio counterpart DZMM, MOR station DWRR and all other television and radio stations ceased broadcasting nationwide due to the cease and desist order from the National Telecommunications Commission, after its legislative franchise to operate this expired the day before. On September 10, 2020, exactly two months after ABS-CBN's new franchise was denied by Congress at a 70-11 vote, NTC recalled all television and radio frequencies issued to ABS-CBN.

== Digital television ==
=== Digital channels ===
UHF Channel 37 (611.143 MHz)

Channel	Video	Aspect	Short name	Programming	Note
11.16	480i	4:3	ABS-CBN CEBU	ABS-CBN Cebu	Commercial broadcast
11.17	480i	4:3	SPORTS+ACTION	S+A	Commercial broadcast
11.18	480i	4:3	CINEMO!	Cine Mo!	Encrypted
11.21	480i	4:3	YEY!	Yey!	Encrypted
11.22	480i	4:3	DZMM TeleRadyo	DZMM TeleRadyo	Encrypted
11.23	480i	4:3	KBO Channel	Kapamilya Box Office	Pay per view
11.24	240p	4:3	ABS-CBN OneSeg	ABS-CBN OneSeg	1seg

UHF Channel 36 (605.143 MHz)

Channel	Video	Aspect	Short name	Programming	Note
2.01	480i	16:9	Knowledge Channel	Knowledge Channel	Test broadcast
2.02	480i	16:9	O SHOPPING	O Shopping	Test broadcast
2.03	480i	16:9	ASIANOVELA CHANNEL	Asianovela Channel	Encrypted (on free trial) ^{2}
2.04	480i	16:9	MOVIE CENTRAL	Movie Central	Encrypted (on free trial) ^{2}
2.05	480i	16:9	JEEPNEY TV	Jeepney TV	Encrypted (on free trial) ^{2}
2.06	480i	16:9	MYX	Myx	Encrypted (on free trial) ^{2}
2.31	240p	4:3	ASIANOVELA ONESEG	Asianovela Channel OneSeg	1seg

Note:

- CINEMO!, YEY!, Knowledge Channel, DZMM TeleRadyo and KBO Channel were exclusive channels to TV Plus, a digital set-top box manufactured by the network.

== See also ==
- ABS-CBN
- ABS-CBN Sports and Action
- DYCB-TV
- MOR 97.1
- DYAB
- Studio 23 (the former name of ABS-CBN Sports and Action)
- ABS-CBN Sports and Action stations
