= DXFH-TV =

DXFH-TV (S+A Zamboanga)
- Zamboanga City; Philippines
- City: Zamboanga City
- Channels: Analog: 23 (UHF)
- Branding: S+A Zamboanga

Programming
- Affiliations: S+A

Ownership
- Owner: ABS-CBN Corporation; (AMCARA Broadcasting Network)
- Sister stations: DXLL-TV (ABS-CBN); DXFH-FM (MOR 98.7 Zamboanga Nah Ese Vale!)

History
- Founded: 1996
- Last air date: May 5, 2020 (broadcast franchise lapsed/expired)
- Former affiliations: Studio 23 (1996-2014)

Technical information
- ERP: 10 kW (215.05 kW ERP)

Links
- Website: S+A Website

DXFH-TV, channel 23, was the flagship station of Philippine television network ABS-CBN Sports and Action (S+A), a fully owned subsidiary of AMCARA Broadcasting Network. The station's studios and transmitter are located at the ABS-CBN Broadcast Center, San Jose Road, Zamboanga City.

On May 5, 2020, S+A Zambaoanga went off-air, alongside ABS-CBN and MOR, due to cease-and-desist order from the National Telecommunications Commission after its legislative franchise expired the previous day.

== See also ==
- S+A stations
- DXFH-FM
- DXLL-TV
