= DYTC =

DYTC may refer to the following stations in Visayas, Philippines:

- A call sign used by ABS-CBN Corporation in Tacloban
  - DYTC-TV, a television station broadcasting as ABS-CBN S+A Tacloban
  - DYTC-FM, an FM radio station broadcasting as MOR Tacloban
