= ABS-CBN (disambiguation) =

ABS-CBN is one of the largest television networks in the Philippines.

ABS-CBN may also refer to:

- ABS-CBN Corporation, the parent company of the television network
  - List of ABS-CBN Corporation subsidiaries, subsidiaries of ABS-CBN Corporation which may or have had carried "ABS-CBN" as part of their names
  - List of real estate properties owned by ABS-CBN, real estate which may or have had carried "ABS-CBN" as part of their names
  - List of ABS-CBN Corporation channels and stations, television channels which carry "ABS-CBN" as part of their branding names
