= DYLS =

DYLS is the callsign of two stations in Cebu City, Philippines:

- DYLS-FM, branded as MOR 97.1 Lupig Sila! (now defunct)
- DYLS-TV, branded as GTV 27 Cebu
