= DYAC =

DYAC is the callsign of two stations in Cebu City, Philippines:

- DYAC-FM, an FM radio station broadcasting as Brigada News FM
- DYAC-TV, a defunct TV station formerly broadcasting as S+A

== See also ==
- DIAC
