= DYLS-FM =

Defunct radio station in Cebu City, Philippines

DYLS
- Mandaue–Cebu City; Philippines
- Broadcast area: Metro Cebu and surrounding areas
- Frequency: 97.1 MHz

Programming
- Format: Silent

Ownership
- Owner: AMCARA Broadcasting Network (1992–1996); ABS-CBN Corporation (1996–2020)
- Sister stations: DYAB-AM, DYCB-TV, DYAC-TV

History
- First air date: January 20, 1992; 34 years ago
- Last air date: May 5, 2020; 6 years ago (broadcast franchise lapsed/expired)
- Former names: LS 97 The Great Romance (1992-1996); Star Radio (1996-1997); ABS-CBN Radio/LS 97.1 (1997-2001); My Only Radio (2001-2020)
- Call sign meaning: Lupig Sila!

Technical information
- Licensing authority: NTC

MOR 97.1 Cebu Final logo 2018 to 2020.

DYLS (97.1 FM) was a radio station formerly owned and operated by ABS-CBN Corporation. The station's studio and offices were located at the ABS-CBN Broadcasting Complex, North Road, Jagobiao, Mandaue, while its transmitter was located at Babag 2, Brgy. Busay, Cebu City.

== History ==
=== 1992-1996: LS 97 The Great Romance ===
Established on January 20, 1992, DYLS was the first radio station opened by AMCARA Broadcasting Network under the brand LS 97 The Great Romance. Prior to this, it was under the ownership of Republic Broadcasting System (now GMA Network), which first went on air from 1978 to 1979. It featuring an easy listening format, similar to the Manila-based station 101.9 Radio Romance. Operations were then-located at the ABS-CBN Complex in P. del Rosario cor. Leon Kilat Sts., Cebu City.

=== 1996-1997: Star Radio ===
In July 1996, ABS-CBN acquired the station from AMCARA, and reformatted it as ABS-CBN Star Radio 97.1, adopting the slogan "The Heart of the City" with a mass-based format. Initially broadcast entirely in English spiels, the station was manned by Jeff Sinajon (Dr. Jeff), who is currently part of 102.3 Kiss FM Bohol. By the end of the year, ABS-CBN Star Radio began adopting a mix of English and Cebuano languages.

=== 1997-2001: ABS-CBN Radio/LS 97.1 ===
On March 1, 1997, following the creation of the Regional Network Group (RNG), the station was rebranded as ABS-CBN Radio LS97. This change helped to avoid confusion with its rival network Star FM, owned by Bombo Radyo Philippines. The station's taglines were "Lupig Sila!" and "For Life!", which was later borrowed by the Manila station a year later. A few months later, a RRC-PSRC Survey shows 97.1 spotted the market so that they can make it to top 1 in the city. On March 12, 1998, the station relocated its studio and offices to the newly complex in North Road, Jagobiao, Mandaue, integrated it with the existing ABS-CBN Cebu facilities.

On February 8, 1999, the station dropped the "Radio" from the brand and transition it as LS 97.1 Lupig Sila! under the ABS-CBN For Life! banner with the on-screen as LS 97.1.

=== 2001-2020: MOR 97.1 ===
On July 14, 2001, as part of rebranding ABS-CBN's RNG FM stations coinciding with the Cagayan de Oro station's 8th Anniversary, DYLS was rebranded as MOR 97.1 Lupig Sila! For Life!. According to Nielsen and Kantar Media Survey, MOR Cebu quickly became as the Number 1 FM radio station in Metro Cebu for the last quarter of 2011.

On July 30, 2016, the station celebrated its 20th anniversary with a tagline, "#20MakaHAPPY". Following that, MOR 97.1 Cebu is considered to being the Official Number 1 Radio station in Metro Cebu in the accordance of Kantar Media Surveys with the audience share of 27.20% during the 1st Quarter of FY 2016.

On June 1, 2017, TV Patrol Central Visayas, ABS-CBN Cebu's longest-running regional newscast, has been simulcasting on the station alongside sister station DYAB Radyo Patrol; thus becoming the first regional MOR station to do such.

In June 2018, the station further rebranded as MOR Philippines and adopting the new tagline "One Vibe, One Sound", with the relaunch began on August 11. The rebranding aimed to unify Manila and other provincial outlets with consistent program brands and music selections. Its new programmings also included Dyis Is It and MOR Presents with David Bang.

On June 1, 2019, MOR Cebu, along with other MOR stations in Manila and Baguio, expanding its video streaming platforms, which was available on Sky Cable Channel 240.

==== Shutdown ====
On May 5, 2020, the station ceased operations, along with the other My Only Radio outlets, as well as sister stations ABS-CBN, S+A and Radyo Patrol. The closure was result of the cease and desist order of the National Telecommunications Commission, mandating the network's suspension due to its legislative franchise to operate expired the day before.

On September 14, 2020, My Only Radio began its online presence in the Visayas region as part of the broader relaunched of MOR Philippines as a digital broadcast platforms; hence rebranded the service as MOR Entertainment Visayas on February 14, 2021, with programming continues to stream content on Facebook and YouTube.
