= DWRR-FM =

Defunct radio station in Metro Manila, Philippines

Coordinates: 14°38′22.9″N 121°02′13.1″E

DWRR
- Quezon City; Philippines
- Broadcast area: Mega Manila and surrounding areas
- Frequency: 101.9 MHz

Programming
- Format: Silent

Ownership
- Owner: ABS-CBN Corporation (1956–1972, 1986–2020); Banahaw Broadcasting Corporation (1973–1986)
- Sister stations: DZMM Radyo Patrol 630 (now owned by PCMC under DWPM); DWWX-TV; DWAC-TV

History
- First air date: 1956
- Last air date: May 5, 2020 (broadcast franchise lapsed/expired)
- Former call signs: DZYL-FM (1956–1960); DZYK (1960–1972); DWWK (1973–1984); DWOK (1984–1986); DWKO (1986–1987); DZOO (1987–1989)
- Former names: DZYL-FM/DZYK-FM (1956-1972); OK 101 (1973-1986); Knock Out Radio (1986-1987); Zoo FM (1987-1989); Radio Romance (1989-1996); WRR 101.9 (1996-2009); Tambayan (2009-2013); My Only Radio (2013-2020)
- Former frequencies: 102.1 MHz (1956–1968)
- Call sign meaning: Radio Romance (former branding)

Technical information
- Licensing authority: NTC

DWRR-FM (101.9 FM) was a commercial radio station formerly owned by ABS-CBN Corporation and previously operated by the Manila Radio division and the Star Creatives Group. The studios were located at ABS-CBN Broadcasting Center, Sgt. Esguerra Ave., corner Mo. Ignacia Ave., Diliman, Quezon City, and the station's transmitter was located at the Eugenio Lopez Center, Santa Cruz, Sumulong Highway, Antipolo City, Rizal Province.

DWRR was founded in 1956 as one of the radio stations of Chronicle Broadcasting Network (now ABS-CBN). It was revived in 1986 and reformatted several times. On May 5, 2020, it terminated its broadcasting activities, together with that of its television and sister radio stations, following a cease-and-desist order issued by the National Telecommunications Commission due to the expiration of ABS-CBN's legislative franchise to operate. The online radio permanently ceased operations on August 28, 2020, as a result of a franchise denial made by the House of Representatives on July 10, 2020.

== History ==
=== DZYL-FM/DZYK-FM (1956-1972) ===
DZYL-FM 102 MHz, later renamed DZYK-FM 102.1 MHz, was the first FM radio station in the Philippines and the sole FM outlet of the former Chronicle Broadcasting Network (CBN). Established in 1956, it featured the latest music of the time and was staffed by eight DJs who helped popularize the station in the Greater Manila area. In 1957, CBN acquired Alto Broadcasting System (ABS), leading to a merger under Bolinao Electronics Corporation, which was renamed ABS-CBN Broadcasting Corporation in 1967. In 1968, DZYK-FM shifted to 101.9 MHz.

=== DWWK-FM/OK 101 (1973-1986) ===
DZYK-FM remained ABS-CBN's FM radio station until 1972, when President Ferdinand E. Marcos, Sr. declared martial law and ordered the shutdown of all ABS-CBN stations, including two TV channels and six AM radio stations in Manila, under censorship. In 1973, the FM station was taken over by Banahaw Broadcasting Corporation and rebranded as DWWK-FM. From 1979 to 1984, DWWK-FM gained recognition for its jazz format and was staffed by notable personalities such as Jing Magsaysay, Wayne Enage, Ed Picson, Dody Lacuna, Ronnie Malig, Pinky Villarama, and Ronnie Quintos. In 1984, it was rebranded as DWOK-FM, the first FM station to adopt an AM-style format, featuring news, public service programs, and nostalgic music. Renowned broadcaster Helen Vela also joined DWOK with her counseling program Lovingly Yours, Helen.

=== Knock Out Radio (1986-1987) ===
During the 1986 People Power Revolution, reformist rebels stormed government-controlled radio and TV stations, leading to the dissolution of DWOK, DWAN (formerly DWWA), and BBC-2. Following the fall of the Marcos regime, the newly formed Presidential Commission on Good Governance returned DWOK and DWWW (630 kHz under Radio Philippines Network) to ABS-CBN in July. DWOK changed its callsign to DWKO and resumed test broadcasts on July 16, led by Lito Balquiedra Jr., Vice-President for Radio, who spearheaded the network's return to local airwaves. Former disc jockey Peter Musñgi-then known as Peter Rabbit-became the network's voice-over artist and introduced the station's new slogan, “Panalo Ka Talaga!” Sister station DZMM 630 launched its broadcasts the following week.

The network began recruiting both seasoned professionals and new talent as it prepared for a full relaunch. On September 14, 1986, following its test broadcast phase, DWKO-FM was officially relaunched as Knock-Out Radio 101.9, the first FM station in the country to adopt an AM-style format. Operating daily from 5:00 a.m. to 2:00 a.m., the station featured the latest Pinoy hits by artists such as Rico J. Puno, Yoyoy Villame, and APO Hiking Society, along with rising OPM stars like Gary Valenciano, Regine Velasquez, Janno Gibbs, and Donna Cruz. It also played classic Filipino Christmas songs. On the same day, ABS-CBN Channel 2 resumed television broadcasts. At the time, ABS-CBN's stations were collectively branded as the Star Network.

DWKO-FM ended its broadcasts on February 28, 1987, marking one of the station's shortest-lived iterations, lasting just under five months.

=== Zoo FM (1987-1989) ===
The following day, on March 1, 1987, the station rebranded as Zoo FM 101.9 (DZOO-FM, read as D-Z-double O-FM), adopting a new diamond logo and a slightly upbeat pop sound. The station's jingles were produced by JAM Creative Productions, and its slogan became “Hayop Talaga!” It was staffed by a team of eight DJs, including George Boone, Jeremiah Jr., Bob Curry, Bill O'Brien, Andy Santillan (aka Dave Ryan, later known as “The Unbeatable”), and Joe Monkey. Zoo FM played a mix of disco, top 40 hits, and OPM favorites from artists like Gary V, Randy Santiago, Regine Velasquez, Ogie Alcasid, and Sharon Cuneta, especially following the implementation of Executive Order No. 255 by President Corazon Aquino.

Zoo FM's competitors included The Giant 97.1 WLS-FM (now Barangay LS 97.1), 99.5 RT (now 99.5 Play FM, later XFM), Magic 89.9, 89 DMZ (now Wave 89.1, later Adventist World Radio), and NU 107 (now Wish 1075). Despite ABS-CBN's resurgence, which had made it the dominant TV network by 1988, WLS-FM's ratings success ultimately led to the end of the Zoo FM format. At midnight on July 15, 1989, the station signed off for the final time, playing "Farewell" by Raymond Lauchengco in 1983.

=== Radio Romance (1989-1996) ===
At 6:00 a.m. on July 16, 1989, the station was rebranded as 101.9 Radio Romance (RR), focusing on easy-listening love songs, with the exception of a Sunday OPM program. Initially staffed entirely by female DJs, including Amy Perez, it became the first FM station to use compact discs for originating playlists, marking a significant technological leap. That same year, the station achieved its first nationwide reach when 103.1 MHz in Baguio began simulcasting its signal, offering uninterrupted coverage for travelers from Manila to as far north as Ilocos Sur. By the early 1990s, Radio Romance expanded its reach nationwide via satellite. The station's theme song, also titled Radio Romance, was composed by Jose Mari Chan and later inspired a movie.

The station signed off for the last time in September 1996.

=== WRR 101.9 (1996-2009) ===
In September 1996, DWRR relaunched as WRR 101.9, a mainstream pop station, and became the first FM station to broadcast entirely in Filipino to compete with English-language rivals such as GMA Network's Campus Radio 97.1 WLS, Magic 89.9 and 99.5 RT. Prior to this, all FM stations were English-based. By the end of the year, all ABS-CBN FM stations had switched to native languages. WRR 101.9's initial slogan was All the Hits, All the Time! On November 2, 1998, it adopted the tagline For Life! (borrowed from its Cebu counterpart), emphasizing the station's role in enhancing listeners’ daily lives.

In late 1999, the station moved its transmitting equipment from the ABS-CBN Broadcast Center to a new tower at the Eugenio Lopez Center in Antipolo, in line with the upgrade of the Millennium Transmitter.

In July 2005, the WRR brand was dropped and the station introduced the slogan Alam Mo Na 'Yan! (You Already Know It!). This was later replaced by Bespren! (Best friend!) in November 2008.

On September 19, 2009, the station aired its final broadcast under the 101.9 For Life! brand before transitioning to automated music for a planned rebrand on October 1, 2009. However, due to Typhoon Ondoy (Ketsana), the relaunch was delayed by a month. During this time, the station temporarily went by ABS-CBN 101.9 FM or simply 101.9 and resumed live DJ spiels without any branding or slogans.

=== Tambayan (2009-2013) ===
Former logo of Tambayan 101.9, November 4, 2009 – May 2013

Logos used by Tambayan TV when the station was named as 101.9 in 2013

At 9:00 PM on November 4, 2009, an audiovisual presentation on DWRR's history was followed by the station's relaunch as Tambayan 101.9 (Tagalog for “hangout”). The rebrand debuted with a theme song and live event in Makati. The station also launched Tambayan TV, a 24/7 online video stream showing DJs live in the booth, along with information plugs like Tambayan's Slumbook and filler content during ad breaks, similar to DZMM Teleradyo.

The station was simultaneously launched on HD Radio.

In mid-May 2013, the Tambayan brand was dropped, reverting briefly to 101.9 as part of another transition phase.

=== MOR For Life! (2013–2020) ===
Former logo of MOR 101.9, January 1, 2014 – 2017

Former logo of MOR 101.9, June 2018 – May 5, 2020

At midnight on July 8, 2013, 101.9 FM rebranded as MOR 101.9 My Only Radio For Life!. Regular programming began at 5:00 AM with DJs Joco Loco, Maki Rena, and Eva Ronda. Returning were DJs from both WRR 101.9 (Toni, China Heart, Reggie Valdez, Martin D., Geri) and Tambayan 101.9 (Charlie, Jasmin, Popoy, Bea, Chacha, Onse). The rebrand unified ABS-CBN's FM stations nationwide under the MOR brand and revived the “For Life” slogan. It also introduced Dear MOR, a daily FM drama anthology (formerly Dear Jasmin).

In June 2018, MOR Manila and its regional stations rebranded again as MOR Philippines, adopting the tagline “One Vibe, One Sound” to unify programs and music across the network. National shows like Dyis Is It and MOR Presents with David Bang launched on August 11, 2018.

On June 1, 2019, MOR 101.9's video streaming moved to Sky Cable Channel 239 (former slot of Sony Channel Asia), also airing on Channels 240 (Cebu) and 241 (Baguio).

In March 2020, due to COVID-19 lockdowns, MOR scaled down its programming and began simulcasting with its sister AM station, DZMM Radyo Patrol 630.

==== Shutdown ====
On May 5, 2020, MOR Philippines signed off, alongside sister stations ABS-CBN, S+A, and DZMM, following a cease-and-desist order from the National Telecommunications Commission. The order mandated the network's suspension after its legislative franchise expiration. DJ Jhai Ho delivered a farewell message, with Yeng Constantino''s "Salamat" as the final song, followed by the station's ID before the final sign-off.

After the House of Representatives denied ABS-CBN a new franchise on July 10, 2020, the network announced mass layoffs set for August 31. However, on the July 16 episode of Failon Ngayon sa TeleRadyo, DJ Chacha confirmed that MOR Philippines, along with other regional stations, would officially close on August 28.

That evening, MOR Philippines signed off early, along with 12 local TV Patrol and 10 regional morning shows.

== Final DJs ==
=== MOR 101.9 ===
- Arnold Rei "Popoy" Dela Cruz (2005–20; now with 105.9 True FM)
- Onse (2009–11; 2013–20)
- Chico Martin (2020)
- Nicki Morena (2018–20)
- Maki Rena (2013–20)
- Joco Loco (2013–20)
- Eva Ronda (2013–20)
- DJ Jhai Ho (2013–20; now with 92.3 FMR Manila and PRTV Prime Media)
- Kisses (2016–20)
- Czarina "Chacha Babes/DJ Chacha" Balba-Guevara (2008–20; now with 105.9 True FM)
- Kimbo (2018–20)
- Toni Aquino (2005–20; now with Super Radyo DZBB 594)
- Bea (2010–20)
- Biboy Bwenas (2017–20)
- Ana Ramsey (2016–20; now with TV5 and One PH)

== Former DJs ==
=== DZYL-FM/DZYK-FM ===
- Joey de Leon (1969–72)
- Joey Galvez (1956–72)
- Kuya Cesar† (1956–72)
- Helen Vela† (1964–72, 1973–86)
- Johnny Midnight† (1969–72)
- Ike Lozada (1956–72)
- Rey Langit (1969–72)
- Mario Garcia (1956–72)

=== DWWK-FM/DWOK-FM OK FM (under BBC) ===
- Doddy Lacuna (1973–86)
- Jing Magsaysay (1973–86)
- Wayne Enage (1973–86)
- Ed Picson (1973–86)
- Ronnie Malig (1973–86)
- Pinky Villarama (1973–86)
- Ronnie Quintos (1973–86)
- Eddie Mercado† (1973–86)
- Mike Lacanilao (1973–86)
- Bobby Guanzon (1973–86)
- Mel Tiangco (1981–86)
- Jay Sonza (1981–86)

=== DWKO/Knock Out Radio ===
- Peter "Peter Rabbit" Musñgi (1968–72, 1986–87)
- "Long Tall" Howard Medina (1986–87)
- The Unbeatable† (1986–87)

=== DZOO/Zoo FM ===
- George Boone Mercado (1987–89)
- Gerry "Jeremiah Jr." Magnaye (1987–89)
- Bob Curry (1987–89)
- Bill O'Brien (1987–89)
- Andy "Dave Ryan" Santillan (1987–89)
- Lindy Pellicer (1987–89)
- Jun Banaag (1987–89)

=== Radio Romance ===
- Amy Perez (1989–91)
- Amy Godinez (1989–96)
- Angela
- Anna Reyes
- Big Daddy LBJ
- Bing Palao
- Bon Vibar
- Mike Cohen
- Cathy
- Clay Clavesilia
- Emily
- Glady Macalino
- Jerry Bennett
- Jess Decolongon
- Maxine
- Michiko Makinano
- Mickey
- Monica Figueras (now with DZMM)
- Nessie
- Queenie

=== WRR 101.9: All the Hits, All the Time! ===
- Bob Cat
- Bob Ryder
- Bruce Allan
- John Allen
- Ray Antonio "Johnny Ace" Crisostomo
- MJ "Mister Jellybean" Manlapaz
- Nino "Downtown Nino Brown" Alejandro
- China Heart
- Paul "Ice-T" Parado
- Bryan Christian
- Rick Spade
- Tom Bone

==== Newscasters ====
- Sam
- Alex

=== WRR 101.9 For Life ===
- Martin Oliver "Martin D." Dipasupil† (1996–2016)
- Eric "Chinaheart/Chinapaps" Galang (1997–98, 1999–2018; now with DZMM Radyo Patrol 630)
- Jack Melo (2000–12)
- Reggie Valdez (2000–20)
- Toni Aquino (now on DZBB Super Radyo)
- Candy
- Joel "Danny Bravo" Gorospe (2001–04; now as station manager of DWIZ 882)
- Don Angelo
- Jim Robin
- Don Henry
- AJ Brian
- Michael Vincent
- David Kiss
- Benny Davis
- Billie
- Rikki Mathay (1999–2003)
- Rosel "Geri/Ms. M" Manahan (2002–13)

=== Alam Mo Na Yan/Bespren 101.9 For Life! ===
- Laila Chikadora (2005–10)
- Ric Rider

=== Tambayan 101.9 ===
- Charlie/Papi Charlz (2009–17)
- Jasmin "Baby Girl Jasmin" Basar† (2009–19)

=== MOR 101.9 For Life! ===
- Chito Moreno (2013–14)
- Danny Jay
- Bob Zilla (2013–20)
- Digong Dantes (2016–20)
- Lovely (1998–2000)
- Kinoy
- Josh
- Daddy Alex Calleja (2013–16; now with Bilyonaryo News Channel)
- Chikki Boomboom
- Rica "Inday Yumi" Lazo (2015–18; now with DZMM)
- Mr. Right (2016–19; now with DZMM)

== Former MOR 101.9 Programs ==
- Dyis Is It
- Heartbeats
- Midnight Trip
- Sabado Sikat
- On Air
- Kapamilya Komedya
- My Only Request
- MOR Golden Hits
- Music On Rewind
- Happy Happy Hapon
- MOR Biga10
- MOR Mix
- MOR Playlist
- Yun Na As In
- Quickie
- Playlist pa MORe
- 143 For Life

== Awards ==
- 16th KBP Golden Dove Awardee, Best Radio DJ for Martin D.
- 14th KBP Golden Dove Awardee, Best 'Variety Show Host for Laila.
- 13th KBP Golden Dove Awardee for Outstanding FM Radio Station.
- 13th KBP Golden Dove Awardee for Texter's Choice FM Station – Luzon
- 12th KBP Golden Dove Awardee for 'Best Radio Station.
- Recognized as the Number 1 Radio Station in Metro Manila based on the 2002 KBP-RRC Survey.
- Station of the Year in the 2002 Dangal ng Pilipinas-Consumer's Choice Awards.
- Best Public Service Ad (Pinoy, Ang Galing Mo!) in the 2002 Catholic Mass Media Awards.

== Theme music ==
=== Pre-MOR era ===
- As Radio Romance 101.9, the station's jingle was composed and performed by Jose Mari Chan, airing from November 6, 1995, to September 1996. This theme was later reworked with altered lyrics and reused by the Catholic Media Network's Spirit FM stations from 2002 to 2012, performed by the local band Tellayouthska.
- As WRR 101.9 All The Hits, All The Time, some JAM Creative Productions stingers were used, between 1996-1998 when it was a mainstream station. It even has one of Warp Factor jingle, which was also used during the ZOO 101.9 era, before it switched to TM Studios, Inc. (formerly JonesTM, Inc.) in 1998.
- In 1998, the “For-Life” jingle was launched, performed by Jolina Magdangal-Escueta and Jimmy Bondoc. Shorter versions, sung by various artists, were also used until March 6, 2004. The first verse of this jingle was later reused in the current MOR jingle with altered lyrics. A reworked version, performed by Heart Evangelista and Erik Santos, aired from March 7, 2004, to September 18, 2005.
  - American singer Patti Austin also sang a shorter version of the "For-Life" jingle.
- The station also had jingles and stingers from Memphis River, KISS FM KOBE, More Big Time Radio, Big Time Radio and Big Time 2000 are also used and heard in DWRR, airing until September 2009.
- On September 19, 2005, the station introduced a fresh, upbeat jingle performed by Vhong Navarro, featuring the slogan "Alam Mo Na 'Yan!" in the lyrics. This jingle was used until August 31, 2007.
- On September 1, 2007, the final “For Life” jingle under the station's independent branding was launched. Composed by Raimund Marasigan of Sandwich (formerly of The Eraserheads) and performed by Itchyworms and Yeng Constantino of Pinoy Dream Academy's first season, this jingle aired until September 19, 2009.
- As Tambayan 101.9, the first jingle was performed by Skabeche Band and Empoy Marquez, and was used from November 4, 2009, to December 2010.
- In December 2010, the jingle was remixed and performed by the station's DJs as the Christmas 2010 theme, which was reused for Christmas 2011.
- The second version of the Tambayan jingle, a DJ-style mixed track, was produced by resident DJ Martin D. and used from January 2011 to February 14, 2012.
- The third Tambayan jingle, a remix of the second version featured on the Budots Budots program, served as an interim theme from February 15 to March 4, 2012, while a new jingle was being composed.
- The fourth and final Tambayan 101.9 jingle, performed by Jovit Baldivino, Yeng Constantino, Gloc-9, and Phylum Band, was launched on March 5, 2012. It aired until May 31, 2013, when the station began to drop its distinct branding ahead of its transition to the unified MOR network.
- The second Tambayan Christmas jingle, performed by KZ Tandingan featuring Loonie, aired from November 24, 2012, to January 6, 2013. It was the station's final Christmas jingle under its independent branding.

=== MOR era ===
- On July 7, 2013, alongside the station's rebranding to MOR, a new jingle and music video premiered on ASAP 18, performed by various artists. The original version, recorded by Toni Gonzaga-Soriano, Vice Ganda, and Daniel Padilla, was adopted network-wide and used until August 7, 2016. It was then replaced by a romance-themed version sung by Bailey May and Ylona Garcia, used primarily in Manila, while provincial stations played it occasionally. By June 4, 2017, the original 2013 version returned as the main jingle, with the newer version retained as an alternate.

The jingle incorporated elements from the original For Life theme and pre-2013 MOR regional jingles. On July 21, 2018, ahead of the MOR Philippines relaunch, a new network jingle debuted at the Pinoy Music Awards, blending the 2013 jingle with David Bang's regional stingers. The final version, again performed by Toni, Vice, and Daniel, was officially launched on September 24, 2018, at noon— and continues to be used on MOR Entertainment’s online platform.

- The first MOR Christmas jingle, performed by Angeline Quinto and Juris Lim, aired from November 2013 to January 2014.
- The second MOR Christmas jingle, performed by Michael Pangilinan and Morissette, aired from November 2014 to January 2015.
- A Valentine's version of the jingle aired every February from 2015 to 2020.
- The third MOR Christmas jingle, performed by Marlo Mortel and Janella Salvador, aired from November 2015 to January 2016.
- The fourth MOR Christmas jingle, performed by CJ Navato and Kristel Fulgar, aired from November 2016 to January 2017.
- A Korean-language version of the jingle, performed by Anna Jean Fernandez, debuted in 2018.

== MOR Philippines stations ==
MOR was also broadcast to 15 provincial stations in the Philippines.

== See also ==
- ABS-CBN
- DWWX-TV
- Kapamilya Channel
- DZMM Radyo Patrol 630 (now under the management of PCMC)
- MOR Entertainment
- S+A
- FM Radio 92.3 Manila
