= DXBC-FM =

Defunct radio station in General Santos, Philippines

DXBC
- General Santos; Philippines
- Broadcast area: South Cotabato, Sarangani and surrounding areas
- Frequency: 92.7 MHz

Programming
- Format: Silent (see MOR Entertainment)

Ownership
- Owner: ABS-CBN Corporation

History
- First air date: August 1998
- Last air date: May 5, 2020 (broadcast franchise lapsed/expired)
- Former names: ABS-CBN Radio (1998-2001); My Only Radio (2001-2020)

Technical information
- Licensing authority: NTC

MOR 92.7's logo before May 5 shutdown

DXBC (92.7 FM) was a radio station formerly owned and operated by ABS-CBN Corporation. Its studio and transmitter were located at the ABS-CBN Complex, Quintilla St., Purok Malakas, Brgy. San Isidro, General Santos.

On May 5, 2020, the station, along with the other My Only Radio stations, went off the air due to the cease and desist order of the National Telecommunications Commission following the shutdown of ABS-CBN broadcasting. It currently operates as an online platform named MOR On-Line.
