= DZRR =

Defunct radio station in Baguio, Philippines

- Baguio; Philippines
- Broadcast area: Benguet, La Union and surrounding areas
- Frequency: 103.1 MHz

Programming
- Format: Silent

Ownership
- Owner: ABS-CBN Corporation
- Sister stations: ABS-CBN TV-3 Baguio; S+A Channel 30 Baguio

History
- First air date: August 1, 1989
- Last air date: May 5, 2020 (broadcast franchise lapsed/expired)
- Former names: Radio Romance (1989-1995); ABS-CBN Star Radio (1995-1997); ABS-CBN Radio (1997-1998 ; 1999-2001); ProStar (1998-1999); My Only Radio (2001-2020)

Technical information
- Licensing authority: NTC

MOR 103.1 Baguio Final logo 2018 to 2020.

DZRR (103.1 FM) was a radio station formerly owned and operated by the ABS-CBN Corporation. Its studio was located at the ABS-CBN Broadcast Center, #59 First Road, Quezon Hill Proper, Baguio. Its transmitter was located atop Mt. Sto. Tomas, Tuba, Benguet.

== History ==
DZRR was first launched on August 1, 1989, as "Radio Romance," making ABS-CBN's first FM station outside Metro Manila. It simulcasts its Manila feed.

In 1992, it was converted into local programming, making it the only station to locally use the Radio Romance tagline. In 1995, it became ABS-CBN Star Radio. In 1997, it became ABS-CBN Radio after ABS-CBN restructured its RNG FM stations. In 1998, it temporarily became Prostar along with Dagupan station. In 1999, it returned the ABS-CBN Radio tagline under ABS-CBN for Life.

In 2001, it became MOR My Only Radio; henceforth, the station launched its programming on the same callsign.

On May 5, 2020, the station, along with the other My Only Radio stations, went off the air due to the cease and desist order of the National Telecommunications Commission following the shutdown of ABS-CBN broadcasting. It currently operates as an online platform.
