= MOR Entertainment =

Digital media brand in the Philippines

- Logo of MOR Entertainment since February 14, 2021
- Type: New media network
- Country: Philippines
- Broadcast area: Worldwide (online)
- Headquarters: ABS-CBN Broadcasting Center, Sgt. Esguerra Avenue corner Mother Ignacia Street, Diliman, Quezon City, Metro Manila

Programming
- Languages: Various Philippine languages English

Ownership
- Owner: ABS-CBN Corporation
- Sister stations: MyxRadio

History
- Founded: July 16, 1989
- Former names: Radio Romance (1989–1993); Star Radio (1993–1997); ABS-CBN Radio/ProStar (1997–1999); ABS-CBN For Life! (1999–2001); My Only Radio/MOR Philippines (2001–2021)

Coverage
- Availability: Regional (before July 8, 2013 – August 28, 2020); National (July 8, 2013 – August 28, 2020); Global/Online (since September 14, 2020)

Links
- Webcast: Listen Live via Zeno FM; Listen Live via iWant; Listen live (via TuneIn)

MOR Entertainment is a new media audio streaming service owned and operated by ABS-CBN Corporation.

The MOR brand started in 2001 as the FM brand of ABS-CBN Regional and terrestrially operated 15 radio stations in the Philippines. As a broadcast radio network, MOR stations played contemporary MOR and OPM, as well as radio drama, talk content and news (via TV Patrol Regional over select stations).

Since the forced shutdown of the company's terrestrial assets brought about by the congressional denial of its franchise, MOR resurfaced as an online radio station since September 14, 2020. MOR's content and music streaming remains available via Facebook, Kumu, Spotify, Zeno, TuneIn and iWant.

== History and background ==
=== 1989–1996: Radio Romance ===
ABS-CBN's Manila FM station, DWRR 101.9, rebranded as 101.9 Radio Romance on July 16, 1989, shifting to an easy-listening love song format. Notably, it was the first FM station to use CDs for its playlists and initially featured an all-female DJ lineup, including Amy Perez.

Radio Romance expanded nationwide on August 1, 1989, with DZRR 103.1 Baguio becoming its first relay station. This was followed by DYLS 97.1 Cebu (January 20, 1992) and DXRR 101.1 Davao (January 25, 1992). In the early 1990s, the station began satellite simulcasting across the country, adopting the name Radio Romance: Nationwide.

=== 1993–1997: Star Radio ===
On July 14, 1993, DXEC 91.9 Cagayan de Oro launched as The Great EC 91.9 STAR Radio from its Limketkai Center studios. It was ABS-CBN's first regional station to adopt the “STAR Radio” banner and a mass-based format.

By 1995, ABS-CBN began expanding its ABS-CBN STAR Radio network, branded with the tagline “The Heart of the City.” Newly launched stations included DWEL 95.5 Laoag, DWEC 94.3 Dagupan (as ABS-CBN STAR Radio Northern Luzon, relayed by DZRR), DWRD 93.9 Legazpi, DWAC 93.5 Naga, DYMC 91.1 Iloilo, DYEC 92.7 (Transferred to DYOO 101.5 Bacolod), DYTC 94.3 Tacloban, DXRR 101.1 Davao, DXBC 92.7 General Santos, and DXFH 98.7 Zamboanga. This branding was the initial identity for ABS-CBN's regional FM network, lasting until 1997.

=== 1997–2001: ABS-CBN Radio/ProStar ===
On March 1, 1997, to avoid confusion with the rival Star FM, ABS-CBN's FM stations, now under the Regional Network Group (RNG) (RNG), were rebranded as ABS-CBN Radio. A subset of these regional stations outside Manila adopted the ProStar branding.

On February 8, 1999, ABS-CBN's regional radio stations were rebranded to ABS-CBN For Life!, dropping “Radio” from their name.

=== 2001–2021: My Only Radio ===
On July 14, 2001, ABS-CBN For Life! rebranded as MOR (My Only Radio), first launching in Cagayan de Oro. The name, coined by Malvern Esparcia (Bernie Bitokbitok/Tita B), also subtly referenced Misamis Oriental, Cagayan de Oro's province. This marked a rebrand for ABS-CBN's provincial FM stations, with many undergoing format changes and adopting similar program titles across different areas on July 15, 2001. The MOR brand didn't reach Metro Manila until 2013, when DWRR-FM became its flagship station, solidifying MOR as a national brand.

On January 17, 2011, ABS-CBN launched MOR 99.9 in Palawan, marking a new chapter after 30 years as DYPR. MOR Palawan also operated a shared station, MOR 99.7 (now Radyo Bandera 99.7) in Sofronio Española, from 2011 until 2017.

On June 1, 2018, at a press conference at the ABS-CBN Compound, coinciding with the Manila station's ratings leadership and the announcement of the Pinoy Music Awards, the Manila Radio and Regional divisions agreed to relaunch MOR as MOR Philippines. This relaunch, which began on August 11, aimed to unify Manila and provincial stations with consistent program brands and music selections, encapsulated by the new tagline “One Vibe, One Sound.”

On June 1, 2019, MOR stations in Manila, Cebu, and Baguio expanded their video streaming platforms, becoming exclusive channels on Sky Cable in their respective cities.

In the first quarter of 2020, MOR regional stations temporarily reduced their broadcast hours to 5:00 AM to 12:00 midnight daily due to the COVID-19 pandemic.

Despite unified branding, MOR's programming was managed separately: Manila's station by ABS-CBN's Manila Radio division (which also ran DZMM Radyo Patrol 630) and Star Creatives, while regional programming fell under the company's Regional Network Group.

MOR Philippines launched on August 11, 2018, initially with the debut of MOR Regional's weekend programs, Dyis is It and MOR Presents. These shows premiered in Manila the following day. While the network aimed for unified branding and more national programming, these plans were ultimately shelved after ABS-CBN's terrestrial media assets ceased operations in 2020.

On March 22, 2020, MOR Philippines aired the Pantawid ng Pag-ibig: At Home Together Concert. This event aimed to provide assistance to those in need during the Enhanced Community Quarantine.

==== Shutdown ====
On May 5, 2020, all MOR stations, along with ABS-CBN, S+A, and Radyo Patrol, suspended broadcasting activities due to a cease and desist order from the National Telecommunications Commission. This followed their legislative franchise expiration on May 4, with TV Patrol serving as their final programming.

On July 15, 2020, ABS-CBN announced widespread employee retrenchment effective August 31, following the House of Representatives' denial of their new franchise on July 10. The next day, MOR Manila DJ Czarina Marie Guevara (DJ Chacha) confirmed on Failon Ngayon sa TeleRadyo that MOR Philippines would cease operations on the same retrenchment date.

MOR Philippines, along with ABS-CBN Regional's 12 local TV Patrol and 10 local morning shows, ceased operations on the evening of August 28, 2020, instead of the previously announced August 31.

==== Shift to online programming ====
On September 14, 2020, ABS-CBN rehired select DJs from the defunct MOR Philippines, including Manila-based ones, to relaunch MOR as a digital broadcast platform. This shift mirrors ABS-CBN’s move to digital with Kapamilya Channel and TeleRadyo (now reverted back to DZMM TeleRadyo), focusing on consolidated programming rather than mainly playing music, partly due to Facebook’s copyright limits. The new MOR emphasizes in-house Star Music tracks. Some programs returned with multiple hosts based on their regions, requiring Visayas and Mindanao hosts to use Tagalog for shows like MORe sa Umaga and Dear MOR.

Additionally, shows once exclusive to MOR Manila— except for Dear MOR (now Dear MOR Presents: Dear Popoy, aired across all MOR Facebook pages and MOR TV on Kumu)— were expanded to regional MOR pages, including Onsehan Na! and SLR: Sex, Love and Relationships.

=== 2021–present: MOR Entertainment ===
On February 14, 2021, ABS-CBN relaunched the service as MOR Entertainment with its programming being available on Facebook, Kumu, Spotify, YouTube and iWantTFC. It also streams live on iWantTFC, ABS-CBN Radio Service, Alto and Malaysian based app Syok.

== Former Stations ==
The following frequencies are formerly owned by ABS-CBN prior its forced shutdown on radio in 2020. Some of the frequencies are currently assigned to various media companies.

Branding	Frequency	Location	Status
DWRR	101.9 MHz	Metro Manila	
DWEL	95.5 MHz	Laoag	
DZRR	103.1 MHz	Baguio	
DWEC	94.3 MHz	Dagupan	
DWBA	91.3 MHz	Santiago	
DYCU	99.9 MHz	Puerto Princesa	
DWAC	93.5 MHz	Naga	
DWRD	93.9 MHz	Legazpi	Frequency currently owned by ACWS-United Broadcasting Network.
DYMC	91.1 MHz	Iloilo City	
DYOO	101.5 MHz	Bacolod	Frequency currently owned by Palawan Broadcasting Corporation. Broadcasting as K5 News FM.
DYLS	97.1 MHz	Cebu City	
DYTC	94.3 MHz	Tacloban	Frequency currently owned by Leyte V Electric Cooperative through the Presidential Broadcast Service. Broadcasting as Radyo Kidlat.
DXFH	98.7 MHz	Zamboanga City	
DXEC	91.9 MHz	Cagayan de Oro	Frequency currently owned by the Archdiocese of Cagayan de Oro through the Catholic Bishops' Conference of the Philippines. Broadcasting as Marian Radio.
DXRR	101.1 MHz	Davao City	
DXBC	92.7 MHz	General Santos	Frequency currently owned by the Eagle Broadcasting Corporation.
DXPS	95.1 MHz	Cotabato City	

== Theme music and stingers ==
Before the MOR era in 2001, it has been known to use Radio Romance jingles on early Radio Romance stations. When the first Star Radio opened in 1994 in CDO, it has been spreading to other provinces in 1995. It used jingles from "Hi-Qume" of WKQI and Cut 10 of American Mix from WBLI from JAM Creative Productions. In 1997, it used Cut 4 of American Mix and also some ABS-CBN Shouts with jingles, David Bang sung the theme music for ABS-CBN Radio. In 1999–2001, it was only some jingles from 82.5 Northwave and ABS-CBN shouts and also "For Life!". The first theme music was recorded in English by Anna Fegi in 2001. In 2007, in line with MOR’s 6th anniversary, a pop-rock jingle was launched, entitled "Ang Gusto Ko, MOR" performed by Emman Abatayo of Pinoy Dream Academy. The original jingle was revived in early 2011, performed by artists like Erik Santos, Toni Gonzaga and Aiza Seguerra.

On July 7, 2013, MOR rebranded as a national brand and refreshed its theme, launching a new music video on ASAP 18. The refreshed jingle, recorded in Filipino and English by Toni Gonzaga, Vice Ganda, and Daniel Padilla, incorporated elements from DWRR-FM’s original jingle and the pre-2013 MOR jingle. It was used until August 7, 2016, when a romance-themed version by Bailey May and Ylona Garcia replaced it— mainly on the Manila station, while provincial stations used alternate jingles by Dennis Ba-ang (David Bang). By June 4, 2017, management reverted to the original 2013 jingle as the primary theme, retiring the newer version weeks later.

On July 21, 2018, ahead of its relaunch as MOR Philippines, a new network jingle debuted at the Pinoy Music Awards, blending the 2013 jingle with David Bang's regional stingers. The full version was launched on September 24, 2018, sung once again by Gonzaga, Vice Ganda, and Padilla. Two sub-versions were created, one of them omits the “For Life” tagline for use by regional stations with distinct slogans. This jingle is also used by MOR Entertainment.

== See also ==
- ABS-CBN Broadcasting Corporation
- List of ABS-CBN Corporation channels and stations
- List of radio stations in the Philippines
