= DXEC =

Defunct radio station in Cagayan de Oro, Philippines

- Cagayan de Oro; Philippines
- Broadcast area: Misamis Oriental, Northern Bukidnon and surrounding areas
- Frequency: 91.9 MHz

Programming
- Format: Silent (Frequency currently used by Marian Radio)

Ownership
- Owner: ABS-CBN Corporation

History
- First air date: 1993
- Last air date: May 5, 2020 (broadcast franchise lapsed/expired)
- Former names: The Great EC (1993); Star Radio (1994-1997); ABS-CBN Radio (1997-2001); My Only Radio (July 14, 2001-May 5, 2020)

Technical information
- Licensing authority: NTC

MOR 91.9's logo before May 5 shutdown

DXEC (91.9 FM) was a radio station formerly owned and operated by ABS-CBN Corporation. The station's studios and transmitter were located at the network's broadcast center, Macapagal Dr. (formerly Greenhills Rd.), Brgy. Bulua, Cagayan de Oro. This frequency currently used by 91.9 Marian Radio.

== History ==
DXEC started operations on July 14, 1993, as The Great EC 91.9 Star Radio, with its studios then-located at nearby Limketkai Center.

In 1996, the station launched its own radio drama "Mula Sa Puso Ko" with David Bang as narrator and director. It won the Best Radio Drama Program award in the KBP Golden Dove Awards. In 1997, the station became the Number 1 stations in the city. At the same year, upon the establishment of Regional Network Group, Star Radio was renamed as ABS-CBN Radio 91.9.

In 2000, the station moved to its current home in ABS-CBN Cagayan de Oro's complex in Bulua.

On July 14, 2001, on its 8th year, the station rebranded as MOR: My Only Radio, which became the flagship name of ABS-CBN's Regional Network Group stations.

Since the mid-2000s, MOR had been airing live coverage and updates of the Kagay-an Festival (now Higalaay Festival). Since 2011, TV Patrol North Mindanao, ABS-CBN Cagayan de Oro's local newscast, has also been simulcast over the station.

On May 5, 2020, the station, along with the other My Only Radio stations, went off the air due to the cease and desist order of the National Telecommunications Commission.

Since December 2024, the frequency is used by Marian Radio of the Archdiocese of Cagayan de Oro. Prior to this, it was formerly aired on 103.9 FM from 2017 to 2024.
