= Danny Jay =

British film composer and music producer (born 1993)

Danny Jay (born 1993) is a British film composer and music producer. In December 2008, Danny received the Michael Kamen Award for outstanding achievement in the field of composing music. The award was presented by Nitin Sawhney, Justin Baron (Sibelius), and Mrs Kamen at the Mermaid Theatre in London.

== Career ==
=== Television credits ===
- 2008 -Billy – Casualty
- 2009 -Extra – Skins

=== Film credits ===
- 2010 Sonny – Sonny

=== Awards ===
- 2001 – Bath Chronicle Entertainment Awards for Best Performance in a musical (Billy Elliot – Billy Elliot)
- 2003 – Rose Bowl Awards for Outstanding Young One (Tom Thumb – Barnum)
- 2007- Bristol Hippodromes One to watch in the future
- 2008 – Rose Bowl Award for outstanding performance (Tobias – Sweeney Todd)
- 2010 – Bath Chronicle Outstanding Contribution to entertainment for his service to amateur dramatics
- 2011 Queens Theatre Award for Best Newcomer (Jonathan – Raged In)
