= Shutdown of ABS-CBN broadcasting =

Philippine media event in 2020

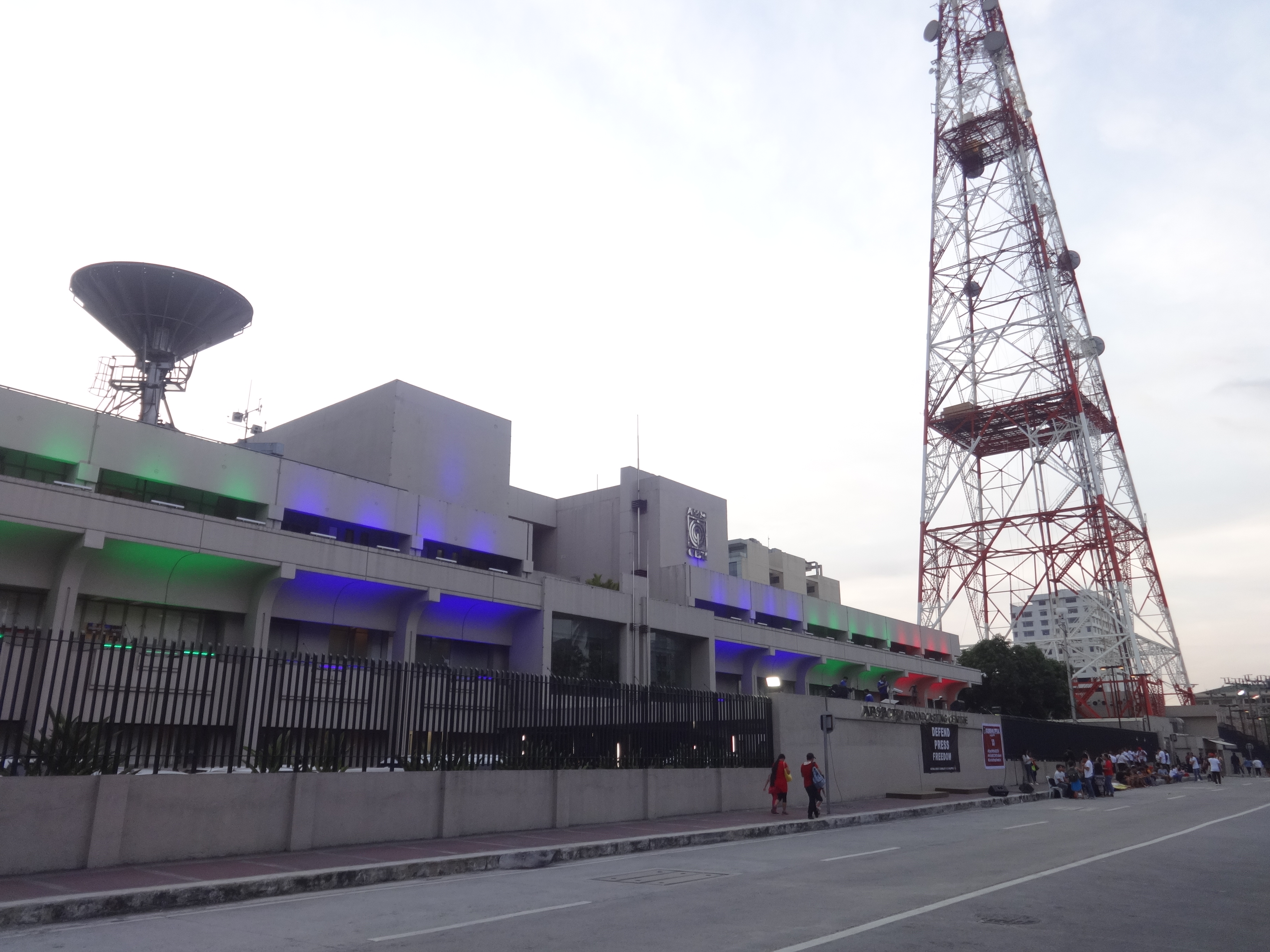
- ABS-CBN Broadcasting Center, the headquarters of the media company ABS-CBN Corporation, in March 2020
- Date: May 5, 2020; 6 years ago
- Also known as: ABS-CBN franchise renewal controversy
- Cause: Political campaign advertisement controversies during the 2016 election; Alleged violations to the now expired broadcast franchise; Multiple labor cases; American citizenship of Eugenio Lopez III; Issuance of the Philippine depository receipts; On the 50-year limit on franchises; Return of the ABS-CBN to the Lopez family after the People Power Revolution; ABS-CBN TV Plus box and KBO pay-per-view; ABS-CBN's blocktime agreement with AMCARA; Failure to regularize its employees; Tax avoidance; Biased reporting; Inappropriate program content; Political meddling
- Participants: ABS-CBN Corporation; Senate of the Philippines; Congress of the Philippines; National Telecommunications Commission (NTC); Department of Labor and Employment (DOLE); Department of Justice (DOJ); Bureau of Internal Revenue (BIR); Movie and Television Review and Classification Board (MTRCB); Kapisanan ng mga Brodkaster ng Pilipinas (KBP); Sky Cable Corporation; AMCARA Broadcasting Network; Securities and Exchange Commission (SEC); Philippine Economic Zone Authority (PEZA); Commission on Elections (COMELEC); Solicitor General Jose Calida; Presidents Benigno Aquino III and Rodrigo Duterte
- Outcome: ABS-CBN broadcast franchise, granted on March 30, 1995, expired on May 4, 2020, without a renewal; The National Telecommunications Commission issued a cease and desist order on ABS-CBN, effectively ceasing broadcast operations on May 5; ABS-CBN Corporation filed petitions before the Supreme Court of the Philippines on May 7, seeking to nullify the NTC's cease and desist order; National Telecommunications Commission and Solicitor General Jose Calida issued two alias cease and desist orders on ABS-CBN TV Plus and Sky Direct, effectively ceasing operations on June 30; The House of Representatives, particularly the Committee on Legislative Franchises, voted 70–11 to deny the franchise application of ABS-CBN; The frequencies assigned to ABS-CBN were recalled by NTC on September 10; ABS-CBN resumed broadcasting through pay-TV Kapamilya Channel on June 13, and free-to-air A2Z (via ZOE TV) on October 10; House Minority Leader Joseph Stephen Paduano urges NTC and BIR to investigate the agreement of ABS-CBN and ZOE Broadcasting Network (A2Z); Former rival TV5 started airing (including reruns) of selected ABS-CBN programming since January 24, 2021; Former rival GMA Network started all Star Cinema movies on April 5, 2022, later has a collaboration with Dreamscape Entertainment and ABS-CBN Studios starting 2023, simulcast of It's Showtime on GMA platforms since July 1, 2023, and collaboration with Banijay Asia to broadcast Pinoy Big Brother starting March 9, 2025; The former television frequencies of ABS-CBN were reassigned to different companies in January 2022; ABS-CBN's supposed acquisition of 34.99% minority stake on TV5 Network in August 2022 was terminated; The former radio frequencies of ABS-CBN were reassigned to different companies in 2023; Subsidiary Sky Cable Corporation's supposed sale to PLDT and with its supposed plans to terminate Sky's cable television services was cancelled in 2024; AMBS' All TV started simulcast of Kapamilya Channel broadcast feed on April 15, 2024, marking ABS-CBN's return to former frequencies after four years; Astro Malaysia Holdings and Mediacorp begin leasing ABS-CBN Soundstage in December 2024; Sale of the ABS-CBN Broadcasting Center to Ayala Land on February 28, 2025; Sale of the former Sky Direct assets to Converge ICT's affiliate Reliance Broadcasting Unlimited in April 2025
- Service(s) affected: ABS-CBN (DWWX); ABS-CBN Sports and Action (DWAC and other AMCARA-affiliated stations); Radyo Patrol (DZMM, DXAB, DYAB and DYAP); MOR (DWRR, DZRR, DYLS, DYTC, DXRR and DXBC); Movie Central; Yey!; Kapamilya Box Office; Asianovela Channel; ABS-CBN TV Plus; Sky Direct

The shutdown of ABS-CBN broadcasting arose from the lack of renewal of Philippine media network ABS-CBN's congressional broadcast franchise. The disputes between the administrations of Presidents Benigno Aquino III and Rodrigo Duterte and the media company arose over the terms and conditions of the franchise renewal agreement. Amid the controversy, the Congress of the Philippines, the country's legislature, was unable to renew the franchise before its expiration date. The congressional franchise expired on May 4, 2020, while the Philippines was dealing with the effects of the COVID-19 pandemic and the enhanced community quarantine in Luzon. The next day, exercising constitutional powers, the National Telecommunications Commission (NTC) issued a cease-and-desist order demanding ABS-CBN to stop the entire broadcast operations of all its free TV and radio stations immediately. ABS-CBN complied with the government order and shut down all of its radio stations and free television channels later that day. On June 30, 2020, the NTC released two alias cease-and-desist orders against ABS-CBN TV Plus and Sky Direct.

For most of the 2010s decade starting from July 28, 2012 up until the early 2020s on September 10, 2020 (during the presidencies of Benigno Aquino III and Rodrigo Duterte), the network had an eight-year controversy regarding the renewal of their broadcast franchise. In 2014, they applied the renewal through private bills that had been pending in the House of Representatives but had not been addressed by either the 16th, 17th, or 18th Congresses of the Philippines. Prominent figures in ABS-CBN Corporation, the political opposition in the Philippines, media advocacy groups, and the international press have attributed Congress's refusal to renew the franchise to Duterte's insistence that ABS-CBN cease broadcasting and labelled it a direct attack on the country's democracy and press freedoms, although sources from the previous administration reported that there was a lack of support for renewal because "Mr. Aquino's allies felt the criticisms against the President were too personal and offensive and went to the point of nitpicking." Duterte's ruling coalition maintains a supermajority in both chambers of Congress, and Duterte criticized the ABS-CBN network for their allegedly biased and unfavorable news coverage against Duterte beginning with his presidential campaign in the 2016 Philippine presidential election, repeatedly voicing his opposition against the renewal of the network's congressional franchise. ABS-CBN subsequently appealed to the Supreme Court of the Philippines to nullify as unconstitutional the cease-and-desist order, which the Court likewise refused to do.

The resulting franchise expiration and withdrawal of its broadcast rights marked the first time ABS-CBN, considered a historical and cultural icon in the Philippines, had been off the air since the 1986 revolution, having been seized and liquidated by the authoritarian government of the Martial Law dictatorship from 1972 until the regime's collapse in 1986. Critics of the Duterte government consider the NTC's cease-and-desist order and the denial of the franchise application as contributing to a growing democratic backsliding in the Philippines under the Duterte administration.

== Background ==
=== Congressional franchise to operate television and radio stations ===
As prescribed by the American Insular government-era Act No. 3846, or the Radio Control Act, which became effective in 1931 (later amended in 1963), broadcasting networks require a congressional franchise to operate television and radio stations, which usually lasts for up to 25 years. Bolinao Broadcasting Corporation, founded by James Lindenberg, which had been operating since July 11, 1946, had its franchise granted by the state through Republic Act No. 512, that took effect August 1950. BEC made its first television broadcast on October 23, 1953 under the operation of Alto Broadcasting System (ABS), which at the time, it using the Channel 3 frequency until 1969. The Manila Chronicle, had its franchise granted by the state on August 1955 though Republic Act No. 1343. Manila Chronicle's broadcast operations were later reorganized as Chronicle Broadcasting Network (CBN). ABS and CBN later merged on 1963, officially becoming the ABS-CBN Broadcasting Corporation.

Republic Act Nos. 5730, 5731 and 5733, granting ABS-CBN Broadcasting Corporation two 50 year franchises were signed by President Ferdinand Marcos on June 21, 1969. It took effect on January 20, 1970. However on September 23, 1972, all of ABS-CBN's assets and frequencies were seized by the government as part of Proclamation No. 1081 of President Marcos. The seized frequencies were later awarded to Banahaw Broadcasting Corporation (BBC) on November 4, 1973 (where it obtained the Channel 2 frequency that ABS-CBN first used from 1969) and the National Media Production Center (would later become Government Television and then Maharlika Broadcasting System or MBS, where it obtained the Channel 4 frequency that ABS-CBN also had used from 1969 to 1972) on February 2, 1974. On November 11, 1974, Presidential Decree (PD) 576-A was signed by President Marcos. The decree formally terminates all existing radio and television frequencies that were awarded, on December 31, 1981 and all new franchises, channels or other means of identifying broadcasting systems applications must be approved by the Board of Communications and the Minister of Public Works and Communications or its successors.

After the February 1986 EDSA revolution, the Presidential Commission on Good Government (PCGG) sequestered the BBC, and, thereafter, the Office of Media Affairs took over the operation of MBS. On 18 June 1986, the PCGG approved the awarding BBC's assigned frequencies to ABS-CBN. The 1987 Philippine Constitution restored Congress the authority to grant radio and television franchises.

There was ambiguity on whether ABS-CBN's 50-year franchises awarded in 1970 were still in effect or it was superseded by 1972's Proclamation No. 1081 and 1974's PD 576-A. To settle the issue, On December 15, 1993, House Bill No. 11611 was filed by Joker Arroyo. The bill intends a new franchise for ABS-CBN. It was approved by the House on third reading on July 26, 1994, the Senate on August 8, 1994 and ratified by both chambers on February 6, 1995. It was signed by President Fidel Ramos on March 30, 1995, under Republic Act No. 7966. This franchise statute was published on the Official Gazette, Malaya and The Manila Times on April 19, 1995 and the new franchise took effect on May 4, 1995. It officially expired on May 4, 2020, as confirmed by the Department of Justice (DOJ).

=== Press freedom and democracy issues ===
The Philippines is touted to have the "freest and liveliest press" in Asia, where media is considered a watchdog and a "fourth estate" helping to maintain the checks and balances of democratic governance. This was however countered by Singapore's Founding Prime Minister Lee Kuan Yew. In a late 1980s speech, he said that the "rambunctious" Philippine press however lively and free it appeared on the outside, did not result to Filipinos becoming that much aware of where their vital interests are and should be, and was not even able to contribute to prevention of Ferdinand Marcos declaring Martial Law of which ABS-CBN (among other assets of the controlling López family, such as MERALCO) eventually fell victim to.

Despite this, the country is consistently ranked as one of the world's most dangerous countries for journalists. In May 2020, it slipped two spots down to 136th place (out of 180 countries) in the World Press Freedom Index.

Media watchdogs such as Reporters Without Borders, the Center for Media Freedom and Responsibility, Amnesty International, the Photojournalists' Center of the Philippines (PCP), Foreign Correspondents Association of the Philippines (FOCAP), and the Consortium on Democracy and Disinformation (D&D) have noted that various forms of attacks against the press have increased since the Duterte administration came to power in 2016 – with the Philippine Daily Inquirer, news website Rappler, nonprofit media organizations like Vera Files and the Philippine Center for Investigative Journalism, and ABS-CBN being particular targets because of coverage critical of the administration.

Many of these media watchdogs have issued statements placing the ABS-CBN broadcast stoppage in the context of systemic attacks against press freedom in the Philippines. Media groups and people's organizations denounced the shutdown order for being a loss of democracy, freedom of expression, and freedom of the press.

Some groups also placed the matter in the context of attacks and harassment aimed at those that criticize the government and compared it to the takeover of media outlets during martial law under Ferdinand Marcos, as well as to pressure to shutdown media outlets under different administrations. For example, under President Joseph Estrada, The Manila Times was threatened with libel and closure, resulting in the newspaper's eventual sale from the Gokongwei family to Dante Ang, a crony of Estrada; while the Philippine Daily Inquirer was subjected to an advertising boycott. Both newspapers ran stories critical of Estrada.

=== ABS-CBN market share ===
The ABS-CBN broadcast network is acknowledged to be one of the Philippines' oldest and most influential media networks, run by the López family. The company generates about 50 to 60 percent of the group's total annual revenue, mainly from selling airtime of its television and radio properties to advertisers. The remaining revenue is generated from consumer sales through the distribution of cable and international channels, operations of over-the-top platform services, and a family entertainment center in Taguig. According to the Philippine Competition Commission (PCC), ABS-CBN Corporation controlled "somewhere between 31% and 44%" of the Philippines' total television market as of 2020.

=== Prior broadcast stoppage under Ferdinand Marcos ===
Before the 2020 stoppage, ABS-CBN had been closed down on September 23, 1972, when martial law under Ferdinand Marcos was announced and the station's television and radio stations were sequestered. Marcos' Letter of Instruction No. 1-A, signed September 22, 1972, and addressed to the Secretary of the Department of National Defense, accused ABS-CBN, Associated Broadcasting Corporation (now known as TV5) and Manila Broadcasting Company TV station DZRH-TV Channel 11 of delivering "deliberately slanted and overly exaggerated news stories and commentaries," of promoting the ends of the Communist Party of the Philippines, and of having been instrumental in an assassination attempt on Marcos. This stoppage lasted until September 14, 1986, when ABS-CBN returned to air resulting from the recovery and return of the sequestered stations to the network.

During those 13 years, use of the company's frequencies (except DZXL-AM 620, awarded to KBS/RPN as DWWW, DZMM-AM 1000, awarded to GMA (later Nation Broadcasting Corporation) as DWXX (now DZAR Sonshine Radio), DZMY-AM 1160 awarded to BBC as DWWA, DZQL-AM 830, awarded to Office of Civil Defense as DZCA, and DZXL-TV 4, awarded to the government-owned National Media Production Center for the launch of Government Television as DWGT-TV in 1974) was awarded to the Banahaw Broadcasting Corporation (BBC) owned by Marcos crony and sugar plantation owner Roberto Benedicto and was launched on November 4, 1973. Under martial law, BBC formed a de facto media monopoly with Kanlaon Broadcasting System/Radio Philippines Network (KBS/RPN, which originally also founded and owned by James Lindenberg and had taking over the Channel 9 frequency previously also used by ABS-CBN from 1958 to 1969), Intercontinental Broadcasting Corporation (IBC, acquired in 1975), and government-owned Government Television/Maharlika Broadcasting System (GTV/MBS). The company's headquarters, the ABS-CBN Broadcasting Center, was also sequestered without compensation from the network's owners and was renamed as Broadcast Plaza to serve as headquarters of BBC, KBS/RPN, GTV/MBS and, from 1980, the Bureau of Broadcasts (BB). Moreover, copies of the old pre-Martial Law ABS-CBN shows had also been lost due to the raid by Marcos troops.

Marcos was eventually deposed by the People Power Revolution of February 1986. The newly created revolutionary government agency Presidential Commission on Good Government (PCGG) sequestered and later dissolved BBC and returned the frequencies to ABS-CBN on September 7, 1986, eventually resuming broadcast on September 14, 1986.

== History ==
=== Early renewal initiatives ===
On December 12, 2012, there was a resolution asking the Committee on Legislative Franchises to inquire, in aid of legislation, the "probable violations of ABS-CBN of its legislative franchise."

In 2014 and 2015, ABS-CBN requested the 16th Congress to tackle the extension of its franchise early, although its renewal was not due until six years later, in 2020.

Media sources in the legislature indicated that the network's 2016 initiative was the result of having been "particularly singled out" by supporters of President-elect Rodrigo Duterte because of the perception that they "consistently showed him in a negative light". The Philippine Daily Inquirer reported that a member of the House legislative franchise committee said ABS-CBN "did not want to risk going through the renewal under an 'unfriendly' administration".

The Inquirer's source also said that the initiative "lacked support from President Benigno Aquino III's allies in the House" because they felt that ABS-CBN's criticisms against Aquino were "too personal and offensive and went to the point of nitpicking".

ABS-CBN eventually had to withdraw these franchise renewal initiatives due to time constraints.

=== Ad controversies during the 2016 Philippine presidential campaign ===
Philippine President Rodrigo Duterte attributed his objection to the franchise renewal of ABS-CBN to an election ad controversy during the campaign leading up to the 2016 Philippine presidential election. He said the network refused to air his 2016 presidential campaign ads and favored the negative political ads paid by then-vice presidential candidate Antonio Trillanes critical of his remarks on the campaign trail.

On February 24, 2020, the network's president and chief executive officer Carlo López Katigbak apologized to Duterte for not airing his political advertisements during his 2016 polls. Duterte accepted the apology, leaving the franchise's renewal to Congress. ABS-CBN also offered to return the money spent for these advertisements, which Duterte declined, stating that the money should be donated to a charity instead.

Meanwhile, Commission on Elections spokesperson James Jimenez defended the controversial ad as well within Election Law, under "Partisan Political Activity".

=== Renewal initiatives during the 17th and 18th Congress ===
==== Non-renewal assertions by Congress ====
Throughout his term, which coincides with the 17th and 18th Congress, Duterte publicly reiterated that he would oppose the franchise renewal of ABS-CBN.

Opposition lawmakers, as well as labor groups, objected to Duterte's stand on ABS-CBN as the franchise non-renewal will compromise the employees of the network; stating that the blocking of the franchise renewal had no merit. Opposition groups have expressed their opinions that the non-renewal of the franchise violates press freedom.

Duterte later changed his stance after the network's apology, stating that he would not interfere with the franchise renewal in Congress. However, Duterte did not say whether he would veto the bill or not.

==== 17th Congress ====
In November 2016, Nueva Ecija representative Micaela Violago filed House Bill 4349 in the 17th Congress to renew the network's franchise. The 17th Congress adjourned sine die with the bill never getting out of committee.

==== Deliberations during the 18th Congress ====
During the 18th Congress of the Philippines, at least 12 house representatives and two senators filed their versions for a new network franchise. House Speaker Alan Peter Cayetano made assurances that Congress will tackle the franchise with fairness.

Bills filed in the 18th Congress for ABS-CBN's franchise renewal
Bill number	Author/s	Date filed	Ref
HB 676	Micaela Violago	July 1, 2019	
HB 3064	Jericho Nograles	July 29, 2019	
HB 3521	Rose Marie "Baby" Arenas	August 6, 2019	
HB 3713	Joy Myra Tambunting, Joseph Stephen Paduano (withdrew on July 9, 2020)	August 8, 2019	
HB 3947	Sol Aragones	August 14, 2019	
SB 981	Ralph Recto	August 28, 2019	
HB 4305	Vilma Santos-Recto	September 2, 2019	
HB 5608	Aurelio Gonzales, Johnny Pimentel, Salvador "Doy" Leachon	November 25, 2019	
HB 5705	Rufus Rodriguez	December 4, 2019	
HB 5753	Josephine Ramirez-Sato	December 9, 2019	
HB 6052	Carlos Zarate, Ferdinand Gaite, Eufemia Cullamat, France Castro, Sarah Jane Elago	January 27, 2020	
HB 6138	Mark Go	January 30, 2020	
HB 6293	Loren Legarda	February 13, 2020	
SB 1403	Ramon "Bong" Revilla Jr.	March 5, 2020	

Bills filed in the 19th Congress for ABS-CBN's franchise renewal
Bill number	Author/s	Date filed	Ref
HB 00431	Johnny Pimentel	June 30, 2022	
HB 01218	France Castro, Arlene Brosas, Raoul Mannuel	July 7, 2022	
HB 11252	Joey Salceda	January 7, 2025	

On January 6, 2020, Albay representative Edcel Lagman filed House Resolution 639, urging the House Committee on Legislative Franchises for its immediate action on the several bills lodged to the committee. At least 91 other representatives signed the resolution.

On February 24, 2020, the Congress finally made its decision to tackle their franchise renewal. During a Senate hearing on the same day, public services panel chair Grace Poe stated they were to tackle ABS-CBN's compliance with the terms and conditions of its franchise. The conclusion was that there was no breach of laws or franchise terms. The following is a summary of the findings:

1. The Bureau of Internal Revenue stated that ABS-CBN had fully complied with the tax requirements of the government. Sir Cabantac Jr., BIR Large Taxpayers Service head stated that the company had paid P14.298 billion from 2016 to 2019. In 2019, ABS-CBN also settled P152.44 million in tax payments with the BIR.
2. The Department of Labor and Employment cleared the media giant for its compliance with general labor standards, occupational safety and health, and security of tenure. Former ABS-CBN corporate services head Mark Nepomuceno said they also have contributed to mandatory employee benefits such as Social Security System, PhilHealth, and Pag-IBIG Fund. He also stated that ABS-CBN was no longer practicing end-of-contract scheme, as well as giving benefits to independent contributors varying per contract negotiation
3. Telecommunications Commissioner General Gamaliel Cordoba stated that franchise laws cover "commercial purposes", including pay-per-view service. Section 1 of Republic Act 7908, which allows ABS-CBN Covergence's broadcast operations, states that: "It is hereby granted a franchise to construct, operate, and maintain, for commercial purposes." Even though ABS-CBN introduced the service without NTC guidelines yet, the fine for such violation is a measly P200. Senate President Recto stated that the NTC can just impose a fine on ABS-CBN rather than shutdown.
4. Securities and Exchange Commission Commissioner Ephyro Amatong clarified that a legal interpretation from 1999 stated that Philippine Depository Receipts were not equivalent to certificates of ownership, which may have evolved in recent years. Senator Poe pointed out that companies should be notified of any changes in the legal interpretation of the investment instrument, as all media companies have to be 100% Filipino-owned. Issuing PDRs is a common practice among Philippine media outfits—including Rappler and GMA. The SEC has not yet conducted a review whether there are violations in ABS-CBN's PDRs, with Amatong saying he "would rather not make a categorical statement at this time" as to whether there are violations in ABS-CBN's PDRs, given the pending case at the Supreme Court, as of May 6, 2020.

=== Quo warranto petition ===
On February 10, 2020, Solicitor General of the Philippines Jose Calida filed a quo warranto petition before the Supreme Court of the Philippines seeking to revoke ABS-CBN's franchise and that of its subsidiary ABS-CBN Convergence over alleged breaches of its franchise, including operating its pay-per-view service Kapamilya Box Office (KBO), constitutional restriction on foreign ownership of mass media, and resorted to an ingenious corporate layering scheme, to transfer its subsidiary's franchise without Congressional approval. The network responded to disprove the allegations leveled against it.

Within the same month, various congressmen urged the National Telecommunications Commission (NTC) to grant a provisional authority to ABS-CBN to continue operations after the lapse of its current franchise until Congress should have decided on its franchise application. Having consulted with the Department of Justice (DOJ), the NTC affirmed in March 2020 that it would "likely" issue a provisional authority to ABS-CBN and "let ABS-CBN continue operations based on equity". However, the Federation of International Cable TV and Telecommunications Associations of the Philippines (FICTAP) questioned the provisional authority, stating that it would be unconstitutional.

On June 23, 2020, the Supreme Court of the Philippines dismissed the quo warranto petition to revoke ABS-CBN Corporation's franchise, stating that the petition was moot and academic as the franchise had already expired, therefore the Court would not be changing anything by voiding the franchise ab initio. However, the quo warranto petition filed against ABS-CBN Convergence Inc. for allegedly illegally operating KBO remains pending.

=== Planned provisional authority cancellation ===
On March 5, 2020, lawyer Larry Gadon filed a petition for prohibition before the Supreme Court of the Philippines, seeking to stop Telecommunications Commissioner Gamaliel Cordoba, House Speaker Alan Peter Cayetano, and House Committee on Legislative Franchises Chairman Franz Alvarez from issuing ABS-CBN's provisional authority, saying the provisional authority to operate violates the doctrine of separation of powers.

Sixteen days after the shutdown, Gadon announces that he is withdrawing the petition which he filed, seeking to stop Cordoba, Cayetano, and Alvarez from issuing provisional authority, stating that was rendered moot and the act sought to be prevented no longer exists.

On June 2, 2020, the Supreme Court of the Philippines dismissed the petition for the prohibition against Telecommunications Commissioner Gamaliel Cordoba, House Speaker Alan Peter Cayetano, and House Committee on Legislative Franchises Chairman Franz Alvarez from issuing provisional authority, stating that the court does not deem it efficient.

=== May 2020 broadcast shutdown ===
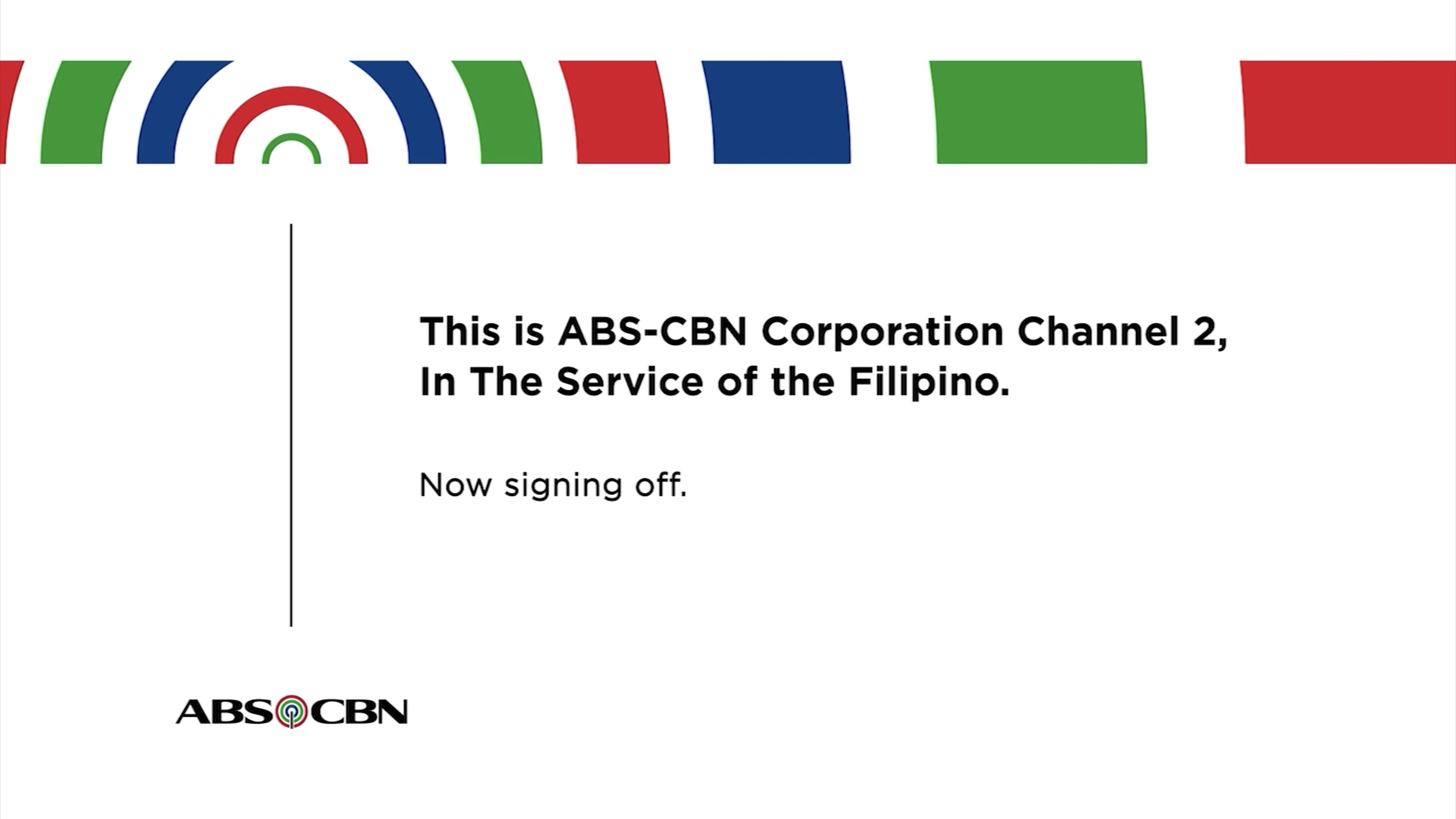
The sign-off message broadcast by DWWX-TV (ABS-CBN Manila) before stopping all broadcasts at 7:52 pm (PST) in compliance with the NTC order

External videos
- "ABS-CBN goes off air in compliance with NTC order", ABS-CBN News via YouTube

The logo of ABS-CBN during its 2020 shutdown

On May 3, 2020, Jose Calida warned the NTC against granting the provisional authority to ABS-CBN, citing a Supreme Court decision in 2014, stating that provisional authority can only be granted after the franchise is secured in Congress. In the same statement, Calida cautioned that the agency would put itself at risk of prosecution under the Anti-Graft and Corrupt Practices Act should they issue the provisional authority without a legal franchise being held by ABS-CBN's operating companies and that a 1991 DOJ opinion stating the NTC may issue provisional authority without a legal franchise was overturned by the Supreme Court.

On May 5, 2020, Philippine House Committee on Legislative Franchises chairperson Franz Alvarez warned the NTC from backtracking. If they did, the NTC could be held in contempt for refusal to issue a provisional authority to ABS-CBN. Six days before, the House Committee on Legislative Franchises issued a show cause order against NTC Commissioner Gamaliel Cordoba, Deputy Commissioners Edgardo Cabarios, Delilah Deles, and Legal Branch Head Ella Blanca Lopez to explain why should not be cited in contempt for issuing the cease and desist order against ABS-CBN. The NTC responded by stating that it was legally bound to order the shutdown of ABS-CBN and apologized to the House of Representatives for failing to notify it of the shutdown order.

On the same day, NTC issued a cease and desist order to immediately stop its entire free-to-air broadcasting operations, including its radio stations DZMM, S+A, and MOR Philippines, following the expiration of its broadcast franchise the day before. The cease and desist order covers 42 free television stations operated by ABS-CBN across the country, including the main ABS-CBN Network, ten digital broadcast channels, 18 FM stations, and five AM stations.

Following the news program TV Patrol, the network signed off the air at 7:52 pm (PST). ABS-CBN executives Carlo Katigbak and Mark Lopez aired statements on the program appealing the NTC's cease and desist order. The newscast was also simulcast on DZMM, S+A, and MOR stations. DZMM radio and television counterpart signed off at 8:20 pm, following SRO: Suhestyon, Reaksyon at Opinyon and rebranded simply as TeleRadyo following the newscast and the digital television networks available on ABS-CBN TV Plus including Asianovela Channel, Movie Central, and the terrestrial operations of Jeepney TV, Myx, O Shopping, and Knowledge Channel also signed off. After the cease and desist order, Cine Mo!, Yey!, and the KBO remain unaffected (during the television premiere of The Mall, the Merrier! on KBO channel from May 1–6, 2020).

However, ABS-CBN News Channel (ANC), the cable operations of Knowledge Channel, The Filipino Channel (TFC), TeleRadyo (later TeleRadyo Serbisyo and now back to DZMM TeleRadyo), and its sister cable channels (run by subsidiary Creative Programs including Metro Channel, which was named after Metro Magazines whose publisher is ABS-CBN Publishing), as well as its online properties, and production companies Star Music and Star Cinema, were allowed to continue as their operations are not contingent on the legislative franchise.

Along with the order, NTC gave ABS-CBN 10 days to explain why its assigned frequencies should not be recalled. In response on May 15, 2020, ABS-CBN reasoned that "it would be detrimental to the public interest as it would hamper the ability of ABS-CBN to immediately resume serving the public through its broadcasts, once the franchise is granted". Additionally, House Bill 6732 was proposed by House Speaker Alan Peter Cayetano on May 13, 2020, which would have granted the network a provisional franchise to operate until October 31. Subsequently, on May 27, 2020, NTC was told to refrain from carrying out the recall while the Congress deliberates on the measures to grant provisional franchise and a fresh franchise.

=== Post-shutdown developments ===
On May 7, 2020, TV Patrol resumed broadcast on the ABS-CBN News Channel, as it simulcast the program from the leading network since March due to the COVID-19 pandemic programming changes. It was also simulcast on its news website, its Facebook and YouTube pages, as well as on The Filipino Channel to viewers outside the country. On May 8, 2020, the following day, TV Patrol began airing on Cine Mo! and returned on TeleRadyo.

ABS-CBN Corporation filed a petition for certiorari and prohibition as well as temporary restraining order (TRO) to the Supreme Court of the Philippines, seeking to nullify the NTC's cease and desist order on May 7, 2020. (See § Supreme Court case below.) The Senate and the House of Representatives filed respective bills urging NTC to reconsider its order, as well as to abolish the agency itself.

On May 8, 2020, TeleRadyo, resumed its regular programming airing the usual DZMM programming format. TeleRadyo is carried through ABS-CBN TV Plus, making it one of three exclusive channels (the others being Cine Mo! and Yey!) that remain operational on digital free-to-air television after the NTC's order takes effect. ABS-CBN later clarified in a statement that the three channels, along with Kapamilya Box Office channel, continued broadcasting and received in Metro Manila, Laguna province, Iloilo province, and selected areas of Baguio through a block time agreement with AMCARA Broadcasting Network (former owner of Studio 23 from its 1996 launch until ABS-CBN acquired a stake in AMCARA in 2010) owned by the Carandang family. On the same day, MOR Philippines also resumed its online and cable operations through a national programming service set up by the network's flagship station in Metro Manila.

On May 11, 2020, House Representatives Paolo Duterte, Eric Go Yap, and Abraham Tolentino filed House Resolution No. 853, seeking to probe into the corporation's possible violation of its franchise.

On June 1, 2020, Jeepney TV and Asianovela Channel resumed broadcasting on ABS-CBN TV Plus as temporary channel replacements for ABS-CBN and S+A, but both channels are still on free trial.

On June 4, 2020, ABS-CBN announced on TV Patrol that a cable-and-satellite channel named Kapamilya Channel would launch on June 13, resuming the ABS-CBN productions and aired its entertainment, news and current affairs programming, along with movie blocks. However, because of the "double blow" of the network's temporary suspension of production of entertainment programs during the enhanced community quarantine in Luzon caused by the COVID-19 pandemic and free TV shutdown due to expired franchise, some of its programs no longer pushed through.

=== Alias cease-and-desist order ===
On June 30, 2020, the NTC issued an alias cease-and-desist order demanding ABS-CBN TV Plus to stop broadcasting all of its digital free-to-air channels on UHF Channel 43 in Metro Manila and some provinces, as well as Sky Direct to stop operating nationwide.

=== Congressional hearings for a new franchise ===
On May 13, 2020, House Bill 6732, proposed by House Speaker Alan Peter Cayetano, which grants the network a provisional franchise to operate until October 31, 2020 "unless sooner revoked or canceled", was approved by the House of Representatives convening as a Committee of the Whole. The said bill was awaiting for third and final reading after which it would have been transmitted to the Senate; but on May 19, 2020, the proposal was withdrawn with the chamber opting to go straight to hearing measures seeking to grant the media giant a fresh 25-year franchise.

- The first day of hearings was held on May 26, under the auspices of the Joint Committee for Legislative Franchises, Good Governance, and Public Accountability, where ABS-CBN President and CEO Carlo Katigbak and Deputy Speaker Rodante Marcoleta gave their respective side's opening statements.
- The second day, held on June 1, tackled the media company's ownership concerns.
- The third day was held on June 3, mainly focused on Eugenio Lopez III's citizenship.
- The fourth hearing was held on June 8, which also focused on Lopez III's citizenship. These first days of the hearings focused on Eugenio Lopez III dual citizenship status being a Filipino and an American citizen at the same time.
- The fifth hearing was held on June 11, which tackled the legalities of ABS-CBN's issuance of PDRs or Philippine Depositary Receipts. During the course of the hearing, the PDRs were determined to be legal but these raised questions on the real motives of the financial instrument.
- The sixth hearing was held on June 15, tackled the media company's closure during Marcos regime and return to the Lopez family after the People Power Revolution in 1986. Questions on the return to the Lopez family were raised in particular to the arbitrary procedure and the settlement agreement that were agreed upon.
- The seventh hearing was held on June 17, which was attended by former Senate president Juan Ponce Enrile, tackled the constitutional 50-year limit on congressional franchises and airing of a program on DXAS-TV (ABS-CBN Davao) hosted by Duterte called Gikan sa Masa, Para sa Masa.
- The eighth hearing was held on June 29, tackled the network's blocktime agreement with AMCARA Broadcasting Network for continuous airing of the network's programs on free-to-air digital television through DWBM-TV (UHF Channel 43) in ABS-CBN TV Plus set-top box in Metro Manila, Laguna, selected areas of Baguio, and Iloilo. During the hearings, questions were raised both to AMCARA and ABS-CBN on the seemingly long term block time arrangements.
- The ninth hearing was held on June 30, tackled the media company's labor issues. Questions were raised on program-based contracts and independent contractors which are prevalent in most broadcasting companies.
- The tenth hearing was held on July 1, tackled the media company's tax delinquencies. Questions were raised regarding the actual tax payments of ABS-CBN pointing out to government tax incentives that were availed.
- The eleventh hearing was held on July 2, continuing the issues on taxes and labor practices.
- The twelfth hearing was held on July 6, tackling allegations of biased reporting from the network and its coverage of the 2016 general election, and also tackled issues regarding inappropriate program content on some concluded programs of ABS-CBN.
- The thirteenth hearing which was a summation of arguments was held on July 9, with Representatives Carlos Zarate and Rodante Marcoleta respectively delivering the closing arguments for, and against the renewal.
- On July 10, members of the House of Representatives, particularly the Committee on Legislative Franchises, voted 70–11 to deny the franchise application of ABS-CBN, citing several issues on the network's franchise.

=== Supreme Court case ===
ABS-CBN Corporation v. National Telecommunications Commission
- Court: Supreme Court of the Philippines
- Submitted: May 7, 2020
- Started: May 19, 2020
- Verdict: Dismissed (holding for the NTC)
- Citation: G.R. No. 252119

Questions presented
- Is the ABS-CBN broadcast stoppage of "transcendental" constitutional importance? If so, was the NTC's CDO legal?

Outcome
- As Congress has the sole authority to grant legislative franchises, the Court would be acting beyond its authority under the principle of the separation of powers if it were to restore either ABS-CBN's temporary NTC permit to use the frequencies it had once been assigned, or for that matter its permanent franchise.

On May 7, 2020, ABS-CBN filed a petition for certiorari and prohibition asking the Court to issue a temporary restraining order (TRO) against the implementation of the National Telecommunications Commission's cease and desist order. If granted, this TRO would allow them to operate until the case is decided. However, some lawyers have questioned the legal merits of the petition, as it was filed right to the Supreme Court, even before a motion for reconsideration before the NTC or a case in the Court of Appeals. In the petition, ABS-CBN argues that it is proper to have filed first in the Supreme Court, as the case in their view involves "genuine issues of constitutionality that must be addressed at the most immediate time" and that their petition is of "transcendental importance". On May 18, Larry Gadon filed a motion for consolidation against the ABS-CBN's temporary restraining order, stating that it violates the hierarchy of the courts and the case must be filed at the CA. The following day, the Court accepted the case, ordered the NTC to reply, and impleaded both the House and Senate and dismissing Gadon's plea for a consolidation. The NTC filed its required comment on May 26.

The Supreme Court set a further hearing for July 13 on the merits of the petition, though there may not be a ruling on that date. However, the hearing was rescheduled to August 4, 2020.

The petition to issue a temporary restraining order was dismissed by the Supreme Court on August 25, 2020. In its ruling, the Court invoked the principle of the separation of powers, leaving the matter to Congress.

=== House of Representatives votes on the franchise renewal ===
The following is a list of how members of the House Committee on Legislative Franchises voted.

NO to the resolution denying the renewal of the ABS-CBN franchise (11):

- Sol Aragones – Laguna, 3rd District
- Christopher de Venecia – Pangasinan, 4th District
- Carlos Zarate – Bayan Muna Party-list
- Gabriel Bordado – Camarines Sur, 3rd District
- Vilma Santos – Batangas, 6th District
- Lianda Bolilia – Batangas, 4th District
- Jose I. Tejada – North Cotabato, 3rd District
- Bienvenido Abante – Manila, 6th District
- Stella Quimbo – Marikina, 2nd District
- Mujiv Hataman – Basilan, Lone District
- Edward Maceda – Manila, 4th District

YES to the resolution denying the ABS-CBN franchise (77 - Note: Unofficial list compiled from various news sources. Congressmen refuse to release official list. According to Prof. Jean Franco, associate professor for the University of the Philippines Political Science Department, this translates to lack of transparency and accountability. Franco also stated that the congressmen may be hiding their votes out of fear of vendetta.):

- Raneo "Ranie" E. Abu – Batangas, 2nd District
- Beng Abueg – Palawan, 2nd District
- Gil Acosta Jr. – Palawan, 3rd District
- Tonypet Albano – Isabela, 1st District
- Samantha Louise Vargas Alfonso – Cagayan, 2nd District
- Juan Miguel "Mikey" Macapagal Arroyo – Pampanga, 2nd District
- Cristal L. Bagatsing – Manila, 5th District
- Julienne "Jam" L. Baronda – Iloilo City, Lone District
- Elpidio "Pidi" F. Barzaga, Jr.† – Cavite, 4th District
- Claudine Diana "Dendee" D. Bautista – DUMPER PTDA Party-list
- Juan Pablo "Rimpy" P. Bondoc – Pampanga, 4th District
- Antonio "Tony" Calixto – Pasay, Lone District (representing Rep. J. Lacson-Noel)
- Precious Hipolito Castelo – Quezon City, 2nd District
- Joaquin "Jun" M. Chipeco Jr. – Calamba, Lone District
- Ma. Theresa "Maitet" V. Collantes – Batangas, 3rd District
- Anthony Peter "Onyx" Crisologo – Quezon City, 1st District
- Francisco "Jun" Datol† – SENIOR CITIZENS Party-list (representing Rep. M. Romero)
- Michael "Mike" Defensor – ANAKALUSUGAN Party-list (representing Rep. R. Puno)
- Paolo "Pulong" Z. Duterte – Davao City, 1st District
- Faustino Michael Carlos T. Dy III – Isabela, 5th District
- Faustino "Inno" A. Dy V – Isabela, 6th District
- Ian Paul L. Dy – Isabela, 3rd District
- Conrado M. Estrella III – Abono Partylist
- Ria Christina G. Fariñas – Ilocos Norte, 1st District
- Danilo "Dan" S. Fernandez – Laguna, 1st District
- Bayani F. Fernando† – Marikina, 1st District
- Luis "Jon-Jon" Ferrer IV – Cavite, 6th District
- Pablo John F. Garcia – Cebu, 3rd District
- Janette L. Garin (Ex-Officio) – Iloilo, 1st District
- Sharon S. Garin – AAMBIS-OWA Party-list
- Weslie Gatchalian – Valenzuela, 1st District
- Aurelio "Dong" Gonzales, Jr. - Pampanga, 3rd District
- Sandro Gonzales – Marino Party-list (representing Rep. P. Pichay)
- Eduardo "Eddie" R. Gullas† – Cebu, 1st District
- Ferdinand L. Hernandez - South Cotabato, 2nd District
- Bernadette "BH" Herrera-Dy – BH Party-List
- Dulce Ann K. Hofer – Zamboanga Sibugay, 2nd District
- Josephine Veronique R. Lacson-Noel - Malabon City, Lone District
- Eleandro Jesus F. Madrona – Romblon, Lone District
- Dale "Along" R. Malapitan – Caloocan, 1st District
- Esmael "Toto" G. Mangudadatu – Maguindanao, 2nd District
- Rodante D. Marcoleta – Sagip Party-list
- Eric M. Martinez – Valenzuela, 2nd District
- Francisco Jose "Bingo" Matugas II – Surigao del Norte, 1st District (representing Rep. J. Pimentel)
- Raymond Democrito C. Mendoza – Trade Union Congress of the Philippines Party-list
- Roger G. Mercado – Southern Leyte, Lone District
- John Marvin "Yul Servo" C. Nieto – Manila, 3rd District
- Juan Fidel Felipe Nograles – Rizal, 2nd District (representing Rep. F. Hernandez)
- Jericho Jonas B. Nograles – Puwersa ng Bayang Atleta Party-list
- Henry S. Oaminal – Misamis Occidental, 2nd District
- Joseph Stephen "Caraps" S. Paduano – ABANG LINGKOD Party-list
- Wilter "Sharky" Wee Palma II – Zamboanga Sibugay, 1st District
- Prospero A. Pichay, Jr. - Surigao del Sur, 1st District
- Johnny Ty Pimentel - Surigao del Sur, 2nd District
- Enrico A. Pineda – 1-PACMAN Party-list
- Roberto V. Puno - Antipolo City, 1st District
- Jesus Crispin "Boying" C. Remulla – Cavite, 7th District
- Strike B. Revilla – Cavite, 2nd District
- Michael L. Romero, Ph.D. – 1-PACMAN Party-list
- Ferdinand Martin G. Romualdez – Leyte, 1st District
- Yedda Marie K. Romualdez – Tingog Sinirangan Party-list
- Xavier Jesus D. Romualdo – Camiguin, Lone District
- Deogracias Victor Savellano† – Ilocos Sur, 1st District
- Frederick W. Siao – Iligan, Lone District
- Jose "Bonito" C. Singson, Jr. – PROBINSYANO AKO Party-list
- Jose "Kuya" Antonio Sy-Alvarado – Bulacan, 1st District
- Alyssa Sheena P. Tan – Isabela, 4th District
- Sharee Ann T. Tan – Samar, 2nd District
- Arnolfo "Arnie" A. Teves, Jr. – Negros Oriental, 3rd District
- Abraham "Bambol" N. Tolentino – Cavite, 8th District
- Allan Ty – LPGMA Party-list
- Christian S. Unabia – Misamis Oriental, 1st District
- Rolando M. Valeriano – Manila, 2nd District
- Luis Raymond "LRay" Villafuerte, Jr. – Camarines Sur, 2nd District
- Camille A. Villar – Las Piñas, Lone District
- Eric Go Yap – ACT-CIS Partylist
- Divina Grace C. Yu – Zamboanga del Sur, 1st District

Recused from voting (2):

- Alfred Vargas – Quezon City, 5th District, citing "conflict of interest."
- Micaela Violago – Nueva Ecija, 2nd District

Abstained from voting (1):

- Alfredo Garbin Jr. – AKO BICOL Party-list

=== Recall of frequencies and channels ===
On September 10, 2020, the NTC issued an order recalling all TV and radio frequencies and channels assigned to ABS-CBN and its related radio and local TV stations. The NTC cited the absence of a "valid legislative franchise" as justification for the order. In addition, the NTC also said that all provisional authorities and certificates of public convenience granted to ABS-CBN were also revoked and canceled.

=== Blocktime deals and partnership agreements ===
==== ZOE Broadcasting Network ====
On October 6, 2020, ABS-CBN Corporation announced a deal with ZOE Broadcasting Network to air ABS-CBN shows from its owned television network on Channel 11's A2Z (formerly ZOE TV) on October 10, after almost three years of speculated rumors. Alongside, the network would also air Light TV-produced programs, ZOE's content partners including CBN Asia and Trinity Broadcasting Network, and others including its blocktimers, licensors, and providers, similar to what GMA News TV (formerly QTV/Q and later GTV) has done before.

A month of launching of the said new channel, the NTC were reportedly to investigate ABS-CBN and ZOE Broadcasting Network if the said blocktime agreement of two stations are processed in legal ways.

==== Brightlight Productions, TV5, and Cignal TV ====
On January 18, 2021, the Philippine Star's entertainment columnist Ricky Lo reported that a possible partnership between ABS-CBN and its rival TV5 might happen very soon through its programming partner Cignal TV, which allowed ABS-CBN to air its programs on the rival network and its regional stations, aside from its existing agreement with ZOE Broadcasting Network (which only limited to Mega Manila area). The partnership become evident when ABS-CBN's flagship Sunday variety show ASAP, along with the FPJ: Da King movie block is reported to be carried on TV5 beginning January 24, replacing the Brightlight Productions blocktimers, namely Sunday Noontime Live!, I Got You and Sunday 'Kada (which were headlined by some ABS-CBN talents). Both ABS-CBN and TV5 later confirmed this move in collaboration with Brightlight Productions and Cignal TV on January 21, with a movie block FPJ: Da King starring Fernando Poe Jr. (now returned on GMA Network as FPJ sa GMA) also included in the Sunday's lineup.

According to TV5 Network and Cignal TV chairman Manuel V. Pangilinan on the addition of more ABS-CBN shows on the network, he said that for now it is "too early" to consider for a said expansion, that is until March 5 where ABS-CBN and TV5 confirmed that ABS-CBN's Primetime Bida shows carried on the said network on March 8. The airing of newly-produced ABS-CBN contents on TV5 went on hiatus on January 1, 2026 while retaining reruns of the former (Nag-aapoy Na Damdamin and Pira-Pirasong Paraiso) on the network. However after 5 months and 21 days hiatus on June 22, 2026, TV5 resumed airing new ABS-CBN contents with Primetime Bida's Sigabo and in exchange, TV5's longest running tabloid talk show Face to Face begin airing on ABS-CBN platforms starting June 29, 2026.

==== GMA Network ====
On April 5, 2022, executives of both GMA Network and ABS-CBN signed a contract to air Star Cinema movies on GMA.

On December 2022, both companies discussed a collaboration of a television series, casting their respective artists and the latter's production unit Dreamscape Entertainment developing the romantic drama series Unbreak My Heart.

On June 20, 2023, ABS-CBN Corporation and GMA Network extended their collaboration to broadcast noontime variety show It's Showtime on GTV starting July 1, 2023 (that only lasted until December 31, 2024), as well as its temporary replacement It's Your Lucky Day from October 14 to 28, 2023 due to the former's suspension. And on April 6, 2024, It's Showtime aired on GMA Network.

On January 28, 2025, ABS-CBN Studios, through Banijay Asia and GMA Network, Inc. announced a historic collaboration deal for the longest-running reality competition show Pinoy Big Brother in line for its 20th anniversary to produce seasons beginning with the Celebrity Collab Edition on the main channel, Kapuso Stream and all ABS-CBN platforms.

==== Prime Media Holdings and Philippine Collective Media Corporation ====
On May 23, 2023, ABS-CBN announced in a press release that the company will enter into a joint venture agreement with Prime Media Holdings, Inc, owned by House Speaker Representative Martin Romualdez. Among the plans for ABS-CBN and Prime Media joint venture is the possible revival of DZMM on its frequency 630 kHz. 630 kHz conducted a test broadcast on June 26, 2023 under the DWPM callsign, it had its soft launch on June 30 as Radyo 630 and officially launched on July 17 until the branding return of DZMM Radyo Patrol 630 since May 29, 2025 albeit retaining the DWPM legal callsign. The frequency is owned by Philippine Collective Media Corporation and operated by Media Serbisyo Production Corporation, a joint venture between Prime Media Holdings (through its indirect subsidiary Philippine Collective Media Corporation) and ABS-CBN Corporation.

On May 27, 2024, ABS-CBN and Prime Media Holdings announced that TeleRadyo Serbisyo (now DZMM TeleRadyo) programs along with TV Patrol and TV Patrol Weekend will be simulcasted on PRTV Prime Media.

==== Advanced Media Broadcasting System ====
On April 15, 2024, AMBS' All TV started its simulcast of Jeepney TV programs (which are mostly ABS-CBN program reruns under its former frequency), as well as the Kapamilya Channel broadcast feed, which marked ABS-CBN's return to channels 2 and 16 in Mega Manila and regional channels, under an agreement between Advanced Media Broadcasting System and ABS-CBN Corporation. Two years later on January 2, 2026, the latter entirely replaced Jeepney TV sa All TV block, thus marking the full-circle return of ABS-CBN programs as well as returning to its original broadcasting hours.

=== 2021 franchise approval initiatives ===
On December 8, 2020, Buhay Party-List Representative and Deputy Speaker Lito Atienza said that the approval of the ABS-CBN franchise might happen on 2021 under the House leadership of Lord Allan Velasco, as he assures the speaker to give some ample time to settle the franchise. On January 4, 2021, Senate President Tito Sotto filed a Senate Bill No. 1967 that seeks to grant ABS-CBN's franchise for another 25 years, with at least 16 senators backing its support for Sotto's bill. Later that day, Batangas 6th District Representative and Deputy Speaker Vilma Santos-Recto, one of the 11 representatives who voted in favor of the franchise on July 10, 2020, said that she will refile her same franchise bill in the House, which Santos-Recto filed a House Bill No. 8298 on January 18. However, SAGIP Party-List Representative Rodante Marcoleta, one of the 70 representatives who voted against the franchise on July 10, 2020, and the host of Net 25's public affairs program, Sa Ganang Mamamayan (lit. For Citizens), reiterated that "major changes are needed" for the network to be able to regain its franchise.

On February 9, 2021, during his public address and an IATF meeting over government-owned People's Television Network, Duterte said that he will not allow ABS-CBN to operate, even if a franchise was given to them by Congress until they settle their taxes. The following day, Presidential Spokesperson Harry Roque, in his Malacañang virtual press briefing, said that Duterte would leave it to the Office of the Ombudsman to investigate ABS-CBN over alleged unpaid taxes and condonation of the network's soured loans.

On February 11, 2021, House Speaker Lord Allan Velasco said that ABS-CBN's franchise renewal will have to wait until 2022.

=== Frequency reassignment ===
On July 26, 2021, during Duterte's State of the Nation Address, Duterte intended to reassign the former frequencies of ABS-CBN to different companies.

==== Television ====
On January 5, 2022, Advanced Media Broadcasting System (which airs its flagship TV station All TV), backed by the Villar Group through Planet Cable, was awarded a provisional authority license for the Channel 2 analog frequency and its digital counterpart Channel 16 frequency by the National Telecommunications Commission. On January 26, Channel 23 (DWAC-TV's frequency), was awarded to RPN's sister company Aliw Broadcasting Corporation (as IZTV on May 9, 2022 and now Aliw 23 on January 30, 2023) and Channel 43 was awarded to Sonshine Media Network International, which eventually also shut down its free-to-air operations in early 2024 due to a cease-and-desist order (prior to CDO, NTC issued a 30-day suspension order against SMNI following the latter's multiple franchise violation).

In 2024, most former ABS-CBN regional analog and digital TV stations were later acquired by Advanced Media Broadcasting System via provisional authority for the expansion of All TV's free TV broadcast.

==== Radio (FM and AM) ====
In 2021, DYEA 99.7 in Palawan was awarded to Bandera News Philippines as Radyo Bandera 99.7. On the other hand in the same year, DWEC 94.3 in Dagupan and DYMC 91.1 in Iloilo were awarded to Philippine Collective Media Corporation as FM Favorite Music Radio in Baguio and in Bacolod.

On March 29, 2023, DWRR-FM 101.9 in Metro Manila was awarded to Christian Bible Baptist Church as The Anchor 101.9 in San Pedro, Laguna.

On April 24, 2023, DXRR-FM 101.1 in Davao City was awarded to Berean Bible Baptist Church of Ecoland as 101.1 Anchor Radio. However on October 2025, it moves it operations to DXMX-FM 105.9.

On May 23, 2023, 630 KHz in Metro Manila was awarded to Philippine Collective Media Corporation as DWPM Radyo 630, being conjointly operated by Media Serbisyo Production Corporation, a joint venture between Prime Media Holdings (through subsidiary Philippine Collective Media Corporation) and ABS-CBN Corporation. However, on May 29, 2025 at 8:00 PM, it reverted back to its previous branding, DZMM Radyo Patrol 630 along with the re-branding return of its television counterpart as DZMM TeleRadyo after 5 years, albeit retaining its legal callsign DWPM, as well as its current joint venture between ABS-CBN and Prime Media and its ownership, Philippine Collective Media Corporation.

On December 2024, DXEC 91.9 FM in Cagayan de Oro was awarded to Archdiocese of Cagayan de Oro as 91.9 Marian Radio which was formerly aired on 103.9 FM from 2017 to 2024.

In 2025, DYOO 101.5 FM in Bacolod was awarded to 5K Broadcasting Network as 101.5 K5 News FM which was formerly aired on 103.9 FM.

=== House of Representatives briefing on the ABS-CBN/TV5 deal and cancellation ===
On August 16, 2022, the House of Representatives has originally set a briefing on the investment of ABS-CBN in TV5 on August 18, however the briefing silently announced its cancellation on the following day that was scheduled to happen on that day. Rodante Marcoleta commented on the deal.

=== 2025 franchise approval initiatives ===
In January 2025, Albay Representative Joey Salceda filed House Bill 11252, the fifth bill that seeks to grant ABS-CBN's television and radio broadcasting franchise for another 25 years. On January 14, 2025, the bill has passed the first reading. However, in June 2025, ABS-CBN officially decided not to pursue a congressional franchise to return to traditional broadcasting, despite a potential Congress award of a franchise. Instead, ABS-CBN will focus on content creation, partnerships and global expansions.

== Reactions and aftermath ==
=== Prior to shutdown ===
Before the expiration of the broadcast franchise, ABS-CBN talents and employees conducted weekly demonstrations in front of its headquarters in Quezon City as well as in its regional stations from January to February 2020. During these demonstrations, presidential daughter and incumbent Davao City mayor Sara Duterte expressed support for the franchise renewal.

=== After broadcast stoppage ===
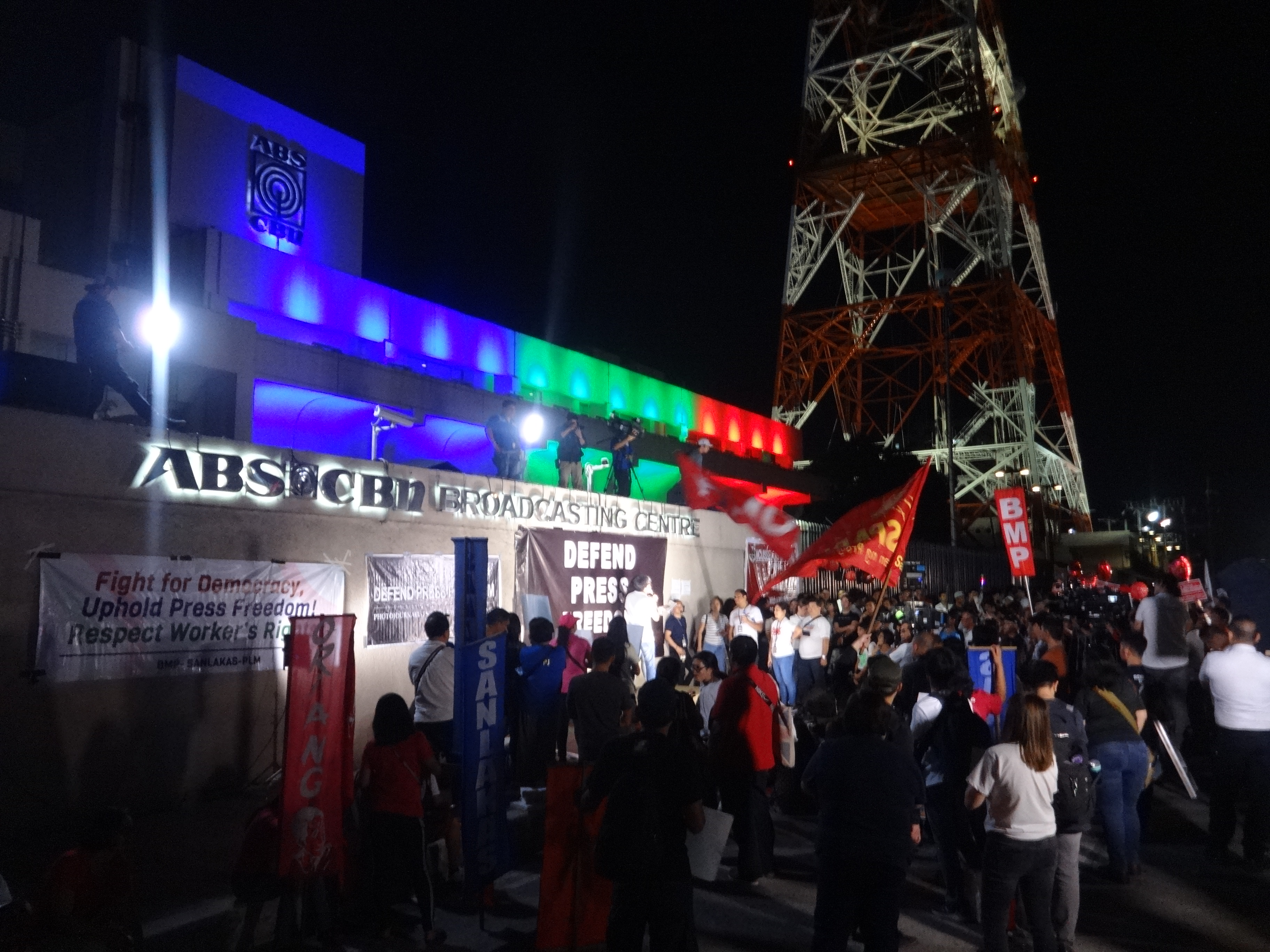
Supporters of ABS-CBN staging a rally outside the ABS-CBN Broadcasting Center on the night of June 3, 2020.

The NTC's cease and desist order on ABS-CBN was met by widespread criticism by the Kapisanan ng mga Brodkaster ng Pilipinas (KBP) (the network being one of its members), as well as various advocacy groups, business organizations, the Philippine Catholic church, and even some members of the Congress. Several journalists and celebrities from the network and its rival GMA Network expressed solidarity with ABS-CBN after it was ordered to cease its radio and TV broadcast. In addition, former president Benigno Aquino III criticized the shutdown of ABS-CBN, stating that Duterte and his administration made their own "unnecessary problem". The hashtag #NoToABSCBNShutDown topped the local and worldwide Twitter trending lists the same day.

Within a day, numerous colleges and universities in the Philippines, including the UPLB College of Development Communication, Ateneo de Manila University and its Communication Department, the University of Santo Tomas, St. Scholastica's College and its Mass Communication Department, De La Salle University, and the UP Diliman College of Mass Communication released statements supporting the franchise renewal of ABS-CBN.

The network's shutdown was noted to have placed the job security of 11,000 ABS-CBN employees in jeopardy during the COVID-19 pandemic, though the company assured them a stable salary, as well as a complete health and financial benefits for the next two months following the shutdown. In response, the government may give a 2-month aid to the employees of ABS-CBN.

GMA Network's shares increased by 24% as the Philippine Stock Exchange voluntarily suspended ABS-CBN's trading. However, investors remained cautious about GMA's stock rally due to the effects of the shutdown on business confidence.

Duterte denied involvement with the network's shutdown, despite earlier assertions that he would oppose its franchise renewal. His spokesman, Harry Roque, also thanked the network for its assistance to the country during the COVID-19 pandemic. According to Roque, Duterte could not mark the bill renewing ABS-CBN's franchise as urgent as it would involve private interest and that Duterte would be neutral to the renewal.

On May 5, 2020, GMA Network's primetime news program 24 Oras, interviewed the Federation of International Cable TV and Telecommunications Association of the Philippines (FICTAP) President Estrellita Juliano Tamano, who claimed that ABS-CBN violated their 1995 legislative broadcast by airing six channels. She argued that ABS-CBN should be instead broadcasting in one channel only and instead file for a new franchise for each channel they broadcast.

On May 7, 2020, Philippine Cable and Telecommunications Association Inc (PCTA) President Ronaldo Manlapig argued that there is no need to file for a separate franchise for each channel as ABS-CBN uses digital transmission for their frequency, despite the multiple channels.

Public criticism in the early days after the shutdown revolved around the NTC, for lack of fairness on the agency's cease and desist order on the network, and Congress – especially the lower house – for inaction to pass the franchise renewal bill.

ABS-CBN's shutdown received international attention as news websites, magazines, newspapers, and broadcasters from around the world published stories on the network's shutdown. (Note: These include: The New York Times; The Washington Post; Variety; Deadline Hollywood; BBC News; CBS News; Time; Al Jazeera; CNN (not to be confused with CNN Philippines); The Guardian; Associated Press; ABC News Australia (not to be confused with the American news organization of the same name); NHK; KBS; Yonhap News Agency; Financial Times; CNA; The Straits Times (not to be confused with the former sister publication in Malaysia which sharing the same name); Among various others.)

The discontinuation of ABS-CBN's terrestrial broadcast operations created difficulties during the onslaught of Typhoon Vongfong (Ambo), when authorities and residents of some distant provinces, including Aurora, Quezon, and Sorsogon, reported being unable to get updated information about the typhoon from other sources because ABS-CBN was the only national television station whose signal could reach them, and mobile internet signal reception of good quality was hard to get in their area. Being that the income of much of the population in these areas belong to lower tiers, it could be safely assumed that there was barely if any fixed wired internet service (be it Dial-up through conventional telephone lines, cable internet or optic fiber) to these areas before weather conditions deteriorated.

On June 4, 2020, it was announced that Kapamilya Channel would air programs from ABS-CBN such as Ang Probinsyano, It's Showtime and ASAP Natin 'To beginning June 13, 2020, on cable and satellite TV providers nationwide.

=== After the committee vote ===
Some members of Congress expressed dismay over the decision, including Cagayan de Oro Rep. Rufus Rodriguez, who called the denial "defying evidence". Progressive and sectoral groups in the Philippines such as Akbayan, Kilusang Magbubukid ng Pilipinas, and Pamalakaya also slammed the body for the vote. However, on July 13, 2020, Speaker Alan Peter Cayetano stood by the decision to deny the network its franchise.

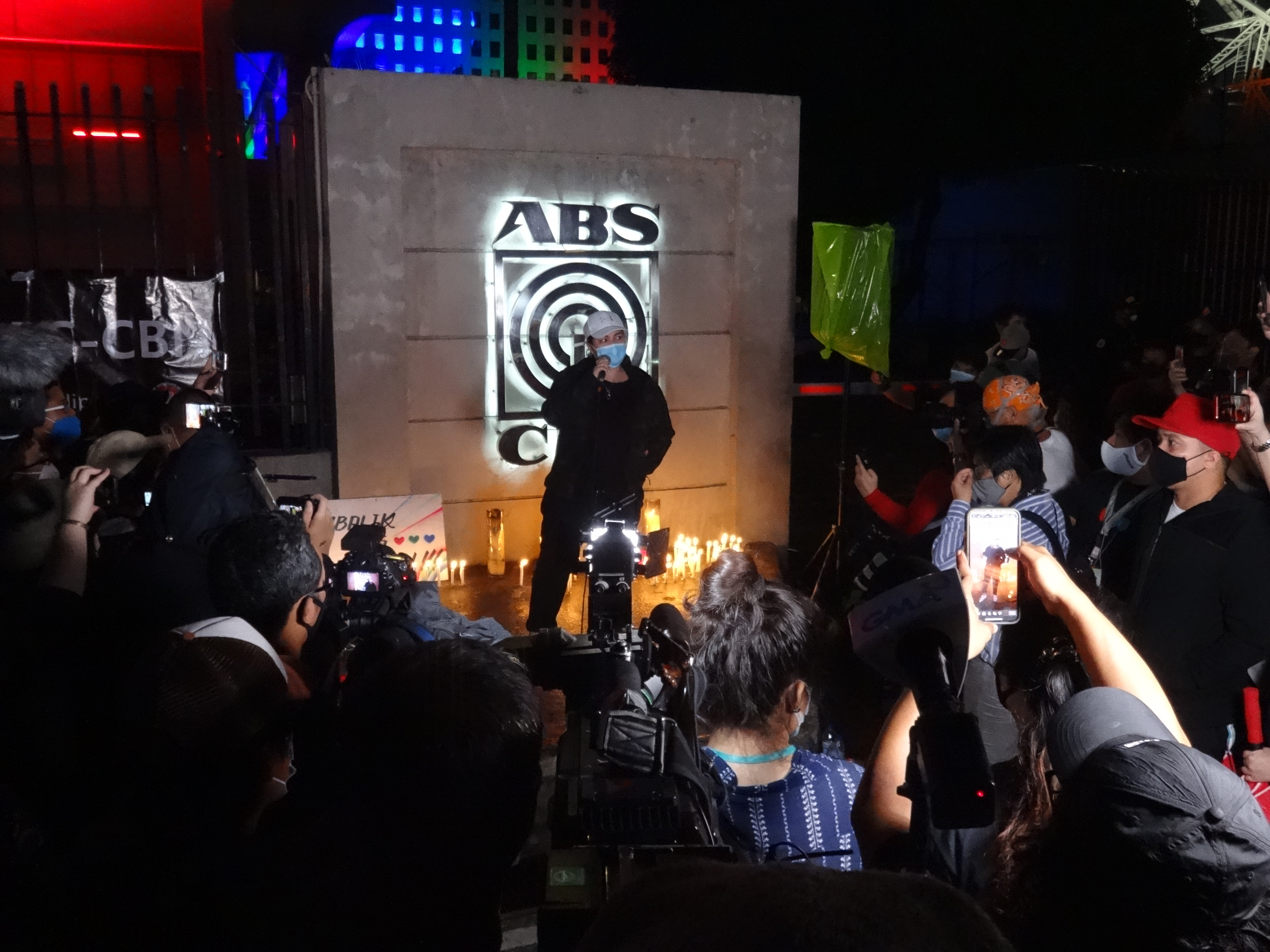
Supporters conducting a nightly noise barrage in front of the ABS-CBN headquarters, with ABS-CBN artist Angel Locsin speaking in front

From July 11 until the end of the month, supporters organized a nightly noise barrage in front of the ABS-CBN studios in Quezon City in opposition to the verdict. Other similarly styled demonstrations were held in front of respective ABS-CBN stations in Davao City, Bacolod, and Naga, Camarines Sur. On July 26, demonstrations in Cagayan de Oro were marred after three funeral wreaths containing ribbons glorifying unidentified individuals left the New People's Army in front of the ABS-CBN station in the city. National Union of Journalists of the Philippines Western Mindanao Safety Officer JB Deveza called such action "a form of death threat" aimed to intimidate the network employees, and the action appeared to be a part of a coordinated red-tagging operation.

On July 16, a movement named People's Initiative for Reforms and Movement for Action (PIRMA), an independent and organic collective of concerned Filipinos moving to advance reforms via people's initiative and referendum launched a signature campaign called "PIRMA Kapamilya" that aims to grant ABS-CBN a people's franchise via democratic experiment of a people's initiative. The signature campaign started on July 25 and aimed to gather 7 million signatures nationwide (3% of registered voters in each legislative district and at least 10% of total registered voters) as a requirement for the COMELEC to call for a referendum on the franchise.

In a related manner, Kantar Media Philippines (ABS-CBN's main client and partner) originally announced the closure of its television ratings service by the end of 2020 due to the COVID-19 pandemic and the broadcast stoppage of ABS-CBN, however, the decision was reversed following the block time deal between ABS-CBN and ZOE, as well as retaining the majority of its existing staff.

In a related manner, boxing promotion company ALA Promotions (promoted the Pinoy Pride series of bouts aired on ABS-CBN and its sister network, S+A) announced its closure on August 18, 2020, due to the COVID-19 pandemic and the broadcast stoppage of ABS-CBN, while its gym division ALA Gym remained operational.

=== Cessations and retrenchments ===
On July 15, 2020, ABS-CBN released a statement in light of the denial of the franchise that it would lay off a number of its workers and close down some of its business operations effective August 31. As of December 15, 2022, there were about 5,955 employees and workers that were displaced, retrenched, or laid off by the company itself, according to the Department of Labor and Employment (Philippines).

According to a town-hall meeting called by management hours before the release of the statement, among the first entities bound to close were:

- all MOR Philippines terrestrial radio stations including its flagship, MOR 101.9 in Manila. After the said date, MOR eventually consolidated its programming to different new media (online) skeletal stations including Manila, Baguio, Cagayan de Oro, Cebu and Davao.
- the ABS-CBN Film Archives and its film restoration program. This led to the ABS-CBN Film Restoration Project rushing to complete the restoration of the 1984 film Soltero before the retrenchment date, with its retrenchment begun on August 31 and closure on March 31, 2025.
- ABS-CBN Regional, with the 12 regional editions of TV Patrol and their 10 respective provincial morning programs ending their broadcasts on August 28. After the said date, its regional news bureaus remained open in different areas including Baguio, Cagayan de Oro, Cebu City and Davao City.
  It was eventually revived in January 2025 via A2Z Regional and on November 2, 2025 with the return of TV Patrol Regional.
- the current affairs and documentary divisions of the ABS-CBN News and Current Affairs, tasked for programs such as Mission Possible (now Julius Babao Unplugged on TV5 and One PH), My Puhunan (now My Puhunan: Kaya Mo! on A2Z, All TV and Kapamilya Channel), Matanglawin (later Dami Mong Alam, Kuya Kim! on GMA Network), S.O.C.O.: Scene of the Crime Operatives (later returned on October 24, 2025 on iWant and on January 17, 2026 on A2Z, All TV and Kapamilya Channel), Kuha Mo! (later Kuha All! on All TV), Failon Ngayon (now Think About It on RPTV) and Rated K (now Rated Korina on A2Z, All TV, Kapamilya Channel and TV5), resulted to being unceremoniously cancelled.
  It was eventually revived around 2022 with the premiere of KBYN: Kaagapay ng Bayan.
- the comedy division of the ABS-CBN Entertainment, tasked for shows such as Home Sweetie Home (later Happy Together on GMA Network) and Banana Sundae (later Sunday 'Kada on TV5), resulted to being unceremoniously cancelled.
  It eventually revived around 2024 with the return of Goin' Bulilit after a nearly five-year hiatus.

Other company divisions that announced their respective dissolution and reduction of workforces before or beyond the July 15 announcement and the August 31 deadline would take effect, unless otherwise noted, were:

- ACJ O Shopping Corporation (joint venture between ABS-CBN and CJ ENM O Shopping Division that owned O Shopping) on July 8, with its retrenchment begun on August 7 and closure on November 1, only retaining its online portal until November 15.
- ABS-CBN Sports and ABS-CBN University on July 16. The closure of the sports division left the broadcast contracts of collegiate leagues such as the University Athletic Association of the Philippines (UAAP; now with One Sports) and National Collegiate Athletic Association (NCAA; now with One Sports), the now-professional Maharlika Pilipinas Basketball League (MPBL; now with Solar Sports) and the Premier Volleyball League (PVL; now with One Sports) in jeopardy.
- Creative Communication Management (CCM) division on July 18, reducing its workforce from a high of over 170 creatives to a group of 20 on August 31.
- ABS-CBN Digital Media's owned platform One Music PH on July 20, but later revived in August 2021.
- KidZania Manila (owned 73% by ABS-CBN Theme Parks & Resorts and operated by Play Innovations, Inc.) on July 22, with its closure on August 31.
  As of 2025, the establishment is currently occupied by The Street at BGC, owned by MCC Space Development Inc. located at Park Triangle in Bonifacio Global City, Taguig City.
- ABS-CBN Tulong Center on July 29, with its closure on August 1.
- ABS-CBN's executive dining restaurant Restaurant 9501 and lifestyle website Chalk.ph on August 8.
- the company's loyalty freebies program Kapamilya, Thank You! on August 15.
- Others including ABS-CBN Studio Tours, ABS-CBN Store, ABS-CBN Studio Experience at Trinoma, Hado Pilipinas, and multi-channel network Adober Studios on August 28.
  As of 2023, ABS-CBN Studio Experience is currently occupied by the expansion of Timezone located at the 4th Level of Trinoma. On the other hand, ABS-CBN Store was revived on June 27, 2024.

== Long-term effects ==
=== Information barriers during various typhoons ===
The ABS-CBN shutdown was attributed to information gaps during the media coverage of typhoons that occurred since November 2020, particularly Super Typhoon Rolly, Typhoon Ulysses, and Super Typhoon Odette, with reports noting the void left by the closure of its provincial news bureaus and lack of a substantial signal reach in provinces far from Manila.

Presidential spokesperson Harry Roque, however, disagreed with netizens claiming that the shutdown of ABS-CBN exposed "information gaps" in calamities such as Super Typhoon Rolly. Responding to a question, Roque said both private and government media are doing their best in providing news updates to keep the public informed. Roque also vehemently refuted the claim of Vice President Leni Robredo that the absence of ABS-CBN's regional unit left some residents in the dark. Roque said his team has been holding public briefings to update Filipinos about the national situation amid recent calamities.

=== "Chilling effect" ===
Media experts noted that the shutdown of ABS-CBN had a chilling effect on newsrooms in the country. Journalism professor Rolando Tolentino defines "chilling effect" as the discouragement of free speech and other legal rights via legal sanction. According to the Center for Media Freedom and Responsibility, after the shutdown, fear had taken over some newsrooms resulting in reluctance to do investigative reports. Journalism professor Danilo Arao said the chilling effect caused coverage by some media outlets to become skewed to favor the President Duterte administration and its supporters.

== See also ==
- Mass media in the Philippines
- Television in the Philippines
- 1972 Martial law under Ferdinand Marcos – an era in Philippine history that forced the first shutdown of ABS-CBN until 1986, despite it being lifted five years prior.
- Manila Chronicle – A newspaper in the Philippines and ABS-CBN's sister company that has been forcefully closed down by the government.
