= DYEA =

Radyo Bandera Española (DYEA)
- Sofronio Española; Philippines
- Broadcast area: Southern Palawan
- Frequency: 99.7 MHz
- Branding: 99.7 Radyo Bandera

Programming
- Format: Contemporary MOR, News, Talk
- Affiliations: Radyo Bandera

Ownership
- Owner: Bandera News Philippines; (Palawan Broadcasting Corporation)

History
- First air date: 2011
- Former names: MOR 99.7 (2011–2017)
- Call sign meaning: Española

Technical information
- Power: 5,000 watts
- ERP: 25,000 watts

99.7 Radyo Bandera (DYEA 99.7 MHz) is an FM station owned and operated by Bandera News Philippines. Its studio and transmitter are located in Brgy. Pulot Center, Sofronio Española, Palawan

== History ==
The station was inaugurated in 2011 as MOR 99.7 For Life! under the ownership of ABS-CBN Corporation. It had a shared coverage with another network-owned FM station in Puerto Princesa that reached the southern part of the said mentioned area due to its location. The station went off the air in 2017.

In 2021, it went back on the air, this time under the Radyo Bandera network of Bandera News Philippines. It moved to its current home in Brgy. Pulok Center.
