= DYTC-FM =

Defunct radio station in Tacloban, Philippines

DYTC
- Tacloban; Philippines
- Frequency: 94.3 MHz

Programming
- Format: Silent

Ownership
- Owner: ABS-CBN Corporation

History
- First air date: 1993
- Last air date: May 5, 2020 (broadcast franchise lapsed/expired)
- Former call signs: DYAB-FM (1993–1995)
- Former names: Radio Romance (1993-1997); ABS-CBN Radio (1997-1998); ProStar (1998-1999); TC 94.3 (1999-2001); My Only Radio (2001-2020)

Technical information
- Licensing authority: NTC

MOR 94.3 Tacloban Final logo 2018 to 2020.

DYTC (94.3 FM) was a Filipino radio station in owned and operated by ABS-CBN Corporation. Its studio and transmitter were located at 5th Floor, Uytingkoc Bldg., Avenida Veteranos St., Tacloban.

== History ==
The station was inaugurated in 1993 as ABS-CBN Radio Romance under the callsign DYAB-FM, followed by launching of DYAB-TV (since 1988). In 1995, it was renamed to ABS-CBN Star Radio following the callsign changed to DYTC earlier. In 1997, it renamed as ABS-CBN Radio after all regional stations we're renamed to avoid confusion with Star FM. A year later, it was renamed as Prostar, along with selected regional stations. In 1999, it renamed again as ABS-CBN For Life (with the on screen as TC 94.3), along with all ABS-CBN Radio and ProStar regional stations being renamed to the branding. In 2001, all of ABS-CBN and Prostar radio stations renamed as MOR (My Only Radio). It become No. 1 in Tacloban due to its positive feedback and comments.

Amid the Typhoon Haiyan (Yolanda) last November 8, 2013, the station simulcasted the radio programs of DZMM Radyo Patrol 630 via satellite from Manila to provide news updates and public service for the survivors of the calamity since many homes in Leyte have no electricity brought about by the typhoon. Since then, it aired a simulcast of TV Patrol Eastern Visayas. (formerly TV Patrol Tacloban)

On May 5, 2020, the station, along with the other MOR stations, went off the air due to the cease and desist order of the National Telecommunications Commission following the ABS-CBN franchise renewal controversy.
