= Arrest of Apollo Quiboloy =

2024 standoff in Davao City, Philippines

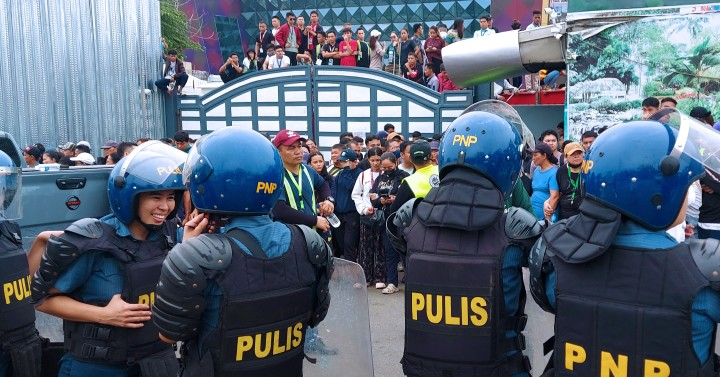
- Philippine National Police units surround the Kingdom of Jesus Christ (KOJC) compound in Davao City on June 10, 2024, to serve arrest warrants against Apollo Quiboloy.
- Date: August 24 – September 8, 2024 (2 weeks and 1 day)
- Location: Catitipan, Buhangin, Davao City, Philippines; 7°08′00″N 125°38′42″E
- Caused by: Attempts to serve arrest warrant by the Philippine National Police and Senate on Kingdom of Jesus Christ (KOJC) founder and leader Apollo Quiboloy on charges of sexual abuse; Perceived state abuse by President Bongbong Marcos and government agencies by members of KOJC
- Goals: Arrest of: Apollo Quiboloy; Cresente Canada; Ingrid Canada; Sylvia Cemañes; Jackielyn Roy
- Result: Several KOJC properties within Davao City raided by police since June; Forced entry of police inside the main KOJC compound; Protest rally by members of KOJC; Clashes between police and members of KOJC; Arrest of Quiboloy and his co-accused

Parties
Philippine government: National Bureau of Investigation; Department of the Interior and Local Government; Philippine National Police; Armed Forces of the Philippines	Kingdom of Jesus Christ

Lead figures
Bongbong Marcos (President); Benhur Abalos (Interior Secretary); Rommel Marbil (PNP Chief); Nicolas Torre III (PNP); Luis Rex Bergante (AFP)	Apollo Quiboloy; Israelito Torreon; Sebastian Duterte (Davao City Mayor); Sara Duterte (Vice President); Ronald Dela Rosa (Senator); Robin Padilla (Senator); Bong Go (Senator)

Number
PNP: 2,000–3,000 policemen AFP: 400–1,000 Army soldiers	1,000–5,000 KOJC members

Casualties and losses
60 police officers wounded	1 reported dead 54 members hospitalized 29 arrested
- Location within Mindanao mainland Location within Philippines

On August 24, 2024, a standoff began at the Kingdom of Jesus Christ (KOJC) compound in Catitipan, Buhangin, Davao City, Philippines, as the Philippine National Police (PNP) attempted to serve an arrest warrant against Apollo Quiboloy, the founder and leader of the KOJC, on charges of sexual misconduct. Four other associates, namely Cresente Canada, Ingrid Canada, Sylvia Cemañes, and Jackielyn Roy, were also included in the arrest warrant on charges of child abuse. Quiboloy had hidden himself and other associates within the premises of the KOJC compound, where the KJC King Dome and Jose Maria College are located. Members of the KOJC gathered that same night to express solidarity with Quiboloy and protest the attempts to arrest him. The police operation was headed by Nicolas Torre III, the PNP regional head of Davao. By September 8, 2024, Quiboloy was arrested by the authorities at the ACQ College of Ministries within the compound after two weeks in hiding, and was then transferred to Manila to face trial.

The standoff resulted in clashes, leading to several wounded on both sides. Within the first 24 hours of the raid, one KOJC member died from a heart attack. Former president Rodrigo Duterte and incumbent vice president Sara Duterte expressed negative sentiments toward the raid, with the latter attending a KOJC-organized event within the compound and separately suggesting that the PNP's "extraordinary" actions were political in nature. Police authorities, however, said that the PNP was simply serving an arrest warrant, with the large number of policemen serving to cover the vast area of the compound to search for Quiboloy. The Commission on Human Rights monitored the situation in the compound throughout the raid.

== Background ==
Apollo Quiboloy founded the Restorationist Christian denomination Kingdom of Jesus Christ on September 1, 1985, in Davao City, naming himself its Executive Pastor and claiming to be the "Appointed Son of God". Since then, the congregation has grown into a global religious organization, claiming as many as 6 million members and adherents worldwide; police authorities, however, stated that the organization likely only had around 8,000 members scattered around 21 countries based on interviews they conducted.

On November 10, 2021, Quiboloy, along with other members of the KOJC, were indicted by a federal grand jury in California, United States, for alleged sexual misconduct involving minors, human trafficking, and fraud. A previous indictment in 2020 had covered other defendants, but had not included Quiboloy, who was added in the 2021 indictment along with five other new defendants who were not included in the prior indictment. The Federal Bureau of Investigation led the investigation of the case and designated Quiboloy as a wanted suspect for sex abuse and human trafficking.

== Events ==
=== Prior events ===
==== Actions by the judiciary and the police ====
Quiboloy had been charged with alleged child and sexual abuse under Republic Act No. 7610—both previously dismissed by a Davao City court in 2020 but later refiled; and qualified human trafficking under RA No. 9208, as amended before the Pasig Regional Trial Court (RTC). On May 28, the Supreme Court granted the request of the Department of Justice (DOJ) for the transfer of cases against Quiboloy from Davao City to Quezon City. Cresente, Paulene, and Ingrid Canada, Jackielyn Roy, and Sylvia Cemañes had been charged as well.

On April 26, the Philippine National Police (PNP) confirmed the revocation of the firearms licenses of Quiboloy. Cresente Canada later surrendered at least 21 firearms to the PNP on May 27.

On August 8, the Court of Appeals, granting the petition filed by the Anti–Money Laundering Council, ordered the freezing of Quiboloy's assets, which included the bank accounts of himself, the KOJC, and the Swara Sug Media Corporation.

==== Arrest warrants against Quiboloy, et al. ====
Arrest warrants against Quiboloy and five associates were issued by the Davao City RTC Branch 12 and by a Pasig court. The former was served in April at the KOJC compound in Davao City. All co-accused either were arrested or surrendered to authorities, but later released on bail.. in March, Quiboloy was ordered arrested by the Senate for his refusal to attend the hearings, and went into hiding thereafter.

Former president Rodrigo Duterte, Quiboloy's close ally and KOJC property administrator, advised him to "just get yourself arrested" or risk facing arrest. In April, Quiboloy, through an audio recording, stated he refused to be caught alive and alleged an assassination plot against him by the Philippine and United States governments.

==== June 10 raids and subsequent events ====
On June 10, in a coordinated yet failed effort by the security forces for the arrests, five properties in Davao City, Island Garden City of Samal, and Malungon, Sarangani, were raided, causing the beginning of tensions between the PNP and the KOJC. In Davao, joint forces of the PNP – Special Action Force (PNP–SAF) and the Criminal Investigation and Detection Group (CIDG), consisting of around 100 police officers, stormed the KOJC compound in Buhangin District, facing members who protested against the operation. One KOJC member died from heart attack during the raid. The operation was condemned by former president Duterte.

On July 8, Interior Secretary Benhur Abalos offered a ₱10-million reward for information leading to Quiboloy's arrest. A lower reward was given as well for the five co-accused. Three days later, Paulene Canada was arrested at her residence in Davao City. President Bongbong Marcos later challenged Quiboloy to appear and face his accusations.

A few days before the raid, Police Regional Office – Region XI (Davao Region) director Brigadier General Nicolas Torre III told the Senate that authorities were allowed to pursue the search, as a Pasig court issued an alias warrant of arrest against Quiboloy. He later stated the police's willingness to serve arrest without any casualty if Quiboloy surrendered.

=== Police operation and standoff ===
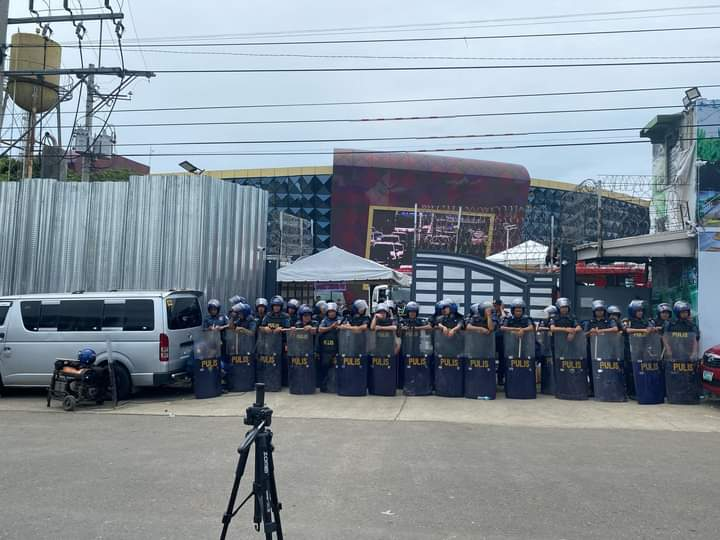
Philippine police at the gate of Kingdom of Jesus Christ Compound.

At 4:00 a.m. of August 24, a composite police team, led by regional police chief Torre and composed of 2,000 personnel from Regions XI, XII and XIII, initiated another search in the KOJC compound in an attempt to arrest Quiboloy and four others. They reportedly entered the compound after negotiations with Israelito Torreon, Quiboloy's legal counsel. Torre said that based on information from their informants, the subject's movements inside the compound are well-planned, making the search difficult. He also said the police familiarized first with the property for future searches. The 30-hectare compound, situated near Francisco Bangoy International Airport, has a complex infrastructure that includes underground facilities along with 42 buildings.

The operation caused heightened tensions, with some members reportedly affected by tear gas. Several were hospitalized, apparently due to trauma; at least sixteen others, including four children, reportedly fainted. Edwin E. Cababat, A male church member who, according to PNP–Davao Region, had been manning a watchtower at the back of the compound for days without sleep, suffered cardiac arrest. He was shortly pronounced dead on arrival at the Southern Philippines Medical Center. Torreon said that the group searched the property at least thrice, and the KOJC's school, the Jose Maria College, seven times, but with no results.

Police later set up a roadblock outside the compound. According to Senator Ronald dela Rosa, who then visited the area, the police detected a "heartbeat" underground using a specialized detector. At night, upon Torre's order for further searches, another contingent of police officers entered the premises.

On the evening of August 25, KOJC members and Quiboloy's supporters gathered in front of the compound to protest the police search. They set up a barricade at the Carlos P. Garcia National Highway, blocking a portion of the road and hampered access to nearby airport; and burned tires in retaliation to the police's alleged use of tear gas against them. Before 3:00 p.m. the following day, the police gave them an ultimatum to disperse peacefully to open the road to motorists, but the group refused. This resulted in a violent confrontation, ending with the arrest of 18 KOJC members who were charged with obstruction of justice.

On August 27, the Davao RTC Branch 15 issued a temporary protection order to the KOJC, directing the PNP to cease actions that threatening the KOJC members' safety and security, and instructing the removal of all obstructions of access to and from the compound. Interior Secretary Abalos said that the police search would continue to serve the warrant in the premises. The following day, the court issued a clarificatory order, noting that the TPO validates the processes related to the warrants. In the afternoon of the same day, the DOJ issued a statement saying the police operations are legal. Exactly a week later, the Court of Appeals 22nd Division in Cagayan de Oro promulgated a resolution nullifying the TPO, stating that the Davao City court acted without authority on the petition for writ of amparo.

On August 27, PNP Public Information Office Chief and spokesperson PCol. Jean Fajardo admitted that due to the large size of the compound and the lack of a blueprint to guide the police, it is likely they had yet to cover half of the compound's total area. According to CNN, 2,000 police officers were still searching the compound.

On August 30, Vice President Sara Duterte visited the wake of KOJC member Edwin E. Cababat who died from a heart attack while manning a watchtower during the first day of the standoff.

On September 1, the KOJC organized an event at the compound commemorating its 39th anniversary, with Vice President Sara Duterte attending the event and expressing her support for the church while repeating her apology to them for her endorsement of Marcos in the 2022 Philippine presidential election.

On September 3, Torreon, along with members of the media, attempted to enter the JMC basement and the KOJC cathedral for inspection but were barred by the police. The KOJC legal counsel noted alleged digging activities in the basement and that the cathedral was designated as an advanced command post. On September 5, they reported the significant decrease of the regional police personnel, some having been pulled out from the compound a day prior to the Senate hearing and inspection of the property. Police were reportedly seen smuggling in cement and cleaning up the area, with damaged glass panes evident.

On September 8, Abalos announced in a brief Facebook post that Quiboloy was captured, thus ending the manhunt inside the KOJC property. Torreon stated Quiboloy voluntarily surrendered to spare his followers from violence, to which President Marcos acknowledged Quiboloy as displaying "a modicum of leadership". The police officers in the area were eventually pulled out. The PNP later said that Quiboloy, as well as his four aides, surrendered to the Intelligence Service of the Armed Forces of the Philippines (ISAFP), four hours after being given a PNP-issued 24-hour ultimatum, as negotiations for their surrender had begun at 1:30 p.m. They were taken to Metro Manila and are currently detained at PNP headquarters in Camp Crame, Quezon City.

Later in an exclusive interview, Davao del Norte Governor Edwin Jubahib said he helped to facilitate negotiations for the surrender of Quiboloy, with dialogues between the camp of KOJC and the ISAFP having been conducted around seven times in Davao City since August 30.

President Marcos reported that Quiboloy requested the military presence during his arrest in the compound, adding that that the augmentation from the AFP is common. A source from ABS-CBN News said Quiboloy was seen inside the ACQ building, also known as the Bible School Building, as early as September 6, and hid until his surrender.

Overall, more than a hundred people were hurt in the standoff. Sixty police officers were reportedly injured, while Torreon claimed at least 54 church members were hospitalized for injuries or heart and anxiety attacks. Also, throughout the raid, complaints were filed by the police against 29 male KOJC members, including an unspecified number of students, all arrested at the barricade. Each faced up to three separate complaints, which included obstruction of justice, violation of the public assembly law, and assaulting authorities. They were released on bail shortly after.

== Reactions ==
The PNP–Davao Region has defended their operation as legitimate. However, the legal counsel of KOJC (Israelito Torreon and Ferdinand Topacio) have criticized their actions, asserting that the operation being done by the PNP was illegal. Torreon claimed that instead of a court-issued search warrant, the police only presented an alias arrest warrant which had been served earlier that month by the National Bureau of Investigation. Some KOJC members later filed a complaint against the police over sustained injuries that occurred during the August 24 operation.

KOJC lawyers also planned to file countercharges against the police in connection with the August 26 incident.The lawyers also planned to file charges against the police for impounding the fire truck owned by the church's fast-food store which, as the regional police revealed, was used to block the highway during a prayer rally at the first day of standoff. The police also impounded another fire truck and two more vehicles during the operation.

On August 26, former presidential spokesperson Harry Roque and KOJC supporters held an indignation rally at Liwasang Bonifacio in Manila, calling for the resignation of President Marcos from public office. The operation was also criticized by the Duterte family, where Quiboloy is among their known supporters. Former president Rodrigo and his daughter, vice president Sara, both accused the Marcos administration of sowing "fear and terror." The vice president's brother, Davao City mayor Sebastian Duterte, criticized the police's usage of excessive force, which the vice president suspected as politically motivated. The vice president, in her statement, expressed regret for encouraging KOJC members to vote Marcos in 2022. KOJC had previously supported the candidacies of Marcos and Duterte in these elections.

On September 4, President Marcos, responding to the condition set by the Quiboloy camp that the latter would surface if there was a "written declaration" against turning him over to the United States for "extraordinary rendition," described this as "immaterial", saying that it should be presented to the courts. Marcos also said that it is vice president Duterte's right to apologize for endorsing his presidential bid, adding that he has not spoken to her since the latter's resignation from his Cabinet. Upon Quiboloy's arrest, Marcos commended the PNP for the operation, assuring of transparent and lawful due process, and that there would be no special treatment to him.

Senator dela Rosa initially urged Quiboloy to surrender "because there is really a court-issued warrant", and emphasized the need for resolution. In his privilege speech a week later, however, he called on President Marcos to order the withdrawal of police officers at the KOJC compound, saying that the church's religious freedom and JMC students' academic rights had been affected. Senator Imee Marcos condemned the "excessive show of force", citing a large number of police personnel involved in the operation. Secretary Abalos urged Quiboloy to surrender, he stated "We have a process, we have a justice system we have to follow".

Senator Risa Hontiveros first blamed Quiboloy for his absence in the Senate hearing that worsened the situation. Following Quiboloy's arrest, Hontiveros commended the authorities for their efforts while saying in her statement that Quiboloy "will be held accountable" and that their investigation would continue "to seek an end to the systematic abuse of society's most vulnerable."

The Commission on Human Rights urged both parties to stay calm and follow the judicial process.

The Philippine Council of Evangelical Churches called on Quiboloy and his co-accused to surrender to the police. The group also called on the police to comply to ethical measures in serving the arrest warrants; as well on politicians to act as peacemakers and not turn the operation into an issue for their own political gain.

After the apprehension of Quiboloy, Caritas Philippines president and Kidapawan Bishop Jose Colin Bagaforo issued a statement offering prayers both for the Quiboloy's alleged victims and his followers.

== Senate investigation ==
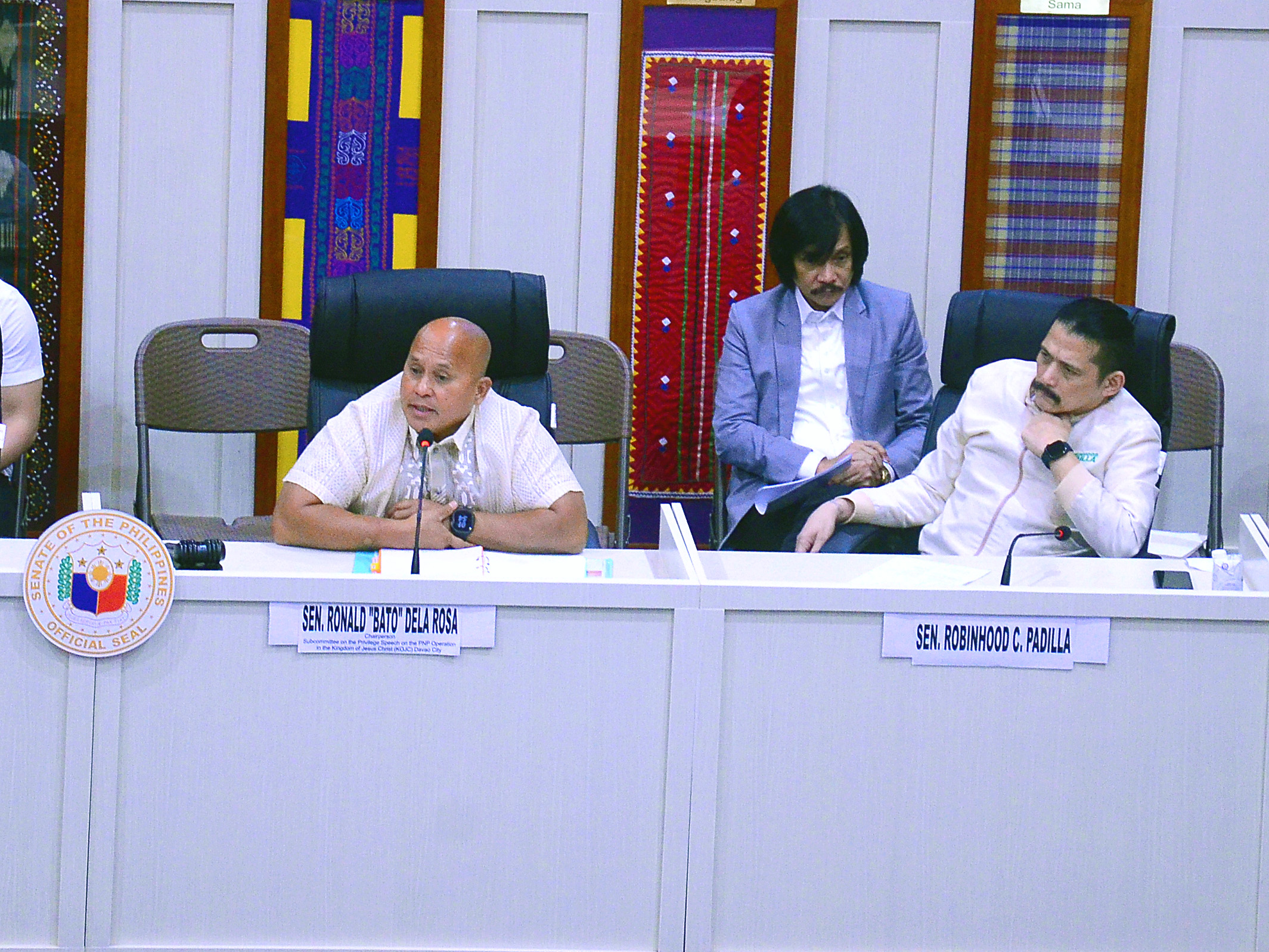
Senators Ronald dela Rosa (left) and Robin Padilla during a public hearing on September 6, 2024, look into alleged abuses committed by the Philippine National Police in its operation against Quiboloy.

The Senate committee on public order and dangerous drugs, chaired by dela Rosa, sought investigation on the police operation, citing reports stating that church members were prevented from entering or leaving the property. In an attempt to resolve the standoff, on the morning of September 6, the Senate joint committee conducted an inspection of the KOJC compound. Dela Rosa, also a member of the committee on justice and human rights, led a group involved in the visit and was also joined by fellow senators Robin Padilla and Bong Go, as well as the city building office. The team observed the cathedral allegedly being used as the police's operations center and that the JMC's basement at that time no longer had police presence.

At the college building's basement, traces of freshly poured cement underneath a pile of lumber on the floor and on the walls were discovered. The police, believing that Quiboloy was still hiding in the area, had been excavating under the basement in the (still unsuccessful) search. They had also conducted the drilling, as seen in a video released earlier by the KOJC. Dela Rosa then ordered the excavation of the newly cemented area and stressed that such action is a "gross mistake" for the police. After the visit and during the Senate hearing, Torre was forced to admit that they dug a hole and that there were engineers, an architect, and even hired civilians dressed in PNP uniforms present. Dela Rosa and the KOJC stated they planned to file cases against the PNP for such actions.

Dela Rosa also noted irregularities in the police operations, particularly how they brought only an arrest warrant and no search warrant. At the public hearing on police operations, held by the Senate at the city council office, Dela Rosa criticized the police's stay in the compound, and a specific instance of the police pepper spraying a church member. City mayor Duterte questioned the integrity and legality of the police operations. Meanwhile, Torre insisted that the police will pursue the search "until [Quiboloy] is found".

== Legal actions ==
In a press conference held by the Department of the Interior and Local Government (DILG) on September 9, Quiboloy and his co-accused were presented to the public, and Abalos revealed that charges had been filed by Rodrigo Duterte and some Quiboloy supporters against him and PNP officials in relation to the search. These include:

- Two counts of malicious mischief under the Revised Penal Code (RPC), filed by Duterte at the Davao City prosecutor's office; respondents include Abalos, PNP chief Police General Rommel Marbil, and Torre In November 2024, Benhur Abalos submitted his counter-affidavit with the Department of Justice denying the allegations.
- Violation of domicile, interruption of religious worship, offending religious feelings, and grave threats, all under the RPC; filed by a group of Quiboloy supporters through Sonia Advincula at the Davao City prosecutor's office.
- Administrative complaints for grave misconduct, grave abuse of authority, and conduct unbecoming of a public officer, against Abalos and the PNP officials; also filed by Advincula.
- A civil case at the Davao RTC Branch 15.

These are separate from the writ of amparo filed by the KOJC before a Davao City court.

On October 17, Torre, this time the newly appointed chief of PNP–CIDG, filed before the DOJ charges of sedition and inciting to sedition against at least twelve individuals, mainly KOJC members, including Torreon and SMNI hosts Jeffrey Celiz and Lorraine Badoy-Partosa. The complaint was also lodged under the Cybercrime Prevention Act which would elevate the punishment a degree higher. Torre said that around 200 cases could be filed against individuals who allegedly concealed the suspects and resisted authorities during the operation, and that they may also face charges such as disobedience to a person in authority, direct assault, slander (all also under the RPC), and obstruction of justice under Presidential Decree 1829.

== Media involvement ==
=== Coverage ===
In one press conference, Torreon defended reporting on the standoff of Sonshine Media Network International (SMNI), KOJC's media outlet, saying that their journalists were caught unprepared and confused by the operation. Several reports from SMNI were refuted by the authorities, including that on the deaths of seven church members in the raid. However, numerous social media footages appeared to prove a claim on the law enforcement using tear gas and pepper spray.

On September 3, the PNP restricted media and KOJC members from accessing the JMC's basement and cathedral in response to Torreon's statements on the alleged digging by the police in the JMC's basement to locate Quiboloy's alleged bunker, and the attempt by Torreon and members of the media to enter the site for an investigation. Likewise, PRO Davao, in a memorandum dated September 2 directing those involved in what was called Oplan 8/24, provided restrictions on taking images or videos and requesting reports from personnel within the compound.

In his privilege speech on September 10, first district city councilor Bonz Andre Militar urged journalists and social media influencers to practice the highest tenets of journalism, noting that media coverage of the police operations left locals "confused, anxious, and […] misinformed" with the spread of false information.

=== Criticisms and harassment on journalists ===
The National Union of Journalists of the Philippines noted reports on harassment on journalists covering the standoff, involving physical attacks on news crews and verbal accusations by the KOJC members, specifically stating they had been called "paid media" and "biased". Particularly, during a rally by the KOJC protesting the police operations, some journalists were prevented from covering the protests. Editha Caduaya, publisher of Davao-based NewsLine, was cited arguing with the protesters: "You were shouting for help from the media. Now that we're here, you're yelling at us! [...] You've been throwing things at us!"

The following day, Torreon apologized for the actions by protesters. However, in separate occasions, Torreon and Eleanor Cardona, a KOJC executive secretary who interrupted another conference, likewise criticized the media outlets.

The NUJP later reminded the groups involved "that media is not the enemy."

== Aftermath ==
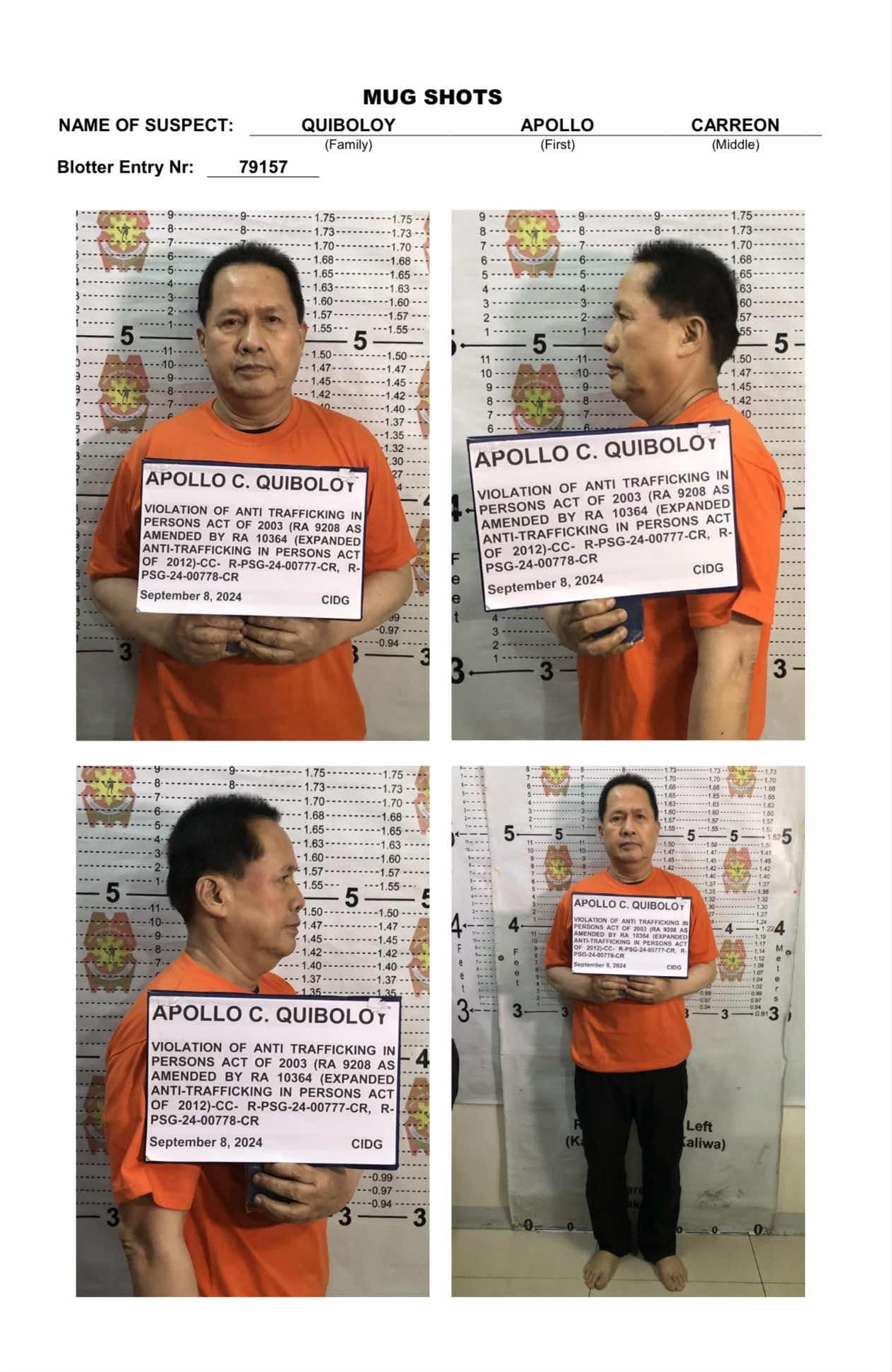
Official mugshot of Quiboloy, released by Interior and Local Government Secretary Benjamin Abalos Jr.

The Quezon City RTC Branch 106 and Pasig RTC Branch 159 separately issued orders on where the five should be detained. The former ordered their transfer, either to the New Quezon City Jail or to the female dormitory of the Quezon City Jail in Camp Karingal. The latter first ordered the PNP "to retain the custody" of the five and later ordered the detention of the co-accused at the Pasig City Jail. The DOJ recommended to keep Quiboloy, who was still under PNP custody.

A day after the arrest, Quiboloy's camp filed a petition for Quiboloy to either be put under house arrest or for his custody be transferred to an AFP detention facility, citing security concerns. The Pasig court later granted the motion of the Department of National Defense to reject the transfer. The lawyers then requested that Quiboloy and Ingrid Canada be transferred to the Veterans Memorial Medical Center in Davao City due to existing health conditions. This was later refuted by the PNP; and the plea was dismissed likewise. The decision has been appealed.

The five pleaded not guilty to charges of qualified human trafficking and sexual abuse.

President Marcos has stated that the Philippines is not yet looking for the extradition of Quiboloy to the United States. The DOJ has stated he would have to face the criminal charges and serve the prison sentence first if convicted. DILG has also raised the possibility of filing charges of obstruction of justice against those who helped Quiboloy in hiding.

The PNP and DILG both said that the (still unidentified) informants will receive a reward amounting a total of ₱14 million.A total of ₱35 million was spent for the whole law enforcement, dubbed as "Operation Plan Teknon Alpha."

The 16-day is currently seen as a potential test case for the provision in the Rules of Court that allow law enforcers to break into buildings or enclosures.

The Pasig Court granted Quiboloy's petition for a medical furlough from November 8–16 at the Philippine Heart Center after suffering chest pain, arrhythmia and atrial fibrillation. The court extended the furlough until November 27 due to dental issues including infected dental implant which affected his jaw.

On January 18, 2025, Quiboloy was hospitalized for pneumonia.

== See also ==
- 2016 Kidapawan protests
- Attempts to arrest Ronald dela Rosa
- Arrest of Rodrigo Duterte
- Waco siege – a 1993 incident in the United States with similarities to the KOJC compound standoff
