= Deformity =

Physical abnormality in a living organism

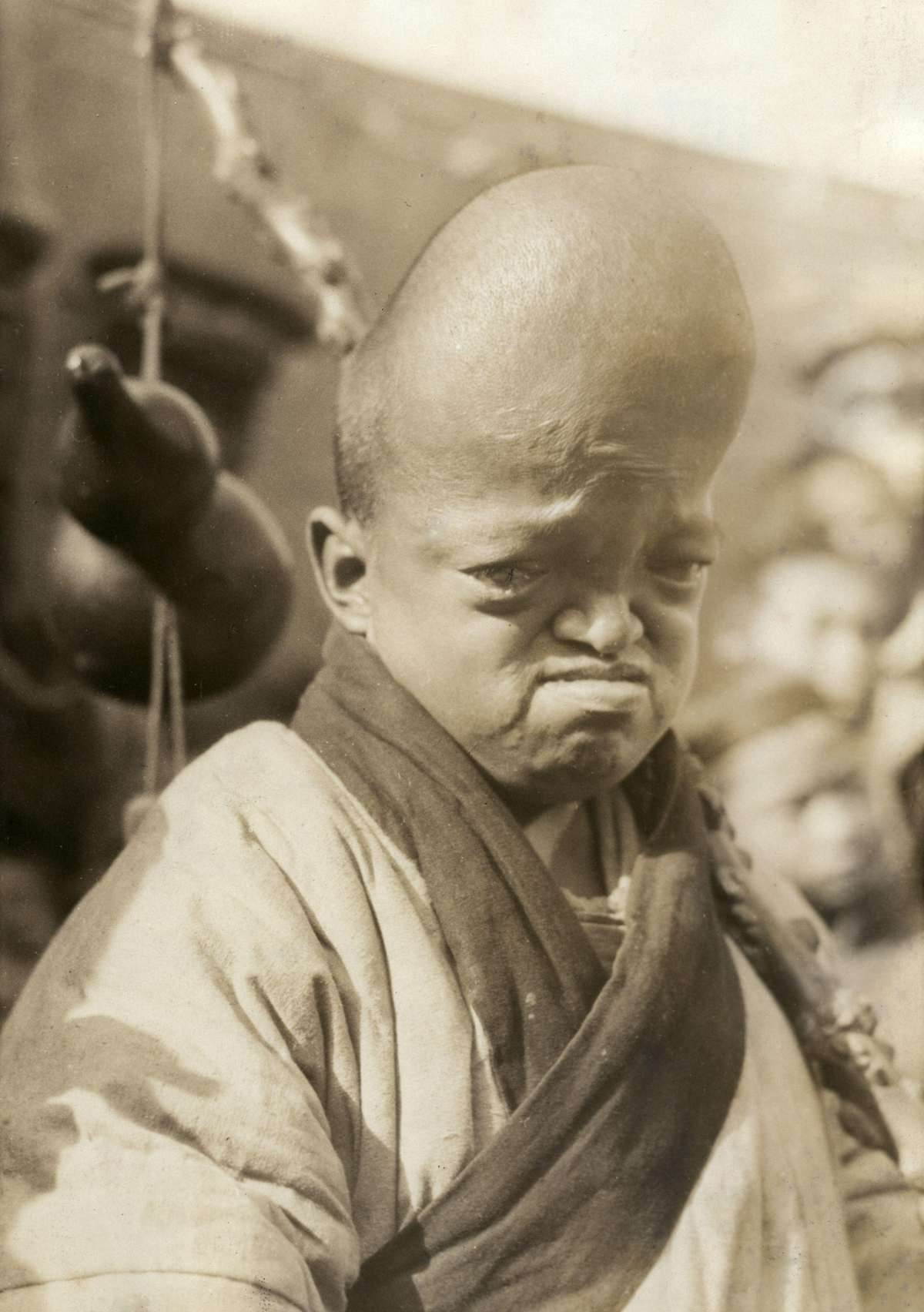
Chinese circus performer with craniosynostosis, 1927

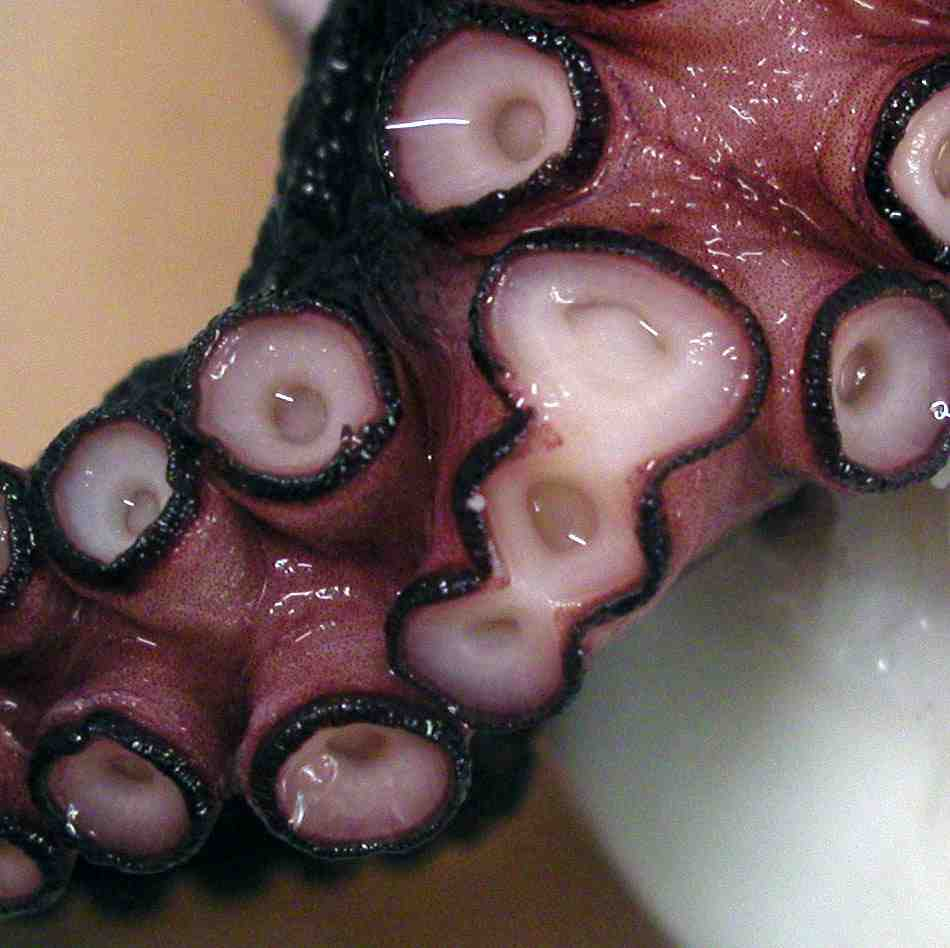
A deformed sucker cluster on an arm of an octopus

A deformity, dysmorphism, or dysmorphic feature is a major abnormality of an organism that makes a part of the body appear or function differently than how it is supposed to.

== Causes ==
Deformity can be caused by a variety of factors:

- Arthritis and other rheumatoid disorders
- Chronic application of external forces, e.g. artificial cranial deformation
- Chronic paresis, paralysis or muscle imbalance, especially in children, e.g. due to poliomyelitis or cerebral palsy
- Complications at birth
- Damage to the fetus or uterus
- Fractured bones left to heal without being properly set (malunion)
- Genetic mutation
- Growth or hormone disorders
- Skin disorders
- Reconstructive surgery following a severe injury, e.g. burn injury
- Mutilation

Deformity can occur in all organisms:

- Frogs can be mutated due to Ribeiroia (Trematoda) infection.
- Plants can undergo irreversible cell deformation
- Insects, such as honeybees, can be affected by deformed wing virus
- Fish can be found with scoliosis due to environmental factors

== Mortality ==
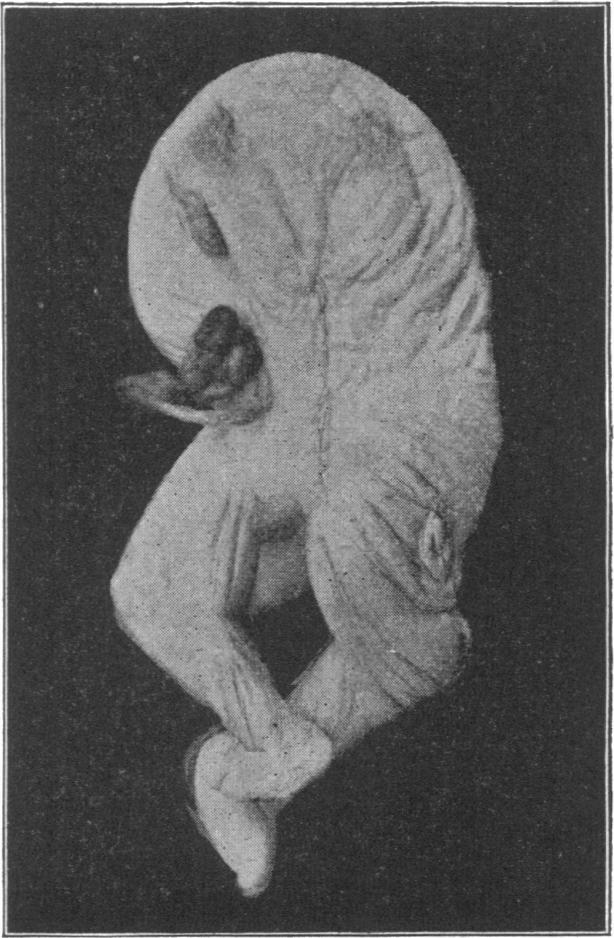
Case of acephalus holoacardiacus – born without a head. Was birthed alongside a healthy twin.

In many cases where a major deformity is present at birth, it is the result of an underlying condition severe enough that the baby does not survive very long. The mortality of severely deformed births may be due to a range of complications including missing or non-functioning vital organs, structural defects that prevent necessary function, high susceptibility to injuries, abnormal facial appearance, or infections that eventually lead to death.

In some cases, such as that of twins, one fetus is brought to term healthy, while the other faces major, even life-threatening defects. An example of this is seen in cattle, referred to as amorphous globosus.

Deformities with mortality (Incompatible with life):

Neural tube defects:

- Anencephaly
- Iniencephaly
- Craniorachischisis

Congenital limb defects:

- Phocomelia (50% chance of death in some infants due to severe Thalidomide exposure)
- Sirenomelia
- Limb body wall complex
- Thanatophoric dysplasia
- Achondrogenesis
- Tetra-amelia syndrome (Genetic form)

Facial deformities:

- Cyclopia
- Otocephaly
- Acrofacial dysostosis, Rodriguez type

Twinning:

- TRAP Sequence (Depending on the size of the acardiac twin is the risk of death of the pump twin)
- Cephalothoracopagus
- Parasitic twin (Parasite)

Genetic disorders:

- Aneuploidies (Trisomy 13, 16, 18, Monosomy 14)
- Triploidy
- Harlequin ichthyosis
- Schinzel-Giedion syndrome
- Raine syndrome
- Pfeiffer syndrome (Type 3 or most frequently, 2)
- Melnick-Needles syndrome in males
- Hydrolethalus syndrome
- Fryns syndrome
- Meckel-Gruber syndrome

== In mythology ==
There are many instances of mythological characters showing signs of a deformity.

- Descriptions of mermaids may be related to the symptoms of sirenomelia.
- The Irish mythology includes the Fomorians, who are almost without exception described as being deformed, possessing only one of what most have two (eyes, arms, legs, etc.) or having larger than normal limbs.
- Hephaestus, of Greek Mythology, was born with a club foot.

== See also ==
- Birth defect
- Body dysmorphic disorder
- Congenital abnormality
- Disfigurement
- Genetic variation
- Malformation
- Monstrous birth
- Phocomelia
- Polymelia
- Teratology
