= KJC King Dome =

Indoor arena in Davao City, Philippines

- Kingdome
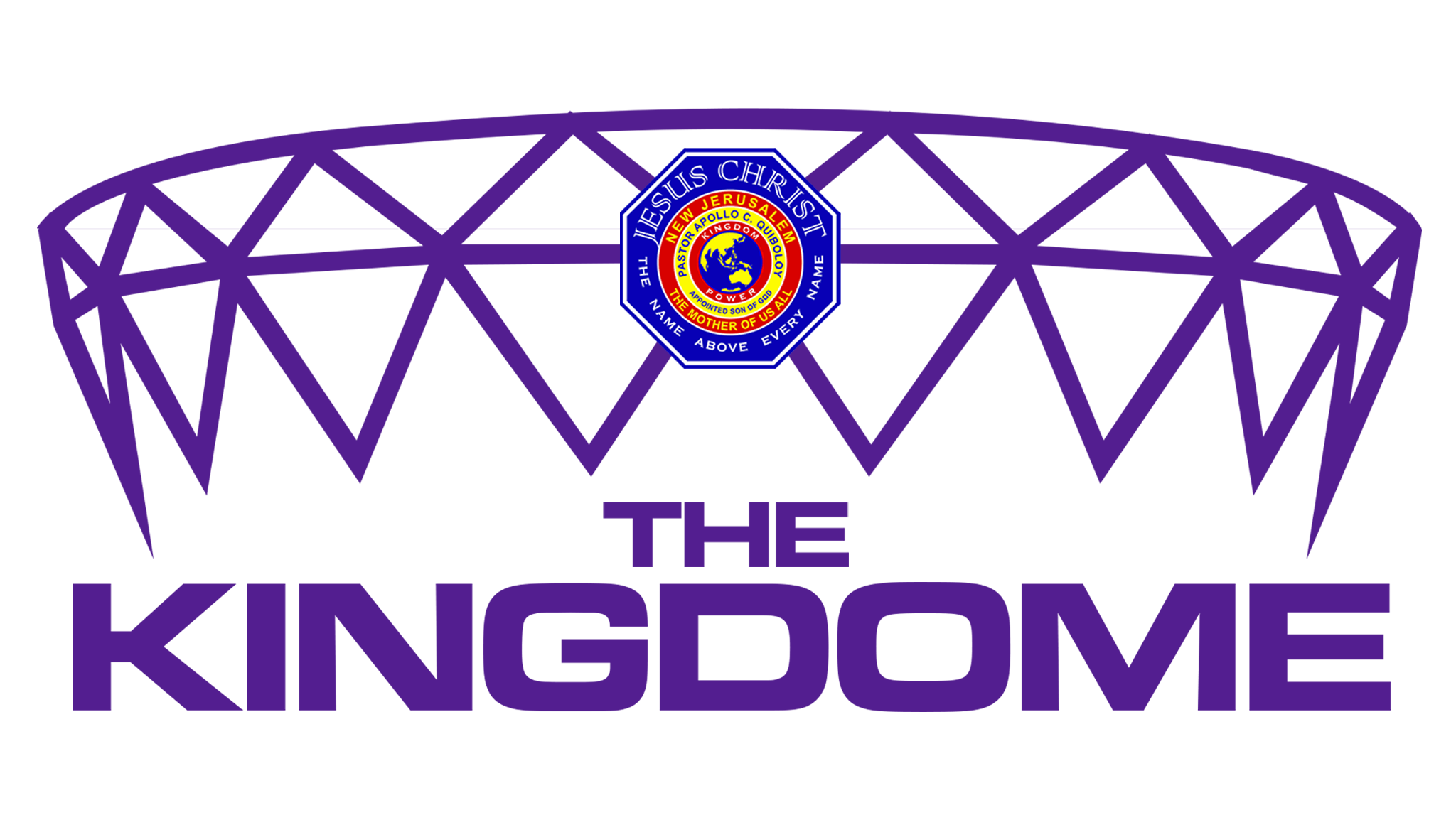

- Facade of the Kingdome
- Interactive map of KJC King Dome
- Full name: Kingdom of Jesus Christ King Dome
- Location: Sasa, Barangay Buhangin, Davao City, Philippines
- Coordinates: 7°8′5″N 125°38′50″E
- Owner: KJC
- Capacity: 75,000
- Scoreboard: Yes

Construction
- Groundbreaking: September 3, 2012; 14 years ago
- Opened: September 1, 2026; 2 months ago
- Cost: ₱13 billion
- Project manager: ACQ Solomonic Builders Development Corporation

The KJC King Dome, also known as KOJC King Dome or simply Kingdome, is a multipurpose indoor arena and cathedral in Davao City, Philippines. With a stadium-like seating capacity of 75,000, it is the largest indoor arena in the world, surpassing the 55,000-capacity Philippine Arena owned by the Iglesia ni Cristo in Bocaue, Bulacan.

The structure is owned by the Kingdom of Jesus Christ and situated beside the Francisco Bangoy International Airport. Construction began in September 2012; and it opened on September 1, 2026 in commemoration of the religious group's 41st founding anniversary. The KJC itself has billed the arena as "the world's largest indoor cathedral".

== History ==
=== Construction ===
The Kingdome under construction in 2022

The construction of the KJC King Dome was managed by the ACQ Solomonic Builders Development Corporation, a subsidiary of the Christian church, Kingdom of Jesus Christ, The Name Above Every Name (or KJC) of Apollo Quiboloy. ACQ Solomonic Builders was headed by president Nelida L. Lizada, who also served as KJC's CEO and Quiboloy's spokesperson. The groundbreaking ceremony of the facility being built beside the Francisco Bangoy International Airport complex commenced on September 3, 2012.

In January 2018, Zhejiang-based Chinese sports firm Dafeng formally entered in a partnership with KJC in a signing ceremony in Hangzhou. The project was included in the Belt and Road Initiative by the Chinese Ministry of Culture.

The construction was delayed due to difficulty in shipping in materials from Vietnam and China but the structure was already 60 to 70 percent complete by November 2019. Initially projected to cost ₱6 billion, the construction cost for the KJC King Dome increased to ₱13 billion due to delays. In November 2023, the indoor arena was reported as almost complete.

=== 2024 arrest of Quiboloy ===
On August 9, 2024, operatives from the Davao Region branch of the National Bureau of Investigation (NBI) entered the KOJC Compound where the Kingdome is located in order to serve the arrest warrant against pastor Quiboloy and four others on charges of child abuse and human trafficking. On August 24, a standoff between the Philippine National Police and KJC members began, which was briefly paused on September 1 to allow the KJC to celebrate its founding anniversary in front of the unfinished arena. By September 8, Quiboloy was arrested by authorities, with his lawyers claiming that he surrendered to the Armed Forces of the Philippines and was not captured by the police force.

=== 2026 inauguration ===
The building was inaugurated on September 1, 2026, coinciding with the KJC's 41st founding anniversary which the organization celebrates as "the Feast of the Passover". AI-generated videos of Quiboloy were shown to attendees during the inauguration ceremony; the actual church leader remains detained at Pasig City Jail facing criminal charges.

More than 80,000 people attended the ceremonies which also include numerous Duterte supporters.

== Use and facilities ==
Inside during the Opening of the Kingdome

Originally planned solely as a cathedral for the Kingdom of Jesus Christ (KJC) of pastor Apollo Quiboloy, the KJC King Dome is also used for other events such as concerts and sports events. The facility hosts a cube scoreboard.

The Kingdome is part of the Kingdom Global City Commercial Complex, a mixed-used development registered as a Tourism Enterprise Zone (TEZ). The complex houses a condominium, a hotel, a museum, a hangar, a water park, a commercial center, and an administration complex.

Bigger than the 55,000-capacity Philippine Arena, the Kingdome itself has a capacity of 75,000, making it the largest indoor arena in the world. Initially, it was planned that the seating capacity of the Kingdome was to be 50,000.

== Architecture and design ==
The Kingdome at night.

An Australian architect firm is reportedly behind the design of the KJC King Dome while Manuel de Luna claims to be the principal architect of the arena. Its exterior is reminiscent of durian; while the golden canopies are inspired by the Philippine eagle. Its interiors combine "American, European, Oriental and modern design elements". The building has a floor area of 58,400 square meters (629,000 sq ft); with its roofing covering 25,000 m^{2} (270,000 sq ft) and its center arena occupying a space of 6,616 m^{2} (71,210 sq ft).

The design has been compared to the Crypto.com Arena by KJC leader Apollo Quiboloy, with one level of the Kingdome excavated down 9 meters (30 ft) below due to its proximity to Davao City's international airport in compliance to Civil Aviation Authority of the Philippines regulations. Its foundation is supported by 140 bored piles and 32 footings, being designed to withstand an Intensity IX earthquake. It has 24 "self-starting" escalators and 8 elevators.

Dafeng, a firm involved in the project will provide the lighting, seating, curtain wall, and stage machinery of the indoor arena. The KJC Kingdome will have a double-curved glass curtain wall, a cellular aluminum panel system, and flood lighting. Its facade will look like a crown. The structure has six layers of insulation and waterproofing.

KJC claims that the building has the country's largest air-conditioning load with its cooling system having a capacity of 10,800 tons of refrigeration. The facility uses 272-km main feeder cables and nearly 12-km chilled-water and condenser pipes. Meanwhile, its electricity supply is said larger than the demand of the nearby city of Samal, Davao del Norte.

The property has a separate 7,000-sqm mechanical and electrical building housing eight cooling towers, 24 water pumps and eight chillers. It also has two main transformers connected from Davao Light; and eight standby generators.
