= Jose Maria College =

Private college in Davao City, Philippines

- Other names: Jose Maria College Foundation, Inc. (full legal name)
- Former name: Jose Maria Academy (2002–03)
- Motto: Assured, Consistent, and Quality Education (ACQ)
- Type: Non-profit, private, higher education institution
- Established: 2002
- Founder: Apollo Quiboloy
- Religious affiliation: Kingdom of Jesus Christ, Non-sectarian in administration
- President: Jose Ma. S.E Gonzales
- Location: Davao City, Philippines; 7°08′00″N 125°38′42″E
- Nickname: Kings
- Website: jmc.edu.ph
- Location in Mindanao Location in the Philippines

Jose Maria College Foundation, Inc. (JMCFI), or simply Jose Maria College (JMC), is a tertiary educational institution in Davao City, Philippines.

== Background ==
Campus building

Jose Maria College was founded by pastor Apollo Quiboloy of the Kingdom of Jesus Christ church, naming the institution after his parents, José Quiboloy and María Carreon. The campus which broke ground in 2000 and opened two years later as the "Jose Maria Academy" is situated near Francisco Bangoy International Airport. It adopted its current name in 2003.

== Administration and admission ==
While its founder is affiliated with the Kingdom of Jesus Christ (KOJC), JMC is non-sectarian in administration and is open to admission to any students regardless of religious background. It offers both basic (kindergarten to senior high school) to tertiary education.

At the 2024 Senate hearings which tackled the alleged abuses of the KOJC and Quiboloy, the JMC were alleged to be promising KJC members scholarship in exchange for being full-time workers for KJC. The administration was also accused of withholding transcript of records from its ex-KJC students who left church.

== Sports ==
The Jose Maria College's varsity team are known as the JMC Kings. The JMC maintains a men's basketball team. They also have a women's volleyball team named the Lady Royals which has played in the 2023 National Invitationals of the Shakey's Super League.

== Presidents ==
- Apollo Quiboloy (2002–2021)
- Felix Chavez, Jr. (2021–2024)
- Jose Ma. S.E. Gonzales (2024-present)
