= Omar Baliw =

Filipino rapper

- Born: Omar Harry Balmes Manzano
- Origin: Makati
- Genres: Hip-hop
- Instrument: Vocals
- Years active: 2011–present

Omar Harry Balmes Manzano, professionally known as Omar Baliw, is a Filipino rapper.

== Career ==
Omar Harry Manzano is a native of Naga, Camarines Sur but is a resident of Pembo, Makati (now Taguig). He started making music while he was still a teenager and worked odd-jobs during college such as being a gasoline station attendant and a restroom cleaner.

He started being active in the hip-hop scene in 2008 and later released his debut album "High Minds Music" in 2011. His parents were skeptical of him pursuing a career in the genre but a microphone he was gifted by his then-girlfriend now wife encouraged him. His stage name Omar Baliw (baliw being Filipino for "crazy") is a reference to his performing style which is characterized by tendency to jump and perform somersaults. He has named Gloc-9 as an inspiration for his works.

His big break came when he released "K&B" in 2019 which was performed with fellow artist CLR.

Omar Baliw established presence in Spotify and set up a YouTube channel to exhibit his works. He is also present in Facebook and TikTok. He has also collaborated with other artists including Gloc-9.

In June 2022, Believe Artist Services signed Omar to a management contract In June 2023, he became part of the Asintada Management and Production Inc. talent agency ran by Gloc-9's wife.

In September 2023, he announced intention to retire in five years time before he turns 40 years old to focus on his family.

Baliw sued senatorial candidate and Kingdom of Jesus Christ founder Apollo Quiboloy for using a remix of his song "K&B" for the pastor's campaign jingle in March 2025.

== Personal life ==
He is married to Dana, whom he first dated during his college years. He has two children. He also runs the High Minds Clothing line.
