= Apollo Quiboloy =

Filipino religious leader (born 1950)

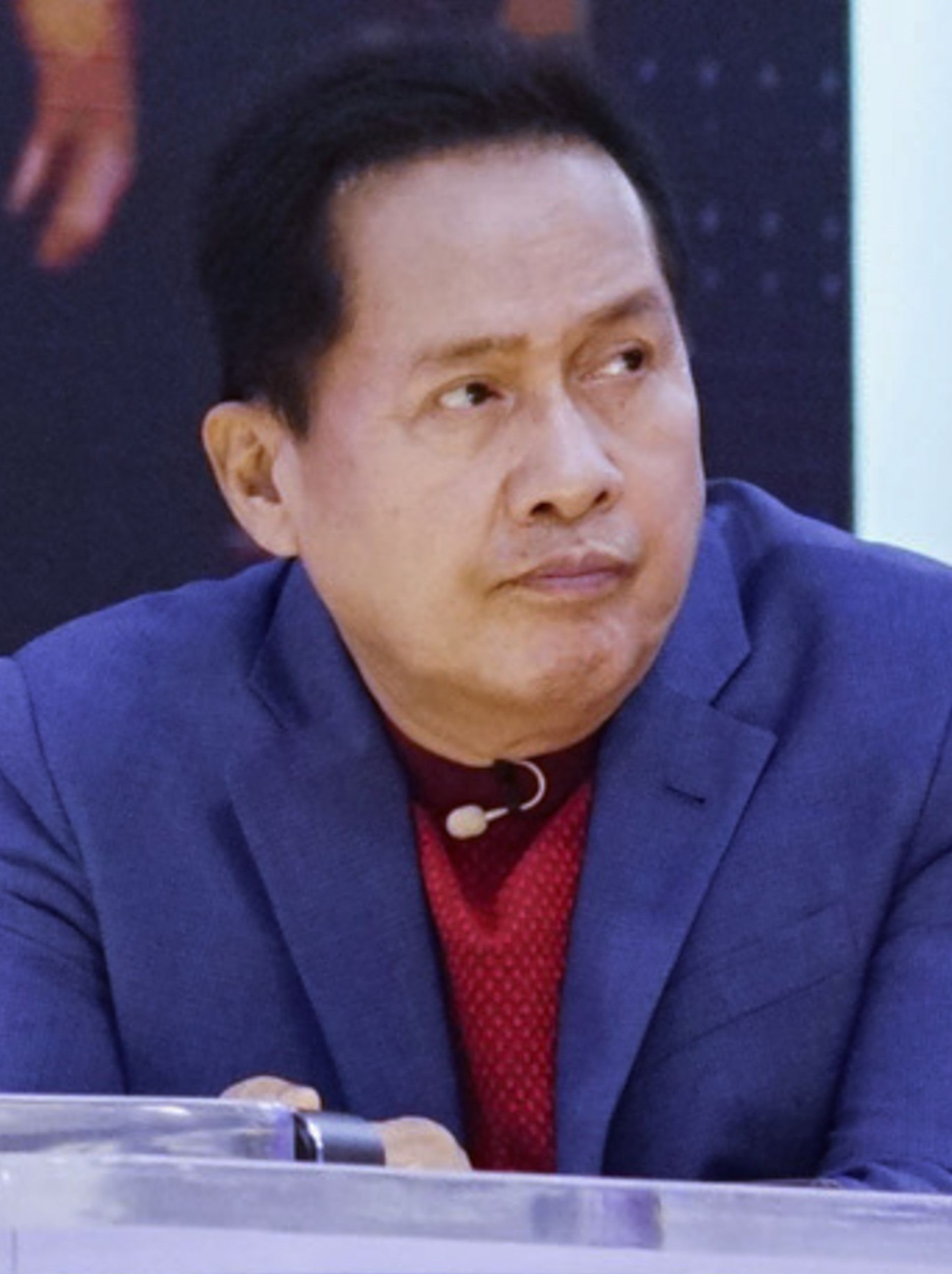
- Quiboloy in 2022
- Born: Apollo Carreon Quiboloy; April 25, 1950 (age 76); Dumanlas, Buhangin, Davao City, Philippines
- Other names: PACQ, ACQ
- Occupation: Pastor
- Political party: Independent (since 2024)
- Criminal status: Incarcerated at Pasig City Jail
- Title: Appointed Son of God; Owner of the Universe

Personal life
- Website: www.apolloquiboloy.com (archived)

Religious life
- Religion: Christianity
- Denomination: Restorationist
- Church: United Pentecostal Church of the Philippines (former); Kingdom of Jesus Christ
- Founder of: Kingdom of Jesus Christ

Senior posting
- Post: Executive Pastor of the Kingdom of Jesus Christ
- Period in office: 1985–2022
- Predecessor: Position established
- Successor: Marlon Acobo

Apollo Carreon Quiboloy (locally [kɪboˈlɔɪ]; born April 25, 1950) (Note: The Federal Bureau of Investigation listed 1947 or 1950 as his birth year. A post on the SMNI News Channel Facebook page lists Quiboloy's 71st birthday as April 27, 2021, thus Quiboloy was born in 1950.) is a Filipino pastor and the leader of the Kingdom of Jesus Christ (KOJC or KJC), a Restorationist church based in the Philippines. He founded the KOJC in 1985, proclaiming himself the "Appointed Son of God" and the "Owner of the Universe".

Quiboloy is notable for founding the broadcasting network Sonshine Media Network International (SMNI) and gained further recognition for his close ties with the 16th Philippine president, Rodrigo Duterte.

Quiboloy is currently on the Federal Bureau of Investigation's wanted list after the Central District of California indicted him and his accomplices for various crimes, including sex and human trafficking, marriage fraud, coercion, money laundering, cash smuggling, and other charges. After refusing to cooperate with Philippine government inquiries into the alleged human rights violations, the Senate of the Philippines issued an arrest warrant on March 19, 2024, and the Department of the Interior and Local Government offered a ₱10,000,000 (US$170,770) bounty for information leading to Quiboloy's arrest on July 8, 2024. Quiboloy was arrested on September 8, 2024.

== Early life ==
Apollo Carreon Quiboloy was born on April 25, 1950. The youngest out of nine children, his parents were natives from Lubao, before migrating after the Second World War to seek better work opportunities.

== Early religious involvement ==
=== Oneness Pentecostal and the UPCP ===
Quiboloy's father, José, was originally a Protestant and member of the Christian and Missionary Alliance, before moving to Oneness Pentecostal with his four sons. His family were locally known as pastor-leaders during the early years of the United Pentecostal Church of the Philippines (UPCP) in Davao.

Apollo's sibling, Jose, later became the Assistant General Superintendent of the UPCP before moving for independent work at the Greater Manila area. Apollo claims to have started experiencing spiritual visions at the age of 14, during a visit to Malungon, South Cotabato (now Sarangani). According to his website, he envisioned encounters with the Lord and the earth being burnt in a bowl of fire.

These visions also include captions such as "...the sun shall be turned into darkness, and the moon into blood before that great and notable day of the Lord come" and "If ye shall seek me ye shall find me in my way". Quiboloy would recall these visions as the Second Coming of Jesus.

==== Career with UPCP as the "Preaching Machine" ====
Quiboloy never saw preaching as his future career, originally expressing desires to become a nautical engineer and pilot. However, because of the benefits that came with Bible college including free board and meals, fully paid tuition fees and a free boat ride to Manila, he continued to study theology at the United Pentecostal Bible Institute (later the Apostolic Center for Theological Studies), graduating in 1972.

He continued to preach for the UPCP after completing college and gained moniker as a "Preaching Machine". On 1973, the UPCP nominated Quiboloy to represent them at the International Youth Corps World Conference held at Seoul, South Korea. The denomination would also elect Quiboloy as UPCP's national youth president in 1974.

==== Conflict with UPCP and founding of KOJC ====
After involving himself with another preacher named "Major Sanchez", Apollo was disfellowshipped by the UPCP in 1979. According to church documents, Sanchez was recently placed out-of-bounds by other pastors in Davao. Quiboloy later re-applied and expressed sorrow. He was accepted back in 1980.

Upon returning in 1980, Quiboloy was reassigned to preach at the Agdao church to slowly regain reputation to his church. However, he was investigated by the UPCP board again in 1985 after he introduced unorthodox ideals and inducing hate to neighboring pastors. According to documentation, Quiboloy told his followers on one occasion that other UPCP pastors are 'unqualified' and 'ignorant'. On September 1, 1985—before a scheduled meeting with UPCP's district board—Quiboloy would vacate the Agdao church with several followers to assemble his new denomination, the Kingdom of Jesus Christ, The Name Above Every Name.

== Kingdom of Jesus Christ ==
Quiboloy founded the Kingdom of Jesus Christ, The Name Above Every Name (also known as KOJC or KJC) on September 1, 1985 and appointed himself as leader and Executive Pastor. He started preaching at the slums of Villamor, Agdao with 15 members and received critical comments due to his claims on being the "Appointed Son of God". Their main cathedral is beside Francisco Bangoy International Airport just along the Carlos P. Garcia National Highway in Buhangin, Davao City.

Their church followers would refer to themselves as the "Kingdom Nation". The church claims to have around 4 million followers within the Philippines and over 2 million in other territories. Their schedule on weekdays involves members hosting Bible sessions and prayer services. Another event, titled Sounds of Worship is held every Sunday online and at their main cathedral in Buhangin, Davao City.

=== Divinity claims ===
Quiboloy is known for claiming possession of divinity such as 'stopping' the 2019 Cotabato earthquakes on his command. He would later tell that the public should thank him for the act. He has publicly said that he did not do the same to stop the onslaught of Typhoon Kammuri (Tisoy) in response to those critical of his earlier claim in stopping the Cotabato earthquakes.

During the COVID-19 pandemic, Quiboloy claimed on his YouTube channel that the emergence of the Omicron variant is caused by his prosecution from the US and the negative criticism from the public. He claimed that the virus will stop if freed from his active charges.

=== Involvement with other related organizations ===
==== Jose Maria College ====
Quiboloy later founded the Jose Maria College in 2000 naming the institution after his parents. They are currently offering more than 30 programmes from basic, grade-school education, specialised Medicine and Law programmes, to TESDA-accredited vocational courses.

==== Swara Sug Network Corporation ====
Under Quiboloy's leadership, the church founded the Swara Sug Network Corporation (SSMC), famously known as the Sonshine Media Network International (SMNI). The network served as the KOJC's official media platform. Before establishing the SSMC, they would utilise agreements with local radio stations in Davao (DXDC and DXUM) to host their local programmes such as Pagsusi sa Kamatuoran ("Searching for Truth" or "Paghahanap ng Katotohanan") among others.

In 1991, they launched their first television program titled The Hour of Truth by utilising blocktime agreements with IBC and ABS-CBN stations throughout cities in Visayas and Mindanao.

== Political involvement ==
=== Endorsements and affiliations ===
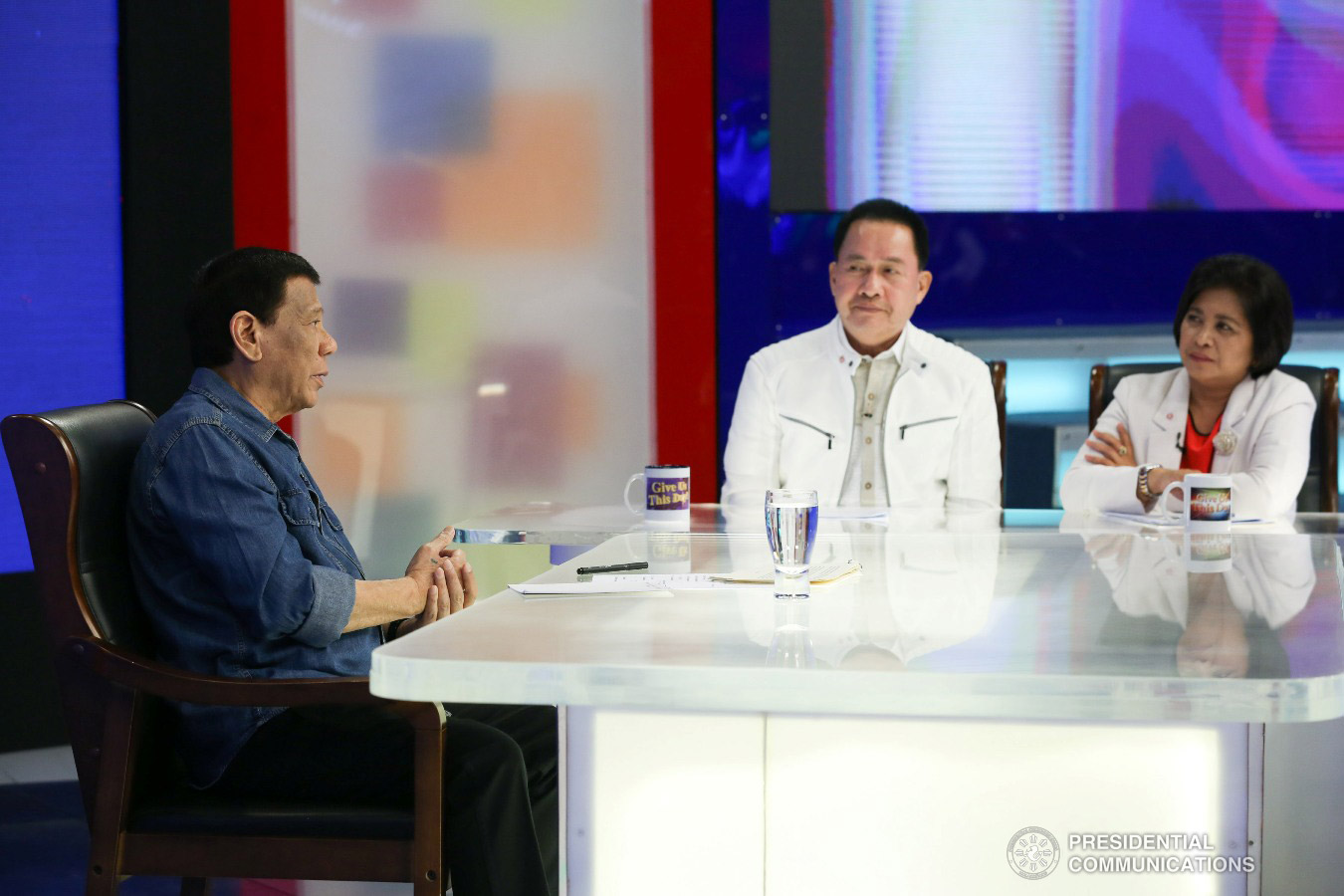
Quiboloy (center) talks to guest and President of the Philippines Rodrigo Duterte in Give Us This Day of SMNI in 2019.

Quiboloy supported Gloria Macapagal Arroyo's presidential campaign to earn a regular term in the 2004 election. Arroyo became president in 2001 after Joseph Estrada was deposed in the Second EDSA Revolution.

Quiboloy endorsed the candidacy of Gilbert Teodoro for the 2010 Philippine presidential election. Teodoro was the preferred candidate of the then-incumbent Arroyo administration. However Quiboloy would endorse Mar Roxas for the vice presidency and not Teodoro's running mate Edu Manzano. Teodoro finished fourth in the election with 4,095,839 votes (or 11.33%). He remarked that he was disturbed by reports of fraud and cheating and wondered to whom did votes from his church go.

Quiboloy is a close associate of Rodrigo Duterte. In the 2016 elections, Quiboloy and the members of the Kingdom of Jesus Christ endorsed the presidential candidacy of Davao City mayor Duterte and his running mate Senator Alan Peter Cayetano. Quiboloy also lent his private jet and helicopter to be used in Duterte's presidential campaign. Quiboloy also served as Duterte's spiritual adviser during his presidency. Post-presidency, Duterte would serve as the administrator of the assets of the pastor's church amidst Quiboloy facing scrutiny from the Philippine government.

In the 2022 elections, Quiboloy endorsed the candidacy of Bongbong Marcos who was running for president. He supported his vice presidential candidate, Sara Duterte as well. Quiboloy's parents' loyal support for former president Ferdinand Marcos was a factor for the endorsement. Quiboloy at the time have been reportedly good friends with the Marcos family in general. However, following inquiries made by both houses of the Congress against him and SMNI, relations have deteriorated. In February 2024, Quiboloy alleged that President Marcos and First Lady Liza Marcos are conspiring with the United States to assassinate him. However he has remained cordial with Senator Imee Marcos who insists the pastor has been kind to many people.

=== 2025 Senate electoral bid ===
In October 2024, Quiboloy filed his certificate of candidacy for the 2025 Philippine Senate election through his lawyer, Mark Tolentino. He initially ran under the Workers' and Peasants' Party (WPP). However, the WPP's Sonny Matula denied signing Quiboloy's candidacy form. On October 17, Matula filed a petition to disqualify Quiboloy's candidacy at the Commission on Elections on grounds of "material representation". In response, Quiboloy also filed a petition to have Matula and his entire senatorial slate disqualified on the same grounds. On October 21, Quiboloy withdrew his representation of the WPP and formally ran as an independent candidate. On December 18, COMELEC dismissed the disqualification case against Quiboloy, citing insufficient and incorrect evidence.

Quiboloy officially launched his campaign on February 11, 2025. His platform is focused on dealing with corruption and national security. He proposed the imposition of death penalty for politicians convicted of corruption offenses. In March 2025, Quiboloy was sued by hip-hop artist Omar Baliw for copyright infringement after one of his songs was used as an electoral jingle by Quiboloy's campaign.

Quiboloy was defeated in the Senate election, finishing in 31st place. In response to the result, he called for a manual recount of the votes, citing "numerous reports of overvoting anomalies, inconsistencies in ballot readings, and other electoral irregularities."

=== Communist rebellion ===
Quiboloy has criticised the Communist Party of the Philippines, New People's Army, and the National Democratic Front (CPP–NPA–NDF) which forms a triumvirate waging a communist rebellion against the Philippine government. Likewise, he has accused several political figures of being associated with or sympathizers of the CPP–NPA–NDF. He also considered running for the 2022 presidential election, under an anti-communist platform which targeted rebels and alleged sympathizers.

== Controversies ==
=== Allegations of brainwashing by a former church member ===
Quiboloy and the Kingdom of Jesus Christ have been sued by a woman for allegedly brainwashing and holding her 19-year-old daughter, who joined the church in 2004, against her will.

=== Dispute with the New People's Army ===
The New People's Army (NPA), the armed wing of the Communist Party of the Philippines, has accused Quiboloy of being behind the massacre of K'lata-Bagobo leader Datu Domingo Diarog and his family on April 29, 2008, for allegedly refusing to sell 2 hectares (20,000 m^{2}) of their property for ₱50,000 to Quiboloy and his sect.

The property is within the 700 hectares (7.0 km^{2}) ancestral domain claimed by the Bagobo people in Tugbok and is adjacent to Quiboloy's walled "prayer mountain" in Tamayong.

Diarog's widow said followers of Quiboloy had threatened to evict them from the land and her relatives were even offered a ₱20,000 bounty for Diarog's head.

Quiboloy, however, said the charges were "totally false and baseless, if not ridiculous."

While Quiboloy has branded the rebels "mga anak ni Satanas" ("Satan's children"), the NPA has declared him a "warlord in the service of the Arroyo administration's policies against the peasants and indigenous peoples."

Police investigator Ireneo Dalogdog, head of the Tugbok police office, said he had been receiving reports that Diarog was being harassed by armed men associated with Quiboloy, and that Diarog's farmhouse had earlier been razed three times.

=== ABS-CBN shutdown ===
In November 2019, comedian Vice Ganda satirized Quiboloy's claims of stopping the series of earthquakes in Mindanao by exclaiming "Stop!" during an impromptu sketch in It's Showtime!. Vice sardonically challenged Quiboloy to also stop the country's longest running television series Ang Probinsyano, which had been aired on ABS-CBN for at least five years at that point. Quiboloy accepted the challenge and declared that in four months, the whole network's operations would shut down as well. On May 5, 2020, the National Telecommunications Commission ordered ABS-CBN to cease its television and radio broadcasting operations after their 25-year broadcast franchise expired the previous day, and officially signed off at 7:52 p.m (local time) the same day. More than two months later, on July 10, 2020, the House of Representatives of the Philippines rejected the new ABS-CBN franchise bid after a 70–11 vote against it. Following this, ABS-CBN shifted its news, radio, and entertainment operations into online platforms and other television networks. Ang Probinsyano released its series finale on August 12, 2022.

=== Ongoing accusations, indictments, and sanctions ===
Quiboloy's FBI wanted notice

The prosecutors for the Central District of California indicted Quiboloy and top church administrators for conspiracy to conduct human and sex trafficking, money laundering, immigration fraud and other charges on November 11, 2021. The prosecutors also alleges that followers were coerced by Apollo and administrators into soliciting funds at long hours with little to no pay. Some followers were sexually and physically abused by Quiboloy and other church administrators, under the guise of avoiding 'eternal damnation'.

==== Full-time workers ====
Some of KOJC's followers were assigned as 'full time workers' (FTW's) to help with fundraising activities nationwide and internationally. Some of these workers were coerced, forced, and physically abused by Quiboloy as well as the church administrators to strictly follow church rules and meet fundraising quotas.

==== Full-time workers in North America ====
The highest-achieving full-time workers (workers that raised most funds in the Philippines) were nominated by church personnel to fundraise in North America. Apollo's administrators would falsify their visa applications, claiming that they're only travelling for church-related performances. The administrators would also arrange sham marriages with other church followers in the US in order for the FTW's to continue soliciting funds in the United States.

Upon arriving in the United States, church administrators would confiscate the workers' passports and coerce them into soliciting and fundraising. Lead administrators created non-profit entities such as the "Children's Joy Foundation USA" as their platform to fundraise. Full-time workers would claim that any funds raised are for helping impoverished children in the Philippines but prosecutors allege that in reality, most or all of the raised money were used to fund Quiboloy and their administrator's lavish lifestyle.

==== 'Night duty' and pastorals ====
According to the indictment, some ladies were forced to "night duties", in which they were sexually abused by Quiboloy. Prosecutors stated that they will also retrieve Quiboloy's US assets originating from ill-gotten wealth, alleging that he used church donations to pay for his lifestyle.

On February 5, 2022, the Federal Bureau of Investigation released a wanted poster for Quiboloy.

As of August 2022, the Philippine Department of Foreign Affairs is still yet to receive an extradition request from the US Department of Justice. Once found to be sufficient, the request can then be endorsed to the Philippine Department of Justice.

On December 10, 2022, the US Department of Treasury and Department of State imposed sanctions on Quiboloy for gross human rights abuses and corruption. These sanctions come on the occasion of International Anti-Corruption Day and on the eve of International Human Rights Day, wherein the United States sanctioned up to 40 individuals and entities from nine different countries for corruption and human rights violations. The sanctions were imposed based by Executive Order 13818 pursuant to the US Global Magnitsky Act. Quiboloy is accused of being involved in the sexual abuse and human trafficking of young girls within his religious group.

The US imposed the following sanctions on Quiboloy.

- All properties and interests that are in the US or in possession of US persons are blocked and must be referred to the US’ treasury department.
- Any entities directly or indirectly owned, 50% or more are blocked.
- All transactions of US persons or within/transiting in the US that involve any of Quiboloy's property or interests in property are prohibited, unless authorized.
- Making or receipt of any contribution or provision of funds, goods, or services by, to, or for Quiboloy's benefit are also prohibited.

On March 1, 2024, Terry J. Hatter Jr. ordered the unsealing of the arrest warrants requested by the United States Department of Justice Criminal Division against Quiboloy as first step in the extradition process initiation.

Quiboloy's assets in the United States are sanctioned by the US Department of Treasury Office of Foreign Assets Control (OFAC) on December 10, 2022 after the OFAC imposed more than 40 individuals and entities for corruption and human rights abuses.

==== Philippine Senate inquiry contempt order ====
On February 21, 2024, Quiboloy, in an almost 40-minute audio recording, claimed that the US, President Bongbong Marcos, and First Lady Liza Araneta-Marcos conspired in a plot to assassinate him, prompting him to go into hiding for his safety. Quiboloy said the FBI had placed a $2 million bounty on him, that his reputation was being maliciously tarnished, and that he was being persecuted because of his relationship with the Duterte family. Senator Risa Hontiveros responded by saying Quiboloy should "stop playing a victim" and "simply to face the allegations in the legal process" or face arrest; meanwhile, the US Embassy in the Philippines said it was confident Quiboloy will "face justice for his heinous crimes". Supporters of Quiboloy held a protest at Liwasang Bonifacio on March 4, holding placards bearing the messages "Justice for Pastor Apollo", "Resign Risa Hontiveros", "Restore Freedom of Expression", and "Stop Human Rights Abuses". On March 5, Senator Risa Hontiveros, chair of the Senate Committee on Women, Children, Family Relations and Gender Equality, cited Quiboloy in contempt "for his refusal to be sworn or to testify" before an ongoing Senate investigation of alleged crimes within Quiboloy's organization; Hontiveros further requested the Senate President to order his arrest so that Quiboloy "may be brought to testify". Senator Robin Padilla moved to block the arrest order, describing Quiboloy "as a hero and a victim" for fighting the New Peoples Army; Padilla initiated a letter of objection to Quiboloy's arrest signed by him and three other Senators—Imee Marcos, Cynthia Villar, and Bong Go.

In early July 2024, a ₱10 million bounty was offered by the Department of Interior and Local Government (DILG) for information that would lead to Quiboloy's arrest. Quiboloy's lawyer, Ferdinand Topacio, questioned the bounty as it came from anonymous private persons, whose identities the DILG refused to disclosed.

==== Philippine justice department case ====
On March 19, 2024, the DOJ filed child abuse and human trafficking charges against Quiboloy and co-accused Jackielyn W. Roy, Cresente Canada, Paulene Canada, Ingrid C. Canada, and Sylvia Cemane. The Information charged Quiboloy of Qualified Human Trafficking charges under Section 4 (a) of Republic Act No. 9208, the Anti-Trafficking in Persons Act of 2003 as amended, before a Pasig court. The charges under Section 5(b) and Section 10(a) of Republic Act 7610, the "Special Protection of Children Against Abuse, Exploitation, and Discrimination Act" were also filed against Quiboloy before a Davao court. No bail was recommended for the charges.

The Davao Regional Trial Court Branch 12-Family Court, in an Order dated April 1, 2024 of Judge Dante Baguio, declined to defer the immediate implementation of an arrest warrant against Apollo Quiboloy and five others for child abuse and sexual abuse. On April 3, the NBI placed under its custody the 3 accused after having arrested Barangay Tamayong, District Calinan Chairman, Cresente Canada, while KOJC church associates Paulene Canada and Sylvia Cemañes voluntarily surrendered. The 3 were all freed after having posted P80,000 bail each. Accordingly, the Davao City Police forthwith served the arrest warrants against Quiboloy and his co-accused. "The Officers went to the KOJC headquarters to serve the warrant," Davao Region Police Director PBGen. Alden B. Delvo, PRO 11 said. The NBI would consider Quiboloy as a fugitive. On April 4, Jackielyn Roy and Ingrid Canada, the personal assistants of Quiboloy surrendered to the NBI and were freed after having posted P80,000 bail each. The Supreme Court of the Philippines' Second Division granted DOJ's April 4 petition for change of venue to avoid miscarriage of justice. It ordered Davao City RTC Branch 12 Clerk of Court to deliver court case records to the Office of the Executive Judge of the RTC, QC RTC for raffle.

On April 11, Pasig Regional Trial Court, Branch 159 Acting Presiding Judge Rainelda Estacio-Montesa issued a warrant of arrest against Quiboloy, Jackielyn Roy, Sylvia Cemañes, Cresente, Paulene, and Ingrid Canada for violations of Section 4 (a) of Anti-Trafficking in Persons Act of 2003. Lawyer Israelito Torreon said “he still in the Philippine territory and they would file the motion to quash” forthwith. Marcos Jr. said that "Quiboloy’s surrender conditions were a tail-wagging-the-dog situation, but also assured Quiboloy that the government would “exercise all the compassion” to him.

==== Arrest ====
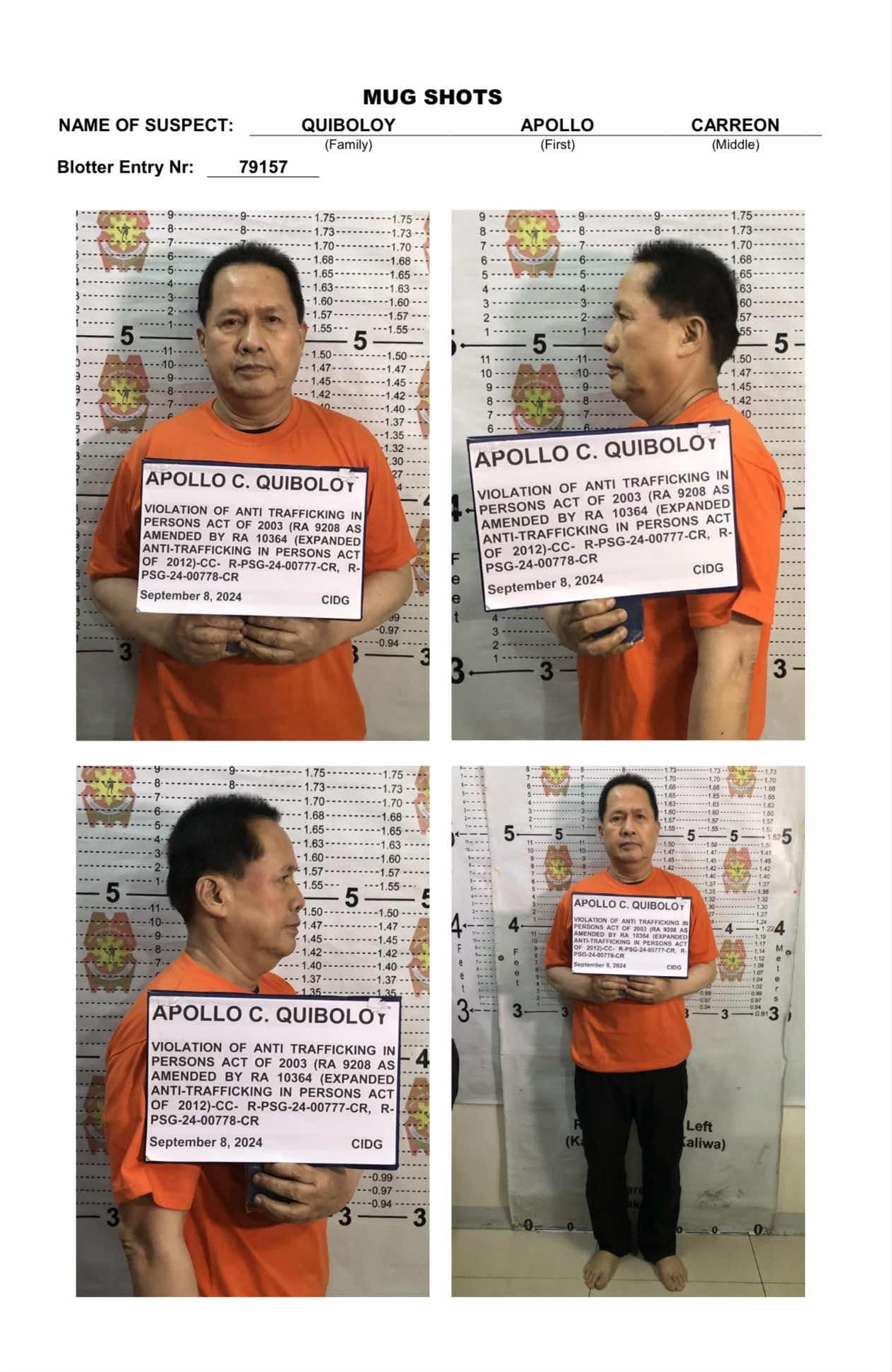
Official mugshot of Quiboloy, released by Interior and Local Government Secretary Benjamin Abalos Jr.

On June 10, 2024, the Criminal Investigation and Detection Group and about 100 police officers of the Philippine National Police-Special Action Force raided Quiboloy's properties to serve him an arrest warrant. The raided properties were the KOJC Dome at Buhangin District at 4 a.m., including Quiboloy's Glory Mountain and Prayer Mountain in Barabgat Tamayong and KJC compound in Lanang at 8 a.m. Quiboloy's counsel agreed to the third and latest service of three arrest warrants upon him and five accused. KJC members protested at the raid and expressed shock at the presence of "the police and military in full battle gear". However, Davao PR 11–PIO chief Major Catherine Dela Rey, in an autopatch explained that "Quiboloy and the other subjects were not found." The raiding forces destroyed the KOJC compound main gate, while two KOJC members were injured and five people carrying bolos were arrested. The raids were condemned by former President Duterte, who described the implementation of the arrest warrants as "excessive and unnecessary force" and "overkill". A resolution was later filed by Senator Robin Padilla asking the Senate to probe the police's alleged use of "unnecessary and excessive force" during the raids.

Police operations in the compound continued until September 8, 2024, when Quiboloy was apprehended in Davao City. The Philippine National Police later said that Quiboloy surrendered to the Intelligence Service of the Armed Forces of the Philippines following a 24-hour ultimatum issued by the PNP. Quiboloy was taken to Metro Manila and detained at PNP headquarters in Camp Crame, Quezon City. On September 9, Quezon City Regional Trial Court (RTC) Branch 106 ordered the transfer of Quiboloy and co-accused Cresente Canada to the New Quezon City Jail in Payatas and announced that their arraignment and pre-trial conference would be held on September 19. However, he remains detained in Camp Crame, while his four co-accused were transferred to the Pasig City Jail. The Pasig Court granted Quiboloy's petition for a medical furlough from November 8–16 at the Philippine Heart Center after suffering chest pain, arrhythmia and atrial fibrillation. The court extended the furlough until November 27 due to dental issues including an infected dental implant which affected his jaw.

On January 18, 2025, Quiboloy was hospitalized for pneumonia.

=== Complaints filed by Quiboloy and KJC members ===
==== Against Rappler, et al ====
In December 2021, Rappler published series of articles detailing accusations against Quiboloy including sexual abuse, trafficking and fraud. In connection with these, since January 2022, Kingdom of Jesus Christ officials filed a total of 53 counts of cyber libel against Rappler and its four journalists, and four resource persons including an Ateneo de Manila University professor and three former KJC members who turned as whistleblowers, before the City Prosecutor's offices in various cities in Mindanao, particularly in Cagayan de Oro (7 counts), Davao City (28), General Santos (7), Ozamiz (7) and Panabo (4); all were dismissed for lack of probable cause with those filed in Davao City the last to be dismissed in May.

==== Against Manny Pacquiao ====
Then senator and presidential candidate Manny Pacquiao cited charges of sexual abuse against Quiboloy as his reason for turning down an invitation for a presidential debate that was organized by the latter in February 2022. This was the subject of a cyber libel complaint filed by Quiboloy against Pacquiao, which was dismissed by Davao City prosecutors in September, stating the complainant's failure to present supporting evidence.

=== Social media bans ===
On June 21, 2023, the video-sharing platform YouTube terminated Quiboloy's channel due to an alleged community guidelines violation. This was later followed by similar bans on several other accounts owned and/or affiliated with Quiboloy, such as the SMNI News and Kingdom of Jesus Christ channels, which were also terminated on July 7.

The termination of Quiboloy's channels occurred following a tweet made by Mutahar Anas, a popular gaming YouTuber known as SomeOrdinaryGamers, tagging YouTube's support account on Twitter and bringing attention to the FBI's arrest warrant for Quiboloy. Google, in their later statements, said that these actions were in compliance with existing sanctions by the United States against Quiboloy. Quiboloy, not being upset by the termination, said in an interview by his own media network that he is "bulletproof" from his detractors including US authorities whom he accused of "political and religious persecution". Quiboloy and SMNI later created accounts on the alt-tech video service Rumble as well as an alternate account for SMNI on YouTube in defiance of the sanctions; the latter account was suspended by YouTube a few days later.

Also in July, China-based video-sharing service TikTok – also complying with US sanctions – banned Quiboloy's account.

On August 17, Quiboloy's accounts on Meta-owned social media platforms Facebook and Instagram were banned following a complaint from an anonymous source. Meta later clarified in a statement with Rappler that the ban was due to the "Dangerous Organizations and Individuals" policy as outlined in their terms of service, which also extends to third parties showing support or representation of Quiboloy and any organizations associated with him. On September 15, 2023, the SMNI News' Facebook page was deleted, in accordance to Meta's Dangerous Organizations and Individuals Policy; sockpuppet accounts representing SMNI are still in operation as of 2024, to which the Philippine National Police urged Facebook and YouTube to take down.

== See also ==
- Delusions of grandeur
- God complex
- List of messiah claimants
- List of people claimed to be Jesus
