= Philippine Senate investigation of Apollo Quiboloy =

Philippine Senate hearing on the Kingdom of Jesus Christ
- Date: January 23 – October 23, 2024 (9 months)
- Location: Pasay City
- Cause: Alleged abuses within the Kingdom of Jesus Christ
- Organized by: Committee on Women, Children, Family Relations and Gender Equality
- Participants: Senator Risa Hontiveros (panel chair); Former KJC members

In January 2024, the Committee on Women, Children, Family Relations and Gender Equality of the Senate of the Philippines initiated a public enquiry into abuses allegedly being committed within the Kingdom of Jesus Christ, abuses allegedly led by its pastor, Apollo Quiboloy.

The hearing was conducted in aid of legislation to determine the effectiveness of the current laws of the Philippines against human trafficking that involved religion. Quiboloy's camp insisted that the Senate cannot determine liability for alleged crimes.

The investigation concluded in October 2024.

== Background ==
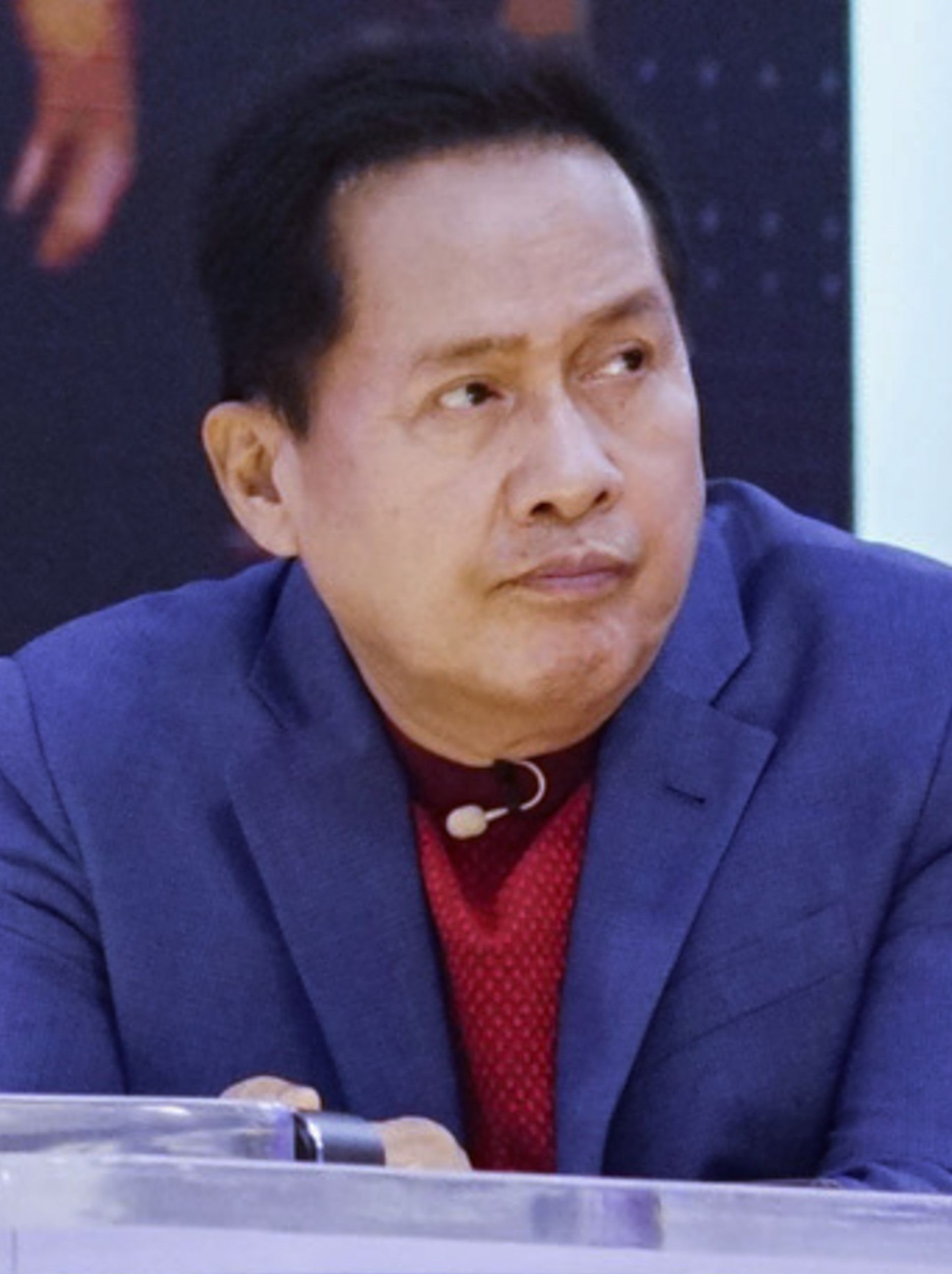
Apollo Quiboloy

Senator Risa Hontiveros filed Senate Resolution 884 on December 11, 2023, which sought an investigation of alleged "large-scale human trafficking, rape, sexual abuse and violence, and child abuse of the Kingdom of Jesus Christ" led by Pastor Apollo Quiboloy. The proposed investigation on the alleged abuses were to be in aid of legislation, to determine if the Philippines' "updated human trafficking laws are able to cover large-scale and systemic acts of trafficking done under the cover of a religious organization."

In the resolution, Hontiveros noted that Quiboloy was indicted by a California court in the United States for "conspiracy to engage in sex trafficking by force, fraud and coercion" in 2021. Hontiveros stressed the importance of an investigation, as the alleged abuses her office received happened in the territorial jurisdiction of the Philippines.

Hontiveros, on December 14, 2023, requested the Department of Justice led by Secretary Jesus Crispin Remulla to place an immigration lookout order on Quiboloy to ensure his attendance in the Senate hearing that had been set to commence on January 23, 2024.

Quiboloy's legal counsel, Ferdinand Topacio, insisted that the Senate had no jurisdiction in determining the liability of Quiboloy and his church on the alleged crimes raised by Hontiveros and urged her to file a criminal complaint instead if she had enough evidence. KJC ex-member Arlene Stone, who was now based in Minnesota in the United States, welcomed the probe. Stone stipulated that she herself would testify in the hearing.

== Hearing ==
=== First hearing ===
The Senate of the Philippines' hearing on the alleged abuses under the Kingdom of Jesus Christ (KJC) and Quiboloy began on January 23, 2024. The Senate Committee on Women, Children, Family Relations and Gender Equality oversaw the hearing, with Hontiveros as the panel chairperson. Hontiveros made comparisons between the KJC and the Socorro Bayanihan Services, a religious organization the Senate also investigated the previous year for similar alleged abuses.

Quiboloy, while invited, did not attend the hearing. In his stead was his legal counsel Melanio Elvis Balayan. Five former KJC members also testified during the hearing.

The panel then issued a subpoena against Quiboloy for his non-attendance. Hontiveros said that she had sent two invitations to Quiboloy but that these were ignored. She noted, however, that Quiboloy sent a letter to Senate president Juan Miguel Zubiri. She urged Quiboloy to personally answer the allegations hurled against him, further insisting that the hearing did not constitute religious persecution but was a simple enquiry into abuses that exploited one's religion or faith.

==== Allegations ====
The former KJC members involved in the complaint and their accounts and allegations were as follows:

- Alias Sofia and Nina: Ukrainian nationals who were serving as "pastorals" (close aides) to Quiboloy. Sofia joined the KJC in 2014 as a 21-year old while Nina was a member from 2012 to 2021. They alleged that Quiboloy sexually abused them and coerced them by threatening them with damnation in hell if they didn't oblige. Sofia linked an older pastoral by the name of Jacqueline Roy who advised her that she must commit the requested sexual acts with Quiboloy. Sofia started to resist upon learning that Quiboloy's other alleged victims included minors.
- Alias Amanda, baptized to the KJC in 2012 as a 15-year old. She left the church after alleging she was sexually abused by Quiboloy in September 2014. She was not able to continue her studies and consequentially work since Jose Maria College, her former school, was also KJC-owned and would not release her transcript of record.
- Alias Jerome, a former full-time member from 2004. He was ordered to sell and solicit as a minor, with all proceeds obliged to be remitted to the church. He testified that erring members, dubbed as "Serpent's Seeds", were told to hit their head on a wall until they were bloodied. He also alleged that Quiboloy's men also placed chili on members' eyes and private parts as punishment.
- Arlene Stone, ex-member based in the United States at the time of the hearing, who claimed to have been trafficked to Manila from Mindanao along with other teenage minors to sell merchandise in order to earn money for the KJC. She also alleged having been hit sixty times by Quiboloy for watching a movie.

=== Second hearing ===
The second hearing was conducted on February 19, 2024. Quiboloy again opted not to attend, ignoring the subpoena issued to him.

A witness who worked as a landscaper for Quiboloy at Glory Mountain in Davao City would testify that then President Rodrigo Duterte and then Mayor Sara Duterte received firearms from Quiboloy.

Other allegations raised included KJC members being offered "fake scholarships" and forced to beg for alms for the religious organization, and Sonshine Media Network International (SMNI) employees not receiving wages and mandatory benefits required by the government. A lawyer for Quiboloy's side reasoned that SMNI employees did receive compensation in a form of honorarium.

Also in attendance at the hearing, Senator Robin Padilla vouched for Quiboloy's character while insisting he was not taking sides, saying that the church never asked him for funds.

=== Third hearing ===
The third hearing was held on March 5, 2024. Because of Quiboloy's continued absence, Risa Hontiveros, chair of the investigating Senate committee, cited him in contempt under Section 18 of the Rules of the Senate and sought his arrest for repeated disobedience to the panel's subpoena. Robin Padilla and Imee Marcos, however, objected. In an order to show cause dated March 12, 2024, signed by Migz Zubiri and Hontiveros upon motion of the Chairman seconded by Koko Pimentel, Quiboloy was again cited in contempt. "You are hereby ordered to show cause within a non-extendible period of 48 hours from receipt of this Order why you should not be ordered arrested and detained at the Office of the Serjeant-at-arms (Lt. Gen. Roberto T. Ancan AFP)," the order stated.

On March 19, 2024, the Department of Justice filed child abuse and human trafficking charges against Quiboloy and co-accused Jackielyn W. Roy, Cresente Canada, Paulene Canada, Ingrid C. Canada, and Sylvia Cemane. The Information charged Quiboloy of Qualified Human Trafficking charges under Section 4 (a) of Republic Act No. 9208, the Anti-Trafficking in Persons Act of 2003 as amended, before a Pasig court. The charges under Section 5(b) and Section 10(a) of Republic Act 7610, the Special Protection of Children Against Abuse, Exploitation, and Discrimination Act, were also filed against Quiboloy before a Davao court. No bail was recommended for the charges. That same day, the Senate Sergeant-At-Arms was directed to implement the arrest order signed by Migz Zubiri against Quiboloy within 24 hours.

=== Fourth hearing ===
After Quiboloy's arrest on September 8, 2024, the fourth hearing was held on October 23, with Quiboloy and his five co-accused in attendance. At the hearing, Quiboloy denied the existence of the so-called "Angels of Death", which, according to his former followers, uses to silence his victims. Hontiveros also played an audio recording in which Quiboloy allegedly warned a certain Stephanie and her family that they would be killed for leaving the KJC.

In a news interview on October 24, Hontiveros said that the investigations concluded with the appearance of the "arrested Son of God".

== Reactions ==
=== Kingdom of Jesus Christ ===
Apollo Quiboloy did not appear at the hearings, maintaining that all charges and accusations against him and his church were false. On February 21, 2024, he released a statement accusing President Bongbong Marcos and First Lady Liza Araneta Marcos of conspiring with the United States government to silence and assassinate him. He alleged that the Central Intelligence Agency and Federal Bureau of Investigation of the United States had a plot on his life.

Prior to the third hearing on March 5, 2024, supporters of Quiboloy and the church held a protest outside the Senate building. They denounced the hearings as unfair for lack of witnesses who would vouch for the church and urged Senator Risa Hontiveros to resign from her position.

=== Legal actions ===
The Department of Justice announced on March 4, 2024 that it would be formally filing multiple charges of sexual abuse and human trafficking against Apollo Quiboloy.

=== Other linked personalities outside of the hearings ===
After the second hearing, Vice President Sara Duterte, without directly addressing the allegations against her and her father Rodrigo Duterte concerning Quiboloy, said that she would expect further "attacks" against her. She said that the holder of the Vice President's role had always been a target to future aspirants to the role of Philippine president.

=== Other Senators ===
Senators Imee Marcos, Bong Go, Robin Padilla, and Cynthia Villar signed a written objection in a failed attempt to override the Senate panel's motion to cite Quiboloy for contempt. JV Ejercito also initially signed the objection but later withdrew it. Ronald dela Rosa, along with Go and Padilla, joined a rally in support of Quiboloy.
