= 2023 Shakey's Super League National Invitationals =

2023 collegiate volleyball competition

Tournament details
- Dates: July 29 – August 13, 2023
- Teams: 12
- Venue: Filoil EcoOil Centre

Final positions
- Champions: De La Salle Lady Spikers (1st title)
- Runners-up: Adamson Lady Falcons
- Third place: UST Golden Tigresses
- Fourth place: Perpetual Lady Altas

Tournament awards
- MVP: Shevana Maria Nicola Laput
- Best Setter: Angelica Alcantara
- Best OH: Angeline Poyos; Alleah Jan Malaluan
- Best MB: Thea Allison Gagate; Amie Provido
- Best OPP: Shevana Maria Nicola Laput
- Best Libero: Ma. Bernadett Pepito

Tournament statistics
- Matches played: 23

The 2023 Shakey's Super League National Invitationals was the inaugural edition of the national collegiate competition organized by the Shakey's Super League and the second SSL tournament of 2023.

The tournament began on July 29 at the Filoil EcoOil Centre. This tournament showcased the top three teams of the recent volleyball tournaments of the NCAA and UAAP, alongside the top two teams from Luzon, Visayas, and Mindanao that qualified on the regional qualifiers.

== Qualified teams ==
The qualified teams for this tournament are the podium finishers of the NCAA and UAAP for Metro Manila, and the top two teams that qualified through the regional qualifiers in Luzon, Visayas, and Mindanao.

Team	School	League/Island Group	Qualified as	Previous appearances			Previous best performance
Team	School	League/Island Group	Qualified as	Total	First	Last	Previous best performance
Adamson Lady Falcons	Adamson University	UAAP	3rd UAAP team	0	None		None
Benilde Lady Blazers	De La Salle–College of Saint Benilde	NCAA	1st NCAA team	0	None		None
De La Salle Lady Spikers	De La Salle University	UAAP	1st UAAP team	0	None		None
DLSU-Dasma Lady Patriots	De La Salle University – Dasmariñas	Luzon	1st Luzon team	0	None		None
Enderun Lady Titans	Enderun Colleges	Luzon	2nd Luzon team	0	None		None
JMCF Lady Royals	Jose Maria College	Mindanao	2nd Mindanao team	0	None		None
Lyceum Lady Pirates	Lyceum of the Philippines University	NCAA	2nd NCAA team	0	None		None
NDDU Lady Kingfishers	Notre Dame of Dadiangas University	Mindanao	1st Mindanao team	0	None		None
~~NU Lady Bulldogs~~ ^{a}	~~National University~~	~~UAAP~~	~~2nd UAAP team~~	~~0~~	~~None~~		~~None~~
Perpetual Lady Altas	University of Perpetual Help System DALTA	NCAA	3rd NCAA team	0	None		None
USJ–R Lady Jaguars	University of San Jose–Recoletos	Visayas	2nd Visayas team	0	None		None
USPF Lady Panthers	University of Southern Philippines Foundation	Visayas	1st Visayas team	0	None		None
UST Golden Tigresses	University of Santo Tomas	UAAP	4th UAAP team	0	None		None

Note
a. The NU Lady Bulldogs were initially slated to join the competition. Still, they later withdrew as eight players of the team are set to represent the Philippines women's national volleyball team for the 2023 SEA Women's V.League and the 2023 Asian Women's Volleyball Championship.

== Pool composition ==
The teams are grouped via casting lots. Each pool will have 3 teams.

Pool A	Pool B	Pool C	Pool D
De La Salle Lady Spikers	DLSU-Dasma Lady Patriots	Adamson Lady Falcons	Benilde Lady Blazers
Perpetual Lady Altas	USJ–R Lady Jaguars	JMCF Lady Royals	Enderun Lady Titans
USPF Lady Panthers	UST Golden Tigresses	Lyceum Lady Pirates	NDDU Lady Kingfishers

== Venue ==
All matches
City of Manila
Filoil EcoOil Centre
Capacity: 6,000

== Preliminary round ==
- All times are Philippine Standard Time (UTC+8:00).
- The top two teams per pool advance to the Quarterfinal round.

=== Pool A ===
Pos	Team	Pld	W	L	Pts	SW	SL	SR	SPW	SPL	SPR	Qualification
1	DLSU Lady Spikers	2	2	0	6	6	0	MAX	150	88	1.705	Quarterfinal round
2	UPHSD Lady Altas	2	1	1	3	3	4	0.750	139	148	0.939	Quarterfinal round
3	USPF Lady Panthers	2	0	2	0	1	6	0.167	121	173	0.699	

Date	Time		Score		Set 1	Set 2	Set 3	Set 4	Set 5	Total	Report
Jul 29	12:00	DLSU Lady Spikers	3–0	UPHSD Lady Altas	25–11	25–17	25–12			75–40	
Jul 30	12:00	USPF Lady Panthers	1–3	UPHSD Lady Altas	25–23	12–25	20–25	16–25		73–98	
Aug 1	9:00	DLSU Lady Spikers	3–0	USPF Lady Panthers	25–14	25–15	25–19			75–48	

=== Pool B ===
Pos	Team	Pld	W	L	Pts	SW	SL	SR	SPW	SPL	SPR	Qualification
1	UST Golden Tigresses	2	2	0	6	6	0	MAX	150	75	2.000	Quarterfinal round
2	USJ-R Lady Jaguars	2	1	1	3	3	3	1.000	122	131	0.931	Quarterfinal round
3	DLSU-D Lady Patriots	2	0	2	0	0	6	0.000	84	150	0.560	

Date	Time		Score		Set 1	Set 2	Set 3	Set 4	Set 5	Total	Report
Jul 29	14:00	DLSU-D Lady Patriots	0–3	USJ-R Lady Jaguars	20–25	18–25	18–25			56–75	
Jul 30	16:00	USJ-R Lady Jaguars	0–3	UST Golden Tigresses	15–25	16–25	16–25			47–75	
Aug 1	14:00	UST Golden Tigresses	3–0	DLSU-D Lady Patriots	25–10	25–10	25–8			75–28	

=== Pool C ===
Pos	Team	Pld	W	L	Pts	SW	SL	SR	SPW	SPL	SPR	Qualification
1	AdU Lady Falcons	2	2	0	6	6	0	MAX	150	102	1.471	Quarterfinal round
2	JMCF Lady Royals	2	1	1	3	3	4	0.750	120	88	1.364	Quarterfinal round
3	LPU Lady Pirates	2	0	2	0	1	6	0.167	148	174	0.851	

Date	Time		Score		Set 1	Set 2	Set 3	Set 4	Set 5	Total	Report
Jul 29	16:00	AdU Lady Falcons	3–0	JMCF Lady Royals	25–17	25–11	25–17			75–45	
Jul 30	9:00	LPU Lady Pirates	1–3	JMCF Lady Royals	26–24	19–25	22–25	24–26		91–100	
Aug 1	12:00	AdU Lady Falcons	3–0	LPU Lady Pirates	25–17	25–18	25–22			75–57	

=== Pool D ===
Pos	Team	Pld	W	L	Pts	SW	SL	SR	SPW	SPL	SPR	Qualification
1	CSB Lady Blazers	2	2	0	6	6	0	MAX	150	87	1.724	Quarterfinal round
2	EC Lady Titans	2	1	1	3	3	3	1.000	111	136	0.816	Quarterfinal round
3	NDDU Lady Kingfishers	2	0	2	0	0	6	0.000	114	152	0.750	

Date	Time		Score		Set 1	Set 2	Set 3	Set 4	Set 5	Total	Report
Jul 29	9:00	EC Lady Titans	3–0	NDDU Lady Kingfisher	27–25	25–22	25–14			77–61	
Jul 30	14:00	NDDU Lady Kingfishers	0–3	CSB Lady Blazers	20–25	15–25	18–25			53–75	
Aug 1	16:00	EC Lady Titans	0–3	CSB Lady Blazers	11–25	13–25	10–25			34–75	

== Final round ==
- All times are Philippine Standard Time (UTC+8:00).
- Quarterfinals and Semifinals are single elimination games.
- Finals is best-of-three series.

Quarterfinals
Aug 2
A1	De La Salle Lady Spikers	3
C2	JMCF Lady Royals	0
Aug 2
B1	UST Golden Tigresses	3
D2	Enderun Lady Titans	1
Aug 2
C1	Adamson Lady Falcons	3
B2	USJ–R Lady Jaguars	0
Aug 2
D1	Benilde Lady Blazers	2
A2	Perpetual Lady Altas	3

Semifinals
Aug 4
A1	De La Salle Lady Spikers	3
B1	UST Golden Tigresses	2
Aug 4
C1	Adamson Lady Falcons	3
A2	Perpetual Lady Altas	0

Championship
A1	De La Salle Lady Spikers	2	3	3
C1	Adamson Lady Falcons	3	0	0
Third place
B1	UST Golden Tigresses	3	3
A2	Perpetual Lady Altas	0	1

=== Quarterfinals ===
Date	Time		Score		Set 1	Set 2	Set 3	Set 4	Set 5	Total	Report
Aug 2	9:00	De La Salle Lady Spikers	3–0	JMCF Lady Royals	25–18	25–14	25–19			75–51	
Aug 2	12:00	UST Golden Tigresses	3–1	Enderun Lady Titans	25–13	25–16	21–25	25–14		96–68	
Aug 2	14:00	Adamson Lady Falcons	3–0	USJ–R Lady Jaguars	25–9	25–11	25–23			75–43	
Aug 2	16:00	Benilde Lady Blazers	2–3	Perpetual Lady Altas	16–25	25–20	26–28	25–16	12–15	104–104	

=== Semifinals ===
Date	Time		Score		Set 1	Set 2	Set 3	Set 4	Set 5	Total	Report
Aug 4	14:00	Adamson Lady Falcons	3–0	Perpetual Lady Altas	25–19	25–21	25–16			75–56	
Aug 4	16:00	De La Salle Lady Spikers	3–2	UST Golden Tigresses	22–25	25–18	14–25	26–24	26–24	113–116	

=== Finals ===
==== Bronze Medal Match ====
Date	Time		Score		Set 1	Set 2	Set 3	Set 4	Set 5	Total	Report
Aug 9	14:00	UST Golden Tigresses	3–0	Perpetual Lady Altas	25–15	25–22	25–15			75–52	
Aug 12	14:00	UST Golden Tigresses	3–1	Perpetual Lady Altas	25–20	25–21	17–25	25–13		92–79	

==== Gold Medal Match ====
Date	Time		Score		Set 1	Set 2	Set 3	Set 4	Set 5	Total	Report
Aug 9	16:00	De La Salle Lady Spikers	2–3	Adamson Lady Falcons	25–22	17–25	25–17	25–27	14–16	106–107	
Aug 12	16:00	De La Salle Lady Spikers	3–0	Adamson Lady Falcons	25–23	25–12	25–18			75–53	
Aug 13	16:00	De La Salle Lady Spikers	3–0	Adamson Lady Falcons	25–19	25–22	25–17			75–58	

== Final standings ==
Rank	Team
1st place, gold medalist(s)	De La Salle Lady Spikers
2nd place, silver medalist(s)	Adamson Lady Falcons
3rd place, bronze medalist(s)	UST Golden Tigresses
4	Perpetual Lady Altas
5–8	Benilde Lady Blazers
5–8	Enderun Lady Titans
5–8	JMCF Lady Royals
5–8	USJ–R Lady Jaguars
9–12	Lyceum Lady Pirates
9–12	USPF Lady Panthers
9–12	NDDU Lady Kingfishers
9–12	DLSU-Dasma Lady Patriots

2023 SSL National Invitationals champions

De La Salle Lady Spikers
1st title

Team Roster
Maria Jessa Ordiales, Thea Gagate, Sophia Denise Sindayen, Alleiah Jan Malaluan, Shevana Maria Nicola Laput, Gillianna Jenya Louise Torres, Julia Cyrille Coronel (c), Maicah Larroza, Julyana Tolentino, Amie Provido, Baby Jyne Soreño, Julieanne Rose Levina, Marite Espina, Ela Marjanna Raagas, Lyka Mae De Leon, Kim Yra Rocha, Katrina Del Castillo, Caroline Santos, Julianne Margarita Javelosa
Head Coach
Ramil de Jesus

== Awards and medalists ==
=== Individual awards ===
Award	Player	Team	Ref
Most Valuable Player	Shevana Maria Nicola Laput	De La Salle Lady Spikers	
1st Best Outside Spiker	Angeline Poyos	UST Golden Tigresses	
2nd Best Outside Spiker	Alleah Jan Malaluan	De La Salle Lady Spikers	
1st Best Middle Blocker	Thea Allison Gagate	De La Salle Lady Spikers	
2nd Best Middle Blocker	Amie Provido	De La Salle Lady Spikers	
Best Opposite Spiker	Shevana Maria Nicola Laput	De La Salle Lady Spikers	
Best Setter	Angelica Alcantara	Adamson Lady Falcons	
Best Libero	Ma. Bernadett Pepito	UST Golden Tigresses	

=== Medalists ===
Gold	Silver	Bronze
De La Salle Lady Spikers CORONEL, Julia Cyrille (c); ORDIALES, Ma. Jessa; GAGATE, Thea Allison; SINDAYEN, Sophia Denise; MALALUAN, Alleiah Jan; LAPUT, Shevana Nicola; TORRES, Gillianna Jenya Louise; LARROZA, Princess Maicah; TOLENTINO, Julyana; PROVIDO, Amie; SOREÑO, Baby Jyne; LEVINA, Julianne Rose; ESPINA, Marite; RAAGAS, Ela Marjanna; DE LEON, Lyka May; ROCHA, Kim Yra; DEL CASTILLO, Katrina; SANTOS, Caroline; JAVELOSA, Julianne Margarita Head Coach: Ramil De Jesus	Adamson Lady Falcons ALMONTE, Lucille May (c); YANDOC, Nikka Sophia Ruth; LOPENA, Julea Dawn; MARCE, Aliah; ALCANTARA, Angelica; ANCHETA, Sharya Nicole; NIQUE, May Ann; CUENCA, Jaochen Ghail; ADOLFO, Antonette; LALONGISIP, Ma. Rochelle; VERDEFLOR, Ma. Joahna Karen; TORING, Renella Jade; MANUEL, Juris Anne Clare; VILLEGAS, Jen Kylene; ALJIBE, Princess Eloisa; JUEGOS, Ayesha Tara; BASCON, Red; TORING, Lorene Grace; APOSAGA, Athea Jamine Head Coach: John Philip Yude	UST Golden Tigresses PEPITO, Ma. Bernadett (c); POYOS, Angeline Inson; TAPIA, Ypril Jyrhine; LIMPOT, Alyzandrianne; TAN, Cristabelle Gracille; BACALSO, Angeli; CAASI, Karylle Ann; OSIS, Francine Anne; JACKSON, Mary Angela; GULA, Xyza Rufel; ABBU, Athena Sopia; PERDIDO, Jonna Chris; APOSTOL, Elisha Julienne; CORONADO, Mary Joe; CARBALLO, Ma. Cassandra Rae; JURADO, Regina Grace; BANAGUA, Mary Margaret; CORDORA, Kyla Elvi Dale; HILONGO, Maribeth Head Coach: Emilio Reyes Jr.
