= Amorphous globosus =

Malformation in veterinary medicine

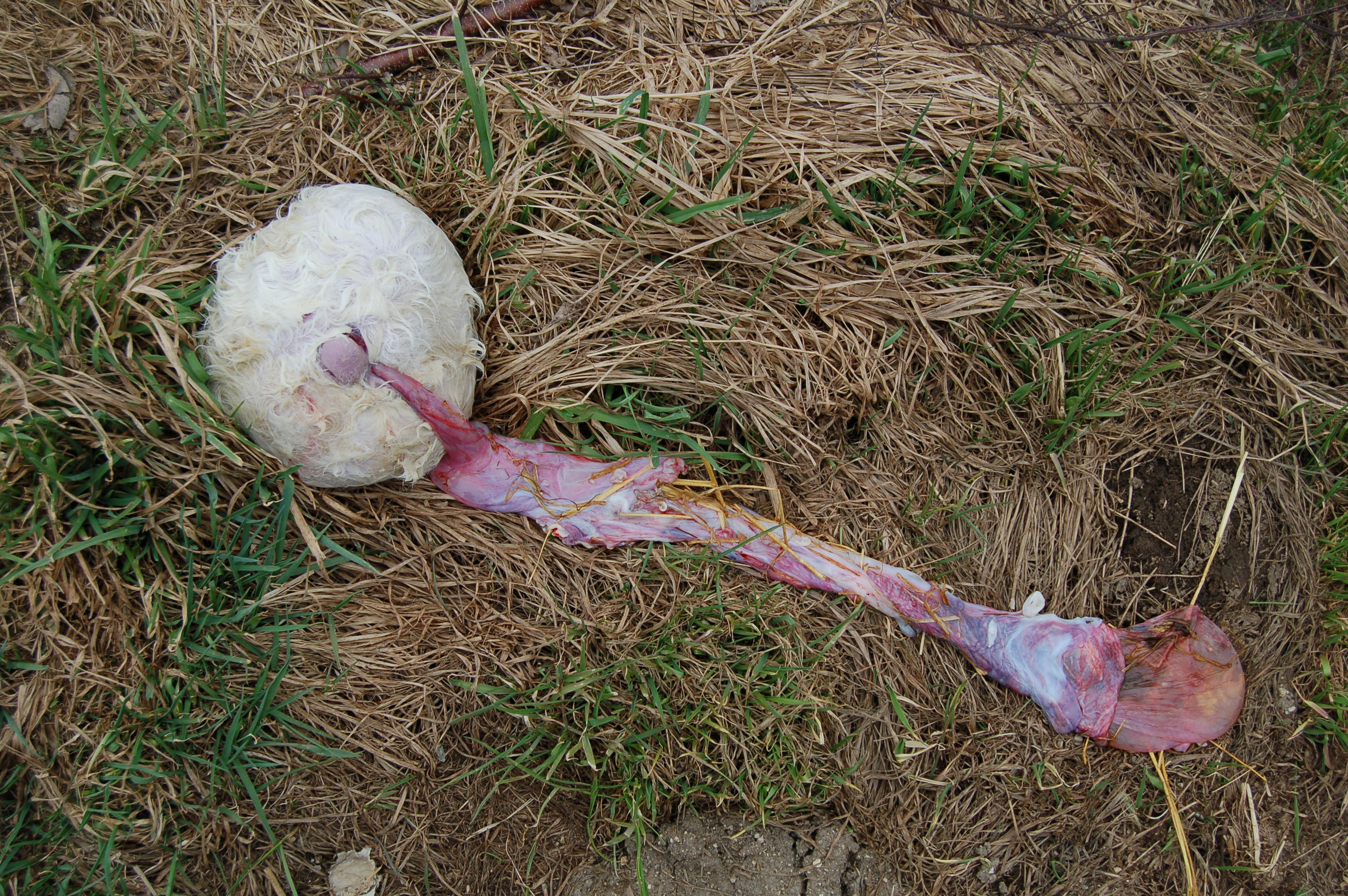
A bovine amorphus globosus

An amorphous (or amorphus) globosus (from Greek αμορφή (amorphē, 'formless') and Latin globus ('sphere')), also known as a globosus amorphus, or an amorphous globosus monster, is a fetus malformation in veterinary medicine, particularly in domestic cattle, resulting in the formation of an approximately spherical structure covered with hairy skin. An amorphous globosus contains parts of all three germ layers; the differentiation of its contents can vary greatly. An amorphus globosus is not viable due to the lack of functional organs.

== Origin ==
The teratological reasons for the development of amorphus globosus are not fully understood, but it is believed that the malformation is generally associated with twin gestation, in which one embryo does not develop normally. In two cases, the karyotype of the amorphus was identical to its normally developing twin, while in another case, the karyotype deviated from the normal twin, so an emergence from fraternal twins also seems possible.

== Distribution ==
Amorphus globosus is more common in livestock than generally assumed. It occurs most commonly in cattle, but there are also case reports in goats and horses. A case of amorphous globosus has also been described in human medicine, where it was also a twin pregnancy.

== See also ==
- Birth defect – Condition present at birth regardless of cause
- Schmallenberg orthobunyavirus – Species of virus
- Spherical cow – Humorous concept in scientific models
- Twin reversed arterial perfusion – Rare complication of monochorionic twin pregnancies
