= Trisomy 16 =

Partial or complete triplication of chromosome 16

- Specialty: Medical genetics
- Duration: Lifelong
- Types: Full, mosaic
- Causes: Nondisjunction
- Diagnostic method: Chorionic villus sampling, amniocentesis
- Prognosis: Incompatible with life
- Frequency: 6% of miscarriages

Trisomy 16 is a chromosomal abnormality in which there are 3 copies of chromosome 16 rather than two. It is the most common autosomal trisomy leading to miscarriage, and the second most common chromosomal cause (closely following X-chromosome monosomy). About 6% of miscarriages have trisomy 16. Those mostly occur between 8 and 15 weeks after the last menstrual period.

A child cannot be born alive with an extra copy of this chromosome present in all cells (full trisomy 16). It is possible, however, for a child to be born alive with the mosaic form.

== Chromosome 16 ==
Normally humans have 2 copies of chromosome 16, one inherited from each parent. This chromosome represents almost 3% of all DNA in cells.

== Screening ==
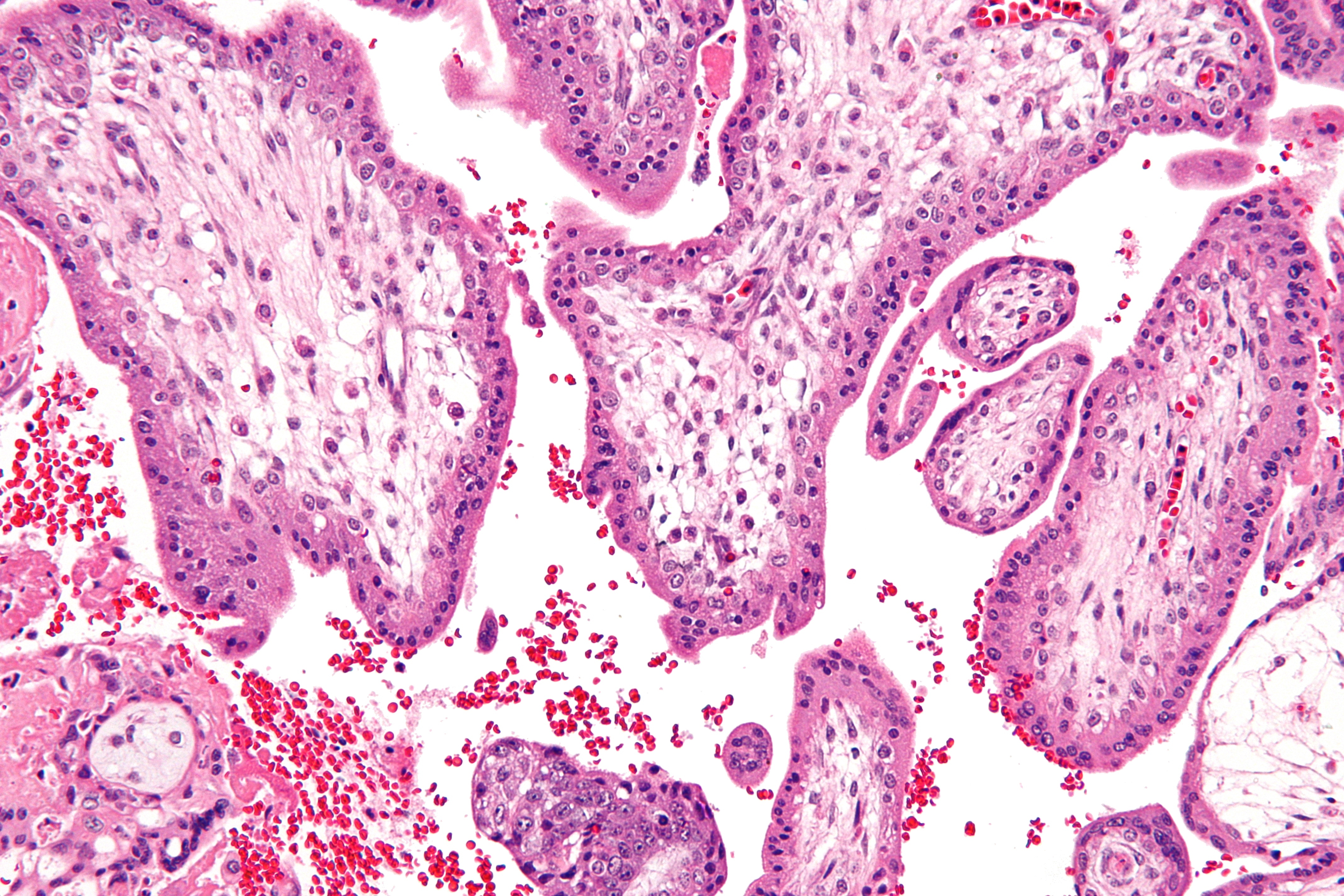
Micrograph showing chorionic villi-the tissue that is collected in CVS.

During pregnancy, women can be screened by chorionic villus sampling and amniocentesis to detect trisomy 16. With the advent of noninvasive techniques for detecting aneuploidy, prenatal screening with tests using Next Generation Sequencing can be utilised before invasive techniques.

== Full trisomy 16 ==
Full trisomy 16 is incompatible with life and most of the time it results in miscarriage during the first trimester. This occurs when all of the cells in the body contain an extra copy of chromosome 16.

== Mosaic trisomy 16 ==
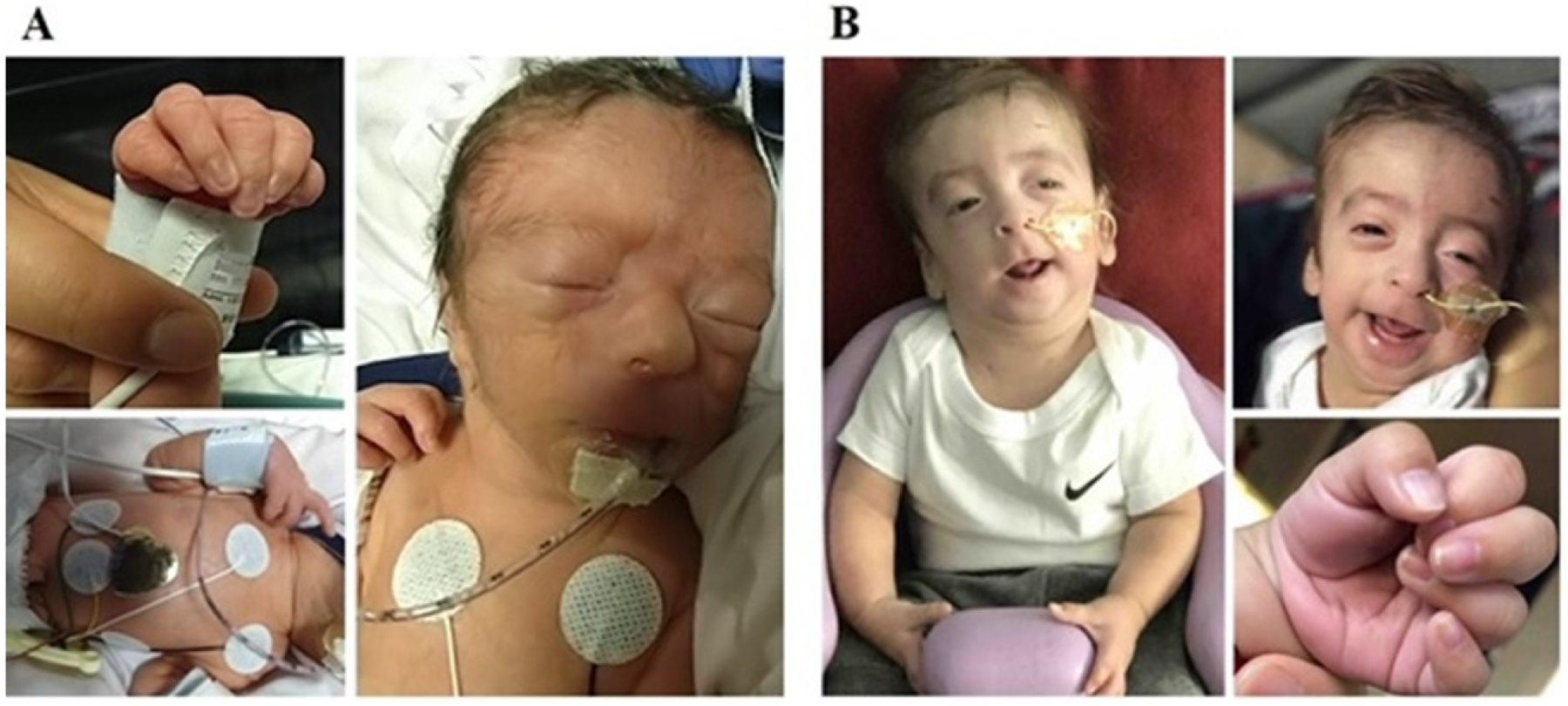
Dysmorphic facial features of a child with Mosaic trisomy 16q12.2q24.3, including camptodactyly and congenital heart defects.

Mosaic trisomy 16, a rare chromosomal disorder, is not compatible with life, but in rare cases a baby can be born alive. This happens when only some of the cells in the body contain the extra copy of chromosome 16. Some of the consequences include slow growth before birth.

=== Prenatal diagnosis ===
During prenatal diagnosis, the levels of trisomy in fetal-placental tissues can be analyzed. These levels can be predictors of outcomes in mosaic trisomy 16 pregnancies. In a study of prenatal diagnosis cases, there were 0.01% of live births with an average of 35.7 weeks gestational age. About 50% of them had malformations. The most common malformations were CSD, ASD, and hypospadias. However, confined placental trisomy 16 does not always result in anatomical abnormalities.
