= Total body disruption =

Acute destruction of the body

Total body disruption is the acute, fatal destruction of the body. Synonymous terminology from the field of emergency medical services (EMS) is gross dismemberment.

Commonly referred to as being "blown up", "blown apart", or "dashed to pieces" in older literature, total body disruption may be caused by such traumas as being subject to a powerful explosion, uncontrolled decompression, or implosion. It is the most severe type of blast injury. Gross dismemberment may also be caused by a fall at terminal velocity onto a solid surface or water; from being within a high-speed crashing object (as in high-speed aircraft crashes); or by high pressure differentials, where the body is violently propelled (as in diver Truls Hellevik in the Byford Dolphin diving bell accident) or rapidly compressed (as in all five victims of the Titan submersible implosion).

Total body disruption is invariably fatal to most complex life, such as humans, as structures necessary for continued survival are destroyed or otherwise rendered non-functional. In the case of humans, the brain (if not destroyed) is deprived of oxygenated blood, while other organs (if not destroyed) are deprived of the involuntary functions. In some jurisdictions, gross dismemberment is an assessment where EMS personnel may declare death on scene.

Incomplete, initially unidentifiable human remains caused by total body disruption may be referred to as "disassociated portions".

== See also ==
- Decapitation
- Dismemberment
- Hemicorporectomy
- Incompatible with life
- Blowing from a gun
