= Incompatible with life =

Circumstances that render life impossible

The term incompatible with life is used in circumstances of injury or developmental disorder that render life impossible.

== Injury and death ==
Examples of injuries incompatible with life are decapitation or gross dismemberment. Other circumstances that are regarded as self-evidently incompatible with life include traumatic hemicorporectomy, decomposition, incineration, hypostasis and rigor mortis; in these circumstances, paramedics and other similar workers may be allowed to regard a person as dead in the absence of a physician.

== Fetal abnormality ==
Developmental disorders are considered incompatible with life when essential structures or biological functions necessary for the preservation of life are not formed or certain aneuploidies are present; they may result in spontaneous abortion, stillbirth, or neonatal death. Examples of conditions generally considered incompatible with life include Potter's syndrome, Trisomy 16, and anencephaly. Where disorders incompatible with life are found before birth, patients may elect to have an induced abortion.

The definition of which conditions are incompatible with life can change as medicine advances, such as where medical techniques have made it possible for some people born with some conditions generally regarded as incompatible with life such as Potter's syndrome to survive. There have even been extremely rare cases of short-term survival into infancy with conditions as severe as anencephaly.

== See also ==
- Dead on arrival
- List of fetal abnormalities
