= Prison furlough =

Authorized temporary release of a prisoner

A prison furlough is an authorized temporary release granted to a prison inmate during their period of incarceration. These programs form part of broader rehabilitation and reintegration strategies across various justice systems, most commonly in the United States and Europe.

== United States ==
In the United States, furloughs are sometimes granted for medical reasons or to allow inmates to attend funerals or make contact for employment upon release. There is some evidence that furloughs reduce violent outbursts, although there have also been high-profile cases in which furloughed prisoners committed crimes while on furlough, returned late, or remained at large.

In the Federal Bureau of Prisons, furloughs are considered neither a reward for good behavior nor a means to shorten a criminal sentence, but are intended strictly to further correctional goals.

== Spain ==
Spain distinguishes between ordinary and extraordinary prison leaves. Ordinary furloughs support family ties, community contact, and preparation for release. Inmates serving in closed prisons may receive up to 36 days of leave annually, typically in 3-6 day blocks. Eligibility usually requires serving at least one-quarter of their sentence, classified in a medium-security regime, and demonstrating good behavior. Research has shown leaves reduce recidivism: Catalan inmates who took leave had a 20.5% recidivism rate which is improved from 38.6% recidivism rate for those who did not take a leave during their period of incarceration.

== Germany ==
Germany offers both day-release (Ausgang) and multi-day furloughs in open and closed prisons. Open-prison systems allow inmates to work or study outside daily, returning at night.

The German Prison Act (1976), reinforced by federal court rulings, mandates rehabilitation and normalization, making prison conditions resemble life outside as closely as possible.

== Scandinavia ==
These nations adopt normalization philosophies. In the Swedish Prison and Probation Service, temporary leaves are part of structured reintegration, often through open prisons. Norway allows home and community visits with supervision. Finland similarly uses supervised furloughs to facilitate reentry.

== Japan ==
Japan permits temporary leaves largely for humanitarian reasons including family emergencies and medical issues. The Japanese prison system authorizes day leave and furloughs up to seven days for those who have served at least six months and are placed in open-type institutions. However, these are highly supervised and granted less frequently compared to European counterparts.
