= Kingdom of Jesus Christ (church) =

Philippine-based Restorationist church

Kingdom of Jesus Christ, The Name Above Every Name
- Seal
- Abbreviation: KOJC, KJC
- Classification: Christianity
- Orientation: Restorationist
- Theology: Nontrinitarian
- Executive Pastor: Marlon Acobo
- Media arm: Sonshine Media Network International
- Headquarters: Buhangin, Davao City, Philippines
- Founder: Apollo Quiboloy
- Origin: September 1, 1985; 41 years ago Agdao, Davao City, Philippines
- Separated from: United Pentecostal Church of the Philippines
- Members: 5,000–8 million (2024)
- Aid organization: Children's Joy Foundation; Sonshine Philippines Movement
- Tertiary institutions: Jose Maria College
- Publications: Pinas
- Official website: kingdomofjesuschrist.net

The Kingdom of Jesus Christ (KOJC or KJC), officially the Kingdom of Jesus Christ, The Name Above Every Name, Inc., is a Philippine-based nontrinitarian Restorationist church. It was founded by pastor Apollo Quiboloy, who styles himself as the "Appointed Son of God". Quiboloy, who is currently in prison, is alleged to have conducted numerous sexual abuses of children who he forces to have intercourse with him "in the name of God", aided by his close ultra-religious allies.

The members of the church refer to their community as a "Kingdom Nation". The church claims to have eight million members worldwide, although third parties claim the number of members is as low as 7,000.

It has been the subject of various controversies, with critics calling it a cult and its founder having been indicted for criminal charges in the United States by the Federal Bureau of Investigation (FBI). In 2024, the church, its founder, and SMNI News Channel became the subject of scrutiny and inquiry by the Philippine government for several alleged violations and unlawful actions, including sexual exploitation of children. Quiboloy was arrested after raids of the church in September 2024.

== History ==
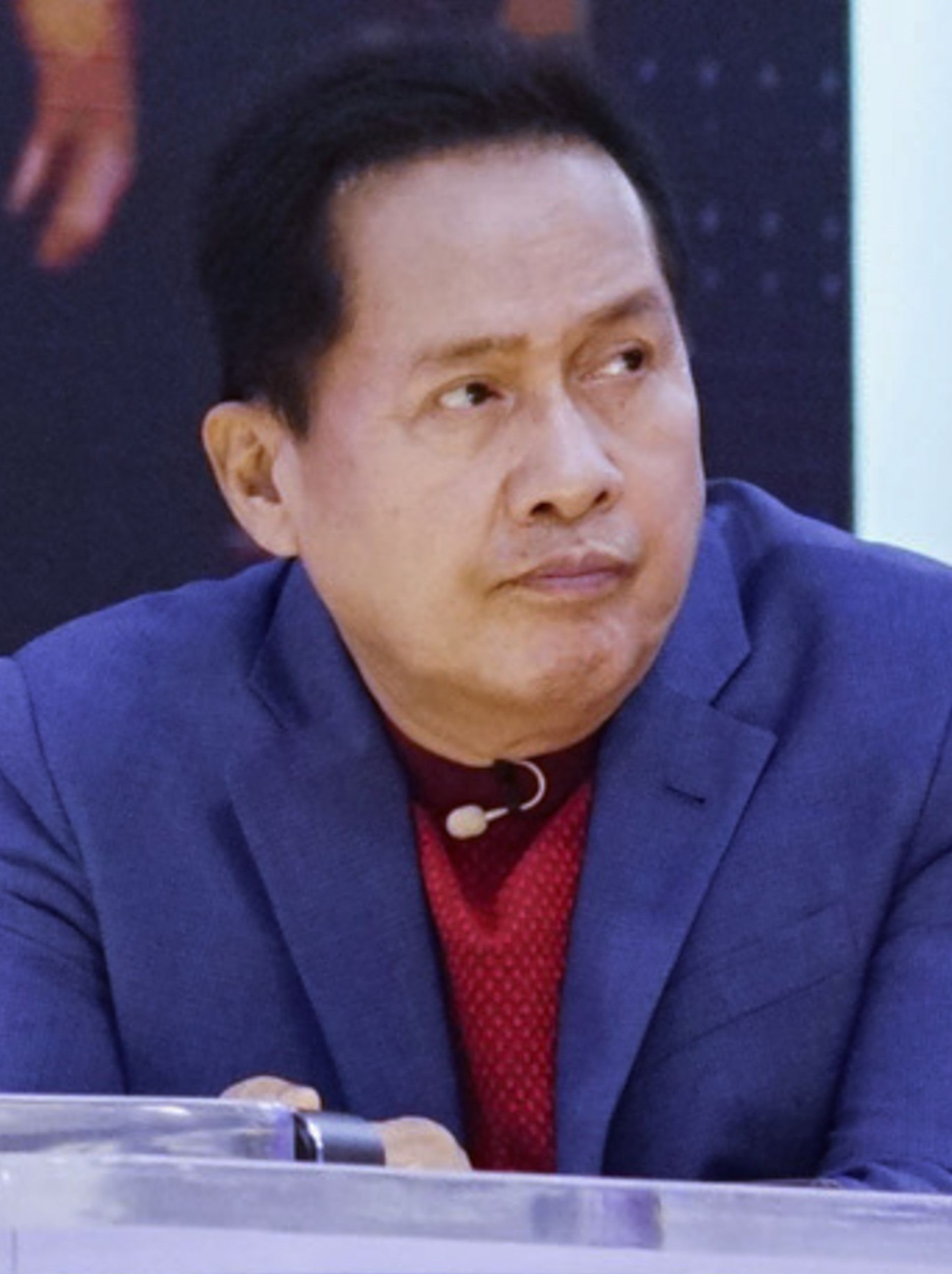
Apollo Quiboloy, the KOJC's founder and executive pastor.

Before the establishment of the Kingdom of Jesus Christ (KOJC) religious group, its founder Apollo Quiboloy was said to have gone on an exile to Tamayong for five years and later at Sitio Kitbog at the foot of Mount Matutum in South Cotabato. Quiboloy says that it was revelations from God through his dreams which led him to the foundation of the KOJC.

In fact, Quiboloy is a former member of the United Pentecostal Church of the Philippines, a Oneness Pentecostal denomination.

Apollo Quiboloy's father, José, was already a Protestant (a member of the Christian and Missionary Alliance), but converted to Oneness Pentecostalism with four sons, who all became preachers and leaders in the United Pentecostal Church of the Philippines (UPCP), the largest Filipino Oneness Pentecostal church and affiliate of the U.S.-based United Pentecostal Church International. Quiboloy became president of the powerful UPCP youth organization in 1974, but was expelled from the UPCP in 1979 for unorthodox teachings. He repented, apologized, and was accepted back into the fold in 1980 as pastor of the Agdao Church in Davao City, one of the historical UPCP churches.

In 1985, Quiboloy was put again under investigation by the UPCP for his arrogant attitudes towards other pastors. Rather than submitting to trial, he left the UPCP with some 15 followers on September 1, 1985, and started his own denomination.

Quiboloy's church started on September 1, 1985, and Quiboloy's prayer house was situated along Villamor Street in Agdao, Davao City.

On March 9, 2024, Sonshine Media Network International announced on X that former President Rodrigo Duterte was appointed as the KOJC's "administrator for all of its properties." SMNI has not released any proof or document to back this announcement.

Starting on August 24, 2024, the Philippine National Police conducted a series of raids against the KOJC compound in Davao City.

== Beliefs ==
The KOJC believes that its founder, Apollo Quiboloy, is the "Appointed Son of God". A self-described account of Quiboloy's birth involves God coming to his mother as a cloud to declare him as his son. Members of the church, also called "Kingdom citizens", believe that salvation is exclusive to its members. Such belief has been made as counter to mainstream Christianity.

== Membership ==
The KOJC claims to have 8 million members worldwide in 2024. However this was disputed by former member Arlene Stone who states there are only 7,000 to 8,000 members worldwide from an unspecified international KOJC member. The Philippine National Police also supports this claim, stating that there are only 8,000 active members. In the Philippines, the KOJC is not among the explicitly recorded religious affiliations for respondents in the 2020 census by the Philippine Statistics Authority.

== Linked organizations ==
Organizations like the Children's Joy Foundation and the Sonshine Philippines Movement are connected to the KOJC. The Children's Joy Foundation claims to "providing humanitarian aid to destitute children", while the Sonshine Philippines Movement stated goals is to be "involved in reforestation and disaster-relief efforts".

== Controversies ==
=== Abuse allegations ===
==== 2020 U.S. human trafficking raids ====
On January 29, 2020, the Federal Bureau of Investigation (FBI) raided KOJC offices in California, Texas, and Hawaii, after receiving complaints by former members that the church has been committing immigration fraud.

According to testimonies taken by the FBI, the KOJC has conducted 82 sham marriages in the past 20 years in order to keep them illegally in the United States. They said that the victims were invited as guests to a fundraiser concert for the Children's Joy Foundation, one of the church's charity arms. Once they arrived, they were forced to solicit donations on the streets and sell pastries, such as Krispy Kreme doughnuts, claiming that they were raising funds for the church, receiving little to no pay and were met with steep quota requirements. One of the victims even said that young church workers were physically or psychologically abused if they did not work well during incredible hours.

They allegedly received punishments, such as paddling or isolation in a walled room for three to five days while being denied food and water and listened to pre-recorded sermons of the church. One victim was even forced to shave her head and wear an orange shirt with "SOS" or "Son of Satan" in the back.

Three people — Guia Cabactulan, Marissa Duenas, and Amanda Estopare — were arrested and charged with conspiracy to commit immigration fraud. Both Cabactulan and Duenas were arrested in Van Nuys, California, while Estopare was arrested in Norfolk, Virginia.

Church officials, however, said that the investigation is based on testimony from disgruntled former church members who were allowed to stay in the country longer in exchange for their testimony.

==== U.S. child sex trafficking indictment ====
In 2021, Quiboloy was indicted of child sex trafficking. Prosecutors alleged that he, along with other members of his church, sexually and physically abused minors as young as 12, forcing children into having sex with him through so-called "night duties" or else face "eternal damnation" and more physical abuses. His wealth was alleged to be ill-gotten. It was also alleged that he abused church donations for his own gain.

=== Termination of YouTube channel ===
On July 7, 2023, YouTube terminated the channel of the KOJC, along with its media outfit, Sonshine Media Network International, as well as one of its programs. That of Quiboloy, on the other hand, had been terminated on June 21. Google, in its statement, said that these actions are in compliance with "applicable sanctions laws" of the United States which, in 2022, had imposed sanctions on Quiboloy under Executive Order No. 13818 for his alleged involvement in human rights abuses.
