= List of longest-running Philippine television series =

This is a list of the longest-running Philippine television series, ordered by number of years the show has been aired. This list includes only programs aired ten years and above. Some shows listed below include the years that the show did not air.

== Legend ==
Series shaded in light blue are currently in production.

== 60-69 years ==
Length	Number of seasons	Series	Network	First broadcast	Last broadcast	Number of episodes	Notes
60 years	N/A	The World Tonight	ABS-CBN	November 21, 1966	September 22, 1972	N/A	Longest-running English-language newscast. Note: The newscast did not air from 1972 to 1986 and again from August to October 1999. The show had a weekend edition until 2020 and on November 30, 2024, in the ABS-CBN News Channel (ANC), citing ABS-CBN's announcement to lay off another batch of employees, halted its Sunday newscasts in 2020, and later Saturday newscasts in 2024, and financial difficulties caused by a decline in advertising revenue.
60 years	N/A	The World Tonight	ABS-CBN	September 15, 1986	August 13, 1999	N/A	Longest-running English-language newscast. Note: The newscast did not air from 1972 to 1986 and again from August to October 1999. The show had a weekend edition until 2020 and on November 30, 2024, in the ABS-CBN News Channel (ANC), citing ABS-CBN's announcement to lay off another batch of employees, halted its Sunday newscasts in 2020, and later Saturday newscasts in 2024, and financial difficulties caused by a decline in advertising revenue.
60 years	N/A	The World Tonight	ANC	May 1, 1996	present	N/A	Longest-running English-language newscast. Note: The newscast did not air from 1972 to 1986 and again from August to October 1999. The show had a weekend edition until 2020 and on November 30, 2024, in the ABS-CBN News Channel (ANC), citing ABS-CBN's announcement to lay off another batch of employees, halted its Sunday newscasts in 2020, and later Saturday newscasts in 2024, and financial difficulties caused by a decline in advertising revenue.
60 years	N/A	The World Tonight	Kapamilya Channel	July 27, 2020	present	N/A	Longest-running English-language newscast. Note: The newscast did not air from 1972 to 1986 and again from August to October 1999. The show had a weekend edition until 2020 and on November 30, 2024, in the ABS-CBN News Channel (ANC), citing ABS-CBN's announcement to lay off another batch of employees, halted its Sunday newscasts in 2020, and later Saturday newscasts in 2024, and financial difficulties caused by a decline in advertising revenue.
60 years	N/A	The World Tonight	All TV	January 2, 2026	present	N/A	Longest-running English-language newscast. Note: The newscast did not air from 1972 to 1986 and again from August to October 1999. The show had a weekend edition until 2020 and on November 30, 2024, in the ABS-CBN News Channel (ANC), citing ABS-CBN's announcement to lay off another batch of employees, halted its Sunday newscasts in 2020, and later Saturday newscasts in 2024, and financial difficulties caused by a decline in advertising revenue.

== 50–59 years ==
Length	Number of seasons	Series	Network	First broadcast	Last broadcast	Number of episodes	Notes
51 years	N/A	Damayan Ngayon	ABS-CBN	October 20, 1969	September 21, 1972	N/A	Longest-running public service show; previously known as Damayan. Note: The show did not air from 1972 to 1975 and again from 2010 to 2017.
51 years	N/A	Damayan Ngayon	PTV	December 1, 1975	November 20, 2010	N/A	Longest-running public service show; previously known as Damayan. Note: The show did not air from 1972 to 1975 and again from 2010 to 2017.
51 years	N/A	Damayan Ngayon	PTV	October 6, 2017	2020	N/A	Longest-running public service show; previously known as Damayan. Note: The show did not air from 1972 to 1975 and again from 2010 to 2017.
51 years	N/A	Jesus Miracle Crusade	IBC	February 14, 1975	1988	N/A	Also known as Oras ng Himala.
51 years	N/A	Jesus Miracle Crusade	GMA	1988	2002	N/A	Also known as Oras ng Himala.
51 years	N/A	Jesus Miracle Crusade	NBN/PTV	1986	1995	N/A	Also known as Oras ng Himala.
51 years	N/A	Jesus Miracle Crusade	NBN/PTV	2007	present	N/A	Also known as Oras ng Himala.
50 years	N/A	Kapwa Ko Mahal Ko	GMA	December 1, 1975	present	N/A	Longest-running public service show.

== 40–49 years ==
Length	Number of seasons	Series	Network	First broadcast	Last broadcast	Number of episodes	Notes
47 years	N/A	Eat Bulaga!	RPN	July 30, 1979	February 17, 1989	14,647 (as of October 17, 2026)	Longest-running noontime variety show.
47 years	N/A	Eat Bulaga!	ABS-CBN	February 18, 1989	January 27, 1995	14,647 (as of October 17, 2026)	Longest-running noontime variety show.
47 years	N/A	Eat Bulaga!	GMA	January 28, 1995	January 5, 2024	14,647 (as of October 17, 2026)	Longest-running noontime variety show.
47 years	N/A	Eat Bulaga!	TV5	January 6, 2024	present	14,647 (as of October 17, 2026)	Longest-running noontime variety show.
46 years	N/A	Big News	ABC	March 19, 1962	September 22, 1972	N/A	Note: The newscast did not air from 1972 to 1992.
46 years	N/A	Big News	ABC	February 24, 1992	August 8, 2008	N/A	Note: The newscast did not air from 1972 to 1992.
42 years	N/A	NewsWatch	KBS/RPN/New Vision 9	June 1, 1970	October 29, 2012	11,024	Longest-running English-language newscast until 2012. Note: The NewsWatch brand has been revived as a digital platform NewsWatch Plus, managed by Broadreach Media Holdings, following the cessation of the former CNN Philippines. In addition, this show produced multiple editions, which includes: NewsWatch Balita Ngayon; NewsWatch Evening Edition; NewsWatch Evening Cast (1970–1999); NewsWatch First Edition (2008–2009); NewsWatch Final Edition; NewsWatch International (1977–1990); NewsWatch Kids Edition (1979–1993); NewsWatch Now (2001–2007, 2024–present; Aliw 23); NewsWatch Pilipino Edition (1981–1985); NewsWatch Prime Cast (1970–2000); NewsWatch Primetime Edition (1999–2000); NewsWatch sa Tanghali (1994–2000); NewsWatch sa Umaga; NewsWatch Second Edition (2008–2009); NewsWatch Update (2008–2011)
43 years	N/A	Ang Dating Daan	IBC/Islands TV 13	1983	1997	N/A	Longest-running religious program in the Philippines and in the world.
43 years	N/A	Ang Dating Daan	New Vision 9/RPN	1992	1998	N/A	Longest-running religious program in the Philippines and in the world.
43 years	N/A	Ang Dating Daan	RJTV	1997	1999	N/A	Longest-running religious program in the Philippines and in the world.
43 years	N/A	Ang Dating Daan	PTV	1999	2000	N/A	Longest-running religious program in the Philippines and in the world.
43 years	N/A	Ang Dating Daan	SBN	2000	July 11, 2004	N/A	Longest-running religious program in the Philippines and in the world.
43 years	N/A	Ang Dating Daan	UNTV	July 12, 2004	present	N/A	Longest-running religious program in the Philippines and in the world.
43 years	N/A	Ang Iglesia ni Cristo	MBS/PTV; RPN	February 13, 1983	1990	N/A	2nd longest-running religious program in the Philippines.
43 years	N/A	Ang Iglesia ni Cristo	BBC/City2	1983	September 6, 1986	N/A	2nd longest-running religious program in the Philippines.
43 years	N/A	Ang Iglesia ni Cristo	ABS-CBN	1990	2003	N/A	2nd longest-running religious program in the Philippines.
43 years	N/A	Ang Iglesia ni Cristo	IBC	1999	2002	N/A	2nd longest-running religious program in the Philippines.
43 years	N/A	Ang Iglesia ni Cristo	Net 25	2000	present	N/A	2nd longest-running religious program in the Philippines.
43 years	N/A	Ang Iglesia ni Cristo	GEM TV	July 21, 2005	October 30, 2012	N/A	2nd longest-running religious program in the Philippines.
43 years	N/A	Ang Iglesia ni Cristo	INC TV	October 31, 2012	present	N/A	2nd longest-running religious program in the Philippines.

== 30–39 years ==
Length	Number of seasons	Series	Network	First broadcast	Last broadcast	Number of episodes	Notes
39 years	N/A	TV Patrol	ABS-CBN	March 2, 1987	May 5, 2020	N/A	Also known as TV Patrol World (November 22, 2004 – June 29, 2010). Longest-running Filipino-language newscast. Note: Program was suspended due to the ABS-CBN franchise renewal controversy on May 5, 2020, but resumed after two days on May 7, 2020.
39 years	N/A	TV Patrol	DZMM TeleRadyo	March 12, 2007	May 5, 2020	N/A	Also known as TV Patrol World (November 22, 2004 – June 29, 2010). Longest-running Filipino-language newscast. Note: Program was suspended due to the ABS-CBN franchise renewal controversy on May 5, 2020, but resumed after two days on May 7, 2020.
39 years	N/A	TV Patrol	DZMM TeleRadyo	May 30, 2025	present	N/A	Also known as TV Patrol World (November 22, 2004 – June 29, 2010). Longest-running Filipino-language newscast. Note: Program was suspended due to the ABS-CBN franchise renewal controversy on May 5, 2020, but resumed after two days on May 7, 2020.
39 years	N/A	TV Patrol	ANC	March 17, 2020	present	N/A	Also known as TV Patrol World (November 22, 2004 – June 29, 2010). Longest-running Filipino-language newscast. Note: Program was suspended due to the ABS-CBN franchise renewal controversy on May 5, 2020, but resumed after two days on May 7, 2020.
39 years	N/A	TV Patrol	TeleRadyo	May 8, 2020	June 29, 2023	N/A	Also known as TV Patrol World (November 22, 2004 – June 29, 2010). Longest-running Filipino-language newscast. Note: Program was suspended due to the ABS-CBN franchise renewal controversy on May 5, 2020, but resumed after two days on May 7, 2020.
39 years	N/A	TV Patrol	Cine Mo!	May 8, 2020	July 24, 2020	N/A	Also known as TV Patrol World (November 22, 2004 – June 29, 2010). Longest-running Filipino-language newscast. Note: Program was suspended due to the ABS-CBN franchise renewal controversy on May 5, 2020, but resumed after two days on May 7, 2020.
39 years	N/A	TV Patrol	Kapamilya Channel	July 27, 2020	present	N/A	Also known as TV Patrol World (November 22, 2004 – June 29, 2010). Longest-running Filipino-language newscast. Note: Program was suspended due to the ABS-CBN franchise renewal controversy on May 5, 2020, but resumed after two days on May 7, 2020.
39 years	N/A	TV Patrol	A2Z	January 3, 2022	present	N/A	Also known as TV Patrol World (November 22, 2004 – June 29, 2010). Longest-running Filipino-language newscast. Note: Program was suspended due to the ABS-CBN franchise renewal controversy on May 5, 2020, but resumed after two days on May 7, 2020.
39 years	N/A	TV Patrol	TeleRadyo Serbisyo	June 30, 2023	May 29, 2025	N/A	Also known as TV Patrol World (November 22, 2004 – June 29, 2010). Longest-running Filipino-language newscast. Note: Program was suspended due to the ABS-CBN franchise renewal controversy on May 5, 2020, but resumed after two days on May 7, 2020.
39 years	N/A	TV Patrol	All TV	April 15, 2024	present	N/A	Also known as TV Patrol World (November 22, 2004 – June 29, 2010). Longest-running Filipino-language newscast. Note: Program was suspended due to the ABS-CBN franchise renewal controversy on May 5, 2020, but resumed after two days on May 7, 2020.
39 years	N/A	TV Patrol	PRTV Prime Media	May 27, 2024	present	N/A	Also known as TV Patrol World (November 22, 2004 – June 29, 2010). Longest-running Filipino-language newscast. Note: Program was suspended due to the ABS-CBN franchise renewal controversy on May 5, 2020, but resumed after two days on May 7, 2020.
38 years	N/A	Family Kuarta o Kahon	ABS-CBN	July 1, 1962	September 17, 1972	N/A	Longest-running game show.
38 years	N/A	Family Kuarta o Kahon	BBC/City2	November 11, 1973	1984	N/A	Longest-running game show.
38 years	N/A	Family Kuarta o Kahon	RPN/New Vision 9	1984	December 17, 2000	N/A	Longest-running game show.
37 years	N/A	Jesus the Healer	GMA	June 1, 1989	1999	N/A	
37 years	N/A	Jesus the Healer	GMA	2006	June 2, 2019	N/A	
37 years	N/A	Jesus the Healer	ZOE TV/Light TV	1998	present	N/A	
37 years	N/A	Jesus the Healer	RPN	2000	2005	N/A	
37 years	N/A	Jesus the Healer	QTV/Q	November 13, 2005	February 20, 2011	N/A	
37 years	N/A	Jesus the Healer	GMA News TV	March 6, 2011	June 2, 2019	N/A	
37 years	N/A	Jesus the Healer	PTV	2014	2014	N/A	
37 years	N/A	Jesus the Healer	A2Z	October 10, 2020	present	N/A	
36 years	N/A	Tawag ng Tanghalan	ABS-CBN	1953	1972	N/A	Original talent search show of ABS-CBN did not air from 1972 to 1986. Now a segment of It's Showtime.
36 years	N/A	Tawag ng Tanghalan	ABS-CBN	March 6, 1987	November 26, 1989	N/A	Original talent search show of ABS-CBN did not air from 1972 to 1986. Now a segment of It's Showtime.
39 years	N/A	Motoring Today	PTV/NBN	June 7, 1987	2006	N/A	Longest-running motorsports and automotive television program in the Philippines.
39 years	N/A	Motoring Today	PTV/NBN	2008	2009	N/A	Longest-running motorsports and automotive television program in the Philippines.
39 years	N/A	Motoring Today	Solar Sports	2009	present	N/A	Longest-running motorsports and automotive television program in the Philippines.
35 years	N/A	Ating Alamin	MBS/PTV/NBN	October 5, 1980	1991	N/A	While its television debut was on October 5, 1980, Ating Alamin's first incarnation was as an agricultural education show, which premiered in 1974.
35 years	N/A	Ating Alamin	MBS/PTV/NBN	2009	July 10, 2016	N/A	While its television debut was on October 5, 1980, Ating Alamin's first incarnation was as an agricultural education show, which premiered in 1974.
35 years	N/A	Ating Alamin	IBC	1994	2005	N/A	While its television debut was on October 5, 1980, Ating Alamin's first incarnation was as an agricultural education show, which premiered in 1974.
35 years	N/A	Ating Alamin	IBC	2007	2009	N/A	While its television debut was on October 5, 1980, Ating Alamin's first incarnation was as an agricultural education show, which premiered in 1974.
35 years	N/A	Ating Alamin	ABC	2005	2007	N/A	While its television debut was on October 5, 1980, Ating Alamin's first incarnation was as an agricultural education show, which premiered in 1974.
35 years	N/A	Ating Alamin	UNTV	2010	2013	N/A	While its television debut was on October 5, 1980, Ating Alamin's first incarnation was as an agricultural education show, which premiered in 1974.
35 years	31	Maalaala Mo Kaya	ABS-CBN	May 15, 1991	May 2, 2020	1,362	Longest-running drama anthology in the Philippines. Note: The program did not air from 2022 to 2025. Note: Program was suspended due to the ABS-CBN franchise renewal controversy on May 2, 2020.
35 years	31	Maalaala Mo Kaya	Kapamilya Channel	June 13, 2020	December 10, 2022	1,362	Longest-running drama anthology in the Philippines. Note: The program did not air from 2022 to 2025. Note: Program was suspended due to the ABS-CBN franchise renewal controversy on May 2, 2020.
35 years	31	Maalaala Mo Kaya	Kapamilya Channel	April 26, 2025	July 26, 2025	1,362	Longest-running drama anthology in the Philippines. Note: The program did not air from 2022 to 2025. Note: Program was suspended due to the ABS-CBN franchise renewal controversy on May 2, 2020.
35 years	31	Maalaala Mo Kaya	A2Z	October 10, 2020	December 10, 2022	1,362	Longest-running drama anthology in the Philippines. Note: The program did not air from 2022 to 2025. Note: Program was suspended due to the ABS-CBN franchise renewal controversy on May 2, 2020.
35 years	31	Maalaala Mo Kaya	A2Z	April 26, 2025	July 26, 2025	1,362	Longest-running drama anthology in the Philippines. Note: The program did not air from 2022 to 2025. Note: Program was suspended due to the ABS-CBN franchise renewal controversy on May 2, 2020.
35 years	31	Maalaala Mo Kaya	All TV	April 26, 2025	July 26, 2025	1,362	Longest-running drama anthology in the Philippines. Note: The program did not air from 2022 to 2025. Note: Program was suspended due to the ABS-CBN franchise renewal controversy on May 2, 2020.
35 years	31	Maalaala Mo Kaya	iWant	April 24, 2025	July 26, 2025	1,362	Longest-running drama anthology in the Philippines. Note: The program did not air from 2022 to 2025. Note: Program was suspended due to the ABS-CBN franchise renewal controversy on May 2, 2020.
31 years	N/A	Ipaglaban Mo!	IBC/Islands TV 13	June 13, 1988	August 14, 1992	N/A	Note: The show did not air from 1999 to 2012 and again from 2013 to 2014; the program was suspended due to the ABS-CBN franchise renewal controversy on May 2, 2020.
31 years	N/A	Ipaglaban Mo!	ABS-CBN	August 16, 1992	March 7, 1999	N/A	Note: The show did not air from 1999 to 2012 and again from 2013 to 2014; the program was suspended due to the ABS-CBN franchise renewal controversy on May 2, 2020.
31 years	N/A	Ipaglaban Mo!	RPN	February 7, 2004	2005	N/A	Note: The show did not air from 1999 to 2012 and again from 2013 to 2014; the program was suspended due to the ABS-CBN franchise renewal controversy on May 2, 2020.
31 years	N/A	Ipaglaban Mo!	GMA News TV	November 10, 2012	June 16, 2013	N/A	Note: The show did not air from 1999 to 2012 and again from 2013 to 2014; the program was suspended due to the ABS-CBN franchise renewal controversy on May 2, 2020.
31 years	N/A	Ipaglaban Mo!	ABS-CBN	June 7, 2014	May 2, 2020	N/A	Note: The show did not air from 1999 to 2012 and again from 2013 to 2014; the program was suspended due to the ABS-CBN franchise renewal controversy on May 2, 2020.
31 years	N/A	Ipaglaban Mo!	Kapamilya Channel	June 14, 2020	July 5, 2020	N/A	Note: The show did not air from 1999 to 2012 and again from 2013 to 2014; the program was suspended due to the ABS-CBN franchise renewal controversy on May 2, 2020.
32 years	N/A	Student Canteen	ABS-CBN	July 21, 1958	January 8, 1965	N/A	2nd longest-running noontime variety program. Note: The show did not air from 1965 to 1975 and again from 1986 to 1989.
32 years	N/A	Student Canteen	GMA	January 1975	June 7, 1986	N/A	2nd longest-running noontime variety program. Note: The show did not air from 1965 to 1975 and again from 1986 to 1989.
32 years	N/A	Student Canteen	RPN/New Vision 9	February 20, 1989	June 9, 1990	N/A	2nd longest-running noontime variety program. Note: The show did not air from 1965 to 1975 and again from 1986 to 1989.
31 years	N/A	PTV Newsbreak	PTV	March 13, 1989	August 2, 1998	N/A	Longest-running hourly news program. Note: The program did not air from 1998 to 2012.
31 years	N/A	PTV Newsbreak	PTV	July 2, 2012	March 16, 2020	N/A	Longest-running hourly news program. Note: The program did not air from 1998 to 2012.
31 years	N/A	Family Rosary Crusade	ABS-CBN	March 7, 1987	August 30, 2003	N/A	One of the longest-running Catholic Filipino TV shows.
31 years	N/A	Family Rosary Crusade	RPN/New Vision 9	October 8, 1987	December 30, 2007	N/A	One of the longest-running Catholic Filipino TV shows.
31 years	N/A	Family Rosary Crusade	PTV/NBN	March 7, 1987	December 31, 2014	N/A	One of the longest-running Catholic Filipino TV shows.
31 years	N/A	Family Rosary Crusade	ABC	February 26, 1992	August 3, 2008	N/A	One of the longest-running Catholic Filipino TV shows.
31 years	N/A	Family Rosary Crusade	Studio 23	October 20, 1996	January 12, 2014	N/A	One of the longest-running Catholic Filipino TV shows.
31 years	N/A	Family Rosary Crusade	S+A	January 19, 2014	November 17, 2018	N/A	One of the longest-running Catholic Filipino TV shows.
31 years	N/A	TV Patrol Central Visayas	ABS-CBN Cebu	August 29, 1988	June 29, 2001	N/A	Longest-running TV Patrol regional television franchise; previously known as TV Patrol Cebu.
31 years	N/A	TV Patrol Central Visayas	ABS-CBN Cebu	July 2, 2001	August 28, 2020	N/A	Longest-running TV Patrol regional television franchise; previously known as TV Patrol Cebu.
31 years	N/A	TV Patrol Negros	ABS-CBN Bacolod	December 12, 1988	May 29, 1992	N/A	2nd longest-running TV Patrol regional television franchise; previously known as TV Patrol 4, TV Patrol Western Visayas and TV Patrol Bacolod.
31 years	N/A	TV Patrol Negros	ABS-CBN Bacolod	June 1, 1992	June 12, 1998	N/A	2nd longest-running TV Patrol regional television franchise; previously known as TV Patrol 4, TV Patrol Western Visayas and TV Patrol Bacolod.
31 years	N/A	TV Patrol Negros	ABS-CBN Bacolod	June 15, 1998	April 4, 2007	N/A	2nd longest-running TV Patrol regional television franchise; previously known as TV Patrol 4, TV Patrol Western Visayas and TV Patrol Bacolod.
31 years	N/A	TV Patrol Negros	ABS-CBN Bacolod	April 9, 2007	August 28, 2020	N/A	2nd longest-running TV Patrol regional television franchise; previously known as TV Patrol 4, TV Patrol Western Visayas and TV Patrol Bacolod.
31 years	N/A	TV Patrol Southern Mindanao	ABS-CBN Davao	April 17, 1989	August 28, 2020	N/A	3rd longest-running TV Patrol regional television franchise.
30 years	N/A	Uncle Bob's Lucky 7 Club	RBS/GMA	November 4, 1961	July 11, 1992	1,570	Longest-running children's show.
33 years	N/A	Mag-Agri Tayo	PTV/NBN	1993	present	N/A	Longest-running agricultural program.
30 years	11	Batibot	RPN/New Vision 9	1983	1991	N/A	The show was also known as Batang Batibot. Note: The program did not air from 2001 to 2010.
30 years	11	Batibot	RPN/New Vision 9	1994	October 6, 1995	N/A	The show was also known as Batang Batibot. Note: The program did not air from 2001 to 2010.
30 years	11	Batibot	MBS/PTV	1984	1991	N/A	The show was also known as Batang Batibot. Note: The program did not air from 2001 to 2010.
30 years	11	Batibot	ABS-CBN	1991	1994	N/A	The show was also known as Batang Batibot. Note: The program did not air from 2001 to 2010.
30 years	11	Batibot	GMA	October 9, 1995	1998	N/A	The show was also known as Batang Batibot. Note: The program did not air from 2001 to 2010.
30 years	11	Batibot	GMA	1998	2001	N/A	The show was also known as Batang Batibot. Note: The program did not air from 2001 to 2010.
30 years	11	Batibot	TV5	November 27, 2010	2013	N/A	The show was also known as Batang Batibot. Note: The program did not air from 2001 to 2010.
31 years	N/A	ASAP	ABS-CBN	February 5, 1995	May 3, 2020	9,830 (as of October 18, 2026)	Longest-running musical variety show. Note: Program was suspended due to the ABS-CBN franchise renewal controversy on May 3, 2020, but resumed after five weeks following the launch of Kapamilya Channel on June 13.
31 years	N/A	ASAP	Jeepney TV	June 17, 2018	September 2, 2018	9,830 (as of October 18, 2026)	Longest-running musical variety show. Note: Program was suspended due to the ABS-CBN franchise renewal controversy on May 3, 2020, but resumed after five weeks following the launch of Kapamilya Channel on June 13.
31 years	N/A	ASAP	Jeepney TV	January 6, 2019	present	9,830 (as of October 18, 2026)	Longest-running musical variety show. Note: Program was suspended due to the ABS-CBN franchise renewal controversy on May 3, 2020, but resumed after five weeks following the launch of Kapamilya Channel on June 13.
31 years	N/A	ASAP	Kapamilya Channel	June 14, 2020	present	9,830 (as of October 18, 2026)	Longest-running musical variety show. Note: Program was suspended due to the ABS-CBN franchise renewal controversy on May 3, 2020, but resumed after five weeks following the launch of Kapamilya Channel on June 13.
31 years	N/A	ASAP	Metro Channel	June 28, 2020	present	9,830 (as of October 18, 2026)	Longest-running musical variety show. Note: Program was suspended due to the ABS-CBN franchise renewal controversy on May 3, 2020, but resumed after five weeks following the launch of Kapamilya Channel on June 13.
31 years	N/A	ASAP	A2Z	October 11, 2020	present	9,830 (as of October 18, 2026)	Longest-running musical variety show. Note: Program was suspended due to the ABS-CBN franchise renewal controversy on May 3, 2020, but resumed after five weeks following the launch of Kapamilya Channel on June 13.
31 years	N/A	ASAP	TV5	January 24, 2021	present	9,830 (as of October 18, 2026)	Longest-running musical variety show. Note: Program was suspended due to the ABS-CBN franchise renewal controversy on May 3, 2020, but resumed after five weeks following the launch of Kapamilya Channel on June 13.
31 years	N/A	ASAP	All TV	January 4, 2026	present	9,830 (as of October 18, 2026)	Longest-running musical variety show. Note: Program was suspended due to the ABS-CBN franchise renewal controversy on May 3, 2020, but resumed after five weeks following the launch of Kapamilya Channel on June 13.
31 years	N/A	PCSO Lottery Draw	PTV/NBN	March 8, 1995	2003	N/A	2nd longest-running game show. Produced by the Philippine Charity Sweepstakes Office (PCSO). Note: The program did not air from 2003 until 2005, July 2019 (due to the suspension of its gaming operations after verbal order by President Rodrigo Duterte) and from March until August 2020 due to the suspension of its gaming operations due to the enhanced community quarantine in Luzon and the COVID-19 pandemic. The program moved to IBC/D8TV as the new content partners of PCSO Lottery Draw on December 31, 2024.
31 years	N/A	PCSO Lottery Draw	PTV/NBN	2005	December 30, 2024	N/A	
31 years	N/A	PCSO Lottery Draw	IBC	December 31, 2024	present	N/A	
31 years	N/A	PCSO Lottery Draw	D8TV	December 31, 2024	present	N/A	
31 years	21	Bubble Gang	GMA	October 20, 1995	present	1,559 (as of October 18, 2026)	Longest-running sketch program on Philippine television.
31 years	21	Bubble Gang	Pinoy Hits	January 20, 2023	September 15, 2024	1,559 (as of October 18, 2026)	Longest-running sketch program on Philippine television.
31 years	21	Bubble Gang	GTV	July 9, 2023	February 2, 2025	1,559 (as of October 18, 2026)	Longest-running sketch program on Philippine television.
31 years	N/A	Saksi	GMA	October 2, 1995	present	8,051	Originally as an early evening newscast from 1995 to 2002, the program is the 2nd longest-running Filipino language late night newscast.
31 years	N/A	Saksi	GMA News TV	September 14, 2020	September 18, 2020	8,051	Originally as an early evening newscast from 1995 to 2002, the program is the 2nd longest-running Filipino language late night newscast.
31 years	N/A	Saksi	GTV	August 9, 2021	March 16, 2023	8,051	Originally as an early evening newscast from 1995 to 2002, the program is the 2nd longest-running Filipino language late night newscast.
30 years	N/A	Dateline Philippines	SNN	July 10, 1996	October 10, 1999	N/A	2nd Longest-running noontime newscast.Note: The program temporarily aired on DZMM TeleRadyo in 2020, prior to the COVID-19 pandemic in the Philippines.
30 years	N/A	Dateline Philippines	ANC	October 11, 1999	present	N/A	2nd Longest-running noontime newscast.Note: The program temporarily aired on DZMM TeleRadyo in 2020, prior to the COVID-19 pandemic in the Philippines.

== 20–29 years ==
Length	Number of seasons	Series	Network	First broadcast	Last broadcast	Number of episodes	Notes
28 years	N/A	Powerline	SMNI	August 5, 1995	December 19, 2023	N/A	The flagship religious program of the Kingdom of Jesus Christ, hosted by Apollo Quiboloy. Note: Although, the program stopped its airing on free TV, it continues to air on cable or satellite. In addition, the network (SMNI) has been a subject to various criticisms, which includes centering on right-wing populist bias, handling its own coverage through forms of disinformation, stopping its radio and television operations in 2023 and various criticisms of the KOJC church, which includes the 2024 Senate hearing, and the arrest of Apollo Quiboloy in the KOJC Compound in Davao City.
29 years	N/A	Travel Time	IBC	October 3, 1986	1989	N/A	Longest-running travel documentary program in the Philippines.
29 years	N/A	Travel Time	GMA	1989	1998	N/A	Longest-running travel documentary program in the Philippines.
29 years	N/A	Travel Time	Studio 23	1998	2007	N/A	Longest-running travel documentary program in the Philippines.
29 years	N/A	Travel Time	ANC	2007	2015	N/A	Longest-running travel documentary program in the Philippines.
29 years	N/A	Aawitan Kita	RPN/New Vision 9	1977	1997	N/A	
29 years	N/A	Aawitan Kita	GMA	1997	2001	N/A	
29 years	N/A	Aawitan Kita	ABC	2002	2006	N/A	
28 years	N/A	TV Patrol Panay	ABS-CBN Iloilo	June 1, 1992	June 12, 1998	N/A	Previously known as TV Patrol Western Visayas and TV Patrol Iloilo.
28 years	N/A	TV Patrol Panay	ABS-CBN Iloilo	June 15, 1998	August 19, 2011	N/A	Previously known as TV Patrol Western Visayas and TV Patrol Iloilo.
28 years	N/A	TV Patrol Panay	ABS-CBN Iloilo	August 22, 2011	August 28, 2020	N/A	Previously known as TV Patrol Western Visayas and TV Patrol Iloilo.
28 years	N/A	Sharing in the City	RPN/New Vision 9	1979	December 29, 2007	N/A	
28 years	N/A	El Shaddai	Islands TV 13/IBC	January 8, 1992	June 14, 2020	N/A	2nd longest-running Catholic program.
28 years	N/A	Wow Mali	ABC	May 25, 1996	August 2, 2008	N/A	Longest-running reality based gag show, also known as Wow Maling Mali, Wow Meganon, Wow Mali Pa Rin, Wow Mali: Lakas ng Tama! and Wow Mali: Doble Tama!
28 years	N/A	Wow Mali	TV5	February 22, 2009	June 28, 2015	N/A	Longest-running reality based gag show, also known as Wow Maling Mali, Wow Meganon, Wow Mali Pa Rin, Wow Mali: Lakas ng Tama! and Wow Mali: Doble Tama!
28 years	N/A	Wow Mali	TV5	August 26, 2023	October 26, 2024	N/A	Longest-running reality based gag show, also known as Wow Maling Mali, Wow Meganon, Wow Mali Pa Rin, Wow Mali: Lakas ng Tama! and Wow Mali: Doble Tama!
27 years	N/A	IBC Headliners	IBC	April 4, 1994	August 5, 2011	N/A	Longest-running hourly news program. Note: The program did not air from 2011 to 2021.
27 years	N/A	IBC Headliners	IBC	October 25, 2021	November 19, 2021	N/A	Longest-running hourly news program. Note: The program did not air from 2011 to 2021.
27 years	N/A	Oras ng Katotohanan	Islands TV 13/IBC	October 18, 1991	1995	N/A	
27 years	N/A	Oras ng Katotohanan	Islands TV 13/IBC	March 12, 2001	February 18, 2018	N/A	
27 years	N/A	Oras ng Katotohanan	SBN	2004	December 30, 2007	N/A	
27 years	N/A	Oras ng Katotohanan	PTV	August 12, 2013	June 29, 2018	N/A	
27 years	N/A	Oras ng Katotohanan	TV5	August 2025	present	N/A	
26 years	N/A	Legal Forum	New Vision 9/RPN	1992	2006	N/A	
26 years	N/A	Legal Forum	ZOE TV/Light TV	2004	March 15, 2018	N/A	
28 years	N/A	Sing Galing!	ABC	March 6, 1998	April 30, 2005	N/A	The show did not air from 2005 to 2021 again from 2022 to 2025.
28 years	N/A	Sing Galing!	TV5	April 5, 2021	December 22, 2022	N/A	The show did not air from 2005 to 2021 again from 2022 to 2025.
28 years	N/A	Sing Galing!	TV5	March 1, 2025	present	N/A	The show did not air from 2005 to 2021 again from 2022 to 2025.
26 years	N/A	Maayong Buntag Mindanao	ABS-CBN Davao	September 6, 1993	August 28, 2020	N/A	Longest-running regional morning show.
28 years	N/A	IBC Express Balita	IBC	July 13, 1998	August 5, 2011	N/A	IBC's longest-running primetime newscast note: the newscast did not air from 2011 to 2022.
28 years	N/A	IBC Express Balita	IBC	October 31, 2022	present	N/A	IBC's longest-running primetime newscast note: the newscast did not air from 2011 to 2022.
28 years	N/A	Ito Ang Balita	RJTV	January 5, 1998	January 12, 2001	N/A	UNTV's longest-running Filipino-language evening newscast, and currently flagship primetime newscast of UNTV.
28 years	N/A	Ito Ang Balita	SBN	January 15, 2001	July 9, 2004	N/A	UNTV's longest-running Filipino-language evening newscast, and currently flagship primetime newscast of UNTV.
28 years	N/A	Ito Ang Balita	UNTV	July 12, 2004	2005	N/A	UNTV's longest-running Filipino-language evening newscast, and currently flagship primetime newscast of UNTV.
28 years	N/A	Ito Ang Balita	UNTV	September 3, 2007	present	N/A	UNTV's longest-running Filipino-language evening newscast, and currently flagship primetime newscast of UNTV.
25 years	N/A	TV Patrol Chavacano	ABS-CBN Zamboanga	January 16, 1995	August 28, 2020	N/A	Previously known as TV Patrol Zamboanga.
25 years	N/A	TV Patrol North Mindanao	ABS-CBN Cagayan de Oro and ABS-CBN Pagadian	May 1, 1995	2006	N/A	Previously known as TV Patrol Cagayan de Oro, TV Patrol Iligan and TV Patrol Northern Mindanao.
25 years	N/A	TV Patrol North Mindanao	ABS-CBN Cagayan de Oro and ABS-CBN Pagadian	2006	June 29, 2018	N/A	Previously known as TV Patrol Cagayan de Oro, TV Patrol Iligan and TV Patrol Northern Mindanao.
25 years	N/A	TV Patrol North Mindanao	ABS-CBN Cagayan de Oro and ABS-CBN Pagadian	July 2, 2018	August 28, 2020	N/A	Previously known as TV Patrol Cagayan de Oro, TV Patrol Iligan and TV Patrol Northern Mindanao.
22 years	N/A	PJM Forum	ZOE TV/Light TV	1998	2020	N/A	
22 years	N/A	PJM Forum	QTV/Q	November 16, 2005	February 16, 2011	N/A	
22 years	N/A	PJM Forum	GMA	2006	2017	N/A	
22 years	N/A	PJM Forum	GMA News TV	March 1, 2011	October 19, 2018	N/A	
20 years	4	S.O.C.O.: Scene of the Crime Operatives	ABS-CBN	November 23, 2005	May 2, 2020	763	Longest-running investigation documentary drama. Note: Program was suspended due to the ABS-CBN franchise renewal controversy on May 2, 2020. It resumed broadcast on Kapamilya Channel, A2Z and All TV on January 17, 2026. The program did not air from 2020 to 2026.
20 years	4	S.O.C.O.: Scene of the Crime Operatives	Kapamilya Channel	June 13, 2020	October 17, 2020	763	Longest-running investigation documentary drama. Note: Program was suspended due to the ABS-CBN franchise renewal controversy on May 2, 2020. It resumed broadcast on Kapamilya Channel, A2Z and All TV on January 17, 2026. The program did not air from 2020 to 2026.
20 years	4	S.O.C.O.: Scene of the Crime Operatives	Kapamilya Channel	January 17, 2026	present	763	Longest-running investigation documentary drama. Note: Program was suspended due to the ABS-CBN franchise renewal controversy on May 2, 2020. It resumed broadcast on Kapamilya Channel, A2Z and All TV on January 17, 2026. The program did not air from 2020 to 2026.
20 years	4	S.O.C.O.: Scene of the Crime Operatives	A2Z	January 17, 2026	present	763	Longest-running investigation documentary drama. Note: Program was suspended due to the ABS-CBN franchise renewal controversy on May 2, 2020. It resumed broadcast on Kapamilya Channel, A2Z and All TV on January 17, 2026. The program did not air from 2020 to 2026.
20 years	4	S.O.C.O.: Scene of the Crime Operatives	All TV	January 17, 2026	present	763	Longest-running investigation documentary drama. Note: Program was suspended due to the ABS-CBN franchise renewal controversy on May 2, 2020. It resumed broadcast on Kapamilya Channel, A2Z and All TV on January 17, 2026. The program did not air from 2020 to 2026.
24 years	N/A	TV Patrol North Luzon	ABS-CBN Baguio	November 27, 1995	June 29, 2018	N/A	Previously known as TV Patrol Baguio and TV Patrol Northern Luzon.
24 years	N/A	TV Patrol North Luzon	ABS-CBN Baguio	July 2, 2018	August 28, 2020	N/A	Previously known as TV Patrol Baguio and TV Patrol Northern Luzon.
24 years	N/A	TV Patrol South Central Mindanao	ABS-CBN General Santos	February 12, 1996	June 29, 2018	N/A	Previously known as TV Patrol Socsksargen.
24 years	N/A	TV Patrol South Central Mindanao	ABS-CBN General Santos	July 2, 2018	August 28, 2020	N/A	Previously known as TV Patrol Socsksargen.
24 years	N/A	TV Patrol Bicol	ABS-CBN Naga	July 1, 1996	August 28, 2020	N/A	
28 years	N/A	Diyos at Bayan	ZOE TV/Light TV	August 21, 1998	present	N/A	
28 years	N/A	Diyos at Bayan	RPN	August 21, 1998	2001	N/A	
28 years	N/A	Diyos at Bayan	RPN	2002	August 2005	N/A	
28 years	N/A	Diyos at Bayan	GMA	2006	June 2, 2019	N/A	
28 years	N/A	Diyos at Bayan	NBN	2001	2002	N/A	
28 years	N/A	Diyos at Bayan	QTV/Q	November 15, 2005	February 19, 2011	N/A	
28 years	N/A	Diyos at Bayan	GMA News TV	March 5, 2011	June 2, 2019	N/A	
28 years	N/A	Diyos at Bayan	A2Z	December 12, 2021	present	N/A	
28 years	N/A	Kasangga Mo ang Langit	RPN	July 10, 1998	March 10, 2007	N/A	Produced by Heavenly Images Productions for Television, Inc.
28 years	N/A	Kasangga Mo ang Langit	IBC	January 5, 2008	September 13, 2013	N/A	Produced by Heavenly Images Productions for Television, Inc.
28 years	N/A	Kasangga Mo ang Langit	PTV	September 22, 2013	August 31, 2019	N/A	Produced by Heavenly Images Productions for Television, Inc.
28 years	N/A	Kasangga Mo ang Langit	RJDigiTV	September 7, 2019	October 22, 2022	N/A	Produced by Heavenly Images Productions for Television, Inc.
28 years	N/A	Kasangga Mo ang Langit	Bilyonaryo News Channel	March 8, 2025	present	N/A	Produced by Heavenly Images Productions for Television, Inc.
28 years	N/A	Kasangga Mo ang Langit	Abante TeleTabloid/Abante RadyoTV	2025	present	N/A	Produced by Heavenly Images Productions for Television, Inc.
28 years	N/A	Tukaan	IBC	October 31, 1998	September 2, 2017	N/A	2nd longest-running sports program.
28 years	N/A	Tukaan	TV5	October 1, 2017	July 26, 2020	N/A	2nd longest-running sports program.
28 years	N/A	Tukaan	One Sports	August 2, 2020	present	N/A	2nd longest-running sports program.
27 years	N/A	i-Witness	GMA	January 18, 1999	present	932	
27 years	N/A	i-Witness	GMA News TV	July 24, 2020	January 1, 2021	932	
27 years	N/A	i-Witness	DepEd TV (GMA digital channel)	July 29, 2021	June 30, 2022	932	
27 years	N/A	i-Witness	Pinoy Hits	January 20, 2023	September 13, 2024	932	
23 years	N/A	Probe	ABS-CBN	March 6, 1987	December 18, 1987	1,141	The 3rd longest documentary in the Philippines. Note: One News of MediaQuest Holdings currently airs Probe Archives, featuring the archives of the Probe show.
23 years	N/A	Probe	ABS-CBN	August 17, 2005	June 30, 2010	1,141	The 3rd longest documentary in the Philippines. Note: One News of MediaQuest Holdings currently airs Probe Archives, featuring the archives of the Probe show.
23 years	N/A	Probe	GMA	May 20, 1988	November 25, 2003	1,141	The 3rd longest documentary in the Philippines. Note: One News of MediaQuest Holdings currently airs Probe Archives, featuring the archives of the Probe show.
23 years	N/A	Probe	ABC	May 15, 2004	April 16, 2005	1,141	The 3rd longest documentary in the Philippines. Note: One News of MediaQuest Holdings currently airs Probe Archives, featuring the archives of the Probe show.
23 years	N/A	TV Patrol Eastern Visayas	ABS-CBN Tacloban	April 7, 1997	November 8, 2013	N/A	Previously known as TV Patrol Tacloban. Note: The newscast was suspended during Typhoon Haiyan on November 8, 2013, but resumed after six weeks following the disaster.
23 years	N/A	TV Patrol Eastern Visayas	ABS-CBN Tacloban	December 23, 2013	September 7, 2018	N/A	Previously known as TV Patrol Tacloban. Note: The newscast was suspended during Typhoon Haiyan on November 8, 2013, but resumed after six weeks following the disaster.
23 years	N/A	TV Patrol Eastern Visayas	ABS-CBN Tacloban	September 10, 2018	August 28, 2020	N/A	Previously known as TV Patrol Tacloban. Note: The newscast was suspended during Typhoon Haiyan on November 8, 2013, but resumed after six weeks following the disaster.
22 years	N/A	Sports Unlimited	ABS-CBN	June 14, 1997	February 7, 2015	1,173	Longest-running sports program. Aired as Sports U from 2015 to 2020.
22 years	N/A	Sports Unlimited	ABS-CBN	February 12, 2015	April 29, 2020	1,173	Longest-running sports program. Aired as Sports U from 2015 to 2020.
27 years	N/A	One Mindanao	GMA Davao	October 4, 1999	November 7, 2014	N/A	Previously known as Testigo, 24 Oras Southern Mindanao and 24 Oras Davao.
27 years	N/A	One Mindanao	GMA Davao	November 10, 2014	September 30, 2016	N/A	Previously known as Testigo, 24 Oras Southern Mindanao and 24 Oras Davao.
27 years	N/A	One Mindanao	GMA Davao	October 3, 2016	August 25, 2017	N/A	Previously known as Testigo, 24 Oras Southern Mindanao and 24 Oras Davao.
27 years	N/A	One Mindanao	GMA Davao	August 28, 2017	present	N/A	Previously known as Testigo, 24 Oras Southern Mindanao and 24 Oras Davao.
27 years	N/A	One Mindanao	GMA News TV (GMA Regional TV Strip)	May 21, 2020	February 18, 2021	N/A	Previously known as Testigo, 24 Oras Southern Mindanao and 24 Oras Davao.
27 years	N/A	One Mindanao	GTV (Regional TV Strip)	February 25, 2021	July 21, 2021	N/A	Previously known as Testigo, 24 Oras Southern Mindanao and 24 Oras Davao.
27 years	N/A	Balitang Bisdak	GMA Cebu	October 4, 1999	November 7, 2014	N/A	Previously known as 24 Oras Central Visayas. Note: Program was suspended due to the COVID-19 pandemic in Cebu City for two weeks, but it resumed after the city reverted their quarantine status on July 13, 2020.
27 years	N/A	Balitang Bisdak	GMA Cebu	November 10, 2014	January 29, 2016	N/A	Previously known as 24 Oras Central Visayas. Note: Program was suspended due to the COVID-19 pandemic in Cebu City for two weeks, but it resumed after the city reverted their quarantine status on July 13, 2020.
27 years	N/A	Balitang Bisdak	GMA Cebu	February 1, 2016	present	N/A	Previously known as 24 Oras Central Visayas. Note: Program was suspended due to the COVID-19 pandemic in Cebu City for two weeks, but it resumed after the city reverted their quarantine status on July 13, 2020.
27 years	N/A	Balitang Bisdak	GMA News TV (GMA Regional TV Strip)	May 19, 2020	February 16, 2021	N/A	Previously known as 24 Oras Central Visayas. Note: Program was suspended due to the COVID-19 pandemic in Cebu City for two weeks, but it resumed after the city reverted their quarantine status on July 13, 2020.
27 years	N/A	Balitang Bisdak	GTV (Regional TV Strip)	February 23, 2021	July 20, 2021	N/A	Previously known as 24 Oras Central Visayas. Note: Program was suspended due to the COVID-19 pandemic in Cebu City for two weeks, but it resumed after the city reverted their quarantine status on July 13, 2020.
27 years	N/A	Ratsada Balita	GMA Iloilo	October 4, 1999	November 7, 2014	N/A	Previously known as Ratsada and 24 Oras Western Visayas.
27 years	N/A	Ratsada Balita	GMA Iloilo	November 10, 2014	July 17, 2015	N/A	Previously known as Ratsada and 24 Oras Western Visayas.
27 years	N/A	Ratsada Balita	GMA Iloilo	July 20, 2015	November 13, 2015	N/A	Previously known as Ratsada and 24 Oras Western Visayas.
27 years	N/A	Ratsada Balita	GMA Iloilo	June 29, 2026	present	N/A	Previously known as Ratsada and 24 Oras Western Visayas.
27 years	N/A	ANC Headlines	ANC	October 11, 1999	November 30, 2024	N/A	2nd longest-running hourly news program. Replaced by News Patrol in 2024 until 2026.
27 years	N/A	ANC Headlines	ANC	May 1, 2026	present	N/A	2nd longest-running hourly news program. Replaced by News Patrol in 2024 until 2026.
26 years	N/A	Unang Hirit	GMA	December 6, 1999	present	6,884 (as of July 17, 2026)	Longest-running Filipino language morning show in the Philippines.
26 years	N/A	Lakbayin Ang Magandang Pilipinas	PTV/NBN	2000	present	N/A	
23 years	N/A	Imbestigador	GMA	August 2, 2000	September 9, 2023	731	
23 years	N/A	Imbestigador	Pinoy Hits	January 21, 2023	September 9, 2023	731	
24 years	N/A	Straight from the Shoulder	MBC 11	1970	September 22, 1972	N/A	Note: The show did not air from 1972 to 1987.
24 years	N/A	Straight from the Shoulder	GMA	January 14, 1987	September 7, 1994	N/A	Note: The show did not air from 1972 to 1987.
30 years	N/A	Oras ng Himala	IBC	1996	2001	N/A	Longest religious show, hosted by minister Apostle Renato Castillo. Note: The show had a channel under Rajah Broadcasting Network's DZRJ-DTV as the Oras ng Himala Channel, prior to a blocktime agreement with the Jesus is Our Shield Worldwide Ministries which features the broadcasts of the Oras ng Himala show (later was replaced by Timeless TV). In addition, the radio version of the show is heard on various radio stations, like DZRJ-AM (and seen on DZRJ RadioVision), DZME (and seen on DZME RadyoTV), DWBL, among others.
30 years	N/A	Oras ng Himala	SBN	2001	December 30, 2007	N/A	
30 years	N/A	Oras ng Himala	UNTV	2003	July 9, 2004	N/A	
30 years	N/A	Oras ng Himala	RPN	2006	2007	N/A	
30 years	N/A	Oras ng Himala	NBN/PTV	December 10, 2007	August 31, 2021	N/A	
30 years	N/A	Oras ng Himala	NBN/PTV	February 13, 2023	present	N/A	
30 years	N/A	Oras ng Himala	TV5	December 14, 2022	present	N/A	
30 years	N/A	Oras ng Himala	Solar Sports, Solar Flix	August 1, 2023	present	N/A	
30 years	N/A	Oras ng Himala	One PH	September 30, 2023	present	N/A	
25 years	N/A	Family Feud Philippines	ABC	November 19, 2001	December 28, 2002	N/A	3rd long running game show, the Philippine version of the American series of the same name.
25 years	N/A	Family Feud Philippines	GMA	October 13, 2008	July 1, 2011	N/A	3rd long running game show, the Philippine version of the American series of the same name.
25 years	N/A	Family Feud Philippines	GMA	March 21, 2022	June 9, 2023	N/A	3rd long running game show, the Philippine version of the American series of the same name.
25 years	N/A	Family Feud Philippines	GMA	October 2, 2023	present	N/A	3rd long running game show, the Philippine version of the American series of the same name.
25 years	N/A	Family Feud Philippines	ABS-CBN	April 9, 2016	May 7, 2017	N/A	3rd long running game show, the Philippine version of the American series of the same name.
21 years	10	Wansapanataym	ABS-CBN	June 22, 1997	February 27, 2005	792	Longest-running fantasy anthology television series. Note: The show did not air from 2005 to 2010.
21 years	10	Wansapanataym	ABS-CBN	September 11, 2010	April 7, 2019	792	Longest-running fantasy anthology television series. Note: The show did not air from 2005 to 2010.
21 years	N/A	TV Patrol Cagayan Valley	ABS-CBN Isabela	January 27, 1997	December 31, 2004	N/A	Previously known as TV Patrol Tuguegarao and TV Patrol Isabela.
21 years	N/A	TV Patrol Cagayan Valley	ABS-CBN Isabela	January 3, 2005	June 29, 2018	N/A	Previously known as TV Patrol Tuguegarao and TV Patrol Isabela.
22 years	N/A	Biyaheng Langit	RPN	April 8, 2000	March 10, 2007	N/A	Produced by Heavenly Images Productions for Television, Inc.
22 years	N/A	Biyaheng Langit	IBC	January 5, 2008	September 13, 2013	N/A	Produced by Heavenly Images Productions for Television, Inc.
22 years	N/A	Biyaheng Langit	PTV	September 22, 2013	August 31, 2019	N/A	Produced by Heavenly Images Productions for Television, Inc.
22 years	N/A	Biyaheng Langit	RJDigiTV	September 7, 2019	October 22, 2022	N/A	Produced by Heavenly Images Productions for Television, Inc.
22 years	N/A	Biyaheng Langit	Bilyonaryo News Channel	2025	present	N/A	Produced by Heavenly Images Productions for Television, Inc.
21 years	N/A	Family TV Mass	IBC	August 4, 2002	July 27, 2014		
21 years	N/A	Family TV Mass	IBC	January 4, 2015	March 3, 2019		
21 years	N/A	Family TV Mass	GMA	August 3, 2014	December 28, 2014		
21 years	N/A	Family TV Mass	5 Plus/One Sports	March 10, 2019	present		
21 years	N/A	Friends Again	IBC	1999	2007	N/A	
21 years	N/A	Friends Again	RPN	2003	December 26, 2007	N/A	
21 years	N/A	Friends Again	SBN	2003	December 26, 2007	N/A	
21 years	N/A	Friends Again	NBN	December 27, 2007	April 2008	N/A	
21 years	N/A	Friends Again	Studio 23	April 2008	January 11, 2014	N/A	
21 years	N/A	Friends Again	Light TV	January 12, 2014	January 18, 2014	N/A	
21 years	N/A	Friends Again	S+A	January 25, 2014	March 15, 2020	N/A	
25 years	N/A	Ang Tamang Daan	Net 25	June 11, 2001	present	N/A	Iglesia ni Cristo's offshoot series related to Ang Dating Daan.
25 years	N/A	Ang Tamang Daan	INC TV	October 31, 2012	present	N/A	Iglesia ni Cristo's offshoot series related to Ang Dating Daan.
25 years	N/A	Auto Review	NBN/PTV	July 21, 2001	present	N/A	
24 years	N/A	Top Story	ANC	2002	present		Note: The show had a weekend edition until 2020 & November 30, 2024 in the ABS-CBN News Channel (ANC), citing ABS-CBN's announcement to lay-off another batch of employees, halted its Sunday newscasts in 2020, and later Saturday newscasts in 2024, and financial difficulties caused by decline in advertising revenue.
20 years	N/A	Superstar: Beyond Time	RPN/New Vision 9	1975	1995	N/A	Previously known as Superstar, The Nora Aunor Show and Superstar: The Legend.
20 years	N/A	Superstar: Beyond Time	IBC/Islands TV 13	December 1, 1989	1990	N/A	Previously known as Superstar, The Nora Aunor Show and Superstar: The Legend.
20 years	N/A	TV Patrol Ilocos	ABS-CBN Laoag	September 1, 1997	October 24, 2008	N/A	Previously known as TV Patrol Laoag.
20 years	N/A	TV Patrol Ilocos	ABS-CBN Laoag	October 27, 2008	June 29, 2018	N/A	Previously known as TV Patrol Laoag.
20 years	N/A	Maynila	GMA	December 9, 1999	August 8, 2020	N/A	Longest-running daytime drama anthology program.
24 years	N/A	Wish Ko Lang!	GMA	June 29, 2002	February 15, 2020	2,820	The show was on hiatus for five months but was revived on July 11, 2020. It serves as a replacement for the now canceled series Ilaban Natin Yan! due to the COVID-19 pandemic in the Philippines.
24 years	N/A	Wish Ko Lang!	GMA	July 11, 2020	September 5, 2026	2,820	The show was on hiatus for five months but was revived on July 11, 2020. It serves as a replacement for the now canceled series Ilaban Natin Yan! due to the COVID-19 pandemic in the Philippines.
24 years	N/A	Wish Ko Lang!	Pinoy Hits	January 21, 2023	September 15, 2024	2,820	The show was on hiatus for five months but was revived on July 11, 2020. It serves as a replacement for the now canceled series Ilaban Natin Yan! due to the COVID-19 pandemic in the Philippines.
24 years	N/A	Bitag	ABC	September 14, 2002	February 22, 2003	N/A	Including spin-off series including Bitag Live (formerly Bahala si Bitag), and Pinoy U.S. Cops Ride-Along. Produced by Bitag Media Unlimited (formerly BST Tri-Media Productions).
24 years	N/A	Bitag	IBC	2003	October 8, 2011	N/A	Including spin-off series including Bitag Live (formerly Bahala si Bitag), and Pinoy U.S. Cops Ride-Along. Produced by Bitag Media Unlimited (formerly BST Tri-Media Productions).
24 years	N/A	Bitag	IBC	September 7, 2019	November 2, 2019	N/A	Including spin-off series including Bitag Live (formerly Bahala si Bitag), and Pinoy U.S. Cops Ride-Along. Produced by Bitag Media Unlimited (formerly BST Tri-Media Productions).
24 years	N/A	Bitag	IBC	January 30, 2023 (as Bitag Live)	January 31, 2024 (as Bitag Live)	N/A	Including spin-off series including Bitag Live (formerly Bahala si Bitag), and Pinoy U.S. Cops Ride-Along. Produced by Bitag Media Unlimited (formerly BST Tri-Media Productions).
24 years	N/A	Bitag	UNTV	July 12, 2004 (as Bahala si Tulfo)	2013 (as Bitag Live)	N/A	Including spin-off series including Bitag Live (formerly Bahala si Bitag), and Pinoy U.S. Cops Ride-Along. Produced by Bitag Media Unlimited (formerly BST Tri-Media Productions).
24 years	N/A	Bitag	TV5	October 14, 2011	August 3, 2012	N/A	Including spin-off series including Bitag Live (formerly Bahala si Bitag), and Pinoy U.S. Cops Ride-Along. Produced by Bitag Media Unlimited (formerly BST Tri-Media Productions).
24 years	N/A	Bitag	PTV (syndicated)	August 11, 2012	July 6, 2019	N/A	Including spin-off series including Bitag Live (formerly Bahala si Bitag), and Pinoy U.S. Cops Ride-Along. Produced by Bitag Media Unlimited (formerly BST Tri-Media Productions).
24 years	N/A	Bitag	PTV (syndicated)	August 15, 2017 (as Bitag Live)	January 6, 2023 (as Bitag Live)	N/A	Including spin-off series including Bitag Live (formerly Bahala si Bitag), and Pinoy U.S. Cops Ride-Along. Produced by Bitag Media Unlimited (formerly BST Tri-Media Productions).
24 years	N/A	Bitag	AksyonTV	2013	June 30, 2017	N/A	Including spin-off series including Bitag Live (formerly Bahala si Bitag), and Pinoy U.S. Cops Ride-Along. Produced by Bitag Media Unlimited (formerly BST Tri-Media Productions).
23 years	N/A	Magpakailanman	GMA	December 2, 2002	December 27, 2007	N/A	3rd longest-running drama anthology television series. Note: The show did not air from 2007 to 2012.
23 years	N/A	Magpakailanman	GMA	November 17, 2012	present	N/A	3rd longest-running drama anthology television series. Note: The show did not air from 2007 to 2012.
23 years	N/A	Magpakailanman	GTV	March 23, 2024	present	N/A	3rd longest-running drama anthology television series. Note: The show did not air from 2007 to 2012.
23 years	N/A	Magpakailanman	Pinoy Hits	March 23, 2024	September 14, 2024	N/A	3rd longest-running drama anthology television series. Note: The show did not air from 2007 to 2012.
21 years	N/A	News at Seven Cebu	GMA Cebu	1978	October 1, 1999	N/A	
23 years	N/A	Kingdom Upclose	SMNI	2003	present	N/A	
23 years	N/A	Give Us This Day	SMNI Davao/SMNI/SMNI News Channel	May 28, 2003	December 18, 2023	N/A	The flagship religious program of the Kingdom of Jesus Christ, hosted by Apollo Quiboloy. Note: Although, the program stopped its airing on free TV, it continues to air on cable or satellite. In addition, the network (SMNI) has been a subject to various criticisms, which includes centering on right-wing populist bias, handling its own coverage through forms of disinformation, stopping its radio and television operations in 2023 and various criticisms of the KOJC church, which includes the 2024 Senate hearing, and the arrest of Apollo Quiboloy in the KOJC Compound in Davao City.
22 years	N/A	TV Patrol Weekend	ABS-CBN	February 14, 2004	May 3, 2020	N/A	Originally known as TV Patrol Sabado (Saturdays; February 14, 2004 – June 26, 2010) and TV Patrol Linggo (Sundays; May 9, 2004 – June 27, 2010).
22 years	N/A	TV Patrol Weekend	DZMM TeleRadyo	April 14, 2007	June 27, 2010	N/A	Originally known as TV Patrol Sabado (Saturdays; February 14, 2004 – June 26, 2010) and TV Patrol Linggo (Sundays; May 9, 2004 – June 27, 2010).
22 years	N/A	TV Patrol Weekend	DZMM TeleRadyo	March 21, 2020	May 3, 2020	N/A	Originally known as TV Patrol Sabado (Saturdays; February 14, 2004 – June 26, 2010) and TV Patrol Linggo (Sundays; May 9, 2004 – June 27, 2010).
22 years	N/A	TV Patrol Weekend	DZMM TeleRadyo	May 31, 2025	present	N/A	Originally known as TV Patrol Sabado (Saturdays; February 14, 2004 – June 26, 2010) and TV Patrol Linggo (Sundays; May 9, 2004 – June 27, 2010).
22 years	N/A	TV Patrol Weekend	ANC	March 29, 2020	present	N/A	Originally known as TV Patrol Sabado (Saturdays; February 14, 2004 – June 26, 2010) and TV Patrol Linggo (Sundays; May 9, 2004 – June 27, 2010).
22 years	N/A	TV Patrol Weekend	TeleRadyo	May 9, 2020	June 25, 2023	N/A	Originally known as TV Patrol Sabado (Saturdays; February 14, 2004 – June 26, 2010) and TV Patrol Linggo (Sundays; May 9, 2004 – June 27, 2010).
22 years	N/A	TV Patrol Weekend	Cine Mo!	May 9, 2020	July 26, 2020	N/A	Originally known as TV Patrol Sabado (Saturdays; February 14, 2004 – June 26, 2010) and TV Patrol Linggo (Sundays; May 9, 2004 – June 27, 2010).
22 years	N/A	TV Patrol Weekend	Kapamilya Channel	August 1, 2020	present	N/A	Originally known as TV Patrol Sabado (Saturdays; February 14, 2004 – June 26, 2010) and TV Patrol Linggo (Sundays; May 9, 2004 – June 27, 2010).
22 years	N/A	TV Patrol Weekend	A2Z	January 1, 2022	present	N/A	Originally known as TV Patrol Sabado (Saturdays; February 14, 2004 – June 26, 2010) and TV Patrol Linggo (Sundays; May 9, 2004 – June 27, 2010).
22 years	N/A	TV Patrol Weekend	TeleRadyo Serbisyo	July 1, 2023	May 25, 2025	N/A	Originally known as TV Patrol Sabado (Saturdays; February 14, 2004 – June 26, 2010) and TV Patrol Linggo (Sundays; May 9, 2004 – June 27, 2010).
22 years	N/A	TV Patrol Weekend	All TV	April 20, 2024	present	N/A	Originally known as TV Patrol Sabado (Saturdays; February 14, 2004 – June 26, 2010) and TV Patrol Linggo (Sundays; May 9, 2004 – June 27, 2010).
22 years	N/A	TV Patrol Weekend	PRTV Prime Media	June 1, 2024	present	N/A	Originally known as TV Patrol Sabado (Saturdays; February 14, 2004 – June 26, 2010) and TV Patrol Linggo (Sundays; May 9, 2004 – June 27, 2010).
20 years	847	RPN NewsBreak	RPN	April 5, 1982	October 8, 1989	N/A	Longest-running hourly news program. Note: The program did not air from 1989 to 1994.
20 years	847	RPN NewsBreak	RPN	October 3, 1994	March 21, 2003	N/A	Longest-running hourly news program. Note: The program did not air from 1989 to 1994.
20 years	N/A	Balita Ngayon	ABS-CBN	February 20, 1967	September 22, 1972	N/A	Note: The newscast did not air from 1972 to 1986.
20 years	N/A	Balita Ngayon	ABS-CBN	September 15, 1986	February 27, 1987	N/A	Note: The newscast did not air from 1972 to 1986.
20 years	N/A	CNN Philippines Sports Desk	Solar Sports	2004	2007	N/A	Previously known as Solar Sports Desk and 9TV Sports Desk. Also known as Sports Desk.
20 years	N/A	CNN Philippines Sports Desk	Solar News Channel/9TV	December 3, 2012	March 13, 2015	N/A	Previously known as Solar Sports Desk and 9TV Sports Desk. Also known as Sports Desk.
20 years	N/A	CNN Philippines Sports Desk	CNN Philippines	March 16, 2015	January 26, 2024	N/A	Previously known as Solar Sports Desk and 9TV Sports Desk. Also known as Sports Desk.
20 years	N/A	Feast TV	RPN	2004	2007	N/A	Previously known as Kerygma TV.
20 years	N/A	Feast TV	SBN	2004	2007	N/A	Previously known as Kerygma TV.
20 years	N/A	Feast TV	ABC/TV5	2007	2010	N/A	Previously known as Kerygma TV.
20 years	N/A	Feast TV	IBC	August 7, 2011	January 28, 2024	N/A	Previously known as Kerygma TV.
22 years	N/A	PBA on One Sports	ABC/TV5	February 22, 2004	August 20, 2008	N/A	Previously known as PBA on ABC, PBA on AKTV,PBA on TV5 and PBA on ESPN 5. Note: The games did not air in 2008–2011.
22 years	N/A	PBA on One Sports	AKTV (IBC)	October 2, 2011	October 25, 2013	N/A	Previously known as PBA on ABC, PBA on AKTV,PBA on TV5 and PBA on ESPN 5. Note: The games did not air in 2008–2011.
22 years	N/A	PBA on One Sports	AksyonTV	September 30, 2012	July 17, 2015	N/A	Previously known as PBA on ABC, PBA on AKTV,PBA on TV5 and PBA on ESPN 5. Note: The games did not air in 2008–2011.
22 years	N/A	PBA on One Sports	TV5	November 17, 2013	April 22, 2023	N/A	Previously known as PBA on ABC, PBA on AKTV,PBA on TV5 and PBA on ESPN 5. Note: The games did not air in 2008–2011.
22 years	N/A	PBA on One Sports	Hyper	October 21, 2015	May 18, 2016	N/A	Previously known as PBA on ABC, PBA on AKTV,PBA on TV5 and PBA on ESPN 5. Note: The games did not air in 2008–2011.
22 years	N/A	PBA on One Sports	PBA Rush	July 15, 2016	present	N/A	Previously known as PBA on ABC, PBA on AKTV,PBA on TV5 and PBA on ESPN 5. Note: The games did not air in 2008–2011.
22 years	N/A	PBA on One Sports	One Sports	March 8, 2020	present	N/A	Previously known as PBA on ABC, PBA on AKTV,PBA on TV5 and PBA on ESPN 5. Note: The games did not air in 2008–2011.
22 years	N/A	PBA on One Sports	RPTV (RPN)	February 1, 2024	present	N/A	Previously known as PBA on ABC, PBA on AKTV,PBA on TV5 and PBA on ESPN 5. Note: The games did not air in 2008–2011.
22 years	N/A	Kapuso Mo, Jessica Soho	GMA	November 7, 2004	present	1,141 (as of October 18, 2026)	Longest-running news magazine show.
22 years	N/A	Kapuso Mo, Jessica Soho	Pinoy Hits	January 22, 2023	September 15, 2024	1,141 (as of October 18, 2026)	Longest-running news magazine show.
22 years	N/A	Kapuso Mo, Jessica Soho	GTV	February 5, 2023	present	1,141 (as of October 18, 2026)	Longest-running news magazine show.
22 years	N/A	24 Oras	GMA	March 15, 2004	present	4,000+	2nd longest-running Filipino-language evening newscast.
22 years	N/A	24 Oras	GMA News TV	March 23, 2020	February 19, 2021	4,000+	2nd longest-running Filipino-language evening newscast.
22 years	N/A	24 Oras	GTV	February 22, 2021	present	4,000+	2nd longest-running Filipino-language evening newscast.
22 years	N/A	24 Oras	Pinoy Hits	January 16, 2023	September 19, 2024	4,000+	2nd longest-running Filipino-language evening newscast.
22 years	N/A	24 Oras	I Heart Movies	March 6, 2023	October 13, 2023	4,000+	2nd longest-running Filipino-language evening newscast.
22 years	N/A	Rated Korina	ABS-CBN	May 30, 2004	May 3, 2020	1,142	Also known as Rated K. Note: Program was eventually cancelled due to ABS-CBN franchise renewal controversy on May 3, 2020, but the show was revived after 5 months as Rated Korina on October 24, 2021.
22 years	N/A	Rated Korina	TV5	October 24, 2020	present	1,142	Also known as Rated K. Note: Program was eventually cancelled due to ABS-CBN franchise renewal controversy on May 3, 2020, but the show was revived after 5 months as Rated Korina on October 24, 2021.
22 years	N/A	Rated Korina	Kapamilya Channel	June 19, 2021	present	1,142	Also known as Rated K. Note: Program was eventually cancelled due to ABS-CBN franchise renewal controversy on May 3, 2020, but the show was revived after 5 months as Rated Korina on October 24, 2021.
22 years	N/A	Rated Korina	All TV	June 29, 2025	present	1,142	Also known as Rated K. Note: Program was eventually cancelled due to ABS-CBN franchise renewal controversy on May 3, 2020, but the show was revived after 5 months as Rated Korina on October 24, 2021.
22 years	N/A	KNC Show	UNTV	July 16, 2004	February 22, 2026	N/A	Note: The show went on hiatus following the finale of the first incarnation on February 22, 2026, but resumed with the new incarnation after three months later on June 7, 2026.
22 years	N/A	KNC Show	UNTV	June 7, 2026	present	N/A	Note: The show went on hiatus following the finale of the first incarnation on February 22, 2026, but resumed with the new incarnation after three months later on June 7, 2026.
22 years	N/A	Reporter's Notebook	GMA	June 1, 2004	July 16, 2020	637	
22 years	N/A	Reporter's Notebook	GMA	January 7, 2021	October 21, 2021	637	
22 years	N/A	Reporter's Notebook	GMA	February 4, 2023	present	637	
22 years	N/A	Reporter's Notebook	GMA News TV	July 23, 2020	December 31, 2020	637	
22 years	N/A	Reporter's Notebook	GTV	October 28, 2021	January 29, 2023	637	
21 years	N/A	Executive Class	ANC	2005	present	N/A	
20 years	N/A	Goin' Bulilit	ABS-CBN	February 6, 2005	August 4, 2019	684	Note: The program did not air from 2019 to 2024, from September 28, 2024, to March 9, 2025.
20 years	N/A	Goin' Bulilit	Kapamilya Channel	July 1, 2024	September 27, 2024	684	Note: The program did not air from 2019 to 2024, from September 28, 2024, to March 9, 2025.
20 years	N/A	Goin' Bulilit	Kapamilya Channel	March 10, 2025	June 27, 2025	684	Note: The program did not air from 2019 to 2024, from September 28, 2024, to March 9, 2025.
20 years	N/A	Goin' Bulilit	A2Z	July 1, 2024	September 27, 2024	684	Note: The program did not air from 2019 to 2024, from September 28, 2024, to March 9, 2025.
20 years	N/A	Goin' Bulilit	A2Z	March 10, 2025	June 27, 2025	684	Note: The program did not air from 2019 to 2024, from September 28, 2024, to March 9, 2025.
20 years	N/A	Goin' Bulilit	All TV	July 1, 2024	September 27, 2024	684	Note: The program did not air from 2019 to 2024, from September 28, 2024, to March 9, 2025.
20 years	N/A	Goin' Bulilit	All TV	March 10, 2025	June 27, 2025	684	Note: The program did not air from 2019 to 2024, from September 28, 2024, to March 9, 2025.
20 years	N/A	Business Nightly	ANC	2000	2020	N/A	
20 years	19	Pinoy Big Brother	ABS-CBN	August 21, 2005	August 4, 2019	N/A	Longest-running reality show and longest-running show based on a format.
20 years	19	Pinoy Big Brother	Kapamilya Channel	December 6, 2020	October 26, 2024	N/A	Longest-running reality show and longest-running show based on a format.
20 years	19	Pinoy Big Brother	A2Z	December 6, 2020	October 26, 2024	N/A	Longest-running reality show and longest-running show based on a format.
20 years	19	Pinoy Big Brother	TV5	March 8, 2021	March 14, 2021	N/A	Longest-running reality show and longest-running show based on a format.
20 years	19	Pinoy Big Brother	TV5	July 20, 2024	October 26, 2024	N/A	Longest-running reality show and longest-running show based on a format.
20 years	19	Pinoy Big Brother	GMA	March 9, 2025	present	N/A	Longest-running reality show and longest-running show based on a format.
21 years	N/A	Balitanghali	QTV/Q	November 11, 2005	February 18, 2011	N/A	3rd longest-running noontime newscast. Note: Also known as Balita Ko from September 4-November 10, 2023.
21 years	N/A	Balitanghali	GMA News TV	February 28, 2011	February 19, 2021	N/A	3rd longest-running noontime newscast. Note: Also known as Balita Ko from September 4-November 10, 2023.
21 years	N/A	Balitanghali	GTV	February 22, 2021	present	N/A	3rd longest-running noontime newscast. Note: Also known as Balita Ko from September 4-November 10, 2023.
21 years	N/A	Balitanghali	Heart of Asia	September 19, 2022	October 6, 2023	N/A	3rd longest-running noontime newscast. Note: Also known as Balita Ko from September 4-November 10, 2023.
21 years	N/A	Balitanghali	I Heart Movies	September 19, 2022	October 6, 2023	N/A	3rd longest-running noontime newscast. Note: Also known as Balita Ko from September 4-November 10, 2023.
21 years	N/A	Balitanghali	Pinoy Hits	January 16, 2023	September 19, 2024	N/A	3rd longest-running noontime newscast. Note: Also known as Balita Ko from September 4-November 10, 2023.
20 years	12	Asian Air Safari	ANC	2006	present	N/A	
21 years	N/A	News Patrol	ABS-CBN	September 5, 2005	May 5, 2020	N/A	Longest-running hourly news program. Note: Program was suspended due to the ABS-CBN franchise renewal controversy on May 5, 2020, but resumed after three days on May 8, 2020.
21 years	N/A	News Patrol	TeleRadyo	May 8, 2020	June 12, 2020	N/A	Longest-running hourly news program. Note: Program was suspended due to the ABS-CBN franchise renewal controversy on May 5, 2020, but resumed after three days on May 8, 2020.
21 years	N/A	News Patrol	Kapamilya Channel	June 15, 2020	present	N/A	Longest-running hourly news program. Note: Program was suspended due to the ABS-CBN franchise renewal controversy on May 5, 2020, but resumed after three days on May 8, 2020.
21 years	N/A	News Patrol	A2Z	June 20, 2022	present	N/A	Longest-running hourly news program. Note: Program was suspended due to the ABS-CBN franchise renewal controversy on May 5, 2020, but resumed after three days on May 8, 2020.
21 years	N/A	News Patrol	Jeepney TV	January 2023	December 22, 2023	N/A	Longest-running hourly news program. Note: Program was suspended due to the ABS-CBN franchise renewal controversy on May 5, 2020, but resumed after three days on May 8, 2020.
21 years	N/A	News Patrol	ANC	December 2, 2024	April 30, 2026	N/A	Longest-running hourly news program. Note: Program was suspended due to the ABS-CBN franchise renewal controversy on May 5, 2020, but resumed after three days on May 8, 2020.
21 years	N/A	News Patrol	All TV	January 3, 2026	present	N/A	Longest-running hourly news program. Note: Program was suspended due to the ABS-CBN franchise renewal controversy on May 5, 2020, but resumed after three days on May 8, 2020.
20 years	N/A	PTV Sports	NBN/PTV	April 17, 2006	December 30, 2016	N/A	Also known as Teledyaryo Sports from 2006 to 2008 again from 2010 to 2012 then NBN Sports from 2008 to 2010. Note: The show did not air from 2016 to 2017 again from September 8 to October 14, 2023. The show also aired on PTV Sports Network.
20 years	N/A	PTV Sports	NBN/PTV	October 16, 2017	September 8, 2023	N/A	Also known as Teledyaryo Sports from 2006 to 2008 again from 2010 to 2012 then NBN Sports from 2008 to 2010. Note: The show did not air from 2016 to 2017 again from September 8 to October 14, 2023. The show also aired on PTV Sports Network.
20 years	N/A	PTV Sports	NBN/PTV	October 14, 2023	present	N/A	Also known as Teledyaryo Sports from 2006 to 2008 again from 2010 to 2012 then NBN Sports from 2008 to 2010. Note: The show did not air from 2016 to 2017 again from September 8 to October 14, 2023. The show also aired on PTV Sports Network.
20 years	N/A	PTV Sports	IBC	August 29, 2022	September 8, 2023	N/A	Also known as Teledyaryo Sports from 2006 to 2008 again from 2010 to 2012 then NBN Sports from 2008 to 2010. Note: The show did not air from 2016 to 2017 again from September 8 to October 14, 2023. The show also aired on PTV Sports Network.
20 years	N/A	PTV Sports	PTV Sports Network	November 18, 2024	present	N/A	Also known as Teledyaryo Sports from 2006 to 2008 again from 2010 to 2012 then NBN Sports from 2008 to 2010. Note: The show did not air from 2016 to 2017 again from September 8 to October 14, 2023. The show also aired on PTV Sports Network.

== 10–19 years ==
Length	Number of seasons	Series	Network	First broadcast	Last broadcast	Number of episodes	Notes
19 years	19	UAAP on ABS-CBN Sports	Studio 23	July 15, 2000	January 16, 2014	N/A	Longest-running broadcast of a collegiate sports league by a single producer.
19 years	19	UAAP on ABS-CBN Sports	S+A	January 18, 2014	March 8, 2020	N/A	Longest-running broadcast of a collegiate sports league by a single producer.
19 years	N/A	Talkback	ANC	October 31, 2000	March 24, 2020	N/A	Longest-running current affairs and talk show.
19 years	19	Two For The Road	ABS-CBN	1967	September 21, 1972	N/A	Note: The show did not aired from 1972 to 1979.
19 years	19	Two For The Road	GMA	1979	1986	N/A	Note: The show did not aired from 1972 to 1979.
18 years	19	GMA Supershow	GMA	May 7, 1978	January 26, 1997	990	2nd longest-running Sunday noontime musical variety show; previously known as Germside and then as Germspesyal.
19 years	21	Startalk	GMA	October 8, 1995	September 12, 2015	1,024	Longest-running weekly entertainment news and talk show.
19 years	N/A	Walang Tulugan with the Master Showman	GMA	February 8, 1997	February 13, 2016	977	Longest-running late night variety show.
19 years	N/A	TV Patrol North Central Luzon	ABS-CBN Dagupan	January 18, 1999	October 13, 2006	N/A	Previously known as TV Patrol Dagupan.
19 years	N/A	TV Patrol North Central Luzon	ABS-CBN Dagupan	October 16, 2006	June 29, 2018	N/A	Previously known as TV Patrol Dagupan.
19 years	N/A	TV Patrol Central Mindanao	ABS-CBN Cotabato	April 12, 1999	June 29, 2018	N/A	Previously known as TV Patrol Cotabato.
18 years	N/A	ABS-CBN News Advisory	ABS-CBN	September 15, 1986	September 4, 2005	N/A	3rd longest-running hourly news program.
18 years	N/A	TV Patrol Caraga	ABS-CBN Butuan	July 5, 1999	June 29, 2018	N/A	Previously known as TV Patrol Butuan.
18 years	N/A	D'X-Man	UNTV	October 11, 2004	July 2, 2017	N/A	Note: The show went on hiatus following the finale of the first incarnation on July 2, 2017, but resumed with the new incarnation after eight weeks later on August 22, 2017.
18 years	N/A	D'X-Man	UNTV	August 22, 2017	September 17, 2023	N/A	Note: The show went on hiatus following the finale of the first incarnation on July 2, 2017, but resumed with the new incarnation after eight weeks later on August 22, 2017.
18 years	N/A	Stop, Look, & Listen	ABS-CBN	September 28, 1968	April 14, 1972		Originally as noon time television of ABS-CBN hosted by Eddie Mesa before it was revived and reformat as talk show on GMA. Note: The show did not air 1972 to 1983.
18 years	N/A	Stop, Look, & Listen	GMA	1983	1986		Originally as noon time television of ABS-CBN hosted by Eddie Mesa before it was revived and reformat as talk show on GMA. Note: The show did not air 1972 to 1983.
19 years	N/A	Asenso Ka Pinoy	ABC	July 3, 2005	August 2, 2008	N/A	Longest running lifestyle program, produced by Radyo Pilipino (formerly known as Radio Corporation of the Philippines (RCP/RadioCorp) until 2019) and Spotlight Media Services, Inc. Formerly known as Asenso Pinoy from 2005 to 2023. Note: The program was suspended due to the COVID-19 pandemic as well as the ABS-CBN franchise renewal controversy on March 14, 2020, but resumed after eight months on November 14, 2020, a month following the launch of A2Z on October 10.
19 years	N/A	Asenso Ka Pinoy	IBC	2006	2011	N/A	Longest running lifestyle program, produced by Radyo Pilipino (formerly known as Radio Corporation of the Philippines (RCP/RadioCorp) until 2019) and Spotlight Media Services, Inc. Formerly known as Asenso Pinoy from 2005 to 2023. Note: The program was suspended due to the COVID-19 pandemic as well as the ABS-CBN franchise renewal controversy on March 14, 2020, but resumed after eight months on November 14, 2020, a month following the launch of A2Z on October 10.
19 years	N/A	Asenso Ka Pinoy	NBN/PTV	2008	2014	N/A	Longest running lifestyle program, produced by Radyo Pilipino (formerly known as Radio Corporation of the Philippines (RCP/RadioCorp) until 2019) and Spotlight Media Services, Inc. Formerly known as Asenso Pinoy from 2005 to 2023. Note: The program was suspended due to the COVID-19 pandemic as well as the ABS-CBN franchise renewal controversy on March 14, 2020, but resumed after eight months on November 14, 2020, a month following the launch of A2Z on October 10.
19 years	N/A	Asenso Ka Pinoy	Studio 23	2013	January 11, 2014	N/A	Longest running lifestyle program, produced by Radyo Pilipino (formerly known as Radio Corporation of the Philippines (RCP/RadioCorp) until 2019) and Spotlight Media Services, Inc. Formerly known as Asenso Pinoy from 2005 to 2023. Note: The program was suspended due to the COVID-19 pandemic as well as the ABS-CBN franchise renewal controversy on March 14, 2020, but resumed after eight months on November 14, 2020, a month following the launch of A2Z on October 10.
19 years	N/A	Asenso Ka Pinoy	S+A	February 15, 2014	March 15, 2020	N/A	Longest running lifestyle program, produced by Radyo Pilipino (formerly known as Radio Corporation of the Philippines (RCP/RadioCorp) until 2019) and Spotlight Media Services, Inc. Formerly known as Asenso Pinoy from 2005 to 2023. Note: The program was suspended due to the COVID-19 pandemic as well as the ABS-CBN franchise renewal controversy on March 14, 2020, but resumed after eight months on November 14, 2020, a month following the launch of A2Z on October 10.
19 years	N/A	Asenso Ka Pinoy	A2Z	November 14, 2020	January 7, 2023	N/A	Longest running lifestyle program, produced by Radyo Pilipino (formerly known as Radio Corporation of the Philippines (RCP/RadioCorp) until 2019) and Spotlight Media Services, Inc. Formerly known as Asenso Pinoy from 2005 to 2023. Note: The program was suspended due to the COVID-19 pandemic as well as the ABS-CBN franchise renewal controversy on March 14, 2020, but resumed after eight months on November 14, 2020, a month following the launch of A2Z on October 10.
19 years	N/A	Asenso Ka Pinoy	PTV	December 2, 2023	July 13, 2024	N/A	Longest running lifestyle program, produced by Radyo Pilipino (formerly known as Radio Corporation of the Philippines (RCP/RadioCorp) until 2019) and Spotlight Media Services, Inc. Formerly known as Asenso Pinoy from 2005 to 2023. Note: The program was suspended due to the COVID-19 pandemic as well as the ABS-CBN franchise renewal controversy on March 14, 2020, but resumed after eight months on November 14, 2020, a month following the launch of A2Z on October 10.
17 years	N/A	John en Marsha	KBS/RPN/New Vision 9	November 12, 1973	March 19, 1990	405	Longest-running sitcom television series.
17 years	N/A	PBA on Vintage Sports	City2	March 7, 1982	December 1, 1983	N/A	Produced by Vintage Television, production later absorbed and transferred by Viva Entertainment as PBA on Viva TV from 2000 to 2002.
17 years	N/A	PBA on Vintage Sports	MBS/PTV	March 25, 1984	December 19, 1995	N/A	Produced by Vintage Television, production later absorbed and transferred by Viva Entertainment as PBA on Viva TV from 2000 to 2002.
17 years	N/A	PBA on Vintage Sports	IBC	February 18, 1996	December 12, 1999	N/A	Produced by Vintage Television, production later absorbed and transferred by Viva Entertainment as PBA on Viva TV from 2000 to 2002.
17 years	N/A	Chikiting Patrol	ABS-CBN	April 2, 1988	1989		Longest running news program for children, known as Chikiting Patrol: At Home Ako Dito.
17 years	N/A	Chikiting Patrol	IBC	1989	June 3, 1990		Longest running news program for children, known as Chikiting Patrol: At Home Ako Dito.
17 years	N/A	Chikiting Patrol	GMA	June 10, 1990	July 14, 2002		Longest running news program for children, known as Chikiting Patrol: At Home Ako Dito.
17 years	N/A	Chikiting Patrol	ABC	October 19, 2002	2006		Longest running news program for children, known as Chikiting Patrol: At Home Ako Dito.
17 years	N/A	Magandang Gabi... Bayan	ABS-CBN	August 21, 1988	December 31, 2005	898	
17 years	17	NCAA on ABS-CBN Sports	Studio 23	June 29, 2002	March 2, 2012	N/A	Broadcast rights were transferred to Sports5 from 2012 to 2015.
17 years	17	NCAA on ABS-CBN Sports	S+A	June 27, 2015	January 10, 2020	N/A	Broadcast rights were transferred to Sports5 from 2012 to 2015.
16 years	16	Lovingly Yours, Helen	GMA	September 7, 1980	1984	847	2nd longest-running drama anthology.
16 years	16	Lovingly Yours, Helen	GMA	March 23, 1986	September 1, 1996	847	2nd longest-running drama anthology.
16 years	16	Lovingly Yours, Helen	BBC	1984	March 16, 1986	847	2nd longest-running drama anthology.
16 years	847	RPN NewsBreak	RPN	April 5, 1982	October 8, 1989	N/A	Longest-running hourly news program. Note: The program did not air from 1989 to 1994.
16 years	847	RPN NewsBreak	RPN	October 3, 1994	March 21, 2003	N/A	Longest-running hourly news program. Note: The program did not air from 1989 to 1994.
16 years	N/A	Convergence	Net 25	July 23, 2000	2016	N/A	
17 years	N/A	Moments	Net 25	November 10, 2007	December 21, 2024	876	
19 years	N/A	The Healing Eucharist	ABS-CBN	October 28, 2007	May 3, 2020	N/A	Longest-running Catholic mass program.
19 years	N/A	The Healing Eucharist	TeleRadyo	May 10, 2020	June 28, 2020	N/A	Longest-running Catholic mass program.
19 years	N/A	The Healing Eucharist	TeleRadyo	May 9, 2021	June 25, 2023	N/A	Longest-running Catholic mass program.
19 years	N/A	The Healing Eucharist	Kapamilya Channel	June 14, 2020	present	N/A	Longest-running Catholic mass program.
19 years	N/A	The Healing Eucharist	All TV	January 4, 2026	present	N/A	Longest-running Catholic mass program.
16 years	N/A	Make My Day with Larry Henares	UNTV	July 12, 2004	March 13, 2020	N/A	
15 years	N/A	GMA News Live	GMA	January 5, 1987	July 14, 2002	N/A	Longest-running hourly news program.
15 years	9	Gandang Gabi Vice	ABS-CBN	May 22, 2011	March 8, 2020	460	Note: The program did not air from 2020 to 2026.
15 years	9	Gandang Gabi Vice	GMA	September 13, 2026	present	460	Note: The program did not air from 2020 to 2026.
15 years	N/A	Salamat Dok	ABS-CBN	April 24, 2004	March 15, 2020	1,244	
16 years	7	Pilipinas Got Talent	ABS-CBN	February 20, 2010	April 29, 2018	227	
16 years	7	Pilipinas Got Talent	Kapamilya Channel	March 29, 2025	June 22, 2025	227	
16 years	7	Pilipinas Got Talent	A2Z	March 29, 2025	June 22, 2025	227	
16 years	7	Pilipinas Got Talent	TV5	March 29, 2025	June 22, 2025	227	
15 years	N/A	The Police Hour	New Vision 9/RPN	1992	December 28, 2007	N/A	
15 years	N/A	The Buzz	ABS-CBN	June 13, 1999	April 5, 2015	835	2nd longest-running weekly entertainment news and talk show.
15 years	7	StarStruck	GMA	October 27, 2003	September 15, 2019	538	
15 years	N/A	Maayong Buntag Kapamilya	ABS-CBN Cebu	March 7, 2005	August 28, 2020	N/A	
15 years	N/A	Swak na Swak	ABS-CBN	August 21, 2006	May 3, 2020	N/A	Note: Program was suspended due to the ABS-CBN franchise renewal controversy on May 3, 2020, but it was resumed after four weeks on June 4.
15 years	N/A	Swak na Swak	ANC	June 7, 2020	April 25, 2021	N/A	Note: Program was suspended due to the ABS-CBN franchise renewal controversy on May 3, 2020, but it was resumed after four weeks on June 4.
15 years	N/A	Swak na Swak	Kapamilya Channel	October 3, 2020	September 26, 2021	N/A	Note: Program was suspended due to the ABS-CBN franchise renewal controversy on May 3, 2020, but it was resumed after four weeks on June 4.
15 years	N/A	Ang Pinaka	QTV/Q	November 13, 2005	February 20, 2011	N/A	
15 years	N/A	Ang Pinaka	GMA News TV	March 6, 2011	March 15, 2020	N/A	
17 years	N/A	It's Showtime	ABS-CBN	October 24, 2009	January 28, 2012	4,777 (as of October 17, 2026)	3rd longest-running noontime variety show; previously known as Showtime. Note: Program was suspended due to the ABS-CBN franchise renewal controversy on May 5, 2020, but resumed after five weeks, coinciding with the launch of Kapamilya Channel on June 13.
17 years	N/A	It's Showtime	ABS-CBN	February 6, 2012	May 5, 2020	4,777 (as of October 17, 2026)	3rd longest-running noontime variety show; previously known as Showtime. Note: Program was suspended due to the ABS-CBN franchise renewal controversy on May 5, 2020, but resumed after five weeks, coinciding with the launch of Kapamilya Channel on June 13.
17 years	N/A	It's Showtime	Jeepney TV	June 11, 2018	April 5, 2024	4,777 (as of October 17, 2026)	3rd longest-running noontime variety show; previously known as Showtime. Note: Program was suspended due to the ABS-CBN franchise renewal controversy on May 5, 2020, but resumed after five weeks, coinciding with the launch of Kapamilya Channel on June 13.
17 years	N/A	It's Showtime	Kapamilya Channel	June 13, 2020	present	4,777 (as of October 17, 2026)	3rd longest-running noontime variety show; previously known as Showtime. Note: Program was suspended due to the ABS-CBN franchise renewal controversy on May 5, 2020, but resumed after five weeks, coinciding with the launch of Kapamilya Channel on June 13.
17 years	N/A	It's Showtime	A2Z	October 10, 2020	present	4,777 (as of October 17, 2026)	3rd longest-running noontime variety show; previously known as Showtime. Note: Program was suspended due to the ABS-CBN franchise renewal controversy on May 5, 2020, but resumed after five weeks, coinciding with the launch of Kapamilya Channel on June 13.
17 years	N/A	It's Showtime	TV5	July 16, 2022	June 30, 2023	4,777 (as of October 17, 2026)	3rd longest-running noontime variety show; previously known as Showtime. Note: Program was suspended due to the ABS-CBN franchise renewal controversy on May 5, 2020, but resumed after five weeks, coinciding with the launch of Kapamilya Channel on June 13.
17 years	N/A	It's Showtime	GTV	July 1, 2023	December 31, 2024	4,777 (as of October 17, 2026)	3rd longest-running noontime variety show; previously known as Showtime. Note: Program was suspended due to the ABS-CBN franchise renewal controversy on May 5, 2020, but resumed after five weeks, coinciding with the launch of Kapamilya Channel on June 13.
17 years	N/A	It's Showtime	GMA	April 6, 2024	present	4,777 (as of October 17, 2026)	3rd longest-running noontime variety show; previously known as Showtime. Note: Program was suspended due to the ABS-CBN franchise renewal controversy on May 5, 2020, but resumed after five weeks, coinciding with the launch of Kapamilya Channel on June 13.
17 years	N/A	It's Showtime	All TV	June 17, 2024	present	4,777 (as of October 17, 2026)	3rd longest-running noontime variety show; previously known as Showtime. Note: Program was suspended due to the ABS-CBN franchise renewal controversy on May 5, 2020, but resumed after five weeks, coinciding with the launch of Kapamilya Channel on June 13.
19 years	N/A	Good Morning Kuya	UNTV	July 23, 2007	present	N/A	
18 years	N/A	Born to Be Wild	GMA	November 28, 2007	present	966 (as of September 20, 2026)	
18 years	N/A	Born to Be Wild	Pinoy Hits	January 22, 2023	September 15, 2024	966 (as of September 20, 2026)	
14 years	N/A	Tell The People... Now	RPN/New Vision 9	1983	1997	N/A	Previously known as Tell The People.
15 years	N/A	Dial M	PTV/NBN	April 4, 1995	1999	N/A	
15 years	N/A	Dial M	PTV/NBN	2003	2010	N/A	
15 years	N/A	Dial M	IBC	2010	2010	N/A	
14 years	N/A	Coney Reyes on Camera	RPN	May 19, 1984	February 11, 1989	N/A	
14 years	N/A	Coney Reyes on Camera	ABS-CBN	February 18, 1989	December 26, 1998	N/A	
14 years	N/A	Penpen de Sarapen	RPN/New Vision 9	1987	2001	N/A	
14 years	N/A	TV Patrol Northwestern Mindanao	ABS-CBN Pagadian	1995	2008	N/A	Previously known as TV Patrol Pagadian.
14 years	N/A	TV Patrol Northwestern Mindanao	ABS-CBN Pagadian	2008	2009	N/A	Previously known as TV Patrol Pagadian.
14 years	N/A	Emergency	GMA	October 4, 1995	March 6, 2009	635	
13 years	N/A	Flash Report	GMA	July 15, 2002	March 27, 2016	N/A	Longest-running hourly news program.
14 years	N/A	Panay Sikat	ABS-CBN Iloilo	January 16, 2006	October 12, 2018	N/A	Longest-running regional morning show. Previously known as Sikat Ka! Iloilo.
14 years	N/A	Panay Sikat	ABS-CBN Iloilo	October 15, 2018	August 28, 2020	N/A	Longest-running regional morning show. Previously known as Sikat Ka! Iloilo.
14 years	N/A	Magandang Umaga South Central Mindanao	ABS-CBN General Santos and ABS-CBN Cotabato	June 19, 2006	July 30, 2010	N/A	Longest-running regional morning show. Previously known as Magandang Umaga Socsksargen.
14 years	N/A	Magandang Umaga South Central Mindanao	ABS-CBN General Santos and ABS-CBN Cotabato	August 2, 2010	August 28, 2020	N/A	Longest-running regional morning show. Previously known as Magandang Umaga Socsksargen.
15 years	N/A	iJuander	GMA News TV	February 28, 2011	February 21, 2021		
15 years	N/A	iJuander	GTV	February 28, 2021	present		
15 years	N/A	Dobol B TV	GMA News TV	February 28, 2011	September 7, 2012		Formerly known as Dobol B sa News TV, teleradio version of Super Radyo DZBB programming and Dobol B sa GMA. Note: The program did not air from 2012 to 2017.
15 years	N/A	Dobol B TV	GMA News TV	April 24, 2017	February 21, 2021		Formerly known as Dobol B sa News TV, teleradio version of Super Radyo DZBB programming and Dobol B sa GMA. Note: The program did not air from 2012 to 2017.
15 years	N/A	Dobol B TV	GTV	February 22, 2021	present		Formerly known as Dobol B sa News TV, teleradio version of Super Radyo DZBB programming and Dobol B sa GMA. Note: The program did not air from 2012 to 2017.
15 years	N/A	Dobol B TV	GMA	March 19, 2020	April 8, 2020		Formerly known as Dobol B sa News TV, teleradio version of Super Radyo DZBB programming and Dobol B sa GMA. Note: The program did not air from 2012 to 2017.
14 years	18	Square Off	ANC	2006	March 13, 2020	N/A	
18 years	N/A	One North Central Luzon	GMA Dagupan	May 5, 2008	November 7, 2014		Previously known as 24 Oras North Central Luzon, 24 Oras Amianan and Balitang Amianan.
18 years	N/A	One North Central Luzon	GMA Dagupan	November 10, 2014	August 28, 2015		Previously known as 24 Oras North Central Luzon, 24 Oras Amianan and Balitang Amianan.
18 years	N/A	One North Central Luzon	GMA Dagupan	August 31, 2015	January 29, 2016		Previously known as 24 Oras North Central Luzon, 24 Oras Amianan and Balitang Amianan.
18 years	N/A	One North Central Luzon	GMA Dagupan	February 1, 2016	September 2, 2022		Previously known as 24 Oras North Central Luzon, 24 Oras Amianan and Balitang Amianan.
18 years	N/A	One North Central Luzon	GMA Dagupan	September 5, 2022	present		Previously known as 24 Oras North Central Luzon, 24 Oras Amianan and Balitang Amianan.
18 years	N/A	One North Central Luzon	GMA News TV (GMA Regional TV Strip)	May 18, 2020	February 15, 2021		Previously known as 24 Oras North Central Luzon, 24 Oras Amianan and Balitang Amianan.
18 years	N/A	One North Central Luzon	GTV (Regional TV Strip)	February 22, 2021	July 19, 2021		Previously known as 24 Oras North Central Luzon, 24 Oras Amianan and Balitang Amianan.
18 years	N/A	The Word Exposed	TV5	August 10, 2008	2010		Longest running Bible-based religious program for Catholics, produced by Jesuit Communications Foundation. Note: An audio version of the program is also heard on campus radio station Radyo Katipunan.
18 years	N/A	The Word Exposed	NBN/PTV	2010	2011		Longest running Bible-based religious program for Catholics, produced by Jesuit Communications Foundation. Note: An audio version of the program is also heard on campus radio station Radyo Katipunan.
18 years	N/A	The Word Exposed	Studio 23	February 20, 2011	January 12, 2014		Longest running Bible-based religious program for Catholics, produced by Jesuit Communications Foundation. Note: An audio version of the program is also heard on campus radio station Radyo Katipunan.
18 years	N/A	The Word Exposed	ANC	February 20, 2011	present		Longest running Bible-based religious program for Catholics, produced by Jesuit Communications Foundation. Note: An audio version of the program is also heard on campus radio station Radyo Katipunan.
18 years	N/A	The Word Exposed	S+A	February 9, 2014	May 3, 2020		Longest running Bible-based religious program for Catholics, produced by Jesuit Communications Foundation. Note: An audio version of the program is also heard on campus radio station Radyo Katipunan.
18 years	N/A	The Word Exposed	SolarFlix	November 13, 2022	present		Longest running Bible-based religious program for Catholics, produced by Jesuit Communications Foundation. Note: An audio version of the program is also heard on campus radio station Radyo Katipunan.
18 years	N/A	The Word Exposed	Bilyonaryo News Channel	October 13, 2024	present		Longest running Bible-based religious program for Catholics, produced by Jesuit Communications Foundation. Note: An audio version of the program is also heard on campus radio station Radyo Katipunan.
13 years	N/A	Buhay Pinoy	RBS/GMA	1962	September 1972	N/A	
13 years	N/A	Buhay Pinoy	RBS/GMA	1973	1975	N/A	
13 years	N/A	Iskul Bukol	IBC	October 3, 1978	1988	N/A	
13 years	N/A	SOP	GMA	February 2, 1997	February 28, 2010	672	3rd longest-running Sunday noontime musical variety show.
12 years	N/A	Adyenda	ZOE TV	August 23, 2005	August 30, 2005	N/A	
12 years	N/A	Adyenda	GMA	2005	March 17, 2018	N/A	
12 years	N/A	Adyenda	QTV/Q	November 11, 2005	February 18, 2011	N/A	
12 years	N/A	Adyenda	ZOE TV / Light TV	March 13, 2008	March 15, 2018	N/A	
12 years	N/A	Adyenda	GMA News TV	March 4, 2011	March 19, 2018	N/A	
13 years	N/A	Day Off	QTV/Q	November 12, 2005	February 19, 2011	584	
13 years	N/A	Day Off	GMA News TV	March 5, 2011	May 25, 2019	584	
13 years	N/A	Bandila	ABS-CBN	July 3, 2006	March 17, 2020	N/A	Note: Program was suspended and later cancelled due to the COVID-19 pandemic as well as the ABS-CBN franchise renewal controversy on March 17, 2020.
12 years	N/A	Umagang Kay Ganda	ABS-CBN	June 25, 2007	May 5, 2020	3,424	Note: Program was suspended and later cancelled due to the ABS-CBN franchise renewal controversy on May 5, 2020, a day following their resumption on May 4, 2020.
12 years	7	Talentadong Pinoy	TV5	August 16, 2008	August 18, 2013	N/A	The program was also known as Talentadong Pinoy 2014 and Bangon Talentadong Pinoy.
12 years	7	Talentadong Pinoy	TV5	August 16, 2014	December 13, 2014	N/A	The program was also known as Talentadong Pinoy 2014 and Bangon Talentadong Pinoy.
12 years	7	Talentadong Pinoy	TV5	August 15, 2020	March 13, 2021	N/A	The program was also known as Talentadong Pinoy 2014 and Bangon Talentadong Pinoy.
16 years	N/A	24 Oras Weekend	GMA	February 21, 2010	present		
16 years	N/A	24 Oras Weekend	GMA News TV	March 21, 2020	February 7, 2021		
16 years	N/A	24 Oras Weekend	GTV	March 13, 2021	present		
16 years	N/A	24 Oras Weekend	Pinoy Hits	January 21, 2023	September 15, 2024		
16 years	N/A	Headstart with Karen Davila	ANC	March 1, 2010	present	N/A	Note: The program temporarily aired on DZMM TeleRadyo and S+A in 2020 prior to the COVID-19 pandemic in the Philippines.
16 years	4	Pepito Manaloto: Tuloy ang Kuwento	GMA	March 28, 2010	present	854 (as of October 10, 2026)	Previously known as Pepito Manaloto: Unang Kuwento, Pepito Manaloto: Ang Tunay na Kuwento, and Pepito Manaloto: Kuwento Kuwento.
16 years	4	Pepito Manaloto: Tuloy ang Kuwento	Pinoy Hits	January 21, 2023	September 14, 2024	854 (as of October 10, 2026)	Previously known as Pepito Manaloto: Unang Kuwento, Pepito Manaloto: Ang Tunay na Kuwento, and Pepito Manaloto: Kuwento Kuwento.
13 years	N/A	Extra Challenge	GMA	February 15, 1999	May 26, 2006	N/A	Philippine television news magazine and reality competition show. Formerly known as Extra Extra from 1999 to 2003. Note: The program did not air from 2006 to 2012.
13 years	N/A	Extra Challenge	GMA	October 27, 2012	January 20, 2013	N/A	Philippine television news magazine and reality competition show. Formerly known as Extra Extra from 1999 to 2003. Note: The program did not air from 2006 to 2012.
12 years	N/A	Hataw Balita	UNTV	September 26, 2005	2013	N/A	Note: The program did not air from 2013 to 2016. Later relaunched in 2025 as Hataw Balita Ngayon.
12 years	N/A	Hataw Balita	UNTV	June 13, 2016	October 13, 2017	N/A	Note: The program did not air from 2013 to 2016. Later relaunched in 2025 as Hataw Balita Ngayon.
12 years	N/A	Chika Chika Chicks	IBC	1979	February 25, 1987	N/A	Previously known as Chicks to Chicks.
12 years	N/A	Chika Chika Chicks	ABS-CBN	March 4, 1987	1991	N/A	Previously known as Chicks to Chicks.
12 years	N/A	BBC/City2 Balita	BBC/City2	November 5, 1973	September 5, 1986	N/A	Longest-running primetime newscast.
12 years	N/A	BBC/City2 Balita Late-Night Edition	BBC/City2	November 5, 1973	September 5, 1986	N/A	Longest-running late-night newscast.
12 years	N/A	Mid-day Report	IBC	February 3, 1975	February 27, 1987	N/A	1st Longest-running noontime newscast.
12 years	N/A	This Week Tonight	RPN	1977	1989	N/A	
12 years	N/A	Oh No! It's Johnny!	ABS-CBN	October 7, 1987	August 15, 1999	N/A	
12 years	N/A	Balitang Balita	ABC	February 24, 1992	April 7, 2004	N/A	Longest-running primetime news program.
12 years	N/A	Live on 5	ABC	February 24, 1992	April 11, 2004	N/A	Longest-running hourly news program.
12 years	N/A	Magandang Umaga, Pilipinas	ABS-CBN	June 5, 1995	June 22, 2007	N/A	Previously known as Alas Singko Y Medya and Magandang Umaga, Bayan.
12 years	N/A	Pamahaw Espesyal	ABS-CBN Cagayan de Oro	April 7, 2008	August 28, 2020	N/A	
12 years	N/A	Family Theater	ABS-CBN	1960	September 17, 1972		
12 years	N/A	Ang Pangarap Kong Jackpot	RPN	1995	2007	N/A	
12 years	N/A	News Central	Studio 23	September 14, 1998	October 1, 2010		
12 years	N/A	The Correspondents	ABS-CBN	November 10, 1998	October 19, 2010	622	Longest-running investigative documentary show in the Philippines.
12 years	N/A	News Patrol Kapampangan	ABS-CBN Pampanga	October 23, 2006	June 29, 2018	N/A	Previously known as TV Patrol Pampanga.
12 years	N/A	News Patrol Kapampangan	ABS-CBN Pampanga	July 2, 2018	May 17, 2019	N/A	Previously known as TV Patrol Pampanga.
12 years	N/A	Marhay na Aga Kapamilya	ABS-CBN Naga	January 7, 2008	August 28, 2020	N/A	
13 years	N/A	Matanglawin	ABS-CBN	March 24, 2008	May 3, 2020	697	Note: Program was eventually cancelled due to the ABS-CBN franchise renewal controversy on May 3, 2020, but resumed after five months, coinciding with the launch of A2Z on October 10. In addition, the host (Kim Atienza) later moved to GMA Network on October 1, 2021, and currently hosted Dami Mong Alam, Kuya Kim! (formerly hosted Dapat Alam Mo! from 2021 to 2024).
13 years	N/A	Matanglawin	A2Z	October 10, 2020	August 21, 2021	697	Note: Program was eventually cancelled due to the ABS-CBN franchise renewal controversy on May 3, 2020, but resumed after five months, coinciding with the launch of A2Z on October 10. In addition, the host (Kim Atienza) later moved to GMA Network on October 1, 2021, and currently hosted Dami Mong Alam, Kuya Kim! (formerly hosted Dapat Alam Mo! from 2021 to 2024).
14 years	N/A	Aha!	GMA	April 4, 2010	February 16, 2025		
16 years	N/A	Face to Face	TV5	March 8, 2010	October 11, 2013		Note: The show did not air from 2013 to 2023.
16 years	N/A	Face to Face	TV5	May 1, 2023	present		Note: The show did not air from 2013 to 2023.
16 years	N/A	Face to Face	One PH	May 1, 2023	present		Note: The show did not air from 2013 to 2023.
16 years	N/A	Pinoy M.D.	GMA	June 12, 2010	present		
16 years	N/A	Kabayan	DZMM TeleRadyo	July 12, 2010	May 5, 2020		Teleradio version of the DZMM Radyo Patrol 630 (formerly DWPM Radyo 630 and the first era of DZMM Radyo Patrol 630) program.
16 years	N/A	Kabayan	DZMM TeleRadyo	May 30, 2025	present		Teleradio version of the DZMM Radyo Patrol 630 (formerly DWPM Radyo 630 and the first era of DZMM Radyo Patrol 630) program.
16 years	N/A	Kabayan	ABS-CBN	July 12, 2010	October 22, 2010		Teleradio version of the DZMM Radyo Patrol 630 (formerly DWPM Radyo 630 and the first era of DZMM Radyo Patrol 630) program.
16 years	N/A	Kabayan	ABS-CBN	March 18, 2020	May 1, 2020		Teleradio version of the DZMM Radyo Patrol 630 (formerly DWPM Radyo 630 and the first era of DZMM Radyo Patrol 630) program.
16 years	N/A	Kabayan	TeleRadyo	May 8, 2020	June 29, 2023		Teleradio version of the DZMM Radyo Patrol 630 (formerly DWPM Radyo 630 and the first era of DZMM Radyo Patrol 630) program.
16 years	N/A	Kabayan	Kapamilya Channel	June 15, 2020	June 29, 2023		Teleradio version of the DZMM Radyo Patrol 630 (formerly DWPM Radyo 630 and the first era of DZMM Radyo Patrol 630) program.
16 years	N/A	Kabayan	TeleRadyo Serbisyo	June 30, 2023	May 29, 2025		Teleradio version of the DZMM Radyo Patrol 630 (formerly DWPM Radyo 630 and the first era of DZMM Radyo Patrol 630) program.
16 years	N/A	Kabayan	PRTV Prime Media	May 27, 2024	present		Teleradio version of the DZMM Radyo Patrol 630 (formerly DWPM Radyo 630 and the first era of DZMM Radyo Patrol 630) program.
15 years	N/A	Wanted sa Radyo	AksyonTV	February 21, 2011	January 11, 2019		Teleradio version of the 92.3 Radyo5 True FM (later 105.9 True FM) program, spinoff series including Wanted, Wanted: Ang Serye and Idol in Action.
15 years	N/A	Wanted sa Radyo	One PH	February 18, 2019	present		Teleradio version of the 92.3 Radyo5 True FM (later 105.9 True FM) program, spinoff series including Wanted, Wanted: Ang Serye and Idol in Action.
15 years	N/A	Wanted sa Radyo	RPTV	February 1, 2024	present		Teleradio version of the 92.3 Radyo5 True FM (later 105.9 True FM) program, spinoff series including Wanted, Wanted: Ang Serye and Idol in Action.
15 years	N/A	Wanted sa Radyo	TV5	February 21, 2024	April 5, 2024		Teleradio version of the 92.3 Radyo5 True FM (later 105.9 True FM) program, spinoff series including Wanted, Wanted: Ang Serye and Idol in Action.
15 years	N/A	Wanted sa Radyo	True TV	May 1, 2024	August 14, 2026		Teleradio version of the 92.3 Radyo5 True FM (later 105.9 True FM) program, spinoff series including Wanted, Wanted: Ang Serye and Idol in Action.
15 years	N/A	Cristy FerMinute	AksyonTV	February 21, 2011	January 11, 2019		Teleradio version of the 92.3 Radyo5 True FM (later 105.9 True FM) program, a revival of the 1995–1999 ABS-CBN series.
15 years	N/A	Cristy FerMinute	One PH	February 18, 2019	present		Teleradio version of the 92.3 Radyo5 True FM (later 105.9 True FM) program, a revival of the 1995–1999 ABS-CBN series.
15 years	N/A	Cristy FerMinute	True TV	May 1, 2024	August 14, 2026		Teleradio version of the 92.3 Radyo5 True FM (later 105.9 True FM) program, a revival of the 1995–1999 ABS-CBN series.
15 years	N/A	State of the Nation	GMA News TV	February 28, 2011	February 19, 2021		Formerly known as State of the Nation with Jessica Soho.
15 years	N/A	State of the Nation	GTV	February 22, 2021	present		Formerly known as State of the Nation with Jessica Soho.
13 years	N/A	Seeing Stars With Joe Quirino	IBC	1973	1986		
13 years	N/A	Get It Straight with Daniel Razon	UNTV	July 5, 2010	September 15, 2023		
12 years	N/A	News Live	GMA News TV	February 28, 2011	February 21, 2021		Formerly known as News TV Live. Later replaced by GMA Integrated News Bulletin since 2023.
12 years	N/A	News Live	GTV	February 22, 2021	March 26, 2023		Formerly known as News TV Live. Later replaced by GMA Integrated News Bulletin since 2023.
13 years	N/A	Brigada	GMA News TV	February 28, 2011	February 20, 2021		A revival of the 1993–2001 GMA Network series Brigada Siete.
13 years	N/A	Brigada	GTV	February 27, 2021	March 16, 2024		A revival of the 1993–2001 GMA Network series Brigada Siete.
13 years	N/A	Brigada	Pinoy Hits	January 21, 2023	March 16, 2024		A revival of the 1993–2001 GMA Network series Brigada Siete.
13 years	N/A	Tribe	Net 25	March 25, 2006	August 3, 2019	685	
15 years	N/A	Good News Kasama si Vicky Morales	GMA News TV	March 6, 2011	February 15, 2021		
15 years	N/A	Good News Kasama si Vicky Morales	GTV	February 22, 2021	present		
15 years	N/A	Good News Kasama si Vicky Morales	Pinoy Hits	January 21, 2023	September 14, 2023		
12 years	N/A	Sharon	ABS-CBN	September 6, 1998	May 23, 2004	538	A continuation of the 1986–97 series The Sharon Cuneta Show. Note: The program did not air from 2004 to 2006.
12 years	N/A	Sharon	ABS-CBN	February 26, 2006	October 3, 2010	538	A continuation of the 1986–97 series The Sharon Cuneta Show. Note: The program did not air from 2004 to 2006.
11 years	N/A	GoBingo	GMA	December 9, 1996	January 1, 1999	130	Note: The show did not air from 1999 to 2008.
11 years	N/A	GoBingo	GMA	April 14, 2008	October 10, 2008	130	Note: The show did not air from 1999 to 2008.
12 years	N/A	Biyahe ni Drew	GMA News TV	February 1, 2013	February 19, 2021	N/A	
12 years	N/A	Biyahe ni Drew	GTV	February 26, 2021	present	N/A	
12 years	N/A	Biyahe ni Drew	GMA	August 3, 2024	September 14, 2024	N/A	
13 years	N/A	My Puhunan: Kaya Mo!	ABS-CBN	July 17, 2013	February 4, 2015	300+	Originally known as My Puhunan (July 17, 2013 – February 4, 2015; July 7, 2015 – May 2, 2020). Note: The program was temporarily cancelled on ABS-CBN due to the ABS-CBN franchise renewal controversy on May 2, 2020. It resumed broadcast on Kapamilya Channel and A2Z on July 16, 2023. The program did not air from February to June 2015 and again from 2020 to 2023.
13 years	N/A	My Puhunan: Kaya Mo!	ABS-CBN	July 7, 2015	May 2, 2020	300+	Originally known as My Puhunan (July 17, 2013 – February 4, 2015; July 7, 2015 – May 2, 2020). Note: The program was temporarily cancelled on ABS-CBN due to the ABS-CBN franchise renewal controversy on May 2, 2020. It resumed broadcast on Kapamilya Channel and A2Z on July 16, 2023. The program did not air from February to June 2015 and again from 2020 to 2023.
13 years	N/A	My Puhunan: Kaya Mo!	Kapamilya Channel	July 16, 2023	present	300+	Originally known as My Puhunan (July 17, 2013 – February 4, 2015; July 7, 2015 – May 2, 2020). Note: The program was temporarily cancelled on ABS-CBN due to the ABS-CBN franchise renewal controversy on May 2, 2020. It resumed broadcast on Kapamilya Channel and A2Z on July 16, 2023. The program did not air from February to June 2015 and again from 2020 to 2023.
13 years	N/A	My Puhunan: Kaya Mo!	A2Z	July 16, 2023	present	300+	Originally known as My Puhunan (July 17, 2013 – February 4, 2015; July 7, 2015 – May 2, 2020). Note: The program was temporarily cancelled on ABS-CBN due to the ABS-CBN franchise renewal controversy on May 2, 2020. It resumed broadcast on Kapamilya Channel and A2Z on July 16, 2023. The program did not air from February to June 2015 and again from 2020 to 2023.
13 years	N/A	My Puhunan: Kaya Mo!	All TV	January 4, 2026	present	300+	Originally known as My Puhunan (July 17, 2013 – February 4, 2015; July 7, 2015 – May 2, 2020). Note: The program was temporarily cancelled on ABS-CBN due to the ABS-CBN franchise renewal controversy on May 2, 2020. It resumed broadcast on Kapamilya Channel and A2Z on July 16, 2023. The program did not air from February to June 2015 and again from 2020 to 2023.
11 years	N/A	Newsday	IBC	February 3, 1975	July 11, 1986	N/A	
11 years	N/A	Pangunahing Balita Ala-Una	PTV	April 7, 1986	July 31, 1998	N/A	
11 years	N/A	Palibhasa Lalake	ABS-CBN	March 3, 1987	November 9, 1998	N/A	2nd longest-running sitcom television series.
11 years	N/A	News Bites	Studio 23	1999	2010	N/A	
11 years	N/A	Sarap, 'Di Ba?	GMA	October 6, 2012	September 28, 2024	N/A	Formerly known as Sarap Diva with Regine Velasquez-Alcasid from 2012 to 2018. The former host (Velasquez-Alcasid) later moved to ABS-CBN.
11 years	N/A	GMA Balita	GMA	May 19, 1986	April 8, 1998	N/A	1st longest-running Filipino language evening newscast of GMA Network.
11 years	N/A	The Rafael Yabut Show	RBS	1961	1972	N/A	
11 years	N/A	Banana Sundae	ABS-CBN	October 11, 2008	April 5, 2020	N/A	Note: The program was eventually cancelled on ABS-CBN due to the ABS-CBN franchise renewal controversy on April 5, 2020.
15 years	N/A	Mata ng Agila	Net 25	October 24, 2011	present	N/A	The flagship newscast of Net 25, also heard on DZEC Radyo Agila 1062. Note: This show produced multiple editions, which include: Mata ng Agila sa Tanghali (2023); Mata ng Agila Weekend (2012); Mata ng Agila World News (aka NET25 World News; 2024–2025); Mata ng Agila International (2022)
14 years	N/A	iBilib	GMA	January 29, 2012	present	710 (as of October 18, 2026)	
14 years	N/A	iBilib	Pinoy Hits	January 22, 2023	September 15, 2024	710 (as of October 18, 2026)	
10 years	N/A	The News with Uncle Bob	RBS	October 30, 1961	September 22, 1972	N/A	
10 years	N/A	Spin-A-Win	RPN	1975	1985	N/A	
10 years	N/A	GMA News Digest	GMA	November 1, 1976	January 4, 1987	N/A	Longest-running hourly news program.
10 years	N/A	Suerte sa Siete	GMA	1976	1986	N/A	
10 years	N/A	Kahapon Lamang	GMA	1976	1986	N/A	
10 years	N/A	Viewpoint	GMA	August 21, 1984	November 1994	N/A	
10 years	N/A	That's Entertainment	GMA	January 6, 1986	May 3, 1996	3,200	
10 years	N/A	The Sharon Cuneta Show	IBC	September 14, 1986	February 28, 1988	562	
10 years	N/A	The Sharon Cuneta Show	ABS-CBN	March 6, 1988	June 15, 1997	562	
10 years	N/A	Okay Ka, Fairy Ko!	IBC	November 26, 1987	February 9, 1989	N/A	Longest-running fantasy situational comedy television series.
10 years	N/A	Okay Ka, Fairy Ko!	ABS-CBN	February 16, 1989	January 26, 1995	N/A	Longest-running fantasy situational comedy television series.
10 years	N/A	Okay Ka, Fairy Ko!	GMA	March 16, 1995	April 3, 1997	N/A	Longest-running fantasy situational comedy television series.
10 years	N/A	Martin After Dark	GMA	July 30, 1988	October 1993	N/A	
10 years	N/A	Martin After Dark	ABS-CBN	October 1993	November 28, 1998	N/A	
10 years	N/A	Business Class	RPN	1991	2001	N/A	
10 years	N/A	GMA Network News	GMA	January 6, 1992	July 14, 2002	N/A	Originally as an English language newscast from 1992 until 1999, the show was the longest-running late night evening newscast and the longest-running late night evening newscast of GMA Network.
10 years	N/A	5 and Up	ABC	May 16, 1992	1994	N/A	
10 years	N/A	5 and Up	GMA	1994	July 14, 2002	N/A	
10 years	N/A	Home Along Da Riles	ABS-CBN	December 23, 1992	August 10, 2003	531	3rd longest-running sitcom television series, including spin-off series Home Along Da Airport
19 years	N/A	Sine'skwela	ABS-CBN	June 13, 1994	2009	N/A	Longest-running children's educational series
10 years	N/A	Alagang Kapatid	TV5	September 11, 2010	August 5, 2012		Note: The show did not air from 2012 to 2015.
10 years	N/A	Alagang Kapatid	TV5	November 8, 2015	October 17, 2020		Note: The show did not air from 2012 to 2015.
10 years	N/A	Teledyaryo	NBN/PTV	July 16, 2001	June 29, 2012	N/A	Longest flagship newscast produced by NBN/PTV. Note: This show produced multiple editions, which includes: Teledyaryo 4:30pm (2004–2006); Teledyaryo 5:00pm (2006–2008); Teledyaryo Ala-Una (2001–2004); Teledyaryo Alas-Dose (2007–2008); Teledyaryo Alas-Nuwebe (2005–2008); Teledyaryo Alas-Tres (2006–2008); Teledyaryo Business (2006–2008, 2010–2012); Teledyaryo Final Edition (2005–2008, 2010–2012); Teledyaryo Linggo (2005–2007); Teledyaryo News Bulletin (2010–2012); Teledyaryo ng Bayan (2005–2007); Teledyaryo Panlalawigan (2005–2008); Teledyaryo Primetime (2005–2008); Teledyaryo Sabado (2005–2007); Teledyaryo Sports (2006–2008, 2010–2012); Teledyaryo Weekend (2009–2012)
10 years	N/A	Dong Puno Live	ABS-CBN	February 2, 1995	April 5, 2000	N/A	Note: The show did not air from 2000 to 2003.
10 years	N/A	Dong Puno Live	ABS-CBN	August 28, 2003	June 29, 2005	N/A	Note: The show did not air from 2000 to 2003.
10 years	N/A	Serbisyo Publiko	UNTV	September 11, 2004	2014	N/A	
10 years	N/A	Mornings @ ANC	ANC	July 3, 2006	February 24, 2017	N/A	
10 years	N/A	Kapamilya, Mas Winner Ka!	ABS-CBN Cebu, ABS-CBN Bacolod and ABS-CBN Davao	October 27, 2007	June 30, 2018	547	Previously known as Kapamilya Winner Ka!
10 years	N/A	Mag TV Na	ABS-CBN (only aired on all regional stations)	April 6, 2008	June 24, 2018	N/A	
10 years	N/A	Failon Ngayon	ABS-CBN	October 24, 2009	May 2, 2020	555	Note: The show has a radio version on DZMM/DZMM TeleRadyo from 2011 to 2020, hosted by Ted Failon and various hosts (later co-hosted by Czarina "DJ Chacha" Guevara). The TV show was suspended and later canceled due to the ABS-CBN franchise renewal controversy on May 5, 2020, but the radio version of the show continued until August 28, 2020. Failon and Guevara were also retrenched by ABS-CBN and moved to TV5, and currently hosted Ted Failon at DJ Chacha (sa Radyo5/True FM) since October 2020.
10 years	N/A	The Bottomline with Boy Abunda	ABS-CBN	November 28, 2009	May 2, 2020	522	
10 years	N/A	Balitanghali Weekend	Q	February 6, 2010	February 20, 2011	N/A	4th Longest-running noontime newscast.
10 years	N/A	Balitanghali Weekend	GMA News TV	March 5, 2011	March 15, 2020	N/A	4th Longest-running noontime newscast.
10 years	N/A	Tonight with Arnold Clavio	Q	April 5, 2010	February 18, 2011		
10 years	N/A	Tonight with Arnold Clavio	GMA News TV	February 28, 2011	March 11, 2020		
10 years	N/A	Front Row	GMA News TV	March 5, 2011	February 8, 2014		
10 years	N/A	Front Row	GMA News TV	July 20, 2020	December 28, 2020		
10 years	N/A	Front Row	GMA	February 10, 2014	July 13, 2020		
10 years	N/A	Front Row	GMA	January 4, 2021	March 8, 2021		
10 years	N/A	Pop Talk	GMA News TV	March 1, 2011	February 20, 2021		
10 years	N/A	Pop Talk	GTV	February 27, 2021	October 5, 2021		
12 years	N/A	Modern Living TV	ANC	July 19, 2014	present	N/A	
12 years	6	The Voice Kids	ABS-CBN	May 24, 2014	November 3, 2019	N/A	
12 years	6	The Voice Kids	Kapamilya Channel	February 25, 2023	May 21, 2023	N/A	
12 years	6	The Voice Kids	GMA	September 15, 2024	present	N/A	
11 years	44	Iskoolmates	PTV	June 23, 2015	present	325	
11 years	N/A	Market Edge	ANC	October 26, 2015	present	N/A	
10 years	N/A	Magandang Buhay	ABS-CBN	April 18, 2016	May 5, 2020	2,900	Note: Program was suspended due to the ABS-CBN franchise renewal controversy on May 5, 2020, but it was resumed after a month on June 15.
10 years	N/A	Magandang Buhay	Kapamilya Channel	June 15, 2020	June 26, 2026	2,900	Note: Program was suspended due to the ABS-CBN franchise renewal controversy on May 5, 2020, but it was resumed after a month on June 15.
10 years	N/A	Magandang Buhay	A2Z	October 19, 2020	June 26, 2026	2,900	Note: Program was suspended due to the ABS-CBN franchise renewal controversy on May 5, 2020, but it was resumed after a month on June 15.
10 years	N/A	Magandang Buhay	TV5	February 6, 2023	March 1, 2024	2,900	Note: Program was suspended due to the ABS-CBN franchise renewal controversy on May 5, 2020, but it was resumed after a month on June 15.
10 years	N/A	Magandang Buhay	All TV	May 13, 2024	June 26, 2026	2,900	Note: Program was suspended due to the ABS-CBN franchise renewal controversy on May 5, 2020, but it was resumed after a month on June 15.
10 years	N/A	Magandang Buhay	Jeepney TV	May 13, 2024	June 26, 2026	2,900	Note: Program was suspended due to the ABS-CBN franchise renewal controversy on May 5, 2020, but it was resumed after a month on June 15.
10 years	N/A	SMNI Newsline Philippines	SMNI/SMNI News Channel	June 5, 2006	December 30, 2016	2,749	
10 years	N/A	Tunay na Buhay	GMA	January 21, 2011	July 15, 2020	N/A	
10 years	N/A	Tunay na Buhay	GMA	January 6, 2021	October 13, 2021	N/A	
10 years	N/A	Tunay na Buhay	GMA News TV	July 22, 2020	December 30, 2020	N/A	
10 years	N/A	Tunay na Buhay	GTV	October 27, 2021	January 12, 2022	N/A	
10 years	N/A	Ano Ang Balita	MBC	April 16, 1962	September 22, 1972	N/A	Longest-running primetime newscast.

== See also ==
- Lists of longest-running U.S. shows by broadcast type:
  - List of longest-running United States television series
  - List of longest-running U.S. cable television series
  - List of longest-running U.S. broadcast network television series
  - List of longest-running U.S. primetime television series
  - List of longest-running U.S. first-run syndicated television series
- Lists of longest-running shows internationally:
  - List of longest-running television shows by category - international list
  - List of longest-running Indian television series
  - List of longest-running UK television series
  - List of longest-running Australian television series
  - List of longest-running Spanish television series
