= Newsline =

Newsline or News Line may refer to:

- Newsline (magazine), a Pakistani monthly news magazine 1989–2019
- The News Line, a British Trotskyist daily newspaper 1976–present
- BBC Newsline, a television newscast produced by BBC Northern Ireland 1996–present
- NHK Newsline, a Japanese foreign news programme 2000–present
- SMNI Newsline Philippines, a daily newscast 2006–2016
