= Newsline World =

Philippine television series

- Created by: SMNI News Channel
- Developed by: Sonshine Media Network International
- Starring: Troy Gomez and various contributors
- Country of origin: Philippines
- Original language: English
- No. of episodes: n/a (airs Monday to Friday)

Production
- Production locations: ACQ Tower, Makati, Philippines
- Running time: 65 minutes

Original release
- Network: SMNI News Channel
- Release: June 6, 2011 – present

Newsline World is the flagship English weeknight newscast of SMNI News Channel (SMNI) aired every weeknights at 11:00 p.m. to 12:00 a.m. (PST) on Sonshine Media Network International and SMNI's television stations throughout the Philippines. The newscast is anchored by Jean Domingo.

In February 2016, Newsline World was reformatted and moved in a new studio located at the ACQ Tower in EDSA, Guadalupe, Makati, in time for the national elections.

== See also ==
- SMNI News Channel
