= SMNI News Channel =

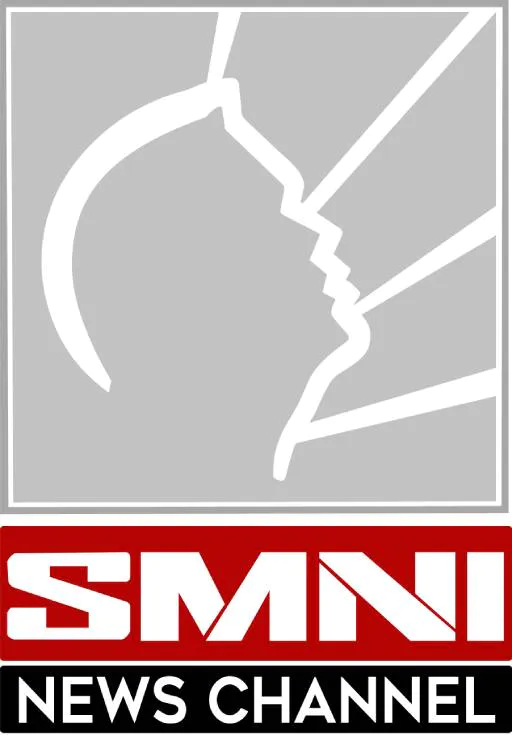
- Logo used since 2016
- Type: Broadcast digital free-to-air television network (formerly)
- Country: Philippines
- Headquarters: ACQ Tower, Santa Rita Street, cor. EDSA, Brgy. Guadalupe Nuevo, Makati, Metro Manila, Philippines; KJC Compound, Pan-Philippine Highway, Sasa, Brgy. Buhangin, Davao City, Metro Davao, Philippines

Programming
- Languages: Filipino (main); English (secondary)
- Picture format: 1080i (HDTV) (downscaled to 16:9 480i for the SDTV feed)

Ownership
- Owner: Swara Sug Media Corporation
- Key people: Marlon Rosete (President and CEO); Ludevija Ayang (Executive Producer)
- Sister channels: SMNI

History
- Launched: May 24, 2016; 10 years ago
- Founder: Apollo Quiboloy (Honorary Chairman)
- Closed: December 19, 2023; 2 years ago (digital TV only, NTC ordered suspension)

Links
- Website: smninewschannel.com

Availability

Terrestrial
- SkyCable Metro Manila: Channel 162
- Sky Direct Nationwide: Channel 24
- G Sat Nationwide: Channel 9

Streaming media
- Rumble: Watch Live (select programs only)

SMNI News Channel (SNC), known on-air as SMNI News, is a Philippine right wing militarist religious news and public service television network based in Makati. It is owned and operated by Swara Sug Media Corporation, the parent company of Sonshine Media Network International, a broadcasting arm of the Kingdom of Jesus Christ (KJC) led by Filipino televangelist and religious leader, Apollo Quiboloy.

It airs national and international newscasts and talk shows, rolling news coverage from correspondents and reporters of SMNI Manila and other news bureaus in the Philippines and in more than 40 countries around the world, entertainment programs and news-related programs.

It is currently aired by 600 cable and satellite television affiliates nationwide. Selected programs are simulcast live via Facebook. Prior to the NTC suspension of SMNI's free-to-air operations in 2023, it was exclusively aired on digital terrestrial television on UHF Channels 39 and 43 in Metro Manila, and UHF Channel 19 in Davao Central.

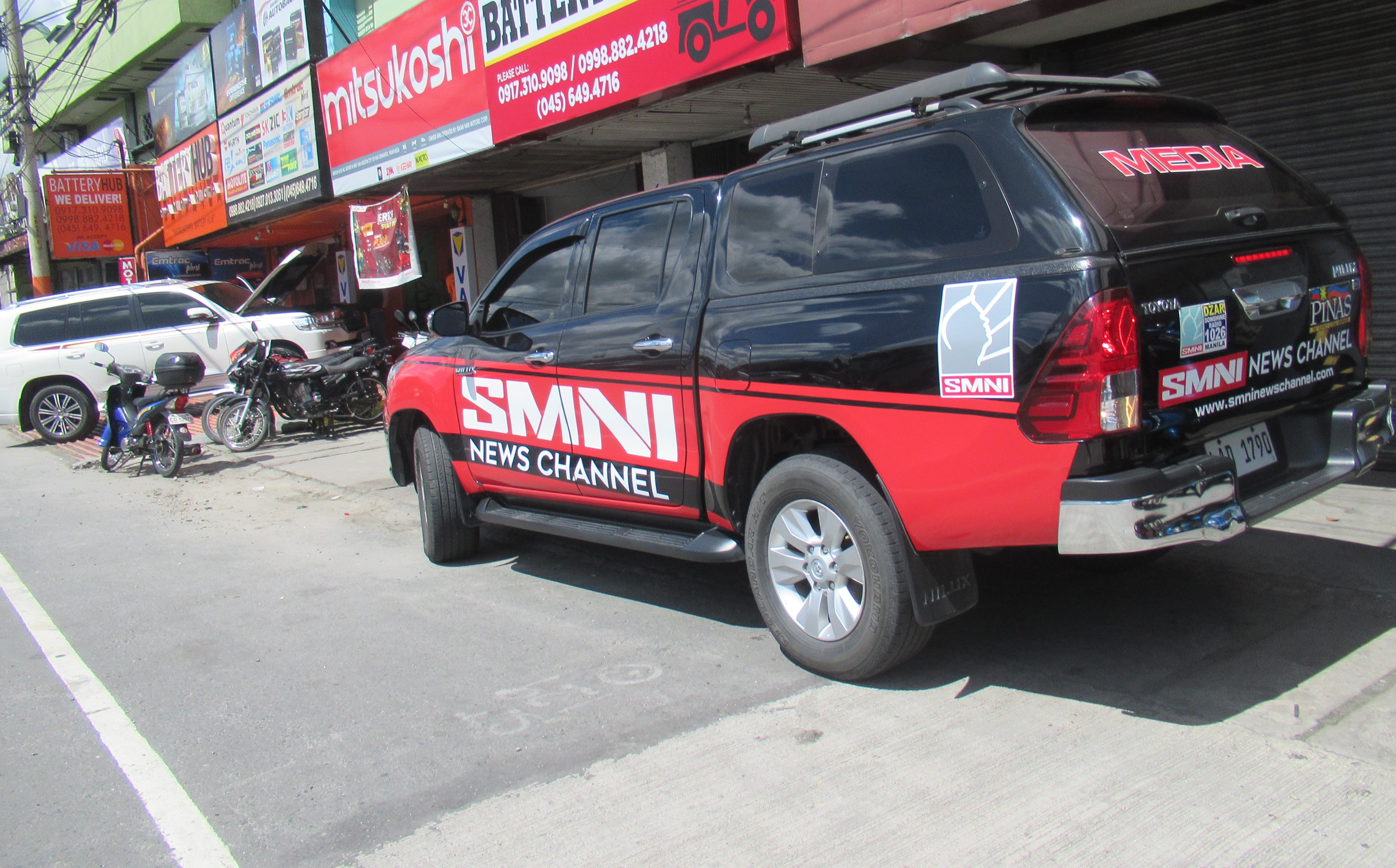
SMNI News Channel broadcasting van

== Programming ==
=== Current programs ===
==== News ====
- SMNI Newsblast (2016)
- SMNI Newsbreak
- SMNI Nightline News (2021)
- Newsline World

==== Public affairs and commentary ====
- Pinoy Legal Minds (2022)
- Pulso ng Bayan (2022)
- SMNI Special Reports
- The Deep Probe (2023)
- Banateros (2024)

==== Public service ====
- Problema N'yo Itawag kay Panelo (2022)
- SMNI Exclusive (2022)

==== Infotainment ====
- Ito ang Buhay (This is Life)
- Pa-Talk (2022)

==== Kingdom-related ====
- ACQ Classic
- Give Us This Day
- Powerline
- Quiet Moments
- Sounds of Worship
- Gospel of the Kingdom
- SPOTLIGHT Live! Worldwide

==== Documentary ====
- A New Me Story of Hope and Victory
- Caravan of Love

=== Previous programs ===
==== News ====
- Balita ng Bansa (2020–25)
- SMNI Newsline Philippines (2006–16)
- SMNI Morning Headlines
- SMNI Newsline
- Weekender World

=== Current affairs and commentary ===
- EdiTOLrial with Sen. Francis Tolentino
- Usaping Bayan (2016–22)
- Thinking Pinoy on SMNI (2020–21)
- Laban Kasama Ang Bayan (2021-23)
- Dito sa Bayan ni Juan (2015-23)
- Statecraft with Sass Rogando-Sasot (2021-23)
- Point of Order (2021–22)
- Maki-Alam (2022-24)
- Build PH (2023)
- OFW Helpline (2023)
- Business and Politics with Dante "Klink" Ang II (2022-23)
- 3PM: Luzon, Visayas, Mindanao Pilipinas Muna! (2023)
- Gikan sa Masa Para sa Masa (2023)

==== Infotainment ====
- Amplify Your Life
- Eco Hour
- Healthy Chat @ Sonshine
- Mga Doktor ng Bayan (2022–24)
- SMNI Entrepinoy Revolution (2022-23)

==== Public Service ====
- Kabayan Abroad (2020–23)
- OFW, Ikaw ang Bida! (2023)

==== Cartoon ====
- Kingdom Force (2022–23, later moved to ALLTV)

==== Drama ====
- Makitang Muli (Tagalog dub of 2011 Chinese drama Family Reunion; produced by Regent Foods Corporation, 2023)
- Papa, Nasa'n Ka? (2023) (Tagalog dub of 2011 Chinese drama Horizon True Heart; produced by Regent Foods Corporation, 2023)

==== Kingdom-related ====
- Generation K

==== Specials ====
- Election Watch 2016: The SMNI News Special Coverage
- SMNI Presidential Debates 2022
- SMNI Senatorial Debates 2022
- On the Road with the Frontrunner (multi-platform coverage of UniTeam campaign rallies)
- The Deep Probe: The SMNI Presidential Candidates Interview
- Election Watch 2019: The SMNI News Special Coverage
- Election Watch 2022: The SMNI News Special Coverage
- State of the Nation Address (2016-present)

== Subchannels ==
Subchannels of SMNI News Channel (UHF channel 39)
Channel	Video	Aspect	Short name	Programming	Note
39.01	480i	16:9	SMNI News Channel	SMNI News Channel	OFFLINE
39.02	480i	16:9/4:3	SMNI	SMNI	OFFLINE
39.03	480i	16:9	SMNI Radio	DZAR	OFFLINE

== Notable broadcasters and anchors ==
=== Current anchors ===
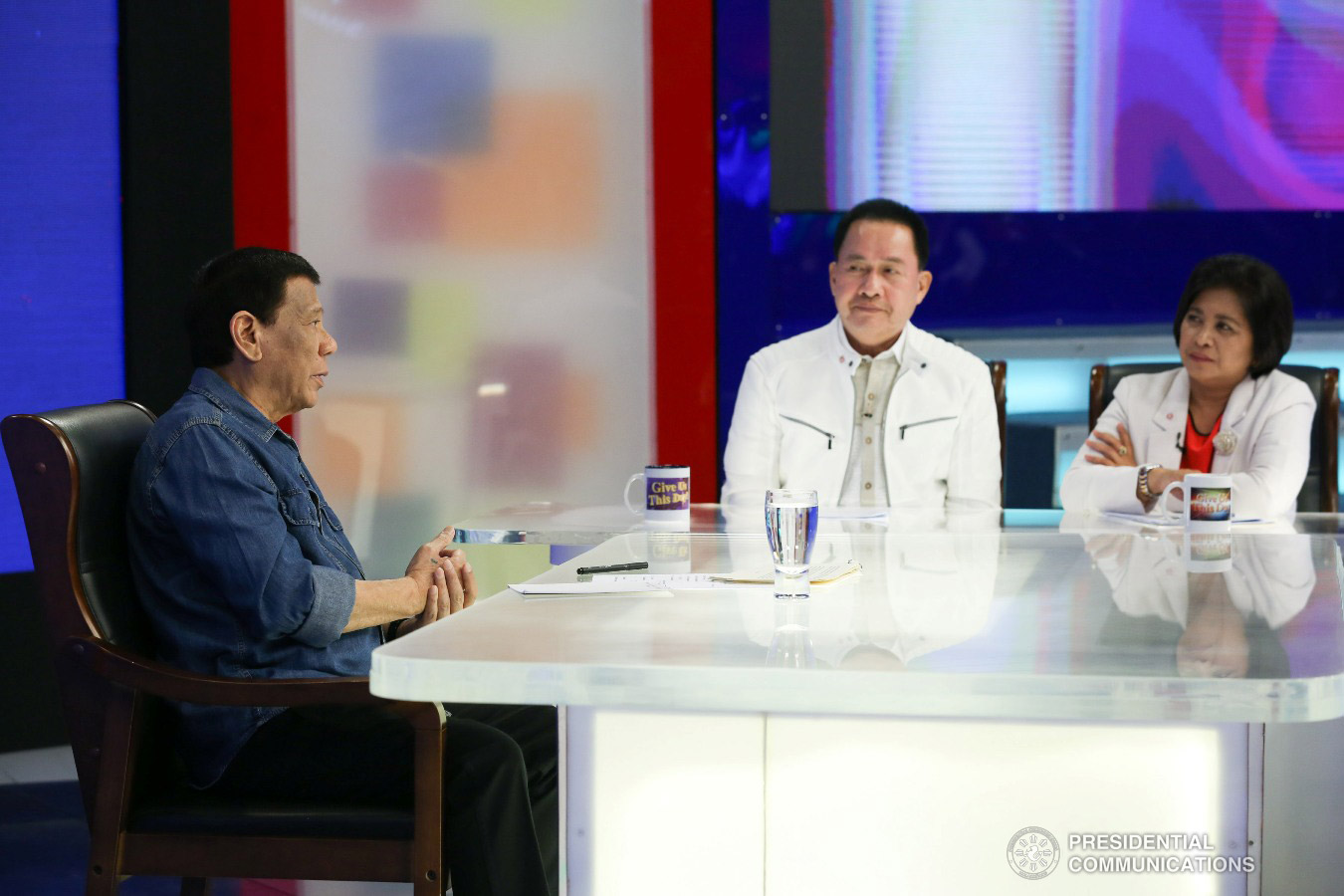
Quiboloy (center) with his guest President Rodrigo Duterte discuss matters during the show "Give Us This Day" in June 2019.

- Apollo Quiboloy
- Rodrigo Duterte
- Dante "Klink" Ang II
- Lorraine Badoy
- Juan Ponce Enrile
- Jesus "Mang Jess" Arranza
- Jeffrey "Ka Eric" Celis
- Sass Rogando Sasot
- Franco Baranda
- Yna Mortel
- MJ Mondejar
- Admar Vilando
- Dr. Carl Balita
- Troy Gomez
- Jade Calabroso
- Kyle Selva
- Salvador Panelo
- Ron Salo
- Harry Roque
- Atty. Mark Tolentino
- Dr. Ted Herbosa
- Greco Belgica
- Senator Francis Tolentino
- Marissa del Mar-Magsino
- Peter Serrano
- Lala Vinzon

=== Former anchors ===
- Miguel "Mike" Abe
- Mike Defensor
- Rodante Marcoleta
- R. J. Nieto
- Antonio Parlade Jr.
- Lucy Torres-Gomez
- Robert Ace Barbers
- Atty. David Castillon
- Atty. Migs Nograles
- Arnell Ignacio
- Anna Mae Lamentillo

== Awards and citations ==
In June 2023, SMNI was recognized as the "Best Preeminent Broadcasting and Media Production Company" (international category) in the 16th Golden Globe Annual Awards for Business and Excellence.

== Controversies ==
=== Far-right bias and red-tagging ===
According to a report by Rappler, the network allegedly fuels disinformation, misleading claims and propaganda to attack journalists and critics of the Duterte administration. It also has been accused of being a far-right channel in the Philippines. The channel has been compared to American Fox News and Canadian Rebel News.

On 7 July 2023, YouTube terminated the channels of SMNI and one of its programs, Laban Kasama ang Bayan (translated from Tagalog: Fight with the People), along with KJC, following a previous ban on Quiboloy's YouTube channel which was terminated on 21 June. Google later stated that their actions were in compliance with existing sanctions by the United States against Quiboloy pursuant to the US Global Magnitsky Act as well as allegations of red-tagging misinformation; Quiboloy was previously indicted by the United States Department of Justice on charges of human trafficking and child sexual abuse.

Quiboloy and SMNI later created accounts on the alt-tech video service Rumble as well as an alternate account for SMNI on YouTube in defiance of sanctions; the latter account was suspended by YouTube a few days later. On 15 September 2023, the SMNI News' Facebook page was deleted, in accordance to Meta's Dangerous Organizations and Individuals Policy. On 19 March 2025, Meta took down 3 Facebook pages affiliated with SMNI, including from DZAR 1026 citing "expressing hatred or contempt for a group of people and using harmful racial stereotypes" that violated Meta's community standards.

=== Administrative complaint ===
SMNI is facing an administrative complaint filed in May 2022 before the National Telecommunications Commission (NTC). Concepcion Empeño and Erlinda Cadapan, the mothers of disappeared students Karen Empeño and Sherlyn Cadapan, and left-wing human rights group Karapatan petitioned the NTC to revoke Swara Sug Media Corporation's franchise, for airing on SMNI an interview with convicted kidnapper and retired Army General Jovito Palparan. The complainants said in a statement that the broadcast propagated disinformation in violation of Republic Act No. 11422 and the 2007 Broadcast Code of the Philippines. Palparan and program host Lorraine Badoy also red-tagged former vice president and then-presidential candidate Leni Robredo during the broadcast, which the complainants alleged were in violation of Commission on Elections' Resolution No. 10730 involving truth in advertising and fair and accurate reporting.

=== Partnership talks with CGTN ===
During former President Rodrigo Duterte's meeting with General Secretary of the Chinese Communist Party Xi Jinping in July 2023, SMNI personnel, along with Quiboloy, met with Chinese state media China Global Television Network (CGTN) executives to discuss a partnership for efficient information dissemination.

=== House franchise probe ===
On 28 November 2023, the Philippine House Committee on Legislative Franchises launched an investigation on SMNI, following a report claimed by Laban Kasama ang Bayan co-host Jeffrey Celiz about travel expenses allocated to House Speaker Martin Romualdez where he spent ₱1.8 billion. Quezon 2nd District Representative David Suarez called the report "fake news". The Kapisanan ng mga Brodkaster ng Pilipinas (KBP) also flagged SMNI, Celiz and co-host Lorraine Badoy for violating its Code of Ethics even when they were unaccredited broadcasters.

SMNI faced legal scrutiny following the investigation, including the revocation of its congressional franchise. PBA Partylist Representative Margarita Nograles filed a resolution urging the National Telecommunications Commission (NTC) to suspend the broadcast operations of SMNI for allegedly violating its franchise's terms and conditions.

=== Suspension of programs and operations ===
Two programs were placed under a 14-day preventive suspension by the Movie and Television Review and Classification Board, effective 18 December 2023, following reported complaints on their alleged violations. Majority of board members voted to suspend Gikan sa Masa, para sa Masa, where program host, former president Rodrigo Duterte, allegedly twice aired threats against ACT Teachers party-list representative France Castro.

The program Laban Kasama ng Bayan was unanimously suspended after an episode where one of the hosts, Jeffrey "Ka Eric" Celiz, questioned the travel spending of House Speaker Martin Romualdez in that year, citing unverified information from his source at the Senate. The House had Celiz cited in contempt for refusing to reveal his source on his inquiry; Celiz said he is bound by the Sotto Law, which protects journalists from revealing their sources. Celiz was eventually detained for seven days together with his fellow host, Lorraine Badoy, who was also cited in contempt. Celiz and Badoy went on a hunger strike in response to the "travesty" of the House proceedings and their detention. On 11 December, Celiz' wife and Badoy's husband, represented by lawyer and fellow SMNI host Harry Roque, filed a petition before the Supreme Court to release the two news hosts on or before 15 December; the petition also asked the court to issue a writ of habeas corpus declaring their detention had no legal basis and to issue a writ declaring that the House acted with grave abuse of discretion. Four days later, the House released Celiz and Badoy from detention citing "humanitarian reasons dahil Kapaskuhan (because it is Christmas)".

On 21 December, the National Telecommunications Commission issued an order suspending operations of the entire SMNI for 30 days, as well as a show cause order against the network. On 22 January 2024, the NTC, per Deputy Commissioners John Paulo Salvahan and Alvin Bernardo Blanco, in a 6-page Cease and Desist Order, made the 30-day SMNI suspension indefinite: “Pursuant to Sec. 4, Rule 10, the 2006 Rules of Practice and Procedure… the Commission hereby directs respondent to cease and desist from operating its radio and television stations under the authorities enumerated in the 19 December 2023 show-cause-order (with 30-day suspension order pending hearing and final consideration of the above-captioned case).” The Order was signed after the House of Representatives said in Resolution 189 that "the SMNI violated several provisions of its franchise as provided under Republic Act 11422".
