= Newsblast =

- Also known as: SMNI Newsblast
- Created by: Sonshine Media Network International
- Developed by: SMNI News and Public Affairs
- Starring: Various contributors
- Country of origin: Philippines
- Original language: Tagalog
- No. of episodes: n/a (airs daily)

Production
- Running time: 60 minutes

Original release
- Network: Sonshine Media Network International; SMNI News Channel
- Release: May 24, 2016 – present

SMNI Newsblast is the flagship weekday newscast of Sonshine Media Network International and SMNI News Channel. It airs daily from 6:30 PM (Philippine Standard Time).

== History ==
Prior to its current name, it was then known as SMNI Newsline Philippines (Newsline Pilipinas) It aired from June 5, 2006 to December 30, 2016. The newscast airs every noontime Monday to Friday at 12:00 NN (PST).

In 2016, SMNI formally launched its own primetime newscast known as Newsblast, co-existing with Newsline Philippines until the end of 2016, when Newsblast becomes the network's official primetime newscast.

== Anchors ==
- Yna Mortel
- Troy Gomez
- Jade Calabroso
- Kyle Selva
- Carla Abellana (not to be confused with the actress of the same name)
- Franco Baranda
- Angel Pastor
- Jayne Codnita

=== Past ===
- Carlo Catiil
- Kathy Villanueva
- Rowel Villanueva
- Nancy Tan
- Jhomel Santos
- Vanessa Reyes
- Ruben Sumipo
- Reynald Tapel
- Gretchen Belleza
- Ryan Castillo
- Praya Tupan

== See also ==
- Sonshine Media Network International
