= DYYQ-TV =

Triple T
- Dumaguete; Sonion
- Channels: Analog: 22 (UHF)
- Branding: SMNI TV-22 Dumaguete

Ownership
- Owner: Sonshine Media Network International

History
- Founded: 2005
- Call sign meaning: DYYQ

Technical information
- ERP: 50,000 watts

Links
- Website: www.sonshinetv.com

DYYQ-TV Channel 22 of Sonshine Media Network International (SMNI) (otherwise known as SMNI TV-22) is a relay station of SMNI TV 43 Davao, operated from Davao City since the network expanded across the Philippines. The studios and transmitter are located in Brgy, Camanjac, Dumaguete, Negros Oriental.

== See also ==
- DWBP-TV
- Sonshine Media Network International
- DXAQ-TV
