= DWAC-TV =

- Metro Manila; Philippines
- City: Quezon City
- Channels: Analog: 23 (UHF); Digital: DWBM-TV 43 (UHF); Virtual: 1.2

Programming
- Affiliations: Slient (see Aliw Channel 23)

Ownership
- Owner: ABS-CBN Corporation; (AMCARA Broadcasting Network)
- Sister stations: DWWX-TV; DZMM Radyo Patrol 630 (now owned by PCMC as DWPM); DWRR-FM

History
- Founded: May 5, 1992; 34 years ago
- First air date: May 5, 1992; 34 years ago
- Last air date: May 5, 2020; 6 years ago (broadcast franchise lapsed/expired)
- Former call signs: DWST/DZEE-TV (1992-1996)
- Former affiliations: Independent (1992-1996); EEC-23 (1992-1996); MTV Asia (1992-1994, 1996-2000); Channel V (1994-1996); Myx (2000-2014); Studio 23 (1996-2014); S+A (2014-2020)

Technical information
- Licensing authority: NTC

DWAC-TV (channel 23) was a television station in Metro Manila, Philippines. It was owned and operated by the ABS-CBN Corporation through its licensee AMCARA Broadcasting Network alongside ABS-CBN flagship DWWX-TV (channel 2). Both stations, alongside radio flagships DZMM Radyo Patrol 630 (now owned by PCMC) and MOR 101.9 (now online MOR Entertainment). Both studio and hybrid analog and digital transmitting facilities were located at ABS-CBN Broadcasting Center, Mother Ignacia Avenue corner Sergeant Esguerra Avenue, Diliman, Quezon City.

== History ==
The station was acquired from Ermita Electronics Corporation in July 1996, which initially owned the frequency of the station that began airing in May 1992 from a densely populated commercial area in Quezon City with a rebroadcast of MTV Asia, then telecasting from the STAR TV platform. It was later showing Channel [V] refeeds from 1994 onwards as MTV made the decision to split from STAR and form its own satellite TV portal in Asia.

Just two years later in 1996, MTV Asia returned to the Philippine airwaves after establishing a new regional base in Singapore. ABS-CBN was picked as the broadcast arm of MTV Asia in the Philippines at the time, and Channel 23 started test broadcasts in September 1996 with rebroadcasts of the new MTV Asia from Singapore. A month later, it launched its own programming under the station name Studio 23 and adopted the slogan "Premium Television". It also became the first UHF TV station in Metro Manila to broadcast in full surround stereo, and the fourth television station in the country to broadcast in stereo (after GMA-7 in 1987, SBN 21 in 1992, and RPN-9 in 1994). The station initially ran MTV rebroadcasts in the day, and ran its own shows at primetime. It also ran for 24 hours, but later reneging to a 21-hour broadcast (from 6 am to 3 am), owing to financial limitations. That has been the broadcast arrangement ever since.

Five years later, MTV Asia acquired a new local UHF frequency, Channel 41 owned by Nation Broadcasting Corporation (which is now One Sports, now co-owned by TV5) and Studio 23 formally became a full-fledged station, adopting rebroadcasts of its in-house cable channel Myx to fill in the void left by MTV Asia, and came up with intensified programming led by the popular reality TV game show Survivor, and several top rate US shows like 7th Heaven, Will and Grace and Charmed, among others.

By 2004, the channel opened its doors to Taglish programs. It also by that time adopted a new slogan, "Kabarkada Mo!". Previous to this trend, the station was already running its own English newscast, News Central, from 1998 to 2010, effectively replacing the network's News 23. It also geared its mostly young viewers to trends in the tech world with Digital World. With the intensified Taglish presence, Studio 23 launched the nightly Tagalog gag newscast Wazzup Wazzup, the interactive youth talk show Y-Speak, and several others. It even provided support shows to its highly successful local reality programs Pinoy Big Brother and Pinoy Dream Academy, both acquired from Endemol of the Netherlands and are big hits on Channel 2.

=== Expansion to sports programming ===
In 1998, ABS-CBN, through its sports division, ABS-CBN Sports, used Studio 23 to highlight its own professional basketball league, the Metropolitan Basketball Association (MBA). The league adopted the home and away format used by the American professional league the National Basketball Association (NBA). (It however sold the franchise of the league after incurring heavy losses.) It marked the network's first serious foray into sports programming.

Later, that would be added by acquiring broadcast rights to the collegiate leagues UAAP and NCAA and the PBL.

It carried a wide variety of local sporting competitions, many of which involved neighborhood schools and showcasing budding Filipino sports talents.

=== Rebrand to ABS-CBN Sports+Action ===
Sports programming in Channel 23 was fully expanded with the launch of ABS-CBN Sports+Action on January 18, 2014, replacing Studio 23.

On August 29, 2016, in time with the National Heroes Day celebration, ABS-CBN Sports+Action was renamed as simply S+A (S and A).

=== Shutdown ===
On May 5, 2020, S+A Manila went off-air due to the cease and desist order from the National Telecommunications Commission (NTC) after its franchise expiration.

On January 5, 2022, its former UHF frequencies (channel 23 and 43) were assigned by NTC to RPN's sister company Aliw Broadcasting Corporation (for channel 23) and Swara Sug Media Corporation (for channel 43); the former began conducting test broadcast since May 6, 2022. The channel 43 was inactive since December 21, 2023, as SSMC stopped operating their TV and radio stations as per NTC's 30-day suspension order.

== Digital television ==
=== Digital channels ===
UHF Channel 43 (647.143 MHz)

Channel	Video	Aspect	Short name	Programming	Note
1.01	480i	4:3	ABS-CBN	ABS-CBN	Commercial broadcast
1.02	480i	4:3	SPORTS+ACTION	S+A	Commercial broadcast
1.03	480i	4:3	CINEMO!	Cine Mo!	Encrypted
1.04	480i	4:3	YEY!	Yey!	Encrypted
1.05	480i	4:3	DZMM Teleradyo	DZMM TeleRadyo	Encrypted
1.06	480i	4:3	KBO	Kapamilya Box Office	Pay per view
1.31	240p	4:3	ABS-CBN OneSeg	ABS-CBN	1seg broadcast

UHF Channel 16 (485.143 MHz) ^{1}

Channel	Video	Aspect	Short name	Programming	Note
2.01	480i	4:3	Knowledge Channel	Knowledge Channel	Test broadcast
2.02	480i	16:9	O SHOPPING	O Shopping	Test broadcast
2.03	480i	4:3	ASIANOVELA CHANNEL	Asianovela Channel	Encrypted (on free trial) ^{2}
2.04	480i	4:3	MOVIE CENTRAL	Movie Central	Encrypted (on free trial) ^{2}
2.05	480i	4:3	JEEPNEY TV	Jeepney TV	Encrypted (on free trial) ^{2}
2.06	480i	4:3	MYX	Myx	Encrypted (on free trial) ^{2}
2.31	240p	4:3	ASIANOVELA ONESEG	Asianovela Channel	1seg broadcast

Notes:

- CINEMO!, YEY! and DZMM Teleradyo are exclusive channels to TV Plus, a digital set-top box marketed by the network.
- Kapamilya Box Office or KBO Channel is accessible by texting activation on all networks. KBO consists of the films and catch-up marathons of TV shows.

== See also ==
- ABS-CBN (inactive as free-to-air TV network; active as a content provider)
- ABS-CBN Sports and Action (defunct)
- Studio 23 (the former name of ABS-CBN Sports and Action; defunct)
- Channel V Philippines (defunct)
- MTV Philippines (defunct)
- ABS-CBN Sports and Action stations
- Aliw Channel 23

Preceded by DZEE-TV (1992–1996)	DWAC-TV (1996–2020)	Succeeded by DWBA-DTV (2022-present)
