= DXAB-TV =

- Metro Davao; Philippines
- City: Davao City
- Channels: Analog: 21 (UHF); Digital: 35 (UHF) (ISDB-T)

Programming
- Affiliations: Silent

Ownership
- Owner: ABS-CBN Corporation; (AMCARA Broadcasting Network)
- Sister stations: DXAS-TV; DXAB-AM; DXRR-FM

History
- Founded: 1996
- Last air date: May 5, 2020 (broadcast franchise lapsed/expired)
- Former affiliations: Studio 23 (1996-2014)
- Call sign meaning: DX; ABS-CBN Corporation or Alto Broadcasting adopted from sister station DXAB-AM

DXAB-TV channel 21, was the regional relay station of DWAC-TV, a fully owned subsidiary of AMCARA Broadcasting Network. Its studio and transmitter are located at the ABS-CBN Broadcast Complex, Broadcast Ave., Shrine Hills, Matina, Davao City.

On May 5, 2020, S+A Davao went off-air, due to cease and desist order from the National Telecommunications Commission, together with ABS-CBN and MOR after its legislative franchise expired on May 4.

== See also ==
- ABS-CBN
- ABS-CBN Sports and Action
- DXAS-TV
- DXRR
- DXAB
- Studio 23 (defunct)
- ABS-CBN Sports and Action stations
