= News@12 =

Defunct news program

- Created by: Sonshine TV 43 Davao; GMA News and Public Affairs
- Developed by: Sonshine Media Network International
- Directed by: Catherina Fournier
- Starring: Troy Gomez
- Theme music composer: Dandy Dioneda; Romeo Bautista
- Country of origin: Philippines
- Original language: English
- No. of episodes: n/a (airs daily)

Production
- Executive producer: Ingrid Canada
- Production location: Davao City
- Running time: 15 minutes

Original release
- Network: ACQ-Kingdom Broadcasting Network
- Release: 2008

News@12 is the defunct daily newscast of the Sonshine Media Network International with the latest national, local & international news, business news & sports news and its anchored by Troy Gomez.

== Reporters ==
- Jade Cleaveland
- Rachelle Dueñas
- Jeremiah Pancho

== See also ==
- Sonshine Media Network International
