= Asenso Pinoy (TV program) =

Philippine television news magazine program

- Title card
- Also known as: Asenso Ka Pinoy
- Genre: Informative
- Created by: Radio Corporation of the Philippines
- Developed by: Spotlight Media Services, Inc.
- Directed by: Anna Galanga-Cardona
- Presented by: Francis Cardona
- Opening theme: Asenso Pinoy Jingle
- Ending theme: Asenso Pinoy Jingle
- Country of origin: Philippines
- Original language: Tagalog

Production
- Executive producer: Anna Galanga-Cardona

Original release
- Network: ABC
- Release: July 3, 2005 – August 2, 2008
- Network: IBC
- Release: 2006 – 2011
- Network: NBN/PTV
- Release: 2008 – 2014
- Network: Studio 23
- Release: 2013 – January 11, 2014
- Network: S+A
- Release: February 15, 2014 – March 15, 2020
- Network: A2Z
- Release: November 14, 2020 – January 7, 2023
- Network: PTV
- Release: December 2, 2023 – July 27, 2024

Asenso Ka Pinoy (formerly Asenso Pinoy) is a Philippine television infotainment show broadcast by ABC, IBC, NBN/PTV, Studio 23, S+A and A2Z. Hosted by Francis Cardona, it aired from July 3, 2005 to July 27, 2024.

The show focuses on providing livelihood information, highlighting technological advancements in agriculture and progressive entrepreneurship. It also incorporates features on travel and tourism, culture and the arts, as well as inspiring stories of micro-entrepreneurs.

== History ==
=== Early years ===
Asenso Pinoy was launched in 2004 as an agribusiness-livelihood radio program. Around the same time, a weekly column with the same name began publication in The Manila Times. Initially airing every Saturday morning, the radio program premiered on DWSS-AM before transferring to the state-run DZSR-AM Sports Radio in February 2005. The program aired on DZXL-AM and was simulcast across stations and affiliates of the Radyo Pilipino Media Group (RPMG; formerly Philradio) until 2024.

The project later expanded into a half-hour Sunday television magazine program under the same name, which premiered on July 3, 2005, at noon on ABC-5. Over a month later, the show moved to an early Saturday afternoon timeslot. The television program features segments on entrepreneurship, personal development, and related topics.

=== Francis Cardona ===
Both programs were produced and hosted by Francisco "Francis" L. Cardona (May 26, 1957 – April 28, 2024) In the programs' early years, he had been serving as the executive vice president and chief operating officer of the Philradio, which later became RPMG, a Tarlac-based provincial broadcast network where he eventually became its president.

Cardona's media career began in 1976 as a radio reporter. He also served in the Kapisanan ng mga Brodkaster ng Pilipinas as a long-time director, and later as the vice president for radio.

Cardona died from pneumonia at a hospital in Quezon City on April 28, 2024. Following his death, the program was reformatted without hosts until January 19, 2025, when Francis' wife, Anna Galanga-Cardona—who also served as the show's director and executive producer—took over as the main host.

== Host ==
- Anna Galanga-Cardona

Former host

- Francis Cardona (†)

== Production ==
In March 2020, production was halted due to the enhanced community quarantine in Luzon caused by the COVID-19 pandemic, as well as the shutdown of its broadcaster S+A due to expiration of ABS-CBN's broadcast franchise two months later.

The program resumed on November 14, 2020 and taped before the pandemic. It was aired on A2Z every Saturday mornings at 6:30 a.m. until January 7, 2023.

== Nominations ==
| Year | Award | Category | Recipient | Result | Ref. |
|---|---|---|---|---|---|
| 2011 | 25th PMPC Star Awards for Television | Best Travel Show | Asenso Pinoy (NBN-4) | Nominated | |
| 2011 | 25th PMPC Star Awards for Television | Best Travel Show Host | Francis Cardona (NBN-4) | Nominated | |
