= DXAQ =

DXAQ is the callsign used in Mindanao, Philippines. Here are the following:

- DXAQ-AM, a defunct AM radio station in Davao City
- DXAQ-FM, an FM radio station broadcasting in Dipolog, branded as Radyo Bisdak
- DXAQ-TV, a television station in Davao City, branded as SMNI TV-43 Davao
