= DZAR =

Radio station in Metro Manila, Philippines

Sonshine Radio Manila (DZAR)
- Makati; Philippines
- Broadcast area: Mega Manila and surrounding areas
- Frequency: 1026 kHz
- Branding: DZAR 1026 Sonshine Radio Manila

Programming
- Languages: Filipino, English
- Format: Silent
- Network: Sonshine Radio

Ownership
- Owner: Hypersonic Broadcasting Center (1973-1987); Nation Broadcasting Corporation (1987-2005); Swara Sug Media Corporation (2005-2023)
- Sister stations: DWAQ-DTV

History
- First air date: August 7, 1972; 54 years ago
- Last air date: December 21, 2023; 2 years ago (NTC suspension order)
- Former call signs: DZXX (1972-1975); DWXX (1975-1987); DZAM (1987-1998)
- Former names: DZXX (1972-1975); Double X (1975-1987); Radyo Commando (1987-1998); Angel Radyo (1998-2005); Sonshine Radio (2005-2023)
- Former frequencies: 1000 kHz (1973-1979)
- Call sign meaning: Angel Radyo (former branding under NBC); Alternatibong Radyo

Technical information
- Licensing authority: NTC
- Class: A1
- Power: 50,000 watts

Links
- Webcast: Listen/Watch via Facebook Live
- Website: http://www.dzar1026.ph/ http://www.smninewschannel.com

DZAR (1026 AM) Sonshine Radio was a radio station owned and operated by Swara Sug Media Corporation in the Philippines. The station's studio was located at the 3rd Floor, ACQ Tower (formerly Jacinta Building I/NBC Tower), Santa Rita St. cor. EDSA, Brgy. Guadalupe Nuevo, Makati City, Metro Manila and its transmitter was located along M. Sioson St., Brgy. Dampalit, Malabon City, Metro Manila.

== History ==
=== 1972–1987: DZXX/DWXX ===
The station was established on August 7, 1972, under the ownership of Republic Broadcasting System (now GMA Network). It carried the callsign DZXX when it was broadcasting on 1000 kHz. However, it closed shop by the time Martial Law was declared. On February 1, 1973, it went back on the air, this time under the ownership of Hypersonic Broadcasting Center. In 1975, it changed its callsign to DWXX (Double X) and switched to a news and music format. DWXX closed shop on April 15, 1987.

=== 1987–1998: DZAM Radyo Commando ===
On May 10, 1987, Nation Broadcasting Corporation took over the frequency under the callsign DZAM, later known as DZAM Radyo Commando. During that period, the station operated with 10 kW output, and it featured a uniform network-type full-service format (a.k.a. TV-on-radio format), consisting of news, and well-balanced mix of talk, music and entertainment programming for listeners of all ages; the live coverage of PBA games were also aired here during that time.

=== 1998–2005: DZAR Angel Radyo ===
In 1998, after NBC was acquired by PLDT's MediaQuest Holdings from the consortium led by the Yabut family and real estate magnate Manny Villar, DZAM later changed its callsign as DZAR and relaunched as Angel Radyo, with an upgraded 25 kW signal, followed by the switch to news and talkback format. Some of the personalities who worked for Angel Radyo were TV personalities Boy Abunda, Ricky Carandang, TG Kintanar, Gerry Geronimo, Angelique Lazo, Bernadette Sembrano, Gina dela Vega-Cruz, showbiz columnist Jobert Sucaldito, columnist Rina Jimenez-David, Fernan Emberga, Noli Eala and Tim Orbos.

=== 2005–2023: DZAR Sonshine Radio ===
On January 29, 2005, international televangelist pastor Apollo Quiboloy acquired all of NBC's AM stations under the Swara Sug Media Corporation's ownership. This, in turn, gave birth to Sonshine Radio. At that time its studios moved from NBC Tower/Jacinta Building in EDSA, Guadalupe, Makati to Jollibee Plaza Building in Ortigas Center, Pasig, and finally upgraded to its current 50 kW output, with its news, talk and religious programming. Tony Cuevas and Mhet Miñon were the only remaining members of the Angel Radyo roster to join the rebranded station.

Its 50,000-watt broadcast signal is heard in its territorial limits (Metro Manila). It is the only Philippine station listened to all over the world live via satellite through Globecast and through the Internet at its website, thus the tag "Dinig sa buong mundo" (Heard all over the world).

In 2012, DZAR studios moved back from Jollibee Plaza Building in Ortigas Center, Pasig to the new home ACQ Tower (formerly NBC Tower/Jacinta Building) in EDSA, Guadalupe, Makati City.

On November 21, 2022, the station successfully began test broadcast on digital terrestrial television via DWAQ-TV subchannel 39.03 in Metro Manila. It comes as the station went off the air on AM radio for a period of time to give way to the transfer of its transmitter to an undisclosed area for better coverage.

==== 2023: Suspension, cease and desist order and forced shutdown ====
On December 2, 2023, DZAR returned on air. However, the station, along with the rest of the network, had its operations suspended by the National Telecommunications Commission for 30 days, through an order dated December 19 but was publicized two days later, in response to a House of Representatives resolution, in relation to the alleged franchise violations. On January 18, 2024, the NTC issued a cease-and-desist order against SMNI for violating its 30-day suspension order as its TV and radio stations in Region VI were operational as of December 27, 2023. As 2024 however, the DZAR branding continues to exist on their own website and TikTok account. Meanwhile, their YouTube channel has not been accessed by administrators. Despite this, the station's programs continue to stream over Facebook page and YouTube channel.

On November 12, 2024, Facebook page MediaBytes reported that the National Telecommunication Commission recalled the radio frequencies given to SMNI, which includes 1026 kHz in Manila, but this was neither confirmed nor denied by both parties.

== Notable on-air personalities ==
=== DZAM Ating Maaasahan/Radyo Commando ===
- Matutina

=== DZAR Angel Radyo ===
- Boy Abunda
- Ricky Carandang
- Bernadette Sembrano
- Rina Jimenez-David
- Noli Eala
- Cesar Chavez

=== DZAR Sonshine Radio ===
- Apollo Quiboloy
- Rodrigo Duterte
- Jay Sonza
- Juan Ponce Enrile
- Aljo Bendijo
- Mike Defensor
- Lucy Torres-Gomez
- RJ Nieto
- Ted Herbosa
- Migs Nograles
- Greco Belgica
- Lorraine Badoy
- Harry Roque
- Arnell Ignacio
- Dante "Klink" Ang
- Ferdinand Topacio
