= DXAB =

DXAB may refer to one of the following defunct ABS-CBN-owned broadcasters in Davao City, Philippines:

- DXAB-AM, a radio station (1296 AM), broadcasting as DXAB Radyo Patrol 1296
- DXAB-TV, a television station (channel 21), broadcasting as S+A 21 Davao
