= DXCL =

DXCL may refer to the Philippine radio stations:

- DXCL-AM, an AM radio station broadcasting in Cagayan de Oro, Philippines
- DXCL-FM, an FM radio station broadcasting in Dipolog, Philippines
