= DYSW-TV =

DYSW-TV (SMNI 39 Roxas)
Roxas, Capiz; Philippines
- Branding: SMNI 39 Roxas

Programming
- Affiliations: UNTV (2011–2013); Sonshine Media Network International (2013/2014–2023)

Ownership
- Owner: Progressive Broadcasting Corporation (2011–2013); Masawa Broadcasting Corporation (2013/2014–2023)

History
- Founded: 2011
- Last air date: December 2023 (NTC suspension order & reported defiance)
- Former call signs: DYNR-TV (2011–2013)
- Former channel number: Analog: 39 (UHF) (2011-2023)
- Call sign meaning: SWara Sug Media Corporation (most recent parent company)

Technical information
- Licensing authority: NTC
- ERP: 1 kW

DYSW-TV was a commercial/relay television station most recently owned by Masawa Broadcasting Corporation affiliated with the Sonshine Media Network International. It is previously an affiliate of Progressive Broadcasting Corporation, which owns UNTV, from 2011 to 2013. The transmitter is located at Km. 1 Roxas Avenue Extension, Purok Mantinlo, Barangay 10, Roxas City, Capiz. This station is currently inactive.

The station is notable when reports surfaced that it continued operating during the 30-day suspension imposed by the National Telecommunications Commission on SMNI on December 21, 2023, resulting in the issuance of a cease-and-desist order against the network on January 18, 2024.
