= Dante Ang =

Filipino journalist (1942–2026)

Dante Arevalo Ang Sr. (June 27, 1942 – May 5, 2026) was a Filipino journalist who was the chairman emeritus and owner of The Manila Times.

== Life and career ==
Dante Arevalo Ang Sr. was born on 27 June 1942. From 1993 until 2003, Ang worked as a publicist for President Gloria Macapagal Arroyo. In December 2005, he was appointed chair of the Commission on Filipinos Overseas, staying in the post until 30 June 2010.

In 2001, Ang bought The Manila Times from its previous owner, Mark Jimenez. He was appointed Chairman Emeritus of the newspaper by the family board. President Rodrigo Duterte named him special envoy for international public relations on 3 May 2017.

In April 2019, he published an article which claimed there were plans to oust president Rodrigo Duterte, accusing several media and legal groups of destabilization attempts. He was accused by the Philippine Center for Investigative Journalism (one of the accused groups) of being "wrong on many counts" with his claims.

== Personal life and death ==
His son, Dante "Klink" Ang II, was chairman and chief executive officer of The Manila Times until his appointment in 2024 as chairperson of the Commission on Filipinos Overseas.

Ang died at the Manila Doctors Hospital in Manila on May 5, 2026, at the age of 83.
