= DWAY =

DWAY may refer to the following Philippine radio stations:

- DWAY-AM (1332 AM), an AM radio station broadcasting in Cabanatuan, Nueva Ecija, branded as Sonshine Radio
- DWAY-FM (104.3 FM), an FM radio station broadcasting in Legazpi, Albay, branded as Care 104.3 The Way FM
