= AMCARA Broadcasting Network =

Philippine television broadcast company

AMCARA Broadcasting Network, Inc.
- Type: Private
- Industry: Broadcast television network
- Founded: April 11, 1994
- Founder: Arcadio and Maria Carandang
- Defunct: June 30, 2020 (broadcast franchise lapsed/expired)
- Headquarters: ABNI Unit MR-12, 3rd Floor 331 SMRC Bldg., Katipunan Ave., Quezon City, Philippines
- Number of locations: 32 (former)
- Area served: Nationwide
- Key people: Rodrigo V. Carandang (Chairman); Jose Antonio K. Veloso (President)
- Owner: Carandang family (51%); Rodrigo V. Carandang (49%)

AMCARA Broadcasting Network was a Philippine television broadcast company. The company was located in Katipunan Avenue, Loyola Heights, Quezon City. The company was majority-owned by the heirs of Arcadio M. Carandang, one of the pioneers of Philippine television who worked for ABS-CBN.

AMCARA owned and operated a number of UHF television stations in the provinces affiliated with ABS-CBN Sports and Action (S+A, formerly Studio 23). On January 5, 2022, its former UHF frequencies (channel 23 and 43) were assigned by the National Telecommunications Commission to RPN's sister company Aliw Broadcasting Corporation (for channel 23) and Swara Sug Media Corporation (for channel 43; until December 21, 2023).

== History ==
=== 1994–1996: Early years ===
AMCARA Broadcasting Network, Inc. was incorporated on April 11, 1994.

DWAC-TV was acquired from Ermita Electronics Corporation in July 1996, which initially owned the frequency of the station that began airing in May 1992 from a densely populated commercial area in Quezon City with a rebroadcast of MTV Asia, then telecasting from the STAR TV platform. It was later showing Channel [V] refeeds from 1994 onwards as MTV made the decision to split from STAR and form its own satellite TV portal in Asia.

=== 1996–2009: Studio 23 era ===
Three years later in 1996, MTV Asia returned to the Philippine airwaves after establishing a new regional base in Singapore. ABS-CBN was picked as the broadcast arm of MTV Asia in the Philippines at the time, and DWAC-TV Channel 23 began test broadcast in September 1996 with rebroadcast of the new MTV Asia from Singapore. A month later, it launched its own programming under the station name Studio 23 and adopted the slogan "Premium Television". The station initially ran MTV rebroadcast in the day and its own shows at prime time. It also ran for 24 hours, but financial limitations forced it to sign off at 3AM every day. That has been the broadcast arrangement ever since.

Five years later, MTV Asia acquired a new local UHF frequency and Studio 23 formally became a full station, adopting rebroadcasts of its in-house music cable channel Myx to fill in the void left by MTV Asia, and came up with intensified programming led by the popular reality TV game show Survivor, and several top-rated shows from the United States like 7th Heaven, Will and Grace and Charmed, among others.

By 2004, Studio 23 opened its doors to Taglish programs and adopted a new slogan, "Kabarkada Mo!". Previous to this, the station was already running its own English newscast, "News Central", from 1999 to 2010, effectively replacing the network's The World Tonight, previously on DWWX-TV Channel 2 which had moved to a cable-only newscast on ANC, the cable news channel of ABS-CBN. Studio 23 also geared its mostly young viewers to trends in the tech world with "Digital World". With the intensified Taglish presence, Studio 23 now had the nightly Tagalog gag newscast Wazzup Wazzup, the interactive youth talk show Y Speak, and several others. It even provided support shows to its local reality programs Pinoy Big Brother and Pinoy Dream Academy, both acquired from Endemol of the Netherlands.

==== Expansion to sports programming ====
In 1998, ABS-CBN, through its sports division, ABS-CBN Sports, used mainly Studio 23 to highlight its own professional basketball league, the Metropolitan Basketball Association (MBA). The league adopted the home and away format used by the American professional league the National Basketball Association (NBA). (It however sold the franchise of the league after incurring heavy losses.) It marked the network's first serious foray into sports programming.

Later, that would be added by acquiring broadcast rights to the collegiate leagues UAAP and NCAA and the PBL.

Today, it carries a wide variety of local sporting competitions, many of which involved neighborhood schools and showcasing budding Filipino sports talents.

=== 2009–2014: Part of ABS-CBN ===
The date was brought forward and ABS-CBN Corporation's acquisition of a 49% controlling stake in AMCARA Broadcasting Network ended in 2009. This marked the formation of ABS-CBN's broadcast television subsidiary called as Studio 23 Network where the two entities were merged where it will operate under the business name of Studio 23, Inc. and the completion of integration of their UHF TV network operations as well as AMCARA Broadcasting Network. The AMCARA name will no longer be used as a terrestrial broadcaster as well as blocktime agreement, though existing AMCARA Broadcasting Network studios will keep the name.

=== 2014-2019: Studio 23 shutdown, rebranding, and divestiture ===
On January 17, 2014, Studio 23 ceased its commercial broadcast. The day after, on January 18, 2014, ABS-CBN Sports and Action, stylized as ABS-CBN SPORTS+ACTION or S+A, launched as a Filipino free-to-air sports and action channel. It was managed by ABS-CBN Sports, ABS-CBN's sports content division. The channel occupied the former channel space of its predecessor, Studio 23, a young adult-oriented network. On January 24, 2019, ABS-CBN divested its 49% stake in AMCARA to one of the majority shareholders Rodrigo V. Carandang (who is also the chief of TV5 Network engineering). ABS-CBN has also stopped paying blocktime fees to AMCARA, based on their 2019 third-quarter financial report. Carandang was named Chairman, while former GMA Network vice-president Jose Antonio Veloso was named as president.

== Issues and recent developments ==
=== ABS-CBN franchise expiry ===
On May 5, 2020, ABS-CBN Sports and Action went off-air, together with ABS-CBN, DZMM and MOR due to a cease and desist order from the National Telecommunications Commission (NTC) after ABS-CBN's legislative franchise expired on May 4. AMCARA's legislative franchise also expired on July 16 of the same year.

=== AMCARA blocktime issue ===
On June 30, 2020, during the joint hearing made by the House Franchises and Good Government committees, ABS-CBN President and CEO, Carlo Katigbak made their speech, reiterating the block-time arrangement between ABS-CBN and AMCARA, saying that was done under the standard commercial agreement. On the same day, the NTC and Solicitor General Jose Calida released two alias cease-and-desist orders against Channel 43 on ABS-CBN TV Plus, as well as satellite service Sky Direct to stop further broadcasts. Cavite 7th District representative and Senior Deputy Majority Leader, Jesus Crispin Remulla, called the block-time arrangement a dummy relationship, fraud, and a usufruct.

=== Reassignment of frequencies ===
On January 5, 2022, its former UHF frequencies (channels 23 and 43) were assigned by the NTC to Aliw Broadcasting Corporation (for channel 23) and Sonshine Media Network International (for channel 43). The latter shut down on December 21, 2023 due to a 30-day suspension order.

== Former television stations ==
Prior to its dissolution, it operates through the following television stations.

Callsign	Channel	Transmitter Location	Programming	Note
DWAC	23 (UHF)	Quezon City	S+A	Originating; owned by ABS-CBN
DWBM (Note: Formerly owned by Mareco Broadcasting Network)	43 (UHF)	Quezon City	ABS-CBN	Used for digital test broadcast.
DWEC	30 (UHF)	Mt. Santo Tomas, Benguet	S+A	Relay
DWLC	23 (UHF)	San Nicolas, Ilocos Norte	S+A	Relay
DWWA	23 (UHF)	Santiago, Isabela	S+A	Relay
DZBA	22 (UHF)	Baler, Aurora	ABS-CBN	Relay
DWAM	23 (UHF)	Botolan, Zambales	S+A	Relay
DWAS	24 (UHF)	Olongapo	S+A	Relay
DZEL	23 (UHF)	Puerto Princesa	S+A	Relay
DWEW	24 (UHF)	Lucena	ABS-CBN	Relay
DWJR	36 (UHF)	Mt. Banoy, Batangas	S+A	Frequency assigned
DWAJ	38 (UHF)	Lipa, Batangas	—N/a	Inactive
DWRC	23 (UHF)	Daet, Camarines Norte	ABS-CBN	Relay
DWBR	23 (UHF)	Legazpi, Albay	S+A	Relay
DWMC	24 (UHF)	Naga, Camarines Sur	S+A	Relay
DYAF	10 (VHF)	Jordan, Guimaras	ABS-CBN	Originating station based in Iloilo City; on-air as ABS-CBN Iloilo; assigned
DYRC	21 (UHF)	Roxas City, Capiz	ABS-CBN	Relay
DYEC	22 (UHF)	Bacolod	S+A	Relay
DYCG	23 (UHF)	Kalibo, Aklan	S+A	Relay
DYAC	23 (UHF)	Cebu City	S+A	Relay
DYEL	24 (UHF)	Valencia, Negros Oriental	S+A	Relay
DYAD	40 (UHF)	Jagna, Bohol	S+A	Relay
DYTC	24 (UHF)	Tacloban	S+A	With the now-cancelled/rejected application with the NTC.
DXFH	23 (UHF)	Zamboanga City	S+A	Relay
DYMG	42 (UHF)	Dipolog, Zamboanga del Norte	ABS-CBN	Relay
DXEC	23 (UHF)	Cagayan de Oro	ABS-CBN	Relay
DXAM	26 (UHF)	Iligan	S+A	Relay
DXAB	21 (UHF)	Davao City	S+A	Relay
DXAR	24 (UHF)	Koronadal, South Cotabato	ABS-CBN	Relay
DXAC	36 (UHF)	General Santos	S+A	Relay
DXAY	23 (UHF)	Cotabato City	S+A	With the now-cancelled/rejected application with the NTC.
DXBR	22 (UHF)	Butuan	S+A	Relay
—N/a	23 (UHF)	Surigao City	S+A	With the now-cancelled/rejected application with the NTC.

== See also ==
- ABS-CBN
- Banahaw Broadcasting Corporation
- Radio Philippines Network
- Studio 23, ABS-CBN's former UHF TV network
- ABS-CBN Sports and Action
- DWAC-TV
