= DXRE =

Radio station in General Santos, Philippines

Sonshine Radio General Santos (DXRE)
General Santos; Philippines
- Broadcast area: Soccsksargen
- Frequency: 837 kHz
- Branding: DXRE Sonshine Radio

Programming
- Languages: Cebuano, Filipino
- Format: Silent
- Network: Sonshine Radio

Ownership
- Owner: Sonshine Media Network International; (Swara Sug Media Corporation)

History
- First air date: 1971 (NBC DXRE); 1998 (as Angel Radyo); 2005 (as Sonshine Radio)
- Last air date: December 2023 (NTC suspension order)

Technical information
- Licensing authority: NTC
- Power: 10,000 watts

Links
- Website: www.sonshineradio.com

DXRE (837 AM) Sonshine Radio was a radio station owned and operated by Sonshine Media Network International. The station's studio is located in Brgy. Lagao, General Santos.

On mid-December 2023, the station, along with the rest of the network, had its operations suspended by the National Telecommunications Commission for 30 days, through an order dated December 19 but was publicized two days later, in response to a House of Representatives resolution, in relation to the alleged franchise violations.
