= Libertito Pelayo =

- Born: Libertito Pelayo
- Occupation: Newspaper Publisher
- Website: filipinoreporter.com

Libertito Pelayo is the founding publisher and editor-in-chief of the Filipino Reporter newspaper in New York City. Pelayo was educated at Far Eastern University in Manila, Philippines. An active journalist, Pelayo was formerly a reporter for The Manila Times and was also a correspondent in South Vietnam during the Vietnam War. He is a member of the New York Press Club, the Asian American Journalists Association, the Filipino American Media Association, and a former member of the United Nations Correspondents Club. Pelayo was also a former grand marshal for the Philippine Independence Day Committee, Inc. of New York City in 1997.
