= Kapamilya =

Kapamilya is the Tagalog word for "a family member".

Kapamilya may refer to:

- ABS-CBN Corporation, Philippine media and entertainment conglomerate
  - Kapamilya Channel, a 24-hour Philippine pay television network
  - ABS-CBN, known as the Kapamilya Network, main terrestrial network that operated from 1953 to 1972 and 1986 to 2020
  - ABS-CBN Sports and Action, called as Kapamilya Channel for its global counterpart from 2007 to 2011
