= DWSI =

Radio station in Isabela, Philippines

Sonshine Radio Santiago (DWSI)
Santiago; Philippines
- Broadcast area: Central Cagayan Valley and surrounding areas
- Frequency: 864 kHz
- Branding: DWSI 864 Sonshine Radio Santiago

Programming
- Languages: Ilocano, Filipino
- Format: Silent
- Network: Sonshine Radio

Ownership
- Owner: Swara Sug Media Corporation
- Sister stations: DWSA-TV

History
- First air date: 1967 (as NBC DWSI); 1998 (as Angel Radyo); 2005 (as Sonshine Radio)
- Last air date: December 2023 (NTC suspension order)
- Former frequencies: 1250 kHz (1967–1978); 1251 kHz (1978–1998)
- Call sign meaning: Santiago Isabela

Technical information
- Licensing authority: NTC
- Power: 5,000 watts

DWSI (864 AM) Sonshine Radio was a radio station owned and operated by Swara Sug Media Corporation. The station's studio and transmitter are located at the 2nd Floor, Sarangaya Bldg., Brgy. Sinsayon, Santiago, Isabela.

On the morning of June 24, 2001, DWSI's studio was shot at by unidentified men.

On mid-December 2023, the station, along with the rest of the network, had its operations suspended by the National Telecommunications Commission for 30 days, through an order dated December 19 but was publicized two days later, in response to a House of Representatives resolution, in relation to the alleged franchise violations.
