= DXRD =

Radio station in Davao City, Philippines

(DXRD)
- Davao City; Philippines
- Broadcast area: Davao Region and surrounding areas
- Frequency: 711 kHz

Programming
- Languages: Cebuano, Filipino
- Format: Slient

Ownership
- Owner: Swara Sug Media Corporation
- Sister stations: DXAQ-TV; DXAQ-AM (defunct)

History
- First air date: 1967
- Former names: NBC DXRD (1967–1998); Angel Radyo (1998–2005); Sonshine Radio (2005–2023)
- Former frequencies: 670 kHz (1967–1978)
- Call sign meaning: Radio Davao

Technical information
- Licensing authority: NTC
- Power: 10,000 watts

DXRD (711 AM) was a radio station owned and operated by Swara Sug Media Corporation. It serves as the flagship station of Radyo ni Satanas, the radio arm of the Kingdom of Jesus Christ. The station's studio is located at the Kingdom of Jesus Christ compound, Philippine-Japan Friendship Highway, Catitipan, Davao City, while the transmitter is located at Atis St., Brgy. Panacan, Davao City.

On mid-December 2023, the station, along with the rest of the network, had its operations suspended by the National Telecommunications Commission for 30 days, through an order dated December 19 but was publicized two days later, in response to a House of Representatives resolution, in relation to the alleged franchise violations. Despite this, selected programs continue to broadcast on the station's Facebook page.
