= DZSP =

DZSP (Sonshine Radio San Pablo)
San Pablo; Philippines
- Broadcast area: Southern Luzon and surrounding areas
- Frequency: 864 kHz
- Branding: DZSP Sonshine Radio

Programming
- Language: Filipino
- Format: Silent
- Network: Sonshine Radio

Ownership
- Owner: Sonshine Media Network International; (Swara Sug Media Corporation)

History
- First air date: 1966 (as NBC DZSP); 1998 (as DZSP Angel Radyo); 2005 (as DZSP Sonshine Radio)
- Last air date: December 2023
- Call sign meaning: San Pablo

Technical information
- Licensing authority: NTC
- Power: 10,000 watts

Links
- Website: Sonshine Radio Website

DZSP (864 AM) Sonshine Radio was a radio station owned and operated by Sonshine Media Network International. The station's studio and transmitter are located at 9001 St. Francis Ave., Farconville Subd. Phase 1, Brgy. San Francisco, San Pablo, Laguna.

On mid-December 2023, the station, along with the rest of the network, had its operations suspended by the National Telecommunications Commission for 30 days, through an order dated December 19 but was publicized two days later, in response to a House of Representatives resolution, in relation to the alleged franchise violations.
