= Dante Ang II =

Filipino media executive and government official

Chairperson of the Commission on Filipinos Overseas
- Incumbent
- Assumed office October 16, 2024
- Succeeded by: Romulo Arugay

Personal details
- Parent: Dante Ang (father)
- Occupation: Journalist, media executive, government official

Dante Francis "Klink" Ang II is a Filipino journalist, media executive, and government official. Appointed in October 2024, he currently serves as Chairperson of the Commission on Filipinos Overseas (CFO) with the cabinet rank of secretary.

Before his government appointment, he was The Manila Times chairman and chief executive officer.

Ang held other public roles, including chairperson of the National Book Development Board and director of the Clark International Airport Corporation

Ang started his career as a reporter for the Tulsa Tribune in Oklahoma until 1992.

== Awards and recognition ==
- Distinguished Alumni Award, Texas A&M University–Commerce (2017)
