= DXRR (Davao City) =

Defunct radio station in Davao City, Philippines

- Davao City; Philippines
- Broadcast area: Metro Davao and surrounding areas
- Frequency: 101.1 MHz

Programming
- Format: Silent

Ownership
- Owner: ABS-CBN Corporation
- Sister stations: DXAS-TV; DXAB-AM; DXAB-TV

History
- First air date: 1980s
- Last air date: May 5, 2020 (broadcast franchise lapsed/expired)
- Former call signs: DXIO (1980s-1992)
- Former names: X101 (1980s-1992); Radio Romance (1992-1995); Star Radio (1995-1997); ABS-CBN Radio (1997-2001); My Only Radio (2001-2020)

Technical information
- Licensing authority: NTC

MOR 101.1 Davao Final logo 2018 to 2020.

DXRR (101.1 FM) was a radio station owned and operated by ABS-CBN Corporation. The station's studios and transmitter were located at the ABS-CBN Broadcast Center, Shrine Hills, Matina, Davao City.

== History ==
The station was launched in the 1980s under Trans-Radio Broadcasting Corporation, owned by Emilio Tuason— the original owner of Manila’s 99.5 RT. It adopted 99.5 RT’s format and iconic slogan, “The Rhythm of the City,” which X101 also embraced.

On January 25, 1992, ABS-CBN took over the station, turning it into a relay for Manila’s Radio Romance. It was relaunched on February 16, 1995, as Star Radio 101.1 with a mass-based format. In 1997, following the creation of the Regional Network Group (RNG), it was rebranded as ABS-CBN Radio 101.1. On July 14, 2001, coinciding with the Cagayan de Oro station’s 8th anniversary, it adopted the MOR 101.1 For Life! brand as part of RNG’s rebranding. Since then, it became one of the top radio stations in the city.

On May 5, 2020, along with other My Only Radio stations, it went off the air following a National Telecommunications Commission cease and desist order after ABS-CBN’s legislative franchise expired the previous day. The station continues to operate online. Since 2021, some of its former program plugs and stingers have been used by 94.7 Power Radio (later rebranded as Max FM), where former DJ Inday Seryaka moved.

This frequency was used by the Berean Bible Baptist Church of Ecoland as 101.1 Anchor Radio from 2023 until it moved to 105.9 FM since 2025.
