= DXAQ-AM =

Radio station in Davao City, Philippines

DXAQ
Davao City; Philippines
- Broadcast area: Davao Region and surrounding areas
- Frequency: 1404 kHz

Programming
- Format: Silent

Ownership
- Owner: Sonshine Media Network International; (Swara Sug Media Corporation)
- Sister stations: DXRD-AM, DXAQ-TV

History
- First air date: 1989
- Last air date: 2010
- Former names: Q Radio (1989–2003); Kingdom Radio (2003–2010)
- Call sign meaning: Apollo Quiboloy

Technical information
- Licensing authority: NTC

DXAQ (1404 AM) was a radio station owned and operated by Sonshine Media Network International. Its studio was located at the Kingdom of Jesus Christ compound, Philippine-Japan Friendship Highway, Catitipan, Davao City, while its transmitter was located at JC Beach Resort, Samal Island, Davao Del Norte.

It formerly served as the radio arm of the Kingdom of Jesus Christ from its inception in 1989 to 2010, when it permanently went off the air, with some of its programs absorbed by sister station DXRD.
