= DXCL-AM =

Radio station in Cagayan de Oro, Philippines

Sonshine Radio Cagayan de Oro (DXCL)
Cagayan de Oro; Philippines
- Broadcast area: Misamis Oriental and surrounding areas
- Frequency: 1098 kHz
- Branding: DXCL 1098 Sonshine Radio Cagayan De Oro

Programming
- Languages: Cebuano, Filipino
- Format: Silent
- Network: Sonshine Radio

Ownership
- Owner: Swara Sug Media Corporation

History
- First air date: 1975
- Last air date: December 2023 (NTC suspension order)
- Former names: NBC DXCL (1975–1998); Angel Radyo (1998–2005)
- Former frequencies: 870 kHz (1975–1978)
- Call sign meaning: CentraL Mindanao

Technical information
- Licensing authority: NTC
- Power: 10,000 watts

Links
- Website: www.sonshineradio.com

DXCL (1098 AM) Sonshine Radio was a radio station owned and operated by Swara Sug Media Corporation. The station's studio is located at Corrales Ave. cor. Ramon Chavez St., Cagayan de Oro.

The call letters belonged to a radio station owned by Chronicle Broadcasting Network, whose frequency was on 700 kHz. It was on the air from the 60s to 1972, when Martial Law was declared.

On mid-December 2023, the station, along with the rest of the network, had its operations suspended by the National Telecommunications Commission for 30 days, through an order dated December 19 but was publicized two days later, in response to a House of Representatives resolution, in relation to the alleged franchise violations.
