= DWAY-AM =

Philippine radio station

SMNI Radio (DWAY)
Cabanatuan; Philippines
- Broadcast area: Nueva Ecija and surrounding areas
- Frequency: 1332 kHz
- Branding: DWAY SMNI Radio Cabanatuan 1332

Programming
- Language: Filipino

Ownership
- Owner: Swara Sug Media Corporation

History
- First air date: 1975 (as NBC DWAY); 1998 (as NBC Angel Radyo); 2005 (as Sonshine Radio)
- Call sign meaning: Abelardo Yabut (former owner of NBC)

Technical information
- Licensing authority: NTC
- Class: C, D, E
- Power: 5,000 watts

DWAY (1332 AM) SMNI Radio Cabanatuan was a radio station owned and operated by Swara Sug Media Corporation. and station's studio and transmitter are located along Maharlika Highway, Brgy. Bitas, Cabanatuan.

On mid-December 2023, the station, along with the rest of the network, had its operations suspended by the National Telecommunications Commission for 30 days, through an order dated December 19 but was publicized two days later, in response to a House of Representatives resolution, in relation to the alleged franchise violations.
