= DXAB-AM =

Defunct radio station in Davao City, Philippines

DXAB
- Davao City; Philippines
- Broadcast area: Davao Region and surrounding areas
- Frequency: 1296 kHz

Programming
- Format: Silent

Ownership
- Owner: ABS-CBN Broadcasting Corporation
- Sister stations: DXRR-FM; DXAS-TV; DXAB-TV

History
- First air date: 1957
- Last air date: May 5, 2020 (radio); August 28, 2020 (online)
- Former call signs: DXAW (1957–1972)
- Former names: DXAW (1957-1997); DXAV (1997-2020)
- Former frequencies: 640 kHz (1957–1972)

Technical information
- Licensing authority: NTC

DXAB Radyo Patrol 1296's logo before the shutdown.

DXAB (1296 AM) was a radio station formerly owned and operated by ABS-CBN Broadcasting Corporation. The station's studio was located at the ABS-CBN Broadcast Center, Shrine Hills, Matina, Davao City, and its transmitter was located at Km 4 McArthur Highway, Matina, Davao City.

On May 5, 2020, the station, along with the other My Only Radio stations, went off the air due to the cease and desist order of the National Telecommunications Commission. On May 8, 2020, most of its programming resumed via online feed under its name. On August 28, 2020, it signed off for the last time due to the House of Representatives' 70-11 vote to deny ABS-CBN's franchise renewal.
