= Commission on Filipinos Overseas =

Agency of the government of the Philippines

Coordinates: 14°34′38.17″N 120°59′48.67″E

- Komisyon sa mga Pilipinong nasa Ibayong Dagat
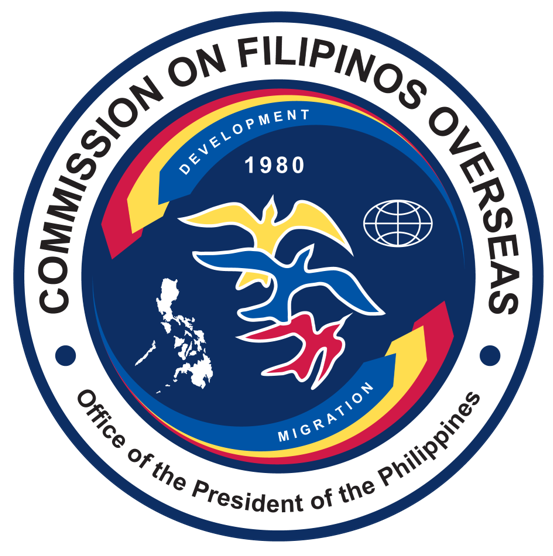

Commission overview
- Formed: June 16, 1980
- Employees: 79 (2024)
- Annual budget: ₱181.017 million Php (2023)
- Commission executive: Dante "Klink" Ang II, Secretary & Chairperson
- Parent department: Office of the President of the Philippines
- Website: cfo.gov.ph

The Commission on Filipinos Overseas (CFO; Filipino: Komisyon sa mga Pilipinong nasa Ibayong Dagat) is an agency of the government of the Philippines under the Office of the President of the Philippines. CFO was established on June 16, 1980, through the enactment of Batas Pambansa Blg. 79.

The agency is responsible for promoting and upholding the interests of Filipino emigrants and Filipino permanent residents in countries other than The Philippines. It is also responsible for preserving and strengthening ties with Filipino communities outside the Philippines. It is headed by a Chairperson who is bestowed with a Cabinet rank of Secretary.

Currently, Dante "Klink" Ang II leads the commission as its secretary and chairperson.

== History ==
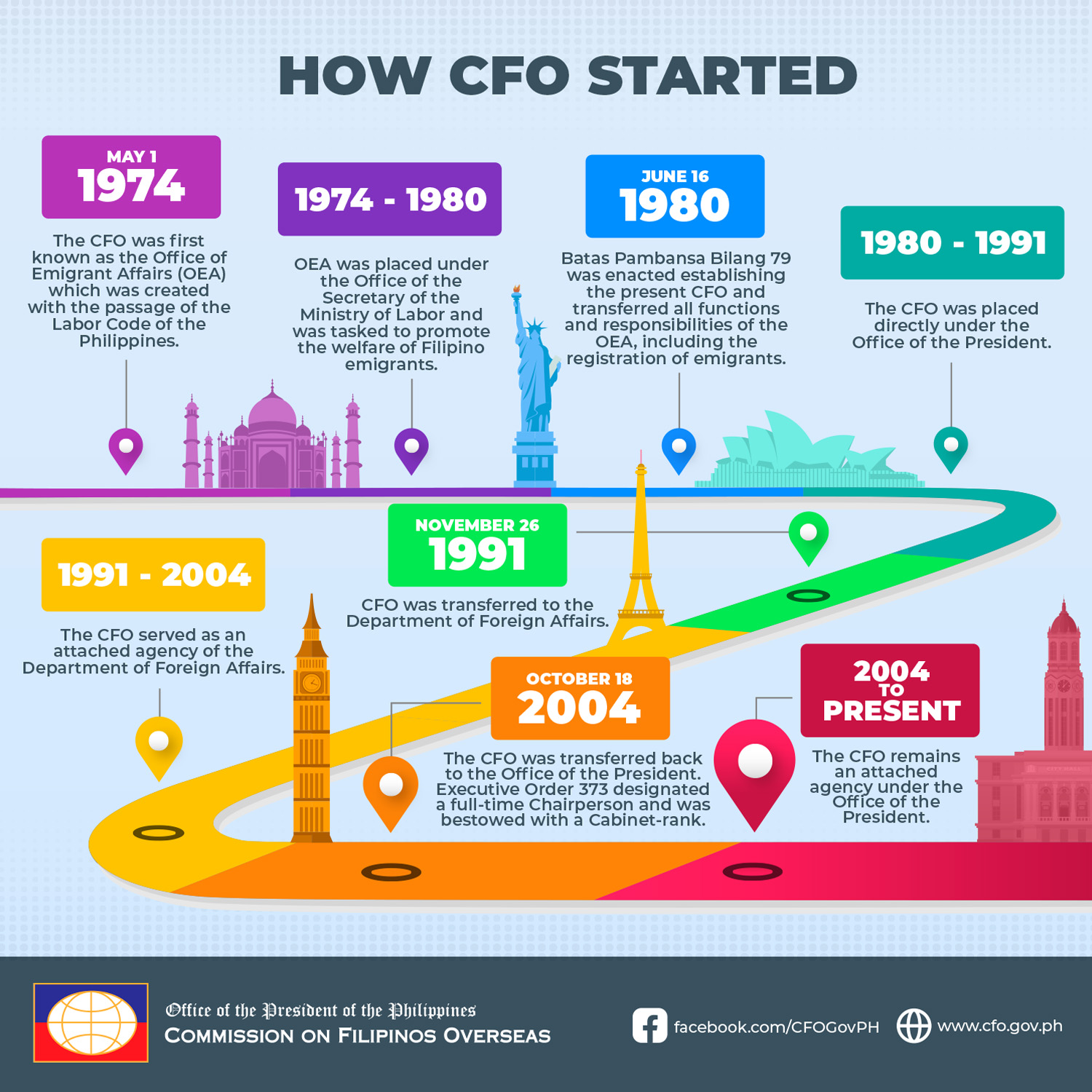

== CFO Offices ==
CFO's principal office is located in Pasay City. It has extension offices in Cebu, Baguio, Davao and Cagayan De Oro and maintains an assistance desk in NAIA Terminals 1 and 3 (departure area). The CFO may be reached thru the following contact information:

- CFO Manila - 9th Floor, NexGen Tower, C-4 Road, EDSA Ext, Pasay City, 1300 Metro Manila, Tel. No. (trunkline): (02) 8552-4700.
- CFO Cebu - Ground floor, K&J Building, #4 Don Julio Llorente St., Capitol Site, Cebu City 6000. Tel. Nos. (32) 255-5253 and (0917) 308-1378.
- CFO Davao - Door 307-309 3rd Floor Pink Walters Bldg. Ecoland-Sandawa Crossing, Quimpo Blvd, Brgy. Bucana, Davao City 8000 Davao del Sur. Tel. Nos. (82) 228-3033 and (0945) 814-4333.
- CFO Baguio - 103B First Basement, Gestdan Centrum, 80 Bokawkan, Baguio, 2600 Benguet .Tel. No: (074) 665 9103
- CFO Cagayan De Oro - 5th Floor BPO Tower SM CDO Downtown Premier, Claro M. Recto Ave, Cagayan De Oro City Telephone No: (088) 557 2028
- CFO NAIA Terminals 1 and 3 - Located at departure area. Only caters to exempted clients such as senior citizens and those who have been living abroad with PR cards. Tel. No. (02) 8879-5685

== Programs and Services ==
- Pre-Departure Orientation Seminars (PDOS) for Emigrants / Peer Counseling: The CFO conducts Pre-Departure Orientation Seminars (PDOS) for 20 to 59-year-old Filipino emigrants with the core objective of providing them the relevant information needed to address concerns about permanently residing overseas.
- Guidance and Counseling Program (GCP): During the one-on-one, counselors can address counselees’ questions on a more personal level, hopefully leading them towards empowerment, in dealing with the realities of intermarriage.
- Au Pairs Country Familiarization Seminar: Filipino au pair program participants are young individuals from the Philippines who are placed under a cultural exchange arrangement. The program allows participants to learn a new language and culture while gaining valuable life experiences.

=== PESO Sense ===
The Philippine Financial Freedom Campaign: In line with the national development goal of financial inclusion, CFO has specifically put a focus on the financial literacy of overseas Filipinos and their families. The program was launched to develop or enhance personal strategies, skills and knowledge in attaining financial freedom. This nationwide Financial Literacy Campaign seeks to achieve its main objective of improving financial literacy by promoting productive expenditures, greater savings and entrepreneurship among overseas Filipinos and the beneficiaries of their remittances.

=== Ugnayan: Through the Ugnayan Series ===
CFO engaged with several Filipino community organizations and leaders in countries with large concentrations of overseas Filipinos particularly the United States. It was an opportunity for the CFO to reach out to overseas Filipinos (organizations, media, civil society, etc.) to discuss various ways of diaspora engagement for the home country’s development.

=== Presidential Awards for Filipino Individuals and Organizations Overseas (PAFIOO) ===
The Presidential Awards for Filipino Individuals and Organizations Overseas (PAFIOO) is a biennial awards program administered by the Commission on Filipinos Overseas (CFO). It recognizes exceptional individuals and organizations abroad for their outstanding contributions to Philippine development, philanthropy, and the promotion of Filipino culture and heritage.

The awards were established under Executive Order No. 498 (1992), which institutionalized a mechanism to honor overseas Filipinos and organizations that have made significant contributions to national progress.

The program includes the Pamana ng Pilipino, Banaag, Lingkod sa Kapwa Pilipino (LINKAPIL), and Kaanib ng Bayan awards. The selection process is managed by the CFO through a multi-stage evaluation and vetting procedure, with final approval by the President of the Philippines.

In 2024, thirteen recipients from nine countries were announced and later honored at Malacañan Palace.

==== Selected recipients ====
- Pamana ng Pilipino: Larry E. Carumba (Saudi Arabia, 2024); Jane Y. Gerardo-Abaya (Austria, 2024); Roberto Eusebio R. Lavides (Canada, 2024); Melvin J. Sanicas (Switzerland, 2024).
- Banaag: Elvy G. Barroso (USA, 2024); Elvira A. Dela Cruz (Morocco, 2024).
- Lingkod sa Kapwa Pilipino (LINKAPIL): Philippine Nurses Association of New York, Inc. (USA, 2024); Neurosurgery Outreach Foundation, Inc. (USA, 2024); Leo-Felix M. Jurado (USA, 2024).
- Kaanib ng Bayan: Bader Ahmed J. Al Zafeen (United Arab Emirates, 2024); Victor Gaina (Moldova, 2024).
- Other notable past recipients: Maria Lea Carmen (Lea) Salonga (Pamana ng Pilipino, 2014); Michael Cinco (Pamana ng Pilipino, 2014); Temasek Foundation Ltd. (Kaanib ng Bayan, 2020–2022).

== Board of Commissioners ==
The Commission on Filipinos Overseas is composed of the following Board of Commissioners per Executive Order #: 373, s. 2004:

As of September 2024

- Chairman: Dante "Klink" Ang II
- Vice Chairman: DFA Sec. Enrique Manalo
- Members:
  - DTI Acting Sec. Cristina Aldaguer-Roque
  - DOLE Sec. Bienvenido Laguesma
  - DepED Sec. Juan Edgardo M. Angara
  - DOJ Sec. Jesus Crispin Remulla
  - DOT Sec. Christina Garcia-Frasco
  - PCO Acting Sec. Cesar B. Chavez
  - CFO Usec. Ma. Arlene S. Borja
