= Sonshine Media Network International =

Television channel in the Philippines

Swara Sug Media Corporation
- The logo of SMNI since 2010
- Trade name: Sonshine Media Network International
- Type: Private
- Industry: Mass media
- Founded: 1987; 39 years ago
- Headquarters: KJC Compound, Carlos P. Garcia Highway, Sasa, Buhangin, Davao City, Philippines; ACQ Tower, Santa Rita St., Guadalupe Nuevo, Makati, Philippines
- Key people: Marlon Rosete (President and CEO)
- Brands: SMNI; SMNI News Channel; Sonshine Radio
- Services: Broadcast; Television; Radio; Streaming
- Owner: Kingdom of Jesus Christ (53.46%); Phoebus Capital Holdings Inc. (46.2%); Jesus Christ Workers Members Cooperative (19%); Marlon Rosete (13%)
- Parent: Kingdom of Jesus Christ
- Channel information (SMNI)
- Type: Broadcasting network (Terrestrial television network; 2005–2023; Pay TV television channel; since 2003)
- Broadcast area: Philippines; Worldwide (satellite and online)

Programming
- Languages: English; Tagalog
- Picture format: 16:9 480i (SDTV)

Ownership
- Owner: Swara Sug Media Corporation
- Sister channels: SMNI News Channel

History
- Launched: 1 July 2000; 24 years ago
- Founder: Apollo Quiboloy
- Closed: December 19, 2023; 2 years ago
- Former names: ACQ Broadcasting Network (1987–1992); ACQ Worldwide Broadcast Ministries Q-Channel (1992–2003); Net 39 (1999–2000); ETV-39 (1998–2001); ACQ Kingdom Broadcasting Network (2003–2010)
- Website: www.smni.com

Sonshine Media Network International (SMNI), also known by its legal name Swara Sug Media Corporation (SSMC), is a Philippine broadcast media arm of the Kingdom of Jesus Christ (KJC) led by the Filipino televangelist Apollo Quiboloy. Based in Davao City and Makati, it operates a network of radio and television broadcasting stations.

It currently owns and operates a sister channel (SMNI News Channel), the broadcasting network is available over terrestrial broadcast in the Philippines (until December 2023), and on cable, satellite, and online streaming worldwide. The network now owns and operates two television networks, where the main flagship station, based in Davao City, maintains an uninterrupted 24-hour service through regular repetition of a dozen self-produced Kingdom Programs in English, Filipino, and dozens of foreign languages along with news, public affairs, public service, infotainment, sports and entertainment programs. On the other hand, the network's sister channel SMNI News Channel, based in Makati, primarily provides rolling news coverage and public affairs programs, which broadcasts exclusively in Digital TV format in Metro Manila, Metro Davao, Benguet and Cagayan de Oro (until December 2023). It also maintained a network of radio stations under the "Sonshine Radio" brand of the Swara Sug Media Corporation. SMNI also has print publications such as Guide Magazine, Pinas Newspaper and Sikat Newspaper.

The broadcasting network was licensed in late 2003 by the Philippine government to operate seven analog free-to-air television channels in key cities across the country. It also has two digital terrestrial channels in Metro Manila and Metro Davao.

SMNI has been the object of various criticisms, particularly centering on right-wing populist bias and handling its own coverage through forms of disinformation.

== History ==
The Kingdom of Jesus Christ's Media Ministry, known today as SMNI, began on the radio with the program "Pagsusi sa Kamatuoran" (Searching for Truth/Paghahanap ng Katotohanan) on radio stations DXDC and DXUM in Davao City. The television ministry began in 1991, when an inexperienced cameraman filmed a footage of Quiboloy preaching at a concert crusade using a single VHS camera; the videotapes were then sent to Manila for production, even as the ministry was about to acquire their own video production equipment at that time. This paved the way for the launching of their first television program, "The Hour of Truth" aired nationally on IBC and ABS-CBN stations in the Visayas and Mindanao, followed by "Powerline" in 1995; it would eventually moved to PTV in 1998 and returned to IBC-13 a couple of years later.

On July 1, 2000, The Kingdom of Jesus Christ officially launched its 24-hour cable network, "The Q Channel" (then also known as "ACQ–TV, Q Channel", not to be confused with defunct Philippine TV network QTV), bringing the Gospel of the Kingdom from Davao City to key cities around the Philippines, which was carried by Sky Cable in Davao City, General Santos, Bacolod, Iloilo, Cebu, Tagum, and Baguio.

On February 1, 2003, DXAQ-TV Channel 43 signed on the air and began its test broadcast as "ACQ-KBN Sonshine TV-43 Davao". On April 25, 2003, The Q Channel became the "ACQ–Kingdom Broadcasting Network" (ACQ-KBN), with an expanded reach across the Asia-Pacific region and the United States via satellite, using its own satellite uplink Broadcast station located at Davao Central, also carrying the new slogan "Delivering the Good news 24 hours a day, 7 days a week". In conjunction with this, the network launched its first free TV station, Sonshine TV-43 Davao, and introduced new religious programs such as Give Us This Day, Sounds of Worship, Batang Kaharian (lit. Kingdom Child), Way Ahead, Highest Praise, Quiet Moments, and many more.

In 2004, ACQ-KBN signed an agreement with GlobeCast World TV, which aims to expand its broadcast footprint around the world. In the same year also that KJC through ACQ-KBN launched its own radio station in Davao City as "DXAQ Kingdom Radio 1404 AM".

On January 29, 2005, KJC and ACQ-KBN acquired the congressional franchise, ownership and management of the Swara Sug Media Corporation (SSMC). at the same day, ACQ-KBN and SSMC acquired all the NBC Angel Radyo AM stations from Nation Broadcasting Corporation, which in turn, operated as the "Sonshine Radio" network.

On October 31, 2005, DWAQ-TV Channel 39 signed on the air and began its test broadcast as "ACQ-KBN Sonshine TV-39 Metro Manila". On January 8, 2006, ACQ-KBN Sonshine TV 39 was launched during the first Global Thanksgiving and Worship presentation of the Kingdom of Jesus Christ, which held at the Philippine Sports Arena in Pasig, the network ventured from Cable TV broadcasting to Free-to-Air TV broadcasting, and broadcasts with the transmitter power of 60 kilowatts.

On May 1, 2006, ACQ-KBN Sonshine TV launched "Sonshine Media Network International (SMNI)" as News and Public Affairs block which became a tie-up of ACQ-KBN Sonshine TV-39 in Metro Manila and ACQ-KBN Sonshine TV-43 in Davao, with the original slogan "Service First, Right Here, Right Now, Worldwide", at the same day ACQ-KBN Sonshine TV is now on 600 Nationwide in your Local Cable TV and Satellite TV operators across the Philippines.

On August 31, 2008, ACQ-KBN Sonshine TV 37 signed on the air and began its test broadcast as "ACQ-KBN Sonshine TV 37 Santiago, Isabela". November 9, 2008, ACQ-KBN Sonshine TV-37 was launched as the third TV station during the first Global Thanksgiving and Worship presentation of the Kingdom of Jesus Christ which held at Josefina T. Albano Sports Center in Cabagan broadcasting live from Santiago, Isabela to the world and broadcast transmitter power of 2,000 watts is the first relay station of Sonshine TV-43 Davao.

On August 1, 2010, a merger took place between ACQ-KBN and Sonshine TV, as the two programming blocks had been consolidated. As a result, the ACQ-KBN branding ceased to exist, and officially relaunched under the newly rebranded "SMNI". Coinciding with this, the network unveiled its new slogan "Alternative media, Alternative power, it Sustains Life" (first slogan) and "Informs, Delivers, Transforms" (second slogan), along with its new station ID.

On January 16, 2011, SMNI adopted another new slogan, "Where Everything is Possible", also with its new station ID.

On May 24, 2016, SMNI launched its own News and Public affairs channel as SMNI News Channel and it is exclusively aired over Digital Terrestrial Television on UHF Channel 40 in Metro Manila until 31 December 2022 (move to UHF Channel 43 starting 1 January 2023) and its internet Live streaming.

On August 31, 2019, Philippine President Rodrigo Duterte signed Republic Act No. 11422 which renewed Swara Sug Media Corporation license for another 25 years. The law grants SSMC a franchise to construct, install, operate, and maintain, for commercial purposes, radio broadcasting stations and television stations, including digital television system, with the corresponding facilities such as relay stations, throughout the Philippines.

On January 26, 2022, the National Telecommunications Commission assigned the network's television frequency on channel 43 which was formerly used by Mareco Broadcasting Network as a TV carry-over station of 105.1 Crossover from 1994 to 2000 and AMCARA Broadcasting Network for ABS-CBN's DTT broadcast on ABS-CBN TV Plus from 2013 to 2020. On 1 January 2023, SMNI began to transmit its digital test broadcast on UHF Channel 43 (647.143 MHz) as its permanent frequency assigned by NTC.

On February 19, 2023, SMNI DTT Channel 43 officially signed on during the first Global Thanksgiving and Worship presentation at the Ynares Center in Antipolo, Rizal. The network covered in Metro Manila and nearby provinces. Channel 43 was used as the main channel of SMNI on DTT, while retained the use of Channel 39 as a secondary channel after transitioning from analog to digital signal.

On December 21, 2023, the NTC suspended SMNI's free-to-air operations for 30 days due to alleged violations of its broadcast franchise. On 18 January 2024, NTC made the 30-day suspension order indefinite against SMNI citing the network failed to strictly comply to a recent order as its two stations in Region VI were operational as of 27 December 2023.

Since January 20, 2024, SMNI continues to broadcast for-pay television channels through 600 Cable TV and Satellite TV Operators across the Philippines.

== Domestic stations ==
=== TV stations ===
(Offline since December 2023 due to the NTC's shutdown order.)

==== Analog (Defunct) ====
| Branding | Callsign | Channel | Power | Type | Location |
|---|---|---|---|---|---|
| SMNI Davao | DXAQ | 43 | 50 kW | Originating | Davao City |
| SMNI Laoag | DWSB | 35 | 5 kW | Relay | Laoag |
| SMNI Vigan | DWSP | 38 | 5 kW | Relay | Vigan |
| SMNI Isabela | DWSA | 37 | 2 kW | Relay | Santiago |
| SMNI Roxas | DYSW | 39 | 1 kW | Relay | Roxas |
| SMNI Butuan | DXSW | 39 | 5 kW | Relay | Butuan |

==== Digital (Defunct) ====
| Callsign | Channel | Frequency | Power | Location |
|---|---|---|---|---|
| DWAQ | 39 | 623.143 MHz | 10 kW | Metro Manila |
| DWSY | 43 | 647.143 MHz | 10 kW | Metro Manila |
| PA | 44 | 653.143 MHz | 5.5 kW | Metro Manila |
| DXAQ | 19 | 503.143 MHz | 5 kW | Davao City |

==== Cable (since May 1, 2006) ====
| Provider | Channel | Coverage |
|---|---|---|
| Cablelink | 95 | Metro Manila |
| Converge Vision | 84 | Metro Manila |
| Sky Cable | 162 | Metro Manila |
| Sky Cable | 162 | Batangas |
| Sky Cable | 162 | Bulacan |
| Sky Cable | 59 | Baguio |
| Mountainview Satellite Corporation | 90 | Baguio |
| Prime Cable Network | 39 | Sagada |
| Sky Cable | 10 | Laoag |
| Sunshine CATV | 73 | Laoag |
| Vigan Satellite Cable TV | 73 | Vigan |
| Eaglevision Cable | 82 | Vigan |
| Eaglevision Cable | 82 | Bacnotan |
| Superior Cable TV | 95 | Bacnotan |
| Pangasinan Educational Cable TV | 35 | Alaminos |
| USATV | 58 | Dagupan |
| Sky Cable | 95 | Dagupan |
| Genmar Cable Communications | 44 | Rosales |
| Eaglevision Cable | 82 | Binalonan |
| RBC Cable Master System | 90 | Tuguegarao |
| Clearview Cable TV System | 78 | Tuguegarao |
| Regal Cable TV Network | 52 | Santiago |
| Cablelink | 95 | Santa Maria |
| Angeles City Cable Television Network | 116 | Angeles |
| Multi-Network Cable Company | 50 | Cabanatuan |
| Prime Cable Network | 66 | Cabanatuan |
| Muñoz Satellite TV System, Inc. | 97 | Muñoz |
| Choice Cable Network | 90 | Muñoz |
| Eaglevision Cable | 82 | San Manuel |
| Hi-Tech Cable TV, Inc. | 69 | Tarlac City |
| Sky Cable | 162 | Cavite City |
| Suburban Cable Network | 105 | Cavite City |
| Cablelink | 95 | Bacoor |
| Laguna Bay Vision, Inc. | 74 | Santa Cruz |
| Cablevision Systems Corporation | 68 | Santa Cruz |
| Royal Cable | 35 | Santa Rosa |
| Sky Cable | 162 | Santa Rosa |
| L&S Cable TV | 42 | San Jose, Occidental Mindoro |
| Kabayan Cable Corporation | 28 | Binangonan |
| Kabayan Cable Corporation | 28 | Angono |
| Kabayan Cable Corporation | 28 | Taytay |
| Kabayan Cable Corporation | 28 | Cardona |
| Kabayan Cable Corporation | 28 | Baras |
| Kabayan Cable Corporation | 28 | Jalajala |
| Kabayan Cable Corporation | 28 | Morong |
| Kabayan Cable Corporation | 28 | Pililla |
| Kabayan Cable Corporation | 28 | Tanay |
| Kabayan Cable Corporation | 28 | Teresa |
| Sinag Cable Network | 95 | Antipolo |
| Sky Cable | 162 | Cainta |
| Puerto Princesa CATV | 18 | Puerto Princesa |
| Prime Cable Network | 80 | Puerto Princesa |
| Prime Cable Network | 80 | Cataingan |
| Charles Cable TV System | 13 | Cataingan |
| Charles Cable TV System | 13 | Masbate |
| Masbate Cable, Inc. | 90 | Masbate |
| DCTV Cable Network | 114 | Legazpi |
| Caceres Cable TV | 65 | Naga |
| DCTV Cable Network | 114 | Naga |
| DCTV Cable Network | 114 | Sorsogon City |
| ESTV Cable Network | 108 | Sorsogon City |
| Aklan Cable TV Network | 45 | Kalibo |
| Kalibo Cable TV Network | 100 | Kalibo |
| Filvision Alto Cable | 42 | Roxas |
| Sky Cable | 50 | Iloilo City |
| Cable Star Inc. | 64 | Iloilo City |
| Sky Cable | 51 | Bacolod |
| New Bacolod Cable | 132 | Bacolod |
| San Miguel Cable Network | 64 | Jagna |
| Sky Cable Cebu | 37 | Cebu City |
| Cine Cebu Television Network | 99 | Cebu City |
| Cine Cebu Television Network | 99 | Lapu-Lapu |
| Cine Cebu Television Network | 99 | Mandaue |
| Cine Cebu Television Network | 99 | Naga |
| Sky Cable | 64 | Dumaguete |
| Fil-Products Cable Company | 76 | Dumaguete |
| Fil-Products Cable Company | 62 | Tacloban |
| Leyte Cable TV Network | 14 | Tacloban |
| D. Leopard Cable TV | 72 | Catbalogan |
| Fil-Products Cable Company | 81 | Catbalogan |
| Fil-Products Cable Company | 81 | San Jorge, Samar |
| Fil-Products Cable Company | 81 | Calbayog |
| Calbayog CATV | 95 | Calbayog |
| Sky Cable Zamboanga | 49 | Zamboanga City |
| Prime Cable Network | 37 | Sindangan |
| Misamis Cable TV Network | 69 | Ozamiz |
| Fil-Products Cable Company | 90 | Ozamiz |
| Prime Cable Network | 60 | Malaybalay |
| Parasat Cable TV | 18 | Malaybalay |
| Parasat Cable TV | 18 | Cagayan de Oro |
| Jade Cable TV | 37 | Cagayan de Oro |
| Sky Cable | 51 | Cotabato City |
| Cotabato Cable TV Network | 57 | Cotabato City |
| Sky Cable | 37 | General Santos |
| Lakandula Cable TV Network | 97 | General Santos |
| Sky Cable | 29 | Polomolok |
| JVL Star Cable | 97 | Polomolok |
| Trinity Cable TV Network | 63 | Pantukan |
| Trinity Cable TV Network | 63 | Baganga |
| Trinity Cable TV Network | 63 | Banaybanay |
| Trinity Cable TV Network | 63 | San Isidro |
| Trinity Cable TV Network | 63 | Lupon |
| Trinity Cable TV Network | 63 | Mati, Davao Oriental |
| Sky Cable | 14 | Tagum |
| Sky Cable | 14 | Davao City |
| Sky Cable | 46 | Davao City |
| Davao Cableworld Network | 97 | Davao City |
| Fil Products Cable Company | 97 | Butuan |
| Z-Energy CATV | 49 | Butuan |
| Z-Energy CATV | 83 | Medina |
| Z-Energy CATV | 08 | Alegria |
| Z-Energy CATV | 78 | Placer |
| Z-Energy CATV | 69 | Salay |
| Z-Energy CATV | 69 | Talisayan |
| GSat Direct TV | 78 | Nationwide |
| Sky Direct | 24 | Nationwide |

=== Radio stations (Defunct) ===
Sonshine Radio
- Type: Broadcast AM Radio Network
- Branding: Sonshine Radio
- Country: Philippines
- Availability: Defunct
- Founded: January 29, 2005; 21 years ago
- Parent: Swara Sug Media Corporation
- Key people: Admar R. Vilando (Station Manager)
- Launch date: January 29, 2005
- Dissolved: December 21, 2023; 2 years ago

| Branding | Callsign | Frequency | Power | Location |
|---|---|---|---|---|
| Sonshine Radio Davao | DXRD | 711 kHz | 10 kW | Davao City |
| Sonshine Radio Manila | DZAR | 1026 kHz | 50 kW | Metro Manila |
| Sonshine Radio Dagupan | DZRD | 981 kHz | 10 kW | Dagupan |
| Sonshine Radio Tuguegarao | DZYT | 765 kHz | 5 kW | Tuguegarao |
| Sonshine Radio Santiago | DWSI | 864 kHz | 5 kW | Santiago |
| Sonshine Radio Cabanatuan | DWAY | 1332 kHz | 5 kW | Cabanatuan |
| Sonshine Radio Cebu | DYAR | 765 kHz | 10 kW | Cebu City |
| Sonshine Radio Cagayan de Oro | DXCL | 1098 kHz | 10 kW | Cagayan de Oro |
| Sonshine Radio Laoag | DWAR | 819 kHz | 5 kW | Laoag |
| Sonshine Radio Ilagan | DZYI | 711 kHz | 5 kW | Ilagan |
| Sonshine Radio San Pablo | DZSP | 864 kHz | 5 kW | San Pablo |
| Sonshine Radio Zamboanga | DXYZ | 963 kHz | 5 kW | Zamboanga City |
| Kingdom Radio Davao | DXAQ | 1404 kHz | 5 kW | Davao City |
| Sonshine Radio General Santos | DXRE | 837 kHz | 5 kW | General Santos |
| Sonshine Radio Cotabato | DXRO | 945 kHz | 5 kW | Cotabato City |
| Sonshine Radio Butuan | DXRB | 873 kHz | 5 kW | Butuan |
| Sonshine Radio Bislig | DXBL | 801 kHz | 5 kW | Bislig |

== Partnership talks with CGTN ==
During former President Rodrigo Duterte's meeting with General Secretary of the Chinese Communist Party Xi Jinping in July 2023, SMNI personnel, along with Quiboloy, met with Chinese state media China Global Television Network (CGTN) executives to discuss a partnership for efficient information dissemination.

== Controversies ==
=== Alleged bias and far-right content ===
SMNI has been a subject of many criticisms and allegations from independent media watchdogs, particularly on misinformation, false accusation, and right-wing bias while maintaining its editorial control. Media institutions and sectoral rights groups have accused SMNI of spreading misinformation and fake news while at the same time attacking critics of the Duterte administration and several media outlets in the form of "red-tagging".

=== Termination of YouTube channel and Facebook page ===
On 7 July 2023, YouTube terminated the channels of SMNI and one of its programs, Laban Kasama ang Bayan (transl. Fight with the People), along with KJC, following a previous ban on Quiboloy's YouTube channel which was terminated on 21 June. Google later stated that their actions were in compliance with existing sanctions by the United States against Quiboloy pursuant to the US Global Magnitsky Act and harmful misinformation regarding red-tagging; Quiboloy was previously indicted by the United States Department of Justice on charges of human trafficking and child sexual abuse.

Quiboloy and SMNI later created accounts on the alt-tech video service Rumble as well as an alternate account for SMNI on YouTube in defiance of sanctions. The alternate account was suspended by YouTube a few days later. On 15 September 2023, the SMNI News' Facebook page was deleted, in accordance to Meta's Dangerous Organizations and Individuals Policy. Despite these, SMNI continues to evade from ban by creating and launching multiple pages under different names. On 19 March 2025, Meta took down three Facebook pages affiliated with SMNI, including from DZAR 1026 citing "expressing hatred or contempt for a group of people and using harmful racial stereotypes" that violated Meta's community standards. As of now, several Facebook pages of SMNI News programs remain active.

=== House franchise probe ===
On 28 November 2023, the Philippine House Committee on Legislative Franchises launched an investigation on SMNI, following a report claimed by Laban Kasama ang Bayan co-host Jeffrey Celiz about travel expenses allocated to House Speaker Martin Romualdez where he spent ₱1.8 billion. Quezon 2nd District Representative David Suarez called the report "fake news". The Kapisanan ng mga Brodkaster ng Pilipinas (KBP) also flagged SMNI, Celiz and co-host Lorraine Badoy for violating its Code of Ethics even when they were unaccredited broadcasters.

SMNI faced legal scrutiny following the investigation, including the revocation of its congressional franchise. PBA Partylist Representative Margarita Nograles filed a resolution urging the National Telecommunications Commission (NTC) to suspend the broadcast operations of SMNI for allegedly violating its franchise's terms and conditions.

==== Suspension of operations ====
On 21 December 2023, the NTC, in response to the House resolution, announced that it had issued two days earlier a 30-day suspension order on the broadcast operations of SMNI for alleged violations of its franchise, as well as a show cause order against the media network, giving them 15 days from receipt of the order to provide explanation on why it should not be administratively sanctioned.

SMNI later filed motions, urging three NTC officials to inhibit from its administrative case due to perceived bias, and asking the NTC to specify and detail their violations; the latter request was denied. On 22 January 2024, the suspension was made indefinite by the NTC citing the network's failure to comply with an earlier order.

At the time of issuance of the first order, the network had 13 radio stations (10 in AM, three in FM), 14 television stations, and 22 digital terrestrial television stations.

==== Franchise revocation attempt ====
On 12 March 2024, the Philippine House Committee on Legislative Franchises, headed by the committee chair Gustavo Tambunting, approved House Bill No. 9710 (filed by 1-Rider Partylist Representative Ramon Rodrigo Gutierrez) without amendments. The bill seeks to abrogate the franchise given to Sonshine Media Network International for several violations found by lawmakers. Eight days later, the Committee approved the bill on third and final reading; the bill is waiting for Senate approval. If signed into law by President Bongbong Marcos, it will repeal Republic Act No. 11422, which extended the franchise granted to Swara Sug under RA 8122.

=== Relationship with other media outlets ===
In November 2019, one of his daily comedic discussions following a performance by Gian Magdangal on Tawag ng Tanghalan: Celebrity Champions, Vice Ganda made a joke after the founder of Kingdom of Jesus Christ, Apollo Quiboloy, among other claims of being responsible for stopping calamities, claimed that he was responsible for stopping the 2019 Cotabato earthquakes. Vice Ganda jokingly challenged Quiboloy to stop the airing of It's Showtime, which is one of the longest-running ABS-CBN television programs alongside FPJ's Ang Probinsyano, and the constant traffic on EDSA, a major road network in Metro Manila. Members of Quiboloy's church took offense and expressed their dismay for Vice Ganda. Radio broadcaster and SMNI anchor, Mike Abe, a friend of Quiboloy, defended the founder and criticized Vice heavily in his program. Two days after the joke, Quiboloy instead threatened that he will not only stop FPJ's Ang Probinsyano, but also to shut down ABS-CBN as a whole within four months. The network went off-air in 2020 in a controversial franchise denial by the legislature, an act that was seen by Quiboloy and his followers as the fulfillment of his previous remarks against the comedian.

During the airing of SMNI's Laban Kasama ang Bayan, its hosts Jeffrey "Ka Eric" Celiz and Lorraine Badoy have accused journalists, including Atom Araullo and Rappler CEO Maria Ressa, and media outlets, such as Bulatlat, of being part of the CPP-NPA-NDF. In December 2024, the Quezon City Regional Trial Court ordered Celiz and Badoy to pay Araullo ₱2.08 million (US$42,233.5) in damage.

=== Libel lawsuit ===
On 14 May 2024, former senator Antonio Trillanes IV filed defamation and cyberlibel complaint affidavits with the Quezon City Prosecutors's Office against host Guillermina Barrido and several other SMNI hosts and executives following an interview where Barrido spoke of alleged false accusations that Trillanes persuaded and paid her to be a fake witness against then-President Rodrigo Duterte.

== See also ==
- Kingdom of Jesus Christ
- Sonshine Radio
- KJC King Dome
