= DWAQ-DTV =

Religious TV station in Manila

SMNI Manila (DWAQ-DTV)
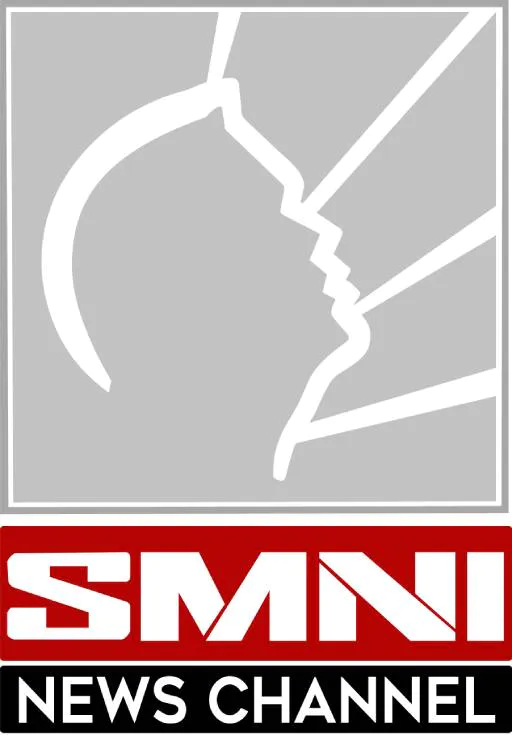
- Totoong Boses ng Bayan; Truth That Matters
- Metro Manila; Philippines
- City: Makati
- Channels: Digital: 39/43/44 (UHF); Virtual: 39.01/44.01
- Branding: SMNI DTV-39 Manila

Programming
- Subchannels: See list
- Affiliations: 39.01: SMNI News Channel; 39.02: SMNI; 39.03: SMNI Radio; 44.01: SMNI NEWS

Ownership
- Owner: Swara Sug Media Corporation
- Sister stations: DZAR Sonshine Radio 1026; SMNI 43 Davao

History
- Founded: July 27, 1999 (as Net 39); 2000 (as ETV 39); January 8, 2006 (as ACQ-KBN/SMNI TV 39 Manila)
- Last air date: December 21, 2023 (NTC suspension order)
- Former call signs: Channel 39: DZEC-TV (1999–2000) DWBP-TV (2000–2001); DWAQ-TV (2005–2022) Channel 43: DWBM-TV (1994–2000); DWBM-DTV (2013–2020)
- Former channel numbers: Analog: 39 (UHF, 1999–2001, 2005–2022); Digital: 40 (UHF, 2016–2022) 44 (UHF, 2021-2023) 39/43 (UHF, 2023)
- Former affiliations: Channel 39: Net 39 (1999–2000); ETV-39 (2000–2001) Channel 43: Mareco Broadcasting Network (1994–2000); ABS-CBN TV Plus Exclusive Channels (2013–2020)
- Call sign meaning: DW; Apollo Quiboloy

Technical information
- Licensing authority: NTC
- Power: Digital: 10 kW (channel 39) (channel 43); Digital: 5.5 kW (channel 44)
- ERP: 25 kW (channel 39); 15 kW (channel 43)
- Transmitter coordinates: 14°41′21″N 121°2′9″E

Links
- Website: www.smni.com

DWAQ-DTV (channels 39, 43 and 44) was a television station in Metro Manila, Philippines, serving as the flagship of the religious channel SMNI. Owned and operated by Swara Sug Media Corporation, the station maintained studios at the ACQ Tower, Sta. Rita Street, Barangay Guadalupe Nuevo, Makati and a hybrid digital transmitting facility at KJC Compound, Barangay Sauyo, Novaliches, Quezon City.

== History ==
=== As Net 39/ETV 39 ===
On 27 July 1999, the station began its operations on a test broadcast phase as "Net 39" under the Eagle Broadcasting Corporation, the predecessor of Net 25.

In 2000, it was acquired by Masawa Broadcasting Corporation and became ETV 39. The network attempted to become the first free-to-air gambling channel on UHF with the nightly Bingo Pilipino draws. It also aired music videos and infomercials for the Sydney Olympics 2000. However, it fizzled out in 2001 as former President Joseph Estrada banned its draws in response to public clamor.

=== As ACQ-KBN Sonshine TV / SMNI TV 39 ===
On 8 January 2006, after the series of test broadcasts (that started from November 2005 to the first few days of January 2006), DWAQ-TV ACQ-KBN Sonshine TV 39 was launched at the first Global Thanksgiving and Worship presentation at the PhilSports Arena.

In July 2006, Sonshine Media Network International was launched as News and Public Affairs block which became a tie-up of ACQ-KBN Sonshine TV-39.

In August 2010, ACQ-KBN Sonshine TV (merger of ACQ-KBN and Sonshine Media Network International) was renamed as simply SMNI.

On 19 February 2023, SMNI DTT Channel 43 officially signed on during the first Global Thanksgiving and Worship presentation at the Ynares Center in Antipolo, Rizal. the network covered in Metro Manila and nearby provinces. Channel 43 will be used as the main channel of SMNI on DTT, while retaining the use of Channel 39 as a secondary channel after transitioning from analog to digital signal. The frequency was formerly used by AMCARA Broadcasting Network under blocktime agreement with ABS-CBN Corporation to air its digital channels on ABS-CBN TV Plus. Its analog signal, on the other hand, had permanently pulled the plug sometime in 2022.

On 21 December 2023, the National Telecommunications Commission (NTC) suspended SMNI's operations for 30 days due to alleged violations of its broadcast franchise. On 18 January 2024, the NTC issued a cease-and-desist order against SMNI for violating its 30-day suspension order as its two stations in Region VI were operational as of 27 December 2023.

== Digital television ==
=== Digital channels ===
DWAQ-DTV's broadcasts its digital signal on UHF channel 39 (623.143 MHz) and is multiplexed into the following subchannels:

Channel	Video	Aspect	Short name	Programming	Note
39.01	480i	16:9	SMNI News Channel	SMNI News Channel (Main DWAQ-DTV programming)	OFFLINE
39.02	480i	16:9	SMNI	SMNI	OFFLINE
39.03	480i	16:9	SMNI Radio	DZAR	OFFLINE

UHF Channel 43 (647.143 MHz)

Channel	Video	Aspect	Short name	Programming	Note
43.02	1080i	16:9	SMNI HD	SMNI	OFFLINE
43.03	480i	16:9	SMNI News Channel	SMNI News Channel	OFFLINE
43.04	480i	16:9	DZAR SONSHINE RADIO	DZAR	OFFLINE
43.05	480i	16:9	SMNI SD1	SMNI	OFFLINE
43.06	480i	16:9	SMNI SD2	SMNI News Channel	OFFLINE
43.07	480i	16:9	SMNI Reserved Channel	SMNI	OFFLINE

In addition, Sonshine Media Network International also operates its channel on UHF Channel 44 (653.143 MHz)

Channel	Video	Aspect	Short name	Programming	Note
44.01	480i	16:9	SMNI NEWS	SMNI News Channel	OFFLINE

On 24 May 2016, SMNI began conducting a digital test broadcast with the ISDB-T standard via its UHF channel 40 (629.143 MHz) frequency.

NTC released implementing rules and regulations on the re-allocation of the UHF Channels 14–20 (470–512 Megahertz (MHz) band) for digital terrestrial television broadcasting (DTTB) service. All operating and duly authorized Mega Manila VHF (very high frequency) television networks are entitled to a channel assignment from Channels 14 to 20.

On 26 January 2022, the National Telecommunications Commission assigned the network's television frequency on began to transmit its digital test broadcast on channel 43 as its permanent frequency assigned by NTC. which was formerly used by Mareco Broadcasting Network as a TV carry-over station of 105.1 Crossover from 1994 to 2000 and AMCARA Broadcasting Network for ABS-CBN's DTT broadcast from 2013 to 2020. On 1 January 2023, SMNI began to transmit its digital test broadcast on UHF Channel 43 (647.143 MHz) as its permanent frequency assigned by NTC.

== Areas of coverage ==
=== Primary areas ===
- Metro Manila
- Cavite
- Laguna
- Rizal
- Bulacan

==== Secondary areas ====
- Pampanga
- Portion of Bataan
- Portion of Batangas
- Portion of Nueva Ecija
- Portion of Zambales

== See also ==
- SMNI TV 43 Davao
- DZAR
- Sonshine Media Network International

== Website ==
- www.kingdomofjesuschrist.org
- www.acqkbn.tv
- www.acqkbn.com
- www.sonshinemedia.com
- www.sonshinetv.com
- www.sonshineradio.com
