= Aliw Channel 23 =

Philippine digital television channel

ALIW Channel 23
- Type: Digital terrestrial television
- Country: Philippines
- Broadcast area: Greater Manila Area
- Transmitters: Nuestra Señora dela Paz Subdivision, Sumulong Highway, Barangay Sta. Cruz, Antipolo
- Affiliates: NewsWatch Plus (primetime block only)
- Headquarters: Citystate Centre, 709 Shaw Boulevard, Barangay Oranbo, Pasig

Programming
- Languages: Filipino (main); English (secondary)
- Picture format: 1080i (HDTV) (downscaled to 16:9 480i for the SDTV feed)

Ownership
- Owner: ALC Group of Companies
- Parent: Aliw Broadcasting Corporation
- Sister channels: RPTV (RPN 9); DWIZ News TV

History
- Launched: May 9, 2022; 4 years ago (test broadcast); November 18, 2022; 3 years ago (official launch)
- Founder: D. Edgard A. Cabangon (deceased); Benjamin Ramos
- Replaced: S+A (UHF 23 channel space, analog); Kapamilya Channel HD (Cignal TV channel renumbering space)
- Replaced by: Bilyonaryo News Channel (Cignal TV channel space)
- Former names: IZTV (2022–2023)

Availability

Terrestrial
- Digital: Channel 23 (Metro Manila)
- Sky Cable (Metro Manila): Channel 72
- SkyTV (Metro Manila): Channel 23
- Cignal TV (Nationwide): Channel 23
- SatLite (Nationwide): Channel 24

Aliw Channel 23 (stylized as ALIW Channel 23) is a Philippine television station owned and operated by Aliw Broadcasting Corporation. The network broadcasts on UHF Channel 23 via digital terrestrial television in Metro Manila. Its studios and broadcast facilities are located on the 20th floor of the Citystate Centre in Pasig. The network's transmitter is located in Santa Cruz, Antipolo, and shares facilities with 97.9 Home Radio.

== Background ==
On January 5, 2022, the National Telecommunications Commission granted Channel 23 to Aliw Broadcasting Corporation under a provisional authority license. The channel was previously used by Studio 23 and S+A of ABS-CBN Corporation, marking Aliw's entry into television.

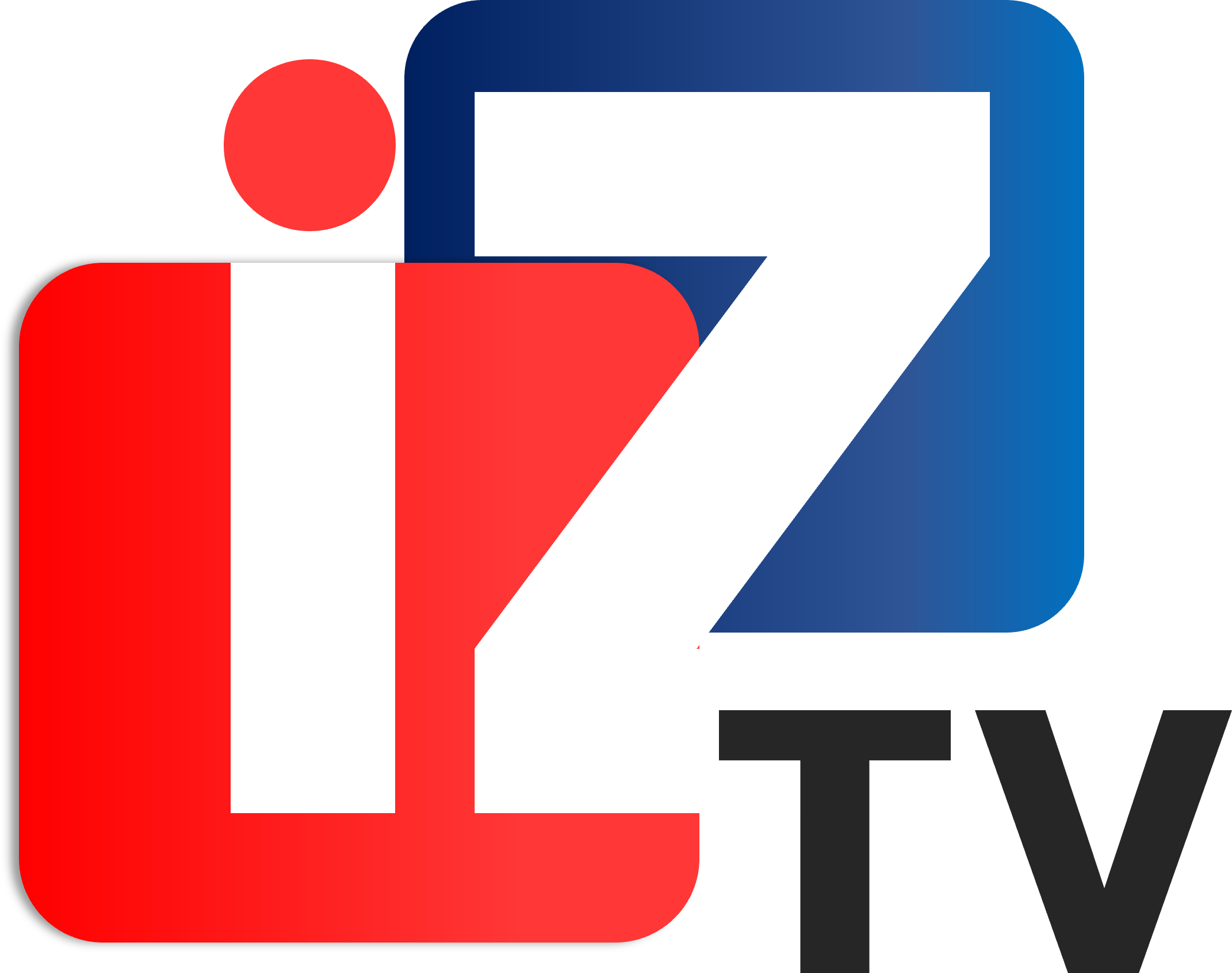
Logo used from August 2022 to January 2023.

The channel began its test broadcast with a live video feed of DWIZ 882 on May 6, 2022. On August 10, 2022, the feed was rebranded as IZTV. The official launch took place on November 18, 2022.

On January 30, 2023, the channel rebranded as ALIW Channel 23, coinciding with changes to Home Radio's provincial stations under the DWIZ network and a revamp of DWIZ's programming. An official launch event was held on June 23, 2023 at The Podium in Mandaluyong.

On July 12, 2024, Aliw Channel 23 signed a partnership agreement with Cignal TV to make the channel available on Cignal and SatLite. The following month, Aliw entered two partnership deals with Broadreach Media Holdings to air NewsWatch Plus programming and with Radio Philippines Network for re-runs of RPN's classic comedy shows and sitcoms.
