= Studio 23 =

Defunct free-to-air television channel in the Philippines

- Type: Broadcast UHF television network
- Country: Philippines
- Founded: October 12, 1996; 30 years ago
- Owner: AMCARA Broadcasting Network (1996–2014; de jure); ABS-CBN Corporation (1996–present; de facto)
- Key people: Vince Rodriguez (Head)
- Launch date: October 12, 1996; 30 years ago
- Dissolved: January 17, 2014; 12 years ago
- Official website: https://web.archive.org/web/20131031132840/www.studio23.tv
- Language: Tagalog (main); English (secondary)
- Replaced by: S+A (later Aliw Channel 23)

Studio 23 (officially Studio 23, Inc. and stylized in all uppercase as STUDIO 23) was a Philippine free-to-air television network owned by AMCARA Broadcasting Network. The network was named for its flagship station in Metro Manila, DWAC-TV and carried on UHF channel 23. The network was a sister network of the main channel, ABS-CBN, airing programming aimed towards young adults, such as North American imports and other English-language programming, and original Tagalog programming aimed at the demographic as well, such as supplemental programming for ABS-CBN programs. This station studios were located at 3/F ABS-CBN Broadcasting Center, Sgt. Esguerra Ave., Mother Ignacia St., Diliman, Quezon City.

== History ==
The 6th Studio 23 logo used from August 1, 2010, to July 13, 2012.

The 7th Studio 23 logo used from July 14, 2012, to January 16, 2014.

At a planning session during the mid-1990s, ABS-CBN staff members were plotting out plans for a new UHF channel offering a more "upscale" alternative to the main ABS-CBN. In the lead-up to the launch, ABS-CBN acquired the rights to many syndicated American imports, such as Wheel of Fortune and The Oprah Winfrey Show.

The flagship station, DWAC-TV owned by the AMCARA Broadcasting Network, signed on about a month before the launch of Studio 23, simulcasting MTV Asia.

Studio 23 was officially launched on October 12, 1996, but as a timeshare with MTV Asia aired during the daytime, with Studio 23 programming taking over in the primetime hours; Meckoy Quiogue was appointed as managing director of the network. Its strategy was to offer foreign shows to Filipinos at a time when the channel of ABS-CBN was shifting its programming from foreign acquisitions to local programs. The first program aired on the launch night was the 1992 film The Bodyguard. Two days later, the news program News 23 premiered, produced by ABS-CBN News and Current Affairs. Studio 23 also became the first UHF television network to broadcast in full surround stereo.

On January 1, 2001, ABS-CBN severed their ties with MTV Asia, and Studio 23 gained total control of DWAC-TV. MTV moved to DZRU-TV after the change and relaunched as MTV Philippines and ABS-CBN launched their own music channel, Myx. Also that day, it launched a new slogan, "Cool TV". Upon the retirement of Quiogue in December 2001, Leo Katigbak was appointed as his replacement. On February 22, 2003, Studio 23 simulcasted with ABS-CBN Channel 2 for four months.

Studio 23's programming evolved from being "upscale" (as suggested by their previous slogan as the "Premium Network") to a young adult demographic. The network aired a multitude of US imports, but also aired original programming, such as spinoffs and supplemental programming for shows aired on the main ABS-CBN network, such as Pinoy Dream Academy and Pinoy Big Brother. The network won numerous awards from various groups, such as a silver medal in the Print category at the 2006 Promax Awards. Its flagship program, the talk show Y Speak, also won numerous awards and accolades. In 2010, the network was reformatted from English back to Taglish, first adopted in 2004.

Studio 23, on its 17-year broadcast has ceased its commercial operations on the dawn of Friday, January 17, 2014, right after its final programs Myx and O Shopping, a video presentation was shown. The station thanked its viewers for the past 18 years on-air. The station officially closed down at around 2:00 am. The following day, an unnamed station aired and used the words "Test Broadcast" on the supposed position of the Studio 23 logo. On the same day, teasers began showing for the replacement channel. Studio 23 was replaced by ABS-CBN's free TV sports channel, S+A (programming would be 70% sporting events and 30% movies/entertainment/newscast) effective January 18.
