= The Manila Times =

Broadsheet newspaper in the Philippines

- Trusted since 1898

- Front page on January 12, 2018
- Type: Daily newspaper
- Format: Broadsheet
- Chairman emeritus: Dante Ang^{†}
- Chief Executive Officer: Anna Marie Ang-Thompson
- President: Blanca C. Mercado
- Executive editor: Arnold E. Belleza
- Managing editors: Leena Calso Chua; Lynette O. Luna
- Founded: October 11, 1898; 127 years ago
- Political alignment: Centre-right
- Headquarters: 409 A. Soriano Avenue, Intramuros, Manila, Philippines
- Country: Philippines
- Circulation: 120,700 (2012)
- Language: English
- ISSN: 0116-3558
- OCLC: 31041091
- Website: www.manilatimes.net

The Manila Times is the oldest extant English-language newspaper in the Philippines. It is published daily by The Manila Times Publishing Corp. (formerly La Vanguardia Publishing Corporation) with editorial and administrative offices at 2/F Sitio Grande Building, 409 A. Soriano Avenue, Intramuros, Manila.

It was founded on October 11, 1898, shortly after news that the Treaty of Paris would be signed, ending the Spanish–American War and transferring the Philippines from Spanish to American sovereignty. It presently bills itself as having the fourth-largest circulation of the newspapers in the Philippines, beating the Manila Standard, but still behind the Philippine Daily Inquirer, the Manila Bulletin and The Philippine Star.

On May 1, 2017, its chairman emeritus Dante Ang was appointed by President Rodrigo Duterte as special envoy of the President for international public relations.

Anna Marie Ang-Thompson is the chief executive officer while Blanca C. Mercado is the president and chief operating officer. Arnold E. Belleza, formerly of BusinessWorld, is the executive editor.

== History ==
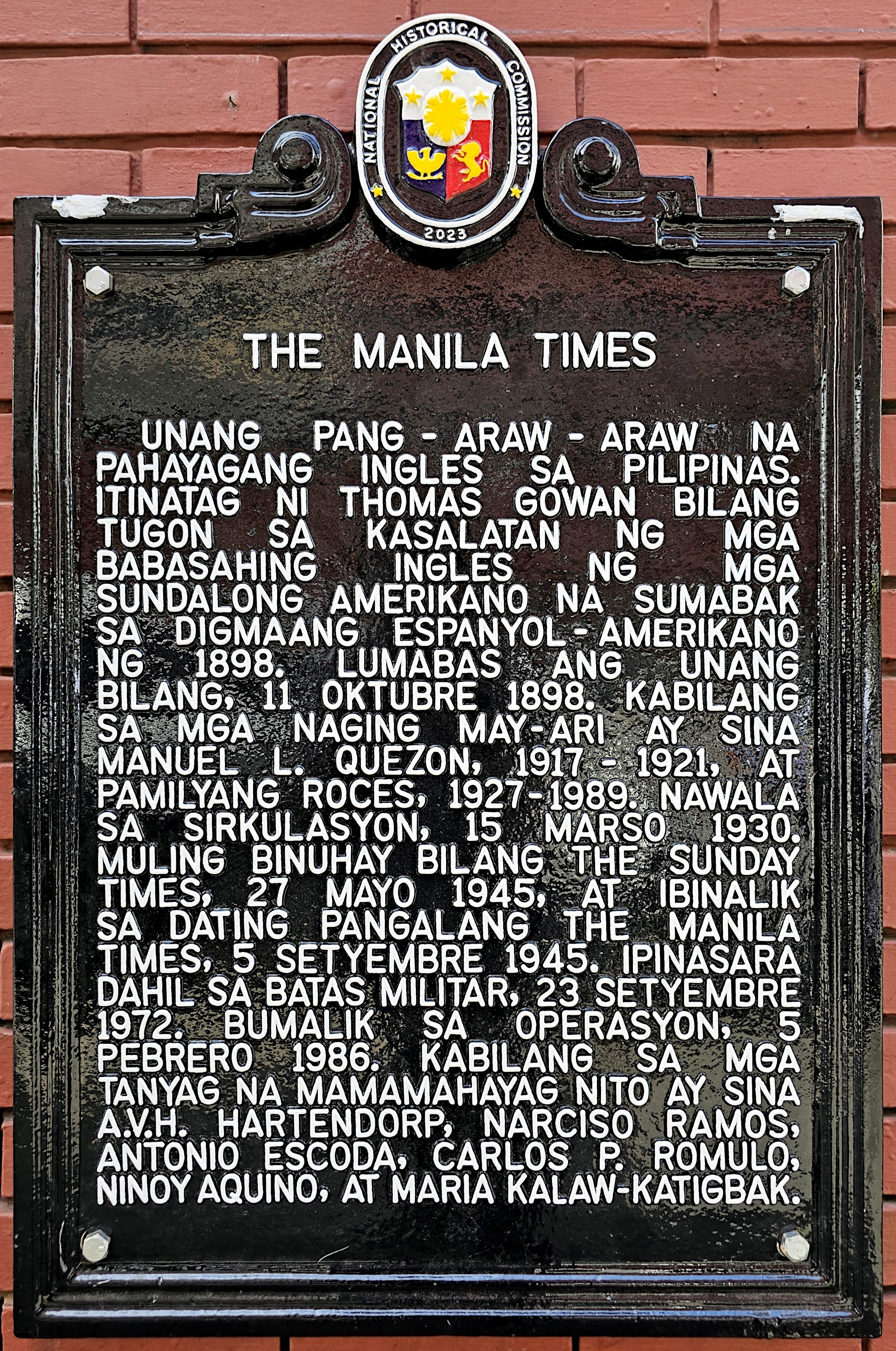
National historical marker installed at the newspaper's office building in 2023 to commemorate its 125th anniversary

The Manila Times was founded by Thomas Gowan, an Englishman who had been living in the Philippines. The paper was created to serve mainly the Americans who were sent to Manila to fight in the Spanish–American War. At the time, most of the newspapers in the Philippines were in Spanish and a few others were in the native languages. Shortly after the paper's founding, reports reached Manila about the Paris Conference that would lead to the treaty where Spain ceded its claim over the Philippines to the United States.

The first issue of The Manila Times on October 11, 1898, had a sheet of two leaves, or four pages, measuring about 12 by 8 inches, each page divided into two columns. The first page was taken up by announcements and advertisements. Page 2 was the editorial page. It contained the editorials and the more important news of the day. Page 3 was devoted to cable news from Europe and the United States all bearing on the Spanish–American War.

In 1899, George Sellner acquired The Manila Times from Gowan, who joined the paper as business manager. In 1902, an American businessman acquired The Manila Times, reacquired by Sellner in 1905. In 1907, Thomas C. Kinney acquired The Manila Times from Sellner. On July 25, 1914, The Manila Times moved its headquarters from the Escolta Street to the Cosmopolitan Building.

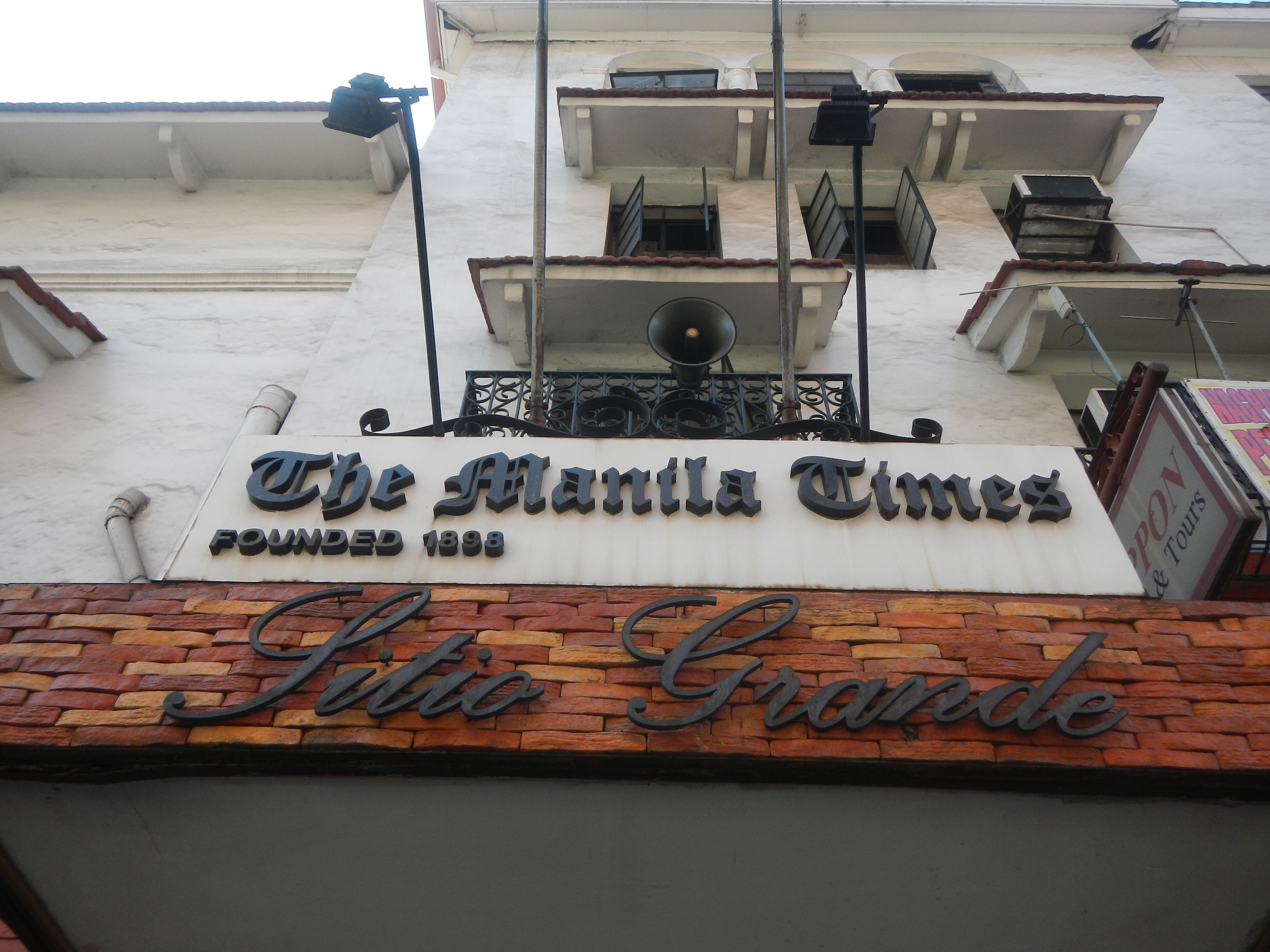
The Manila Times Building in Intramuros, Manila

In 1919, Manuel L. Quezon, the future Philippine President during the Commonwealth period, acquired The Manila Times and he owned until 1921, when sugar magnate George Fairchild acquired the paper. In 1926, Jacob Rosenthal acquired The Manila Times from Fairchild. On December 10, 1928, the Cosmopolitan Building was destroyed by a fire and The Manila Times headquarters were moved to Intramuros. On March 15, 1930, The Manila Times was shut down for the first time until 1945, when the paper re-opened after World War II and was later sold to Chino Roces. By 1950, The Manila Times became the largest circulating newspaper in the Philippines.

On September 23, 1972, President Ferdinand Marcos declared martial law with Proclamation No. 1081, he ordered the closure of media establishments throughout the country, including The Manila Times, it marked the second time the newspaper closed since 1945 and its owner Chino Roces was arrested. On February 5, 1986, The Manila Times re-opened, several days before the People Power Revolution that ousted Marcos and installed Corazon Aquino as president. Roces died on September 30, 1988, and in 1989, the paper was acquired by businessman John Gokongwei.

In 1999, The Manila Times faced controversy when it published a story about President Joseph Estrada, who was described as an "unwitting godfather" in a deal between the National Power Corporation (NAPOCOR) and Argentine firm Industrias Metalurgicas Pescarmona Sociedad Anonima (IMPSA). On March 9, Estrada filled a libel suit against The Manila Times; the owners printed an apology on its front page, triggering the resignation of the paper's editors and writers.

On July 20, 1999, The Manila Times was acquired by Katrina Legarda and Reghis Romero and then shut down for the third time on July 23 and later re-opened on October 11. Mark Jimenez acquired the paper on May 14, 2001 until he sold it to Dante Ang, a publicist for President Gloria Macapagal Arroyo, on August 8, 2001. Ang's maternal grandfather had previously worked as a linotypist at The Manila Times, with Ang visiting the offices as a child in the 1950s to borrow money from him.

In July 2006, Ang established a monthly supplement for the newspaper called The Moro Times, which catered to a Muslim ("Moro") readership.

In April 2025, the newspaper was sued by House Majority Leader Mannix Dalipe for cyberlibel in reporting the existence of a document reportedly signed by him detailing a plot by the House of Representatives titled Oplan Horus to undermine former president Rodrigo Duterte, who was being investigated by the chamber over the Philippine drug war, and Vice President Sara Duterte, who was impeached by the same body.

== Notable columnists ==
=== Current ===
- Persida Acosta
- Leonor Briones
- Norberto Gonzales
- Orly Mercado
- Salvador Panelo
- Danton Remoto (also serves as the paper's news editor)
- Ricardo Saludo
- Francisco Tatad
- Rigoberto Tiglao

=== Former ===
- Arnold Clavio
- Ernesto Herrera
- Rene Saguisag
- Ali Sotto

== See also ==
- The Philippine Star
- Philippine Daily Inquirer
- Filipino Reporter
- Libertito Pelayo
- Satur Ocampo
