= Guadalupe Nuevo =

Barangay in Makati, Metro Manila, Philippines

- Barangay
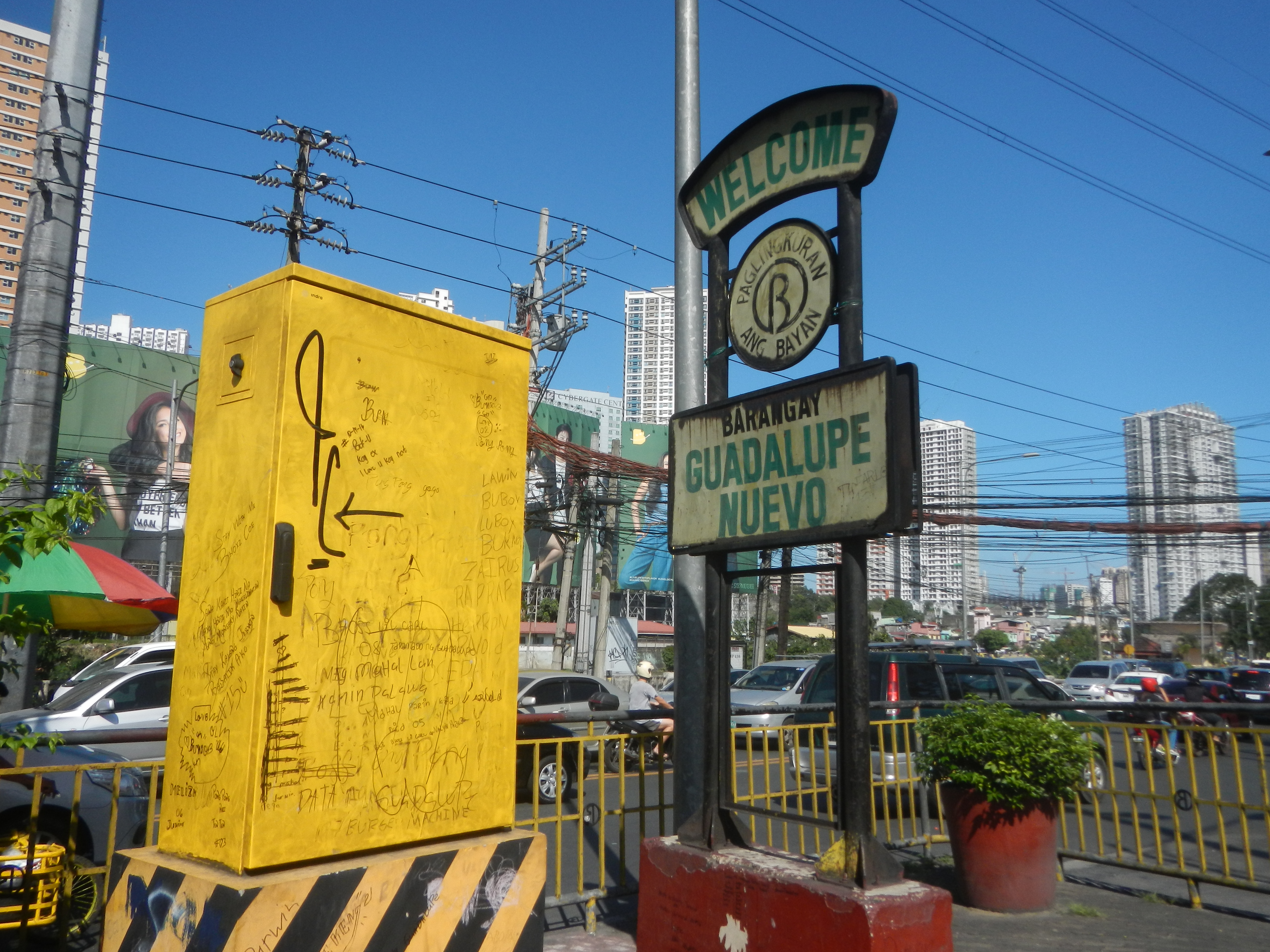
- Welcome signage to the Barangay
- Interactive map of Guadalupe Nuevo
- Location within Metro Manila
- Coordinates: 14°33′31.31″N 121°2′40.47″E
- Country: Philippines
- Region: National Capital Region
- City: Makati
- District: 2nd district of Makati

Government
  - Barangay Captain: German "Jerry" Sunga

Area
  - Total: 0.57 km^{2} (0.22 sq mi)

Population (2020)
  - Total: 20,533
  - Density: 36,000/km^{2} (93,000/sq mi)
- ZIP code: 1212
- Area code: 2
- PSGC: 137602009

Guadalupe Nuevo (Tagalog pronunciation: [gwɐdɐˈlupɛ ˈnwɛbo]; lit. 'New Guadalupe') is one of the 23 barangays of Makati, Philippines. It is the easternmost barangay of the city and belongs to the second legislative district of Makati. It is surrounded by EDSA and the Pasig River to the north, Barangay Guadalupe Viejo to the west, Barangay Pinagkaisahan to the south, and Taguig to its east and south. Prior to its establishment, it forms part of barrio Guadalupe. The Guadalupe MRT station is located along the barangay's boundary with Guadalupe Viejo. Various terminals of jeepney routes are also located in this barangay, thus the area is a transport hub. The old headquarters of Metropolitan Manila Development Authority is found in this barangay.

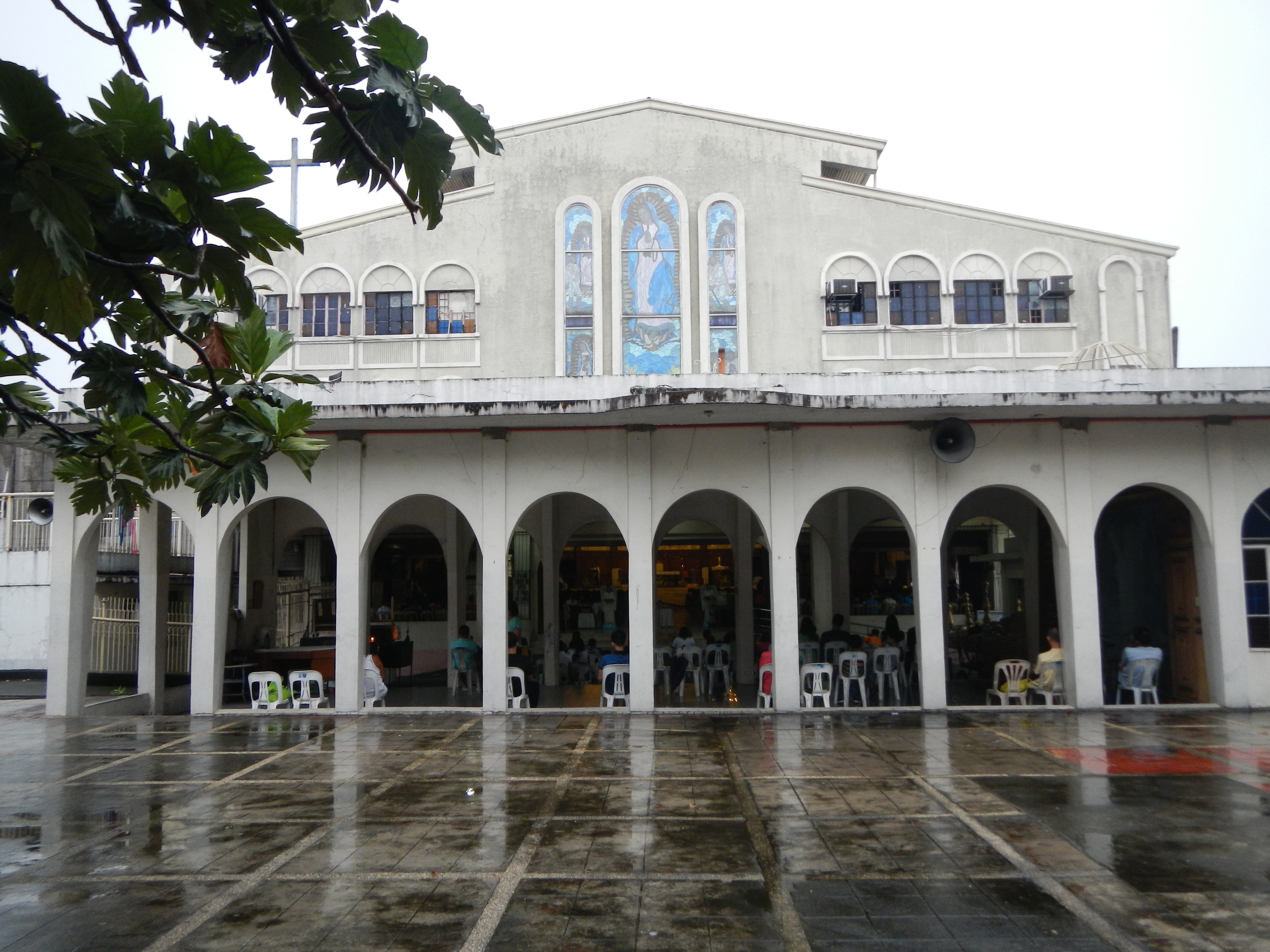
National Shrine of Our Lady of Guadalupe is located in Guadalupe Nuevo.
