= DXAQ-TV =

SMNI TV 43 Davao (DXAQ-TV)
- Metro Davao; Philippines
- City: Davao City
- Channels: Analog: 43 (UHF); Digital: 19 (UHF)

Ownership
- Owner: Sonshine Media Network International
- Sister stations: DXRD Sonshine Radio 711, DXAQ Kingdom Radio 1404

History
- Founded: January 28, 2005
- Last air date: December 21, 2023 (NTC suspension order)
- Former channel numbers: Digital: 44 (UHF, 2017–2018)
- Call sign meaning: Apollo Quiboloy

Technical information
- Licensing authority: NTC
- Power: Analog and digital: 5 kW
- ERP: Analog: 50 kW

Links
- Website: SMNI.com

DXAQ-TV was the flagship television station of Philippine religious television network Sonshine Media Network International (SMNI). Its studios were located at the Kingdom of Jesus Christ compound, Philippine-Japan Friendship Highway, Sasa, Davao City, while its transmitter was located at Shrine Hills, Matina, Davao City.

On 21 December 2023, the National Telecommunications Commission (NTC) suspended SMNI's operations for 30 days due to alleged violations of its broadcast franchise. On 18 January 2024, the NTC issued a cease-and-desist order against SMNI for violating its 30-day suspension order as its two stations in Region VI were operational as of 27 December 2023.

== Digital television ==
=== Digital channels ===
UHF Channel 19 (503.143 MHz)

Channel	Video	Aspect	Short name	Programming	Note
39.01	480i	16:9	SMNI	SMNI	OFFLINE due to cease and desist order by NTC.
39.02	480i	16:9	SNC UPLINK	SMNI News Channel	OFFLINE due to cease and desist order by NTC.

== Areas of coverage ==
=== Primary areas ===
- Davao City
- Davao del Sur
- Davao del Norte

==== Secondary areas ====
- Portion of Davao de Oro

== See also ==
- DWAQ-TV
- DXRD
- Sonshine Media Network International
