= List of real estate properties owned by ABS-CBN =

ELJ Communications Center serves as the headquarters of the company

This is the list of real estate properties owned by ABS-CBN Corporation, a Philippine media and entertainment company currently based in Quezon City.

== Real estate properties ==
=== Current ===
- ELJ Communications Center (PEZA IT Center; headquarters)
- ABS-CBN Foundation Warehouse, located at 13 Examiner St., Quezon City
- Horizon IT Park (also known as ABS-CBN Soundstage and PEZA IT Park; under construction), located in Igay Road, Barangay Sto. Cristo, San Jose del Monte City, Bulacan.
- ABS-CBN Regional Active Properties and Offices (regional office scattered across the Philippines that are still active and not abandoned, used by ABS-CBN Regional commonly for news purposes and to broadcast local and national shows)

=== Former ===
- ABS Building, EDSA–Roxas Boulevard Intersection, Pasay (demolished, now occupied by Kanlaon Condominium)
- CBN Building, Aduana Street, Intramuros, Manila (now occupied by commercial establishments)
- ABS-CBN Broadcasting Center (soon to be demolished)
  - Dolphy Theater (formerly known as Studio 1, ABS-CBN's only theater on ABS-CBN Studios)
  - ABS-CBN JUSMAG Compound (used by production divisions)
  - ABS-CBN Main Building (used by ABS-CBN News and Current Affairs, ABS-CBN Radio, and ABS-CBN Studios)
  - ABS-CBN Studios (studios and production facilities; used by ABS-CBN Studios (not to be confused with the production division of the same name) and ABS-CBN News)
  - Millennium Transmitter (main television transmitter)
  - ABS-CBN Audience Entrance (used for audience accommodations)
  - The Development and Talent Center or DTC Building (offices and studios; used by ABS-CBN's talent management, Star Magic and divisions)
- Pinoy Dream Academy Building (demolished due to the expiration of its lease agreement; 2006–2023)
- ABS-CBN Vertis Tent (used for entertainment purposes and bazaar; located inside Ayala Malls Vertis North)
- ABS-CBN Regional Abandoned Properties and Offices (closed and abandoned due to the expiration of its free-to-air broadcast franchise in 2020)
- Original Pinoy Big Brother House, Performance Area and Dormitory (located beside the ELJ Communications Center, demolished; 2005–2026)
- Gina Lopez Building (also known as ABS-CBN Foundation Building; offices of the company's foundation, converted into the new location of Pinoy Big Brother House and the foundation's offices moved to ELJ Communications Center; 1990–2026)
