= History of ABS-CBN =

History of the Philippine media and content company

ABS-CBN logo (September 7, 2013–present), a revised second version of the 1999 logo. (Note: Concurrently used with the 1999 logo (which became the secondary logo on March 24, 2016) since September 7, 2013.)

ABS-CBN (Note: an acronym for Alto Broadcasting System – Chronicle Broadcasting Network) is a Philippine media and content company. It serves as the flagship media brand of ABS-CBN Corporation, a subsidiary of Lopez Holdings Corporation. Formerly the Philippines' largest free-to-air television network, ABS-CBN has since evolved into a multi-platform content producer and distributor following the expiration and non-renewal of its broadcast franchise in 2020. The company currently syndicates its programming across various platforms, including partner networks, cable channels, streaming services, and digital platforms.

== 1946–1972: Beginnings ==
The company was founded on June 13, 1946, as Bolinao Electronics Corporation (BEC) and later registered on July 11 of the same year. BEC was established by James Lindenberg, one of the founding fathers of Philippine television, an American electronics engineer who went into radio equipment assembly and radio broadcasting.

In November 1949, James Lindenberg shifted Bolinao to radio broadcasting with DZBC and masterminded the introduction of television to the country in 1953. Bolinao Electronics Corporation established its broadcast unit, Bolinao Broadcasting System (BBS); its first studios were located at a rented barn in San Juan, Rizal (which is now part of the National Capital Region).

In 1951, Lindenberg partnered with Antonio Quirino, brother of then-Philippine President Elpidio Quirino, in order to try their hand at television broadcasting. In 1952, BEC was renamed as Alto Broadcasting System or ABS (with Alto Sales Corporation as its corporate name). "Alto" was a contraction of Quirino's and his wife's first names, Tony and Aleli. Though they had little money and resources, ABS was able to put up its TV tower by July 1953 and import some 300 television sets. The initial test broadcasts began in September of the same year. The very first full-blown broadcast was on October 23, 1953, of a party in Tony Quirino's humble abode. The television station was known as DZAQ-TV. The first program to air was a garden party at the Quirino residence in Sitio Alto, San Juan. After the premiere telecast, the station followed a four-hour-a-day schedule, from six to ten in the evening.

On June 16, 1955, Republic Act No. 1343 signed by President Ramon Magsaysay granted the Manila Chronicle its broadcasting franchise, leading to the formation of the Chronicle Broadcasting Network.

The Chronicle Broadcasting Network (CBN) was founded on September 24, 1956, by Eugenio López Sr. and the former Philippine Vice President Fernando Lopez. The network initially focused only on radio broadcasting. It launched its very own TV station, DZXL-TV 9, on April 19 (or July), 1958. On February 24, 1957, Don Eugenio acquired ABS from Quirino and Lindenberg. A month later, Don Eugenio also acquired Monserrat Broadcasting System.

In 1958, the network's new headquarters at Dewey Boulevard were inaugurated, and all radio and television operations were consolidated into its two buildings – the radio stations at the Chronicle Building at Aduana Street, Intramuros, Manila and the TV operations at the brand new Dewey Boulevard building in Pasay, Rizal.

The ABS-CBN brand was first used in 1961. However, it was only two years later on 1963, that the company name was changed to ABS-CBN Broadcasting Corporation (or shortened to ABS-CBN Broadcasting). Before it was named ABS-CBN Broadcasting Corporation, the company name was Bolinao Electronics Corporation (BEC).

In the late 1950s, Don Eugenio's son Geny saw the potential of TV and radio to reach and link Filipinos across the archipelago. By the mid-1960s, the ABS-CBN network was leading the radio industry, with stations like DZXL and DZAQ Radyo Patrol in the Manila area, which featured journalists like Ernie Baron, Bong Lapira, Orly Mercado, Joe Taruc, Mario Garcia, Jun Ricafrente, Bobby Guanzon, and Rey Langit, and various other stations nationwide. ABS-CBN also made breakthroughs in the TV industry by achieving the country's first color TV broadcast, first satellite feed broadcasts (during remarkable events including the Apollo 11 Moon landing, the collapse of Ruby Tower in Manila during the 1968 Casiguran earthquake, assassination and funeral of Robert F. Kennedy and the 1968 United States presidential election), and first use of videotape, among others. It featured top shows then, such as Your Evening with Pilita and Tawag ng Tanghalan, the country's first comedy show Buhay Artista, first Philippine game show, What's My Living and the first noontime show Student Canteen, among others. It was also pioneering in marathon election coverage in 1967 when the TV & radio stations of the network aired election updates for 36 hours sharp – making it a national first.

ABS-CBN logo (May 1968–September 21, 1972; September 14, 1986–1989). (Note: Reused in 1986 as a secondary logo until 1989.)

On June 15, 1961, Geny officially opened the first provincial TV station in Cebu (based in Mandaue) airing 4 hours with the tallest transmitter tower (in that time) measuring 216 feet (66 m). Within weeks, another TV station in Dagupan opened its doors followed by the first broadcasts in Negros Island (through Bacolod) in 1963. Panay had its first station in Iloilo City which opened in 1964, the Soccsksargen region then followed up with the opening of its own regional station in 1965 and Baguio and Davao both followed suit in 1967.

Two years later, the network's first color test broadcasts began with the help of the Radio Corporation of America (RCA). Color broadcasts started in June 1966, the first in the Philippines and Southeast Asia as the network was tagged as the "First in Color Television", with full-color broadcasting beginning in 1971 in all national television stations.

On December 18, 1968, ABS-CBN opened its new Broadcast Center on Bohol Avenue (renamed Sgt. Esguerra Avenue in 1989), Quezon City, where it still stands today. At the time, it was the most advanced broadcast facility in Asia. The station again made breakthroughs by using the first live satellite transmissions from abroad, foremost of which was the 168-hour coverage of the first Moon landing in 1969 and the 1968 Summer Olympics in Mexico the year before. The network enjoyed a big portion of the ratings and won various awards and recognitions from different organizations. The network pioneered the first all-national news simulcasts also in the same year as well.

By 1972, the ABS-CBN network owned and operated two television stations and seven radio stations in Manila and 14 radio stations and three originating television stations in the provinces. In the mid 60s, ABS-CBN launched its iconic "The Philippines' Largest Network" signature jingle — which is known for its now-familiar six-note leitmotif — composed by Dominic Salustiano.

== 1972–1981: Martial law era ==
The network suffered its first setback with the declaration of martial law by president then dictator Ferdinand Marcos On September 23, 1972, two days after the signing of Proclamation No. 1081, ABS-CBN and its affiliate stations were seized. Almost 10,000 employees lost their jobs as a result of the takeover and shutdown of ABS-CBN.

ABS-CBN president Geny López was arrested in November 1972, imprisoned and held without trial for five years until he and his cellmate Sergio Osmeña III launched a daring jailbreak on October 1, 1977. They fled into exile in the United States together with their families.

ABS-CBN general manager Jake Almeda Lopez was also jailed for a year for his protest activities. After his daring and successful escape from Fort Bonifacio, he joined López in exile in the United States and kept himself busy protesting the Marcos Sr. dictatorship from abroad. He was a key figure in the protest over the Bataan Nuclear Power Plant.

The network was taken over by Roberto Benedicto, a crony of Ferdinand Marcos, then-Philippines ambassador to Japan, and sugar plantation owner, who used the Broadcasting Center at Bohol Avenue, then renamed "Broadcast Plaza", as the home of Government Television/Maharlika Broadcasting System (GTV/MBS, originally from Intramuros) and Kanlaon Broadcasting System/Radio Philippines Network (KBS/RPN, after the studio in Pasay was destroyed by fire on June 6, 1973). DZAQ-TV Channel 2 was relaunched under Banahaw Broadcasting Corporation (BBC) on November 4, 1973, with a new call sign (DWWX-TV), logo, slogan and a theme song (composed by Jose Mari Chan entitled "Big Beautiful Country"). In July 1978, BBC moved to new headquarters (together with RPN and the Intercontinental Broadcasting Corporation (IBC)) in Broadcast City (also in Diliman, Quezon City). DZXL-TV Channel 4 was taken over by the government agency National Media Production Center (NMPC) for the launch of Government Television (GTV) as DWGT-TV on February 2, 1974. The network's radio stations were also affected with BBC and KBS/RPN operating several of the stations. BBC and RPNs would pioneer the country's first true computer-generated imagery animations for station identifications in the early 1980s.

== 1986: Capture of Broadcast Plaza ==
At the height of the People Power Revolution in 1986, the operations of the Benedicto networks were halted after reformist soldiers disabled the transmitter that was broadcasting Marcos' inauguration from Malacañang Palace. Upon Corazón C. Aquino's subsequent accession to the presidency, BBC, RPN, IBC and the Broadcast City complex were sequestered by the new government and placed under the management of a Board of Administrators tasked to operate and manage its business and affairs subject to the control and supervision of Presidential Commission on Good Government.

== 1986–2007: Rebirth and growth ==
ABS-CBN logo (September 14, 1986–2026), the second version of the 1967/68 logo. (Note: Used primarily from 1986 to March 12, 2000 and secondarily from March 2000 until the demolition of ABS-CBN Broadcasting Center in 2026. It was concurrently used with the 1999 logo from 1999 to March 12, 2000.)

On March 1, 1986, after the People Power Revolution, Geny Lopez returned to the country after self-exile in the United States and started rebuilding the station from the rubbles after the revolution. Recovery was difficult and resources were low; former ABS-CBN employees Freddie García, Ben Aniceto and Rolly Cruz were brought in to rework the station's programming.

BBC shut down its operations on March 20, 1986, due to the sequestration of the facilities. BBC returned its operation in April 1986. The Presidential Commission on Good Government approved the return of the network's flagship station Channel 2 and a portion of the ABS-CBN Broadcast Center to the Lopezes in June 1986. The Lopez family continued to own ABS-CBN during the Marcos regime and all lease arrangements it entered into with the Philippine government and the Benedicto group for the use of its frequencies and facilities were never entirely recovered. Despite the handover of ownership, DWWX-TV continued to be used as the callsign of the network's flagship station in Metro Manila. BBC shut down its radio operations on July 15, 1986. Later, BBC shut down its television operations on September 7, 1986. After 7 days, ABS-CBN was reopened on September 14, 1986.

In January 1987, the network was forced to share space in the building that was rightfully their own with the government TV station Channel 4 (until January 22, 1992). At the time, money had been scarce while resources were limited; offices were used as dressing rooms and other equipment such as chairs, tables, and phones were in short supply. Aniceto, who worked as the program director for radio and television of the network and station manager of Channel 2 in the 1970s, was served as the first vice president and general manager of ABS-CBN upon the network's reopening from 1986 to 1987 and its radio stations re-opened in July 1986.

On March 1, 1987, Channel 2 was relaunched with the live musical special, The Star Network: Ang Pagbabalík Ng Bituin (The Return of the Star) which noted for the then-brand-new numerical white tri-ribbon channel 2 logo with a white rhomboidal star (from 1988 to 1993 the ribbons were tri-coloured in red, green and blue) as a centerpiece of the network's revival. It was also when Peter Musñgi returned to ABS-CBN to replace George Boone Mercado which was the network's short-lived voiceover or announcer from September 1986 to March 1987. By 1988, ABS-CBN had regained its foothold in the Philippine TV ratings from being a cellar dweller (#5) to being number 1 again nationally - as a result of the rebranding.

Within the year, ABS-CBN also beefed up its news programs with TV Patrol, anchored by a team of newsreaders composed of Noli de Castro, Mel Tiangco, Frankie Evangelista, and Angelique Lazo, with the late Ernie Baron telling the daily weather forecast. Other reputable news programmes followed, such as Magandang Gabi... Bayan and Probe as well as the cultural magazine show Tatak Pilipino hosted by the former anchor Gel Santos-Relos and former APO Hiking Society member Jim Paredes, and Hoy Gising!. The entertainment programs of ABS-CBN were also revamped with series that previously aired on RPN and IBC, which included Eat Bulaga!, Okay Ka, Fairy Ko!, The Sharon Cuneta Show, Chika Chika Chicks, Goin' Bananas, Loveliness, Kapag May Katwiran, Ipaglaban Mo!, and Coney Reyes on Camera, while producing original content (initially co-productions with Regal Television), which included The Maricel Soriano Drama Special, Ryan Ryan Musikahan, Ang TV, Sa Linggo nAPO Sila, Showbiz Lingo, Oki Doki Doc, Mara Clara, Maalaala Mo Kaya, Palibhasa Lalake, Teysi ng Tahanan, Home Along Da Riles, and Wansapanataym.

Another feature of its return to the top of the ratings is the introduction of the live-action sentai and tokusatsu show formats from Japan, with Bioman, Goggle V, Gavan, and Shaider, the latter the first ever tokusatsu program to be aired in English and Filipino to Philippine television full-time (after a brief appearance on RPN). Filipino-dubbed anime programmes, another network and Philippine television first, would only begin in the transition to the 1990s, and 1987's Hikari Sentai Maskman, aired by the network, was the first ever sentai program to dub in Filipino.

Within months after the relaunch in Manila, the revived network also restarted regional programs and broadcasting starting in Baguio, Cebu, Bacolod and Davao (and later in Zamboanga and Cagayan de Oro). Within the 1990s, the network also helped open new stations in other parts of the country, while reopening stations that were used before.

On December 11, 1988, with the first marathon broadcast of the Australian produced television miniseries A Dangerous Life, ABS-CBN began shifting to satellite broadcast, enabling the entire country to watch the same programs simultaneously. This was also the very year when the network began international broadcasts to Guam and Saipan, in the Northern Marianas, also via satellite, yet another first for Philippine and Asian television. At the same time, the network began to increase the number of local TV programs being aired and produced.

Slowly, the station inched its way to financial recovery, which it achieved by 1990, regularly garnering around 70% of the market and that year, the company was listed to the Manila Stock Exchange (MSE) before its merger with Makati Stock Exchange (MkSE) to form the Philippine Stock Exchange (PSE). In 1992, ABS-CBN Talent Center (now Star Magic) was formed and in 1993, ABS-CBN launched Star Cinema as the company began to diversify. In 1995, Star Music, also known as Star Records and ABS-CBN Music, was launched. In that year, ABS-CBN also launched their own website, ABS-CBN.com, the first Filipino television network in the World Wide Web. It was created by its IT department, Internet Media Group. (IMG, which later became ABS-CBN Interactive). On March 30, 1998, ABS-CBN Holdings Corporation was incorporated as Worldtech Holdings Corporation, for the primary purpose of issuance of the Philippine Depository Receipt (PDR) and the acquisition and holding of shares of ABS-CBN Corporation. Its Philippine depository receipt (PDR) is traded in the Philippine Stock Exchange under the ticker symbol ABSP.

On September 24, 1994, ABS-CBN signed a historic deal with PanAmSat to bring the first trans-Pacific Asian programming to some two million Filipino immigrants in the United States. This deal would later gave birth to The Filipino Channel which is now available globally.

The network has also syndicated its programs for international audience through its ABS-CBN International Distribution division. Among the programs that gained popularity abroad are Pangako Sa 'Yo, Kay Tagal Kang Hinintay, Lobo, Sana Maulit Muli, Kahit Isang Saglit, and Be Careful with My Heart.

Nine years after the revival on March 30, 1995, Republic Act No. 7966 signed by President Fidel Ramos granted ABS-CBN its legislative franchise for the second time.

Geny Lopez died of cancer on June 29, 1999, in the United States. This happened months before the network celebrated the millennium and unveiled its new logo on the final stages of the construction of ELJ Communications Center in late 1999, and inaugurating its Millennium Transmitter on the company grounds on March 7, 2000. This resulted in a clearer signal for its television and radio stations in Mega Manila.

ABS-CBN logo (1999–present). (Note: Used primarily from 1999 to March 23, 2016, and secondarily since March 24, 2016 when the network's free-to-air terrestrial channel's sign-on and sign-off was changed on March 24, 2016 now having the 2013 logo. The logo is concurrently used with the 1986 logo from 1999 to March 12, 2000, and 2013 logo since September 7, 2013 as it is still used inside ABS-CBN Broadcasting Center, first version of the 2008 logo of its primetime block Primetime Bida from January 2008 to May 2020, ID lace of some employees, microphone flags, and headers of some of the company and network sectors' websites.)

In 2002, Finance Asia ranked ABS-CBN as the 8th best-managed company in the Philippines in its "Asia's Best Companies 2002" survey. The survey covers the performance of the top companies in 10 countries in Asia. Finance Asia polled institutional investors and equity analysts for this survey. In the same year, the network was started to broadcast in full stereo.

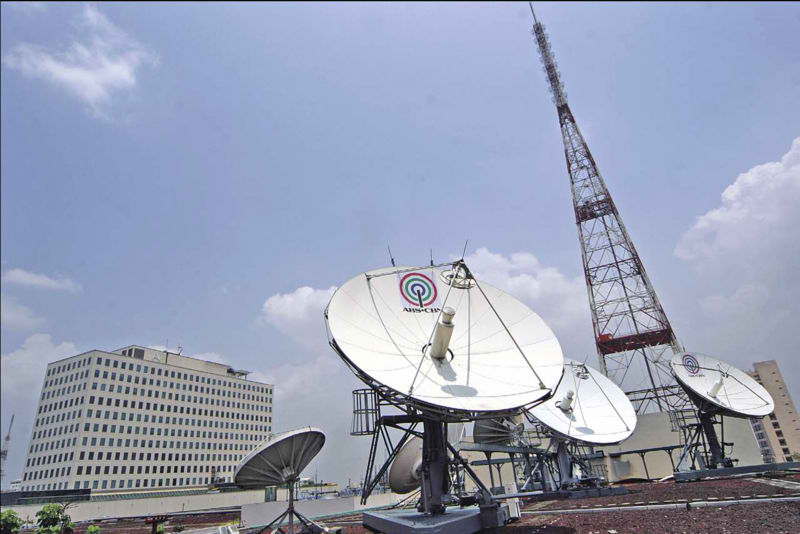
The ABS-CBN Broadcasting Center in Diliman, Quezon City, the soon to be demolished headquarters portion of ABS-CBN.

The ELJ Communications Center, the media company and network headquarters of ABS-CBN.

In 2003, during the 50th anniversary of Philippine television, ABS-CBN launched its present brand name, "Kapamilya" (literally means "a member of the family"). The network celebrated its golden anniversary in 2003. It also launched a promo called "Treasure Hunt", where the people were invited to bring their oldest television, radio sets, microphones, and posters. The network also celebrated its 16-year reign in the TV ratings, with 13 of their shows included in the Top 15 daily programs in TV. ABS-CBN also launched several new shows including Final Fantasy: Unlimited, Crush Gear, Rave, and Yu-Gi-Oh!. The company also did a nationwide caravan, showcasing the network's talents.

In October 2003, the network held a month-long celebration of ABS-CBN and Philippine TV's 50th year. The station produced two commemorative documentaries about the station's contribution in news and entertainment. Sa Mata ng Balita encapsulated some of the most unforgettable, most remarkable, and most celebrated landmarks of the last 50 years, as captured by television news. 50 Taong Ligawan: The Pinoy TV History, on the other hand, was the first extensive television documentary done about the history of Philippine television and the evolution of Philippine entertainment.

In 2004, the network launched a series of new programs including Naruto, Ragnarok the Animation, Marina, Sarah the Teen Princess, At Home Ka Dito, Nginiiig!, Yes, Yes Show!, Mangarap Ka, Art Jam, Salamat Dok, Rated K, and a televised search for the network's new set of young talent entitled Star Circle Quest. During the last quarter of that same year, ABS-CBN lost its position as the leading network in Mega Manila to GMA Network following the success of the rival network's fantaserye Mulawin which caused Charo Santos-Concio to almost resign from the network whereas it still dominated the TV ratings in Visayas and Mindanao.

In 2005, the network launched another set of new programs in their bid to regain lost audience share through a campaign entitled Iba Magmahal ang Kapamilya. These programs include Homeboy, Goin' Bulilit, Wowowee, Bora, Search for the Star in a Million and Quizon Avenue. In March of that same year, responding to Perceptions Inc.'s Tara Na, Biyahe Tayo, ABS-CBN and Star Music teamed up with the Philippine Tourism Authority (now the Tourism Infrastructure and Enterprise Zone Authority) for an all-star version of their Pilipino Sa Turismo'y Aktibo tourism anthem which featured selected contract artists such as Gary Valenciano, Kris Aquino, Ai-Ai delas Alas, Vhong Navarro, Piolo Pascual, Jericho Rosales, Claudine Barretto, Erik Santos, Gloc-9, Sheryn Regis and Heart Evangelista. However, the song's lack of extensive support by the mother network led to its obscurity.

The network later ventured into franchised reality shows with the launch of Pinoy Big Brother which proved to be a smashing success and helped them regain their lost position as the leading network in Mega Manila.

== 2007–2020: Continued growth, company and network diversification ==
On August 21, 2007, the company began to use the ABS-CBN Corporation name to reflect its diversification with ABS-CBN Broadcasting Corporation is still used on some uses as such both names are now alternatively used since then. It occurred four months after the start of HD broadcasts on the network with Rounin on April 16, 2007, and was announced publicly one year later in 2008 during the network's and Philippine television 55th anniversary on its station ID "Beyond Television". The anniversary TV plug depicts the growth of ABS-CBN from a small television station that started in 1953 into a media company that has businesses beyond television. The Wall Street Journal Asia ranked ABS-CBN as the 7th most admired company of the Philippines and 3rd in the Innovation Award category for its innovation in internet TV with TFC Now! (now iWantTFC) service. According to chairman Gabby Lopez during its annual stockholders' meeting 2–3 years after the adaptation of the newer 2007 name happened and announced, respectively, in May 2010, he said that it is "a response to the changes in the media landscape brought about by technology. The media business has gone beyond merely broadcasting to encompass other platforms."

ABS-CBN welcomed former GMA Network artist Angel Locsin to its roster of talents also in August 2007, the same month as when the media company's newer 2007 name was first used, which was seen as a controversial headlines because of her leading GMA's top-rating soaps; she actually started in ABS-CBN as part of a Star Circle batch six years earlier.

From May 2009 to December 22, 2011, ABS-CBN covered the two-year transition of all levels of Philippine politics including the cancelled 2011 Autonomous Region in Muslim Mindanao (ARMM) election where officers-in-charge (OIC) were appointed that ended the term of 2008-2011 officials. In response to the first automation of the election in the country, ABS-CBN utilized a technology from Orad Hi Tech Systems Ltd. that utilizes the principles of augmented reality. The technology uses real-time image processing system for live broadcasts of 3D computer-generated imagery against a real set or background. ABS-CBN also utilized what was probably the biggest touch screen display to be used in a Philippine television show. A new set dubbed as the "WAR" (Wireless Audience Response) room was specifically designed for the said election coverage. ABS-CBN also utilized what was probably the biggest touch screen display to be used in a Philippine television show. A new set dubbed as the "WAR" (Wireless Audience Response) room was specifically designed for the said election coverage. The network covered the events of 2010 through Mga Kwento ng Bayan 2010: ABS-CBN News and Current Affairs Yearend Special anchored by Korina Sanchez and Noli de Castro. The coverage of ABS-CBN became the third top trending topic worldwide on the social networking site Twitter.

On January 1, 2013, coinciding with the kick-off of their 60th anniversary celebrations, Charo Santos-Concio was appointed as the new chief executive officer of the company, taking over from Gabby Lopez. Lopez remains the chairman of the company.

On May 28, 2013, ABS-CBN Corporation, through its subsidiary ABS-CBN Convergence, Inc. (formerly known as Multi-Media Telephony, Inc.), signed a network sharing agreement with Globe Telecom for a new mobile telephony service in the country. The agreement includes the sharing of assets including switches, towers, servers, and frequencies. ABS-CBN is expected to spend between 2 and 3 billion pesos for the next two years to build up its telco business. The plan has been approved by the National Telecommunications Commission and now operates as ABS-CBN Mobile. It ceased operations on November 30, 2018, after both ABS-CBN and Globe decided not to renew their network-sharing agreement after assessing its mobile business model as financially unsustainable. The two companies will remain committed for partnership for content sharing using its existing resources.

In July 2013, ABS-CBN started the development of KidZania Manila family entertainment center in Bonifacio Global City in Taguig. However, due to the losses amid the COVID-19 pandemic in the Philippines, KidZania Manila was permanently closed on August 31, 2020.

On October 5–6, 2013, the network celebrates the 60th year of ABS-CBN and the Television in the Philippines through Grand Kapamilya Weekend. It is broadcast the two TV specials on It's Showtime at the Quezon Memorial Circle and on ASAP at the Marikina Sports Center.

On May 30, 2014, ABS-CBN and its former president and CEO Charo Santos-Concio received the Gold Stevie Awards for the categories Services Company of the Year - Philippines and Woman of the Year at the Asia-Pacific Stevie Awards held in the Lotte Hotel, Seoul, South Korea.

ABS-CBN also received the coveted Gold Stevie Awards for the category Company of the Year - Media & Entertainment at the 11th annual International Business Awards (IBA) which was held in Paris, France, on October 10. As a result of the win, ABS-CBN also won the vote-based People's Choice Stevie Awards for Favorite Companies in the Media and Entertainment Category, while their chairman Eugenio Lopez III received the lifetime achievement award from the KBP.

On March 19, 2015, Finance Asia ranked ABS-CBN as the third-best mid-cap company in the Philippines. ABS-CBN is the only Filipino media company included on Asia's best companies 2015 list of Finance Asia. Also in this year, ABS-CBN was included on the 2015 Top Companies report of JobStreet.com which rank the country's top employers. ABS-CBN is ranked 7th on the list.

On January 1, 2016, Carlo L. Katigbak was appointed as the new president and chief executive officer of the company, taking over from Charo Santos-Concio, who have succeeded her mandatory retirement age of 60. Concio will still be the network's chief content officer, president of the newly created ABS-CBN University, executive adviser to the chairman, and board of directors of the company. One month later, the network also announced the appointment of Head for Free TV Maria Socorro Vidanes as the COO for broadcast of ABS-CBN effective February 1, 2016.

In 2016, ABS-CBN Corporation is the only media company included on the top ten 2016 Top Companies of JobStreet.com in the Philippines ranking, at number ten. These companies are chosen by JobStreet.com as the "most desired employers" in the country.

On April 19, 2018, during the company's annual stockholders meeting, the ABS-CBN Board of Directors voted in favor and elected Eugenio "Gabby" Lopez III as the Chairman Emeritus and his cousin, Chief Technology Officer Martin "Mark" Lopez as his successor as chairman of the network. Gabby Lopez will be the second executive to be elected as Chairman Emeritus, succeeding his late father, Eugenio "Geny" Lopez Jr. In February 2017, ABS-CBN upgraded Control Rooms 3 and 10 at its TV production studios in Quezon City with identical Lawo mc^{2}56 audio consoles. The new consoles replaced two dated desks and were installed by Broadcast Communications International, the main contractor for the upgrade. The IP-based Lawo production consoles – each with 64 faders and providing 270 DSP channels, a routing capacity of 5120×5120 crosspoints, integrated Waves SoundGrid servers and connectivity via four DALLIS I/O frames, mark the first Lawo equipment installations in the Philippines. The modernized IP-ready studio control rooms went on-air in January 2018.

In June 2018, it received the YouTube Diamond Creator Award for being the first YouTube channel in the Philippines to reach 10 million subscribers for its entertainment channel. The channel is also one of the only three channels in Southeast Asia to have reached the milestone on the popular video-sharing platform, after Thai TV network Workpoint and Thai entertainment company GMM Grammy. It also becomes the first YouTube channel in the Philippines to hit 20 and 30 million subscribers.

In July 2018, ABS-CBN won a prestigious Gold Quill award of excellence at the International Association of Business Communicators (IABC) Gold Quill Awards in Montreal, Canada for its "Wow at Saya" audience experience program for the network's live shows such as It's Showtime and ASAP Natin 'To.

In 2018, ABS CBN won 30 awards during the 16th Gawad Tanglaw awards and also won 34 awards during the 32nd Star Awards for Television for their good TV programs and personalities.

Also, in December of the same year, ABS-CBN inaugurated its new state-of-the-art sound stages studio complex called Horizon IT Park located at San Jose del Monte, Bulacan which was on par with Hollywood standards. The Phase 1 of the project includes its first two sound stages each sized of 1,500 square meters, with the first stage was named for its chairman emeritus, Eugenio Lopez III who visioned of the new studios, The EL3 Stage. The complex also includes backlots, facilities for its production and post-production, and offices. The studios will be used for its upcoming teleserye The Faithful Wife and its reality singing competition show, Idol Philippines, using the name as "Idol City".

In September 2019, ABS-CBN ventured into Hollywood production for the US film and TV outfit Electric Entertainment, which is headed by Filipino-American producer Dean Devlin. The American TV series Almost Paradise was shot in Cebu, and aired in the United States via the cable company, WGN America. It was ABS-CBN's first foray into Hollywood television production. The series' production in Bigfoot Soundstage in Cebu began filming in November 2019.

=== Horizon IT Park ===
In 2011, ABS-CBN announced the development of a state-of-the-art studio complex in San Jose del Monte, Bulacan, which is on par with Hollywood standards for a projected cost of 6 to 7.5 billion pesos. A 120 hectare lot in San Jose del Monte, Bulacan was acquired earlier that year for 75 million pesos. In 2014, it was announced that the studio complex will consist of 10 sound stages and backlots each. The company plan to build at least two sound stages a year for a cost of 600 million pesos or 300 million pesos for each sound stage.

The proper of the project started in the first quarter of 2014 with its construction commenced in May 2017. The production and support teams for both TV and feature films began a three-year training program for the stages both in Hollywood and the Philippines to ensure that production processes mirror the best practices in the world.

On December 12, 2018, after years of planning and training, ABS-CBN inaugurated its new state-of-the-art studio complex which is revealed to be called Horizon IT Park. The complex was designed by California-based architecture firm Bastien and Associates, Filipino firm AIDEA, with a consultants from Hollywood-based Manhattan Beach Studios. The Phase 1 of the project includes its first two sound stages sized at 1,500 square meters, with the first stage named for its chairman emeritus, Eugenio "Gabby" Lopez III who is the brainchild of the new studio complex, The EL3 Stage. The complex also included backlots, facilities for its production and post-production and offices. The new studios used for the upcoming teleserye The Faithful Wife, and its most anticipated movie, Darna. A new soundstage was finally used for its reality singing competition show, Idol Philippines, using the name as "Idol City".

== 2020: COVID-19 pandemic, franchise renewal issue and shutdown ==
On February 10, 2020, Solicitor General Jose Calida has submitted a petition to the Philippine Supreme Court to end ABS-CBN's franchise due to allegations that foreigners were allowed to be involved in the company's ownership.

On March 10, 2020, in the wake of the World Health Organization-declared COVID-19 pandemic that had also spread across the Philippines, as well as President Rodrigo Duterte's declaration of state of public health emergency after the first local transmission of COVID-19 was confirmed, ABS-CBN announced that it would temporarily suspend its admission of studio audience in tapings for its game, talk, variety and reality shows, including Magandang Buhay, It's Showtime, ASAP Natin 'To, Banana Sundae and the second season of the Philippine version of South Korean game show I Can See Your Voice, to provide safety and well-being to its artists, crew and production teams. The aforementioned shows would, however, continue to air in production without a studio audience.

Then on March 15, 2020, ABS-CBN temporarily suspended production of its entertainment shows, after Metro Manila was put under a community quarantine (partial lockdown), later turned into an enhanced community quarantine in the entire Luzon (total lockdown). Among the prime time shows affected included FPJ's Ang Probinsyano, and A Soldier's Heart, which were both put on hold from March 16, 2020, until May/June 2020, The network aired reruns of some teleseryes and other programs including 100 Days to Heaven, the second of May Bukas Pa, On the Wings of Love, The Legal Wife, Got to Believe, Walang Hanggan, Wildflower, Wansapanataym, iWant Originals Series, Tubig at Langis, Your Face Sounds Familiar Kids Season 1, Pilipinas Got Talent Season 6, Bayani, Hiraya Manawari and Sine'skwela.

On May 5, 2020, ABS-CBN was issued a cease-and-desist order by the National Telecommunications Commission (NTC) and Solicitor General Jose Calida after the NTC refused to renew the network's franchise license earlier in February 2020. After meeting controversy and national outcry over the initial NTC refusal, ABS-CBN was initially allowed to operate under a temporary license, with support from both senate and congress. Investigations by various government offices showed that the company had no deficiencies or issues. There are allegations that the NTC refusal over the franchise renewal was based on the network's critical news coverage of President Rodrigo Duterte's administration. The franchise license expired on May 4, and a day later, ABS-CBN officially signed off in the evening. This was the second time the network went off-air after the declaration of martial law by Former President Ferdinand Marcos on September 23, 1972. ABS-CBN was forced to suspend operations for all of its physical broadcasting channels (with the exception of Cine Mo!, Yey!, Kapamilya Box Office (KBO) through a blocktime agreement with the AMCARA Broadcasting Network in Metro Manila, Laguna, Iloilo and some portions of Baguio and the cable channels run by the Creative Programs subsidiary of the company). The franchise was in the process of renewal, but had however been delayed due to the extension of the enhanced community quarantine to May 15, 2020, 11 days after the scheduled expiration. The network went off-air at exactly 7:52 pm (PST) of May 5.

On June 30, 2020, the NTC issued an alias cease and desist order to ABS-CBN to stop its digital TV transmission on Channel 43 in Metro Manila, as well as a cease and desist order to stop Sky Cable's direct broadcast satellite service Sky Direct.

On July 10, 2020, members of the House of Representatives, particularly the Committee on Legislative Franchises, voted 70–11 to deny the franchise application of ABS-CBN, citing several issues on the network's franchise. Only about 12.94% of the Congress voted for franchise renewal. Its President and CEO, Carlo Katigbak said the company remains committed to the public service, with hoping to find other ways to pursue their mission. According to a survey released by the Social Weather Stations or SWS that was released following the rejection of the network's franchise renewal, showed that an overwhelming majority (75%) of all Filipinos want the network back.

As a result, it was forced to cease the operations of some of its businesses and laid off its workers by the end of August. The number of people who lost their jobs was estimated at 11,000.

On September 10, the NTC issued an order to recall all frequencies assigned to it as it has no valid congressional franchise required to offer free-to-air broadcasting in the country.

Around a year and a half later on January 5, 2022, these frequencies were provisionally authorized to those on-queue for such since 2006. Advanced Media Broadcasting System (which airs its flagship TV station All TV), backed by the Villar Group through Planet Cable, was awarded the Channel 2 analog frequency and its digital counterpart Channel 16 frequency, it also later acquiring some of former ABS-CBN's regional analog and digital television stations in 2024. On January 26, Channel 23 was awarded to RPN's sister company Aliw Broadcasting Corporation, and Channel 43 was awarded to Apollo Quiboloy-owned Sonshine Media Network International, which also shut down its free-to-air operations in early 2024 due to a cease-and-desist order. On the other hand, in 2023 and 2024, its radio frequencies were assigned to the other companies and organizations including Christian Bible Baptist Church, Philippine Collective Media Corporation, and Archdiocese of Cagayan de Oro.

== 2020–present: Shifting to new media and other businesses ==
Following the rejection of their renewal broadcast franchise application, ABS-CBN shifted its focus on the line of businesses that do not require legislative franchise. These include international licensing and distribution, digital and cable platforms, content syndication via various streaming services and block-timing with various TV networks.

In an interview with ABS-CBN News chief Ging Reyes, said the media network is set in shifting its operations online and she hopes that they could continue their good performance in terms of audience engagement, being the number one news digital property in the country. Once the COVID-19 pandemic is over, ABS-CBN plans to create additional programs apart from TV Patrol and produce more online video content and rebuild ABS-CBN's current news affairs lineup in the future such as making documentaries.

Also, in a separate interview with Star Magic head Laurenti Dyogi, he said they are looking for new opportunities and that they would like to venture into international production and the prospect of going beyond the Philippine territory. ABS-CBN and Star Magic would like to be a major player locally and globally by partnering with Netflix, Amazon Prime Video, iQIYI, WeTV iflix, Viu, HBO Max, Viva One and other over-the-top platforms for their content. Back in 2019, the network co-produced with American film production company Electric Entertainment for the crime drama television series Almost Paradise. It was the network's first taste of a North American production, and a second season of the series is in the planning stage.

On June 15, 2020, ABS-CBN announced its partnership with GMMTV, a leading content company in Thailand, as it bagged the television and over-the-top rights to air eight GMMTV drama series dubbed in Filipino and was shown on Kapamilya Channel and iWantTFC. First to air was the top-trending boys' love (BL) romantic comedy, 2gether: The series. The sequel, Still 2gether, was also shown on August 15, 2020, with a one-day delayed telecast from Thailand. A stronger partnership between ABS-CBN and GMMTV is expected as they explore co-production of film and television content, music, and live entertainment. One of them is a virtual fan event called "BrightWin Manila: The Virtual Fan Meet" which was held via KTX on December 5, 2020, after the success of Hello Stranger: The Final FanCon due to the rising popularity of boys' love (BL) series during the COVID-19 pandemic. Both networks are also collaborating to co-produce a project starring one of 2gether: The series lead actors and an ABS-CBN artist under Dreamscape Entertainment. The project is currently under development.

On August 17, 2020, the drama series Ang sa Iyo ay Akin was the first original digital teleserye to be broadcast on Kapamilya Channel and Kapamilya Online Live during the time of the COVID-19 pandemic. Some of the scenes were shot in the ABS-CBN Soundstage inside the Horizon IT Park in Bulacan.

On April 13, 2021, ABS-CBN announced a collaboration with BBC and BBC Studios for the Philippine adaptation of Doctor Foster, entitled The Broken Marriage Vow.

In June 2021, ABS-CBN promoted the Netflix animated series Trese (featuring a Filipino voice cast led by Liza Soberano) by replacing temporarily the network's 2013 logo at the rooftop of ELJ Communications Center with the ABC-ZNN text, a fictional media company used in the animated series.

In August 2021, ABS-CBN has acquired the animated series based on the hit mobile game Mobile Legends: Bang Bang, entitled The Legends of Dawn: The Sacred Stone. A GMMTV drama series F4 Thailand: Boys Over Flowers is also slated to air on the network's platforms.

On May 2, 2024, Leandro Leviste, a son of former ABS-CBN News journalist and Senator Loren Legarda, acquired 8.5% stake in ABS-CBN Corporation through his company, LL Holdings, Inc., making him the second largest shareholder of the company after the Lopez group. Leviste then raised his stake in the company by 10% the following month.

On October 16, 2024, ABS-CBN Corporation announced that it had laid off 100 employees due to the continued decline of ad revenues in the TV industry, as well as the global decline of the pay TV business, which has affected the company.

On February 27, 2025, ABS-CBN announced in a disclosure to the Philippine Stock Exchange that it will sell most of the Broadcast Center to Ayala Land for redevelopment, pending regulatory approval, while retaining 1.4 hectares of the property (primarily the ELJ Communications Center) where it will consolidate its operations along with its already built soundstages, post-production and production facility at the Horizon PEZA IT Park in San Jose del Monte, Bulacan. The deal will take effect in December 2026. On August 20, 2025, ABS-CBN and Ayala Land have signed the deeds of absolute sale for the purchase of the sold properties.

In June 2025, ABS-CBN officially decided not to pursue a congressional franchise to return to traditional broadcasting, despite Congress granting the franchise. Instead, ABS-CBN will focus on content creation, partnerships and global expansions.

=== Kapamilya Channel ===
On June 4, 2020, ABS-CBN announced on TV Patrol that the cable-and-satellite Kapamilya Channel launched on June 13, serving as the interim replacement of main ABS-CBN terrestrial network, and thus resuming the production of ABS-CBN live shows and the airing its entertainment, news and current affairs programming, along with films. A high-definition counterpart was also launched on Sky Cable and Destiny Cable Channel 167 replacing the now-defunct ABS-CBN HD.

=== iWant TFC and The Filipino Channel ===
On August 24, 2020, ABS-CBN announced that they will be merging iWant and TFC Online starting September 1 and will be migrating to a new system that will be accessible worldwide and will be called iWantTFC. It offers live video streamings and video on demand of content produced by ABS-CBN, new features such as offline viewing of select movies and series, as well as an enhanced viewing experience on bigger screens through select smart TV brands and digital media players.

In early February 2021, seven TFC channels went live with Amagi cloud platform to consolidate its play-out operations on the cloud.

The Filipino Channel also launched its new and improved programming lineup with the introduction of time blocks similar to Kapamilya Channel, new shows and more viewing options while it has successfully completed its migration to high-definition in all of its international feed on February 20, 2021, which is available in iWantTFC, TFC IPTV and TFC Direct via cable and satellite.

=== Other platforms ===
On May 7, 2020, two days after the halt of ABS-CBN's TV and radio broadcast, TV Patrol announced it would continue delivering the news through ABS-CBN News official YouTube channel and Facebook page via live-stream, geo-blocked in the Philippines. This was followed by The World Tonight on July 27, 2020.

On June 13, 2020, It's Showtime: Online Ü resumed its broadcast on It's Showtime official YouTube channel and Facebook page simulcast from Kapamilya Channel.

On July 31, 2020, ABS-CBN announced the launch of Kapamilya Online Live, an online entertainment channel that will be streamed on two online video-sharing platforms without any subscription fee. It began to stream on August 1, 2020, and is available both on ABS-CBN Entertainment's YouTube channel and Facebook page as the network shifts efforts to digital platforms. Live-streams are presented in 1080p HD format. It also starts to offer a video on demand service of its shows accessible for seven days after their original streaming date. ABS-CBN Entertainment currently has more than 60 million followers combined in Facebook and YouTube.

Aside from Kapamilya Online Live, selected ABS-CBN shows are independently live-streaming on several YouTube channels and Facebook pages owned by the network.

Launched in August 2020, KTX also known as Kapamilya Tickets is an online ticketing and streaming platform which enables its users to purchase tickets to advance screening of ABS-CBN shows, movies, digital concerts and other event production attractions, as well as avail tickets to ABS-CBN programs to be part of their virtual audience via Zoom. Continuing its digital shift, ABS-CBN is turning to digital events through KTX while big live events are prohibited during the COVID-19 pandemic. It held its first digital fan conference that marked the finale of the BL series Hello Stranger which later was shown on Kapamilya Online Live and TFC. Originally launched in May 2017, KTX used to be a ticketing portal for ABS-CBN Studio Tour to shows such as It's Showtime and ASAP Natin 'To before the pandemic lockdown. Most notable digital shows handled by KTX include Miss Universe Philippines 2020, The Fact Music Awards 2020, BrightWin Manila: The Virtual Fan Meet, Freedom: Regine Velasquez-Alcasid Digital Concert and Sarah Geronimo Tala: The Film Concert. A new revamp on its web user interface was launched on March 30, 2021.

In October 2020, ABS-CBN partnered with Kumu to launch the ninth season of reality TV show Pinoy Big Brother: Connect amid the COVID-19 pandemic. The app hosted online auditions for the reality show, which attracted over 100,000 new users, and it also live-streamed activities inside the Big Brother House when the show premiered. The partnership between the two parties entails greater visibility for ABS-CBN's artists and talents outside of mainstream media, with Kumu providing an alternative channel for said artists to connect with their large fan bases locally. It's currently live-streaming Game Ka Na Ba?, the first game show in the world to be watched on television and played on a mobile app, separate channels for FYE, MOR Entertainment, Myx, SeenZone as well as artist from BGYO, BINI, MNL48, Star Magic, Star Hunt, Polaris, Star Music and Rise Artist Studio.

On November 11, 2020, ABS-CBN announced that viewers worldwide will have free access to TV Patrol on ABS-CBN News YouTube and Facebook account, lifting the geo-blocking to the said show while local viewers will also be able to live-stream and catch up on episodes of various ANC and TeleRadyo shows for the first time. ABS-CBN News completely lifted the use of geo-blocking to all of its content on March 1, 2021.

The ABS-CBN Radio Service is an app that let its users to have access to the exclusive news, talk and music content directly from their mobile device no matter where they are located in the world. It live-streams audio from Teleradyo and the most recently added MOR Entertainment and MyxRadio while latest podcast from selected ABS-CBN News and ANC programs such as TV Patrol are available on demand. The said app is part of ABS-CBN Digital Media division in partnership with Zeno Media and is currently available on iOS and Android devices free of charge.

=== Partnership agreements ===
==== Agreement deals with other networks ====
On October 6, 2020, ABS-CBN Corporation announced that they would air its shows and movies back on Free TV via the new "A2Z" channel on October 10. It is a blocktime agreement (later entered as airtime lease agreement on May 30, 2022) between the media company and ZOE Broadcasting Network. A month later, Minority Leader and Congressman Joseph Stephen Paduano of Abang Lingkod Party List called for an investigation into the ABS-CBN-A2Z Channel 11 blocktime deal. The National Telecommunications Commission (NTC) and Bureau of Internal Revenue (BIR) were told to investigate.

On January 18, 2021, ABS-CBN Corporation and TV5 Network, Inc. were allegedly doing a partnership agreement to further expand the reach of Kapamilya Network on Free TV. There are some possible results that most of ABS-CBN shows and programs that were not able to be broadcast on ABS-CBN and ZOE's A2Z would be aired on TV5.

On January 21, 2021, ABS-CBN jointly announced with TV5 and Cignal TV, in conjunction with Brightlight Productions, that both ASAP and the FPJ: Da King movie block debuted on the Kapatid network's lineup every Sunday afternoon on January 24. This also marks the first time that ABS-CBN programs would be aired on free-to-air television nationwide since the May 5, 2020 shutdown. Despite this development, both programs continued to air on Kapamilya Channel, Kapamilya Online Live (except FPJ: Da King), and A2Z. It also marked the start of ABS-CBN's collaboration with other networks that allowed their artists to appear and work for them secondarily.

On March 5, 2021, ABS-CBN and TV5/Cignal announced that TV5 would also simulcast the ABS-CBN's primetime lineup programs on March 8.

On April 5, 2022, ABS-CBN and GMA Network, Inc. forged a partnership that will bring Star Cinema movies to GMA's local channels, beginning the former's collaboration with GMA.

On April 6, 2022, ABS-CBN jointly announced with Broadcast Enterprises and Affiliated Media to launch its TV channel "PIE" in partnership with the conglomerate, Kroma Entertainment and 917Ventures.

In June 2022, ABS-CBN engaged into advanced talks with TV5's parent company, MediaQuest Holdings to allow its resources combined after Villar Group-backed Advanced Media Broadcasting System acquired ABS-CBN's former frequency, and began operations on September 13 as All TV-2, a flagship station of All TV. On August 10, 2022, ABS-CBN and MediaQuest Holdings signed a "convertible note agreement" as announced on the following day for the ABS-CBN's investment into TV5 Network by acquiring 34.99% of the company's common shares, with an option to increase it stake to 49.92% within the next eight years with MediaQuest remained as the TV5's controlling shareholder with 64.79% of TV5's common shares. Meanwhile, MediaQuest Holdings executed a "debt instruments agreement" by acquiring a 38.88% minority stake of ABS-CBN's cable TV arm Sky Cable Corporation through Cignal TV, with an option to acquire an additional 61.12% of Sky Cable shares within the next eight years. On August 16, the House of Representatives originally schedule a briefing on the investment of ABS-CBN and TV5 deal on August 18, however, it was silently cancelled on the following day. On August 24, the two broadcasting companies agreed to pause their closing preparations for the deal following concerns from politicians and some government agencies. However, the agreement was terminated on September 1.

In September 2022, ABS-CBN and Advanced Media Broadcasting System announced that All TV would air the reruns of their respective drama series on September 14, apart from the original programs.

On May 23, 2023, ABS-CBN announced in a press release that the company will enter into a joint venture agreement with Prime Media Holdings, Inc, owned by House Speaker Representative Martin Romualdez. Among the plans for ABS-CBN and Prime Media joint venture is the possible revival of DZMM on its frequency 630 kHz. 630 kHz conducted a test broadcast on June 26, 2023, under the DWPM callsign, it had its soft launch on June 30 as Radyo 630 and officially launched on July 17. The frequency is owned by Philippine Collective Media Corporation and operated by Media Serbisyo Production Corporation, a joint venture between Prime Media Holdings (through its indirect subsidiary Philippine Collective Media Corporation) and ABS-CBN Corporation.

On June 20, 2023, ABS-CBN jointly announced with Citynet Network Marketing and Productions Inc. (a subsidiary of GMA Network Inc.), that It's Showtime will be simulcasted on GTV on July 1.

On March 20, 2024, ABS-CBN jointly announced with GMA Network, that It's Showtime will be simulcasted on the Kapuso network's noontime slot replacing the short-lived TAPE Inc.-produced noontime variety show Tahanang Pinakamasaya.

On April 11, 2024, ABS-CBN jointly announced with Advanced Media Broadcasting System, that the Kapamilya Channel broadcast feed to be known as Kapamilya Channel sa ALLTV2 (later ABS-CBN sa ALLTV2 or ABS-CBN | ALLTV2 from February 2026), which including TV Patrol and It's Showtime along with programs from Jeepney TV, as well as Magandang Buhay, will be aired on All TV from April 15, 2024. This marked the return of ABS-CBN on channels 2 and 16 in Manila (and subsequently to other regional channels), frequencies previously held by the said content provider after four years. The content partnership (later brand licensing) agreement between ABS-CBN and AMBS was formalized after both companies signed on April 23, 2024, which took effect on May 13, 2024. The brand were originally shown separately from April 2024 to January 1, 2026, with ALLTV was the channel identifier and Kapamilya Channel for its 2020–2026 silent break bumper of the latter (which continued to be used until March 16, 2026) during commercial breaks. Kapamilya Channel's airtime to the network was then extended on January 2, 2026, when new ABS-CBN contents on TV5 stopped airing on January 1 which merged both brands.

On May 27, 2024, ABS-CBN and Prime Media Holdings announced that TeleRadyo Serbisyo programs along with TV Patrol and TV Patrol Weekend will be simulcasted on PRTV Prime Media.

On January 28, 2025, ABS-CBN and GMA Network announced that they would bringing the collaboration for 20th Anniversary of Pinoy Big Brother as a Celebrity Collab Edition.

On May 29, 2025, ABS-CBN, Prime Media and PCMC announced that DWPM Radyo 630 and Teleradyo Serbisyo reverts to its previous branding, DZMM Radyo Patrol 630 along with the branding return of its television counterpart as DZMM TeleRadyo after 5 years of hiatus.

On December 4, 2025, ABS-CBN and TV5 announced the airing of newly released ABS-CBN contents will be on hiatus from January 2 until June 21, 2026.

From February to March 16, 2026, ABS-CBN consolidated its broadcast platforms Kapamilya Channel, Kapamilya Online Live, and ALLTV by having its 2013 logo to be used on them. This adapted the name on-air as ABS-CBN | Kapamilya Channel, ABS-CBN | Kapamilya Online Live, and ABS-CBN sa ALLTV2 or ABS-CBN | ALLTV2 and changed the respective silent bumpers during commercial breaks on March 16. As such, their previous versions of the bumpers for ALLTV2 was used until March 15, 2026, and Kapamilya Channel and Kapamilya Online Live until March 16, 2026). This is to coincide with the 80th original founding and 40th of re-establishment following the People Power Revolution anniversaries of ABS-CBN as a media company.

==== Streaming partnerships ====
On March 18, 2021, ABS-CBN and WeTV iflix announced a landmark partnership that brings the Kapamilya network's primetime programs, including FPJ's Ang Probinsyano to the two streaming platforms starting March 20, with early access for subscribed users. Viewers can watch brand new series first as it premieres on WeTV and iflix VIP 46 hours before it airs on local TV.

On October 11, 2021, during the 26th Busan International Film Festival, iQIYI partnered with ABS-CBN to release two Philippine series exclusively on the streaming platform later this year. It is considered to be their first local originals in Southeast Asia.

On January 15, 2022, they launched on Viu with partnered on ABS-CBN to release a hit adaptation The Broken Marriage Vow starting on January 22, 2022, on the 48 Hours Free TV Broadcast. On January 23, 2023, a historic collab between ABS-CBN and GMA Network has been announced and will release their first series Unbreak My Heart and will be streamed on Viu in 15 international territories in 2023.

On February 7, 2022, ABS-CBN and YouTube announced its partnership to develop and produce a new original series that will stream exclusively on the video-streaming platform. Based on the co-production deal, ABS-CBN will develop a romantic-comedy series called How to Move On in 30 Days which will premiere the same year.

On April 19, 2022, ABS-CBN and Netflix closed a groundbreaking simulcast deal wherein 2 Good 2 Be True have an exclusive 72-hour window on the global streaming platform before its episodes aired on television.

In October 2022, Warner Bros. Discovery (WBD) announced an agreement with ABS-CBN to license lifestyle programming from its pay television channel Metro Channel in Central and Southeast Asia, with distribution via Discovery+, Discovery Asia, and Asian Food Network.

== ABS-CBN Regional ==
ABS-CBN Regional
- Type: Division
- Industry: Broadcast television; Radio broadcasting
- Predecessor: ABS-CBN Regional News Group
- Founded: August 29, 1988; 38 years ago (as broadcast network); January 25, 2025; 21 months ago (as content provider)
- Defunct: August 28, 2020; 6 years ago (as broadcast network)
- Fate: List: Free-to-air broadcast had ceased after the network's franchise was lapsed on May 5, 2020 with its broadcast franchise revoked on July 10, 2020; Selected TV frequencies are acquired by, and transmitters are leased to and subsequently acquired by Advanced Media Broadcasting System and ZOE Broadcasting Network; Selected radio frequencies are acquired by Philippine Collective Media Corporation and Radyo Pilipino Corporation
- Key people: Veneranda Sy
- Parent: ABS-CBN Corporation

ABS-CBN Regional (formerly ABS-CBN Regional Network Group) is a media and content company. It was the regional network division of ABS-CBN and was responsible for simultaneously airing most of the shows seen on ABS-CBN's flagship station in the provinces, with all stations (including Cebu, Bacolod and Davao) reopening in 1988 after suspension due to martial law enacted in September 1972. Manila's flagship station reopened after the People Power Revolution in September 1986. ABS-CBN Regional had several stations in each region outside Mega Manila to ensure nationwide coverage.

The local stations also produced their own newscasts which air prior to TV Patrol and another local programming which air on Sundays. The launch of the local game show Kapamilya Winner Ka! (now renamed as Kapamilya, Mas Winner Ka!) in the Visayas and Mindanao, Bagong Morning Kapamilya in North Luzon (Baguio and Dagupan), the 17th local TV Patrol in Southern Tagalog (Region IV-A), and the 18th local TV Patrol in Palawan (IV-B; the network had an affiliate station) provided more relevance to regional audiences.

On April 15, 2011, Regional launched Choose Philippines, a new website promoting tourism in the Philippines by sharing photos and stories of the most extravagant places, culture and arts.

ABS-CBN Regional ceased its operations on August 28, 2020, after almost 32 years after the denial of its legislative franchise on July 10. Currently, some of ABS-CBN Regional's TV frequencies are acquired by now-affiliates Advanced Media Broadcasting System and ZOE Broadcasting Network for its networks All TV and A2Z respectively (with ABS-CBN's transmitter equipment for its former frequencies now being leased to and subsequently acquired by the aforementioned).

In late 2022, ABS-CBN Regional gradually resumed operations as a sales and marketing arm, primarily promoting ABS-CBN programs aired on various free-to-air channels with which it has agreements, such as A2Z, All TV, GMA Network, GTV and TV5. Additionally, they restarted hosting regional events featuring ABS-CBN talents and personalities after years of hiatus due to the pandemic.

In January 2025, ABS-CBN Regional had returned to content production, launching its first post-shutdown weekly local magazine show, Bisaya Ni, and free-to-air broadcast of MOR Entertainment-produced Dear MOR. Both programs air on A2Z's Cebu station and its sister stations across the Visayas and Mindanao. On October 28, 2025, it announced the revival of TV Patrol Regional on November 2 as a digital-only weekly program focusing on news in the Visayas area and to be delivered on Cebuano language. On November 16, 2025, the newscast started airing on TV via A2Z and Kapamilya Channel, marking its return to television after 5 years.

== Digital transition ==
=== Digital terrestrial television ===
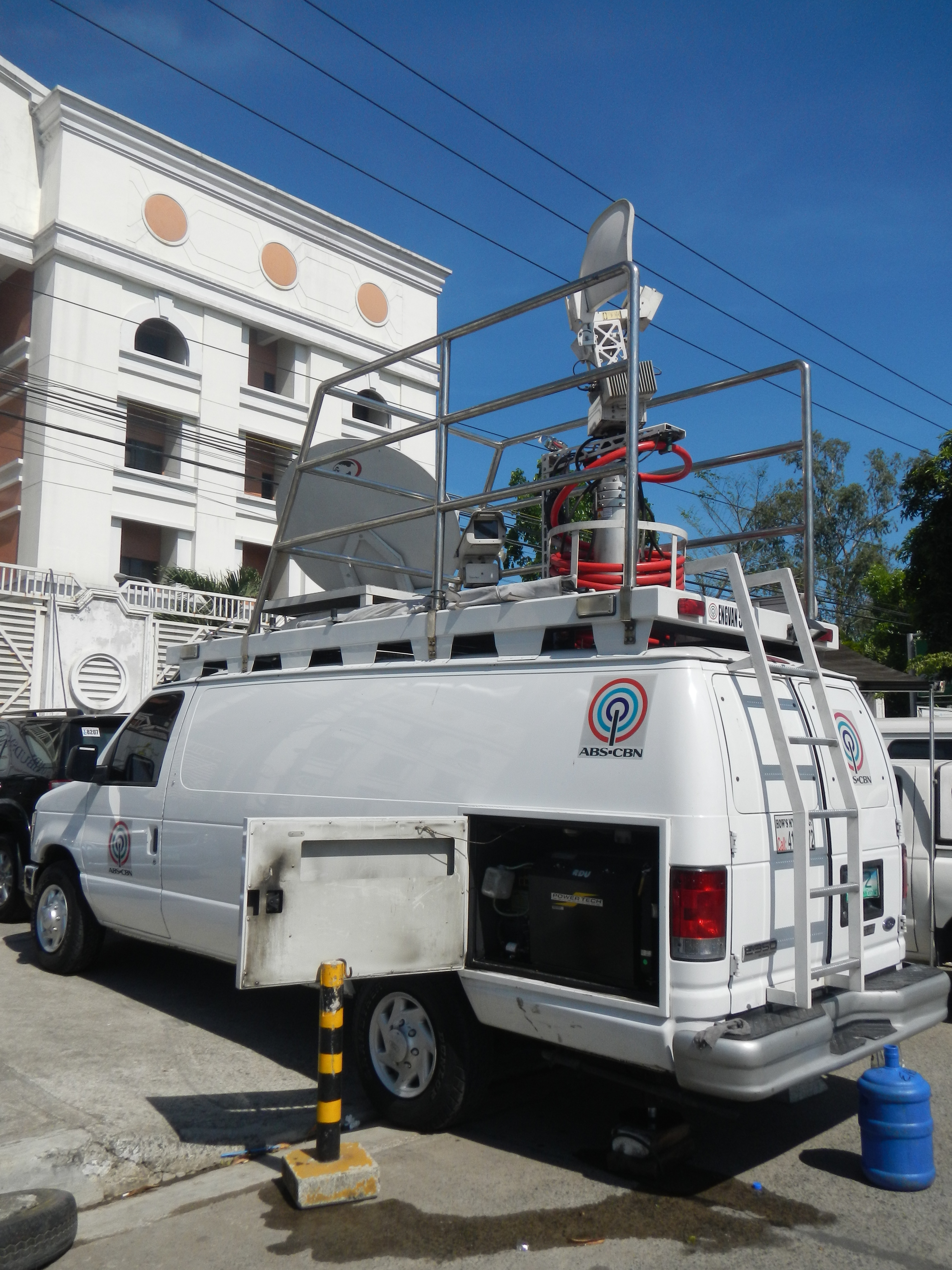
An ABS-CBN news van in front of the Office of the Ombudsman building

ABS-CBN Corporation initially applied for a license from the National Telecommunications Commission to operate a digital terrestrial television service in the country back in 2007. ABS-CBN planned to utilize multiplex to offer ABS-CBN, Studio 23/S+A, and 5 additional specialty TV channels. The conglomerate was expected to spend at least 1 billion pesos annually for the next 5 years for its DTT transition. ABS-CBN utilized UHF channel 51 Manila (695.143 MHz), later UHF Channel 43 (647.143 MHz), for test broadcasts in the DVB-T format. ABS-CBN was expected to begin digital test broadcasts in January 2009.

In June 2010, the NTC announced that it would formally adopt the Japanese standard ISDB-T for digital broadcasting and issued a circular commanding all the country's television networks to switch-off their analog services on December 31, 2015, at 11:59 p.m. Philippine Standard Time (UTC+8). But due to delay of the release of the implementing rules and regulations for digital television broadcast, the target date was moved to 2023.

In April 2011, the company announced further details about its DTT plans, which would offer ABS-CBN andStudio 23 (later S+A from 2014 to 2020). In addition, four new channels which will be exclusively available to its digital users will be offered once the digital broadcast start. The specialty TV channel lineup will include one news channel, one youth-oriented channel, an educational channel, and a movie channel. The conglomerate was also planning to utilize the 1seg (one segment) broadcast standard for handheld devices.

In September 2014, ABS-CBN soft-launched its DTT service started selling ISDB-T receivers in selected barangays in Metro Manila under Sky TV+ brand. Later, it was rebranded as ABS-CBN TVplus.

On February 11, 2015, ABS-CBN formally launched its DTT service under the name ABS-CBN TVplus in a formal switch-over ceremony held at the ABS-CBN Broadcasting Center. The ABS-CBN TVplus service has four exclusive TV channels which are free of charge; these are movie channel Cine Mo!, news channel DZMM TeleRadyo, educational channel Knowledge Channel, and kids channel Yey!. In addition to ABS-CBN and S+A, all non-encrypted digital terrestrial broadcast within the area was also carried by the service. ABS-CBN TVplus also provides pay per view, EWBS, and BML services. As of February 2020, ABS-CBN TVplus has sold over 9 million units of its set-top boxes.

=== High-definition television, and modernization of broadcast facilities and contents ===
ABS-CBN HD was a Philippine pay television channel, working as the high-definition feed of ABS-CBN. It was launched on October 3, 2015, initially on Sky Cable and Destiny Cable and later on iWant (now iWantTFC), Sky On Demand, and Sky Direct, broadcasting in 1080i at a frame rate of 50 fps (via Sky Direct) or at 60fps. The network including its HD feed dissolved on May 5, 2020, at 7:52 pm following TV Patrol. It was replaced by Kapamilya Channel HD on June 13, 2020.

In 2007, ABS-CBN began producing contents in high-definition. This was Rounin, a science fiction, fantasy series created by Erik Matti. This was followed by ABS-CBN's drama anthology Maalaala Mo Kaya from 2008 to 2022 and 2025 (with the episodes being letterboxed if aired on standard definition television (SDTV)). The network's first Christmas station ID to be produced in high definition is the 2010–2011's Ngayong Pasko Magniningning ang Pilipino from November 4, 2010, to January 2011. The second ABS-CBN series to be produced in HD is Budoy in 2011. Prior to this, big-budget series like Esperanza, Mula sa Puso, Pangako Sa 'Yo, and Kay Tagal Kang Hinintay were shot in 16mm film with a 4:3 aspect ratios while low budget series, on the other hand, were shot in smaller formats. The network's last drama series to be produced in 4:3 aspect ratio is Moon of Desire which aired from March 31 to August 15, 2014, while the last program overall to be produced and aired on a said aspect ratio are the ABS-CBN News and Current Affairs programs such as Umagang Kay Ganda, TV Patrol, and Bandila where they were switched to high definition (1080i, 16:9 HDTV) format on April 2, 2018. Beginning with Sana Bukas pa ang Kahapon on June 16, 2014, all of ABS-CBN's TV series were all produced in high-definition format. Ningning was the first Filipino TV series to be broadcast in HD on October 5, 2015, while Maalaala Mo Kaya was the first mini-series to do so the day before. On the other hand, the first ever locally produced live entertainment program to be broadcast in HD was the musical variety show ASAP on October 4, 2015. The aspect ratio of the network's break bumper was changed from 4:3 to 16:9 on June 13, 2016. Overall, TV broadcast contents on ABS-CBN in 4:3 aspect ratio were originally aired and produced until April 1, 2018. Since April 2, 2018, broadcast contents on ABS-CBN are now all in 16:9 aspect ratio thus the network phased out the production of contents in 4:3 ratio on the said date.

In 2008, ABS-CBN began moving to a fully tapeless workflow and since then, the network has digitalized all areas of its production. ABS-CBN eventually completed its plan to upgrade its studios facilities from SD definition to HD definition for the ad play out in September 2010. The increasing demand of high-impact HD commercial content from their clients and audiences pushed ABS-CBN to definitely setting up the ad play out of more than 20 cable TV channels with Etere MTX system. MTX system is used as a quick content player with fast access to all video commercials, able to play multiple formats with no conversion. The network moves to MTX in April 2013, as it is planning a refurbishment of its regional stations across the country that will include an Enterprise MAM video exchange based on Etere technologies. ABS-CBN has a plan to refurbish and innovate all its regional stations to allow their playout systems to be synchronized with the main playout facility. The 1st installation is performed in Dagupan and the project is expected to be completed in 2 years. ABS-CBN's regional stations are mainly running low-cost, low performance hardware and software, far away from broadcast affordability and performances. In order to achieve this goal, the network will extend their Etere systems to all the regional stations. The playout and video management system will be based on MTX, with a pure “software only” approach, all the traditional video hardware is replaced by software, including master switcher and logo generator.

On April 19, 2009, Sony announced the acquisition of ABS-CBN of 24 units of its Sony high-definition professional video cameras through a press release published on Sony's official website. On July 11, 2009, ABS-CBN launched a high definition feed of Balls (later S+A HD after the former's closure from 2016 to 2020) in SkyCable under the name Balls HD, the first local high-definition TV channel in the history of Philippine television. On the same day, Balls HD broadcast the first locally produced coverage of an event in high-definition, the UAAP Season 72 basketball game which was produced by ABS-CBN Sports. In addition, two of its three news helicopters are capable of transmitting high-definition live feeds from its 5 axis gimbal HD camera mounted on the aircraft.

On April 20, 2010, Ikegami, a Japanese manufacturer of professional and broadcast television equipment announced the acquisition of ABS-CBN of 75 units of Ikegami high-definition professional video cameras for electronic newsgathering.

In 2014, ABS-CBN replaced its 1986 broadcast playout or master control with black transition screen except the break bumper followed by the first program teaser with the current 2014 one without transition in between advertisements and teasers by replacing the master controls as part of a modernization of the network's broadcast facilities. The first few months of this upgrade still had the advertisements after the show's title card that is shown when the program pauses then the break bumper for the program teasers and show's resume although without the black screen transition. As a result of the 2014 upgrade, the network's broadcasting format has also been changed on late August 2014 by having the bumper and teasers now shown after the program pauses and before the advertisements. This change have been carried on main ABS-CBN terrestrial channel's successors Kapamilya Channel, and later A2Z and ALLTV since April 17, 2022 and April 15, 2024, respectively, and if connecting to the main ABS-CBN/Kapamilya Channel playout (both ABS-CBN and A2Z-produced shows). A2Z also if not connected to the main feed since the said date of April 2022, TV5 from January 24, 2021 to January 1, 2026 and since June 24, 2026, and GMA Network (for It's Showtime only) since April 6, 2024, however, still have a bumper shown after the advertisements like the older 1986–2014 ABS-CBN playout although still without the black transition in between.

On October 3, 2015, ABS-CBN launched a high-definition feed in Sky Cable and Destiny Cable under the name ABS-CBN HD. This marked the Philippines' first commercial television network to be launched in high-definition. The said channel will broadcast selected shows of ABS-CBN in a true high-definition picture while the remaining shows will be broadcast in upscaled standard definition picture with pillarbox to preserve its original 4:3 aspect ratio. ABS-CBN HD was also made available on Sky Direct, iWant, and Sky On Demand.

On May 5, 2020, ABS-CBN HD dissolved its operations, together with its SD feed and other ABS-CBN's free TV and radio stations, following the cease-and-desist order from the National Telecommunications Commission after its legislative franchise expired on May 4.

=== Tapeless ===
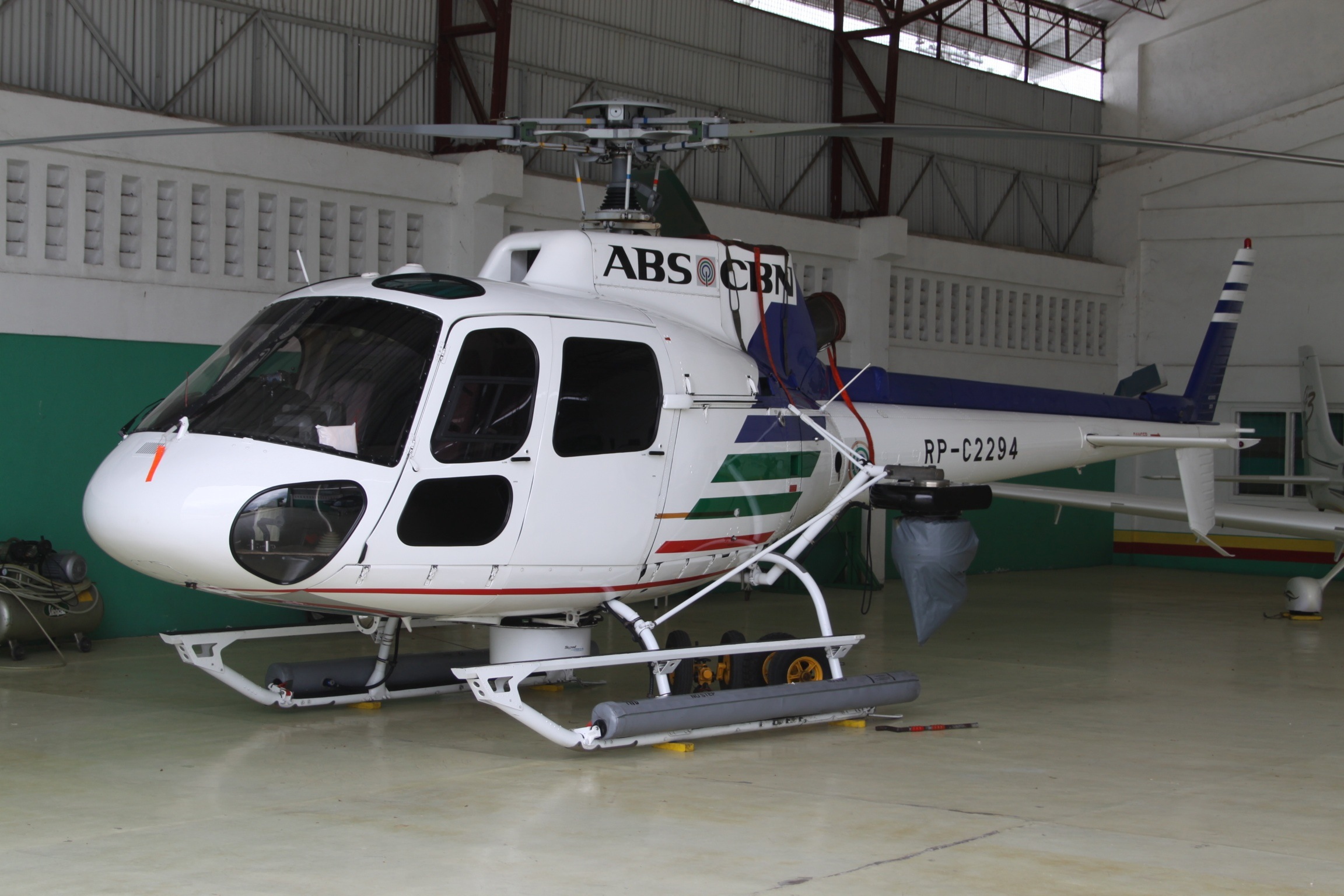
One of the three Eurocopter AS350 Écureuil news helicopters of ABS-CBN in a hangar in Mactan–Cebu International Airport mounted with a five-axis gimbal HD camera

In 2007, in preparation for digital and high-definition television broadcasting, ABS-CBN acquired server and post-production technologies developed by EVS Broadcast Equipment, making ABS-CBN the first broadcaster in Southeast Asia to go tapeless. EVS provided ABS-CBN a 100 percent digital and non-linear editing system andpost-production workflow as well as wireless access through a media access management system servers installed in outside broadcasting van. This will be integrated to technologies developed by Avid Technology, Snell, and Ruckus Wireless.

=== Digital archiving ===
ABS-CBN started digitizing its film and television content in 2004. Further expansions both locally and globally started in 2008 with the integration of its playlist import. In 2010, ABS-CBN started to replace SeaChange International servers with Harmonic Inc. and Etere managing a multi-server, multi-channel system; they also started the HD playout using the Channel in a box technology of Etere MTX.

In 2007, ABS-CBN acquired a Media Asset Management System (MAMS) from IBM Corporation for a cost of US$4 million. The IBM MAMS includes a hardware infrastructure support and 2 petabytes (2000 terabytes) of data storage that was expected to grow by 36 percent over the next few years as ABS-CBN was already generating over 700 hours of content a month. The MAMS will be integrated to the million dollar Dalet Digital Media Systems and Avid Unity ISIS (Infinitely Scalable Intelligent Storage) that will enable ABS-CBN to digitize and store its over 200,000 hours of television content and its library of over 2000 films. As of 2016, ABS-CBN Film Archives, in partnership with Central Digital Lab, Inc., has digitized, restored, and remastered over 100 films which includes classics such as Himala, Oro, Plata, Mata, and Ganito Kami Noon... Paano Kayo Ngayon?.
