= Dolphy Theatre =

Theatre in Quezon City, Philippines

Coordinates: 14°38′21″N 121°02′13″E

Dolphy Theatre (formerly ABS-CBN Studio 1) is a proscenium theatre adjacent in the ABS-CBN Broadcasting Center in Quezon City, Philippines. It was named in honor of Filipino comedian Dolphy in celebration of his 80th birthday in 2008. It is one of the oldest studios of the Broadcast Center which was used as a newsroom in 1986 when the network re-opened.

The theatre is used by Star Magic. Press conferences, award nights and other events are also held in the venue.

On February 27, 2025, ABS-CBN announced in a disclosure to the Philippine Stock Exchange that it will sell most of the Broadcast Center to Ayala Land for redevelopment, pending regulatory approval, while retaining 1.4 hectares of the property (primarily the ELJ Communications Center) where it will consolidate its operations along with its already built soundstages, post-production and production facility at the Horizon PEZA IT Park in San Jose del Monte, Bulacan. Dolphy Theatre is among the studios included in the sale. The deal will take effect in December 2026. On August 20, 2025, ABS-CBN and Ayala Land have signed the deeds of absolute sale for the purchase of the sold properties.

== Programs that used the Dolphy Theatre ==
=== Film/Series premiere ===
- Love Is Color Blind (2021)
- BINI & BGYO Dubai Adventures: A Docufilm (2022)
- Beach Bros (2022)

=== Concerts & awards events ===
- Gawad Geny Lopez Jr. Bayaning Pilipino Awards (1996–present)
- ABS-CBN Philharmonic Orchestra Concert (2012–present)
- Kalokalike Grand Parade Of Stars (2013–2014)
- 38th PMPC Star Awards for Television (2025)

=== Funerals ===
- Angelo Castro Jr.'s Necrological Services (2012)
- Dolphy's Necrological Mass (2012)
- Lito Balquiedra, Jr.'s Necrological Services (2012)
- Wenn V. Deramas' Necrological Services (March 5, 2016)

=== Programming use ===
- ABS-CBN Sunday TV Mass (1986–2006)
- ASAP (1996)
- Afternoon Delight (1988–1989)
- Citizen Pinoy
- Eat Bulaga! (1989–1994)
- Happy Yipee Yehey! (2012)
- I-Shine Talent Camp (2014)
- I Love OPM (2016)
- Showtime (2010)
- Kalatog Pinggan (1987–1988)
- Magandang Tanghali Bayan (2002)
- MTB: Ang Saya Saya (2005)
- Magandang Gabi Bayan (1998)
- Oras ng Ligaya (1968–1972)
- Pilipinas Got Talent (2010)
- Pinoy Big Brother: Gen 11 (2024)
- Pinoy Boyband Superstar (2016)
- Sa Linggo nAPO Sila (1992)
- Sharon (2010)
- Star Circle Quest (2004–2005)
- Star Power (2010–2011)
- Star Hunt: The Grand Audition Show (2018)
- Stop, Look, and Listen (1968–1972)
- Superstar (KBS/RPN, 1973–1978)
- Tawag ng Tanghalan (2016)
- The Healing Eucharist (2006–2010, 2019)
- The Sharon Cuneta Show (1988–1997, occasionally venue for Sharon Cuneta's Birthday and TSCS anniversary special)
- The Voice Kids (2014)
- The X Factor Philippines (2012)
- We Love OPM (2016)
- Wowowee (2006)
- Your Face Sounds Familiar (2015)
- Your Face Sounds Familiar Kids (2017)
- Your Moment (2019)
