= Channel in a box =

Broadcast television equipment

Channel in a box is the name given to an all-in-one playout device for broadcast television. Commonly based on a standard PC, it includes the ability to store content immediately required, add graphics, and deliver it to a transmission chain. Thus it provides an integrated, software playout platform.

== History ==
A television channel's output consists of programs, commercials, trailers, promos and public service information. This is delivered in a seamless, continuous stream, cutting between sources at frame accuracy, known as channel playout.

Since the late 1980s there has been a move to automate playout, with commercial products reaching the market in the 1990s. The first broadcasters to move to automated playout are generally considered to be the UK's Channel 4 and its Welsh equivalent, S4C.

These systems used traditional broadcast hardware, including switches, graphics devices and robotic tape players, under the control of a hybrid computer network including PCs for monitoring and control, and special real-time processors to trigger events.

Robotic tape players were replaced by video servers. While digital disk recorders were around from the mid-90s.

As Moore's law continued to increase the processing power of standard computers, so developers looked to move all standard playout functionality to a single device, which rapidly became known as a channel in a box.

== Production and philosophy ==
The relatively compact size of the broadcast industry and the specialised nature of video and audio processing has meant that, for most of the history of television, delivering the performance required has demanded unique hardware. Because the development costs of this technology are amortised over a small number of unit sales, prices are inevitably high.

As IT hardware has improved in performance, so broadcast vendors have moved more processing onto standard platforms. The development of open standards like the SMPTE ST 2110 family has meant that video systems and complete solutions can communicate over IP rather than bespoke broadcast transports like SDI.

These two factors combine to significantly reduce the cost of equipment while maintaining the highest quality. As well as boosting broadcast economics, the low cost and simplicity has meant that non-broadcast applications, like sports clubs, churches and community groups can also benefit.

== Benefits ==
Integrated playout, or channel in a box, is a software application, today running on a standard desktop computer workstation. It will have the capability to edit and manage the playlist for a TV channel – the list of events which make up the output – and call up the elements from local storage. It will switch seamlessly between them, and add graphics as necessary.

As such, it can be completely self-contained. Typically, though, it will interface with video storage systems and media asset management to cache the content immediately required. It may interface with a separate scheduling and planning system.

Many installations will transmit multiple channels, so each channel-in-a-box will be working in collaboration with the others, to avoid network bottlenecks by timing large data transfers.

A channel in a box is typically a single standalone desktop computer. For broadcast applications they are normally housed in a 1U rack cabinet. This replaces significantly larger cabinets required for master control switchers, routers, graphics devices and other equipment. So, along with reduced capital costs, there is a continuing saving in total cost of operation by requiring significantly less rack space than a traditional system using legacy hardware. The integrated playout system will also use very much less energy, and in turn will require less air conditioning.

Because it is an integrated system from a single vendor, the channel in a box is perceived as simpler to implement, maintain and support. Continuing advances in PC power and operating systems mean that software systems benefit from more frequent upgrades and performance enhancement than the traditional broadcast seven to 10-year capital investment cycle.
