= ABS-CBN Soundstage =

Studio and production facility in Bulacan, Philippines

ABS-CBN (Horizon IT Park)
- Interactive map of the ABS-CBN (Horizon IT Park) area
- Alternative names: Horizon IT Park

General information
- Status: Operational (Parts of the area are still unfinished, including the second soundstage and the rest of Horizon IT Park)
- Type: Studio, soundstage, broadcasting, production facility, back lots, storage, visitors center, post production facility, offices, support building
- Architectural style: Modern
- Location: Igay Road, San Jose del Monte, Bulacan, Philippines
- Coordinates: 14°48′25.7″N 121°05′12.5″E
- Current tenants: ABS-CBN Studios (Entertainment division); ABS-CBN Films (Film production division)
- Construction started: May 2017 (Phase 1A; the second soundstage under Phase 1B is still under construction)
- Construction stopped: December 2018 (Phase 1A) (Parts of the area are still unfinished, including the second soundstage and the rest of Horizon IT Park)
- Opening: December 12, 2018 (Phase 1A)
- Inaugurated: December 12, 2018 (Phase 1A)
- Cost: ₱ 700 Million (Estimated for Phase 1A) ₱ 6 to 7.5 Billion (Horizon IT Park with 10 Soundstages, projected)
- Owner: ABS-CBN Corporation
- Landlord: ABS-CBN Studios, Inc.

Height
- Height: 30 ft (9.1 m)

Technical details
- Floor count: 2 floors (support building; first floor is the mezzanine floor and second floor is the elevation floor)
- Floor area: 1,500 m (4,900 ft)
- Grounds: 7.7 hectares (19 acres)

Design and construction
- Architecture firm: Bastien and Associates (California), AIDEA (Philippines), with consultants from Hollywood-based Manhattan Beach Studios
- Other designers: Manhattan Beach Studios (Consultants)

Other information
- Number of rooms: 40 rooms (support building; including restrooms, wardrobes and offices and facilities. Some still unassigned as of 2018)

The ABS-CBN Soundstage at the Horizon IT Park, San Jose del Monte, Bulacan, is the main production facility of ABS-CBN. It is owned by ABS-CBN Corporation, and operated and managed by its division ABS-CBN Studios, Inc.

Although the original plan is to have a total of 10 soundstages with 2 stages each, only 1 soundstage with 2 stages have been completed as of 2018. No announcements have been made as of 2021 regarding the construction of the other soundstages.

The area also includes parking spaces, storage, visitors center, offices and other facilities. The cost of the project is estimated to be between ₱6 and 7.5 billion.

== History ==
On June 16, 2011, ABS-CBN announced its plans to develop a state-of-the-art studio complex. It would, as they claim, enable the network to produce Hollywood-caliber programs in a more cost-effective manner. A 15-hectare (37-acre) property acquired by the company in Novaliches, Quezon City was the originally planned site for the complex but it would later be moved to a 7.7-hectare (19-acre) land in San Jose del Monte, Bulacan.

Before the end of 2013, ABS-CBN announced it would raise ₱5 billion the following year to finance the construction. The project officially kicked off on the first quarter of 2014, but construction would not commence until May 2017. The first phase of the complex, designed by California-based architecture firm Bastien and Associates in collaboration with a Filipino firm AIDEA, includes two soundstages, each housing two stages and occupying an area of 1,500 m^{2} (16,000 sq ft).

Parallel to the construction, production and support teams for TV and film started a three-year training to learn how to operate the sound stages and ensure that production processes mirror the best practices in the world. The training, which involved 150 people, was designed by Manhattan Beach Studios, ABS-CBN Studios Inc., and ABS-CBN University.

On December 12, 2018, ABS-CBN inaugurated the new state-of-the-art studio complex and its name, Horizon IT Park, was unveiled. This date is significant because it marks the 65th anniversary of ABS-CBN Television, 25th anniversary of Star Cinema, and was only a few days shy from the 50th anniversary of the inauguration of the main ABS-CBN Broadcast Center in Quezon City which was considered the most advanced facility in Asia when it opened on December 18, 1968.

== Status ==
Only the first of the two planned soundstages for Phase 1 was finished. This consequently became known as Phase 1A, with the remaining unfinished part being called Phase 1B.

=== Phase 1A ===
The first stage is known as EL3 Stage, named after ABS-CBN's chairman emeritus, Eugenio "Gabby" Lopez III. The second stage is simply called Stage 2. It features a support building called Breezeway Production Building which contains dressing rooms, wardrobe, and storage areas. At its roof has the 2013 ABS-CBN logo.

The two stages are currently being used by ABS-CBN Studios (Dreamscape Entertainment and Star Creatives) and ABS-CBN Films (Star Cinema and Black Sheep). The former produces serial content for linear television and on-demand streaming while the latter mainly produces feature films for theatrical releases, with the exception of titles released during the COVID-19 pandemic.

Your Moment was the first program to utilize the soundstage, followed by Idol Philippines for which it was dubbed "Idol City." It was rumored that the soundstage would house the noontime variety show It's Showtime; however, this never came to fruition and by July 25, 2022, the new set of It's Showtime was revealed to still be at Studio 3 of the ABS-CBN Broadcast Center in Quezon City. Other notable programs that were taped at the ABS-CBN Soundstage include Darna and the international prison drama, Sellblock.

=== Phase 1B ===
The other soundstage which will also have two stages is believed to be still under construction, although no updates are made public. Its opening date remains unannounced as of 2021.

=== Phase 2 and succeeding phases ===
The company remained mum with regard to the construction of succeeding phases of the soundstage and the Horizon IT Park complex as a whole. While direct correlation cannot be established, the ambiguity comes following the cease and desist order issued by the National Telecommunications Commission, and the eventual denial of Philippine Congress to renew ABS-CBN's franchise which resulted to the shutdown of their flagship station and their secondary channels on free-to-air radio and television.

Aside from the soundstage, Horizon IT Park also features backlots, production and post-production facilities, and offices.

=== Lease by other companies ===
On 2 December 2024, Singaporean company Mediacorp's studios division and Malaysian company Astro began leasing the soundstages, to increase their global footprint.

== See also ==
- ABS-CBN Broadcasting Center
- ELJ Communications Center
- List of real estate properties owned by ABS-CBN
- ABS-CBN Corporation
- ABS-CBN
