= KidZania Manila =

Family entertainment center in Taguig, Philippines

- Interactive map of KidZania Manila
- Location: Park Triangle, North 11th Avenue, Bonifacio Global City, Taguig, Metro Manila, Philippines
- Coordinates: 14°33′13″N 121°03′16″E
- Status: Defunct
- Opened: August 7, 2015; 11 years ago
- Closed: March 11, 2020; 6 years ago (unofficially closed due to COVID-19 restrictions); August 31, 2020; 6 years ago (official closure)
- Owner: ABS-CBN Corporation (73%); KidZania (27%)
- Operated by: Play Innovations, Inc.
- General manager: Ma. Rosario Bartolome (KidZania Philippines Governor)
- Theme: Educational entertainment
- Slogan: "Get ready for a better world." "Where kids do big things."
- Operating season: year-round
- Attendance: 360,000 (FY 2016)
- Area: 6,000 m^{2} (65,000 sq ft)

KidZania Manila was an indoor family entertainment center in Bonifacio Global City, Taguig, Metro Manila, Philippines. It was an ABS-CBN Corporation-owned franchise of KidZania, a Mexican chain of family entertainment centers which allowed children aged 4 to 14 to work in adult jobs and earn currency. KidZania Manila was opened to the general public on August 7, 2015, making it the 11th KidZania in Asia and the 20th in the world. It was closed permanently on August 31, 2020, after five years, due to the losses amid the COVID-19 pandemic in the country. As of 2025, the former location of KidZania Manila is currently occupied by The Street at BGC, owned by MCC Space Development Inc.

KidZania Manila formerly featured the front fuselage of a McDonnell Douglas DC-9 airplane, formerly operated by Northwest Airlines, as evidenced by the fleet number. It was repainted in Cebu Pacific colors and contained multiple flight simulators inside for the pilot job.

The nose of the plane protruded out of the building at a diagonal angle, with the rest of the aircraft inside the structure. The aircraft has since been removed.

== Awards ==
KidZania Manila, together with its PR agency, Strategic Works, Inc., won two Anvil Awards in 2017.
