= ABS-CBN Broadcasting Center =

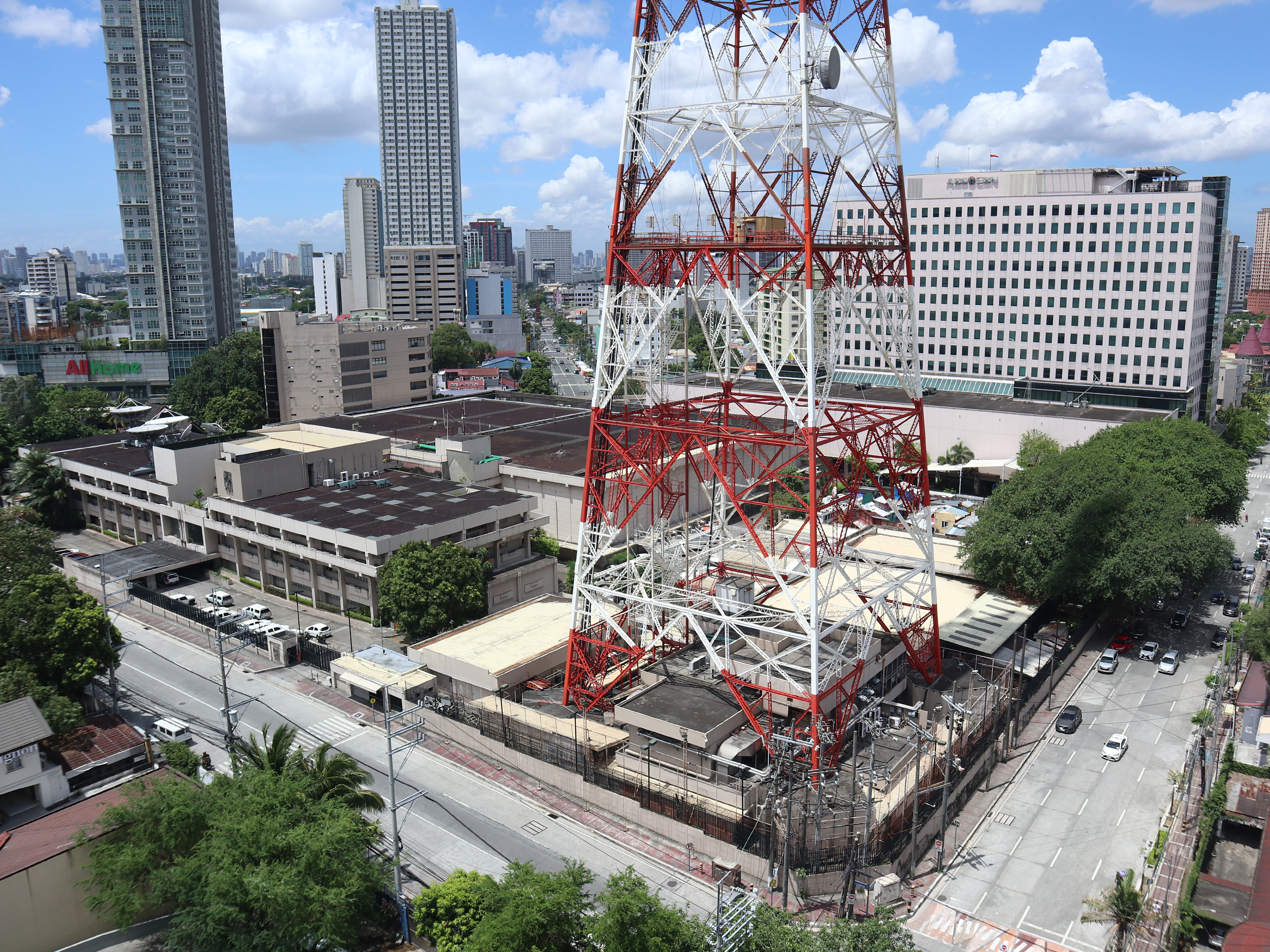
- ABS-CBN Broadcasting Center in May 2023

General information
- Status: Completed (Note: Operational (online and cable broadcasting activities i.e. Kapamilya Channel, ANC, Kapamilya Online Live, TFC, DZMM TeleRadyo as well as news and current affairs offices of ABS-CBN News, entertainment, television, and film production of ABS-CBN Entertainment and Star Cinema and its subsidiaries))
- Type: Studio, office, broadcasting
- Architectural style: Neo-modern
- Location: Sgt. Esguerra Avenue corner Mother Ignacia Street, Brgy. South Triangle, Diliman, Quezon City, Philippines
- Coordinates: 14°38′26″N 121°2′12″E
- Construction started: February 24, 1967
- Opening: December 18, 1968 (studios and original building); January 1, 2000 (ELJCC building)
- Renovated: 1992; 1999; 2010
- Closed: August 16, 2026 (gates)
- Demolished: TBD
- Owner: ABS-CBN Corporation (1968–1972, 1986–2026); Roberto Benedicto (1972–1978; KBS/RPN); Government of the Philippines (1974–1992; GTV/MBS/PTV/BB/PBS-BBS)

Height
- Antenna spire: 220 meters (Millennium Transmitter)

Technical details
- Floor count: 3
- Grounds: Approximately 44,000 m^{2}

Design and construction
- Architect: Carlos Arguelles
- Other designers: Wili Fernandez (interior design)

The ABS-CBN Broadcasting Center (also called ABS-CBN Broadcast Center; formerly known as Broadcast Plaza from 1974 to 1986 and current edifice formerly spelled officially as ABS-CBN Broadcasting Centre) is a soon-to-be-demolished original headquarters of the Filipino media and entertainment company ABS-CBN Corporation and its subsidiaries located at Sgt. Esguerra Avenue corner Mother Ignacia Street, Diliman, Quezon City, Philippines.

== History ==
=== 1968–1972: First era under ABS-CBN ===
The broadcasting center, conceptualized by ABS-CBN's then-President Eugenio Lopez Jr., began construction on February 24, 1967, and was opened on December 18, 1968, by then-president Ferdinand E. Marcos and then-first lady Imelda Marcos. Prior to the opening, ABS-CBN held headquarters in two separate buildings: the ABS building along Roxas Boulevard, Pasay (then in the province of Rizal) for ABS-CBN's Manila TV stations at that time (i.e. DZAQ-TV 3 and DZXL-TV 9), and the Chronicle Building along Aduana Street, Intramuros, Manila for its Manila radio stations. With the opening, ABS-CBN's radio and TV operations were housed in one building. ABS-CBN would soon sell the Roxas Boulevard studios to Kanlaon Broadcasting System or KBS (now known as Radio Philippines Network or RPN), which then took Channel 9 and prompted ABS-CBN to switch from Channels 3 and 9 to Channels 2 and 4.

When it was opened, it was the most advanced TV broadcasting facility in Asia. ABS-CBN mentioned that before Martial Law, it was once the training ground of TV electronics engineers from other countries. The new TV transmitter tower known as the Millennium Transmitter in the complex would begin beaming Channel 2 and 4's signals in 1969.

=== 1972–1981: Martial law and takeover by KBS/RPN, BBC, GTV/MBS and the Bureau of Broadcasts ===
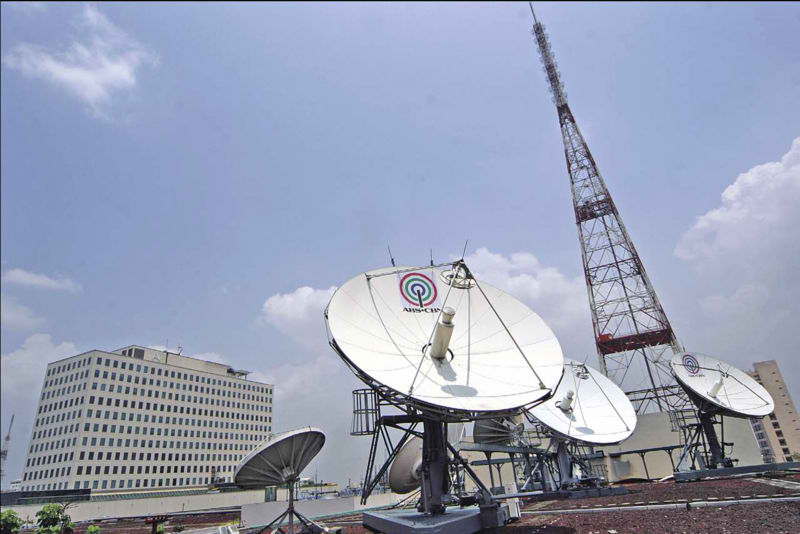
The ABS-CBN Broadcasting Center as viewed from the rooftop of the original building of ABS-CBN

On September 21, 1972, ABS-CBN was shut down after then-President Ferdinand Marcos declared martial law. All of its properties, which included the Broadcast Center, were seized from the company.

The facility was not to be used again at least until RPN (then KBS until renamed it to the latter in 1975), whose first facility sold by ABS-CBN was destroyed by a fire, took over the facility in 1973. It also became home of two newly formed networks BBC which took Channel 2 and Government Television (GTV) which took Channel 4 on February 2, 1974. The facility was also renamed as Broadcast Plaza.

RPN and BBC, were all owned by Roberto Benedicto (a prominent crony of Marcos − along with IBC, in which Benedicto bought the company (including its flagship channel 13) from the Canoys, who owns RMN and the Sorianos (as Inter-Island Broadcasting Corporation) in 1975; and IBC which is still based from then town of San Juan del Monte, Rizal province (now city of San Juan, Metro Manila) at that time), and GTV was owned by the government through National Media Production Center (NMPC). Benedicto owned the facility without any compensation. The crony-owned networks used ABS-CBN's facilities without even paying the company's owners, the Lopezes, making the company's technologies gradually dilapidated, resulting in it losing its prestige as one of the most advanced broadcasting centers in Asia.

In July 1978, RPN and BBC left the Broadcast Plaza (along with IBC from San Juan del Monte) for their new home in the Broadcast City, situated in Old Balara in Quezon City, leaving GTV, which at that point was relaunched as Maharlika Broadcasting System (MBS) two years later, as the sole tenant of the facility.

In 1980, the Bureau of Broadcasts (BB), a radio network also owned by the government under the Department/Ministry of Public Information, was also transferred to Broadcast Plaza from Philippine Communications Center (PHILCOMCEN) building at the corners of ADB Avenue and Ortigas Avenue in Ortigas Center, Pasig, Metro Manila after the Office of Media Affairs was created to provide a unitary form of media for both NMPC and the BB.

In 1986, the complex was stormed by anti-Marcos rebel soldiers that attacked and took over Channel 4 under the supervision of ABS-CBN's former General Manager Augusto Almeda-Lopez. Channel 4 then went back on the air to serve the people and to broadcast the historic People Power Revolution that resulted in Ferdinand Marcos being ousted from office.

=== 1986–1992: Housing ABS-CBN and PTV ===
After Marcos was deposed and when Corazon Aquino became the first female president, on February 25, 1986, MBS was changed its interim name to The New TV-4 until it was officially rebranded as the People's Television Network (PTV) in April 1986 while the radio properties of NMPC and the BB were integrated to the reinstated pre-Martial Law era Philippine Broadcasting Service (PBS, through the Bureau of Broadcast Services or BBS). The same year, RPN, IBC, and BBC were sequestered by the newly formed Presidential Commission on Good Government from Benedicto. BBC was dissolved and its frequencies were given to ABS-CBN, which was turned back to the Lopezes and was relaunched on September 14, 1986. RPN and IBC, on the other hand − were turned over to the government (under the Presidential Communications Group). While Channel 4 remained with PTV, Channel 2 of the former BBC was given back to ABS-CBN.

At that time, the facility was dilapidated. The technology in the facility was very old, the center was sorely lacking in tables, chairs, and telephones, there were plants growing on the compound's walls, and some of the studios' walls were even crumbling.

In January 1987, the company did get back the facility, but with an agreement with PTV (which also had to deal with the facility's outdated equipment) wherein they will share the space, splitting it 50–50 (until January 22, 1992). In just two years after reopening in 1986, ABS-CBN would soon regain ratings leadership and propel itself back to financial stability.

During the coup attempt against President Aquino on August 28, 1987, a fierce fire fight between rebel soldiers and the police raged around the compound as rebel soldiers seized PTV. Eventually, the rebels' assault was thwarted and PTV was back under the control of the government, but in the midst of the conflict, P/Sgt. Eduardo A. Esguerra of the Quezon City Police Department fell and died in the compound. A marker in his memory on the spot where he died was erected a year after the assault, and Bohol Avenue, where ABS-CBN is situated, was eventually renamed Sgt. Esguerra Avenue.

The company soon filed a case against Marcos, Benedicto, and his networks for not compensating for the usage of the broadcast technology and equipment in the facility that clearly belonged to ABS-CBN. At this point, the facility's former tenant RPN and its then-sister station IBC, once the dominant channels, both slumped in the ratings as ABS-CBN furthered its supremacy during the tail-end of the decade.

In 1988, a fire hit one of the studios in the compound, injuring a few people and slightly damaging the broadcast equipment. It was also the site of a failed military coup in 1989 that attempted to overthrow the then-current Aquino government.

DZMM, ABS-CBN's flagship AM radio station, soon moved to the Broadcast Center in 1987, along with DWRR, its flagship FM radio station. Prior to this, DZMM was once housed at the Chronicle Building (now Benpres Building) in Ortigas Center, Pasig, where it was relaunched in 1986 as a news and commentary station.

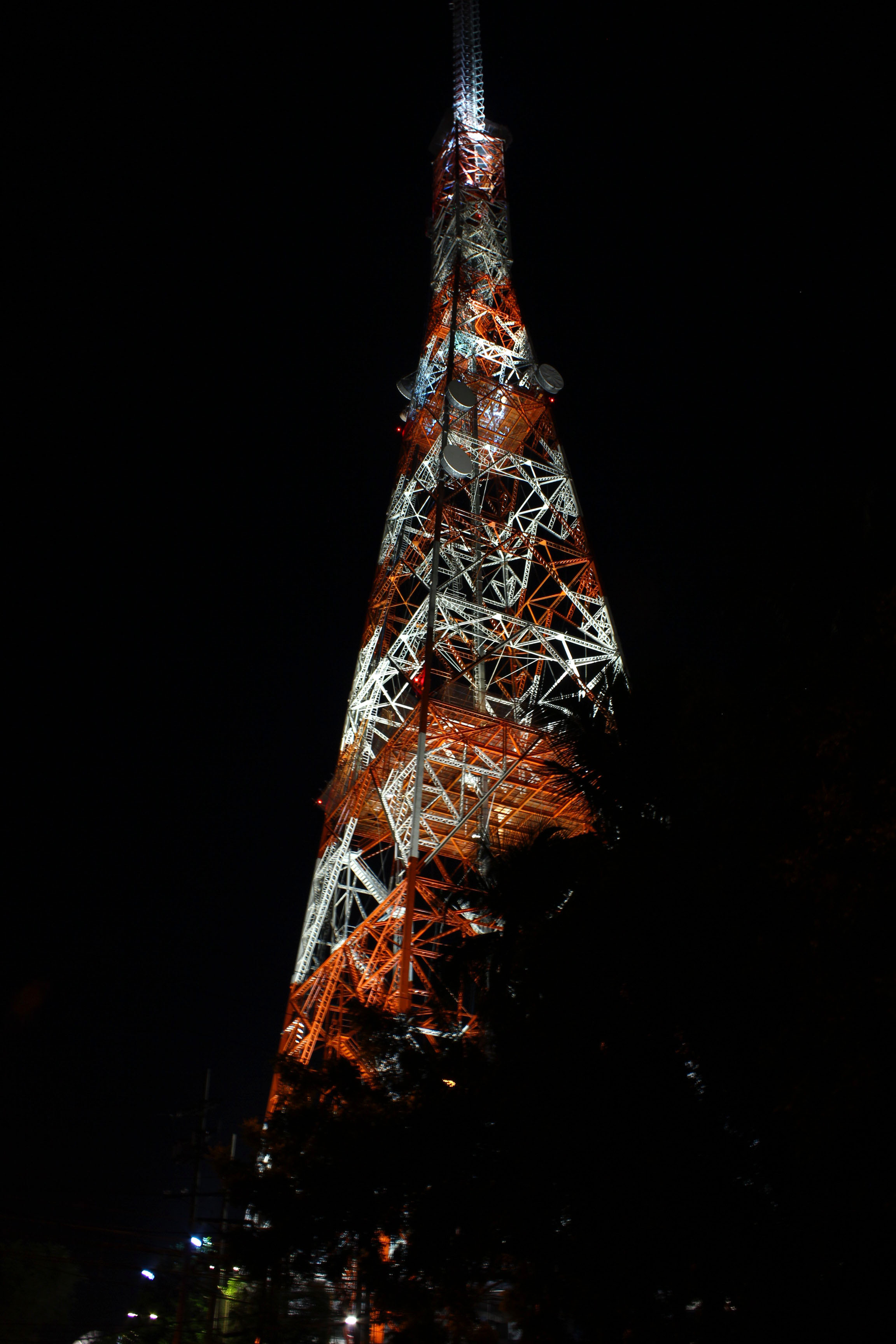
Millennium Transmitter at night

=== 1992–1999: Second era under ABS-CBN ===
After past five years and four months of reopening on January 22, 1992, ABS-CBN finally regained full control of the facility after both PTV and the PBS/BBS moved out of the area to a new broadcasting complex (PIA/Government Information and Media Center Building) and the new 500 ft (150 m) transmitter tower situated in Visayas Avenue, Quezon City.

The company renovated the Broadcasting Center and began the long, tedious process of updating its broadcasting technology and equipment. By the end of the millennium, the Broadcast Center had become the most advanced broadcast facility in the Philippines.

=== 2000–2025: The new millennium ===
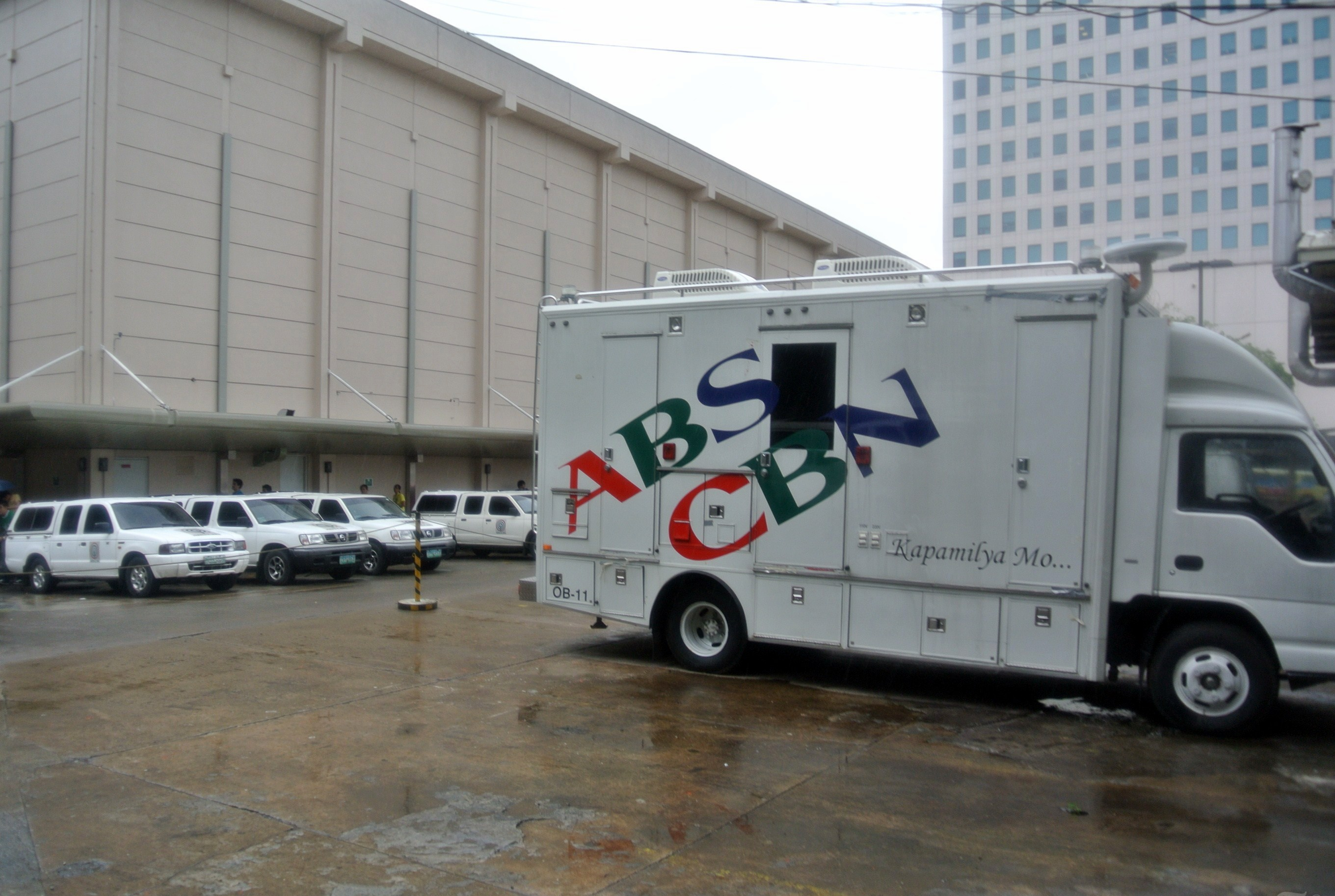
The ABS-CBN Studios and open parking lot in 2012

In 2000, the Broadcasting Center was renovated again, with its hallways turned into a picture gallery of the stars and personalities, and the transmitter in the complex was relaunched as the Millennium Transmitter, increasing its transmitter power to 120 kilowatts.

That same year, the company moved most of its operations to the newly inaugurated Eugenio Lopez Jr. Communications Center, named in honor of the company's late chairman Eugenio Lopez Jr. It became the new home of the offices of many of the company's operations as well as four new technologically advanced studios (including Studio 10, the biggest studio in the complex, and the home of ASAP, ABS-CBN's longest-running Sunday noontime variety show). The building was accredited by PEZA as an IT zone in 2003.

The building was built mainly to suit ABS-CBN's growing demands - a result of its diversification from a broadcasting network to a media powerhouse engaging not only in radio and TV broadcasting but now also in movie production, records, merchandising, cable and UHF TV, international services, and post-production. The Broadcast Center is still being used as the headquarters for the company's news division and its nine studios are still being used by entertainment programs.

In 2003 (ABS-CBN's 50th anniversary), the National Historical Commission set up a plaque in the entrance of the ABS-CBN Broadcast Center, honouring the first TV broadcast made in the country, made by DZAQ-TV Channel 3, owned by Alto Broadcasting System, precursor of ABS-CBN.

In 2005, the Millennium Transmitter increased its power to 346.2 kilowatts (60 kW TPO), the most powerful in its history. In 2008, in honor of the 80th birthday of one of its most prized talents, the comedian Dolphy (who was with ABS-CBN for most of his showbiz career), Studio 1 was renamed as the Dolphy Theater. In 2009, the Millennium Transmitter increased its height to 720 feet (220 m) and was also reinforced with powerful dipole antennas replacing the cylinder antennas.

Throughout early and mid-2020, in the midst of the COVID-19 pandemic in the Philippines, the broadcasting center became the site of the commemoration following the expiration of the ABS-CBN's franchise, and the subsequent rallies and noise barrages generated by thousands of ABS-CBN employees and supporters, regarding the opposition of the verdict from the House of Representatives.

On September 6, 2022, a fire was struck inside the ABS-CBN compound. The fire reached the first alarm before it was declared out around 8:39 am PST (UTC+08:00).

On September 11, 2022, the Millennium Transmitter was leased by Advanced Media Broadcasting System to air its flagship television station, All TV, after its broadcast franchise lapsed in 2020. All TV later beginning simulcasting several ABS-CBN programs since April 15, 2024, marking the return of TV Patrol and It's Showtime to their original home after four years.

On March 7, 2023, reports said that the Broadcast Center will be demolished to be sold to ABS-CBN's sister company Rockwell Land Corporation. ABS-CBN and Rockwell Land Corporation later issued respective statements confirming that while it has been exploring the redevelopment of the Broadcast Center even before the COVID-19 pandemic, no agreement has yet been reached. The statements were issued to clarify several erroneous news reports that the property has been sold to Rockwell Land for redevelopment.

=== 2025–present: Acquisition by Ayala Land ===
On February 27, 2025, ABS-CBN announced in a disclosure to the Philippine Stock Exchange that it will sell most of the Broadcast Center to Ayala Land for redevelopment, pending regulatory approval, while retaining 1.4 hectares of the property (primarily the ELJ Communications Center) where it will consolidate its operations along with its already built soundstages, post-production and production facility at the Horizon PEZA IT Park in San Jose del Monte, Bulacan. The deal will take effect in December 2026.

On July 9, 2025, the Millennium Transmitter was closed in preparation for demolition, the first to be dismantled before the Broadcast Center.

On August 20, 2025, ABS-CBN and Ayala Land have signed the deeds of absolute sale for the purchase of the sold properties.

On August 16, 2026, the gates of the Broadcast Center were closed.

== Offices ==
ABS-CBN Broadcasting Center houses the company's subsidiaries, broadcast facilities, offices, and ELJ Communications Center. It is also where the transmitter site of All TV is situated which was previously used by ABS-CBN before it became inactive due to the 2020 broadcast franchise renewal dispute with ownership of the transmitter and the land where it stands continued with the company until 2026. It occupies an area of 44,000 square meters including the ELJ Communications Center. It was originally built in 1968 and was then the most advanced broadcast facility in Asia. Today, it is now the country's largest and most technologically advanced media facility. Meanwhile, ABS-CBN's production facility is located at ABS-CBN Horizon IT Park in San Jose del Monte, Bulacan.

Built as the headquarters of ABS-CBN, the center has since seen several management changes, such as a takeover by RPN and sister station BBC in 1973, the addition of a third tenant, the government station GTV (now PTV) on February 2, 1974, and then the departure of RPN and BBC in July 1978 to Broadcast City (along with then-sister station IBC from San Juan del Monte) and the entry of NMPC and BB in 1980 which accompanied the remaining tenant MBS. From 1986 to 1992, the reopened ABS-CBN and PTV, along with PBS, shared the Broadcast Center and following PTV's departure in 1992, ABS-CBN has since regained full control of the facility.

=== ABS-CBN original building ===
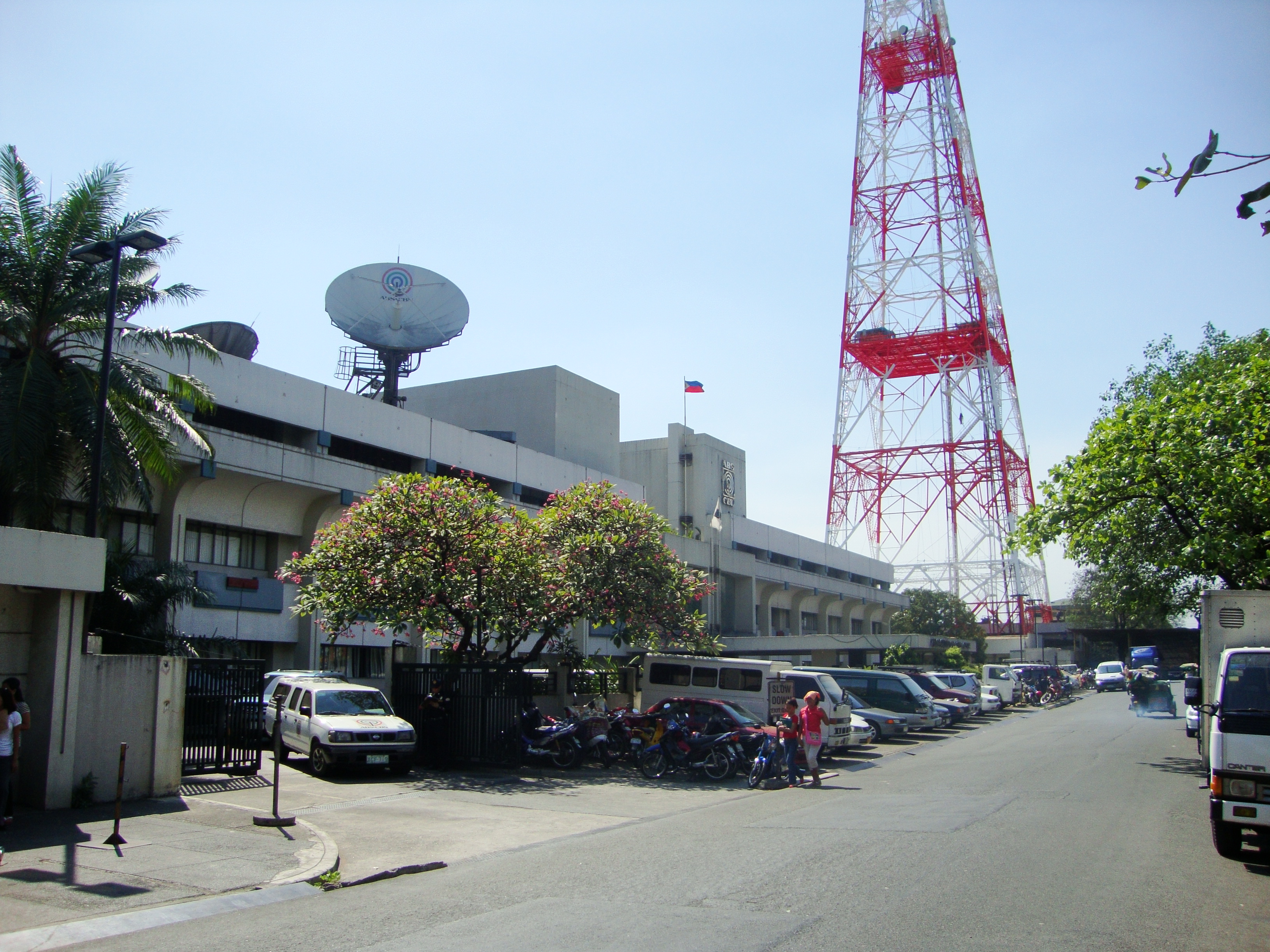
Original building of ABS-CBN Broadcasting Center, as seen in 2010

The ABS-CBN original building was originally built in 1968 and was the only area of business operations of the company until it expanded for 26 years from 2000 to 2026 when the ELJ Communications Center was opened. It is directly connected to the studios which were also built in 1968. The main entrance to the whole complex is located here. Today, it is mainly occupied by ABS-CBN News and Current Affairs and the Manila Radio Division which consist of DZMM Radyo Patrol 630 (AM) and MOR Entertainment (Online Radio/Podcast production) as well as the ABS-CBN News' website (News.ABS-CBN.com). The ABS-CBN Newsroom which is used by the ABS-CBN News Channel and other news programs of ABS-CBN (notably TV Patrol from April 22 to May 12, 2019) for live broadcasts is located here.

There is also a historical marker at the building's entrance which commemorates the first TV broadcast in the Philippines which was made by ABS-CBN on October 23, 1953, which was issued by the National Historical Commission of the Philippines in 2003, the 50th anniversary of ABS-CBN and Philippine television.

=== ABS-CBN Studios ===
ABS-CBN's studios are the television studios of the former network. It is actually a single large building that houses seven studios, with the other three studios are part of the newer ELJ Communications Center located at the building's first floor. The ten studios were built in 1968 and 2000 for the first seven and last three, respectively, and it is directly connected to the original building and ELJ Communications Center.

ABS-CBN Studios
Studio	Production	Notes
Dolphy Theatre (Studio 1)	Shows produced: Eat Bulaga! (1989–1994), including the theater, live shows, concerts, events, etc.	It was named in honor of Filipino comedian Dolphy in celebration of his 80th birthday in 2008.
Studio 2	Shows produced: The Sharon Cuneta Show (1988–1996, 1997), Sa Linggo nAPO Sila (1989–1995), Showtime (2009–2012), Gandang Gabi, Vice! (2011–2020), Sarah G. Live (2012–2013), Everybody, Sing! (2021–present), Rainbow Rumble (2024–2026), etc.	
Studio 3	Shows produced: 'Sang Linggo nAPO Sila (1997–1998), ASAP (1997–2004), MTB (1998–2005), Wowowee (2005–2010), Pilipinas Win Na Win (2010), The Price is Right (2011), Happy Yipee Yehey! (2011–2012), It's Your Lucky Day (2023), etc. Shows currently airing in Studio 3: It's Showtime (2012–present)	Studio 3 is home of the various game and variety shows. Studio 3 is also known for being the home of ABS-CBN's noontime shows such as It's Showtime, Wowowee, and many more.
Studio 4	Shows produced: Your Face Sounds Familiar, Dance Kids, etc.	Studio 4 houses several game shows.
Studio 5	Shows produced: Ang TV, Goin' Bulilit, Minute to Win It, Sunday TV Mass, Teysi (2003–2004), Teysi ng Tahanan (1991–1997), The Healing Eucharist, Today with Kris Aquino (1996–2001), etc.	Studio 5 is the home studio of various sketch comedy shows and well-known religious programs.
Studio 6	Programs of ABS-CBN News Channel	
ABS-CBN Newscenter Manila (Studio 7)	ABS-CBN's flagship newscasts: TV Patrol, News Patrol, The World Tonight Shows currently airing in Studio 7: TV Patrol, TV Patrol Weekend, News Patrol, The World Tonight	Also hosts the master control or broadcast feed responsible for scheduling the broadcast, transmission, or airing order of TV programs, silent break bumpers, and network and product ads of Kapamilya Channel, A2Z if connected to the said feed, and All TV since April 15, 2024, as well as its other owned networks.
Studio 8	Shows produced: Pilipinas, Game KNB (2001–2009) and more.	temporary studio set-up, where the props and set decorations are dismantled after the show.
Studio 9	Shows produced: Showbiz Lingo (1992–1999), The Buzz (1999–2015), Talk TV (2001–2002), Morning Girls (2002–2004), Good Morning, Kris (2004), Morning Star (2004–2005), Homeboy (2005–2007), Boy & Kris (2007–2009), Ruffa & Ai (2009), Simply KC (2010), Kris TV (2011–2016), Magandang Buhay (2016–2026), Tonight with Boy Abunda (2015–2020) Shows currently airing in Studio 9: Gandang Gabi Vice (2026–present)	
Studio 10	Shows produced: ASAP (2004–2026), Pilipinas Got Talent, etc.	Studio 10 is also used for television specials.

=== ABS-CBN DTC Building ===
The ABS-CBN Development and Talent Center building, which is also known as the DTC building, is a seven-story building that houses two studios, rehearsal rooms, a storage area, and the offices of ABS-CBN Star Magic Workshop and DTT channels, including Cine Mo!. Studios 11 and 12, which are located in the building's fourth floor, are used by ABS-CBN CPI's programs. The building was completed after 1998 and was the home of Star Magic before moving its offices to the ELJ building. ABS-CBN Sports occupied the entire 7th floor before its Technical group was disbanded and its Production team moved to a room inside DZMM.

=== Gina Lopez Building ===
The Gina Lopez Building, or also known as the ABS-CBN Foundation Building, is a five-story building behind the ELJ Communications Center. Built during the 1990s, the building houses the offices of the programs and initiatives under AFI. The building was renovated and retrofitted during the late 2000s. The building was renamed in 2020 after Gina Lopez, who died in 2019.

=== ABS-CBN Audience Entrance and Tulong Center ===
The ABS-CBN Audience Entrance, which is located along Eugenio Lopez Drive, serves as the main entrance for audiences of ABS-CBN shows. The building houses several food stalls and a lounge for audiences before being accommodated in live tapings. The building also housed the ABS-CBN Tulong Center, which was closed following the company's retrenchment program due to the non-broadcast franchise renewal.

=== ELJ Communications Center ===
The Eugenio Lopez Jr. Communications Center (also called 9501, ELJ Communications Center, or simply ELJ Center) is the newer and larger studio and office building of ABS-CBN that was originally part of the ABS-CBN Broadcasting Center from 2000 until 2026. The building occupies ten thousand (10,000) square meters of land area and houses the company's offices, studios, three-level basement parking, roof deck helipad, film archive, studio gallery, dining restaurant and events room, and garden. At the left and right sides of the building originally had the 1999 ABS-CBN logo barely visible and blended to its color until 2013, before the 2013 one in grey metallic composition with the symbol in red, green, blue, and black colors that illuminates at night replaced the 1999 logo on late 2014 (although the building with the 1999 logo was later remade in 2025 as a display located within the compound). The building has a gross floor area of 101,608.32 square meters; almost seventy thousand (70,000) square meters of office space and over thirty thousand (30,000) square meters of parking space. The construction of the building, which cost 6 billion pesos, began in 1995, but was delayed due to the Asian Financial Crisis in 1997. It was opened in 2000, and was occupied gradually by the company in the following years, expanding the area of its business operations. It is a PEZA Special Economic Zone, designated as an IT center. It is named in honor of the late Eugenio Lopez Jr., the chairman emeritus of ABS-CBN. The dedication of the building was held on November 4, 2010, in a ceremony that was attended by the then-Philippine President Benigno Aquino III.

== See also ==
- ABS-CBN Soundstage
- ELJ Communications Center
