= ELJ Communications Center =

- The center as viewed from Eugenio Lopez Street.

General information
- Status: Completed
- Type: PEZA special economic zone, offices, soundstage
- Architectural style: Modern
- Location: Eugenio Lopez Drive, Diliman, Quezon City, Metro Manila, Philippines
- Coordinates: 14°38′22.18″N 121°02′07.79″E
- Construction started: 1995
- Opening: January 1, 2000
- Renovated: 2010
- Cost: ₱6 billion (US$148.5 million)
- Owner: ABS-CBN Corporation

Technical details
- Floor count: 15 above ground, 3 below ground
- Floor area: 101,608.32 m^{2} (1,093,702.85 sq ft.)
- Lifts/elevators: 13
- Grounds: 14,000 m^{2} (150,694.75 sq ft.)

Design and construction
- Architecture firm: Gensler; GF & Partners, Architects, Co.
- Other designers: Leandro V. Locsin Partners (interior design)
- Main contractor: Datem, Inc.

The Eugenio Lopez Jr. Communications Center (also called 9501, ELJ Communications Center, or simply ELJ Center) is the headquarters of the Filipino media and entertainment company ABS-CBN Corporation and its subsidiaries located at Eugenio Lopez Drive, Diliman, Quezon City, Philippines.

== History ==
The construction of the building, which cost 6 billion pesos, began in 1995, but was delayed due to the Asian Financial Crisis in 1997. It was opened in 2000, and was occupied gradually by the company in the following years, expanding the area of its business operations. It is a PEZA Special Economic Zone, designated as an IT center. It is named in honor of Eugenio Lopez Jr., the chairman emeritus of ABS-CBN. The dedication of the building was held on November 4, 2010, in a ceremony that was attended by then-Philippine President Benigno Aquino III.

In 2013, the whole center became one of the first 4G LTE zones in the country after Globe and Sun Cellular upgraded their respective transmitters inside the complex.

On February 27, 2025, ABS-CBN announced in a disclosure to the Philippine Stock Exchange that it would retain the ELJ Communications Center along with another facility in San Jose del Monte, Bulacan following a sale of most the ABS-CBN Broadcasting Center's property to Ayala Land. On August 20, 2025, ABS-CBN and Ayala Land have signed the deeds of absolute sale for the purchase of the sold properties.

== Structures ==
The ELJ Communications Center as viewed from the ABS-CBN Broadcasting Center open parking lot.

ELJ Communications Center occupies fourteen thousand (14,000) square meters of land area. The building has a gross floor area of 101,608.32 square meters; almost seventy thousand (70,000) square meters of office space and over thirty thousand (30,000) square meters of parking space. The building was originally part of ABS-CBN Broadcasting Center from 2000 until its demolition in 2026.

=== Offices ===
The building is composed of two interconnecting structures. These are the three thousand square meter (3,000), fifteen-storey and the two thousand square meter (2,000), twelve-storey buildings joint together by steel and glass structures. The exterior of the building has a garden.

The ground floor level is a mixed-use commercial area called The Loop and Tower Entrance, which is home to several retail shops, dining outlets, and a studio called The Loop Studio which was used by the now defunct morning news and talk show Umagang Kay Ganda. A studio gallery (known as such from the leftmost exterior entrance), lobby, and the main reception area are also located on its ground floor. Located on its second floor are the offices of Star Cinema and ABS-CBN's human resources division, dressing and rehearsal rooms, and the hallway leading to its studios and technical rooms.

The divisions and subsidiaries' offices are on the third to twelfth floors. ABS-CBN Post Production unit, iPost, is on the third floor, while its legal department, corporate communications, licensing, and media asset management (Big Dipper) are located on the fourth floor. ABS-CBN Sports, tax accounting, human resources, and former Fitness First space could be visited at the fifth floor. Sky Cable and former space of Expert Global Solutions are on the sixth floor. In 2026, the sixth floor serves as the new Pinoy Big Brother house. The eighth floor is home to their Information Technology division, Creative Programs, and ABS-CBN Publishing, while ABS-CBN Global and Digital Media Division could be found on the ninth floor. ABS-CBN's wholly owned subsidiary, The Big Dipper Digital Content & Design, Inc. (Big Dipper), with offices located on the center's fourth floor, is an approved economic zone enterprise of PEZA, making it eligible for tax holiday and other incentives. In 2010, the company has availed an income tax holiday incentives of 472 million pesos. In 2011 and 2012, the company has availed 188 million and 204 million pesos respectively. In 2014, PEZA approved the application of Big Dipper for the entitlement of the Pioneer Status.

The thirteenth floor houses the conference rooms, while the now-defunct executive dining restaurant of ABS-CBN, Restaurant 9501 was located on the fourteenth floor of the building. The executive offices are located on the building's fifteenth floor. ABS-CBN Film Archives, which holds the largest film collection in the country occupies one of the floors of the building’s three level basement which also serves as the building’s parking area.

=== Gina Lopez Building ===
At the front of the ELJ Communications building was the original headquarters of the non-profit corporate responsibility institution ABS-CBN Foundation, Inc., named after its long-time leader Gina Lopez. Since October 2026, the site serves as the façade for the new Pinoy Big Brother house, dubbed as “Bahay ni Kuya”, featuring a redesigned exterior for PBB: Collab 3.0. while its original house that had stood since the show’s 2005 premiere was demolished after PBB: Celebrity Collab Edition 2.0., and the ABS-CBN Foundation Inc. is relocated inside the ELJ Communications building.

=== Studios ===
At the back of ELJ Communications Center are ultra-modern television studios popularly referred to as ABS-CBN Studios. It is actually a large soundstage that is directly connected to the back of the ELJ Communications Center. It is further divided into three smaller studios. Studio 10, the largest studio of ABS-CBN with a floor area of one thousand (1,000) square meters, was used by the musical variety show ASAP as well as a number of reality shows and television specials. Studio 9, is used by the late-night talk show, Gandang Gabi Vice and Studio 8 is a temporary studio set-up, where the props and set decorations are dismantled after every show and is currently being used by various shows. There is also an elephant door that leads to the soon to be demolished ABS-CBN Broadcasting Center. These will be the only remaining studios of ABS-CBN in Quezon City upon the demolition of ABS-CBN Broadcasting Center in 2026 in addition to its existing studios located in Bulacan.

=== The west wing of the center ===
The west wing of the center overseeing the Millennium Transmitter.

ELJ Communications Center in 2019.

ELJ Communications Center in 2010.

The ABS-CBN Studio Annex.

The ELJCC "Tower Entrance."

The ABS-CBN Foundation Building (now renamed Gina Lopez Building since 2020).

=== The east wing of the center ===
The glass structure connecting the superstructure and substructure.

The glass structure connecting the superstructure and Studio Annex.

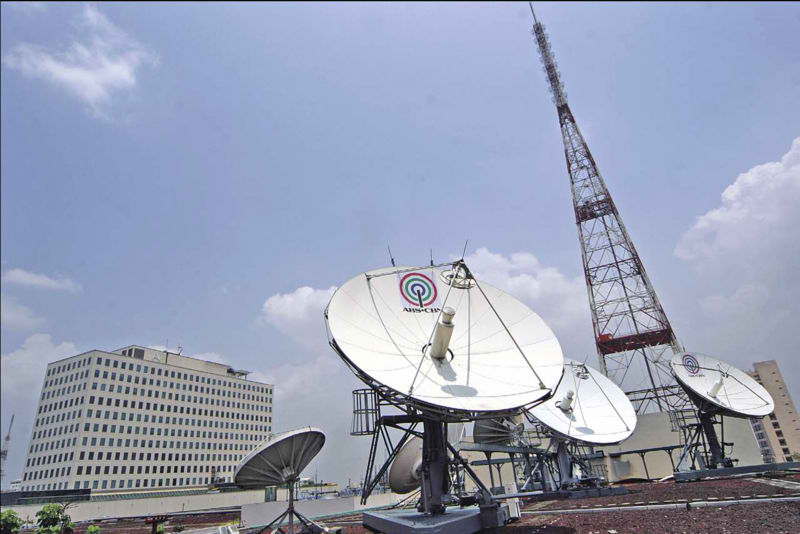
The ABS-CBN Broadcasting Center as viewed from the rooftop of the main building of ABS-CBN. ELJ Communications Center (left) and Millennium Transmitter (right).
