= Millennium Transmitter =

Broadcast transmitter tower in Manila

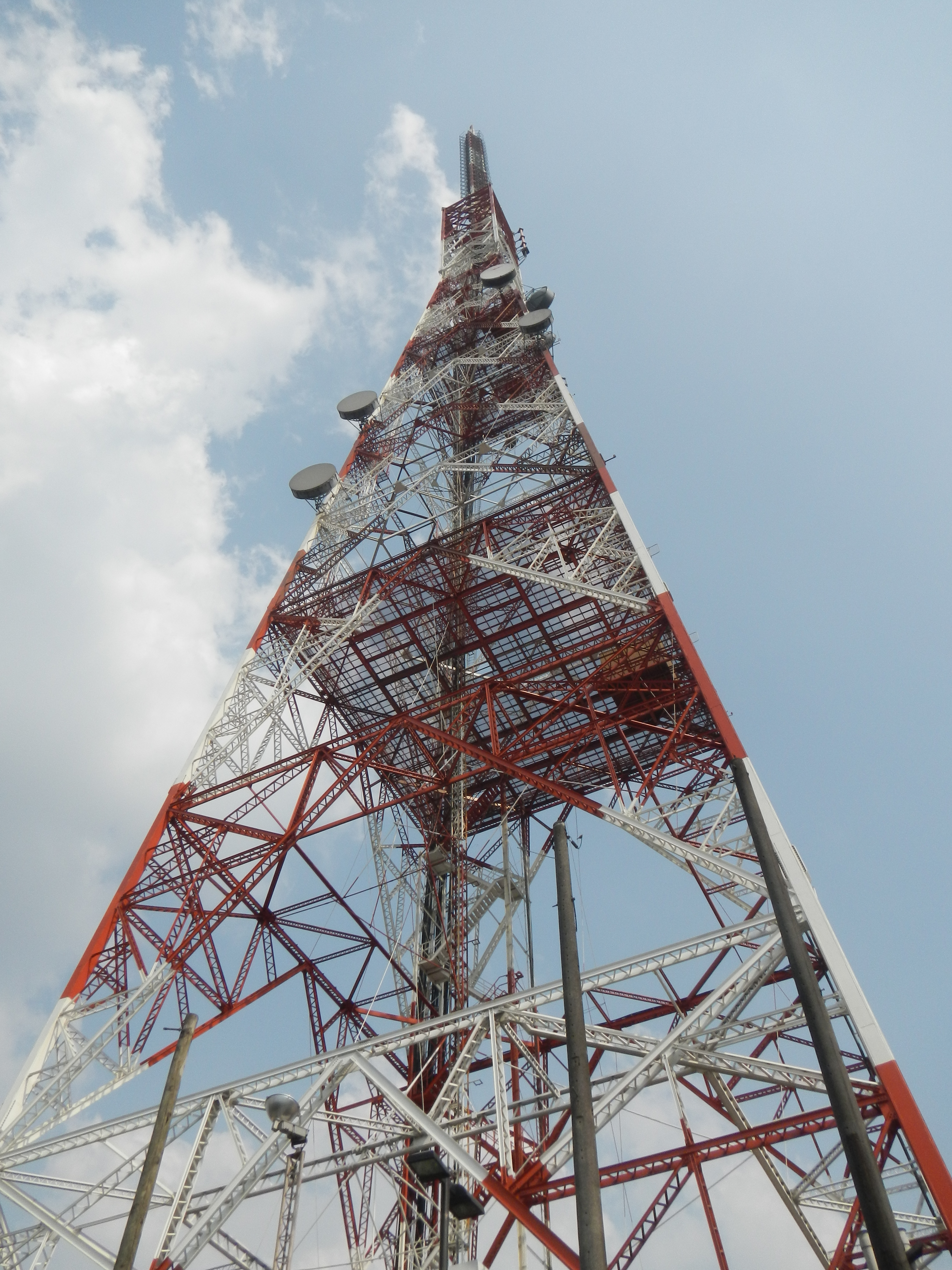
- The Millennium Transmitter in 2016
- Alternate names: ABS-CBN Tower; AMBS Tower
- Location: Quezon City, Metro Manila, Philippines
- Tower height: 219.5 m (720 ft)
- Coordinates: 14°38′25.36″N 121°02′12.08″E
- Commissioned: March 21, 1969; 57 years ago
- Decommissioned: July 9, 2025; 13 months ago
- Owner: ABS-CBN Corporation (1969–1972; 1986–2026); Kanlaon Broadcasting System/Radio Philippines Network Inc. (1972–1978); Banahaw Broadcasting Corporation (1973–1986); People's Television Network Inc. (1974–1992)

The Millennium Transmitter is a soon-to-be-demolished 219.5-meter (720 ft) tall mast transmitter owned by ABS-CBN Corporation and operated by Advanced Media Broadcasting System located at the ABS-CBN Broadcasting Center, Mother Ignacia Street corner Sgt. Esguerra Avenue, Barangay South Triangle, Quezon City. The transmitter was used by AMBS to serve as the platform for television transmission of All TV on analog Channel 2 and digital Channel 16 (frequencies formerly used by ABS-CBN itself as its flagship station DWWX-TV and transmits from this tower before it ceased broadcast operations on May 5, 2020). It was also used as the main transmission site for ABS-CBN-owned DWAC-TV Channel 23, the flagship station of S+A, (before shutting down on reassigned to Aliw Broadcasting Corporation) and its radio station DWRR until it was relocated to Antipolo when the transmitter was upgraded by the end of 1999.

== History ==
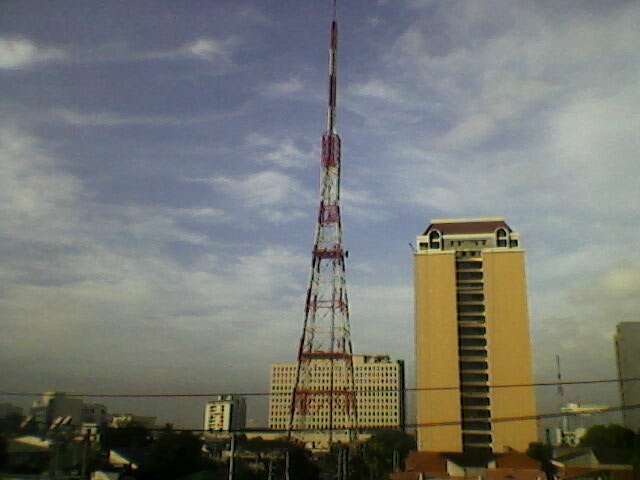
Millennium Transmitter (right) before renovation

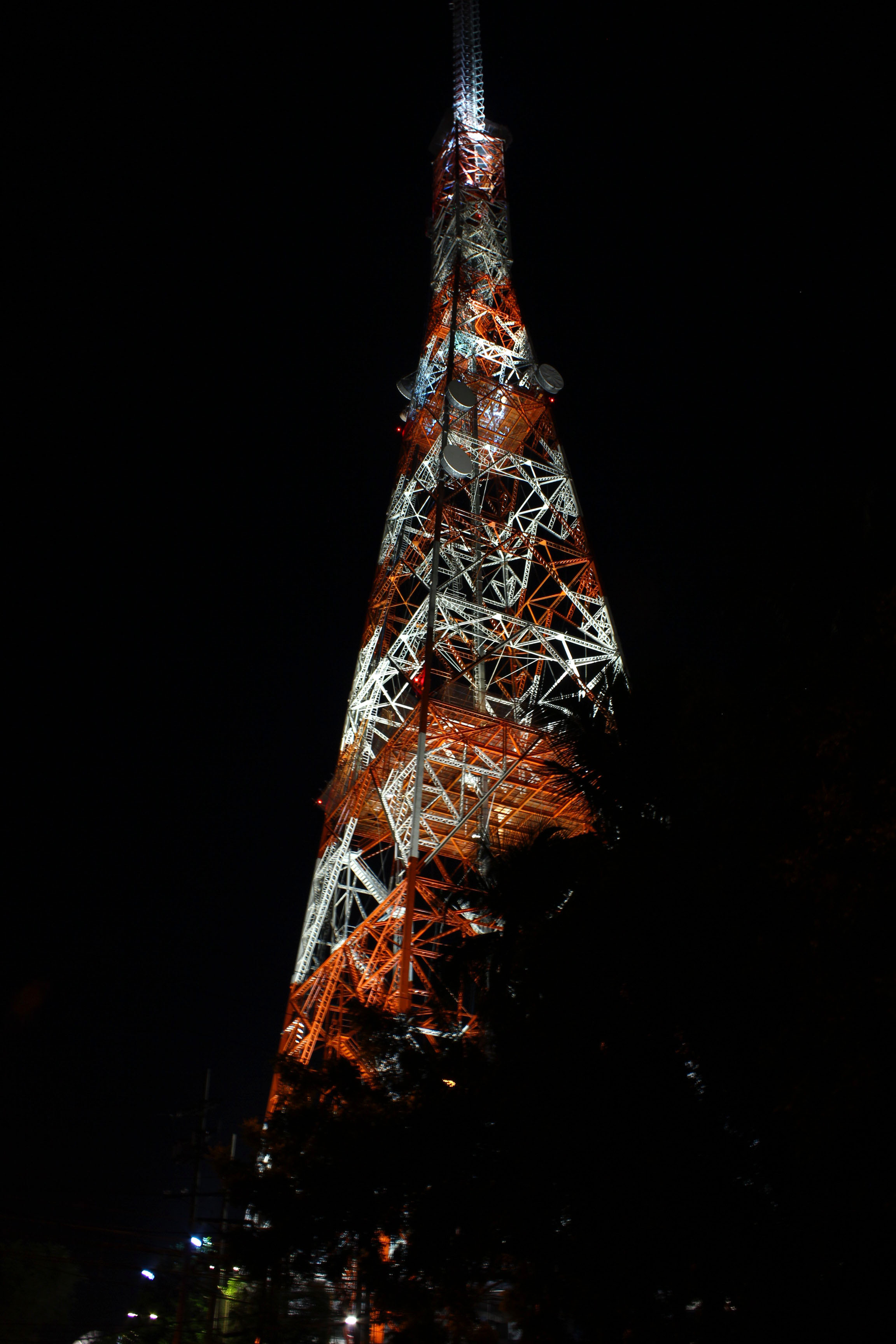
Millennium Tower at night in 2012

The Millennium Transmitter, also known as the ABS-CBN Tower, and provisionally called as AMBS Tower (from 2022 to July 9, 2025), was constructed at the corner of Mother Ignacia Street and Sgt. Esguerra Avenue, within the ABS-CBN Broadcasting Center, at the time of its construction, it was one of the tallest lattice towers in the world. Construction began in the third quarter of 1968. On March 21, 1969, the tower became operational, transmitting television and radio for ABS-CBN and also used to beam color broadcasts in Metro Manila, and to nearby provinces. After martial law was declared on September 21, 1972, as ABS-CBN suspended their operations the following day, the facility was taken over by the crony-owned BBC-2 from 1973 to 1979; state-run People's Television's predecessors GTV/MBS-4 also occupied the tower from 1974 to 1992 to beam their programs. When the EDSA Revolution happened, both the tower and Broadcast Plaza were stormed by reformist rebels as escalating battle occurred on February 24, 1986. After the revolution, the tower was returned to ABS-CBN. Since then, the tower became the primary source of transmission for both DWWX-TV and DWRR and later it began transmitting the company's sister UHF station DWAC-TV in 1996.

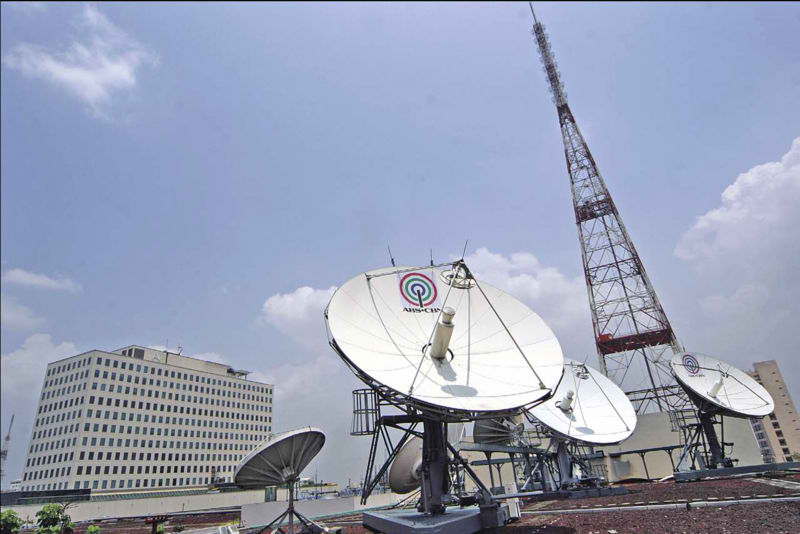
The ABS-CBN Broadcasting Center as viewed from the rooftop of the main building of ABS-CBN. Millennium Transmitter (right).

Its previous height was 650 ft (198.1 m), until ABS-CBN started a major reconstruction and rehabilitation of the whole tower, which included changing cylinder antennas to the more powerful dipole antennas with reflector, and increase of its height which was finished by the 3rd quarter of 2009.

On June 30, 2020, the transmitter was shut off due to a cease and desist order from the National Telecommunications Commission after ABS-CBN's legislative franchise expired on May 4, 2020.

After two years of being non-operational for transmission, ABS-CBN granted the request of AMBS to use the transmitter for the analog and digital broadcasts of All TV. This was confirmed by Willie Revillame on his show Wowowin. ALLTV later beginning simulcasting several ABS-CBN programs, such as TV Patrol and It's Showtime, since April 15, 2024, until it expanded it's airtime via brand licensing agreement on January 2, 2026. This marked the return of ABS-CBN's operations to the transmitter tower after four years since its shutdown in 2020, albeit as an airtime lease operator.

On February 27, 2025, ABS-CBN announced that it would sell most of the Broadcast Center to Ayala Land, pending regulatory approval to the Philippine Stock Exchange. On March 2, 2025, Ogie Alcasid shared a post on social media, where he casually confirmed that the Millennium Transmitter would soon be demolished by 2026. On July 9, 2025, the Millennium Transmitter was closed in preparation for demolition, the first to be dismantled before the Broadcast Center, just 5 years after the new franchise was rejected by the Congress. On August 20, 2025, ABS-CBN and Ayala Land have signed the deeds of absolute sale for the purchase of the sold properties.

== Features ==
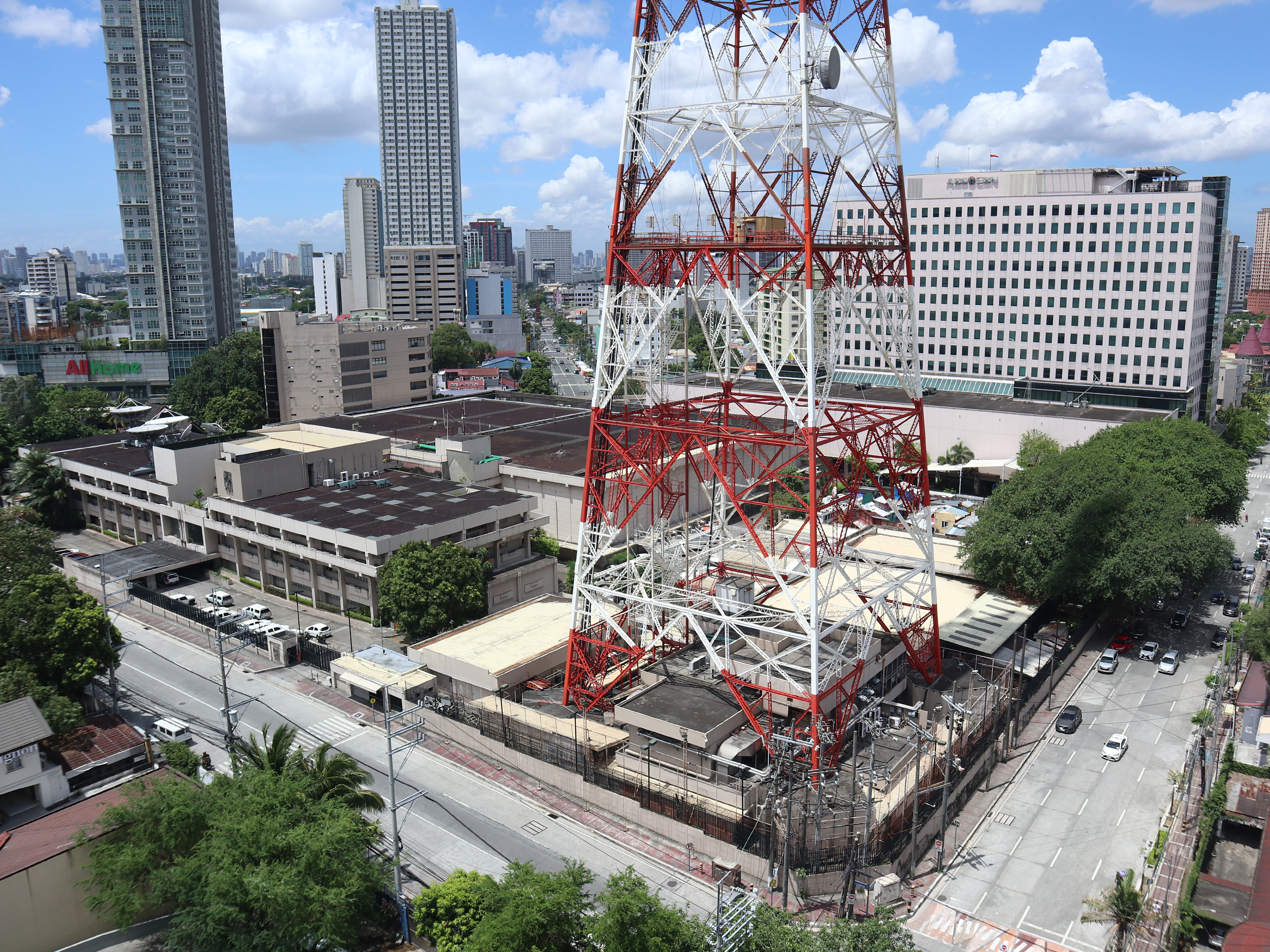
The base of the Millenium Transmitter

=== Tower ===
The tower uses dipole antennas with reflector, and UHF panel antennas for wide coverage of analog (VHF and UHF TV) and digital (ISDB-T) TV reception in Metro Manila some nearby provinces in both grades A and B, for the broadcasts of DWWX-TV and DWAC-TV respectively. Despite the name, the Millennium Transmitter is not a transmitter of its own, but rather a communications tower with antennas connected to multiple transmitters.

=== Transmitter facility ===
The transmitter facility housed both DWWX-TV and DWAC-TV that contained sets of transmitter equipment imported by Harris and Jampro of the United States.

== See also ==
- ABS-CBN
- DWWX-TV
- DWAC-TV
- DWGT-TV
- GMA Tower of Power
- List of tallest structures in the Philippines
- List of transmission sites
- Lattice tower
