= Kapamilya Box Office =

Philippine television channel

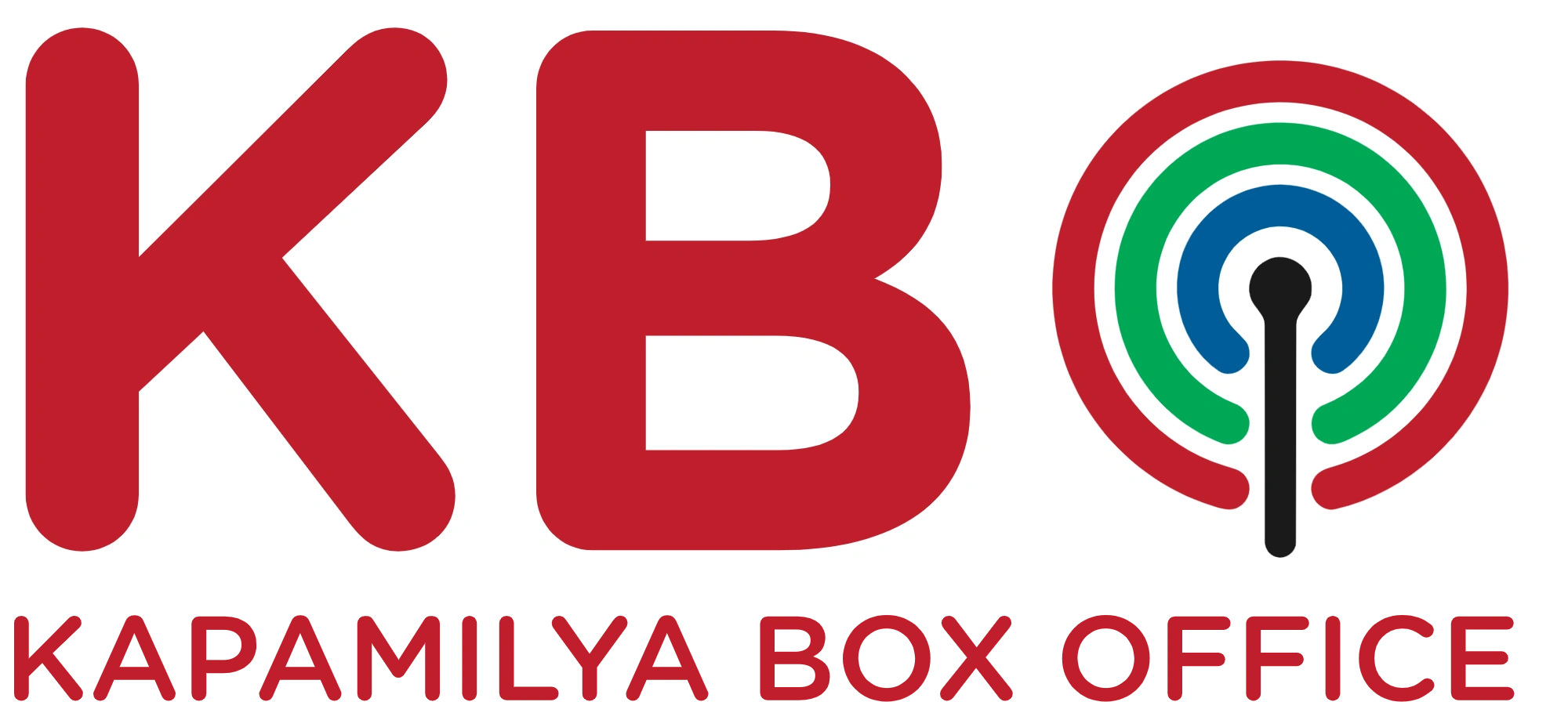
- Logo (2016–2020)
- Country: Philippines
- Network: ABS-CBN; Cinema One
- Headquarters: Quezon City, Philippines

Ownership
- Owner: ABS-CBN Convergence
- Sister channels: Cinema One; Cine Mo!; TeleRadyo; Knowledge Channel; Tag; Yey!

History
- Launched: March 2016; 10 years ago
- Closed: July 1, 2020; 5 years ago (broadcast franchise lapsed/expired)
- Replaced by: SMNI News Channel (UHF 43 Manila channel space)
- Former names: TVplus Xtra Channel

Kapamilya Box Office (KBO) was a Philippine pay-per-view television channel. It was initially launched in May 2015 as a pay-per-view channel for the historic boxing match between Manny Pacquiao and Floyd Mayweather Jr. Originally registered as the "TVplus Xtra Channel," it became inactive after the event. In April 2016, the channel was rebranded as KBO.

Kapamilya Box Office permanently ceased operations on June 30, 2020, due to a cease-and-desist order (ACDO) issued by the National Telecommunications Commission (NTC) and Solicitor General Jose Calida against ABS-CBN TV Plus following the expiration of its franchise. However, operations continued through Sky Cable via Sky pay-per-view and various platforms of The Filipino Channel.

== About ==
KBO's weekend programming included a movie marathon featuring films from the libraries of Star Cinema, Viva Films, Regal Films, independent film outfits, and various Hollywood studios, along with a simulcast of Myx (also available on Channel 12 as a free trial). Pay-per-view events, such as boxing matches and special events, were also part of its programming schedule.

== Quo warranto petition ==
On February 10, 2020, Solicitor General Jose Calida filed a quo warranto petition against ABS-CBN Corporation and its subsidiary ABS-CBN Convergence with the Supreme Court of the Philippines, alleging violations of their legislative franchise conditions, including the operations of KBO. ABS-CBN later clarified that, contrary to Calida's claims, all of its broadcast operations, including KBO, had received necessary government and regulatory approvals. On February 24, 2020, NTC Commissioner Gamaliel Cordoba stated that ABS-CBN would be fined ₱200 for operating the pay-per-view channel without established guidelines from the NTC.

On June 23, 2020, the Supreme Court of the Philippines dismissed the quo warranto petition to revoke ABS-CBN Corporation's franchise, stating that the petition was moot and academic since the franchise had already expired; thus, voiding the franchise ab initio would not change anything. However, the quo warranto petition filed against ABS-CBN Convergence Inc. for allegedly operating KBO illegally remains pending.

== ABS-CBN subscription multiplex on DTT ==
Channel	Video	Aspect	Short name	Programming	Note
1.01	480i	4:3	ABS-CBN	ABS-CBN	Commercial broadcast
1.02	480i	4:3	SPORTS+ACTION	S+A	Commercial broadcast
1.03	480i	4:3	CINEMO!	Cine Mo!	Encrypted; Commercial broadcast ^{2}
1.04	480i	4:3	YEY!	Yey!	Encrypted; Commercial broadcast ^{2}
1.05	480i	4:3	DZMM Teleradyo	DZMM TeleRadyo	Commercial broadcast
1.06	480i	4:3	KBO	Kapamilya Box Office	Pay per view (available only on ABS-CBN TVplus, not available on ABS-CBN TVplus Go)
1.31	240p	4:3	ABS-CBN OneSeg	ABS-CBN	1seg
