= TV5 Network =

Philippine media and entertainment company

TV5 Network Inc.
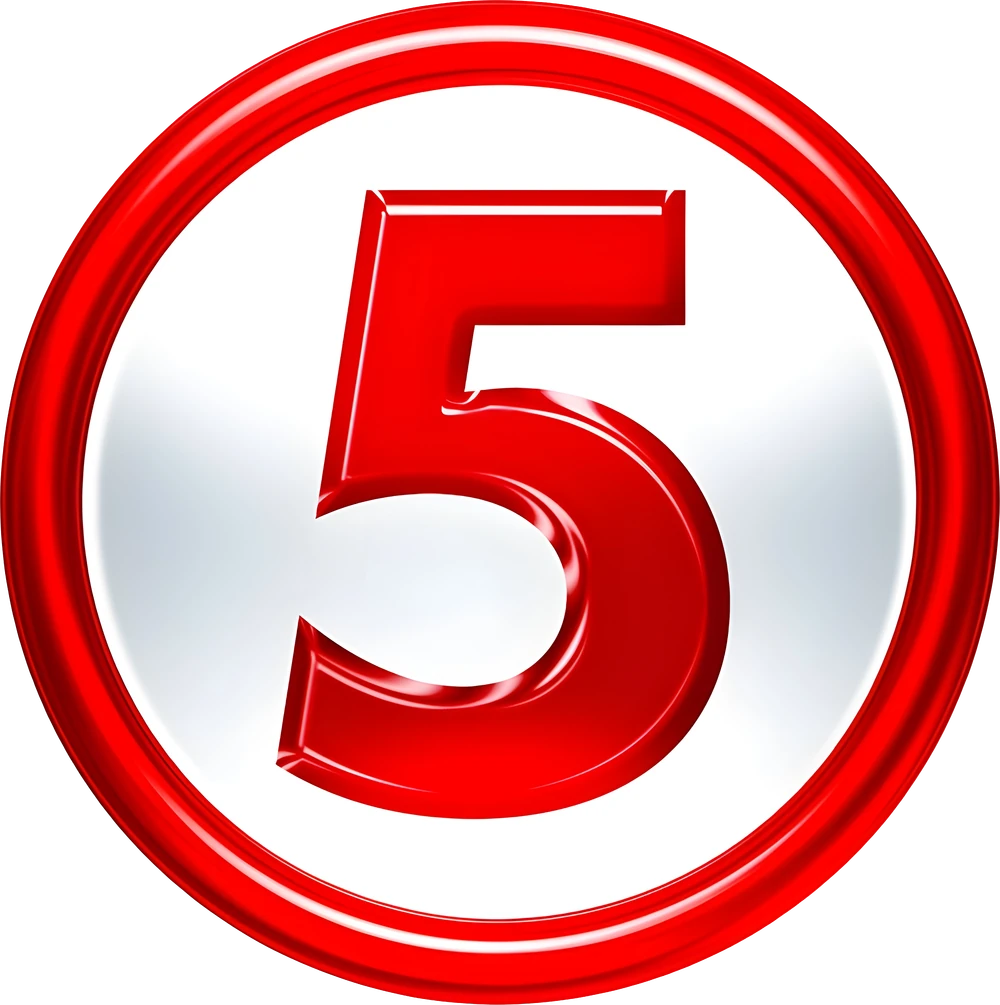
- Logo used since April 27, 2026, with the current "5" wordmark that has been used since April 4, 2010

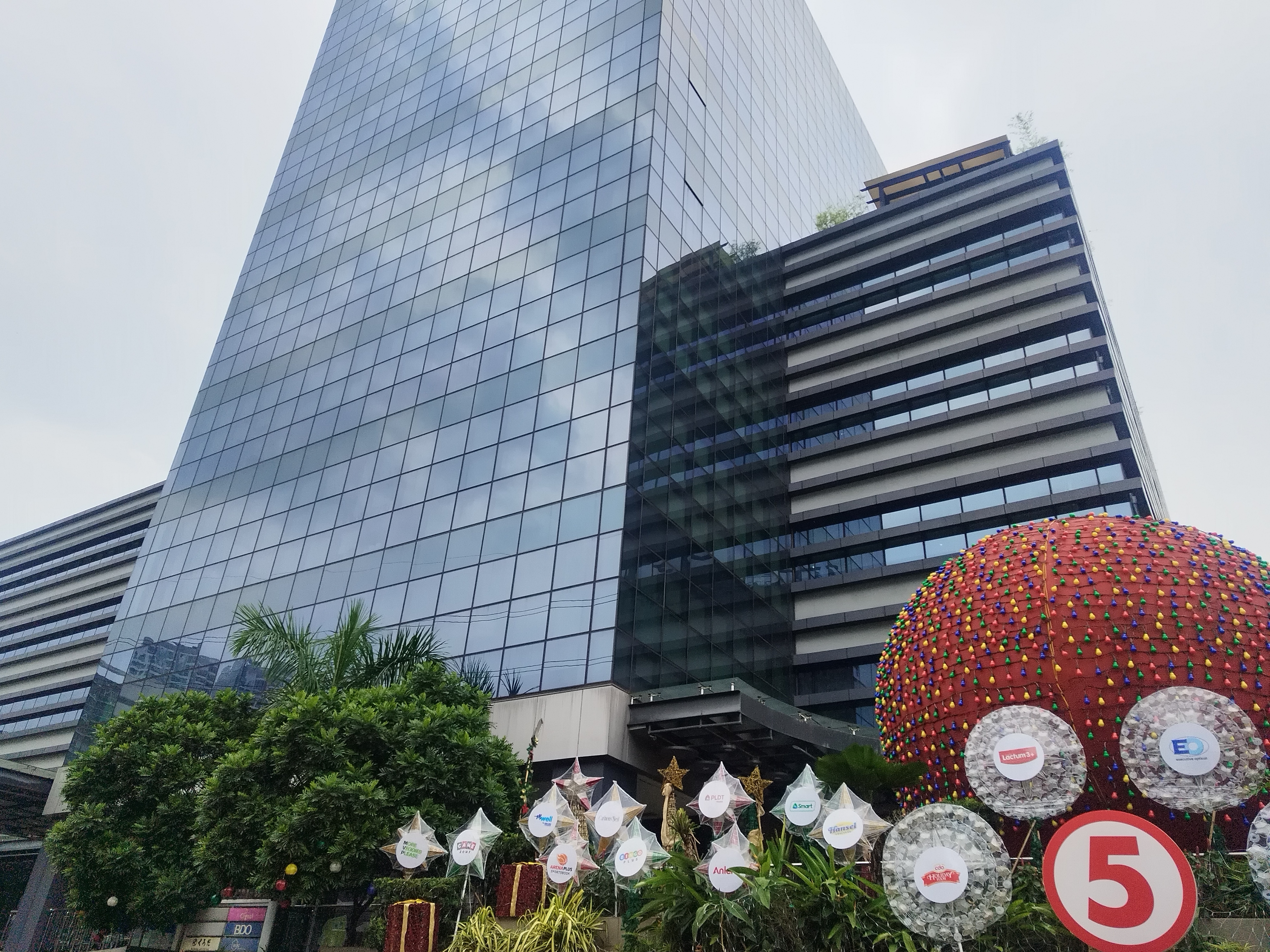
- TV5 Media Center at Reliance Street corner Sheridan Street, Mandaluyong, the headquarters of TV5 Network since 2013.
- Trade name: TV5; TV5 Network; TV5 Corporate; TV5 Group; Kapatid
- Formerly: Associated Broadcasting Corporation (1960–1972); ABC Development Corporation (1992–2015); Associated Broadcasting Company (trade name, 1992–2008/2010)
- Type: Subsidiary
- Industry: Mass media Entertainment
- Founded: August 4, 1958; 68 years ago (SEC No. : 0000014269 )
- Founder: Joaquin "Chino" Roces
- Headquarters: TV5 Media Center, Reliance cor. Sheridan Sts., Brgy. Highway Hills, Mandaluyong, Metro Manila, Philippines
- Area served: Worldwide
- Key people: Manuel V. Pangilinan (Chairman); Victorico P. Vargas (President and CEO); Dino M. Laurena (COO, Media 5); Pierre Buhay (CFO)
- Products: Television program Films; Music; Web portals
- Brands: TV5; One Sports; RPTV; Kapatid Channel; One News; One PH; One Sports+; PBA Rush; NBA TV Philippines; BuKo; UAAP Varsity Channel; True FM; Kapatid Channel International; AksyonTV International; Sulit TV; Kapatid Livestream
- Services: Broadcasting; Motion pictures TV production Cable television Internet; Streaming service Record label Satellite television Film distribution
- Revenue: ▲ ₱1.977 billion (FY 2022)
- Operating income: ▼ ₱909 million (FY 2022)
- Total assets: ▲ ₱9.56 billion (FY 2022)
- Total equity: ▲ ₱3.95 billion (FY 2022)
- Owner: MediaQuest Holdings, Inc. (29.13%); Upbeam Investments Inc. (28.87%); Telemedia Business Ventures Inc. (25%); Med Vision Resources Inc. (16.70%)
- Number of employees: 700+ (2018)
- Parent: BTF Holdings, Inc. (PLDT Beneficial Trust Fund)
- Divisions: Alagang Kapatid Foundation; TV5 Entertainment (Cignal Entertainment); Star Worx; MQ Worldwide; TV5 News; Pilipinas Global Network Ltd.; Regional5; Rescue5; Sports5 (One Sports)
- Subsidiaries: Media5 Marketing Corporation; MQ Digital; MQ Live; MQuest Music; MQ Studios; Nation Broadcasting Corporation; UXS, Inc.
- Website: tv5.com.ph

TV5 Network Inc., commonly referred to as TV5, is a Philippine media company headquartered in Mandaluyong, Metro Manila. It primarily operates in radio and television broadcasting, and manages several subsidiaries and affiliates in various media-related ventures. TV5 is owned by MediaQuest Holdings, a subsidiary of PLDT Beneficial Trust Fund (which is managed by some PLDT key personnel for the pension benefit of PLDT employees). The company is led by Manuel V. Pangilinan.

TV5 was founded on June 19, 1960, by the owner of The Manila Times Joaquin "Chino" Roces as Associated Broadcasting Corporation, The company launched its first radio station DZMT, Its first broadcast on television was launched in July 1962, and the television station was known as DZTM-TV Channel 5.

In 1990, the company became known as Associated Broadcasting Company or ABC Development Corporation led by businessman Edward Tan and Roces' son Edgardo, a group of new shareholders initiated efforts to restore the network's operations. In October 2003, ABC was acquired by a group led by businessman Antonio "Tonyboy" O. Cojuangco Jr.

On August 8, 2008, ABC was rebranded as TV5 as it entered a partnership with MPB Primedia Inc., a local company backed by Media Prima Berhad. On October 20, 2009, MediaQuest Holdings acquired ABC Development Corporation and its blocktimer MPB Primedia Inc. from a joint consortium led by former PLDT Chairman Antonio "Tony Boy" O. Cojuangco Jr. and Malaysia-based media conglomerate Media Prima Berhad. Manuel V. Pangilinan expressed that he had intended to acquire ABC as early as 1999. It then changed its corporate name to TV5 Network Inc. in 2015, when the network identity became TV5.

== History ==
=== 1960-1972: Founding of ABC ===
Joaquin "Chino" Roces, owner of The Manila Times, was granted a radio-TV franchise from Congress under Republic Act No. 2945 on June 19, 1960. He then founded the Associated Broadcasting Corporation (ABC), which became the seventh television network in the Philippines when it launched Channel 5 with the call sign DZTM-TV and established its first studios along Pasong Tamo in Makati in July 1962. ABC operated radio and television services from July 1962 until September 23, 1972, when President Ferdinand Marcos declared martial law. Both ABC and The Manila Times were shut down as a result.

=== 1990–2003: Revival after the revolution ===
Led by businessman Edward Tan and Roces' son Edgardo, a group of new shareholders initiated efforts to restore the network's operations. The Securities and Exchange Commission approved their application to increase capitalization and amend the Articles of Incorporation and bylaws of the Associated Broadcasting Company (ABC). The National Telecommunications Commission (NTC) later granted the group an operation permit.

ABC established its studio complex and transmitter tower in San Bartolome, Novaliches, Quezon City in 1990 and began test broadcasts by the end of 1991. On February 21, 1992, it officially returned to the air under the new corporate name, ABC Development Corporation. Its radio counterpart, Kool 106, was launched at the same time. It acquired a new franchise to operate on December 9, 1994, under Republic Act 7831 signed by then-President Fidel V. Ramos.

In 1999, the network ventured into UHF TV broadcasting after it was awarded the channel 47 frequency by the NTC and branded it on-air as ABC-47, but was short-lived for unknown reasons and remains inactive to this day. However in 2010, the frequency, along with the entire assets of former radio division Dream FM were acquired by, and has been licensed to Interactive Broadcast Media.

=== 2003–2009: Cojuangco era, rebranding as TV5 ===
In October 2003, ABC was acquired by a group led by businessman Antonio "Tonyboy" O. Cojuangco Jr.

In 2005, ABC received the Outstanding TV Station award at the KBP Golden Dove Awards, with several other programs on the network also earning honors in their respective categories.

In early 2007, ABC implemented a series of budget cuts, primarily directed toward its news department, resulting in 250 job cuts and the axing of the major 7:45 am news bulletin.

In 2008, ABC-5 was rebranded as TV5 as it entered a partnership with MPB Primedia Inc, a local company backed by Media Prima Berhad of Malaysia as part of a long-term strategy to make the station more competitive against largest media networks ABS-CBN and GMA Network. This caused a large increase in its ratings from 1.9% in July 2008 to 11.1% in September 2009.

=== 2009–2016: Acquisition by MediaQuest, expansion, relocation, and renaming ===
On October 20, 2009, Media Prima announced that it would be divesting its 70% share in TV5/MPB Primedia and selling it to the Philippine Long Distance Telephone Company's broadcasting arm, MediaQuest Holdings, Inc. as Media Prima had incurred losses during the 2008 financial crisis. MediaQuest also acquired Cojuangco-owned ABC Development Corporation and its television stations by the end of 2009. The two acquisitions were completed on March 2, 2010, as announced by PLDT chairman Manuel V. Pangilinan, who had previously intended to acquire ABC as early as 1999. TV5 was reformatted on April 4, 2010, with a new lineup of programming and branding as the "Kapatid" ("sibling") network. ABC's radio arm Dream FM was retained under Cojuangco management after the latter had transferred its ownership to Interactive Broadcast Media. By July 2011, Dream FM Network was closed, and its Manila station signed an airtime lease agreement with Ultrasonic Broadcasting System and relaunched as 106.7 Energy FM.

Upon acquisition, TV5 expressed interest in acquiring the 27.24% controlling share of Indosiar Karya Media to transform the network as the pan-regional multimedia leader in Southeast Asia. The agreement was to be reached by 2011, but it was never completed because Indosiar merged with Surya Citra Media, a subsidiary of Emtek, in 2013.

On October 1, 2010, TV5 took over the management of MediaQuest's Nation Broadcasting Corporation stations. DWFM was relaunched as a TV5-branded news radio station on November 8, 2010, and Radyo5 92.3 NewsFM and DWNB-TV were relaunched on February 21, 2011, as AksyonTV, a news channel based on TV5's newscast Aksyon.

In June 2011, Sports5 began a deal with the state-run Intercontinental Broadcasting Corporation to produce sports programming for the network under the brand AKTV. TV5 continued to use IBC-13's Broadcast City facilities for sports events after the block-time deal ended on May 31, 2023, as MediaQuest Holdings was a potential bidder for IBC-13's privatization.

In co-ownership with Pilipinas Global Network Ltd., international channels Kapatid TV5 and AksyonTV International were launched in April 2011. The channels were available in Europe, the Middle East, North Africa, Guam, and the United States.

TV5 expanded to social media with the online lifestyle site Kristn.com, the Pinoy online music portal Balut Radio, and the news video content site News5 Everywhere. Kristn.com and Balut Radio have been inactive since December 2014.

Rey Espinosa stepped down as ABC Development Corporation President and CEO on June 1, 2013, to pursue his new post as associate director of the First Pacific Company Ltd, PLDT's majority owner. He was replaced by Noel C. Lorenzana, the Head of the Individual Business for the PLDT Group.

TV5's transmitter and first studio complex in Novaliches, Quezon City. This is the former corporate headquarters of TV5 from 1990 until its transfer to TV5 Media Center in 2013.

By December 23, 2013, the network had relocated and begun broadcasting from new headquarters, a 6,000 square meter TV5 Media Center located in Reliance, Mandaluyong. This vacated Novaliches complex as well as its studios in Delta Theater (Quezon City), Broadway Centrum (New Manila), Marajo Tower (Bonifacio Global City) and the PLDT Locsin Building (Makati). The transmitter and corporate offices of TV5 remained in Novaliches, Quezon City. Phase 1 (News5 Center) was completed on the same day, while Phase 2 of the building (Entertainment Building, now the Launchpad Center) was completed in 2017. It houses TV5, and their sister companies Cignal Digital TV, Voyager Innovations, and Philex Mining.

After failure to acquire a stake in GMA Network, TV5's ultimate parent, PLDT, increased funding for TV5. PLDT's subsidiary, ePLDT, Inc., invested P6 billion in the form of Philippine Depositary Receipts (PDRs) in MediaQuest to sustain the growth of TV5 and affiliate Cignal TV. PLDT also looked to install new platforms and technology that would suit consumers' preferences. TV5 Chairman Manny Pangilinan predicted that TV5 would "break-even" by 2017.

In response to the process of shifting to digital terrestrial television, TV5 invested P500-700 million in the next four years in preparation for its shift to digital TV. Currently, TV5 and AksyonTV are conducting digital test broadcasts on channels 42 and 51, operated by TV5 affiliates Nation Broadcasting Corporation and Mediascape, respectively. It also plans to convert its UHF stations that operate TV5 and AksyonTV, to DTV transmitters.

In December 2014, ABC Development Corporation partnered with Singapore-based studio Brand New Media to launch a multi-channel datacasting service, 4ME Philippines. 4ME will feature original content, produced both in the Philippines and internationally, for a network of lifestyle channels covering food, health, fashion, tech, comedy, travel, home, entertainment, celebrity, sport, outdoor adventure, and music. With the domain name TV4ME.ph, 4ME was targeted to launch in 2015.

In 2015, the company rebranded from ABC Development Corporation to TV5 Network, Inc.

TV5 Network, Inc. also launched its digital library of original online content called Digital5, using the company's online portals to produce exclusive programs that cater to different audiences on different platforms.

On August 3, 2015, TV5 Network, Inc. and Cignal TV collaborated with Viva Communications to form an entertainment network called the Sari-Sari Channel (or Sari-Sari Network; SSN) that would air programs and films from both the Viva portfolio and TV5. By October, TV5 partnered with SSN, agreeing to let the latter handle the production of all the entertainment programs of TV5, with Viva's Vic del Rosario Jr. appointed as the network's chief entertainment strategist. The partnership ended in June 2016 due to a lack of success.

After President Rodrigo Duterte came into office on June 30, 2016, many news anchors such as Cherie Mercado and Martin Andanar left the network to work for his administration.

=== 2016–present: Renewed strategy, pandemic, and partnership with Nine Media/RPN ===
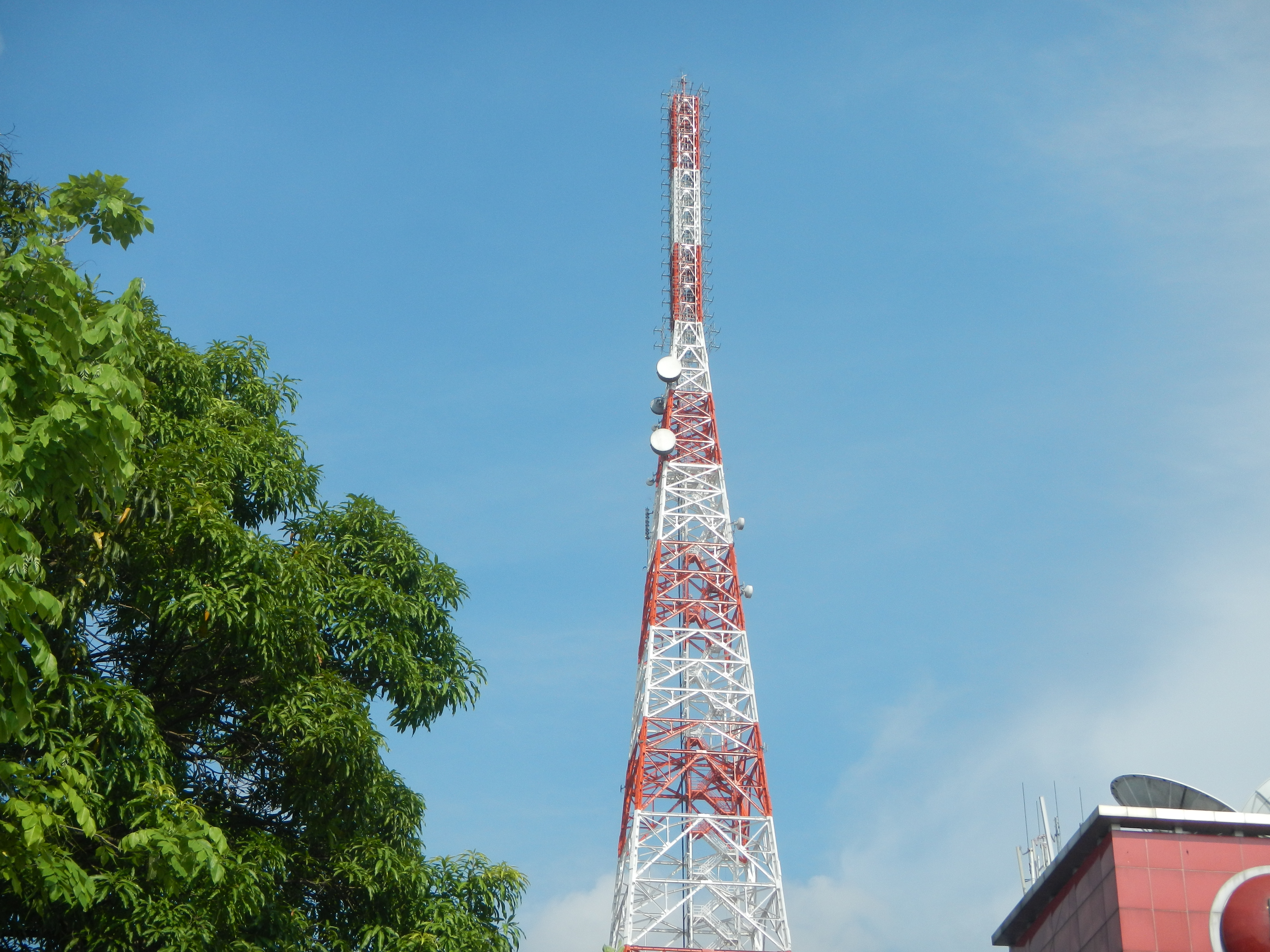
TV5's transmitter in Novaliches, Quezon City, 2016

On October 1, 2016, Media5 president and former Gilas Pilipinas and PBA head coach Chot Reyes became the network's officer-in-charge, replacing the network's president for four years, Noel Lorenzana, who retired from his position on September 30. In the same year, the network halted production on entertainment programs after it shifted its strategy toward broadcasting American television shows and films dubbed in Filipino, and made a deal with filmmaker Brillante Mendoza to produce television films and series for the network. Sebastian Duterte, son of Philippine President Rodrigo Duterte, was recruited in January 2017 to star in the unscripted travel show Lakbai for his appeal to the millennial market. By February 2017, more than 100 employees were laid off on short notice, most of whom were members of the ABC Employees Union.

On February 17, 2018, TV5 launched its new slogan, "Get It on 5!". Along the launch, the network also started its five-brand strategy, consisting of News5 (News), ESPN5 (Sports), On5 (Entertainment and other content), D5 Studio (Digital), and the newly revived Studio5 (Films and Originals). By March, the network made a deal with Netflix to stream its new action series Amo, directed by Mendoza, becoming the first Philippine-produced series on the platform.

However, after retrenchment and privatization, TV5 retrenched 700 employees and stopped the production of TV5 sports and news programs (including ESPN5 and News5), its last TV5-produced program (including News and sports channel), on October 29, 2018, as TV5 started outsourcing news, sports and entertainment programs from Cignal TV and News5's entertainment and news department when TV5 took over the entire channel's airtime.

On October 30, 2018, TV5 announced the axing of ESPN5 and News5, as TV5 Network took over the entire network's airtime. More than 700 employees were retrenched, effectively dissolves TV5's sports department.

In October 2018, TV5 was acquired by MediaQuest Holdings and discontinued the use of the TV5 Novaliches facilities.

On April 22, 2019, TV5 Network was granted a 25-year legislative franchise extension under Republic Act No. 11320, which lapsed into law after 30 days of inaction by President Duterte. The law grants TV5 Network a franchise to construct, install, operate, and maintain, for commercial purposes, radio broadcasting stations and television stations, including digital television systems, with the corresponding facilities such as relay stations, throughout the Philippines.

After the retirement of Chot Reyes as TV5's president and CEO, he was replaced by Media5 President (TV5's sales and marketing arm) Jane Basas.

On February 4, 2020, Robert P. Galang was appointed as the new president and CEO of TV5 Network and Cignal TV, replacing Basas, who was appointed as the new Chief Marketing Officer of Smart Communications.

On August 15, 2020, TV5 Network announced a partnership with its sister company, Cignal TV, to become TV5's main content provider. This focus on the network's programming efforts signaled the willingness of TV5 to compete again with the GMA Network, TV5's longtime rival among other TV networks in the Philippines after the expiration of the congressional franchise of ABS-CBN in May 2020. In 2021, TV5 and rival network ABS-CBN signed a deal that lets ABS-CBN programs to be broadcast in TV5 along with its own shows and also released a new cable channel named BuKo that airs comedy shows which is only available in Cignal. TV5 also released a new digital TV set-top box called Sulit TV, which transmits TV5's digital frequencies as well as other available digital channels, competing with ABS-CBN TV Plus and GMA Affordabox.

In September of the same year, the University Athletic Association of the Philippines (UAAP) inked a deal with Cignal to launch the UAAP Varsity Channel to air UAAP basketball and volleyball events simulcast on TV5 and One Sports.

Since January 24, 2021, TV5 aired selected programming produced by ABS-CBN Studios following the shutdown of its free-to-air network. Programs included ASAP XP (2021–present, now hookup with All TV since 2026), Primetime Bida and Yes Weekend! (select programs only, 2021–present, now hookup with All TV since 2024), FPJ: Da King (2021–2023, now returned on GMA Network as FPJ sa GMA since 2025), It's Showtime (2022–2023, now moved on both All TV and GMA Network since 2024), Nag-aapoy Na Damdamin and Pira-Pirasong Paraiso (2023–2024 as part of Kapamilya Gold and reruns in 2026), Magandang Buhay (2023–2024, later moved on All TV from 2024 to 2026), Rated Korina (2023–present, originally by Brightlight Productions when the show transferred to TV5 from October 24, 2020 to June 16, 2023, now hookup with All TV since 2025), Sunday Blockbusters (2024), and Blockbusters sa Umaga (2026–present, hookup with A2Z and All TV). TV5 suspended the airing of newly released ABS-CBN content from January 2 to June 21, 2026, due to a financial dispute that was later settled.

In June 2022, ABS-CBN engaged in advanced talks with TV5's parent company, MediaQuest Holdings, to allow its resources to combine after Villar Group-backed Advanced Media Broadcasting System acquired ABS-CBN's former frequency. Operations were slated to begin in October 2022 as ALLTV-2, becoming the flagship station of ALLTV. On August 10, 2022, ABS-CBN and MediaQuest Holdings signed a "convertible note agreement" for the ABS-CBN's investment into TV5 Network. ABS-CBN acquired 34.99% of TV5's common shares, with an option to increase its stake to 49.92% within the following eight years, with MediaQuest remaining TV5's controlling shareholder with 64.79% of its common shares. Meanwhile, MediaQuest Holdings executed a "debt instruments agreement," in which they would acquire a 38.88% minority stake of ABS-CBN's cable TV arm Sky Cable Corporation through Cignal TV, with an option to acquire an additional 61.12% of Sky Cable shares within the following eight years. After ABS-CBN and TV5 had a partnership deal, the House of Representatives set a briefing, and SAGIP Representative Rodante Marcoleta commented that TV5 violated the broadcasting franchise with the ABS-CBN deal. The scheduled briefing was canceled at the last minute. On August 24, the two broadcasting companies agreed to pause their closing preparations for the deal, following concerns from politicians and some government agencies. On September 1, 2022, both parties announced the termination of the proposed investment.

On February 1, 2023, Guido R. Zaballero was appointed president and chief executive officer of TV5 Network. Zaballero, formerly the product manager of Smart Communications' Talk 'N Text cellular service and the vice president and head of marketing for Cignal TV, assumed the position following the retirement of Robert P. Galang, who headed Cignal TV and TV5 since 2020. Basas assumed the post of president and CEO of Cignal TV, concurrently with her role as the president and CEO of MediaQuest.

On April 1, 2023, the high-definition feed of TV5 was launched on Cignal Channel 15 (HD), as announced on March 21, 2023.

On April 16, 2023, the main channel switched its airing on the channel feed and its programming to a widescreen format (16:9), as opposed to a full-screen format (4:3).

In June 2023, the comedy trio of Tito Sotto, Vic Sotto, and Joey de Leon (TVJ) signed a "long-term" agreement with MediaQuest to produce content for TV5 and other MediaQuest properties. On July 1, 2023, TVJ's noontime variety show, E.A.T., premiered on TV5 and eventually returned to its original name, Eat Bulaga!

In October 2023, TV5 President Guido Zaballero announced that the broadcast of the PBA games would be transferred to A2Z, with TV5's programming focusing more on entertainment and news programs. That same year, TV5 entered into an acquired agreement with Nine Media Corporation (NMC) to broadcast Eat Bulaga! on Saturdays and select PBA games on Saturdays and Sundays, both on CNN Philippines, starting January 6, 2024 to expand channel's weekend programming lineup.

On February 1, 2024, following the closure of CNN Philippines, TV5 launched a new free-to-air channel RPTV in partnership with Nine Media and Radio Philippines Network (RPN). Meanwhile, Nine Media retains as a majority control of RPN after 10 years of being a network's content provider, with TV5 took over the entire RPN's airtime.

On November 4, 2024, TV5 entered an airtime lease with Bright Star Broadcasting Network Corporation for the transfer of its radio division, True FM (formerly Radyo5) to 105.9 FM. Before this, Radyo5 was on NBC's 92.3 FM from November 8, 2010, to November 3, 2024, until Philippine Collective Media Corporation took over the operations of this frequency and rebranded as Favorite Music Radio.

On November 3, 2026, Zaballero who has spent nearly 14 years with the MediaQuest group and led TV5 since February 2023, is stepping down from his leadership position for personal reasons as president and CEO of TV5 with Ricky Vargas assuming the transitional role.

== Broadcast assets ==
=== TV5 ===
TV5 or simply 5 (formerly known as ABC) is one of the major television networks in the Philippines and the flagship TV network. Founded in July 1962, it is branded as the Kapatid (Sibling) Network in reference to the company's logo. Its headquarters are at the TV5 Media Center in Mandaluyong and alternative studios and transmitting facility at the TV5 Broadcasting Complex in Novaliches, Quezon City.

=== One Sports ===
One Sports is a TV5 Network Inc.'s sports channel with Nation Broadcasting Corporation (NBC) as its primary content provider, which aired on its flagship station, UHF channel 41, and was launched on March 8, 2020. One Sports serves as a sports channel for TV5 with its programs primarily produced by its sports division of the same name. It was formerly called 5 Plus, when it was launched on January 13, 2019, and AksyonTV, a Filipino-language news channel launched by TV5 in 2011–2019. It is also available in most satellite and cable TV systems.

=== RPTV ===
RPTV is a free-to-air television channel jointly owned and operated by TV5 Network, Inc., (through its parent company MediaQuest Holdings, Inc., media arm of PLDT Beneficial Trust Fund) and Nine Media Corporation, through an airtime lease agreement with Radio Philippines Network (RPN). Launched on February 1, 2024, on RPN VHF Channel 9 Manila, replacing CNN Philippines.

=== True FM ===
True FM (formerly Radyo5) is a collective name for the news/talk FM radio stations of the Nation Broadcasting Corporation. The stations' all-news format is co-branded with News5, the news department of the television channel TV5. The first one to adopt the format is DWFM 92.3 FM on October 1, 2010 (only to be moved to Bright Star-owned DWLA 105.9 MHz in Metro Manila on November 4, 2024, after the former's acquisition by PCMC), followed by DYNC (now DYFM) 101.9 FM Cebu on November 12, 2012, and DXFM 101.9 FM Davao (only to be moved to Interactive Broadcast Media-owned DXET 106.7 MHz in Davao on November 4, 2024, after the former's acquisition by PCMC) on December 3, 2012, with other relay and affiliate stations serving Cagayan de Oro, Tacloban, and Ormoc.

=== Other notes ===
Most of the assets containing cable channels and their related content are handled by Cignal TV, TV5 Network's sister company.

== Internet and social media ==
=== News5 Digital ===
News5 Digital
- Former name: News5 Everywhere
- Website type: News website Online streaming
- Available in: Filipino; English
- Headquarters: TV5 Media Center, Reliance St., corner Sharidan St., Mandaluyong, Metro Manila
- Country of origin: Philippines
- Area served: Worldwide
- Owner: TV5 Network Inc.
- Key people: Patrick Paez (OIC for Head of News and Information); Jackie Sierda (Head, News Operations); Mary Grace Navarro (Head, News Production)
- Parent: MQ Digital
- Website: news.tv5.com.ph
- Launched: May 3, 2013; 13 years ago
- Current status: Active

News5 Digital (News5.com.ph), formerly known as News5 Everywhere, is the official news portal, online video and audio content management platform, and Social TV of TV5. It also serves as an online and on-demand streaming portal for TV5 and AksyonTV as well as an online citizen journalism portal for TV5 News.

=== One Sports ===
One Sports (OneSports.ph) is the official sports webpage of TV5 Network, Inc. in the Philippines, in conjunction with One Sports. Its content draws on the resources of both local and international sports news.

=== MQ Digital ===
MQ Digital, an online programming division of TV5, provides an array of online-exclusive content with various genres that can be viewed on all platforms through the online portals of TV5, One Sports, News5 Digital, and GG Network.

=== Kapatid Livestream ===
Kapatid Livestream
- Website type: Web-based channel
- Available in: Filipino (main); English (secondary)
- Headquarters: TV5 Media Center, Reliance St., corner Sharidan St., Mandaluyong, Metro Manila, Philippines
- Country of origin: Philippines
- Area served: Philippines (Live Streaming only); Asia; Europe; Australia; New Zealand
- Owner: TV5 Network Inc.
- Key people: Manuel V. Pangilinan (Chairman); Victorico P. Vargas (President and CEO); Dino M. Laurena (COO)
- Industry: Entertainment; Mass media
- Parent: MQ Digital
- Website: tv5.com.ph youtube.com/TV5%20Philippines/live
- Registration: Required
- Launched: April 1, 2024; 2 years ago
- Current status: Active

Kapatid Livestream (formerly known as Kapatid Online) is a web-based channel owned and operated by MQ Digital, a division of TV5 Network Inc., which is owned by MediaQuest Holdings and live streams on Facebook and YouTube. It airs original programming from TV5, One Sports, RPTV, One News, One PH and Kapatid Channel and it airs of TV5's classic shows. Live streaming of shows on both platforms is available worldwide. Kapatid Online competed with ABS-CBN's Kapamilya Online Live and GMA Network's Kapuso Stream.

Online streaming on TV5's official website and Kapatid Livestream, does not include acquired programming, Viu original, and movie blocks which aired on TV, as the live-streaming is only focused on network-produced content due to copyright restrictions.

== International presence ==
=== Pilipinas Global Network Ltd. ===
Pilipinas Global Network Ltd.
- Logo used since 2011
- Type: Subsidiary
- Industry: Broadcasting
- Founded: March 16, 2011; 15 years ago
- Headquarters: TV5 Media Center, Reliance cor. Sheridan Sts., Mandaluyong, Metro Manila, Philippines
- Area served: Worldwide
- Key people: Manuel V. Pangilinan (Chairman); Ernesto D. Sta. Maria, Jr. (President and CEO)
- Products: Television; Radio; Internet; Streaming service
- Services: Television
- Owner: MediaQuest Holdings; (PLDT Beneficial Trust Fund)
- Parent: TV5 Network, Inc.
- Website: pgnl.ph

TV5's international presence is overseen by Pilipinas Global Network Ltd. (PGN), a joint subsidiary of TV5 Network Inc. (40%) and its parent the Philippine Long Distance Telephone Company (60%), Founded on March 16, 2011, at the British Virgin Islands, it has two subsidiaries of its own, PGN (Canada) Ltd., based in British Columbia, and the PGN (US) LLC., incorporated through the Delaware General Corporation Law and currently based on California. Through these subsidiaries, PGN acts as the sole and exclusive distributor and licensee of the programs, shows, films, and channels of TV5 through international syndication and its owned-and-operated channels, the Kapatid Channel International and AksyonTV International.

Before this, TV5 (formerly ABC-5) aired its programs through an international channel, The Mabuhay Channel, and its counterpart in Canada. The Mabuhay Channel features a wide array of programming from movies, music, sports, entertainment, and current affairs to children's and lifestyle programming from ABC-5 as well as PTV-4, RPN-9 (Now RPTV-9), IBC-13, the CCI Asia Group, Net 25, Viva Entertainment and Regal Entertainment. It was founded on July 22, 2004, by Philippine Multimedia Systems, Inc. (PMSI), the then-operator of Dream Satellite TV and then-sister company of ABC-5 (PMSI and ABC-5 are owned by Antonio "Tonyboy" Cojuangco Jr.). It was closed on August 18, 2008, 9 days after ABC-5's rebrand to TV5 and due to the channel's pullout from Dish Network.

- Kapatid Channel International
- AksyonTV International
- PBA Rush
- 105.9 True FM (International)

== Defunct services ==
=== AKTV ===
AKTV was a primetime sports programming block produced by the Sports5 division of TV5 and was aired on the state-run Intercontinental Broadcasting Corporation (IBC). Formed by a block time agreement on February 28, 2011, it was launched on June 5, 2011, by an AKTV Run at the SM Mall of Asia in Pasay. Due to high airtime cost and low ratings caused by the impending privatization of IBC, AKTV ceased airing in May 2013 although TV5 continues to use IBC's Broadcast City facilities for its sports programming as TV5's parent, MediaQuest Holdings, has a potential bid for its privatization that was aimed to happen by 2016. MediaQuest could not join the privatization bid due to ownership rules and regulations that MediaQuest owns TV5 and AksyonTV.

=== Dream FM Network ===
Dream FM Network (formerly known as Kool 106), the original radio division of TV5 Network, was established dating back to its reopening in February 1992 as ABC Development Corporation. With its flagship station DWET 106.7 FM Manila (now airing as Energy FM which is owned by Ultrasonic Broadcasting System), DYET 106.7 FM Cebu (now DYQC 106.7 FM, airing as 1067 Home Radio under the auspices of Aliw Broadcasting Corporation), and DXET 106.7 FM Davao (now owned by Interactive Broadcast Media and is being leased by TV5 through its affiliate Nation Broadcasting Corporation, currently airing as True FM since November 2024), it undergoes multiple format, including Hot AC, Top 40 hits, Original Pilipino Music and sometimes, Latin music. Upon acquisition of the conglomerate by Antonio "Tonyboy" O. Cojuangco Jr., the radio network flipped its format into a smooth jazz format, added up with R&B, Soul, Bossa Nova and House, which remained unchanged after its TV counterpart ABC-5 reformatted in 2008. The radio network was not part of the acquisition of ABC Development Corporation by MediaQuest Holdings in 2010 since the latter has Nation Broadcasting Corporation's FM stations, which later branded to News5 as Radyo5 NewsFM. Dream FM was retained under the Cojuangco management and operated by former ABC stockholder Anton Lagdameo, with Cojuangco already having transferred ABC's entire FM stations to Interactive Broadcast Media (IBMI). The majority of Dream FM stations closed in June 2011 as Ultrasonic Broadcasting System signed an agreement with IBMI, in which it will lease the stations DWET 106.7 FM Manila and reformed on July 1 as Energy FM Manila (Energy FM was formerly on DWKY 91.5 FM, now 91.5 Win Radio). Only DYKP retained its operations as Boracay Beach Radio.

=== Balut Radio ===
Balut Radio was an Internet radio service of TV5 Network Inc. Founded on April 1, 2013, it featured OPM and international music channels, as well as news and sports channels powered by News5 as well as radio channels that can be customized by users. In September 2014, Balut Radio ceased operations.

=== Kristn ===
Kristn, (kristn.com) also known as Hitlist by Kristn, was an online lifestyle hub of TV5. It featured exclusive content on food & dining, movies, tech & gaming, music & events, men's lifestyle, and celebrity features. Active from December 2012 to January 2015, the website was dissolved after the launch of a similar service, TV4ME Philippines.

=== TV4ME Philippines ===
TV4ME Philippines was a digital advertorial datacasting service operated under the joint venture of TV5 and Brand New Media, a Singapore-based online content provider. It offered original programs that range from food, health, travel, shopping, motoring, property, business, finance, careers, sports, hobbies, and technology. This service is currently inactive due to financial constraints.

=== Catsup ===
Catsup (pronounced as Catch-Up) was a digital-exclusive subchannel of TV5 Network available only in Manila, where its digital signal is being tested. It was launched under test broadcast on June 1, 2015, airing reruns of top-rated programs from TV5 and selected Sports5 coverages. It also aired replays of selected News5 documentaries and classic Filipino movies on weekends. Catsup ceased broadcasting on February 1, 2017, due to low ratings, programming redundancies and lack of advertising support.

=== InterAksyon ===
InterAksyon (interaksyon.com) is an online news portal of TV5 launched in 2011. It features articles and editorials from respected journalists and News5 reporters. The website also developed the TNAV (Traffic Navigator), which features real-time traffic updates from the MMDA. The service was under the management of News5 from its launch until March 31, 2018. Currently, the PhilStar Media Group, another company under MediaQuest, handles the site under its own digital group.

=== AksyonTV ===
AksyonTV (Action TV) was a news and sports television network co-owned by TV5 Network and Nation Broadcasting Corporation. Founded on February 21, 2011, AksyonTV's programs comprised a combination of live news reports, documentaries, sports, and current affairs programming. Its existing lineup of programming draws upon TV5's resources and its news partners. It also aired simulcast programs of Radyo5 92.3 News FM and news programs of TV5. The channel was shut down on January 12, 2019, and it was replaced by 5 Plus. AksyonTV's sports programs were carried by 5 Plus, while Radyo5 simulcast programs moved to the new stand-alone satellite channel under the Radyo5 brand before the launch of One PH, exclusively on Cignal.

=== 5 Plus ===
5 Plus was a commercial sports terrestrial television network co-owned by TV5 Network and Nation Broadcasting Corporation. Named after its parent station, it served as a complementary channel for 5 with its programs primarily produced by ESPN5. 5 Plus was launched on January 13, 2019, replacing AksyonTV, until it ceased its broadcast on March 7, 2020, to give way for One Sports.

=== ESPN5 ===
ESPN5 (ESPN5.com) is the official sports webpage of ESPN in the Philippines, in conjunction with One Sports. Its content draws upon the resources of both ESPN (for global articles) and One Sports (for Philippines-originating articles). As early as March 2020, ESPN International did not renew its content partnership agreement with TV5/Cignal, prompting the latter to rebrand its sports channel to One Sports and drop ESPN5-branded programming from its lineup.

== Other assets ==
=== Divisions ===
- TV5 Entertainment
- TV5 News
- One News
- One PH
- Star Worx TV5
- Sports5
- MQ Digital

==== MQ Studios ====
Studio5 Inc.
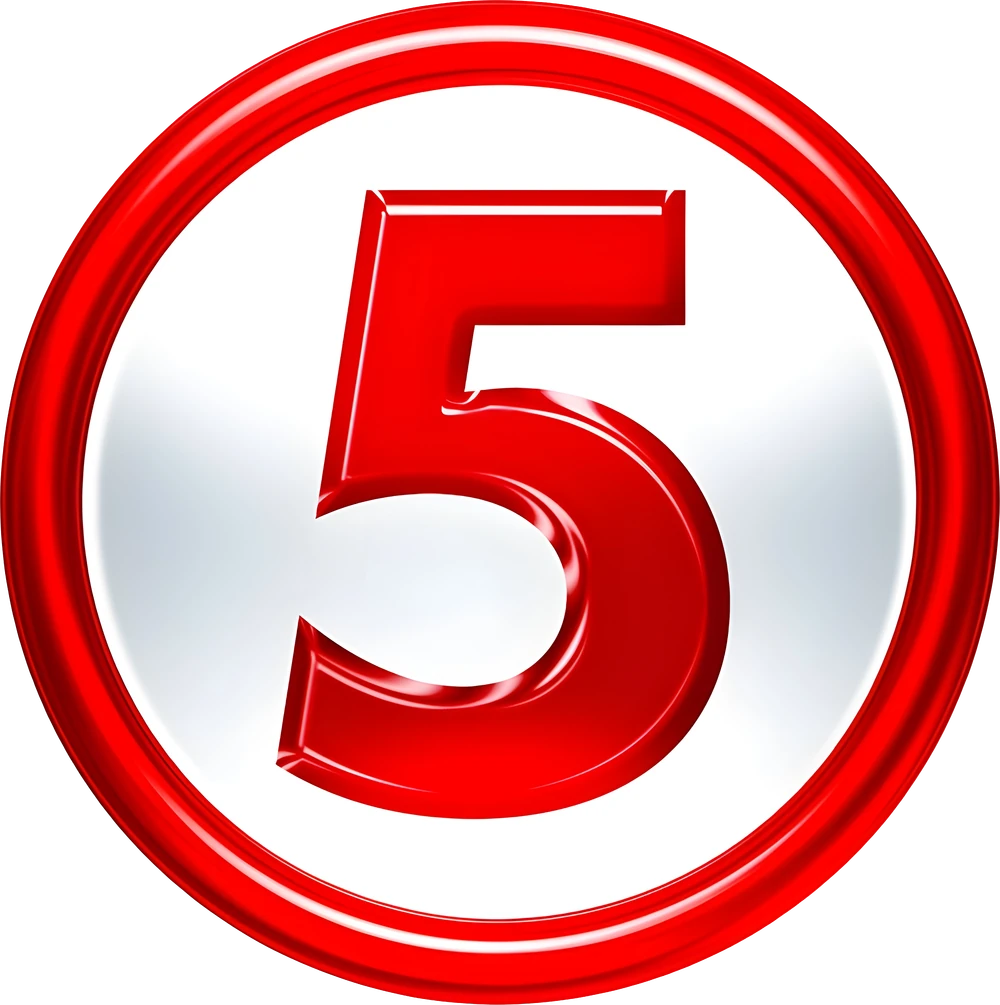
- Trade name: MQ Studios
- Formerly: Studio5 (2010–2024)
- Type: Subsidiary
- Industry: Film distribution; Film production; Television production
- Founded: July 13, 2005; 21 years ago
- Headquarters: TV5 Media Center, Reliance St., cor. Sharidan St., Mandaluyong, Metro Manila, Philippines
- Area served: Worldwide
- Key people: Manuel V. Pangilinan (Chairman); Ricky Vargas (President and CEO); Atty. Ray C. Espinosa (Director)
- Products: Home videos; Motion pictures; Music recordings; Post production services; Screenplays; Television series
- Parent: TV5 Network Inc.
- Divisions: TV5 Entertainment; Sari-Sari Network; UXS, Inc.

Studio5, Inc., doing business as MQ Studios (formerly Studio5) is a Philippine film, television production and distribution company headquartered in Mandaluyong, Philippines It is one of the largest film studios in the Philippines, along with Star Cinema, GMA Pictures, Viva Films and Regal Entertainment. Its films include Lasponggols, Pepot Artista, and Room Boy (2005), Tulad ng Dati (2006), Rosario (2010), Penduko and GomBurZa (2023), The Kingdom (2024) and Manila's Finest (2025).

=== Subsidiaries and affiliates ===
- BusinessWorld
- Cignal TV (Mediascape Inc.)
  - Cignal
  - CignalPlay
  - SatLite
- Cinegear, Inc. (65.7%)
- Epik Studios Inc. (35%)
- Media5 Marketing Corporation (Media5)
- MQuest Ventures
  - MQ Live
  - MQ Music
  - MavenPro
  - TVJ Productions (51%)
  - WinQuest Productions (51%)
- Nation Broadcasting Corporation (51%)
- Straight Shooters
- The Philippine Star
- Sari-Sari Network, Inc. (50%)
- Sulit TV
- UXS, Inc. (formerly Unitel Productions) (30%)

=== Corporate social responsibility ===
- Alagang Kapatid Foundation
- PLDT-Smart Foundation
- One Meralco Foundation
