= Digital5 =

Philippine media subsidiary

MQ Digital
- Formerly: Digital5 (2015-2016); D5 Studio (2016-2023)
- Company type: Subsidiary
- Industry: Digital media Technology; New media
- Founded: March 2015; 11 years ago
- Headquarters: TV5 Media Center, Reliance St., cor. Sheridan St., Mandaluyong, Metro Manila, Philippines
- Area served: Worldwide
- Key people: Manuel V. Pangilinan (Chairman); Dino M. Laurena (COO, Media 5); Judd Gallares (Chief Science Officer)
- Products: Online portal, Mobile Applications, Online Games, Digital terrestrial television
- Parent: TV5 Network Inc. (MediaQuest Holdings)
- Website: TV5; One Sports; News5

MQ Digital (formerly Digital5 and D5 Studio) is the digital media and online portal arm of TV5 Network Inc. wholly owned subsidiary of MediaQuest Holdings interactive applications in the television, mobile and web application, online portal, gaming industry, and produces video and livestream content for social media. Its headquarters are located at TV5 Media Center in Mandaluyong, Philippines.

It produces content (also partnering with some productions) that will can be viewed on the network's online portals. MQ Digital's content include entertainment together with TV5. lifestyle, travel, news, business, sports, comedy, etc. It also managed the news portal, together with News5 Digital. MQ Digital also produced shows for GG Network, the first online network catered for electronic gamers.

== Products and services ==
Websites

- News5.com.ph

In 2013, TV5 launched News5.com.ph. In the same year, the site won several awards at the 2nd Social TV Awards including.

- TV5.com.ph
- OneSports.ph
- OneNews.ph
- Kapatid Livestream

On April 1, 2024, TV5 launched Kapatid Livestream a web-based channel competed with ABS-CBN's Kapamilya Online Live and GMA Network's Kapuso Stream. It airs original programming from TV5, BuKo and Sari-Sari Channel. Kapatid Livestream became accessible worldwide and streams 24-hours a day.

Broadcast applications

- Sulit TV is a digital receiver that delivers Digital Terrestrial Transmission as well as Over-the-Top (OTT) internet-based content and applications. The device was released on September 10, 2021.

== MQ Digital Programs ==
These are the programs produced by Digital5 (past, ongoing and upcoming) with its description

=== D5.studio ===
Aside from original programs, online re-runs of past and present TV5 shows are also uploaded in the website. Whenever possible, select Digital5 Programs are brought to TV5 as catch-up episodes (with short length online videos of the shows being combined for television and rearranged with playout to/from commercial breaks).

- Baon Fix (Host: Patti Grandidge / Description: Quick Tips on Making a "Baon")
- Bloom (Hosts: Mika Martinez, Maggie Wilson / Genre: Women Magazine)
- Clash of Class (Description: Battle and Comparison)
- Good Times with Mo: The Podcast (Hosts: Mo Twister and various co-hosts / Genre: Talk show on love & sex)
- Jinrilationships: A Survival Guide to the Dating Life (Host: Jinri Park / Genre: Romantic-comedy)
- Like A Bossing (Host: Anthony Pangilinan / Description: Magazine show about Entrepreneurs)
- Kwentong Barbero (Mang Ponso / Genre: Typical comedy)
- Phenoms (Starring: Kiefer Ravena and Alyssa Valdez / Genre: Reality)
- Spinnr Sessions (Genre: Live Music Sessions from various music artists)
- Tanods (Starring: Martin Escudero, Jun Sabayton, Bea Benedicto, Jinri Park / Genre: Sitcom)
- Forever Sucks (Starring: Jasmine Curtis-Smith, JC Santos, Ian Batherson / Genre: Drama)
- Rock U (Genre: Animated series)
- Bolero Rap Battles (Genre: Rap Battle League)

=== News5.com.ph ===
- Kontrabando/Duty, Devotion and Service (Hosts: Ramon Bautista, Lourd de Veyra, Jun Sabayton and RA Rivera with Generoso Cupal, Bea Benedicto, Bart Bartolome, Epe Salas and Mackhie Suela (occasionally with Nikki Veron Cruz and Angel Francisco) / Genre: News Satire)
- NewsRoom 5 (Hosts: Branden Milla and Bea Benedicto / Description: Human Interest Stories)

=== Sports5.ph ===
Philippine Basketball Association and Philippine Superliga games live streaming are also available in this website, with no commercial breaks.

- The Bro Show (Hosts: Jason Webb, Richard del Rosario and Mico Halili / Description: Sports talk show)
- Kicksplorer (Host: James Velasquez / Description: Kicks & Shoes Review)
- Nth Degree (Hosts: Dominic Uy and Kevin Limjoco / Description: Consumer Reviews)
- No Holds Barred: We Ask The Questions, You Get The Answers (Host: Quinito Henson / Description: In-depth interviews with sports personalities)
- On Cam (Hosts: Apple David, Mara Aquino and Carla Lizardo / Description: Inside Look on the Player's Inner Sides)
- Pinoy Wrestling Revolution
- SELfie! (Host: Sel Guevara / Description: Sports on Social Media)
- Sports5 Pre Game Show (aired before the PBA games)
- The Perfect Round (Hosts: Dominic Uy and Cookie La'O / Description: Golf News)
- They Call Me Coach (Host: Chot Reyes / Description: Basic Techniques on Coaching and interviews with renowned coaches from different sports)

=== GG Network ===
- GG Stream Team
