= Digital terrestrial television in the Philippines =

Digital television broadcasting system in the Philippines

Digital terrestrial television (DTT) in the Philippines is the digital broadcasting system used for free-to-air terrestrial television in the country. The National Telecommunications Commission (NTC) adopted ISDB-T as the sole standard for Philippine DTT services in 2010 and retained the standard after a further review in 2013. ISDB-T allows television, audio and data services to be carried through a single transmission facility and supports fixed, mobile and handheld reception. The Philippine standard also incorporates the Emergency Warning Broadcast System (EWBS).

After several years of test transmissions, the large-scale commercial consumer rollout of DTT began on February 11, 2015, when ABS-CBN Corporation launched TVplus. Analog and digital television services subsequently operated alongside each other during the transition.

The first government-mandated phase of the analog switch-off covers Mega Manila and was scheduled as early as 2013; however, it was repeatedly rescheduled. Memorandum Circular No. 005-11-2025 mandates a switch-off period starting November 22, 2025, and ending twelve months later.

On November 18, 2026, the switch-off phase for Mega Manila was extended to January 15, 2027.

In July 2026, the Department of Information and Communications Technology (DICT) presented an indicative roadmap providing for an initial analog switch-off phase, assessment and optimization in 2027, regional expansion in 2028 and 2029, and the development of a nationwide digital broadcasting ecosystem from 2030 onwards. The roadmap did not establish a single mandatory nationwide analog switch-off date.

== History ==
Digital terrestrial television standards by country. The Philippines uses ISDB-T.

=== Early testing and selection of a standard ===
During the 2000s, the NTC allowed broadcasters and telecommunications companies to test different digital television systems while it developed rules for commercial service. Companies were permitted to conduct test transmissions but could not charge viewers while the regulations remained unfinished. One noteworthy issuance is that of a document entitled "Explanatory memorandum and draft memorandum circular for digital terrestrial television (DTT) broadcast service", dated November 3, 2006.

On June 11, 2010, the NTC issued Memorandum Circular No. 02-06-2010, formally selecting ISDB-T as the sole standard for DTT services in the Philippines. The commission cited the standard's ability to carry television, audio and data services to fixed, mobile and handheld receivers through a single transmission facility.

The NTC later reopened its technical review following the emergence of newer digital television systems, including DVB-T2. After evaluating the available systems and the cost of digital receivers, the commission issued Memorandum Circular No. 05-11-2013 on November 4, 2013. The circular retained ISDB-T as the country's sole DTT standard and incorporated the Emergency Warning Broadcast System.

=== Regulatory framework ===
On December 16, 2014, the NTC issued Memorandum Circular No. 07-12-2014, which established the rules for DTT broadcasting and the transition from analog television. The rules allowed authorized DTT services to begin and required VHF television operators receiving digital authority to simulcast their programming in analog and digital form. They also ended the acceptance of applications for new analog television stations.

Each authorized DTT service was required to carry at least one unencrypted free-to-air program. The broadcaster's existing analog program was to be carried as its primary digital program during the migration period.

The 2014 rules did not establish a fixed nationwide analog switch-off date. Analog VHF services were required to remain on the air until further orders from the NTC, while the final shutdown date was to be included in a separate government migration plan.

The rules initially allocated the 512–698 MHz band, corresponding to UHF Channels 21 to 51, for DTT broadcasting. On June 27, 2016, the NTC also reallocated the 470–512 MHz band, corresponding to Channels 14 to 20, for DTT use.

Implementing rules issued on February 22, 2018, established the procedure for assigning Channels 14 to 20. Operating and duly authorized VHF television networks in Mega Manila were given priority in the assignment process, followed by eligible UHF operators and other applicants if channels remained available.

=== Migration plan ===
The DICT published its framework for the DTTB Migration Plan in October 2017. The framework recommended a phased regional switch-off, continued simulcasting during the transition and periodic assessment of digital coverage and receiver uptake.

The framework identified sufficient DTTB service coverage and widespread receiver adoption as the principal conditions for an analog switch-off. It proposed 95-percent digital receiver penetration in each service area as a threshold for migration, although the government retained authority to assess, accelerate or extend the transition.

The plan originally identified December 31, 2023, as the target for the analog switch-off. That target passed without a nationwide shutdown and was later replaced by a phased approach beginning with Mega Manila.

=== Commercial rollout ===
Broadcasters continued conducting digital test transmissions while the regulatory framework was being completed. On February 11, 2015, ABS-CBN officially launched TVplus after seven years of infrastructure development and test broadcasts. It was the first Philippine television network to offer a commercial DTT receiver product to consumers.

== Technology and services ==
A Philippine DTT signal uses a 6 MHz television channel. Digital compression allows a broadcaster to carry multiple standard-definition program, a high-definition program or a combination of television, audio and data services within the channel.

The ISDB-T system supports:

- fixed reception through television sets and set-top boxes;
- mobile and handheld reception through the 1seg service;
- electronic program guides and data broadcasting;
- high-definition and multiple standard-definition program services; and
- emergency information through EWBS.

EWBS is incorporated into the Philippine ISDB-T standard and is intended to deliver visual and audible warnings through compatible receivers. Implementation requires coordination among government agencies, broadcasters and receiver manufacturers.

== Implementation ==
With the transition to digital broadcasting and the eventual shutdown of the analog transmission, television signals will only be able to be received through newer television sets that have the built-in capability to receive ISDB-T digital signals, or through older analog television sets paired with a set-top box. Additionally, and unlike countries such as Australia with its Freeview, the Philippines does not have consistent branding on DTT platforms. As a result, various media companies have introduced their own related commercial products to support the change, as well as to tap into new market opportunities.

Media companies such as ABS-CBN, GMA Network, and TV5 have released their own brands of set-top boxes.

=== Set-top boxes ===
While any compatible ISDB-T televisions or set-top box can receive unencrypted free-to-air digital broadcast available in its coverage area (for example, Baron's digital receiver box), various networks have rolled out set-top boxes that carry their own brandings. ABS-CBN was the first company to commercially launch DTT, when they launched TV Plus on 11 February 2015. ABS-CBN also operated exclusive DTT channels (i.e. channels that other set-top box devices cannot receive) through an exclusive version of the Conditional Access System used by pay TV operators. Other branded set-top boxes include the now defunct Easy TV of Solar Entertainment, launched in May 2018; the Affordabox of GMA Network, launched in June 2020, which also offers an encrypted recording feature but only for the network's existing subchannels; and the Sulit TV of TV5 Network, launched in September 2021.

Some set-top box brands had a limited launch in various regions, including the Tipidbox of Philippine Collective Media Corporation in partnership with RCA in Tacloban, launched in 2021; and the DigiTV of Brigada News TV in General Santos and its surrounding areas, launched in February 2024.

The government, through the Presidential Communications Office (PCO), also has its own brand of set-top box called the Bagong Pilipinas Digibox for distribution to low-income families to help them transition to digital television. It was launched in January 2024, later than the launch of most of the commercial products.

=== Mobile phones and dongles ===
Smartphones and tablet computers with built-in digital TV tuners were introduced to the market during the 2010s, including brands such as Starmobile, Cherry Mobile, MyPhone, Alcatel, Samsung, O+, and SKK Mobile. Dongles capable of receiving digital signals like ABS-CBN's TV Plus Go and GMA's Now were also introduced for compatible devices through USB On-The-Go and USB-C in later models.

== Household adoption and readiness ==
A household penetration study commissioned by the DICT classified approximately 80 percent of television households in its Mega Manila study area as digital-TV-ready. The total consisted of 69 percent receiving free-to-air digital terrestrial television and 11 percent using pay television. The remaining 20 percent continued to rely on analog television.

The term digital-TV-ready in the study therefore included both free-to-air DTT households and households using pay-television services; it was not equivalent to the percentage using terrestrial ISDB-T reception alone.

At the Philippine Digital TV Summit 2026, the DICT presented preliminary results from a second phase of household studies conducted in 2025. It classified 78.81 percent of households in Central Luzon, 65 percent in Metro Cebu and 72.09 percent in Metro Davao as digital-TV-ready. These figures were presented as readiness estimates rather than analog switch-off dates for the respective areas.

== Analog switch-off ==
=== Earlier timetable ===
The 2006 NTC draft and exploratory memorandum intended for a December 31, 2015 switch-off date (over 9 years later). Early 2010 news articles hint that a timely release of Implementing Rules and Regulations (IRR) by the government could have allowed a 2013 date instead.

However, by 2014, the commission's DTT rules no longer provided for a fixed nationwide analog switch-off date. Analog VHF television services were required to continue until further orders from the commission, and the date was to be set in a separate government migration plan.

The DICT's 2017 migration framework identified December 31, 2023, as the initial national target. It recommended a phased approach and required periodic assessment of digital coverage and receiver adoption. The 2023 target passed without a nationwide analog shutdown.

=== Mega Manila phase ===
Public Service Announcement on the 22 November 2026 Mega Manila Analog Television Switch-Off

In November 2025, the NTC issued Memorandum Circular No. 005-11-2025, establishing Mega Manila as the first mandatory analog switch-off phase.

The circular took effect on November 22, 2025. It provided that:

- The analog switch-off process would commence upon effectivity;
- Affected stations would complete their switch-offs within twelve months, unless the period was extended by the NTC;
- Television networks and stations would carry public-service announcements for at least sixty days before their intended switch-off dates; and
- Analog television frequencies and analog simulcast assignments would be recalled after the switch-off.

The period was originally scheduled to end on the same date next year. However, on November 18, 2026, the NTC announced an extension to January 15, 2027. The date is therefore the intended deadline for completion of the Mega Manila phase, rather than necessarily a single simultaneous shutdown time for all stations.

=== Nationwide transition roadmap ===
At the Philippine Digital TV Summit 2026, the DICT presented the following indicative transition roadmap:

Period	Phase	Description
January 15, 2027	Initial analog switch-off implementation	Implementation of the first phased analog-to-digital transition, beginning with Mega Manila
2027	Assessment and optimisation	Evaluation of the first phase and refinement of strategies for succeeding areas
2028–2029	Regional expansion	Progressive expansion of the transition to other regions
2030 onwards	Nationwide digital ecosystem	Development of a fully digital broadcasting environment and expanded digital services

The roadmap described the direction of the phased transition but did not set a legally binding, single nationwide analog switch-off date.

=== Timeline ===
Date	Area	Event or status	Reference
December 31, 2023	Nationwide	Original target under the 2017 migration framework; not achieved	
November 22, 2025	Mega Manila	Twelve-month analog switch-off period began	
November 22, 2026	Mega Manila	Original completion deadline	
January 15, 2027	Mega Manila	Revised completion deadline	
2027	Areas following the first phase	Assessment and optimization under the indicative DICT roadmap	
2028–2029	Regional	Indicative regional expansion	
2030 onwards	Nationwide	Target horizon for a nationwide digital broadcasting ecosystem; not a fixed nationwide analog switch-off date	

=== Broadcasters that have ended analog transmission ===
While the nationwide analog switch-off has been repeatedly delayed, ten broadcasters independently ended their analog transmissions and transitioned fully to digital broadcasting.

- Light Network (now Light TV), which primarily serves Mega Manila, became the first channel in the Philippines to fully switch to digital broadcasting when it completely shut down its analog broadcasts on February 28, 2017.
- Independent channel RJTV, which serves Metro Manila and its surrounding provinces, switched off its analog broadcast on June 5, 2018.
- GBN ended its analog broadcasts on December 1, 2018.
- DBS ended its analog broadcast in 2019 and switched to a digital online streaming via their own website and YouTube. There are no known plans for digital terrestrial television.
- SBN fully switched to digital after shutting down its analog broadcast on September 12, 2019.
- BEAM TV fully switched to digital after shutting down its analog broadcast on New Year’s Eve, December 31, 2021.
- SMNI fully switched to digital after shutting down its analog broadcast on January 5, 2023.
- CLTV-36 fully switched to digital after shutting down its analog broadcast on December 6, 2023 it became the first regional independent channel to pull the plug its analog broadcast.
- UNTV switched off their analog broadcasting on New Year’s Day, January 1, 2025.
- CCTN-47 fully switched to digital after shutting down its analog broadcast on August 1, 2026 it became the second regional independent channel to pull the plug its analog broadcast.

== Individual broadcaster actions ==
=== National broadcasters ===
- ABS-CBN/AMCARA: ABS-CBN Corporation and AMCARA Broadcasting Network intended to spend 1 billion pesos on its transition to digital broadcasting. ABS-CBN announced on 4 April 2011 that it was prepared to launch five free "premium" channels on a DTT platform as soon as the NTC finalized its regulations on digital television. ABS-CBN's flagship used UHF Channel 43 (647.143 MHz) for its ISDB-Tb transmission test, after previously using Channel 51 (695.143 MHz) for test broadcasts using DVB-T. The initial test was conducted in areas of Valenzuela, Bulacan, Rizal, Cavite, and Laguna. In November 2010, ABS-CBN began rolling out its digital broadcast in 17 cities in Metropolitan Manila as well as selected areas in Bulacan and Pampanga. The company was also planning to move its SFN frequency to UHF Channel 14 to be the first service to scan on DTT receivers. However, the network was forced off the air in 2020. Channel 14 was eventually used instead by state-run People's Television Network, Inc. On 25 January 2022, the NTC awarded the frequencies that were used by ABS-CBN before it shut to Villar-owned Advanced Media Broadcasting System (AMBS) for Channel 16, Aliw Broadcasting Corporation for Channel 23, and Sonshine Media Network International for Channel 43.
- AMBS/All TV: On 26 June 2022, Advanced Media Broadcasting System started conducting DTT testing using ISDB-Tb on UHF Channel 16 (485.143 MHz).
- PTV: In 2009, the state broadcaster People's Television Network, Inc. began DTT trials using ISDB-Tb on Channel 48 (677.143 MHz). In 2011, the Japanese government donated additional equipment to the network to improve its digital services. PTV4 is also planning to operate an Emergency Warning Broadcast System (EWBS) using the digital platform. PTV later used Channel 42 (641.143 MHz) frequency, which has since been moved to channel 14 (473.143 MHz).
- TV5/NBC: TV5 Network, Inc. (formerly known as ABC Development Corporation/Associated Broadcasting Company) and Nation Broadcasting Corporation have been using ISDB-Tb for their DTT trials via a simulcast of flagship DWET-TV through DWDZ-TV (now defunct). TV5 was broadcast on two DTT channels as part of their test broadcast: Channel 42 (641.143 MHz) from Nation Broadcasting Corporation and Channel 51 (695.143 MHz) from the GV Broadcasting System. Currently, programs from TV5 and its sister channels One Sports and RPTV are primarily broadcast on the NTC-assigned and SFN-based Channel 18 (497.143 MHz), while remaining in simulcast on the other two existing frequencies.
- GMA/CNMPI: GMA Network, Inc. and Citynet Network Marketing and Productions applied for a digital television license from the NTC to install and maintain transmitting stations that will be attuned with and utilized to offer digital terrestrial television and digital mobile TV broadcast services, using UHF Channel 27. Areas planned for a temporary digital broadcast covered the cities of Quezon City, Makati, Pasig, Tagaytay, and Angeles City in Pampanga, as well as Ortigas, Cavite, and Calumpit in Bulacan. GMA was vocal about the NTC's choice of the country's DTV standard. On 27 March 2011, a GMA executive proposed the use of the updated European standard DVB-T2 as opposed to ISDB-Tb, due to its better quality. However, the NTC did not change its decision to use ISDB-Tb, with which the company complied a few years later. Currently, GMA's domestic channels are broadcasting via DTT on UHF Channel 15 (479.143 MHz), with the network starting to broadcast in widescreen on 27 February 2023.

=== Religious and independent broadcasters ===
- Net 25 and INC TV: In 2007, two religious broadcast companies owned by the Iglesia ni Cristo, Eagle Broadcasting Corporation and Christian Era Broadcasting Service International launched the first digital television station in the country, DZCE-TV channel 49 (683.143 MHz), then under the GEMNET brand. Initially broadcasting in DVB-T, it shifted to using ISDB-Tb in 2009. However, following the launch of INCTV, digital transmissions were initially conducted during analog off-air periods from 12:00 a.m.– 4:00 a.m. By 5 September 2017, the network was given a "special authority" by the NTC to transfer its analog broadcasts to UHF Channel 48 to allow Channel 49 to conduct its full-time digital simulcast. The stations use the frequencies UHF Channel 28 (557.143 MHz) and UHF Channel 49 (683.143 MHz).
- SMNI: Sonshine Media Network International conducted DTT test broadcasts using ISDB-T on UHF Channel 40 (629.143 MHz). The station used the frequencies UHF Channel 39 (623.143 MHz), UHF Channel 43 (647.143 MHz), and UHF Channel 44 (653.143 MHz) until 21 December 2023, when the NTC suspended the network's operations for 30 days due to alleged violations of its broadcast franchise. On 18 January 2024, the NTC issued a cease-and-desist order against SMNI for violating its 30-day suspension order as its two stations in Region VI were operational as of 27 December 2023.
- Hope Channel Philippines/GBN and GNN/IBMI: Gateway UHF Television Broadcasting, Interactive Broadcast Media and First United Broadcasting Corporation conducted DTT testing using ISDB-Tb on UHF Channel 45 (659.143 MHz).
- UNTV: Progressive Broadcasting Corporation, owned and operated by Breakthrough and Milestones Productions International, tested its ISDB-Tb on UHF Channel 38 (617.143 MHz), and can be viewed in Mega Manila, Bulacan, Pampanga, Tarlac, Cavite, and other nearby provinces. UNTV fully abandoned its analog transmissions and shifted to digital television on 1 January 2025.
- RJTV: On 4 January 2019, Rajah Broadcasting Network started broadcasting on digital using UHF Channel 29 (563.143 MHz). RJTV was the second TV network in the country to fully abandon its analog transmissions and shift to digital television.

=== Commercial and regional broadcasters ===
- BEAM TV: Broadcast Enterprises and Affiliated Media, Inc., owned by a joint consortium led by Bethlehem Holdings, Inc., an investee of Globe Telecom Retirement Fund through its holding company HALO Holdings Inc. (which owns 39 percent of Altimax Broadcasting Company), applied for digital terrestrial broadcast but was still vocal with regard to the DVB-T2 digital system. The station uses the frequency UHF Channel 31 (575.143 MHz).
- SEC/SBN/BCI: Solar Entertainment Corporation tested its DTT using ISDB-T on UHF Channel 21 (515.143 MHz) after Channel 22 (521.143 MHz) and UHF Channel 30 (569.143 MHz), but the second frequency eventually moved to UHF Channel 22 (521.143 MHz), replacing the main/first one possibly operated by subsidiary SBN. Solar also operates free-to-air and exclusive DTT channels. In the first quarter of 2018, Solar launched its digital set-top box called Easy TV, until it ceased on 30 September 2019.
- RPN/Nine Media/RPTV: On 28 January 2016, the state-sequestered Radio Philippines Network and Private company Nine Media Corporation conducted a DTT test using ISDB-Tb on UHF Channel 19 (503.143 MHz).
- Light TV/ZOE TV: On 1 March 2017, ZOE Broadcasting Network made history in Philippine TV broadcasting when it switched to digital-only broadcasting, using DZOZ-DTV Channel 33 (587.143 MHz). Light Network was the first TV network in the country to fully abandon its analog transmissions and shift to digital television, with network engineers stating that they had been prepared to make the switch happen for years. The second frequency eventually used DZOE-DTV Channel 20 (509.143 MHz).
- IBC: In October 2017, despite its impending privatization, the state-sequestered Intercontinental Broadcasting Corporation managed to conduct DTT testing using ISDB-T on UHF Channel 26 (545.143 MHz). On 18 March 2022 the station moved to UHF Channel 17 (491.143 MHz), returning to the old frequency temporarily from 21 March to 31 March 2022.
- MBC/DZRH TV: Manila Broadcasting Company, the largest radio network in the Philippines, started conducting its DTT broadcast in Cebu and Iloilo City using UHF Channel 43 (647.143 MHz) and Bacolod City using UHF Channel 39 (623.143 MHz).
- PRTV: In 2021, Philippine Collective Media Corporation started conducting DTT testing in Tacloban using ISDB-Tb on UHF Channel 50 (689.143 MHz). The latter launched its own digital set-top box for the said area, marketed as "PRTV Tipidbox" partnered with RCA.
- Aliw BC/Aliw Channel 23: On 6 May 2022, Aliw Broadcasting Corporation started DTT testing using ISDB-Tb on UHF Channel 23 (527.143 MHz).
- CLTV36: On 10 September 2023, Central Luzon Television, owned by Radioworld Broadcasting Corporation, started conducting DTT testing using ISDB-Tb on UHF Channel 36 (605.143 MHz). The station held a test broadcast on 16 October 2023 and was officially launched on 7 December 2023.
- Brigada TV: Brigada Mass Media Corporation started conducting DTT testing in General Santos using ISDB-Tb on UHF Channel 37 (611.143 MHz). In February 2024, it launched its own digital set-top box called Brigada DigiTV which is currently available in General Santos and surrounding areas.
- CCTN47: On 1 August 2026, Cebu Catholic Television Network started conducting DTT testing in Cebu using ISDB-Tb on UHF Channel 47 (671.143 MHz).

== See also ==
- Digital television transition
- Television in the Philippines
- List of digital television stations in the Philippines
