= ABS-CBN Convergence =

Telecommunications company in the Philippines

ABS-CBN Convergence, Inc.
- Type: Subsidiary
- Industry: Telecommunications
- Founded: December 29, 2011
- Headquarters: ABS-CBN Broadcasting Center, Sgt. Esguerra Ave. corner Mother Ignacia St., Brgy. South Triangle, Diliman, Quezon City, Philippines
- Key people: Carlo Katigbak (President and CEO)
- Products: ABS-CBN Mobile; ABS-CBN TV Plus
- Services: Mobile telephony, Digital terrestrial television
- Owner: ABS-CBN Corporation (68%); Globe Telecom (32%)
- Parent: ABS-CBN

ABS-CBN Convergence, Inc. (formerly known as Multimedia Telephony, Inc.) is the communications subsidiary of the Philippine media conglomerate ABS-CBN Corporation. It operates a wireless mobile phone service ABS-CBN Mobile, which was launched on November 16, 2013, and digital terrestrial television service ABS-CBN TV Plus, launched on February 11, 2015.

== History ==
On January 27, 2012, Bayan Telecommunications (BayanTel) signed an asset purchase agreement with ABS-CBN to hand over BayanTel's wireless landline service and its related assets to the latter, which was completed on February 1. The handover includes the telco company's required licenses, interconnection trunks, subscribers and employees. This agreement is executed after BayanTel's acquisition by Globe Telecom through the acquisition of 96.17% of the company's debt. The company later informed the National Telecommunications Commission that they will terminate this service on March 10, 2014 for reasons of costly maintenance. The subscribers of ABS-C's wireless landline service was migrated to ABS-CBN Mobile after the service shut down.

On May 28, 2013, ABS-CBN signed a network-sharing agreement with Globe to create a new mobile telephony brand, ABS-CBN Mobile, expected to begin by the end of 2013. ABS-CBN Mobile will create its own prepaid and postpaid voice, SMS, and mobile broadband services while sharing servers, towers, and switches with Globe. Parent ABS-CBN Corporation will inject ₱2–3 billion to subsidiary ABS-CBN to build and expand the telco service for the next two years.

The National Telecommunications Commission approved the deal on June 8, 2013. The mobile service was supposed to launch in early September but it was postponed due to operational issues. ABS-CBN Mobile was instead launched on November 16, 2013, for the benefit of the survivors of Super Typhoon Yolanda (Haiyan).

With the National Telecommunications Commission issuing the implementing rules and regulations for the country's shift to digital television on December 18, 2014, ABS-CBN Corporation officially launches ABS-CBN TVplus on February 11, 2015 by a ceremonial switch-on at the ABS-CBN Broadcasting Center. It is a set-top box that uses the ISDB-T International standard to detect digital terrestrial (free TV) signals with five specialty digital television channels.
