= ABS-CBN TV Plus =

Philippine digital television service

ABS-CBN TVplus
- Product type: DTT Set-top box; DTT Mobile TV Dongle
- Current owner: ABS-CBN Corporation (2011–present); Adtel, Inc. (2021–present)
- Produced by: Atlanta DTH, Inc.
- Country: Philippines
- Introduced: As ABS-CBN TV Plus: 2011 (free trial); February 15, 2015 (commercial release); As ABS-CBN TV Plus Digital TV Receiver: September 2021
- Discontinued: As ABS-CBN TV Plus: June 30, 2020 (broadcast franchise lapsed/expired)
- Markets: Philippines
- Ambassadors: For ABS-CBN TVplus: Sarah Geronimo; Coco Martin; For ABS-CBN TVplus Go: Anne Curtis
- Website: Archived official website at the Wayback Machine (archived 2020-07-22)

ABS-CBN TV Plus (formerly Sky TV+ and stylized as ABS-CBN TVplus, repackaged in 2021 as ABS-CBN TVplus Digital TV Receiver) is a Philippine ISDB-T encrypted digital terrestrial television provider owned and operated by ABS-CBN Convergence, a subsidiary of ABS-CBN Corporation. The service distributes digital set-top boxes with freemium and free-to-view digital TV channels, Broadcast Markup Language, Emergency Warning Broadcast System, and pay per view services to selected areas in the Philippines. In order to avail the service, users must buy an ABS-CBN TVplus set-top box and activate it through ABS-CBNmobile SIM card; activation requirements for the digital channels through other mobile networks later became available around the second quarter of 2018.

As of 2021, the sales and marketing of ABS-CBN TVplus has been transferred to its sister company Adtel, Inc. which also distributes Baron digital TV receivers.

== History ==
ABS-CBN Corporation initially applied for a license from the National Telecommunications Commission (NTC) to operate a digital terrestrial television service in the country back in 2007. ABS-CBN planned to utilize multiplex to offer ABS-CBN, Studio 23 (later S+A from 2014 to 2020), and 5 additional specialty TV channels. The conglomerate is expecting to spend around ₱1 billion annually for the next five years for their DTT transition. ABS-CBN utilized UHF channel 51 Manila (695.143 MHz), later UHF Channel 43 (647.143 MHz), for test broadcasts in the DVB-T format. ABS-CBN was expected to begin digital test broadcasts in January 2009.

In 2010, the NTC announced that it would formally adopt the Japanese standard ISDB-T for digital broadcasting and issued a circular ordering the entire country's television networks to switch off their analog services on December 31, 2015, at 11:59 p.m., Philippine Standard Time (UTC+8). Due to the continuous delay in the release of the implementing rules and regulations for digital television broadcasts, the target date was moved to 2023.

In April 2011, ABS-CBN announced further details about its DTT plans, which will offer ABS-CBN and Studio 23 (now S+A). Five new channels will be exclusively available to its digital users and will be offered once the digital broadcast starts. The specialty TV channel line-up includes one news channel, two youth-oriented channels, an educational channel, and a movie channel. ABS-CBN is also planning to utilize the 1seg (one segment) broadcast standard for handheld devices.

The set-top box, then known as TV+, was previewed on ABS-CBN's morning show Umagang Kay Ganda on March 22, 2012, where they offered free samples to their studio audiences. Since then, until its official launch, TV+ has been distributed as a prize for the quiz segments of DZMM's "Failon Ngayon sa DZMM" and "Ang Mahiwagang Blackbox" (The Magical Blackbox).

On December 18, 2014, the NTC issued the implementing rules and regulations for digital terrestrial television broadcast in the country. ABS-CBN Corporation officially launched ABS-CBN TVplus on February 11, 2015, through a ceremonial switch-on at the ABS-CBN Broadcasting Center.

In July 2015, the Metropolitan Manila Development Authority (MMDA) signed a memorandum of agreement with ABS-CBN for the inclusion of the Emergency Warning Broadcast System (EWBS) in ABS-CBN TVplus. The feature was activated during the Metro Manila Wide Shake Drill held on July 30 through an over-the-air update.

In March 2016, in celebration of its first anniversary, a redesigned version of the set-top box was released, with a new processor and support for HDMI and HDTV resolutions; the latter feature was later removed when the price of TVplus was reduced in the fourth quarter of 2016.

In May 2016, TVplus was awarded two bronze Stevies for "Best in New Product Innovation" and "Best in Branded Development" in the 2016 Asia Pacific Stevie Awards.

TVplus updated ABS-CBN's main channel by putting their regional network feed in provinces that have their own audiences.

On July 30, 2018, ABS-CBN TVplus conducted a free trial of the new set of freemium channels using UHF Channel 16 (485.143 MHz). It includes cable channels from sister company Creative Programs: O Shopping (also aired as overnight programming for ABS-CBN), Jeepney TV, and Myx (which previously had a complimentary channel called Myx2 before TVplus launched in 2015). Also included in the lineup are two new exclusive digital channels, Asianovela Channel and Movie Central. Initially, the five new channels will be broadcast from Metro Manila, Metro Cebu and Cagayan de Oro, with plans to extend their coverage to existing ABS-CBN DTV stations.

On November 10, 2018, ABS-CBN TVplus launched its digital service in Batangas, making it its 16th signal coverage area.

On June 1, 2019, ABS-CBN launched a digital TV dongle called ABS-CBN TVplus Go for Android smartphones. It was initially available in Metro Manila, Cavite, Laguna, Rizal, Bulacan, Pampanga, Benguet, Tarlac, Pangasinan, Nueva Ecija, Batangas, Iloilo, Bacolod, Metro Cebu, Cagayan de Oro, and Metro Davao.

As of February 2020, ABS-CBN TVplus had sold over 9 million units of its set-top boxes.

On May 5, 2020, ABS-CBN TVplus was affected by the cease-and-desist order (CDO) issued by the National Telecommunications Commission (NTC) and Solicitor General Jose Calida due to ABS-CBN's franchise expiry (inability to renew the franchise before its expiration date). ABS-CBN's main channel and S+A ceased broadcasting, as well as the regional digital stations operated by ABS-CBN. Some TVplus channels resumed broadcasting on May 8, but with limited coverage (Metro Manila, Laguna province, Iloilo province, and selected areas of Baguio) through a blocktime agreement with an unnamed third-party broadcast company. On June 1, 2020, Jeepney TV and Asianovela Channel resumed broadcasting and took over the channel spaces of ABS-CBN and S+A, respectively.

On June 30, 2020, all the digital channels of ABS-CBN TVplus were forced to stop operations due to the alias cease-and-desist order issued by the National Telecommunications Commission. Yey! and Asianovela Channel stopped broadcasting, while Cine Mo!, TeleRadyo (now reverted to DZMM TeleRadyo), and Jeepney TV are still available on Sky Cable and other cable providers. However, digital broadcasts of other broadcast television networks remained on-air on TVplus.

During the same Congressional hearing, ABS-CBN Corporation confirmed that they had stopped selling TVplus boxes in February 2020 after their subsidiary and its parent, ABS-CBN Convergence failed to secure a separate legislative franchise during that same month.

=== Recent developments ===
In September 2021, the unsold units were renamed ABS-CBN TVplus Digital TV Receiver. These units are now promoted as a regular digital TV set-top box in the sense that they also receive free-to-air digital channels. The sales and marketing of the digital TV receiver has since been transferred to ABS-CBN's sister company Adtel, Inc., which mainly manufactures Baron Digital TV receivers, and traces of ABS-CBN's free-to-air digital channels and cable channels are eliminated.

== Offered services ==
=== ABS-CBN TVplus ===
An original and flagship product, it is a digital television converter box that can be used on both house and vehicle use.

=== ABS-CBN TVplus Internet ===
This variation of ABS-CBN TVplus includes an internet dongle stick that connects the TV to the internet via the prepaid plans of its selected provider, ABS-CBNmobile. It was available in selected areas only, until was discontinued after the closure of ABS-CBNmobile in 2018.

=== ABS-CBN TVplus Go ===
Logo of ABS-CBN TVplus Go

An encrypted dongle stick that allows Android smartphones to watch the digital channels that ABS-CBN TVplus can receive and is mainly meant for outdoor use.

== Channel line-up ==
=== UHF Channel 43 (647.143 MHz) ^{1} ===
Channel	Video	Aspect	PSIP Short Name	Programming	Note
1.01	480i	4:3	JEEPNEY TV^{3} ABS-CBN	Jeepney TV ABS-CBN	Encrypted; Test broadcast^{2} Commercial broadcast
1.02	480i	4:3	ASIANOVELA CHANNEL^{3} SPORTS+ACTION	Asianovela Channel ABS-CBN Sports and Action	Encrypted; Test broadcast^{2} Commercial broadcast
1.03	480i	4:3	CINEMO!	Cine Mo!	Encrypted; Test broadcast^{2} Commercial broadcast
1.04	480i	4:3	YEY!	Yey!	Encrypted; Test broadcast^{2} Commercial broadcast
1.05	480i	4:3	TeleRadyo	TeleRadyo	Commercial test broadcast ^{2}
1.06	480i	4:3	KBO	Kapamilya Box Office	Pay-per-view; Encrypted (available only on TVplus, not available on TVplus Go)

=== UHF Channel 16 (485.143 MHz) ^{1} ===
Channel	Video	Aspect	PSIP Short Name	Programming	Note
2.01	480i	4:3	Knowledge Channel	Knowledge Channel	Commercial broadcast
2.02	480i	16:9	O SHOPPING	O Shopping	Commercial broadcast
2.03	480i	4:3	ASIANOVELA CHANNEL	Asianovela Channel	Encrypted; Test broadcast^{2}
2.04	480i	4:3	MOVIE CENTRAL	Movie Central	Encrypted; Test broadcast^{2}
2.05	480i	4:3	JEEPNEY TV	Jeepney TV	Encrypted; Test broadcast^{2}
2.06	480i	4:3	MYX	Myx	Encrypted; Test broadcast^{2}
2.31	240p	4:3	ASIANOVELA ONESEG	Asianovela Channel	1seg

^{1} For Mega Manila only, channel and frequency vary on regional stations.
^{2} These channels are encrypted and protected using their own encryption system, thus requiring SMS activation to access those channels in a limited time according to the subscription. In addition, all non-encrypted digital terrestrial TV channels broadcast within the area of the household will also be carried.
^{3} On June 1, 2020, Jeepney TV and Asianovela Channel temporarily took over the respective channel spaces of ABS-CBN and S+A after ABS-CBN received a cease-and-desist order on May 5, 2020.

== Channel and frequency ==
Channel 1 of the ABS-CBN TVplus broadcasts the following channels per their respective broadcast areas:

Branding	Callsign	Ch. #	Frequency	Area of Coverage
ABS-CBN Manila	DWWX-TV (Defunct)	43 (Defunct)	647.143 MHz	Metro Manila
ABS-CBN Manila	DWWX-TV (Defunct)	16 (Defunct)	485.143 MHz	Metro Manila
ABS-CBN Baguio	D-3-ZO-TV (Defunct)	30 (Defunct)	569.143 MHz	Baguio
ABS-CBN Bulacan	DWBY-TV (Defunct)	34 (Defunct)	593.143 MHz	San Miguel, Bulacan
ABS-CBN Pampanga	DWIN-TV (Defunct)	34 (Defunct)	593.143 MHz	San Fernando, Pampanga
ABS-CBN Tarlac	DWTC-TV (Defunct)	34 (Defunct)	593.143 MHz	Tarlac
ABS-CBN Batangas	DZAD-TV (Defunct)	40 (Defunct)	629.143 MHz	Batangas
ABS-CBN San Pablo	DWLY-TV (Defunct)	38 (Defunct)	617.143 MHz	San Pablo, Laguna
ABS-CBN Iloilo	DYAF-TV (Defunct)	25 (Defunct)	539.143 MHz	Iloilo
ABS-CBN Bacolod	DYXL-TV (Defunct)	22 (Defunct)	521.143 MHz	Bacolod
ABS-CBN Cebu	DYCB-TV (Defunct)	37 (Defunct)	611.143 MHz	Cebu
ABS-CBN Cebu	DYCB-TV (Defunct)	36 (Defunct)	605.143 MHz	Cebu
ABS-CBN Cagayan de Oro	DXCS-TV (Defunct)	40 (Defunct)	629.143 MHz	Cagayan de Oro
ABS-CBN Cagayan de Oro	DXCS-TV (Defunct)	22 (Defunct)	521.143 MHz	Cagayan de Oro
ABS-CBN Davao	DXAS-TV (Defunct)	35 (Defunct)	599.143 MHz	Davao

== See also ==
- Digital terrestrial television in the Philippines
- Easy TV (defunct)
- GMA Affordabox
- Sulit TV
