= Alagang Kapatid Foundation =

Division of TV5 Network

Alagang Kapatid Foundation Inc.
- Founded: 2004 (as Operation Tulong Bayan); 2010 (as Alagang Kapatid Foundation)
- Type: Charitable organization
- Purpose: Health, Education, Disaster relief, Values Formation, Emergency Response
- Location: TV5 Media Center, Reliance cor. Sheridan Sts., Mandaluyong
- Region served: Philippines
- Owner: TV5 Network
- Key people: Manuel V. Pangilinan (Chairman)
- Subsidiaries: Rescue5
- Website: Alagang Kapatid Foundation Inc. Official Facebook page Rescue5 Official Facebook page

Alagang Kapatid Foundation, Inc. (formerly known as Operation Tulong Bayan) is the corporate social responsibility organization of TV5 Network Inc. Offices are located at the TV5 Media Center, Reliance cor. Sheridan Sts., Mandaluyong.

== History ==
ABC Development Corporation's (now TV5 Network, Inc.) social responsibility began after the acquisition of the conglomerate to businessman Antonio "Tonyboy" Cojuangco, Jr. in 2004. Cojuangco then organizes its program through the Corporate Affairs department named as Operation Tulong Bayan. However, the project came to a hiatus after the massive layoff of the conglomerate's employees in 2007.

When ABC was acquired in turn by PLDT's MediaQuest Holdings from the joint consortium led by the Cojuangco group and Malaysian media conglomerate Media Prima Berhad, TV5 organizes its socio-profit organizations named as Alagang Kapatid Foundation, named after TV5's health program with a same name. In coordination with its affiliates under the MVP Group of Companies it was able to initiate relief operations and livelihood programs to some impoverished towns in the country.

Alagang Kapatid Foundation kept is synergies with these affiliates in relief operations, especially when TV5 organizes two telethons in the past two years namely: The Tulong Kapatid telethon of December 10, 2012, when they are able to collect P100 million in 6 hours (18:00 - 24:00 PST) to help the victims of Supertyphoon Pablo (Bopha); and a special live episode of now-defunct The Mega and the Songwriter, entitled Gabi ng Kanta At Biyaya aired on November 10, 2013. This time, they have collected P30 million for the victims of Supertyphoon Yolanda (Haiyan).

== Rescue5 ==
Rescue5 is a joint project of Alagang Kapatid Foundation and News5. It is an emergency response unit that has its own mobile units carrying team members trained in disaster and accident situations. It also embarks on community training programs to prepare citizens for emergencies. Through TV5's various platforms. Rescue 5's various initiatives and mandates are further implemented, leveraging the network's ability to educate and spread information to enhance its work and impact on the ground, fulfilling News5's slogan: Higit sa Balita, Impormasyon at Pangyayari, Aksyon! (More than News, Information and Happenings, Action!). Rescue5 has its own hotline and a program on TV5 aired in 2013. Due to its commitment, Rescue5 have given numerous Philippine Quill Awards of excellence and also a rank of reserve unit in the Philippine Air Force.
