= Edgardo Roces =

Filipino businessman and child-sensitivity on television advocate

- Born: Edgardo Carvajal Roces; April 19, 1949
- Died: February 24, 2026 (aged 76)
- Occupations: Business magnate; child-sensitivity on television advocate; activist
- Known for: Former executive and owner of Associated Broadcasting Company (ABC-5)
- Spouse: Julie Sarmiento
- Children: 3
- Parents: Chino Roces (father); Pacita Carvajal (mother)

Edgardo "Eddie" Carvajal Roces (April 19, 1949 – February 24, 2026) was a Filipino businessman. He was credited alongside Edward U. Tan with reviving his father Chino Roces' television station ABC (now TV5) in 1992. He was also a long-time advocate for child-sensitive television programming in the Philippines, having served as president of the Southeast Asian Foundation for Children's Television (SEAFCTV) in the 2000s and as the chairman of Anak TV.

== Career at ABC-5 ==
Roces served as president of the Associated Broadcasting Company (now TV5 Network) from 1992 until 2003, upon which the company was sold to Antonio "Tonyboy" Cojuangco Jr. of PLDT. During his tenure, the revived company attempted to produce its own local shows but eventually resorted to relying on imported programs due to a lack of audience support.

== Activism ==
In August 2009, he formed the Noynoy Aquino for President Movement (NAPM), a nationwide campaign that aimed to convince Sen. Benigno Aquino III to run for president in the 2010 elections via a signature drive. In 2013, he supported senatorial candidate Ricardo Penson's campaign against political dynasties. Roces is also a founding member of the Volkswagen Club of the Philippines (VWCP), which was established in 1985.

== Personal life ==
Edgardo Roces was married to Julie Sarmiento Roces, and had three children.
