= Chino Roces =

Filipino founder of Associated Broadcasting Corporation (1913–1988)

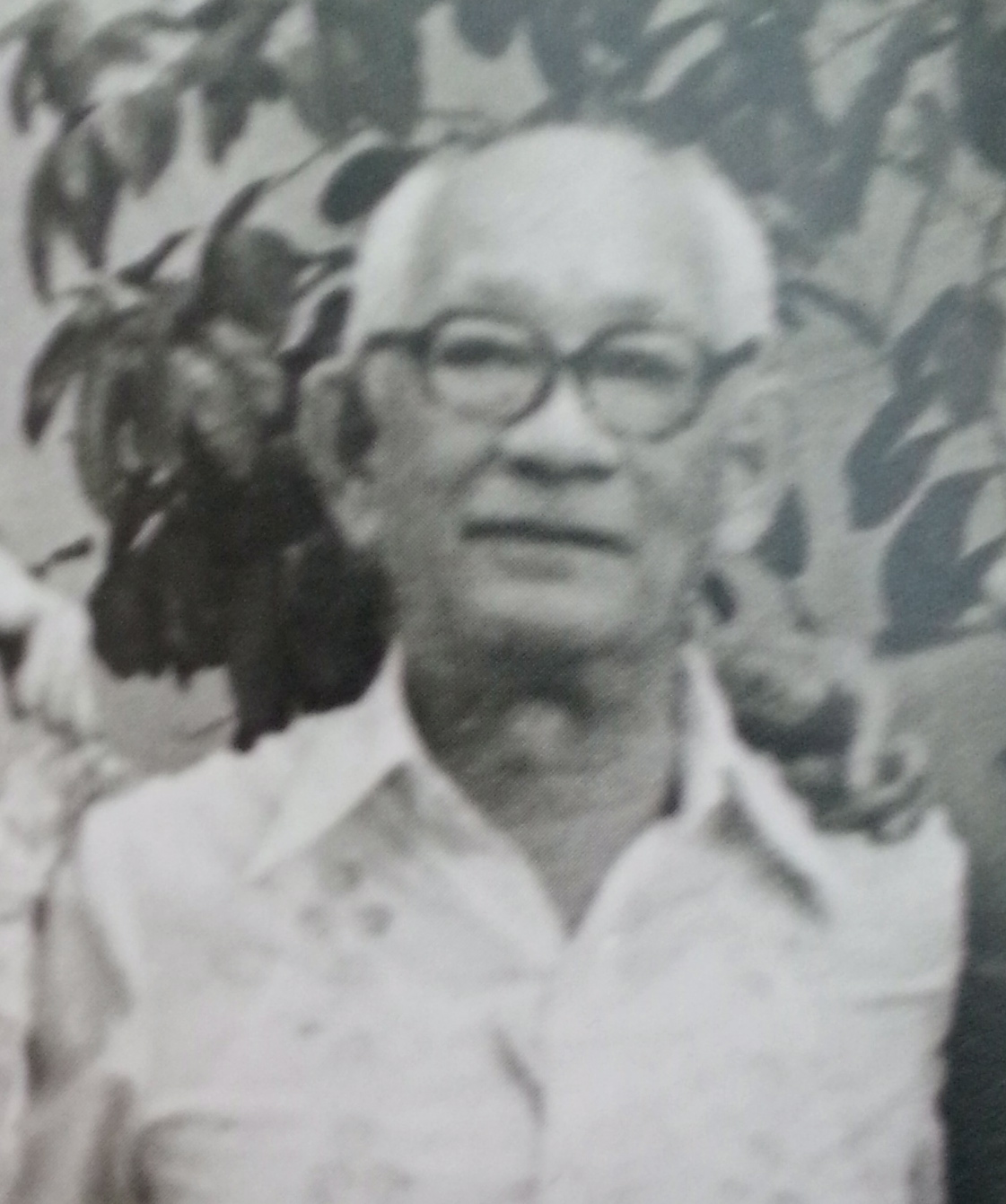
- Born: Joaquin Pardo Roces; June 29, 1913; San Miguel, Manila, Philippine Islands
- Died: September 30, 1988 (aged 75); Manila, Philippines
- Known for: Founder of Associated Broadcasting Corporation; Former owner of The Manila Times
- Spouse: Pacita Carvajal
- Children: 3, including Edgardo

Joaquin "Chino" Pardo Roces (June 29, 1913 – September 30, 1988) was a Filipino businessman and newspaper publisher. He was best known for being the founder of the Associated Broadcasting Corporation (now known as TV5) and a former owner of The Manila Times, as well as his staunch opposition of the administration of Ferdinand Marcos.

== Early life ==
Roces was born on June 29, 1913, to Alejandro "Moy" Roces and Antonia "Nena" Pardo from San Miguel, Manila. He had seven siblings: Ramón Roces, Filomena "Nenita" Roces de Verzosa, Isabel "Bebeng" Roces, Mercedes Roces, Rafael "Tuti" Roces, Antonia "Chucha" Roces de Prieto and Marcos "Taling" Roces.

He studied at the Ateneo de Manila University for high school. He started his journalism career some time after.

== Media career ==
He started his publishing career at his father's newspaper chain TVT (Tribune - La Vanguardia - Taliba) before World War II. Don Chino later headed the Roces family media empire composed of newspapers The Manila Times, Daily Mirror, Sunday Times, Taliba, Women's Magazine Variety, and the Associated Broadcasting Corporation, which first consisted of radio stations DZMT-AM, DZTM-AM, and DZWS-AM and the television station DZTM-TV. He also organized media groups, the Philippine News Agency (PNA), and Philippine Press Institute.

Roces was arrested and jailed when Martial Law was imposed in 1972, together with Benigno "Ninoy" Aquino Jr., José W. "Ka Pepe" Diokno, who is the father of human rights, and Lorenzo M. "Ka Tanny" Tañada Sr. and other journalists. As soon as he was released, he took to the streets to openly protest the Marcos government. After the assassination of Benigno "Ninoy" Aquino Jr. in 1983, he further intensified his protests and during a vigil on Mendiola Bridge, Roces was drenched by water cannons. At the 9th Catholic Mass Media Awards ceremony in April 1985, Roces was presented with the Press Freedom plaque by Cardinal Jaime Sin, upon which the audience was noted to have given a standing ovation to Roces.

In May 1985, Roces was elected to the national council of the newly established Bagong Alyansang Makabayan (Bayan). On September 28, 1985, in the aftermath of the Escalante massacre that involved several victims who were members of Bayan, Roces began a Fund Drive for Escalante. On October 15, 1985, Roces founded the Cory Aquino for President Movement (CAPM) at the National Press Club. He gathered over one million signatures from all over the nation to draft Corazon Aquino to run against Marcos.

After the EDSA revolution in 1986, he returned to publishing, first joining forces with Geny Lopez at the Manila Chronicle, and then later once more the publisher of the family owned The Manila Times.

On July 22, 1988, President Aquino conferred on him the Philippine Legion of Honor Award (degree of chief Commander), the highest honor the country can bestow on a civilian.

== Personal life ==
He was married to Dona Pacita Carvajal and had four children namely: Joaquin "Joaqui" Roces Jr., Arturo Roces, Edgardo "Eddie" C. Roces, and Rocio Rosalinda Antonia Roces.

== Death and legacy ==
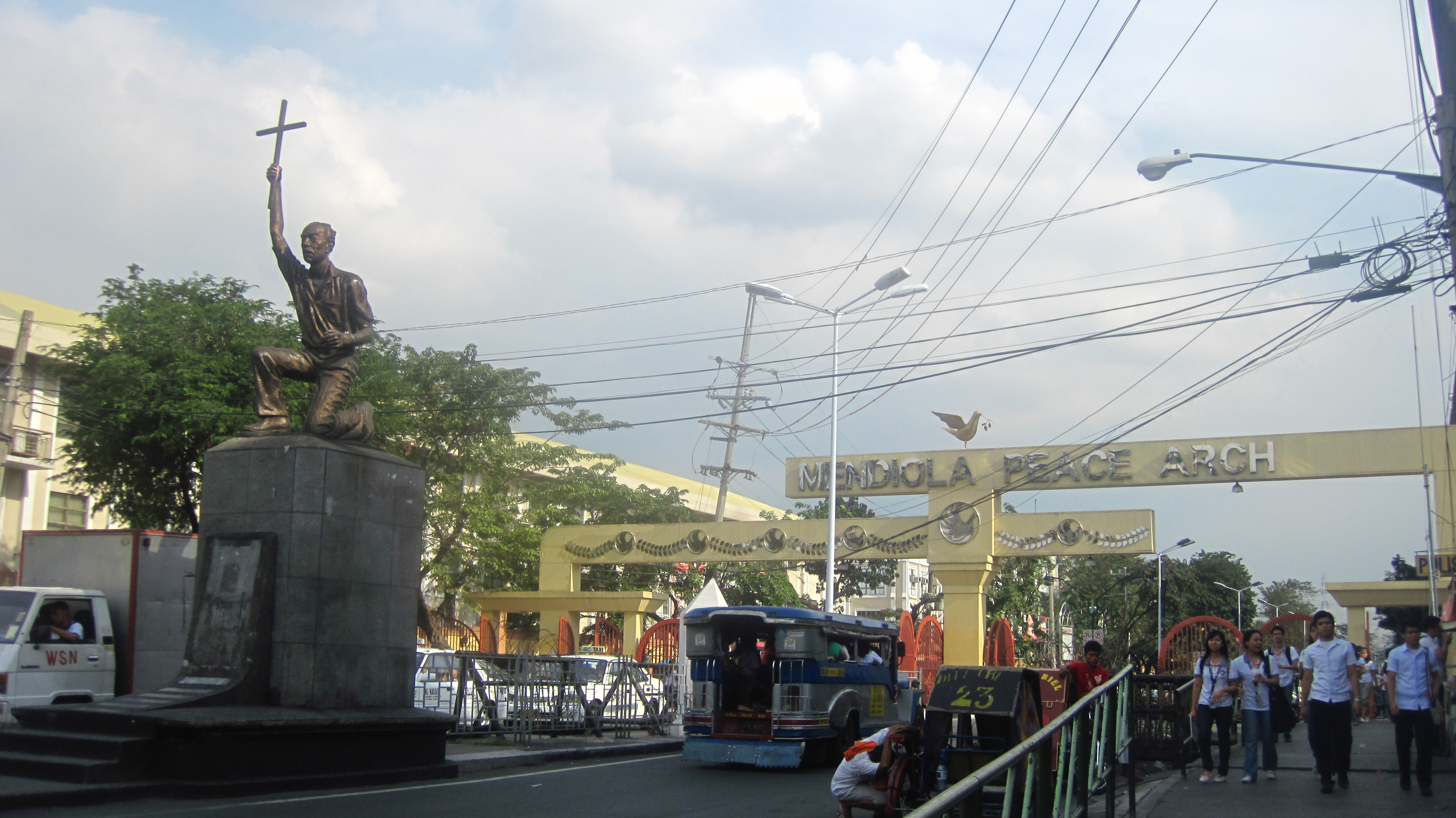
A statue of Roces presently stands at Mendiola Street in Manila.

He died of cancer on September 30, 1988, at the age of 75 in Manila, Philippines.

In that same year, Pasong Tamo Street, one of the main roads in Makati, was renamed Chino Roces Avenue in his honor.

In 1992, Roces was honoured at the Bantayog ng mga Bayani memorial located in Quezon City which honors personalities that helped restored Philippine democracy and their opposition to the martial law regime.

A statue of Roces is presently erected on the north end of Mendiola Street, one of the main thoroughfares of Manila which has renamed as the Don Chino Roces Bridge in honour of the late journalist.

In 2018, the Human Rights Victims' Claims Board (HRVCB) formally recognized Roces and 126 other individuals as a motu proprio victim of human rights violations committed under the Marcos Sr. dictatorship.

== Legacy ==
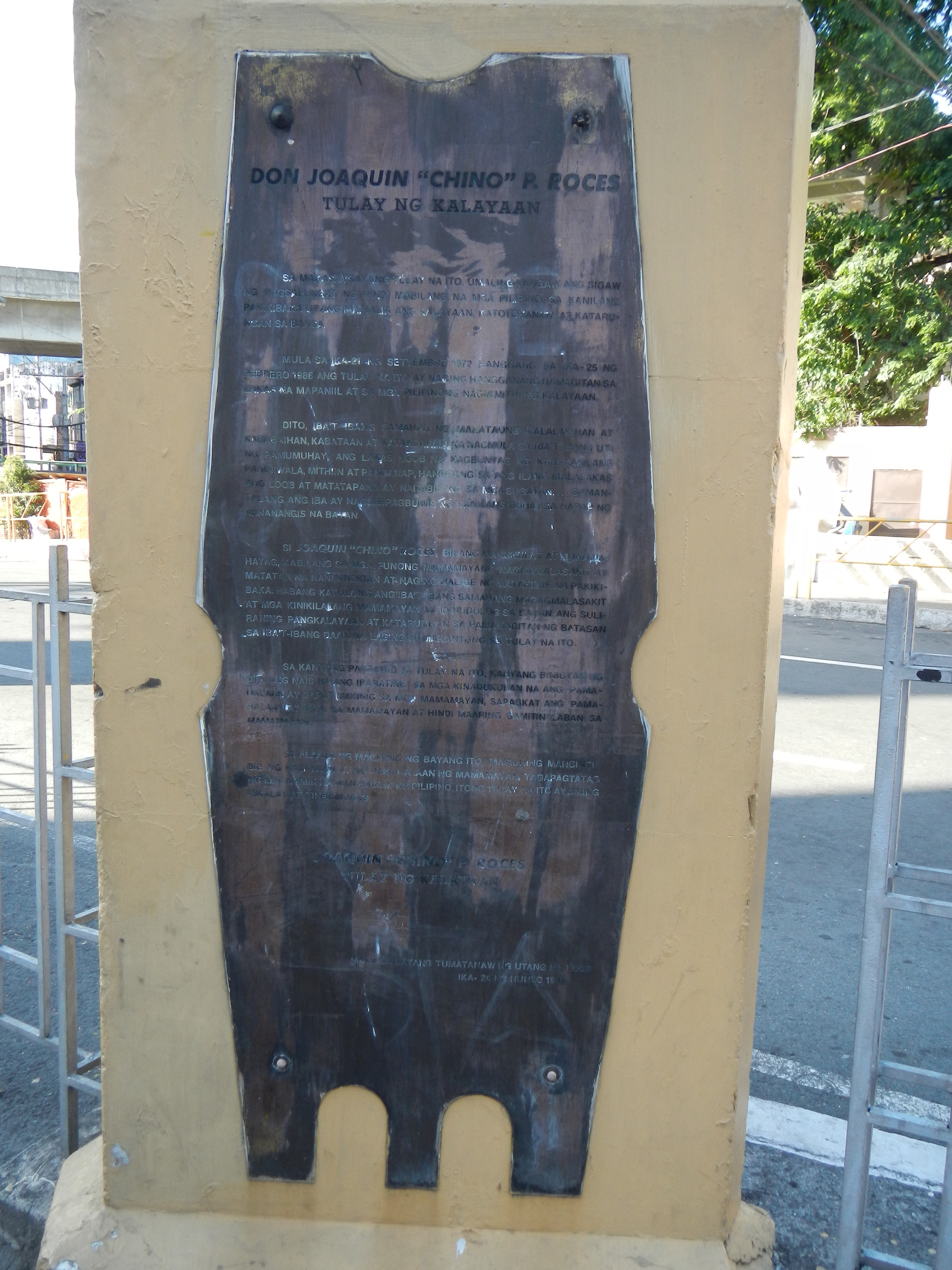
"Tulay ng Kalayaan" Historical marker ("Freedom Bridge" or "Chino Roces Bridge")

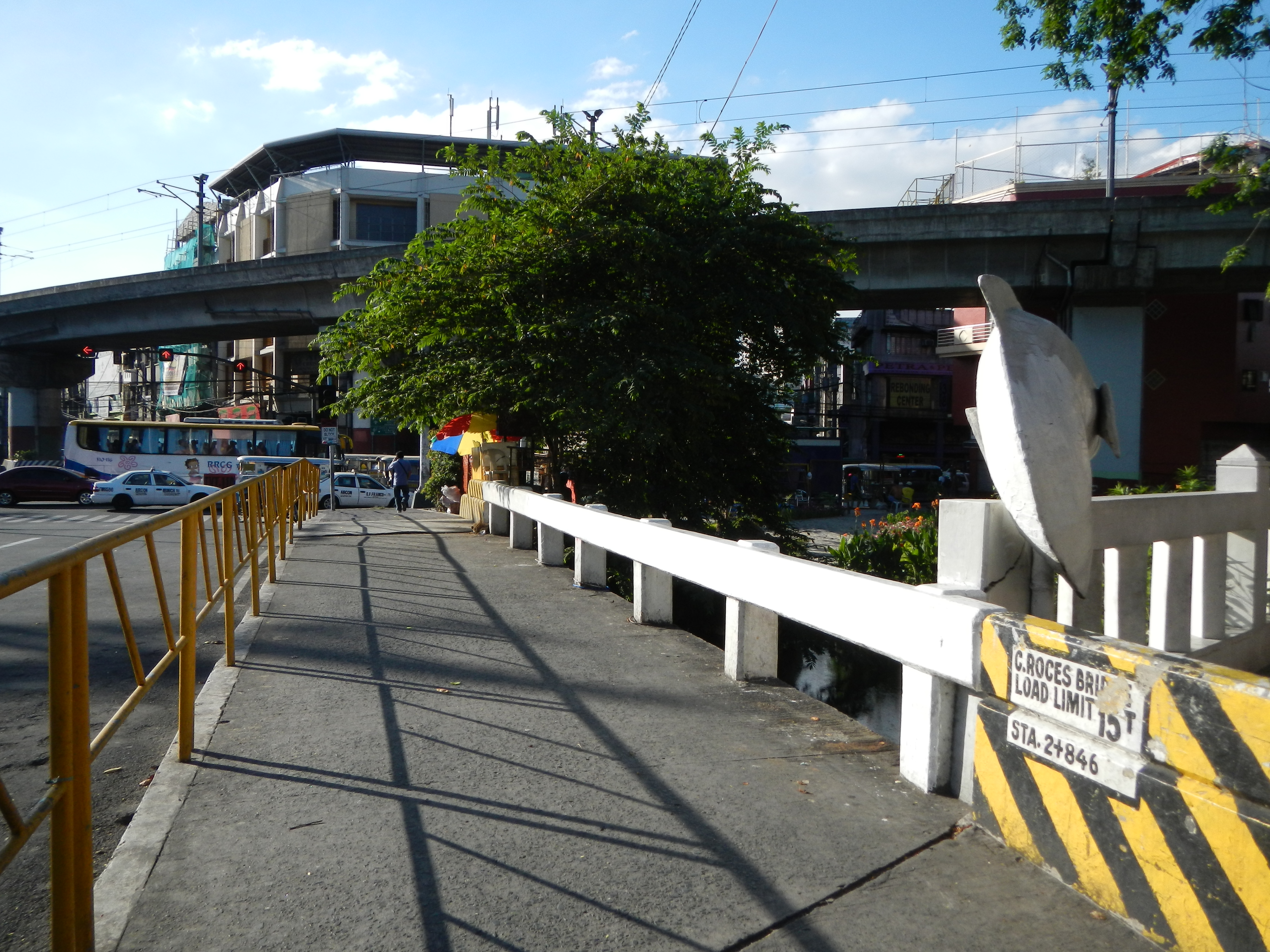
"Chino Roces Bridge"

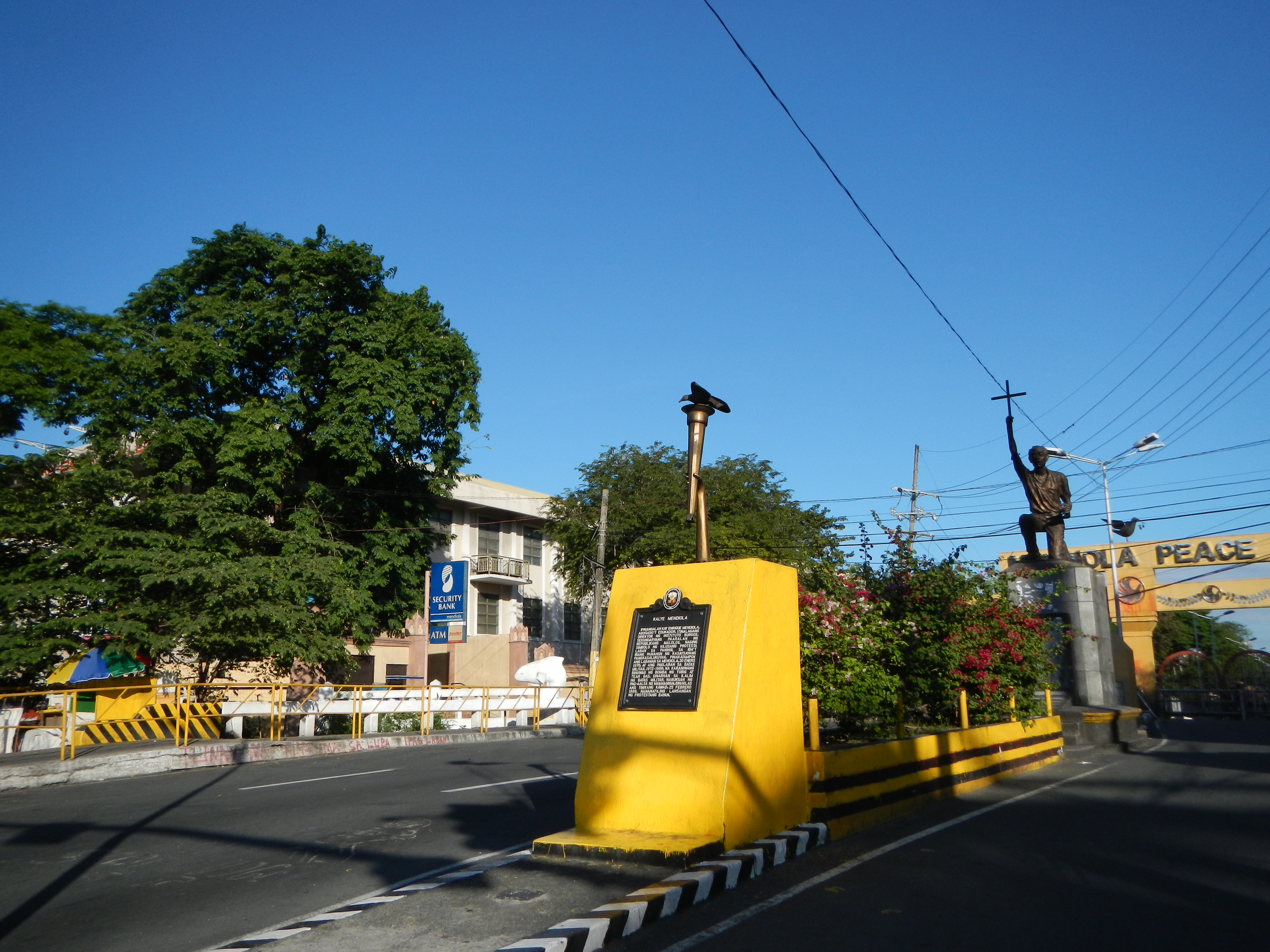
Facade of Mendiola Street

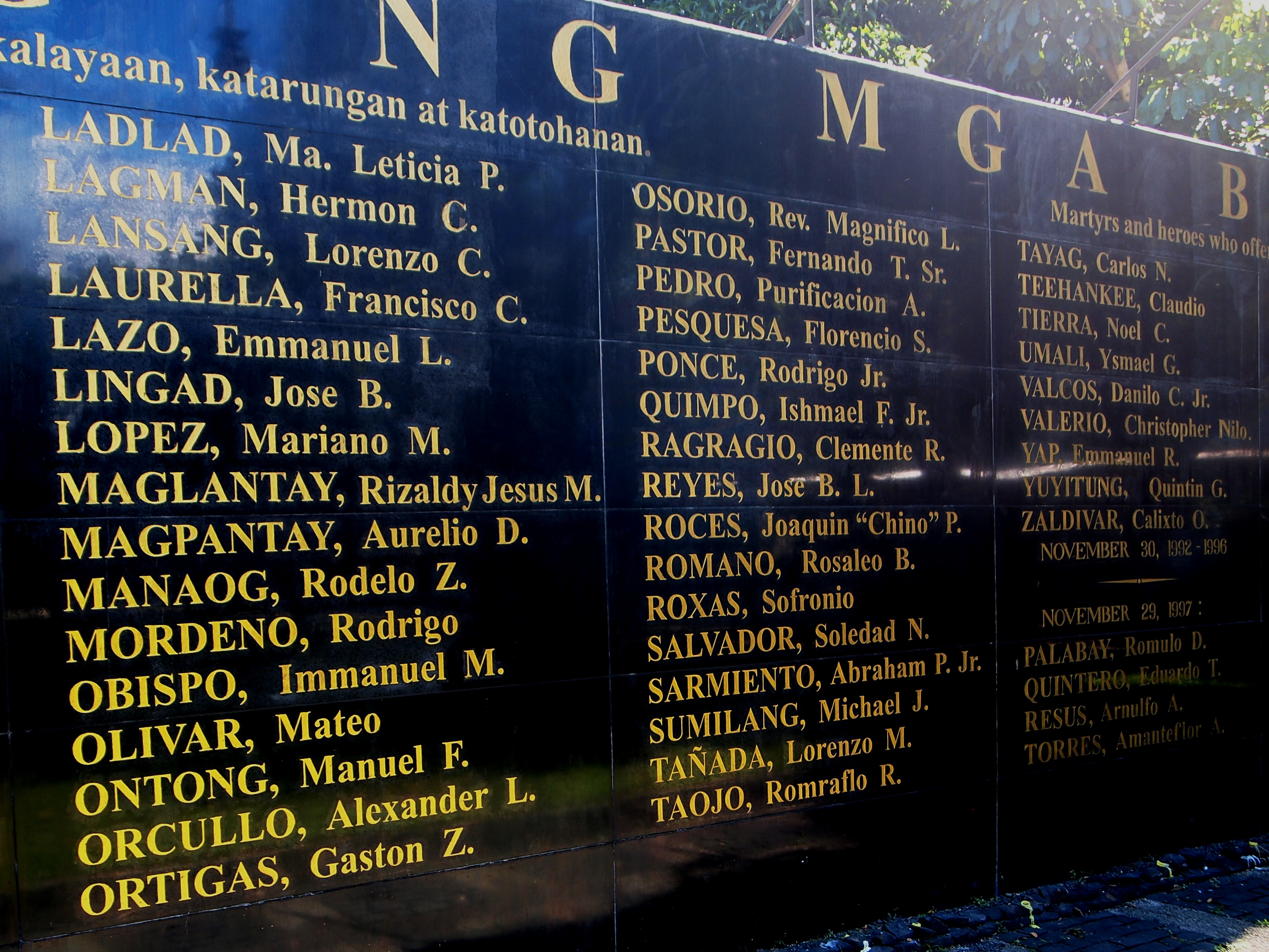
Detail of the Wall of Remembrance at the Bantayog ng mga Bayani, showing names from the first batch of Bantayog Honorees, including that of Joaquin "Chino" Roces.

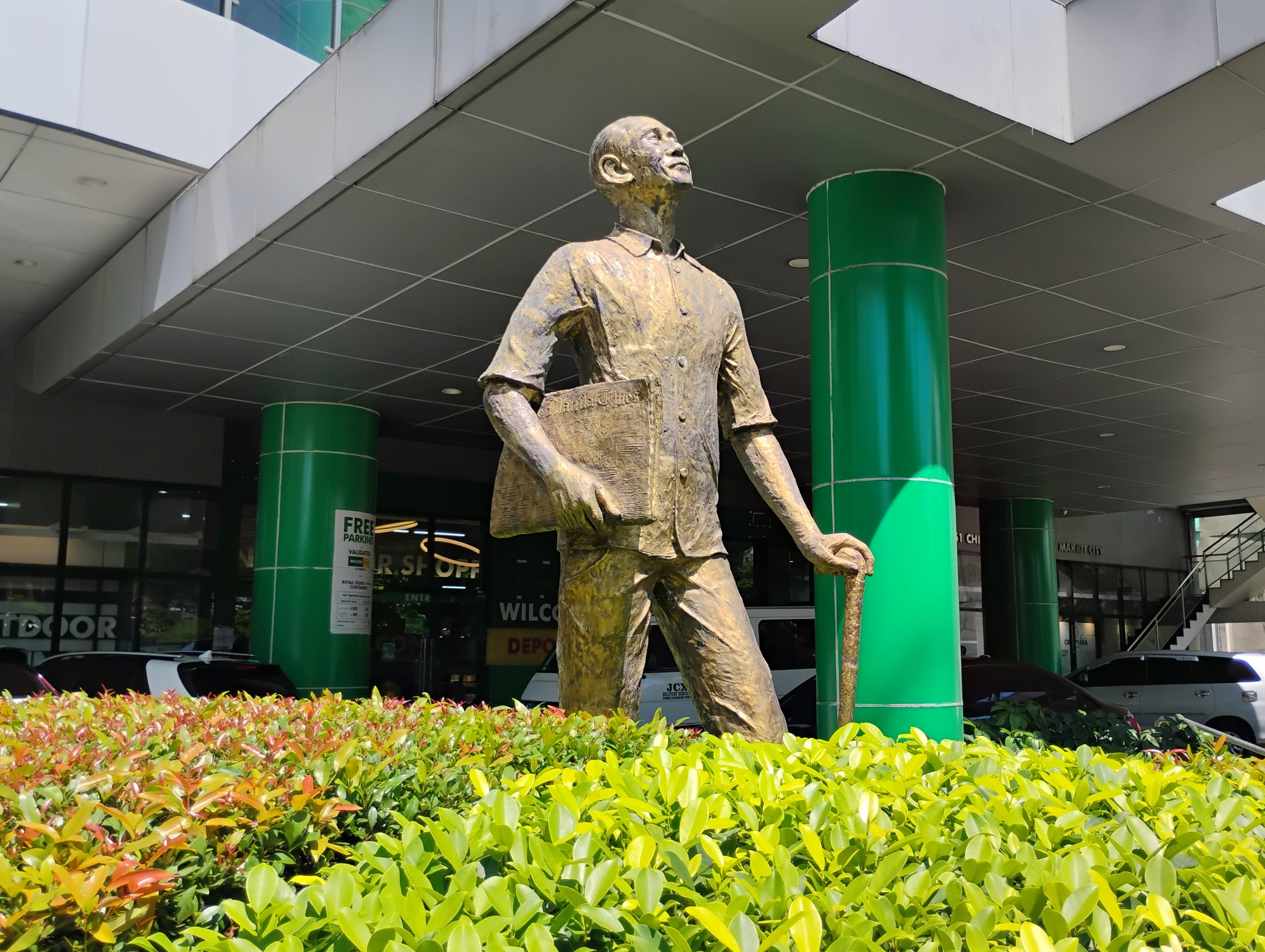
Chino Roces Monument along Chino Roces Avenue, Makati

== See also ==
- Leonard Peltier
