= Sulit TV =

Philippine digital set-top box

- Product type: DTT Set-top box
- Current owner: TV5 Network, Inc.
- Country: Philippines
- Introduced: September 10, 2021; 5 years ago
- Markets: Philippines
- Tagline: "Siksik sa saya, para sa buong pamilya" (Packed with fun, for the whole family)
- Website: www.tv5.com.ph/sulittv

Sulit TV (lit. 'worth it TV', stylized in lowercase) is a Philippine ISDB-Tb digital terrestrial television provider owned and operated by TV5 Network, Inc. The service distributes digital set-top boxes with free-to-air digital TV channels, multimedia player, video recorder, broadcast markup language, and emergency warning broadcast system features available in select areas in the Philippines. Sulit TV launched on September 10, 2021.

== Channel lineup ==
UHF Channel 18 (497.143 MHz)/UHF Channel 51 (695.143 MHz)^{1}

Channel	Video	Aspect	Short name	Programming	Notes
5.01	480i	16:9	TV5	TV5 (Main DWET-TV programming)	Commercial free-to-air broadcast
5.02	480i	16:9	RPTV	RPTV (Mirror feed from DTT 19)	Commercial free-to-air broadcast
5.03	480i	16:9	One Sports	One Sports	Commercial free-to-air broadcast
5.35	240p	16:9	One Seg S1	TV5	1seg broadcast

^{1} For Mega Manila only, channel and frequency varies on regional stations.

== Channel and frequency ==
Branding	Callsign	Ch. #	Frequency	Area of Coverage
TV5 Manila	DWET-TV	18 (Digital test broadcast)	497.143 MHz	Mega Manila, Central Luzon and Calabarzon
TV5 Manila	PA	51 (Mirror feed)	695.143 MHz	Mega Manila, Central Luzon and Calabarzon
TV5 Tuguegarao	DWZE-TV	18 (Digital test broadcast)	497.143 MHz	Tuguegarao/Cagayan Valley
TV5 Santiago	DWDH-DTV	18 (Digital test broadcast)	497.143 MHz	Santiago, Isabela/Cagayan Valley
TV5 Ilocos Norte	DWTE-TV	18 (Digital test broadcast)	497.143 MHz	Ilocos Norte/Northern Luzon
TV5 Ilocos Sur	DWDI-DTV	18 (Digital test broadcast)	497.143 MHz	Ilocos Sur/Northern Luzon
TV5 Abra	DWDI-DTV	18 (Digital test broadcast; SFN Relay)	497.143 MHz	Bangued, Abra/Cordillera Administrative Region
TV5 Baguio	DZET-TV	51 (Digital test broadcast)	695.143 MHz	Baguio and Dagupan/Northern and Central Luzon
TV5 Tarlac	DZJA-TV	18 (Digital test broadcast)	497.143 MHz	Capas, Tarlac/Central Luzon
TV5 Olongapo	D___-TV	18 (Digital test broadcast)	497.143 MHz	Olongapo, Zambales and Bataan/Central Luzon
TV5 Batangas	DWBD-TV	51 (Digital test broadcast)	695.143 MHz	Batangas/Calabarzon
TV5 San Pablo	DWBD-TV	51 (Digital test broadcast; SFN Relay)	695.143 MHz	San Pablo, Laguna/Calabarzon
TV5 Lucena	D___-DTV	18 (Digital test broadcast)	497.143 MHz	Lucena, Quezon Province/Calabarzon
TV5 Occidental Mindoro	D___-TV	18 (Digital test broadcast)	497.143 MHz	San Jose and Occidental Mindoro/Mimaropa
TV5 Puerto Princesa	DWDD-TV	18 (Digital test broadcast)	497.143 MHz	Puerto Princesa and Palawan/Mimaropa
TV5 Legazpi	DWLB-DTV	18 (Digital test broadcast)	497.143 MHz	Legazpi/Bicol Region
TV5 Aklan	DYCJ-TV	51 (Digital test broadcast)	695.143 MHz	Kalibo, Aklan/Western Visayas
TV5 Roxas	DYMD-DTV	18 (Digital test broadcast)	695.143 MHz	Roxas, Capiz/Western Visayas
TV5 Iloilo	DYMB-TV	18 (Digital test broadcast)	497.143 MHz	Iloilo and Guimaras/Western Visayas
TV5 Bacolod	DYTE-TV	18 (Digital test broadcast)	497.143 MHz	Bacolod/Negros Occidental
TV5 Cebu	DYET-TV	18 (Digital test broadcast)	497.143 MHz	Cebu/Central Visayas
TV5 Tacloban	DYPR-TV	50 (affiliate)	689.143 MHz	Tacloban/Eastern Visayas
TV5 Zamboanga	DXGB-TV	51 (Digital test broadcast)	695.143 MHz	Zamboanga City/Zamboanga Peninsula
TV5 Cagayan de Oro	DXTE-TV	18 (Digital test broadcast)	497.143 MHz	Cagayan de Oro/Northern Mindanao
TV5 Iligan	DX__-TV	18 (Digital test broadcast)	497.143 MHz	Iligan/Northern Mindanao
TV5 Davao	DXET-TV	18 (Digital test broadcast)	497.143 MHz	Davao/Davao Region
TV5 General Santos	DXER-TV	18 (Digital test broadcast)	497.143 MHz	General Santos/Soccsksargen
TV5 Butuan	DX__-TV	18 (Digital test broadcast)	497.143 MHz	Butuan/Caraga

== See also ==
- Digital terrestrial television in the Philippines
- ABS-CBN TV Plus
- GMA Affordabox
- Easy TV (defunct)
