= Yey! =

Programming block on Philippine television

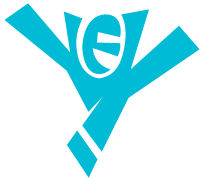
- Country: Philippines
- Network: ABS-CBN
- Headquarters: ABS-CBN Broadcasting Center, Quezon City, Metro Manila, Philippines

Programming
- Languages: Filipino (main & only anime & cartoons); English (secondary); Japanese (secondary, only anime songs)
- Picture format: 480i (SDTV)

Ownership
- Owner: ABS-CBN Corporation
- Sister channels: Asianovela Channel (defunct); Cine Mo!; DZMM TeleRadyo; Jeepney TV (free trial); Knowledge Channel; Myx (free trial); Movie Central (defunct); O Shopping (defunct)

History
- Founded: November 23, 2010; 15 years ago
- Launched: January 3, 2011; 15 years ago February 11, 2015; 11 years ago (ABS-CBN TVplus); November 6, 2021; 4 years ago (relaunch as a programming block on Jeepney TV, A2Z and Kapamilya Channel); April 14, 2024; 2 years ago (All TV as a programming block on Jeepney TV (2024–2026) & Kapamilya Channel (since 2026))
- Closed: June 30, 2020; 5 years ago (broadcast franchise lapsed/expired; Metro Manila Only); July 1, 2020; 5 years ago (as a Nationwide Digital Channel)

Links
- Website: Archived official website at the Wayback Machine (archived 2020-08-12)

Yey! (stylized as YeY!) is a Philippine children's programming block created by ABS-CBN Corporation, and was one of the freemium channels of ABS-CBN TV Plus. Yey! was the second animation channel of ABS-CBN, after Hero TV. The channel aired Filipino-dubbed Japanese anime series and foreign cartoon shows, along with imported programming from ABS-CBN's former main channel and Hero TV.

== History ==
=== Pre-launch as the TV channel (2010–2020) ===
On November 23, 2010, ABS-CBN filed the "Yey!" trademark for the preparation of the channel's launch. The logo used was the balloons on a sky background with the text.

Yey! was then launched in the following year as a digital free-to-air channel. On February 11, 2015, the channel became available on ABS-CBN TV Plus in the digital box channel 4.

On June 30, 2020, the channel ceased broadcasting permanently due to a cease-and-desist order issued by the National Telecommunications Commission (NTC) and Solicitor General Jose Calida. On September 10, 2020, the frequency for Yey! (from channel 43) was recalled by the NTC. In January 2022, the former frequency for Yey! was awarded to Apollo Quiboloy's Sonshine Media Network International (SMNI) until its 30-day suspension on December 19, 2023.

=== Programming block (2021–present) ===
On November 6, 2021, Yey! was relaunched as a programming block on Kapamilya Channel, A2Z (under "Kidz Toon Time" and "Kidz Weekend"), and Jeepney TV. Cardcaptor Sakura: Clear Card resumed airing on A2Z and completed all the episodes.

On April 14, 2024, select programming from Yey!, including reruns of various ABS-CBN-produced fantasy drama series, was broadcast on ALLTV2. This channel also featured content from Jeepney TV until January 1, 2026, before transitioning to a new programming block on the Kapamilya Channel.

== Programming ==
Anime series and cartoon programs were divided into various programming blocks.

- All Yey! Anime – The channel's flagship primetime block featuring Japanese anime series intended for all audiences. It was aired every Mondays to Fridays from 5:00 pm to 9:00 pm, and on Saturdays and Sundays from 9:00 pm to 10:00 pm.
- Nickelodeon sa Yey! – The channel's daytime block consisting of cartoons from Nickelodeon and Nick Jr. It was aired every Mondays to Sundays from 9:00 am to 1:00 pm.
- Bibolilits – A morning block that airs selected foreign cartoons intended for pre-schoolers and young children. It was aired every Mondays to Sundays from 6:30 am to 8:30 am.
- Ka-Pow! – A weekday afternoon block consisting of foreign cartoons. It was aired every Mondays to Fridays from 1:00 PM to 3:00 PM.
- Power Hour – A weekend afternoon block consisting of selected live-action series, toys-themed anime series, and foreign cartoons. It was aired every Saturdays and Sundays from 1:00 pm to 3:00 pm.
- Fam-Time – An afternoon block consisting of classic anime series (most of them are from the World Masterpiece Theater anime franchise) every weekdays, re-runs of selected ABS-CBN programs every weekends, and channel-produced programs that are considered child-friendly and family-oriented. It was aired Mondays to Sundays from 3:30 pm to 5:00 pm.
- Kid Sine – A weekend movie block that was aired from 5:00 pm to 9:00 pm, featuring classic local films every Saturdays, and Tagalog-dubbed foreign films every Sundays.
