= GMA Affordabox =

Philippine digital set-top box

- Product type: DTT Set-top box; DTT Mobile TV Dongle
- Current owner: GMA Network, Inc.
- Produced by: QiSheng Electronics Company Ltd.
- Country: Philippines
- Introduced: June 26, 2020; 6 years ago
- Markets: Philippines
- Ambassadors: For GMA Affordabox: Heart Evangelista; Michael V. Marian Rivera; Dingdong Dantes; Richard Yap; Bea Alonzo; For GMA Now: Alden Richards
- Website: www.gmanetwork.com/affordabox

GMA Affordabox is a Philippine ISDB-Tb digital terrestrial television provider distributed and marketed by GMA New Media, a subsidiary of GMA Network. The service distributes digital set-top boxes and USB OTG dongles with free-to-air digital TV channels, broadcast markup language, emergency warning broadcast system, functional auto-on alert, digital display, and info display services to select areas in the Philippines.

== History ==
In June 2010, the National Telecommunications Commission (NTC) announced that it would adopt the ISDB-T standard for digital broadcasting and issued a circular commanding that all the Country's television networks to switch-off their analog services on December 31, 2015, at 11:59 p.m. Philippine Standard Time (UTC+8). Due to the delay of the release of implementing rules and regulations for digital television broadcast, the target date was moved to 2023, but it was later moved to 2026 due to constraints on the migration.

In February 2013, GMA Network conducted field tests of digital broadcast using the Japanese standard ISDB-T in digital television on UHF Channel 27 (551.143 MHz), remaining unconvinced saying "European standard DVB-T2 is superior to ISDB-T." In October 2013, the NTC issued a draft memorandum to adopt the Japanese/Brazilian standard as the sole standard in the delivery of digital terrestrial television (DTT) services in the Philippines.

On May 15, 2019, GMA's digital broadcast was moved to its permanent frequency on Channel 15, due to its former frequency, Channel 27 being used by GMA News TV on June 4, 2019, as a deal between GMA and ZOE Broadcasting Network terminated, resulting to the channel's former frequency Channel 11 became silent on June 5, 2019 (which later became A2Z since October 10, 2020).

In June 2020, images of GMA's owned DTV set-top box were online and a teaser was revealed on June 17, 2020. GMA Network launched GMA Affordabox on June 26, 2020 during Tutok to Win sa Wowowin.

=== GMA Now ===
On December 12, 2020, GMA Network released its mobile dongle designed for USB OTG-capable Android smartphone, dubbed as GMA Now on Lazada and Shopee online. It allows users to watch free-to-air channels on their Android smartphones and has features such as video-on-demand to stream GMA's online content, a web chat, and interactive promotions to join. It supports Picture-in-picture mode and screen recording. GMA Network launched GMA Now on February 7, 2021 during All-Out Sundays, and announced it will support for iPhone users.

== See also ==
- Digital terrestrial television in the Philippines
- ABS-CBN TV Plus
- Easy TV (defunct)
- Sulit TV
