= Easy TV (Philippines) =

Former digital terrestrial TV service

- Product type: DTT Set-top box
- Current owner: Solar Entertainment Corporation
- Country: Philippines
- Introduced: May 25, 2018
- Discontinued: September 30, 2019
- Markets: Philippines
- Website: Archived official website at the Wayback Machine (archived 2019-07-24)

Easy TV Home was an ISDB-T encrypted digital terrestrial television service operated by Solar Digital Media Holdings, Inc., a subsidiary of Solar Entertainment Corporation. Originally a mobile TV dongle service, it later distributed digital set-top boxes, as well as freemium digital TV channels. Until its discontinuation on September 30, 2019, due to poor sales, Easy TV was receivable in selected areas in Metro Manila and parts of nearby provinces.

== Channel lineup ==
Digital frequency	Channel	Video	Aspect	Short name	Programming
UHF 21 (515.143 MHz)	21.02	480i	16:9	SolarFlix	SolarFlix
UHF 21 (515.143 MHz)	21.03	480i	16:9	Solar Sports	Solar Sports
UHF 21 (515.143 MHz)	21.04	480i	16:9	DepEd TV	Solar Learning (DepEd TV)
UHF 21 (515.143 MHz)	21.05	480i	16:9	Shop TV	E-Novation TV

A recent notice on the website states that only free-to-air channels can be viewed on set-top boxes after September 30, 2019, with EasyTV ceasing commercial operations due to low sales and stiff competition from rival ABS-CBN TV Plus.

== See also ==
- ABS-CBN TV Plus
- GMA Affordabox
- Sulit TV
