= ABS-CBN Mobile =

Mobile virtual network operator in the Philippines

- A variant of the ABS-CBN Mobile logo. (November 16, 2013 - December 1, 2018)
- Type: Mobile virtual network operator
- Industry: Cellular network
- Founded: November 16, 2013; 12 years ago
- Defunct: December 1, 2018; 7 years ago
- Headquarters: ELJ Communications Center, Eugenio Lopez Drive, Diliman, Quezon City, Philippines
- Key people: Fernando Villar (Head) Iniga Irana, Ellen Pompeo, Kristal
- Products: iWant; Voice; SMS; Data packages/promos
- Services: Prepaid and Postpaid SMS; Voice; Data; Wireless landline connection; Video on Demand; Pay per view
- Owner: ABS-CBN Convergence

ABS-CBN Mobile (stylized as ABS-CBNmobile) was a cellular telephony service provider in the Philippines owned and operated by ABS-CBN Convergence, a subsidiary of ABS-CBN. ABS-CBNmobile formerly uses the network infrastructures of Globe Telecom under a network-sharing agreement which allows ABS-CBN and Globe to share frequencies, switches, servers, and transmitters. ABS-CBNmobile formerly offers prepaid and postpaid SMS, voice, data, wireless landline connection (postpaid only), and access to premium and exclusive contents of iWant TV.

Globe Telecom and ABS-CBN announced that it will shut down the service by November 30, 2018, due to income losses and stiff competition from Telecommunications providers such as PLDT/Smart. The service was officially discontinued on December 1, 2018.

== History ==
On May 28, 2013, entertainment and media conglomerate ABS-CBN and wireless telecommunications giant Globe Telecom signed a historic network-sharing agreement which allows the two companies to share assets such as frequencies, switches, servers, and transmitters and allows ABS-CBN to offer its own prepaid and postpaid SMS, voice, and data services to its own targeted market. ABS-CBN will then pay Globe based on the amount of bandwidth used and for other technical and support expenses. Also part of the deal was the sale of Lopez Holding's Bayan Telecommunications (BayanTel) to Globe through a debt purchase agreement. The National Telecommunications Commission approved the deal on June 8, 2013. ABS-CBN Corporation, on the other hand, has announced that it would invest 2 to 3 billion pesos in the next two years to the said service.

The mobile network service was supposed to be launched in early September but it was postponed due to operational issues. On November 16, 2013, during the "Tulong Na, Tabang Na, Tayo Na" benefit concert of ABS-CBN for the Typhoon Haiyan victims at the Smart Araneta Coliseum, the service was officially launched to the public. Actor Piolo Pascual stated that the first 100 thousand sim cards were sent to the survivors of the said typhoon in the Visayas region for free to help restore communications among the members of the family. On November 18, 2013, a television advertisement featuring Kim Chiu, Piolo Pascual, Enrique Gil and John Lloyd Cruz was officially previewed.

On December 11, 2013, the first ABS-CBNmobile store and service center opened at the ground floor level of ELJ Communications Center. ABS-CBN Corporation chairman Eugenio Lopez III and its president and CEO Charo Santos-Concio was present during the opening along with celebrity endorsers Julia Montes and Erich Gonzales.

ABS-CBNmobile has partnered with smartphone brands CloudFone, Huawei, and 0+ USA for smartphone packages with pre-installed ABS-CBNmobile sim card, mobile apps (such as iWant TV), and a limited trial period of the ABS-CBNmobile services. ABS-CBNmobile also partnered with KakaoTalk for free online messaging as well as to Viber, Line, WeChat, and WhatsApp for paid online messaging. ABS-CBNmobile also partnered with SM Supermalls, Walter Mart Philippines, 7-Eleven Philippines, Mini Stop Philippines, Vmobile, Telepreneur, Corp., ULoad, and Load Central for the expansion of ABS-CBNmobile sim cards, prepaid load cards, and postpaid payment centers. On December 1, 2016, ABS-CBNmobile launched their own 4G LTE service. As of 2016, ABS-CBNmobile has a subscriber base of 904,000 bringing its losses to 600 million pesos down from 700 million pesos a year ago.

On July 16, 2018, ABS-CBN and Globe Telecom announced that it will not renew their network-sharing agreement after assessing its mobile business model as financially unsustainable, making ABS-CBNmobile shut down during the year. The two companies will remain committed for partnership for content sharing using its existing resources. And it was officially posted on their website and social media accounts on October 16, 2018, the shutdown of the mobile network-sharing agreement and services until November 30, 2018, at 11:59 PM. From December 1, 2018, onwards, it was officially discontinued of all services and the network signal from Globe will be permanently deactivated until further notice. Meanwhile, all ABS-CBN mobile prepaid SIM subscribers can claim a new free SIM with 2GB of data and access to KBO online in selected Smart partner outlets. The qualified subsidy as all ABS-CBN mobile prepaid subscribers with active SIM and receive an SIM swap message from ABS-CBN mobile.
