= Television in the Philippines =

Television was first introduced to the Philippines in October 1953, with the first commercial broadcast by Alto Broadcasting System (now ABS-CBN). This made the Philippines the first Southeast Asian country and the second Asian country to air television broadcasts. During the late 1940s, Filipino engineers and students conducted academic experiments related to broadcasting.

From 1975 to 1978, the Philippine Academy for Television Arts and Sciences (PATAS) presented the SINAG Awards.

The Star Awards for Television, the country's oldest existing television awards show, is presented annually by the Philippine Movie Press Club (PMPC) after a vote by members of the press.

The Philippines does not operate any independent public broadcasting television networks. However, there are several government-owned networks.

== History ==
=== The Early Years (1946–1959) ===
James Lindenberg, nicknamed the "Father of Philippine Television," was an American-born Filipino engineer who established the Bolinao Electronics Corporation (BEC) on June 13, 1946, following his work assembling transmitters. The company was named after Bolinao, Pangasinan, the hometown of his wife, Soledad S. Lindenberg. In 1949, he became one of the first individuals to apply for a license from the Philippine Congress to establish a television station. Lindenberg's application was approved on June 14, 1950. However, due to the scarcity of raw materials and strict import restrictions under the Import Control Act, he decided to shift to radio broadcasting instead.

Lindenberg's failed attempt to establish a television station resulted in the BEC falling under new management. Antonio Quirino, a judge and brother of the then-president of the Philippines, Elpidio Quirino, attempted to get a license from Congress that would allow him to set up a television station. However, Congress denied his request, primarily out of fear that he would use the station as a tool to spread propaganda about his brother, who was running for a second term in the presidential elections of 1953. As a result, Quirino bought a 70% share in BEC, which indirectly granted him control of a television franchise. He changed the name of BEC to Alto Broadcasting System (ABS) after the names of its new owners: Aleli and Judge Antonio Quirino. After the name change, Lindenberg continued to serve as the co-owner and general manager.

Before its official launch, the television station encountered numerous challenges. For example, the Central Bank of the Philippines refused to grant Quirino credit, stating that the venture was too risky. Due to this, Quirino asked for help from his friend Marvin Gray, whose family was friends with David Sarnoff, the then-president of Radio Corporation of America (RCA). Through Gray's intervention, Quirino was able to get assistance from the RCA.

Before the first telecast, Quirino imported 120 television sets using the 60,000 pesos loan that he had received from the owner of Joe's Electric. In exchange for the loan, Joe's Electric was the first corporation granted the rights to sell television sets in the Philippines.

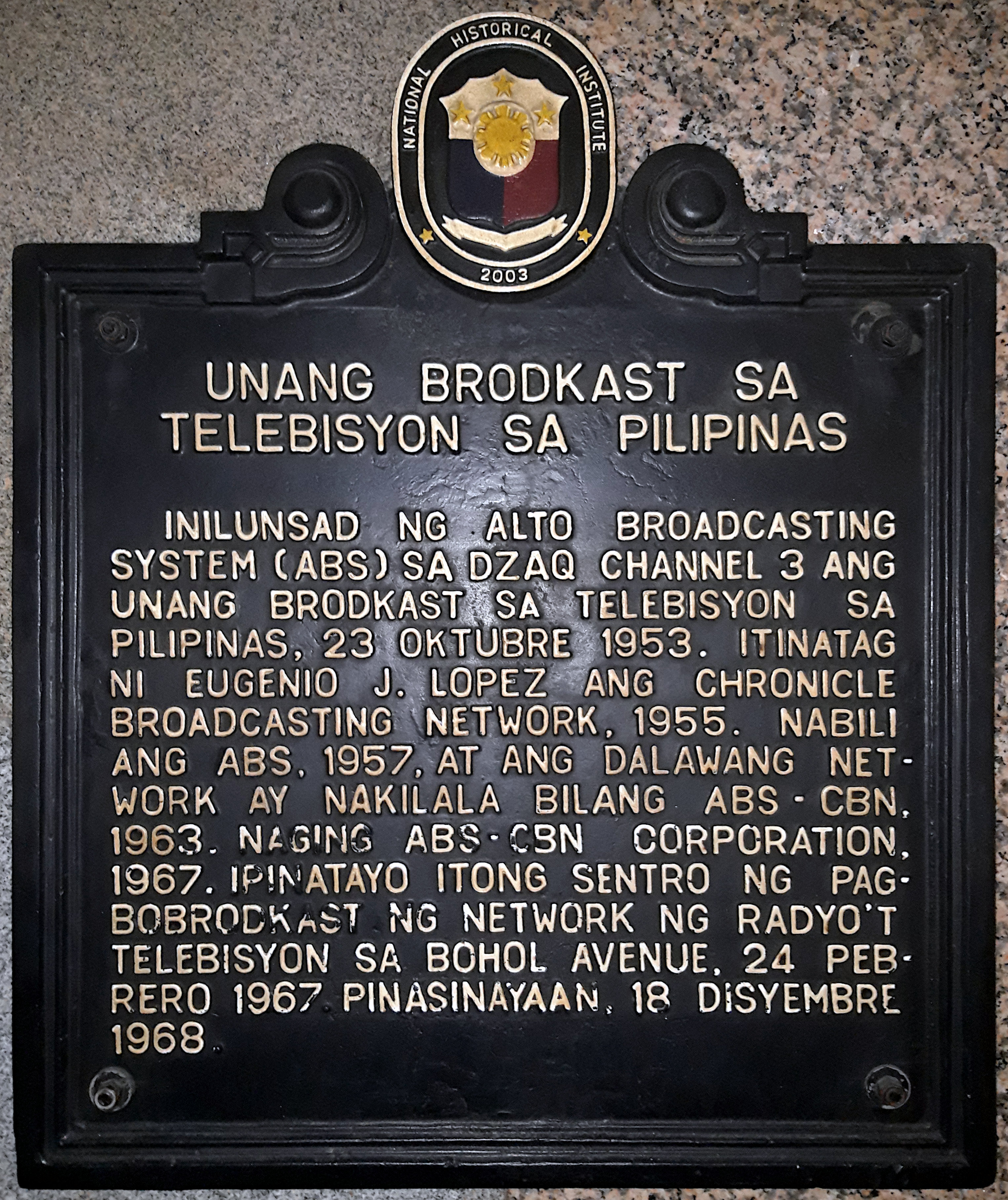
National historical marker installed in 2003 at ABS-CBN's broadcast center in Quezon City commemorating the very first television broadcast by ABS, in 1953

On October 23, 1953, Quirino marked the first official television broadcast in the Philippines with the launch of ABS DZAQ-TV Channel 3 (DZAQ-TV 3). With the help of RCA, four men underwent technical training in the United States: Arcadio Carandang, Romualdo Carballo, Harry Chaney, and Jose Navarro.

The ABS studio was first established in a makeshift barn that was on Florentino Torres Street in Manila. Using a transmitter acquired from RCA, its telecasts reached neighboring provinces far beyond the initial expectations that broadcasts would only cover Manila. While the four engineers were sent to the United States for training, most ABS personnel gained their expertise through hands-on experience. The station's first transmitter was located in San Juan, Rizal.

DZAQ-TV 3 began with a four-hour daily broadcast schedule, airing from 6:00 p.m. to 10:00 p.m. Although ABS secured 52 advertisers for its premiere telecast, selling commercial spots for regular programming proved challenging as radio advertising remained a more cost-effective option for advertisers at the time.

The programs aired at that time were usually borrowed films from foreign embassies, imported cowboy movies, and coverage of a variety of real-world events. When the station ran out of new features, stage plays were adapted to television. In 1953, less than a month after the first telecast, Father James Reuter SJ, who had radio and television training, produced the first play on Philippine television entitled Cyrano de Bergerac. The three-hour-long play was aired live, and all the actors were students.

In the beginning, Philippine TV networks would buy the rights to air American TV programs and serials since it was cheaper than producing local shows. To entice advertisers, as well as to encourage increased viewership, simultaneous airing of programs on radio and television resorted to promotional gimmicks. Many popular radio shows, including Tawag ng Tanghalan, Kuwentong Kutsero, and Student Canteen, started their lives on TV this way.

In 1955, Radiowealth Inc. was one of the first companies in the Philippines to begin manufacturing television sets, with other local manufacturers like Carlsound and Rehco following close behind. As more assembly lines were established and the industry continued to grow, the normally prohibitive cost of having to buy television sets or their various components overseas was dramatically reduced. The following year, businessmen Eugenio and Fernando Lopez started the Chronicle Broadcasting Network (CBN), which was initially a radio-centric enterprise. However, when the Philippines lifted a high tax on imported TV shows in 1958, CBN began to branch out into the television industry as well.

Early that same year, CBN acquired ABS from Quirino and merged the two companies under a new name: the Bolinao Electronics Corporation. With the establishment of DZXL-TV Channel 9 on April 19, 1958, the Lopez brothers were now in control of two of the largest networks in the Philippines. As a result of this merger, the combined ABS (DZAQ-TV Channel 3) and CBN (DZXL-TV Channel 9) television stations moved to their new studios in Roxas Boulevard in Pasay, and the ABS radio facilities moved to the Chronicle Building in Manila’s Intramuros District, which also housed the CBN Radio studios.

=== Rising popularity (1960–1973) ===
At the turn of the next decade, TV set demand in urban areas soared. Other VHF TV stations also opened around this period. These include DZTV-TV (established on March 1, 1960, by Inter-Island Broadcasting Corporation (IBC), owned by Dick Baldwin and later Andrés Soriano Sr. of San Miguel Corporation), DZBB-TV (established on October 29, 1961, by Republic Broadcasting System (RBS), owned by Robert Stewart), DZFM-TV (established in 1961 by the Philippine Broadcasting Service of the Philippine government, now defunct), DZRH-TV (established on April 11, 1962, by the Manila Broadcasting Company (MBC), owned by Manuel "Manolo" Elizalde Sr.), DZTM-TV (established in July 1962, by Associated Broadcasting Corporation (ABC), owned by Chino Roces, the publisher of The Manila Times), DZFU-TV (established in August 1962, by FEATI University, now defunct), and DZKB-TV (established on October 15, 1969, by Kanlaon Broadcasting System (KBS), owned by Roberto Benedicto). Among the top-rated programs in the 1960s were The Nida-Nestor Show, Buhay Artista, and Pancho Loves Tita. Another top-rated local show was Tawag ng Tanghalan, the amateur singing contest hosted by Lopito and Patsy.

Following the success of the first locally produced television drama Hiwaga sa Bahay na Bato in 1963, BEC's DZAQ-TV Channel 3 staged the first colorized test television broadcast using the NTSC system of the Radio Corporation of America and would begin to broadcast in color in 1966. Channel 3 also surpassed competitors when it came to educational television initiatives with a one-hour daily slot in the early years of the decade, with Inter-Island 13 following suit.

On February 1, 1967, the corporate name of BEC was changed to ABS-CBN Broadcasting Corporation. In August 2007, the company again changed its name to ABS-CBN Corporation to reflect the media conglomerate's diversification, with the name ABS-CBN Broadcasting Corporation being used secondarily in some contexts since then. During the same year, Radiowealth Inc. pioneered the production of 19-, 21-, and 25-inch models of color TV sets. Moreover, ABS-CBN was favored by advertisers like Procter and Gamble, the Philippine Refining Company, Colgate-Palmolive, Del Rosario Brothers, and Caltex. On November 14–15, ABS-CBN broadcast a 36-hour marathon coverage of the 1967 Philippine Senate elections under its coverage name Halalan '67.

In 1969, Filipinos witnessed the live television coverage of the Apollo 11 historic moon landing. It was the first live telecast via satellite in the country. Channels 5, 7, and 13 tied up for this, while ABS-CBN produced its color coverage on DZXL-TV Channel 9 under the name Man on the Moon. On November 14, 1969, DZAQ-TV transferred from Channel 3 to Channel 2, while its sister station DZXL-TV transferred from Channel 9 to Channel 4. On October 15, 1969, Kanlaon Broadcasting System (KBS) launched its television network with DZKB-TV Channel 9, which would broadcast in full color. On November 11, ABS-CBN became the first network to use chroma key in Halalan '69, for the 1969 Philippine presidential election, while ABC-5, RBS-7, and IBC-13 once again collaborated for the multi-network coverage with Election '69.

By the late 1960s, news and public affairs programs were pioneered by ABS-CBN and ABC. The Big News (in English) on ABC's DZTM-TV Channel 5, first anchored by Bong Lapira and later by Jose Mari Velez, and The World Tonight (in English) on ABS-CBN's DZAQ-TV Channel 2, anchored by Henry Halasan, were the first news programs on Philippine television, followed in that same period by NewsWatch (in English) of KBS's DZKB-TV Channel 9 and NewsBreak (in English) on ABS-CBN's DZXL-TV Channel 4, featuring Lapira. ABS-CBN pioneered Filipino-language news programming in the primetime slots, with DZAQ-TV Channel 2 having Balita Ngayon, once anchored by Ric Tierro, and DZXL-TV Channel 4 having Apat na Sulok ng Daigdig, with Orly Mercado as its first presenter. IBC-13 followed up with Mayor Villegas Reports, co-produced with the Manila city government, and National Television News (in English) featuring future NewsWatch anchor Harry Gasser. MBC's DZRH-TV Channel 11 dominated late-night news programs with The 11th Hour News. In 1969, ABS-CBN debuted This Week's News, the first weekend news broadcast in the nation.

By 1971, the Philippines, through Radiowealth Inc., had become the third country in the world to manufacture color TV sets. By January 1972, the Philippine television industry had experienced significant growth. Following ABS-CBN's pioneering satellite broadcasts, television stations began opening across the country, starting in 1961 with DYCB-TV Channel 3 in Cebu City, the first provincial television station. It featured four hours of locally produced programming, alongside relays of Manila-based shows.

=== Martial law era (1973–1986) ===
When President Ferdinand Marcos declared martial law in September 1972, he ordered the takeover of media firms. Government troops entered radio and television stations and placed them under military control. All media outlets that were critical of the Marcos administration were padlocked and sequestered.

ABS-CBN was seized by the Office of Press Secretary and the National Media Production Center, and DZXL-TV Channel 4 was renamed DWGT-TV Channel 4 (PTV-4), the government-owned channel. KBS, IBC, and RBS were later allowed to operate with limited three-month permits. ABS-CBN was seized from the Lopez family, and Eugenio Lopez Jr., president of ABS-CBN, was imprisoned. By late 1973, RBS, which was then under blocktimer Philippine Productions, was sold to Felipe Gozon, who was also the lawyer of Robert Stewart, because foreigners were not allowed to own businesses in the Philippines. RBS later changed its name to GMA Radio-Television Arts (now GMA Network), popularly known as GMA-7.

On June 6, 1973, a fire destroyed the KBS television studios (originally, the ABS and CBN television studios) on Roxas Boulevard, Pasay. Benedicto took control of the ABS-CBN broadcast center on Bohol Avenue, Quezon City. ABS-CBN, as a network, ceased operations for the next 14 years, and its studios became the broadcasting center of Benedicto's KBS and the government's GTV. A year later, ABS-CBN's DZAQ-TV Channel 2 would reopen as DWWX-TV Channel 2 under Benedicto's Banahaw Broadcasting Corporation (BBC). In 1976, GTV-4 began color broadcasts.

The Benedicto networks—BBC; KBS, which became Radio Philippines Network (RPN) in 1975; and IBC—served as vehicles of propaganda for the Marcos government while also broadcasting local and overseas entertainment and sports. In 1979, the Benedicto networks moved to the newly built Broadcast City in Diliman, Quezon City. In the same year, Gregorio Cendaña was named Minister of Information. In 1980, GTV-4 was relaunched as Maharlika Broadcasting System (MBS-4).

Initially, the Department of Public Information (later Ministry of Public Information) reviewed everything that was to be aired on radio and TV and set up the rules and regulations. Through other government agencies, policies on ownership, allocation of frequencies, station distribution, and program standards were promulgated. In 1973, the Kapisanan ng mga Brodkaster sa Pilipinas was created, and this agency allowed for self-regulation. A year later, a presidential decree created the Broadcast Media Council.

The 1974 Miss Universe Pageant, the 1975 Muhammad Ali-Joe Frazier heavyweight fight, and the 1981 visit of Pope John Paul II were shown across the world. When Benigno Aquino was assassinated in 1983, it was a small item on television news. During his historic funeral procession, GMA was allowed only ten seconds of airtime coverage exclusively on the late-night news program The 11:30 Report. For most of the late 1970s to the early 1980s, RPN and IBC were the most-watched channels in terms of ratings. However, in the years leading up to the People Power Revolution, GMA—which was the only independent station—managed to beat the Benedicto-owned duopoly and stayed in the position for the next two years.

The martial law era also jump-started the beginnings of satellite broadcasts linking the entire country by ABS-CBN through trial runs, soon followed by RPN and MBS, which started simulcasts of programs from Manila to the provinces across the country, followed by GMA and BBC. Cable television also began in the late 1970s when the government, through the DPI, created the first true cable television firm after years of trials that began in 1969: the Benedicto-owned Sining Makulay Inc.

In 1984, Imee Marcos, daughter of Ferdinand Marcos, tried to take over the GMA network, but she was successfully prevented by GMA executives, Menardo Jimenez and Felipe Gozon. Afterward, GMA founder Robert Stewart decided to move back to the United States and retire following his utter dissatisfaction with the Marcos regime. The resistance of network leadership would trigger the beginning of the end of Marcos's dominance in the television industry. In 1985, GMA broke from the pack when it began airing interviews with Benigno's widow, Corazon, in the lead-up to her presidential campaign and the 1986 snap presidential elections that followed.

In addition, the martial law period also jump-started an offshoot of current affairs programming—public service and non-news informative programs. GMA Network's Kapwa Ko, Mahal Ko, launched in the fall of 1975, was the first and longest-running public service TV program in the Philippines. It helped millions of viewers to be aware of medical issues, especially among the poor and lower middle class. Its success in providing medical care to indigent and poor families, as well as its revelations on the state of health facilities in far-flung communities, led to the creation of the Kapwa Ko Mahal Ko Foundation (KKMK) in 1976 to collect donations for patients featured on the show and provide medical information. This would also begin a new form of Philippine TV programming, that of medical and health-related programs, which would inform the public on health matters and on healthy living. This concept helped BBC-2 launch its medical affairs TV program in the early 1980s.

=== Restoration and expansion (1986–2007) ===
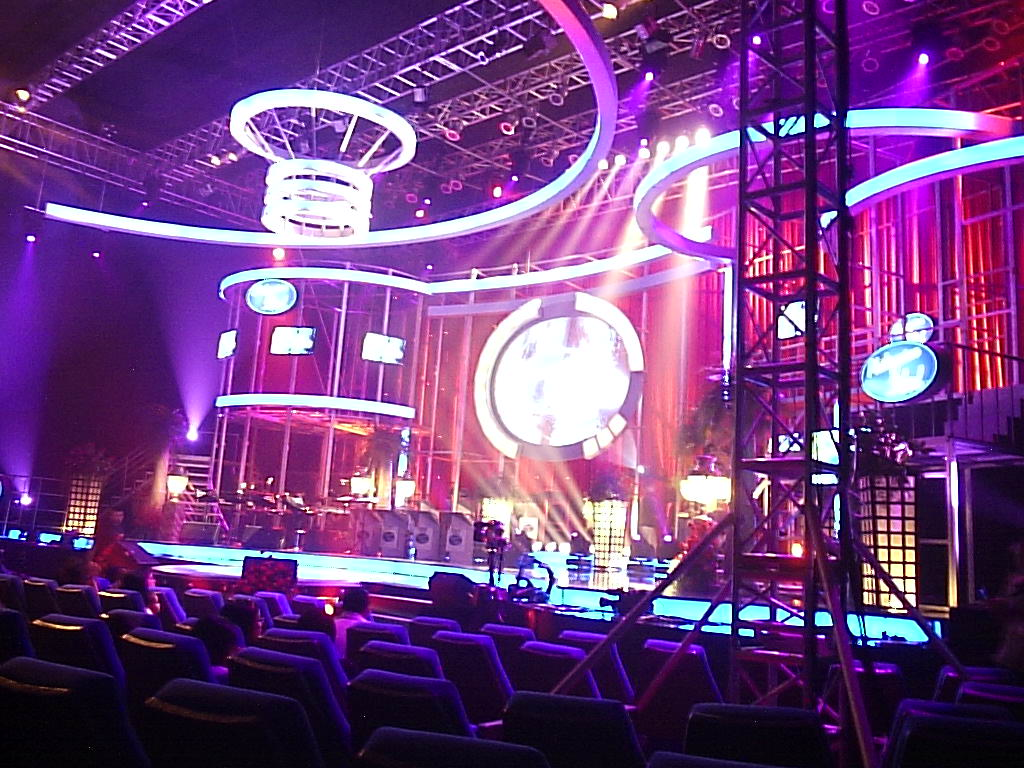
Philippine Idol

Following the 1986 People Power Revolution, which ended the dictatorship of Ferdinand Marcos, television networks previously controlled by Roberto Benedicto—BBC, RPN, and IBC—were taken over by the government through the Philippine Commission on Good Government (PCGG). BBC was returned to ABS-CBN by executive order, while RPN and IBC were placed under the Government Communications Group.

ABS-CBN began satellite and international broadcasting in 1989, becoming the first Philippine television network to broadcast internationally. By the late 1980s, it had overtaken its competitors in ratings and became the country's leading network from 1988 onward. During the same period, RPN and IBC experienced financial and management problems that led to declining viewership. GMA Network, which retained its original owners, remained a major competitor but ended the decade as the second-ranked network.

Despite financial difficulties, RPN became the first Philippine television station to broadcast 24 hours a day in 1990. By then, ABS-CBN had established a significant lead over GMA, RPN, and IBC.

On February 24, 1986, during the third day of the EDSA Revolution, the government-run station MBS was taken over by supporters of President Corazon Aquino and renamed New TV-4. It was officially renamed the People's Television Network (PTV) in April 1986, rebranded as the National Broadcasting Network (NBN) in 2001, and reverted to PTV in 2011. The network has operated from studios on Visayas Avenue since 1992.

ABC resumed broadcasting on February 21, 1992, and was rebranded as TV5 on August 9, 2008. In the 1990s, IBC became a fully government-owned station under a compromise agreement between the PCGG and Benedicto, with management and marketing returned to the IBC Board of Directors.

ZOE TV was launched on Channel 11 in 1998. The channel was block-timed by GMA Network in 2005—meaning GMA leased airtime and supplied its programming—and was relaunched as QTV later that year. It was relaunched as GMA News TV in February 2011 and, in 2020, was block-timed by ABS-CBN and relaunched as A2Z in October.

From the mid-1990s through the 2000s, numerous UHF stations were launched, including SBN 21, Studio 23, Net 25, Citynet 27, RJTV 29, CTV 31, UNTV 37, and NBC 41.

During this period, Philippine television programs began reaching international audiences. Eat Bulaga! became the first Philippine variety show to be franchised abroad, beginning with Eat Bulaga! Indonesia.

Cable television ceased to be a state responsibility in 1988, in line with the 1987 Constitution and Aquino administration policies. This shift led to the growth of private cable operators, including Sky Cable, established in 1990. In 2001, Dream Satellite TV began operating as the country's first direct-broadcast satellite television service and continued until 2017.

=== Shift to digital (2007–present) ===
Broadcast towers around Mount Busay, Cebu City

On November 3, 2006, the National Telecommunications Commission (NTC) circulated a document titled "Explanatory memorandum and draft memorandum circular for digital terrestrial television (DTT) broadcast service".

In 2007, ABS-CBN Corporation applied for a license from the commission to operate a DTT service. In August of that same year, the media company began to use the ABS-CBN Corporation name to reflect its diversification with ABS-CBN Broadcasting Corporation is still used on some uses as such both names are now alternatively used since then.

In 2008, Sky Cable became the first cable network to adopt digital television, and Cignal, the country's first digital direct-broadcast satellite television service, made its debut in February 2009.

In 2009, ABS-CBN started to test digital transmission using the European DVB-T standard. On July 11, 2009, ABS-CBN launched Balls HD in Sky Cable, the first-ever high-definition television channel in the country. On the same day, Balls also showed the live broadcast of the first-ever locally produced coverage of an event in high definition.

In June 2010, the NTC announced that the country would formally adopt the ISDB-Tb standard for digital terrestrial television and thus government-controlled television stations in Manila started to test digital transmission using the Brazilian ISDB-Tb standard. In 2011, ABS-CBN started to test ISDB-Tb transmission and released a trial version of its set-top boxes manufactured by American communications equipment supplier Atlanta DTH, Inc. GMA Network, TV5, and other commercial television networks also started their tests during this time. However, GMA Network opposed the decision made by NTC and asked NTC to reconsider the European DVB-T for its superior quality.

The country formally adopted Japan's ISDB-T standard as the official digital terrestrial television system for the Philippines., owing to its supposed better reliability and emergency broadcast feature (specifically "the ability to turn on television sets to broadcast a warning even if the television set is turned off") even during and as illustrated in calamities such as the Fukushima incident in Japan.

On February 11, 2015, ABS-CBN Corporation formally launched its ABS-CBN TV Plus service to the public during a ceremony in Quezon City. On October 3, 2015, ABS-CBN became the first national Philippine television network to broadcast in high definition on cable.

On May 25, 2018, Solar Entertainment Corporation released a DTV product called Easy TV (Philippines). Originally a mobile TV dongle service, it later distributed digital set-top boxes, as well as freemium digital TV channels, until its discontinuation on September 30, 2019.

On July 30, 2018, ABS-CBN TVplus conducted a free trial of the new set of freemium channels using UHF Channel 16 (485.143 MHz). It includes cable channels from sister company Creative Programs: O Shopping (also aired as overnight programming for ABS-CBN), Jeepney TV, and Myx (which previously had a complimentary channel, Myx2, before TVplus launched in 2015). Also included in the lineup are two new exclusive digital channels, Asianovela Channel and Movie Central. Initially, the five new channels will be beamed from Metro Manila, Metro Cebu, and Cagayan de Oro, with plans to extend their coverage to existing ABS-CBN DTV stations.

On June 1, 2019, ABS-CBN launched a digital TV dongle called ABS-CBN TVplus Go for Android smartphones. It was originally available in Metro Manila, Cavite, Laguna, Rizal, Bulacan, Pampanga, Benguet, Tarlac, Pangasinan, Nueva Ecija, Batangas, Iloilo, Bacolod, Metro Cebu, Cagayan de Oro, and Metro Davao.

On May 5, 2020, ABS-CBN TVplus was affected by the cease-and-desist order (CDO) issued by the National Telecommunications Commission (NTC) and Solicitor General Jose Calida due to the expiration of ABS-CBN's franchise. ABS-CBN's main channel and S+A ceased broadcasting, as well as the regional digital stations operated by ABS-CBN. Some TVplus channels resumed broadcasting on May 8, but in a limited coverage (Metro Manila, Laguna province, Iloilo province, and selected areas of Baguio) through a blocktime agreement with an unnamed third-party broadcast company. On June 1, 2020, Jeepney TV and Asianovela Channel resumed broadcasting and took over the channel spaces of ABS-CBN and S+A, respectively.

On June 26, 2020, GMA Network launched its digital set-top box service, GMA Affordabox, to the public.

On June 30, 2020, all the digital channels of ABS-CBN TVplus stopped operations due to the alias cease-and-desist order (ACDO) issued by the National Telecommunications Commission until it was resumed in 2021 as Digital TV Receiver.

On September 10, 2021, TV5 Network Inc. launched its digital set-top box service, Sulit TV, to the public.

The transition to digital terrestrial television (DTT) using ISDB-T International has progressed unevenly. UNTV (DWAO-DTV Channel 37 analog) fully ceased analog transmissions nationwide on January 1, 2025, marking one of the largest networks to complete the analog switch-off.

In November 2025, the National Telecommunications Commission (NTC) issued guidelines mandating the shutdown of analog TV services in Mega Manila within 12 months, targeting completion by November 2026 (effective from November 21, 2025, after a 15-day period post-publication). This revises earlier plans for a 2025 shutdown, with the rest of the country to follow thereafter. Broadcasters are preparing accordingly, with household digital adoption estimated at 80–83% in key areas like Mega Manila by late 2025.

== Programs ==
=== Weekdays ===
While TV programs vary from station to station, some generalizations can be made. Most commercial television stations sign on between the hours of 4:00 a.m. and 6:00 a.m. every morning. Morning hours are dominated by breakfast and news programs, and these run from around 8:00 to 8:30 a.m. They are then followed by acquired cartoon or anime programming that targets children, and later programs movie blocks which air blockbuster films, whether foreign or Filipino-made films. Some television stations air morning talk shows. For example, GMA airs a mid-morning variety noontime show at 11:00 a.m., while TV5 airs mid-morning teleseryes at 11:15 a.m. from June 10, 2024, to April 11, 2025. These run until noon, when the noontime shows start. These shows also air on the channel frequencies that were formerly used by ABS-CBN. These run until 2:30 p.m., followed by afternoon teleseryes or movie blocks in some TV stations.

GMA starts airing regional newscasts at 5:10 p.m. for around 30 minutes. After these regional newscasts, most stations air either an afternoon game/variety show or Korean dramas. At 6:00 p.m. and/or 4:00 p.m., flagship newscasts like Ulat Bayan, TV Patrol, 24 Oras, Tutok 13, and Frontline Pilipinas start airing to deliver the latest updates for up to 90 minutes. They formerly only ran up to 60 minutes. These newscasts run until 8:00 p.m.

After the updates, GMA starts airing primetime teleseryes that run until 10:20 p.m. with delayed telecasts on GTV weeknights from 9:40 p.m. to 11:05 p.m. and 11:25 p.m. to 12:10 a.m. on Monday-Thursday and 9:35 p.m. on Friday. On the other hand, Kapamilya Channel/A2Z/All TV runs these teleseryes until 9:30 p.m. with delayed telecast from 10:15 p.m. to 12 a.m. on Jeepney TV weeknights. TV5 starts airing their teleseryes from 8:00 p.m. until 10:30 p.m., with delayed telecast on Sari-Sari Channel weeknights at 9:00 p.m. to 10:00 p.m.

Around 10:45 p.m., 11 p.m., or 11:30 p.m., they start to air late-night newscasts, which air for 30 to 45 minutes. Formerly, they aired weekly current/public affairs programs after late-night newscasts, but now these only air during weekends; they were replaced by K-dramas or religious programs. During the 2000s to 2010s, they aired late-night programs like Walang Tulugan with the Master Showman, The Medyo Late Night Show with Jojo A., Games Uplate Live, Music Uplate Live, and O Shopping. These programs ran from around 12:00 a.m. to 2:00 a.m.

Formerly, stations also aired weekly primetime programs, whether they be comedy, drama, or horror. These also included foreign series, cartoons, and anime. The programs used to air between 7:00 p.m. and 11:00 p.m., but usage was stopped sometime between August 28, 2006, for ABS-CBN and January 3, 2008, for GMA due to competition for higher ratings in primetime. Ok Fine ‘To Ang Gusto Nyo was the last weekly primetime program to air on ABS-CBN, which aired until August 21, 2006, while the first incarnation of Magpakailanman ended on December 27, 2007. Bubble Gang was the last weekly primetime program to air until moving to Sunday on July 9, 2023. From the 1990s to 2001, they also used to air weekly foreign cartoons and anime targeted to children 12 years old and below in their evening timeslots. These shows included the likes of Pokémon, The Simpsons, Dragon Ball, The Real Ghostbusters, Teenage Mutant Ninja Turtles, Batman: The Animated Series, Beast Wars: Transformers, and Digimon.

=== Weekends ===
Weekend programming differs from weekday programming. Depending on the network, the stations start signing on from around 5:00 a.m. to 6:00 a.m. They air medical programs at 6:00 a.m., like Pinoy M.D. on GMA at 6:30 a.m., Health @ Home on PTV at 7:00 a.m., and Dok True Ba? on IBC at 8:00 a.m. on Saturdays and air Sunday Mass on Sundays. Around 7:00 a.m., they air educational programs targeting children. Later, they start airing cartoons or anime that also target children. After that, the stations air movie blocks from around 11:25 a.m. (for Eat Bulaga! on TV5 and RPTV) or 12:00 p.m. (for It's Showtime on Kapamilya Channel, A2Z, All TV, and GMA) (every Saturday) and 12:00 p.m. (every Sunday). They start to air noontime shows and noontime newscasts (like Sentro Balita Weekend on PTV). On Sunday, they air musical variety shows reserved specifically for the day.

After airing noontime shows, they air either a movie block or an original series. These include Sunday Blockbusters on Kapamilya Channel, A2Z, and All TV at 2:15 p.m., Cine Cinco Astig Sunday on TV5 and RPTV at 3:15 p.m., FPJ sa GMA on GMA also at 3:15 p.m., Sine Date Weekends at 12:00 p.m., and Afternoon Movie Break at 2:00 p.m. on GTV.

During the afternoon, they air current/public affairs programs and switch to weekend newscasts that formerly aired around midnight. These include TV Patrol Weekend on Kapamilya Channel, A2Z, All TV, ANC, DZMM TeleRadyo and PRTV Prime Media; Ulat Bayan Weekend on PTV, Frontline Pilipinas Weekend on TV5; One PH and RPTV (sometimes as a delayed telecast); and 24 Oras Weekend on GMA and GTV. Comedy programs are aired around 6:00 p.m. By 7:00 p.m., reality programs and sometimes acquired game shows are aired.

By 8:00 p.m. or 9:00 p.m., they start to air anthology programs on Saturdays and public service programs (like Kapatid Mo, Idol Raffy Tulfo on TV5 at 6:00 p.m. and One PH at 8:00 p.m.) and news magazine-type programs (like Kapuso Mo, Jessica Soho on GMA at 8:15 p.m. and GTV at 9:25 p.m. or Rated Korina on Kapamilya Channel, A2Z, and All TV at 8:15 p.m.) on Sundays. Current/public affairs programs start to air around 10:00 p.m. until midnight.

=== Drama ===
Teleseryes are a staple and popular genre on Philippine television, typically broadcast on weekdays. All television networks in the Philippines produce a variety of drama series, including genres such as romance, comedy, horror, and fantasy.

=== Fantaserye and telefantasya ===
Fantaserye and telefantasya are genres of Philippine television programming that blend elements of soap opera, telenovela, fantasy, myth, magic, and enchantment. The episodes are typically 30 minutes long and are broadcast daily during the evening primetime slot. Popular fantaseryes include Marina, while notable telefantasyas include Encantadia.

=== Sitcoms ===
Sitcoms are popular on Philippine television, typically aired on weekends, although they were formerly broadcast on weeknights. Notable sitcoms include Palibhasa Lalake (ABS-CBN's first sitcom after its re-opening in 1986), Pepito Manaloto (GMA's longest-running sitcom), Iskul Bukol (IBC's longest-running sitcom), O, Mare Ko (QTV's first sitcom after its launch in 2005), and Everybody Hapi (TV5's first sitcom after its rebrand).

=== Variety shows ===
Since 1958, network television programs in the Philippines have featured variety shows as staples at the midday hour. The popularity of bodabil (vaudeville) in the first half of the 20th century had an impact on the earliest noontime variety television shows in the Philippines. Since then, the format has changed to reflect the times, adding aspects of reality television in the 2000s. The majority of noontime variety shows on television are independently produced by blocktimers, who pay television networks a certain length of time to screen their show. However, a few TV networks have succeeded in producing only these kinds of shows, with varying degrees of success in terms of viewership and ad income.

Most of the variety shows air around the noontime slot. Willing Willie was the first variety show that aired in primetime, airing against TV Patrol of ABS-CBN and 24 Oras of GMA. It was a variety show that aired in primetime after the main host Willie Revillame left ABS-CBN, ending the second iteration of Wowowee and beginning the show's short-run third and final run without Revillame from May 5, 2010, which led to its overall end on July 30, 2010.

== Free-to-air television networks ==
=== Major television networks ===
- ABS-CBN Corporation
  - A2Z: On October 6, 2020, ABS-CBN entered a blocktime agreement with ZOE Broadcasting Network that rebranded ZOE TV into A2Z on October 10. Both media networks entered into an airtime lease on May 30, 2022. The channel was available in Metro Manila and nearby provinces and from other cable and satellite providers, including ABS-CBN's Sky Cable. The channel's programming included some of the ABS-CBN programs and movies, and its other sister television networks, as well as feature content from ZOE TV's sister station Light TV and its content partners CBN Asia and Trinity Broadcasting Network.
  - All TV is a TV station owned and operated by the Advanced Media Broadcasting System of businessman and former senator Manny Villar. Its broadcast facilities and studios are located at the Starmalls EDSA Complex, EDSA corner Shaw Boulevard, Mandaluyong City. Since April 15, 2024, All TV began carrying Kapamilya Channel broadcast feed through an agreement between AMBS and ABS-CBN and extended its airtime two years later on January 2, 2026, replacing its Jeepney TV programming block.
- GMA Network
  - GMA Network launched on October 29, 1961, by American journalist Robert Stewart under the name Republic Broadcasting System (RBS), which was the fourth television station launched in the Philippines. The network was shut down on September 23, 1972, due to martial law, but returned in December of the same year after it was allowed by the government. In 1974, RBS changed its name to GMA Radio-Television Arts after the takeover by the new management, by the triumvirate composed of Gilberto Duavit Sr., Menardo Jimenez, and Felipe Gozon. It eventually became one of the top stations in the country. The network was rebranded as GMA Rainbow Satellite Network in 1992 before it adopted its current name, GMA Network, in 1995.
  - GTV is a Philippine free-to-air television network owned and operated by Citynet Network Marketing and Productions Inc. It was launched on February 22, 2021, replacing GMA News TV on its flagship station, UHF Channel 27 in Metro Manila, and its provincial relay stations.
- TV5 Network (MediaQuest Holdings)
  - TV5 Network was launched in July 1962 by Chino Roces of The Manila Times as ABC. It was the seventh television station launched in the Philippines. On September 23, 1972, ABC 5 was one of the networks forcefully shut down by then-President Ferdinand Marcos due to the implementation of martial law. On February 21, 1992, ABC returned to television and became the fastest-growing network. On August 9, 2008, the network was relaunched as TV5. The network is currently owned by PLDT's media arm, MediaQuest Holdings.
  - RPTV is a Philippine free-to-air television channel jointly owned and operated by TV5 Network, Inc. (through its parent company MediaQuest Holdings, Inc., the media arm of PLDT Beneficial Trust Fund) and Nine Media Corporation, through an airtime lease agreement with Radio Philippines Network (RPN). Launched on February 1, 2024, on RPN VHF Channel 9 Manila, replacing CNN Philippines.

=== Government-owned television networks ===
- Intercontinental Broadcasting Corporation (IBC) (100% majority share) is a Philippine-based media company and VHF television network of the Government Communications Group under the Presidential Communications Office (PCO). IBC, along with sister stations Radio Philippines Network and sister media companies People's Television Network and Philippine Broadcasting Service, forms the media arm of the PCO. Its studios, offices, and broadcast facilities are located at the IBC Compound, Lot 3-B, Capitol Hills Drive, cor. Zuzuarregui Street, Barangay Matandang Balara, Diliman, Quezon City.
- People's Television Network (PTV) is the flagship state broadcaster owned by the Government of the Philippines. Founded on February 2, 1974, by Lito Gorospe and Francisco Tatad, PTV is the main brand of People's Television Network, Inc. (PTNI), one of the attached agencies under the Presidential Communications Office (PCO). PTV, along with sister media companies Radio Philippines Network (minority-owned) and Intercontinental Broadcasting Corporation (majority-owned), and radio network Philippine Broadcasting Service form the media arm of the PCO. Its head office, studios, and transmitter are located at Broadcast Complex, Visayas Avenue, Barangay Vasra, Diliman, Quezon City.
- Radio Philippines Network (RPN) (20% minority share (after ending 100% majority share in 2011); currently carries RPTV) is a Filipino-based media company based in Quezon City. It is currently owned through a majority share by Nine Media Corporation of the ALC Group of Companies, along with the Government Communications Group under the Presidential Communications Office (PCO) and Far East Managers and Investors Inc., owned by the family of company founder Roberto Benedicto under the name Kanlaon Broadcasting System (KBS), among others as major shareholders. RPN, along with sister stations Intercontinental Broadcasting Corporation and sister media companies People's Television Network and Philippine Broadcasting Service, forms the media arm of the PCO. The network's main offices and transmitter are located at the RPN Compound, Panay Avenue, Brgy. South Triangle, Diliman, also in Quezon City.

=== Minor television networks ===
- Aliw Channel 23 is a Philippine television network owned and operated by Aliw Broadcasting Corporation. The network broadcasts on UHF Channel 23 via digital terrestrial television in Metro Manila.
- BEAM TV is a telecommunications company in the Philippines with a primary focus on UHF broadcasting and digital terrestrial television for the convergence of multimedia. It is owned by Bethlehem Holdings, Inc., a media investment company of Globe Telecom through its Retirement Fund group.
- Net 25 is a television network owned and operated by Eagle Broadcasting Corporation (EBC). EBC is owned by the key members of the independent Christian church, the Iglesia ni Cristo. The network is named for its flagship station in Metro Manila, DZEC-DTV, which is carried on UHF channel 28 on digital terrestrial TV and is carried by major cable operators in the country. The station's broadcast facilities are located at EBC Building #25, Central Ave., Barangay Culiat, New Era, Quezon City.
- RJTV is a Philippine television and radio network owned by guitarist-singer-businessman Ramon "RJ" Jacinto. The network's studio headquarters is located at Ventures I Bldg., Makati Ave. cor. Gen. Luna St., Makati.
- Southern Broadcasting Network (SBN) (currently carries SolarFlix) is a Filipino-owned media company with a radio and television network based in Metro Manila. SBN is a subsidiary of Solar Entertainment Corporation, a Filipino-owned television company managed by the Tieng family.
- UNTV is the flagship television network of the Progressive Broadcasting Corporation (known on air as UNTV-PBC). Together with Breakthrough and Milestones Productions International (known on air as UNTV-BMPI), the network's content provider and marketing arm, and Christian religious organization Members Church of God International (MCGI), its major blocktimer. DWAO-DTV is one of the very few NTSC-System M stations in the world that broadcast on ultra-high frequency (UHF) Channel 37. In 2019, UNTV transferred its studios from the old UNTV Building at 907 EDSA, Quezon City, to La Verdad Christian College (LVCC) Caloocan Building, 351 EDSA, Brgy. Bagong Barrio West, Caloocan. The UNTV transmitter is located at Emerald Hills, Sumulong Highway in Antipolo, Rizal. The 16-story UNTV Broadcast Center, also referred to as The Millennial Tower and now called The Philippine Broadcast Hub along EDSA-Philam, is currently under construction to serve as its new headquarters.

=== Japanese language channels (proposed) ===
- Kapamilya Japanese (from Nippon TV)
- GMA 2 Japanese (from TBS Television)
- TV5 Japanese (from Fuji TV)
- PTV 2 Japanese (from NHK)
- RPN 2 Japanese (from TV Asahi)
- IBC 2 Japanese (from TV Tokyo)

=== Specialty channels ===
- ABS-CBN News Channel
- Bilyonaryo News Channel
- Cine Mo!
- Cinema One
- Congress TV
- D8TV
- DepEd TV
- DWAN TV
- DWIZ News TV
- DZMM TeleRadyo is a Philippine pay television channel owned by Media Serbisyo Production Corporation, a joint venture between Prime Media Holdings (through subsidiary Philippine Collective Media Corporation) and ABS-CBN Corporation, with ABS-CBN News as its main content provider. It was launched on June 30, 2023, as TeleRadyo Serbisyo, coinciding with DWPM Radyo 630 (now DZMM Radyo Patrol 630) under the joint venture of Prime Media and ABS-CBN. On May 29, 2025, the channel discontinued the TeleRadyo Serbisyo branding after finishing the TV Patrol simulcast and returned to being DZMM TeleRadyo at the same time with its radio counterpart at 8:00 p.m., bringing back the iconic brand after 5 years of inactivity.
- DZRH News Television
- E-Novation TV
- Golden Nation Network
- Heart of Asia Channel, known on-air as Heart of Asia, is a Philippine free-to-air television channel owned by GMA Network Inc. The channel was on test broadcast from June 12–28, 2020, and was officially launched on June 29, 2020.
- I Heart Movies is a Philippine free-to-air television channel owned by GMA Network Inc. The channel was on test broadcast from March 22, 2021, until March 31, 2021, and was officially launched on April 5, 2021.
- Jeepney TV
- Kapamilya Channel is a 24-hour pay television channel replacing the former ABS-CBN terrestrial network, launching on June 13, 2020. It is owned and operated by ABS-CBN Corporation, a subsidiary of the Lopez Holdings Corporation.
- Knowledge Channel
- Metro Channel
- MYX
- One PH
- One Sports is a television station of TV5 Network Inc. with Nation Broadcasting Corporation (NBC) as its primary content provider and was launched on March 8, 2020. One Sports serves as a sports channel for The 5 Network, with its programs primarily produced by its sports division of the same name. It was formerly called 5 Plus when it was launched on January 13, 2019, and AksyonTV, a Filipino-language news channel launched by TV5 from 2011 to 2019.
- Pinoy Xtreme
- PRTV Prime Media
- PTV Sports Network
- Radyo Bandido TV
- Radyo Pilipinas 1 TV
- RJ Rock of Manila TV
- Solar Learning (DepEd TV)
- Solar Sports
- Timeless TV

=== Religious television networks ===
- GCTV
- Hope Channel Philippines (Seventh-day Adventist Church, Gateway UHF Television Broadcasting) is a religious network of the Seventh-day Adventist Church in the Philippines. Its TV stations are owned by Gateway UHF Television Broadcasting, while its radio stations are owned by Digital Broadcasting Corporation. Founded and launched on September 26, 2010, in the South Philippines (its main service broadcast provider), and in January 2011 in Luzon and Visayas.
- INC TV (Christian Era Broadcasting Service International) is the flagship UHF television station of Christian Era Broadcasting Service International, a broadcast ministry of the independent Philippine Christian Church, the Iglesia ni Cristo. INC TV studios and transmitters are located at Redeemer Street, Milton Hills Subdivision, Brgy. New Era, Quezon City.
- Light TV (Jesus Is Lord Church) is a UHF digital television station of ZOE Broadcasting Network. DZOZ-DTV studios are located on the 22nd Floor, Strata 2000 Bldg., Emerald Ave., Ortigas Center, Pasig. Its transmitter is located at ZOE Compound Center, Crestview Heights Subdivision, Barangay San Roque, Antipolo, Rizal.
- Truth Channel (formerly known as Ang Dating Daan Television or ADDTV) is a Philippine religious television network founded in 2014 as ADDTV and then launched on September 3, 2017, as Truth Channel. It is the flagship television network of the Members Church of God International (MCGI), together with UNTV News and Rescue, the network's carrier on free-to-air digital terrestrial television (DTT). It is known for its broadcast of Itanong mo kay Soriano and Ang Dating Daan, hosted by international televangelist Bro. Eli Soriano and Kuya Daniel Razon. It broadcasts 24 hours a day on Ultra High Frequency (UHF) Channel 38 in Metro and Mega Manila, Rizal, Bulacan, Pampanga, Laguna, Cavite, and some parts of Tarlac. The Ang Dating Daan program also holds the longest-running religious program in the Philippines since 1983, when the program made its national television debut on IBC Channel 13.
- TV Maria is a national Catholic television channel broadcasting from Manila, Philippines. Owned by TV Maria Foundation Philippines (a non-profit, non-stock organization under the Catholic Bishops' Conference of the Philippines and the Roman Catholic Archdiocese of Manila), it airs 24 hours a day and is currently available on major and provincial cable operators and on digital terrestrial television broadcasts via RJ Digital TV's DTT subchannel in Mega Manila and GNN's DTT subchannels.

=== Regional television networks ===
- Bandera News TV (Palawan)
- Bee TV (Butuan)
- Brigada News TV (General Santos)
- Brodkast Southern Luzon (CALABARZON)
- CCTN (Cebu)
- CLTV (Central Luzon)
- Davao Christian Bible Channel (Davao)
- eMedia TV (Zamboanga)
- GBPI (Zamboanga)
- Infomax TV (Pampanga)
- Jao TV (Cagayan de Oro)
- PBC (Palawan)
- PRTV (Tacloban)
- Ranao TV (Marawi)
- Tirad Pass Network (Candon)
- TV48 (Nueva Ecija)
- UBC Global Media Ministries Incorporated (Pampanga)

=== Defunct/Inactive television network(s) ===
- 2nd Avenue
- 3ABN
- 5 Plus
- 9TV
- ABC 47
- ABS-CBN: Before its shutdown, ABS-CBN was the first, oldest, and largest television network in the country, and it is owned and controlled by the Lopez Group of Companies. The network was launched on October 23, 1953, as Alto Broadcasting System (ABS) on DZAQ-TV Channel 3 by Antonio Quirino and James Lindenberg. ABS was soon acquired by the owner of Chronicle Broadcasting Network (CBN), Don Eugenio Lopez Sr., on February 24, 1957, with CBN launching its TV station on DZXL-TV Channel 9 a year later. In 1961, ABS and CBN merged to form ABS-CBN and became the Philippines' largest network. On May 5, 2020, the network was ordered to stop broadcasting by the National Telecommunications Commission after its franchise expired. On July 10, 2020, the Philippine Congress rejected its franchise renewal due to alleged violations in its franchise and other legal issues, such as failure to regularize employees, using pay-per-view channels in the free-to-air franchise, and alleged political meddling and bias during the 2016 elections. Before this, President Rodrigo Duterte himself accused ABS-CBN of allegedly being biased against his administration and vowed to block the renewal of its franchise. Critics of his administration, human rights groups, and several media unions said that the shutdown of ABS-CBN is an attack on press freedom and democracy in the country. The network operations were also stopped by then-President Ferdinand Marcos on September 23, 1972, when he declared martial law until its return on the airwaves on September 14, 1986 (a few months after the ousting of Marcos during the People Power Revolution).
- ABS-CBN Regional Channel
- AksyonTV
- AKTV
- Aniplus Asia
- Asianovela Channel
- ATC @ IBC
- BBC/City2
- Balls
- BTV
- Blast Sports
- Boo
- BuKo
- C/S
- C/S 9
- Catsup
- CgeTV
- Channel V Philippines
- Chase
- Citynet Television
- CNBC Asia
- CNN Philippines was a free-to-air, commercial broadcast, cable, and satellite television network in the Philippines. It is owned and operated by Nine Media Corporation, together with Radio Philippines Network (RPN) as the main content provider, under license from Warner Bros. Discovery: CNN Philippines was launched on March 16, 2015. CNN Philippines is the fifth local franchise of CNN in Asia, after CNN Indonesia, CNN Türk, CNN Arabic, and CNN-IBN (now CNN-News18 in India).
- CT
- CTV 31
- Daystar TV
- DBS 35
- E! Philippines
- eGG Network
- Entertainment Music Channel
- ETC
- ETV 39
- EZ Shop
- Fox Filipino
- FUBC
- GEM TV
- Global News Network
- GMA News TV (GNTV)
- Gone Viral TV
- GMA Hallypop
- Hero
- Hope Channel International
- Inquirer 990 Television
- Intervision 68
- Island Living Channel
- Jack City
- Jack TV
- K Movies Pinoy
- K-Plus
- KBO
- Kermit Channel
- Life TV
- Liga
- Living Asia Channel
- Maxxx
- MBC 11
- MBN 43
- MMDA TV
- Movie Central
- MTV (Philippines, 1992-2010)
- MTV (Philippines, 2014-2017)
- MTV (Philippines, 2017-2019)
- My Movie Channel
- NBA Premium TV
- O Shopping
- One Media Network
- Oras ng Himala Channel
- Outdoor Channel
- PBN (Bicol)
- PCO TV
- PIE Channel 31
- Pilipinas HD
- Pinoy Hits was a Filipino digital television channel owned by GMA Network Inc. The channel conducted a test broadcast on January 2, 2023, and officially launched on January 16.
- PinoyHowTo
- Pop Life TV
- QTV/Q
- RBU 38 (Pampanga)
- RMN TV was a television station owned and operated by Radio Mindanao Network in Cagayan de Oro. Its studios and transmitter were located at RMN Broadcast Center (Canoy Bldg.), Don Apolinario Velez St., Cagayan de Oro.
- RTVMalacañang
- ABS-CBN S+A Channel 23 (DWAC) was a free-to-air television network based in Quezon City. It was owned by ABS-CBN Corporation, with some of its programs produced and licensed by ABS-CBN Sports.
- Salaam TV was a Philippine government-owned Islamic channel owned by the Presidential Communications Office through the People's Television Network (PTV). The channel's main programming is solely focused on Filipino Muslims and other Islamic communities in the Philippines.
- Sari-Sari Channel
- Shop Japan
- Shop TV
- SMNI News Channel was a news and public affairs television network based in Makati City. It is owned and operated by Swara Sug Media Corporation, the parent company of Sonshine Media Network International, a religious broadcasting arm of the Kingdom of Jesus Christ (KJC) led by Filipino televangelist and church leader pastor Apollo Quiboloy.
- SMNI
- Social TV
- Solar News Channel
- Solar TV
- ABS-CBN Studio 23
- SBC (Zambales)
- Tag
- Talk TV
- The Game Channel
- TBN Philippines
- TeleAsia
- Telenovela Channel
- True TV
- TVUP
- TV Shop Philippines
- UFC TV
- Ultravision 25
- UniversiTV
- Velvet
- Vintage Television
- Viva TV
- WilTV
- Yey!
- Zee Sine
- ZooMoo

== See also ==
- Digital terrestrial television in the Philippines
- List of analog television stations in the Philippines
- List of digital television stations in the Philippines
- Subscription television in the Philippines
- Radio in the Philippines
- Mass media in the Philippines
- List of Philippine television shows
