= Tag (TV channel) =

Defunct cable television channel in the Philippines

- Country: Philippines
- Broadcast area: Defunct
- Headquarters: ABS-CBN Broadcasting Center, Diliman, Quezon City, Philippines

Programming
- Languages: Tagalog (primary); English (secondary)
- Picture format: 480i (SDTV)

Ownership
- Owner: Creative Programs
- Sister channels: ABS-CBN News Channel, ABS-CBN Regional Channel, Asianovela Channel, Cine Mo!, Cinema One, DZMM TeleRadyo, Hero, Jeepney TV, Lifestyle, Liga, Movie Central, Myx, Yey!

History
- Launched: 19 October 2016
- Closed: 15 January 2018
- Replaced by: Liga, Movie Central; Cine Mo!

Tag (sometimes referred to as Tag TV; Tag is short for "Tagalized") was a Philippine pay television channel owned by Creative Programs, a subsidiary of media conglomerate ABS-CBN Corporation. Its programming included a line-up of Asian and Hollywood movies dubbed in Tagalog, including all the films shown on ABS-CBN's Kapamilya Blockbusters, S+A's Action Movie Zone, Cine Mo!'s Cine Pow and selected Asian movies, Yey! channel's KidSine, and Cinema One's foreign film spotlight on Blockbuster Sundays movie blocks.

On January 10, 2018, Creative Programs announced that Tag would cease its broadcast on January 15, 2018, alongside ABS-CBN Regional Channel.
