= Balls (TV channel) =

Defunct sports cable TV channel in the Philippines

- Country: Philippines
- Broadcast area: Defunct
- Headquarters: ABS-CBN Broadcasting Center, Diliman, Quezon City, Philippines

Programming
- Languages: English (primary); Filipino (secondary)
- Picture format: 1080i HDTV (downscaled to 16:9 480i for the SDTV feed)

Ownership
- Owner: ABS-CBN Corporation
- Sister channels: ABS-CBN; ANC; CgeTV; Cinema One; Cine Mo! DZMM TeleRadyo; Hero; Jeepney TV; Knowledge Channel; Lifestyle; Liga; Maxxx; Myx; O Shopping; S+A; Velvet; Studio 23

History
- Launched: January 1, 2008
- Closed: December 31, 2015 (7 years, 11 months and 30 days)
- Replaced by: ABS-CBN Sports+Action HD; Liga

Links
- Website: Archived official website at the Wayback Machine (archived 2015-12-31)

Balls was a Philippine pay television network based in Quezon City. It was notable for being the country's first local high-definition TV channel. It was owned and operated by ABS-CBN's subsidiary ABS-CBN Cable Channels. The network shows notable sports broadcasts from the Philippines and abroad, as well as other sports related programming. Its local programming were produced and licensed by ABS-CBN Sports.

== Background ==
Balls was officially launched on January 1, 2008, the same day that fellow ABS-CBN subsidiary Sky Cable dropped the channels of Solar Entertainment Corporation (including the sports channels Solar Sports and Basketball TV) from its lineup. These channels were replaced by a group of new channels owned by ABS-CBN's subsidiary Creative Programs Inc. (now ABS-CBN Cable Channels), which include Maxxx and Velvet. While SkyCable officials stated that the channels were being replaced to reduce redundancy in SkyCable's lineup and introduce new programming to the service, reports surfaced that the two companies had failed to reach a carriage deal since ABS-CBN had accused Solar of cannibalizing the revenue of its over-the-air networks. Some reports says that the dispute has to do with Manny Pacquiao's exclusive contract with ABS-CBN's main competitor GMA Network, which Solar has partnered for free TV airing of its boxing matches.

Although Balls was intended to effectively replace it, Basketball TV was restored to the SkyCable lineup in time for the 2008–09 NBA season in October 2008, and other Solar channels also returned to the lineup afterward.

It was announced that Balls and Balls HD would cease their broadcast on December 31, 2015. Its HD channel, as well as the entire channel's content (except the Ultimate Fighting Championship (UFC) which the broadcast rights was acquired by TV5's sports division, Sports5) was absorbed to the Sports + Action brand and renamed as ABS-CBN Sports + Action HD.

The last program to air on this channel was a replay of UFC 194: Aldo vs. McGregor on December 31, 2015, before signing off at 12:00 MN on January 1, 2016. Cable providers still receiving Balls would see an imaging card that reads "Balls is now signing off", until the provider can replace it with another channel, while other providers like Sky Cable (in Metro Manila and in select metropolitan and large cities) have replaced this channel with a reserved channel or with another channel, with Sky Cable replacing it with ABS-CBN Sports + Action.

== High-definition feed ==
On July 11, 2009, the channel launched its own high-definition feed on Sky Cable, marking the Philippines' first ever local high-definition television channel. On the same day, Balls also televised the country's first locally produced programs in HD, which included a UAAP college basketball game, followed by an NCAA game the following Monday, all produced by ABS-CBN Sports using the recently acquired Sony high-definition professional video cameras and a state-of-the-art HD OB van with technologies developed by EVS Broadcast Equipment, Snell, and Avid Technology. Balls HD was in hibernation from December 28, 2009 until 2013.

== Programming ==
Balls' initial lineup focused on ball sports such as football, basketball, golf, tennis, and volleyball (as suggested by its name). Balls also aired 2 of 4 Tennis Grand Slam Tournament which is French Open (2008–2013; transferred to Fox Sports Asia) and US Open (2007–2015). Balls later expanded its lineup to include boxing, UFC MMA events, WWE programs, and the 2011 Southeast Asian Games. It also carries all the matches of FIFA World Cup which is exclusively licensed to ABS-CBN Sports. While originally airing only foreign events since its inception, Balls began to air domestic events produced by ABS-CBN Sports in 2009, beginning with NCAA Season 85 and UAAP Season 72.
