= Creative Programs =

Philippine media company, subsidiary of ABS-CBN Corporation

- Type: Subsidiary
- Industry: Pay television
- Founded: January 1, 1995; 31 years ago
- Headquarters: ABS-CBN Broadcasting Center, Sgt. Esguerra Avenue corner Mother Ignacia Street, Diliman, Quezon City, Metro Manila, Philippines
- Area served: Philippines
- Key people: Ernie Lopez (President, ABS-CBN Creative Programs Inc.); Teresita Villareal (Officer in Charge, ABS-CBN Creative Programs Inc.)
- Products: Pay TV channels Pay-per-view
- Revenue: Php 1.8 billion (FY 2014)
- Owner: ABS-CBN Corporation
- Parent: ABS-CBN Corporation
- Subsidiaries: ABS-CBN Publishing
- Website: cablechannels.abs-cbn.com

Creative Programs, Inc. (CPI) is a subsidiary of ABS-CBN Corporation that operates and distributes pay TV channels and provides pay-per-view services to direct-to-home satellite and cable television providers in the Philippines. Since 2019, CPI also engages in book and magazine publishing through its subsidiary ABS-CBN Publishing, following their merger.

== Channel distribution ==
=== Owned and operated channels ===
- Cinema One (2001–present) – a movie channel that shows mostly Filipino films.
- Jeepney TV (2012–present) – a general entertainment channel that shows classic TV shows of ABS-CBN.
- Metro Channel/Metro Channel HD (2018–present) – a lifestyle channel targeted to women and serves as a replacement of Lifestyle.
- Myx (2002–present) – a music channel targeted to youth audience.

=== Local channels owned and operated by ABS-CBN and affiliates ===
- ABS-CBN News Channel/ANC HD (1999–present) – an English language news and business channel targeted to Filipinos.
- Cine Mo! (2011–present) - an all-day Filipino movie and entertainment channel.
- DZMM TeleRadyo (2007–2020, 2025–present) – a Filipino language news channel targeted to Filipino masses owned by Media Serbisyo Production Corporation, a joint venture between Prime Media Holdings (through subsidiary PCMC) and ABS-CBN, with ABS-CBN News as its main content providers, coinciding with the launch of its radio counterpart DZMM Radyo Patrol 630.
- Kapamilya Channel/Kapamilya Channel HD (2020–present) – a general entertainment channel that serves as a replacement of the main ABS-CBN terrestrial network which ceased its free-to-air broadcasts on May 5, 2020, after its legislative franchise renewal was denied on July 10, 2020.
- Knowledge Channel (1996–present) – an educational channel owned by ABS-CBN and Knowledge Channel Foundation, Inc.

=== International channel distribution ===
- Celestial Classic Movies
- Kix
- Thrill

=== Pay per view ===
- Sky Movies PPV
- Sky Sports PPV

=== Live streaming ===
- Kapamilya Online Live (2020–present)

=== Others ===
- Sky Freeview

=== Defunct channels ===
- ABS-CBN HD (2015–2020) – a high-definition simulcast of ABS-CBN.
- ABS-CBN Regional Channel (2016–2018) – programming produced regionally by ABS-CBN Regional stations.
- Asianovela Channel (2018–2020) – a channel that airs Filipino-Dubbed drama series and movies from South Korea, Singapore, Taiwan, Thailand, China and Japan.
- Balls (2008–2015) – a premium sports channel targeted to upscale men.
- Balls HD (2009, 2013–2015) – a high-definition feed of Balls.
- CgeTV (2010–2012) – an interactive user-generated channel.
- Classic 21 (1992–1994)
- Hero (2005–2018) – a channel that shows Tagalog-dubbed anime; now a pop culture web portal under ABS-CBN Digital Media
- I Channel (1992–1999) - a family-oriented channel that shows English-dubbed foreign animated and live-action television series.
- Lifestyle (1999–2018) – a channel targeted to upscale women.
- Liga (2018–2020; also on HD) – a sports channel that airs international football and local sporting events.
- Maxxx (2008–2010) – a channel targeted to upscale men.
- Movie Central (2018–2020) – a digital English movie channel from ABS-CBN TV Plus, now a programming block on Kapamilya Channel during overnight hours.
- O Shopping (16:9 widescreen) (2013–2020) – a shopping channel owned by ABS-CBN and CJ Group of Korea; now a shopping digital web portal under ABS-CBN Digital Media.
- PIE (2022–2023) – an interactive channel owned by ABS-CBN and BEAM TV, now online platform.
- Pinoy Blockbuster Channel (1998–2001)
- S+A HD (2016–2020) – a high-definition simulcast of S+A.
- Sarimanok Channel 37 (1996)
- Sarimanok News Channel (1996–1999)
- SineBox (2003–2011)
- Sky 1 (1994–1998)
- Sky Mall (1995–1998)
- Sky Movies (1994)
- Sky News (1995–1996)
- Tag (2016–2018) – a channel that shows Tagalog-dubbed foreign movies.
- The Sing–along Channel (1996–1997)
- TeleRadyo (2020–2023) – a Filipino language news channel targeted to Filipino masses
- TeleRadyo Serbisyo (2023–2025) – a Filipino language news channel targeted to Filipino masses owned by Media Serbisyo Production Corporation, a joint venture between Prime Media Holdings (through subsidiary PCMC) and ABS-CBN, with ABS-CBN News as its main content providers, coinciding with the launch of its radio counterpart DWPM Radyo 630.
- Velvet (2008–2014) – a channel targeted to upscale women.
- Vid-OK (1997–2002) – a music channel targeted to Filipinos.
- Yey! (2011–2020) - a digital children's channel from ABS-CBN TV Plus, now a programming block on Kapamilya Channel, Jeepney TV, AMBS' All TV and ZOE's A2Z.

=== Defunct Pay per view ===
- Cinema One Premium HD
- Kapamilya Box Office
- KBO on Sky PPV
- Super KBO
- Star Cinema PPV

=== Live streaming ===
- Pinoy Big Brother 24/7 live streaming (2005–2015)
