= Velvet (TV channel) =

Defunct cable television channel in the Philippines

- Velvet channel logo
- Country: Philippines
- Broadcast area: Defunct
- Network: ABS-CBN; Studio 23
- Headquarters: Quezon City, Philippines

Programming
- Language: English
- Picture format: 480i (SDTV)

Ownership
- Owner: Creative Programs, Inc.
- Sister channels: ANC, DZMM TeleRadyo, Cinema One, Hero, Knowledge Channel, Lifestyle, Myx, Balls, Jeepney TV, Cine Mo!, Yey!, Maxxx, CgeTV, O Shopping

History
- Launched: January 1, 2008
- Closed: January 1, 2014
- Replaced by: O Shopping (channel space)

Velvet was a Filipino cable television network based in Quezon City. It was owned and operated by Creative Programs, Inc. (now ABS-CBN Cable Channels), a wholly owned subsidiary of the media conglomerate ABS-CBN Corporation. The primary focus of the network was into women-oriented general entertainment programming.

== Channel Information ==
Velvet had a sneak preview on SkyCable channel 25 since November 2007, together with Maxxx and Balls. Velvet was officially launched on January 1, 2008. Velvet also aired selected shows on Studio 23.

The channel went off the air at the midnight on January 1, 2014. Miss Universe 2013 was the last program shown on Velvet before it permanently signed off.

Most of the channel's programming and specials were moved to Lifestyle (now Metro Channel).

== Description ==
Velvet is the result after the contract of Solar Entertainment's 2nd Avenue expired with SkyCable. Velvet is fairly similar in theme and audiences with ETC and 2nd Avenue typically appealing to the female-audience genre with a range from pre-adolescent to the late-thirties age bracket. Velvet features programs based on entertainment news & specials, game shows, stand-up comedy acts, drama, reality series and award shows.

== Final program line-up ==
=== Series ===
- 'Til Death
- 10 Things I Hate About You
- 18 to Life
- 90210 (Season 1 to 5)
- A Gifted Man
- Accidentally on Purpose
- American Princess
- All About Aubrey
- America's Next Top Model (Cycles 1 to 12)
- America's Prom Queen
- Asia's Next Top Model
- Australia's Next Top Model
- Awkward
- Bad Girls Club (Seasons 8 & 9)
- Big Day
- Big Love
- Big Rich Texas
- Biography
- Blue Bloods (Seasons 1 to 3)
- Blush: The Search for the Next Great Makeup Artist
- Born to Dance
- Bridalplasty
- Brothers & Sisters (Season 5)
- Britain's Next Top Model
- Canada's Next Top Model
- CBS Evening News
- Celebrity Apprentice (Seasons 5 to 7)
- Celebrity Fit Club
- Charmed
- Comedy Central Roast
- Cougar Town
- Crossing Jordan
- Crowned
- Dallas Divas & Daughters
- Dance Moms
- Denise Richards: It's Complicated
- Dexter (Seasons 4 & 5)
- Dirt
- Dirty Soap
- Don't Forget the Lyrics!
- Downtown Girls
- E! News Weekend
- E! True Hollywood Story
- Excused
- Extreme Close-Up
- Extreme Makeover: Home Edition
- Everybody Loves Raymond
- Fashion Police
- Five Days
- Fly Girls
- Geordie Shore
- Gigantic
- Girlfriends
- Girls Who Like Boys Who Like Boys
- Gigolos
- Glamour Belles
- Good Morning America
- Got to Dance (Seasons 1 to 4)
- Harper's Island
- Hawaii Five-0 (Seasons 1 to 3)
- Hey Paula
- High Society
- Holly's World
- Hollyscoop
- Hollywood Squares
- House of Lies (Seasons 1 to 2)
- Huff
- Huge
- I Know Kids Like a Star
- I Really Knew Me
- I Want To Be a Hilton
- I'm a Celebrity...Get Me Out of Here!
- Ice Loves Coco
- Iconoclasts
- Inside the Actors Studio
- Is She Really Going Out with Him?
- Jeopardy!
- Jersey Shore (Seasons 1 to 4)
- Judging Amy
- Keeping Up with the Kardashians (Seasons 1 to 6)
- Kell on Earth
- Kid Nation
- Kourtney and Kim Take Miami
- Kourtney and Kim Take New York
- Khloé & Lamar
- Life Unexpected
- Living Lohan
- Lost in Austen
- Louie Spence's Showbusiness
- Love You To Death
- Made in Chelsea
- Make It or Break It
- Make Me a Supermodel U. K.
- Married to Rock
- Medium
- Mel B: It's a Scarry World
- Melrose Place
- Miss Guided
- Mobbed
- Nearly Famous
- No Ordinary Party
- Nurse Jackie (Seasons 1 to 4)
- Old Skool with Terry & Gita
- On The Red Carpet
- On The Road with Austin & Santino
- Paradise Hotel
- Perfect Catch
- Pineapple Dance Studios
- Pretty Wild
- Queen Bees
- Reality Hell
- Ringer
- Running in Heels
- Running Russell Simmons
- RuPaul's Drag Race (Seasons 3, 4 & 5)
- Savannah
- Secrets of Aspen
- Shear Genius (Season 2)
- Shedding for the Wedding
- So You Think You Can Dance (Seasons 5 to 9)
- Spelling Manor Series
- Streets of Hollywood
- Style by June
- Stylista
- Summerland
- Tabatha's Salon Takeover (Season 2)
- Tell Me You Love Me
- Texas Women
- The Apprentice (Season 4 to 7)
- The Choice
- The Comeback
- The Good Wife (Seasons 1 to 4)
- The Hasselhoffs
- The Janice Dickinson Modeling Agency (Season 3)
- The Mortified Sessions
- The Next Best Thing
- The Nine Lives of Chloe King
- The Real Housewives of Beverly Hills (Seasons to 3)
- The Real Housewives of Miami (Seasons 1 & 2)
- The Sarah Silverman Program
- The Secret Lives of Dancers
- The Short List
- The Sing-Off
- The Soup
- The Soup Presents
- The Spin Crowd
- The View
- Three Rivers
- Tipping the Velvet
- Tough Love (Seasons 4 & 5)
- Unleashed by Garo
- Victoria Silvstedt: My Perfect Life
- Watch Over Me
- Wheel of Fortune
- When Women Rule the World
- Whittaker Bay
- Wife Swap
- Wildest TV Show Moments
- Will & Grace
- Work of Art: The Next Great Artist
- Worst Week

=== Movies and Entertainment Specials ===
- FlickFest Matinee
- Flick Pick
- Spotlight
- Velvet Entertainment Specials

=== Annual Events & Specials ===
- Binibining Pilipinas (2012)
- Brit Awards 2012
- Club Elite 2012
- Elite Model Look (2011)
- Guys' Choice Awards (2012)
- Miss Universe (2008–2013)
- Oscars (2008–2013)
- Primetime Emmy Awards (2008–2013)
- Screen Actors Guild Awards (2011)
- Teen Choice Awards (2011–2012)
- The Comedy Awards (2011–2013)
- The Royal Variety Performance 2011
- Tony Awards (2008–2009; 2012–2013)
- Victoria's Secret Fashion Show (2010–2012)
