= Maxxx =

Defunct entertainment television channel in the Philippines

- Maxxx logo
- Country: Philippines
- Broadcast area: Defunct
- Network: ABS-CBN; Studio 23
- Headquarters: Quezon City, Philippines

Programming
- Picture format: 480i (SDTV)

Ownership
- Owner: ABS-CBN Corporation (Creative Programs, Inc.)
- Sister channels: ABS-CBN News Channel; DZMM TeleRadyo; Cinema One; Hero (now on web portal); Kapamilya Channel (now S+A International); Knowledge Channel; Lifestyle (now Metro Channel); Velvet (now defunct); Myx; Balls (now Liga); Studio 23 (now S+A); The Filipino Channel

History
- Launched: January 1, 2008
- Closed: September 30, 2010

Links
- Website: maxxxchannel.multiply.com

Maxxx was a general entertainment channel for men owned by Creative Programs, Inc., an ABS-CBN Corporation subsidiary. It eventually shutdown due to lack of ratings of the channel.

== Channel Information ==
Maxxx had a test broadcast together with Velvet and Balls (both defunct) since September 2007. Maxxx had an official launch on January 1, 2008. Maxxx has also aired selected shows over UHF channel Studio 23. Maxxx ceased airing on September 30, 2010. Its channel space was replaced by Solar's Jack TV.

== Description ==
Maxxx is the answer of SkyCable after the expiration of the contract of Solar Entertainment's Jack TV. Maxxx is fairly similar in themes and audience with Jack TV typically the male-audience ranging from teens to men. Maxxx features shows based on poker, racing, comedy, adult-themed shows and cartoons and all-time classic old TV series such as Star Trek, Flash Gordon, Lucky Louie and Scrubs.

== Shows ==
- 48 Hours
- American Inventor
- Attack of the Show
- Ballbreakers
- Behind the Music that Sucks
- Bikini Destinations
- Bikini Life Adventures
- Boston Legal
- Breaking Bad
- Build or Bust
- Bullrun
- CSI: NY
- Camouflage
- Cheat!
- Cheaters
- Cinematech
- Cinematech: Nocturnal Emissions
- Combat!
- Crash Test Dummies
- Creature Comforts
- Destination X
- Dexter
- D. E. A.
- Extras
- Exposed
- Fear Factor
- Fear Itself
- Filipino Poker Tour
- Flight of the Conchords
- Flash Gordon
- Frasier
- Freestyle Moto X
- Friday Night Project
- Friday the 13th: The Series
- From the Earth to the Moon
- God, the Devil and Bob
- Ghost Hunters International
- Highlander: The Series
- Hey Joel
- Hot n' Heavy
- How Does That Work?
- IHRA Nitro Jam Series
- International Fight League
- JPod
- John from Cincinnati
- Just Kidding
- Keys to the VIP
- Kingdom Hospital
- Lewis Black's Root of All Evil
- Late Show with David Letterman
- Lucky Louie
- Men 7 Show
- Mission: Impossible
- Missing
- Mondo Mini Shows
- Modern Toss
- Most Daring
- Most Shocking
- Murder
- NCIS
- Nowhere Man
- Nightmare Ned
- Numbers
- Odd Job Jack
- Penn & Teller: Bullshit!
- Pinks All Out
- Planet Rock Profiles
- Pros vs. Joes
- Ralph TV
- ReGenesis
- Rome
- Scrubs
- Sons of Butcher
- South Park
- Sports Action Team
- Stag
- Star Trek
- Stargate Atlantis
- Street Tuner Challenge
- Stupid, Stupid Man
- Superbikes
- Spawn
- Spooks
- Survivor (Borneo to Cook Islands) †
- Tales from the Darkside
- The 4400
- The Academy
- The Agency
- The Bronx Is Burning
- The Cleaner
- The Collector
- The Colbert Report
- The Daily Show
- The Dead Zone
- The Gamekillers
- The Guard
- The IT Crowd
- The King of Queens
- The Lost Room
- The Mind of the Married Man
- The Nutshack
- The Office
- The Real Wedding Crashers
- The Twilight Zone
- The Ultimate Fighter (*)
- The Wild Side
- The Wrong Coast
- Three Sheets
- Ultimate Blackjack Tour
- UFC Unleashed (*)
- UFC Wired (*)
- Unique Whips
- V-Twin TV
- Vroom Vroom
- World Poker Tour
- Wide World of Fights
- World Supercross GP
- World's Wildest Police Videos
- WWE 24/7 PPV Classics
- X-Play

(*) - Now moved to Balls

(†) - This show was first aired on UHF TV channel Studio 23, Later seasons, beginning with Survivor: Fiji to the latest season, This show were moved to Solar Entertainment's flagship multi-media channels: The VHF TV station Solar TV (RPN), cable channel Jack TV, the now-defunct cable channel C/S and C/S Origin, and the previous seasons on Q of GMA Network

== Movies and specials ==
- MAXXX Showtime
