= Mag TV Na =

- Created by: ABS-CBN Regional Network Group
- Starring: Various MAG TV Na hosts in selected programs
- Country of origin: Philippines
- Original languages: Filipino (MAG TV Na, Atin 'To!); Baguio; Bicolano (MAG TV Na, Oragon!); Naga; Hiligaynon (MAG TV Na, Amiga!); Bacolod; Cebuano (MAG TV Na!, MAG TV Na, Asenso Ta! and MAG TV Na, Mag Negosyo Ta!); Cebu, Cagayan de Oro and Davao; Chavacano (Mag TV, De Aton Este!); Zamboanga
- No. of episodes: n/a (airs every Sunday)

Production
- Running time: 60 Minutes

Original release
- Network: ABS-CBN
- Release: April 6, 2008 – June 24, 2018

Related
- Bisaya Ni! (A2Z Regional)

Mag TV Na was the brand of regional talk or magazine shows (as the title suggests) of different ABS-CBN Regional stations in the Philippines. There were some versions of MAG TV Na use magazine-like graphics. An example is a video squeezed into a page of a magazine. The Mag TV Na family of programs were not available in the Metro Manila market.

After 10 years of airing, Mag TV Na made its final broadcast as part of cost-cutting measures in preparation of ABS-CBN Regional's digitalization to align with Manila's flagship television station after Kapamilya, Mas Winner Ka! (ended on June 23 in Bacolod and ended on June 30 in Cebu and Davao), Agri Tayo Dito and selected regional editions of TV Patrol (which also made their final broadcasts on June 29).

Original titlecard of Mag TV Na used from 2008 to 2011.

== List of MAG TV Na programs (final) ==
- MAG TV Na, Atin 'To! (Baguio)
- MAG TV Na, Oragon! (Naga)
- MAG TV Na, Amiga! (Bacolod)
- MAG TV Na! (Cebu)
- MAG TV Na! De Aton Este! (Zamboanga)
- MAG TV Na, Asenso Ta! (Cagayan de Oro)
- MAG TV Na! Southern Mindanao (Davao)

== Defunct Mag TV Na program ==
- MAG TV Na, Waraynon! (Tacloban)

NOTE: MAG TV Na, Waraynon was cancelled in 2015 and was replaced by the Cebuano edition.

== Mag TV Na areas ==
=== Luzon ===
MAG TV Na, Atin To!

- Baguio (station-produced)
- Laoag
- Vigan
- Tuguegarao
- Isabela
- Dagupan
- Olongapo
- Pampanga
- San Pablo
- Batangas
- Lucena
- Palawan

MAG TV Na, Oragon!

- Daet
- Naga (station-produced)
- Legazpi

=== Visayas ===
MAG TV Na, Amiga!

- Kalibo
- Roxas
- Iloilo
- Bacolod (station-produced)

MAG TV Na!

- Dumaguete
- Cebu (station-produced)
- Bohol
- Tacloban

=== Mindanao ===
Mag TV, De Aton Este!

- Dipolog
- Pagadian
- Zamboanga (station-produced)

Mag TV Na! Asenso Ta!

- Cagayan de Oro (station-produced)
- Iligan
- Butuan

MAG TV Na! Southern Mindanao!

- Davao (station-produced)
- General Santos
- Koronadal
- Cotabato

== See also ==
- Ang TV
- ABS-CBN Regional Channel
