= Hero (TV channel) =

Defunct Philippine pay television channel

- Hero TV final logo (2015–2018)
- Country: Philippines
- Broadcast area: Nationwide
- Network: ABS-CBN
- Headquarters: ABS-CBN Broadcasting Center, Sgt. Esguerra Avenue corner Mother Ignacia Street, Diliman, Quezon City, Philippines

Programming
- Language: Filipino
- Picture format: 480i (SDTV)

Ownership
- Owner: Creative Programs Inc.
- Sister channels: ANC, ABS-CBN Regional Channel, Asianovela Channel (free trial), Cine Mo!, Cinema One, DZMM TeleRadyo, Jeepney TV, Lifestyle, Liga, Movie Central (free trial), Myx, O Shopping, Yey!

History
- Launched: September 1, 2005 (Test broadcast); November 12, 2005; 20 years ago (Official launch)
- Closed: February 1, 2018; 8 years ago (Defunct)
- Replaced by: Liga (Cable channel space)

Links
- Website: cablechannels.abs-cbn.com/hero/

Hero
- Hero (digital) logo
- Website type: Social media Web portal Digital news
- Available in: Filipino, English
- Successor: YeY! Channel (Online channel space)
- Headquarters: ABS-CBN Broadcasting Center, Diliman, Quezon City, Philippines, Philippines
- Area served: Worldwide (Internet)
- Owner: ABS-CBN Corporation
- Key people: Ces Oreña-Drilon; Paolo Pineda
- Launched: February 7, 2018
- Current status: Inactive (since June 2021; as a pop-culture platform); Active (since September 2023; as reposts from Ani-One Philippines)

Hero (also known as Hero TV and visually rendered in all capital letters) was a 24-hour Philippine pay television channel created by ABS-CBN's narrowcast arm Creative Programs Inc. from 2005 to 2018. The programming was composed primarily of Filipino-dubbed Japanese anime series. It was dubbed as "The First and All Tagalog-dubbed Anime Channel in the Philippines."

In February 2018, Hero was relaunched as a digital web portal operated by ABS-CBN Digital Media, providing news content on anime, pop culture and gaming. However, the website later became inactive.

== Background ==
Logos used from 2005 to 2014. Top logo was used until 2010 when the center logo was used until April 2013 and the bottom logo used until December 2014. All logos are actually similar with the removal of the black outline from the second version and the addition of a backdrop graffiti design with indent slogan and thin black outline to the third version.

Much of the content in the channel is attributed to the fact that Creative Programs' parent company ABS-CBN Corporation (through its main network) has produced numerous dubs of anime series many years before the launch of Hero, as well as maintained an Animax airing block for quite sometime. Aside from those, the channel also airs anime that have not yet seen in any terrestrial or cable channel shown in the Philippines prior to its first showing in the channel, such as Mirmo de Pon!.

The channel also once featured anime series dubbed by Telesuccess, Inc., the supplier for most of the anime series aired on GMA Network, before transferring them all to TeleAsia. Some of these are Love Hina, Rune Soldier, and Shaman King. Others seen in the channel were previously shown in English on Cartoon Network's Philippine feed (i.e. Crush Gear Turbo) or, in the case of Zettai Muteki Raijin-Oh, on government-controlled RPN which in 1969 having taking over several channel frequencies and transmitter broadcast facilities previously held and used by ABS-CBN, notably Channel 9.

Furthermore, Hero TV featured re-dubs (i.e. producing its own dubbed version of a previous anime series which was already dubbed in Tagalog). Examples of these are Mon Colle Knights, Metal Fighter Miku, Zenki, The Slayers, and Voltes V.

In 2011, undubbed anime was introduced to the channel with accompanying Filipino-language subtitles, in the form of Yu-Gi-Oh! The Movie: Pyramid of Light and the Initial D Extra Stage OVA. The reason for airing these two anime features in their original Japanese audio is unknown.

Ever since its launch in 2005, Hero TV operated on a daily 18-hour-a-day schedule from 6 AM to 12 midnight during the first months of their operation. In April 2006, the channel expanded its operating hours to 20 hours, thus signing off at 2 AM of the following day. On January 3, 2011, Hero TV finally transitioned into a full 24-hour cable TV service.

In the summer season of 2012, Hero TV starts to greatly increase its lineup of new anime titles beginning with Yu-Gi-Oh! 5Ds, Toaru Kagaku no Railgun, Naruto Shippūden, Hanasaku Iroha, and Shiki; as well as airing the first two series of the Sailor Moon franchise, and a more complete version of the Aniplex-produced Jigoku Shoujo. Except for Sailor Moon, Jigoku Shoujo and Toaru Kagaku no Railgun, all of these titles have never been aired on Animax before (Animax airs Railgun and Sailor Moon in other countries).

=== Closure and migration to digital media ===
On December 23, 2017, an Anime Pilipinas article stated that Hero TV will end its broadcast operations on January 31, 2018, due to lack of advertising support and change in business direction which was later announced on January 1. This was further confirmed through a commercial that aired on the channel on January 16, 2018.

During the final day of broadcast on January 31, 2018, Hero TV aired a Facebook live broadcast where its hosts and staffs shared great memories and thanked supporters. After airing a tribute video showing the past anime titles, local programs and events produced or sponsored by the channel, Hero TV signed off for the last time on February 1, 2018, at 12:04 AM, ending with a farewell message and the words "Hero Now Signing Off." Few seconds later, cable providers still receiving Hero TV would see the modified EBU test card reading "ABS-CBN TOC SD" before shutdown until the provider can replace it or automatically scan with another channel, while Sky Cable have replaced Hero TV with Liga, a sports channel that complements the programming of S+A with international and local sports events.

On February 7, 2018, Hero relaunches, and demoted into a digital web portal handled by the Lifestyle team from ABS-CBN Digital Media, but will not carry anime titles nor establish an anime video-on-demand service. It will provide limited news content on anime, pop culture and gaming.

In March 2018, Jeepney TV featured the Hero Zone (a former anime block of ABS-CBN's main channel in 2006) as a two-hour weekend morning anime block, beginning with Yu-Gi-Oh! Arc-V and KonoSuba. The block was later discontinued in July 2018 to focus on local programming.

=== Yey! channel's All YeY! Anime programming block ===
Yey!, a digital television channel of ABS-CBN TV Plus, aired some of the newest anime series that debuted on the channel, including Ace of Diamond (season 1), My Hero Academia (seasons 1 and 2), One-Punch Man (season 1), Doraemon (2005 version), the final two seasons of Naruto Shippūden (seasons 9 and 10), and the first 51 episodes of Boruto: Naruto Next Generations (season 1). Yey! ceased broadcasting in mid-2020, with Cardcaptor Sakura: Clear Card served as the last anime series broadcast on the channel; Clear Card would later resume airing on A2Z in 2021, completing all the episodes.
