= In da Loop =

- Title card
- Also known as: CGETV In da Loop
- Genre: Reality show Talk show
- Created by: CgeTV
- Written by: Joaquin Acosta; Marie Bernice Bautista; Karlo Angelo "Kimo" Cea; Jose Claudio Guerrero; Patch Buenaventura
- Directed by: The Jemster; Lorenzo Marcos
- Presented by: Jobert Austria; Chacha Balba; Edu Ibazeta; Jessica Mendoza; Nikko Ramos; Anna Tan
- Country of origin: Philippines
- Original language: Filipino
- No. of episodes: 135

Production
- Executive producer: Grachel Castro
- Editors: Joyce Alvaro; Jimmy Ayson; Rey Garcia; Patrick Lee Peñalosa
- Running time: 30 minutes (ABS-CBN); 60 minutes (CgeTV)

Original release
- Network: ABS-CBN; Cge TV
- Release: April 23 – October 26, 2012

Related
- Music Uplate Live; O Shopping

In da Loop (lit. In The Loop) is a Philippine television reality show broadcast by ABS-CBN and Cge TV. Hosted by Jobert Austria, Chacha Balba, Edu Ibazeta, Jessica Mendoza, Nikko Ramos and Anna Tan, it aired from April 23, 2012 to October 26, 2012.

== Hosts ==
=== CgeTV Jocks ===
SEASON 1

- Jobert Austria
- Chacha Balba
- Edu Ibazeta
- Anna Tan
- Nikko Ramos
- Jessica Mendoza
- Marc McMahon

SEASON 2

- Jobert Austria
- Chacha Balba
- Edu Ibazeta
- Anna Tan
- Karen Dematera
- Janeena Chan
- Jaz Reyes
- Terence Lloyd
- Marc McMahon
- DJ Bane Tulfo

=== CgeTV SuperChannels ===
- Christian Bautista
- K Brosas
- Coach Rio Dela Cruz
- Jhai Ho
- Anna Tan
- DJ Chacha

== Segments ==
- Ahhh - Mature!
- Angst TV
- Antic Shop
- Awesome!
- CgeTV In Da Net
- Cgeparazzi
- Cgezen On the Go!
- Cge U
- Cute!
- Dear Ate Chacha
- Dine Hard
- How 2D2
- Lifecast
- Like A Sikat
- Male Room
- Master Bati
- Press Play
- Reporting for Beauty
- Somewhere Out Dare
- Sample! Sample!
- Ur The Star
- Usapang Lalaki
- What the tech!
- Welcome to CgeTV

== See also ==
- List of programs broadcast by ABS-CBN
- CgeTV
