= CgeTV =

Defunct television channel in the Philippines

- Country: Philippines
- Broadcast area: Defunct
- Network: ABS-CBN

Programming
- Languages: English, Filipino
- Picture format: 480i (SDTV) datascreen

Ownership
- Owner: ABS-CBN Interactive
- Sister channels: ABS-CBN News Channel, DZMM TeleRadyo, Cinema One, Hero, Kapamilya Channel, Knowledge Channel, Lifestyle, Myx, Balls, Velvet

History
- Launched: December 20, 2010
- Closed: September 30, 2012
- Replaced by: Jeepney TV

Links
- Website: https://www.cge.tv

CGE.TV
- Website type: Video hosting service
- Available in: English, Tagalog
- Dissolved: September 30, 2012
- Headquarters: Quezon City, Philippines
- Owner: ABS-CBN Interactive
- Commercial: Yes
- Registration: Free
- Launched: December 20, 2010
- Current status: Defunct/Inactive

CgeTV was a user-generated video channel and current internet video-sharing website created by ABS-CBN Interactive. On cable, CgeTV aired exclusively on SkyCable Digital channel 72.

== Programming ==
=== CgeTV programs ===
- In da Loop (also broadcast on ABS-CBN, now moved to Jeepney TV)
- Cge Mishmash
- The Viewing Room
- Let's Sync It!
- Dancesingcredible
- Supercgezen
- Dance Entertainment

=== Segments of CgeTV In da Loop ===
- Cute
- Usapang Lalake
- How2D2
- Reporting for Beauty
- Your the Star
- Sports (on https://cge.tv)

=== Non CgeTV programs ===
- It's Showtime (live on CgeTV website only with no commercial breaks, also broadcast on ABS-CBN (now moved to Kapamilya Channel, Kapamilya Online Live, Kapuso Stream, A2Z, All TV, and GMA Network))

== Final CgeJocks ==
- Edu Ibazeta
- Czarina Balba-Guevarra
- Anna Tan
- Ashley Rivera
- Jobert Austria

== See also ==
- PIE Channel
- ABS-CBN Interactive
