= ABS-CBN Regional Channel =

Defunct television channel in the Philippines

- Country: Philippines
- Broadcast area: Defunct (television); Philippines (iWantTFC)
- Network: ABS-CBN Regional
- Headquarters: Quezon City, Philippines

Ownership
- Owner: ABS-CBN Corporation; Creative Programs

History
- Launched: August 1, 2016; 9 years ago (test broadcast); March 20, 2017; 8 years ago (official launch)
- Closed: January 14, 2018; 7 years ago
- Replaced by: Liga (channel space on Sky Direct)

ABS-CBN Regional Channel was a Philippine pay television channel which aired programming from the regional television and radio stations owned by ABS-CBN. The channel was launched as a test broadcast on August 1, 2016, and was officially launched on March 20, 2017.

ARC was the network's second attempt to have a subscription-television channel solely dedicated to regional programming. In 1996, when the then-Sarimanok Channel 37 (now ABS-CBN News Channel) was launched, 80% of its programming were produced in the network's regional operations centers located in Baguio, Bacolod, Cagayán de Oro, Cebú, Davao, Naga, Zamboanga, among others. The programming consists of newscasts which is aired live via satellite, public affairs shows such as Banat Visayas, Sulong Mindanao, drama, comedy and musical programs.

On January 10, 2018, ABS-CBN Corporation and Creative Programs announced that the channel would closedown on January 14, 2018, alongside Tag. Meanwhile, ABS-CBN Regional Channel on Sky Direct was rebranded as Liga, a sports channel that complements the programming of S+A with international football and local sports events, which was silently launched earlier on January 1.

Though it ceased broadcasting locally, ABS-CBN Regional Channel continued its international broadcast via iWantTFC until January 1, 2021.

== Final programming ==
=== Newscasts ===
==== Luzon ====
- TV Patrol North Luzon (Baguio/Dagupan/Laoag/Isabela/Pampanga)
- TV Patrol Southern Tagalog (Batangas)
- TV Patrol Bicol (Naga)

==== Visayas ====
- TV Patrol Panay (Iloilo)
- TV Patrol Negros (Bacolod)
- TV Patrol Central Visayas (Cebu)
- TV Patrol Eastern Visayas (Tacloban)

==== Mindanao ====
- TV Patrol Chavacano (Zamboanga)
- TV Patrol North Mindanao (Cagayan de Oro)
- TV Patrol Southern Mindanao (Davao)
- TV Patrol South Central Mindanao (General Santos)

=== Current affairs reruns ===
- Ano Ngani? (Tacloban)
- Arangkada (Cagayan de Oro)
- Bida Kapampangan (Pampanga)
- Salandigan (Bacolod)

=== Magazine shows ===
- Agri Tayo Dito
- Mag TV Na
  - Mag TV Na, Amiga! (Bacolod)
  - Mag TV Na, Atin 'To! (Baguio)
  - Mag TV Na, Oragon! (Naga)
  - Mag TV Na, Asenso Ta! (Cagayan de Oro)
  - Mag TV Na! (Cebu)
  - Mag TV Na! Southern Mindanao (Davao)
  - Mag TV Na, De Aton Este! (Zamboanga)

=== Variety ===
- Kapamilya, Mas Winner Ka! (Cebu, Bacolod and Davao editions)
- Kapamilya Fiesta World (Co-produced by The Filipino Channel)
- Kapamilya Karavan
- MOR Cebu's Tingog Bisaya

== See also ==
- ABS-CBN
