= Music Uplate Live =

- Also known as: M.U. Live
- Genre: Variety show
- Presented by: Yeng Constantino; Tutti Caringal
- Country of origin: Philippines
- Original language: Filipino

Production
- Running time: 90 minutes

Original release
- Network: ABS-CBN
- Release: March 15, 2010 – September 2, 2011

Related
- Games Uplate Live; In da Loop

Music Uplate Live (also known as M.U. Live) is a Philippine television variety show broadcast by ABS-CBN. Hosted by Yeng Constantino and Tutti Caringal, it aired from March 15, 2010 to September 2, 2011, replacing Pinoy Big Brother: Double UpLate.

== Hosts ==
- Yeng Constantino (Monday-Thursday)
- Tutti Caringal (Monday-Thursday)
- Gazelle "Speedy Gee" Canlas (Monday-Friday)
- Martin Concio (Monday-Friday)

== Guest Hosts ==
- Nicole Hyala and Chris Tsuper (Friday)

== Segments ==
- Tambayan Hit Chart (Monday)
- Odyssey/Astrovision Hit Charts (Tuesday)
- Pinoy Myx Countdown Top 5 (Wednesday)
- Musicology (Thursday)
- Break Mo 'To Artist (Friday)
- MMQ
- My Playlist
- Uplate Update

HEARTS2HEARTS
