= Zee Sine =

Filipino language television channel

- Logo used since 2017
- Country: Philippines
- Headquarters: Manila, Philippines

Programming
- Language: Filipino
- Picture format: 1080p HDTV

Ownership
- Owner: Zee Entertainment Enterprises
- Sister channels: Zee Bollymovies; Zee One; Zee TV; Anmol TV; Zee Cinema; Zee News; Zee World

History
- Launched: April 5, 2016 (original) (first incarnation); April 2025 (relaunch) (second incarnation)
- Closed: February 29, 2020 (original) (3 years, 10 months and 24 days, first incarnation)
- Replaced by: Cine Mo! (Cignal channel space)

Availability

Streaming media
- Samsung TV Plus: Internet Protocol television (Philippines only)

Zee Sine also known as Z Sine is a Filipino language motion pictures-oriented channel in the Philippines. It was originally the first Indian pay television channel in the Philippines owned by Zee network of the Zee Entertainment Enterprises under the stewardship of Vinod Kumar, VP of Prase in Manila. The original incarnation as a pay TV channel was closed on February 29, 2020 but it was later revived as a free ad-supported streaming television (FAST) channel in April 2025 for Samsung TV Plus in the Philippines. This channel aired mostly Hindi-language (Bollywood) movies dubbed in Tagalog.

== History ==
Logo used from 2017-2020, and April-June 2025

Following the success of Zee Nung (Thailand) and Zee Bioskop (Indonesia), the Zee Entertainment Enterprises launched another Southeast Asian channel of Zee Entertainment Group, this time in the Philippines. Zee Sine made its first airing date in April 2016. Zee Sine is available on SkyCable (Manila, Cebu and Davao only, since October 15, 2018; primarily included in Sky Basic package as a free channel and later as an add-on pay channel since July 15, 2019), CableLink, G-Sat Digital Cable TV and Easy TV. Zee Sine was also available on Cignal from April 2016 to September 2018. It was announced that the channel ceased broadcast on March 1, 2020 at midnight.

In April 2025, Zee Sine was relaunched as a free ad-supported streaming television channel (FAST) for Samsung TV Plus exclusively in the Philippines. Alongside Zee Sine, Zee also brought its existing FAST channels, Zee One (a general entertainment channel focusing on Indian soap operas that are dubbed in English) and Zee Bollymovies (a movie channel similar to Zee Sine but dubbed in English), to the same platform.

== Blocks and programs ==
=== Movie Blocks ===
Note: All featured movies are dubbed in Tagalog, with song sequences subtitled in Tagalog.

- Star of the Month
- Bollywood Divas
- Pinoy Bollywood Box Office

=== Other programming ===
(Note: Programs are aired in English audio and/or with English subtitles):

==== General Entertainment ====
- Look Who's Talking with Niranjan
- Starry Nights 2.O
- Music video fillers (if featured movie ended in at least 2 hours)
- Hello Bollywood (travel telemagazine)
- They're Not Just Sup(p)erstars

==== Drama Zeeries (Indian Hindi serials) ====
(Aired every Monday to Friday 3:00-6:00pm; with replays next day at 9:00am–12:00pm except that Friday episodes are aired on Monday the coming week)

- Fire and Ice
- Twist of Fate
- Mehek

(Aired on Saturdays and Sundays, 3:00-6:00pm)

- Kindred Hearts

Previously aired programs:

- Lies of the Heart
- Gangaa
