= Agri Tayo Dito =

- Created by: ABS-CBN Regional Network Group
- Starring: Ruben Gonzaga
- Country of origin: Philippines
- Original language: Tagalog
- No. of episodes: n/a (airs weekly)

Production
- Producer: ABS-CBN Davao
- Running time: 30 Minutes

Original release
- Network: All ABS-CBN Regional Channels (except Metro Manila); ABS-CBN Regional Channel
- Release: July 15, 2012 – June 24, 2018

Agri Tayo Dito (lit. 'Let's Do Agri Here', "Agri" being the shortened term for "agriculture") was a livelihood program of ABS-CBN Regional stations in the Philippines, produced by ABS-CBN Davao. It was hosted by Pinoy Big Brother: Celebrity Edition 2 Big Winner Ruben Gonzaga and was broadcast on Sunday mornings from 7:00 a.m. to 7:30 a.m.

The program was not available in the Metro Manila area as it is primarily served by Swak na Swak, produced by Bayan Productions. It also have reruns on Knowledge Channel and on the ABS-CBN Regional Channel.

== Overview ==
Agri Tayo Dito aimed to provide the best practices and tips on agricultural production for small and medium enterprises in the major provinces of the Philippines. The show has covered farming, livestock, poultry, fisheries, game fowl and other agricultural products, price monitoring, marketing and other government and private support programs. It also presents success stories from the country's agricultural sector and promotes organic farming. The program was intended to be a fresh, new way of presenting agriculture to the current mall culture-oriented generation.

After 6 years, the program ended on June 24, 2018, for its last day of airing as a cost-cutting measure to digitize ABS-CBN Regional stations.

== Final segments ==
- Oh My Gulay (tips on backyard farming)
- Itanim na yan! (planting tips)
- Sarap Kita (tips on putting up a small food business)
- Agri Bida (success stories)
- Agri mazing (farming innovations)
- Hanep Baboy (tips on hog raising)
- Tanong Mo, Sagot Ko (answers frequently-asked-questions raised by viewers)

== Agri Tayo Dito areas ==
=== Luzon ===
- Metro Manila (via Knowledge Channel)
- Laoag
- Vigan
- Tuguegarao
- Isabela
- Baguio
- Dagupan
- Olongapo
- Pampanga
- San Pablo, Laguna
- Batangas
- Lucena
- Palawan
- Daet
- Naga
- Legazpi

=== Visayas ===
- Kalibo
- Roxas
- Iloilo
- Bacolod
- Dumaguete
- Cebu
- Tacloban

=== Mindanao ===
- Iligan
- Cagayan de Oro
- Butuan
- Davao (station-produced)
- General Santos
- Koronadal
- Cotabato
- Pagadian
- Dipolog
- Zamboanga
