= Kapamilya, Mas Winner Ka! =

Philippine game show

- Also known as: Kapamilya Winner Ka!
- Created by: ABS-CBN Regional Network Group
- Country of origin: Philippines
- Original languages: Hiligaynon (Ilonggo) (with Tagalog subtitles) (for Bacolod); Cebuano with Waray (with Tagalog subtitles) (for Cebu and Davao)
- No. of episodes: 547

Production
- Production locations: ABS-CBN Bacolod Studios, Lacson Street, Bacolod City (ABS-CBN TV-4 Bacolod); ABS-CBN Cebu Studios, North Road, Jagobiao, Mandaue City (ABS-CBN TV-3 Cebu); ABS-CBN Davao Studios, Shrine Hills, Matina, Davao City (ABS-CBN TV-4 Davao)
- Running time: 1 hour

Original release
- Network: ABS-CBN Regional
- Release: October 27, 2007 – June 30, 2018

Kapamilya, Mas Winner Ka! (lit. 'Kapamilya, you are more of a winner', formerly Kapamilya Winner Ka! lit. 'Kapamilya, you are a winner') was a Saturday morning game show produced by ABS-CBN Regional and aired in the Visayas (through TV-3 Cebu and TV-4 Bacolod) and Mindanao (through TV-4 Davao) using Cebuano and Hiligaynon, as well as nationwide on ABS-CBN Regional Channel. In this show, the monthly winner have a chance to win plus studio tour and a chance to watch the variety show It's Showtime live. It replaced the now-defunct variety shows in Bacolod, Cebu and Davao on October 27, 2007. After almost 11 years, the game show concluded on June 30, 2018, in Bacolod, Cebu and Davao as a cost-cutting measure to digitize all ABS-CBN Regional stations.

== Hosts ==
- For Bacolod Production - PBB Season 2 Housemate Nel Rapiz, Dot-dot Pahilanga and Rexy Cabaltera-Reyes (now in Canada).
- For Cebu Production - Roy Empleo, Christine Fernandez (Optometrist), Mia Zeeba M. Ali Faridoon (Miss Cebu 2011), Nicole Tuazon (Miss Mandaue 2012), Joseph Teves (Nurse, Kboyz member), Fidel Cascabel (Medical Technologist, Kboyz member) and Daryll Carillo (Financial Advisor, Nurse, Kboyz member).
- For Davao Production - Rovic Cuasito (Dentist by profession and former KSP Host), Redge Ledesma (an HRM Student and former KSP co-Host) and Cherry Maning (Mutya ng Dabaw 2010 2nd Runner Up and former GMA Davao news anchor).

== The game ==
The show begins with its theme song and the game start with a certain themed dance game. There are 50 players to be selected through computer and 25 of them will be qualified for the next round. One of the players will receive a PhP500 prize inside the hat.

Another round comes with the selection of 5 players through a "bingo-like" pattern. The pattern will be selected by a guest celebrity. If one of the five contestants answered the question wrong, there will be a change of selection of another 5 contestants in another pattern. If all 5 contestants answered correctly, they will proceed to the next round (the Question and Answer round).

On the third round, one of the 5 contestants will answer correctly and select the number. The saidnumber will appear on other players and sometimes the player itself. The contestant with 4 numbers appeared, whether he/she answered or not, will go to the bonus round. In the event that 2 or more contestants have 4 numbers each, they will go on to "Sudden Death." "Sudden Death" refers to a tie-breaking question. Whoever answers the question first and correctly will go to the bonus round.

Finally, in the bonus round, the player (who already qualified for the monthly challenge round) will be given 2 patterns and the numbers appeared on the computer. The computer will automatically select the winning pattern. If the player guessed the 5 numbers correctly according to the computer-selected pattern, he/she will receive PhP3,000 cash.

== The Monthly Qualifying Round ==
Prior to the game, the players must have a qualifying rounds. Once is complete, will get exactly a prize money.

== Simulcasting areas ==
- Iloilo
- Kalibo
- Roxas
- Dumaguete
- Tacloban
- Cagayan de Oro
- Iligan
- Butuan
- General Santos
- Koronadal
- Cotabato
- Dipolog
- Pagadian
- Zamboanga

In the Visayas and Mindanao, Kapamilya, Mas Winner Ka! broadcasts in selected areas carried over Bacolod, Cebu and Davao.

== See also ==
- 1 vs. 100
- ABS-CBN Regional Network Group
- It's Showtime
- Game Ka Na Ba?
- Sabado Barkada (2003-2007; ABS-CBN Bacolod)
- Sabado Na Gyud (later retitled as Sabado na, Game pa! (1995-2005, 2005-2007; ABS-CBN Cebu)
- KSP: Kapamilya Sabado Party (2005-2007; ABS-CBN Davao)
- SBD Jam (1996-2005; ABS-CBN Davao)
- Zambo Jambo (1997-2005; ABS-CBN Zamboanga)
- Tsada! (1998-2005; ABS-CBN Cagayan De Oro)
- Wowowee
- Pilipinas Win Na Win
- Happy Yipee Yehey!
