= MagTV Na Sadya Ta! =

- Also known as: MAG TV Na! Southern Mindanao; Mag TV Na, Mag Negosyo Ta!
- Created by: ABS-CBN TV-4 Davao
- Developed by: ABS-CBN Regional Network Group
- Starring: Onnie Alfaro; Lady Bam
- Country of origin: Philippines
- Original language: Cebuano
- No. of episodes: n/a (airs weekly)

Production
- Production location: Davao City
- Running time: 30 mins.

Original release
- Network: ABS-CBN TV-4 Davao
- Release: April 6, 2008 – June 24, 2018

Related
- Dinhing Dapita Sadya

Mag TV Na! Southern Mindanao (formerly MagTV Na Sadya Ta! and Mag TV Na, Mag Negosyo Ta!) was a weekly entertainment show of ABS-CBN Davao Entertainment Group that airs every Sunday at 9:00am (PST). On October 27, 2013, it is shown as a spin-off show named MAG TV Na, Mag Negosyo Ta!, currently hosted by Onnie Alfaro and Lady Bam, and later reverted to MAG TV Na, similar to the Cebu edition with the same name. This show has been part of Mag TV Na.

== Final hosts ==
- Onnie Alfaro
- Carly Chua (Guest Host)

=== Past ===
- Lady Bam Petilos
- Maikee Aportadera (formerly from TV5 Davao, now the Chief of the City Sports Office)
- Eureka Gildo
- Susan "Zansu" Escasinas
- Id Acaylar
- Nadia Shami
- Joey Concepcion
- Glenn Antaran
- Ian Garcia

== Final segments ==
- Onnie 911
- Luwag ni Ian
- MagSuroy Ta!

=== Defunct ===
- Dabaw Dyoks Squad
- TipTopTips
- Misyon Makeover

== See also ==
- Mag TV Na
- ABS-CBN Regional Network Group
