= Mag TV Na, De Aton Este! =

- Genre: Talk show
- Created by: ABS-CBN TV-3 Zamboanga
- Developed by: ABS-CBN Regional Network Group
- Starring: Kathy Daculan
- Country of origin: Philippines
- Original language: Chabacano
- No. of episodes: n/a (airs weekly)

Production
- Production location: Zamboanga City
- Running time: 30 mins.

Original release
- Network: ABS-CBN TV-3 Zamboanga
- Release: April 6, 2008 – June 24, 2018

Related
- WOW!

Mag TV Na, De Aton Este was a weekly entertainment show of ABS-CBN Zamboanga in Zamboanga Peninsula and part of the brand regional magazine or talk show Mag TV Na. The Zamboangueño version of this show usually featured important events around the city as well as the region. However, Mag TV Na, De Aton Este focused mostly on scenic spots around mainland Zamboanga City, Zamboanga del Norte, Zamboanga del Sur and the island provinces (Basilan, Sulu and Tawi-Tawi) around it. Hosted by Kathy Daculan, Mag TV was seen on Sundays before Matanglawin on ABS-CBN TV-3 Zamboanga.

== Hosts ==
=== Final host ===
- Kathy Daculan

=== Previous hosts ===
- VP Elago
- Zahra Zamora
- JV Bue
- Karen Claire Grafia
- Esprite Ebias†
- Lulu Gerolaga
- Kelly Bernardo
- Jayne Rebollos "Kikay" Rañin
- Marian Leonador

== See also ==
- Mag TV Na
- DXLL-TV
- ABS-CBN Regional Network Group
