= Zee One =

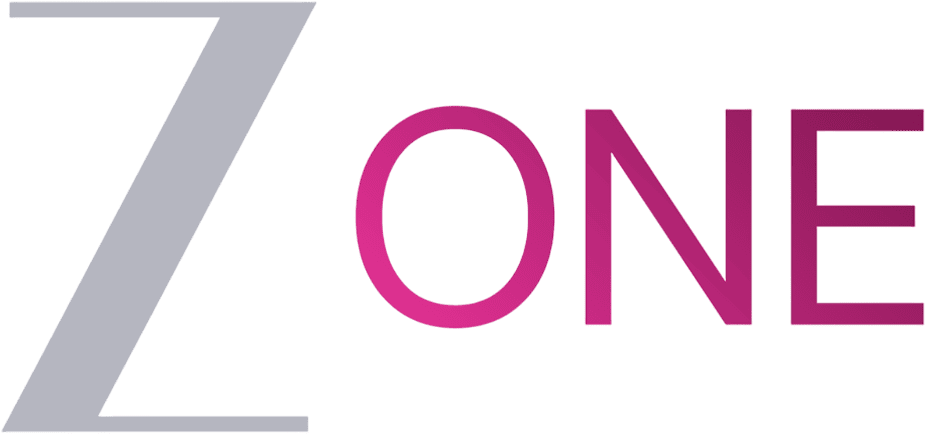
- Logo used since 2025
- Country: Germany
- Broadcast area: Germany, Austria
- Headquarters: Munich, Germany

Programming
- Language: German
- Picture format: 1080p HDTV

Ownership
- Owner: Zee Entertainment Enterprises

History
- Launched: 28 July 2016; 10 years ago 13 September 2023 (revival)
- Closed: 31 May 2020

Zee One is a general entertainment channel in Germany which was launched at 8pm on 28 July 2016.

It brought a wide variety of Bollywood productions to Germany, such as series, musicals, comedies, drama films, romantic films, family films and music videos. The station was a commercial free-to-air TV station, with regular programming being interrupted by commercial breaks.

The channel ceased broadcasting on 31 May 2020.

On 13 September 2023, the channel relaunched throughout partnership with Samsung TV Plus.
