= Liga (TV channel) =

Defunct Philippine sports TV channel

- Country: Philippines
- Network: ABS-CBN

Ownership
- Owner: ABS-CBN Sports, Creative Programs

History
- Launched: January 1, 2018
- Replaced: ABS-CBN Regional Channel (channel space)
- Closed: October 30, 2020 (closure of sports division)
- Replaced by: Cine Mo! (on cable)

Liga (transl. League) was a Philippine pay television channel owned by Creative Programs, Inc. and ABS-CBN Sports as a content provider. It was the sister channel of ABS-CBN Sports and Action (S+A), it began on January 1, 2018, as test broadcast and officially launched on January 16, as the permanent replacement of three CPI-owned channels, ABS-CBN Regional Channel, Tag TV, and Hero TV (through its channel space).

Liga was the official broadcast partner of the 2018 FIFA World Cup and the 2018 FIFA World Cup European Qualifiers in Russia, along with S+A. Aside from FIFA World Cup, the channel also broadcast local and international sports coverage including the Maharlika Pilipinas Basketball League (MPBL), ASEAN Basketball League (ABL), NCAA, University Athletic Association of the Philippines (UAAP), Premier Volleyball League (PVL), Philippine Azkals matches, Pinoy Pride boxing promotions, ONE Championship fights, and classic basketball and volleyball games from the UAAP.

The channel became the interim replacement of ABS-CBN Sports and Action (S+A) which ceased free-to-air broadcast operations as ordered by the National Telecommunications Commission (NTC) on May 5, 2020, due to the lapsed of ABS-CBN's legislative broadcast franchise.

After 2 years and 10 months of broadcast, Liga ceased on October 30, 2020 due to programming redundancies, lack of advertising support, and cost-cutting measures, as well as the implementation of a retrenchment program that covers its business from August 7, following a 70-11 vote by the House of Representatives Representative denied the company a new franchise by congress on July 10 and the dissolution of ABS-CBN Sports on August 31. The last program to air on this channel was a replay of UAAP Season 78 Men's Basketball Finals. After airing, a tribute video showing the past sports coverage, local programs and events produced or sponsored by ABS-CBN Sports. Liga channel signed off for the last time on October 29, 2020, ending with Lupang Hinirang, an ABS-CBN's official Philippine National Anthem 2011 video before signed off at 12 midnight on October 30. The channel's cable space was later taken over by Cine Mo!, a complementary movie channel consisting of local films and foreign movies, seen on SkyCable and selected provincial cable providers (including Converge ICT's Vision and Streamtech's Planet Cable).

== Final Programming ==
=== Main programming ===
- UAAP (now with One Sports)
- NCAA (later with GMA Network, now with One Sports)
- PVL (now with One Sports)
- MPBL (later with IBC, TAP DMV, A2Z and One PH, now with Solar Sports)
- ONE Championship (now with One Sports)

=== Original programming ===
- The Score
- Extra Rice
- Kalye Confessions
- MPBL Beyond
- Team FitFil (2020)
- TBH
- Upfront

== See also ==
- ABS-CBN Sports (dissolved)
- ABS-CBN (inactive)
- Balls (defunct)
- S+A (defunct)
