= Asianovela Channel =

Defunct digital television channel in the Philippines

- Country: Philippines
- Network: ABS-CBN
- Headquarters: ABS-CBN Broadcasting Center, Diliman, Quezon City, Philippines

Programming
- Language: Filipino
- Picture format: 480i (SDTV)

Ownership
- Owner: ABS-CBN Corporation
- Sister channels: Cine Mo!; DZMM TeleRadyo; Jeepney TV; Knowledge Channel; Movie Central (defunct); Myx; O Shopping (defunct); Yey! (defunct)

History
- Launched: July 30, 2018
- Closed: June 30, 2020 (broadcast franchise lapsed/expired)
- Replaced by: All TV (UHF 16 Manila channel space); SMNI News Channel (UHF 43 Manila channel space)

Asianovela Channel was a Philippine free-to-air television network owned and operated by ABS-CBN Corporation. It was one of the former digital channels of ABS-CBN TV Plus. Its programming consisted of Korean dramas and other Asian films dubbed in Filipino. The channel was launched on July 30, 2018.

On June 1, 2020, Asianovela Channel replaced the channel space of ABS-CBN Sports and Action. On June 30, 2020, the network ceased broadcasting permanently due to the alias cease-and-desist order (ACDO) issued by the National Telecommunications Commission (NTC) and Solicitor General Jose Calida. On September 10, 2020, the frequency for Asianovela Channel (from channel 16 and 43) was recalled by the NTC. In January 2022, the former temporary frequency for Asianovela Channel on UHF 43 was awarded to Apollo Quiboloy's Sonshine Media Network International (SMNI) until its 30-day suspension on December 19, 2023, whereas, on the same time, the former original frequency for Asianovela Channel on UHF 16 was awarded to Advanced Media Broadcasting System (AMBS) which is being used as the basis of its network, All TV, where it be later resuming the broadcast of several former Asianovela Channel programs since January 2, 2026.
