= ABS-CBN Sports =

Philippine sports programming division of ABS-CBN (1998)

- Launched: 1998; 28 years ago
- Closed: August 31, 2020; 6 years ago (broadcast franchise lapsed/expired with most of assets were acquired by TAP DMV)
- Division of: ABS-CBN Narrowcast
- Country of origin: Philippines
- Owner: ABS-CBN Corporation
- Key people: March Ventosa (Head, ABS-CBN Narrowcast); Dino Laurena, (Head, ABS-CBN Integrated Sports); Peter Musñgi, (Consultant, ABS-CBN Integrated Sports)
- Headquarters: Quezon City
- Major broadcasting contracts: MPBL; ABL
- Sister network: ABS-CBN; ABS-CBN HD; S+A; S+A HD; Liga
- Format: Sports
- Original languages: Filipino (main); English (secondary)

ABS-CBN Sports was a sports division of the Philippine media conglomerate ABS-CBN Corporation, which aired some of the notable sporting events in the Philippines.

ABS-CBN Sports began in 1998 as the main broadcaster for the network-backed basketball league Metropolitan Basketball Association which introduced the home-and-away play format in the Philippine basketball landscape. Simultaneous with that (shortly before the MBA collapsed), it acquired the broadcast rights to the University Athletic Association of the Philippines (UAAP) and National Collegiate Athletic Association (Philippines) (NCAA) collegiate basketball leagues, which bolstered Studio 23's ratings and at the same time aligned further toward the said channel's programming thrust to the youth.

ABS-CBN Sports also supplant contents to their sports channel Studio 23/S+A aired on UHF Channel 23 (main channel) and Sky Cable Channel 166 (HD channel). The division also maintains their official website, sports.abs-cbn.com, one of the top sports news websites in the Philippines.

On July 16, 2020, the final buzzer sounded as the staff and employees of the sports division became part of a series of retrenchments, following the July 10 vote of the House Committee on Legislative Franchises denied the network a congressional franchise, officially ceased its operations on August 31.

Following the closure, several sports rights were transferred to the different TV channels (including TAP Sports and Premier Sports, both owned by TAP Digital Media Ventures Corporation). Despite the closure, ABS-CBN Sports continued to deliver sports update on digital platforms.

== Final programs ==
=== Exclusive contract ===
Note: Titles are listed in alphabetical order followed by the year it debuted in parentheses.

- 2001 SEABA Championship
- 2009 FIFA Confederations Cup
- 2010 AFF Suzuki Cup
- 2011 Southeast Asian Games
- 2010 FIFA World Cup
- 2013 FIFA Confederations Cup
- 2013 Southeast Asian Games
- 2014 AFF Suzuki Cup
- 2014 FIFA World Cup
- 2014 FIBA Basketball World Cup
- 2019 Southeast Asian Games
- ALA Promotions Bouts (Pinoy Pride) (2009–2019)
- ASEAN Basketball League (2016–2020)
- ASEAN Football Federation (official broadcaster for the Philippines) (2011–2016)
- Asian Football Confederation (official broadcaster for the Philippines) (2011–2014)
- Bakbakan (2008–2009)
- Beach Volleyball Republic (2016–2019)
- Bellator MMA (2016–2019)
- Brazilian League (2011–2015)
- FIFA (2009–2019) (official broadcaster for the Philippines; now with TAP Digital Media Ventures Corporation)
- Filoil Flying V Preseason Premier Cup (2006–2017)
- FIVB (official broadcaster for the Philippines) (2016–2018)
- Game Na!
- Gameplan
- Gametime (2017–2020)
- Hardball (2006–2020)
- International Premier Tennis League (2014) (official broadcaster for the Philippine Mavericks)
- J.League Highlights (2014)
- La Liga (2017–2019)
- Ligue 1 (2018–2019)
- Maharlika Pilipinas Basketball League (2018–2020; now with Solar Sports)
- Man-Up
- Manny Pacquiao fights on ABS-CBN (produced by Solar Entertainment Corporation) (2006–2019)
- MBA Games (1998–2001)
- National Basketball Association (2011–2019; now with One Sports/Cignal TV, ESPN-Disney+ and Prime Video)
- National Collegiate Athletic Association (2002–2011, 2015–2020; now with One Sports/Cignal TV)
- National Football League (1996–2000; now with TAP Digital Media Ventures Corporation and DAZN)
- NBA Action (2014–2019)
- NBA Inside Stuff (2014–2019)
- ONE Championship (2016–2020; now with One Sports/Cignal TV)
- Palarong Pambansa (2016–2018)
- Philippine Basketball League Games (2003–2007)
- Philippine Collegiate Champions League (2009–2017)
- Philippines National Football Team Games (2010–2014)
- Philippines Women's National Football Team Games (2012–2014)
- Premier League (2017)
- Premier Volleyball League (2017–2020; now with One Sports/Cignal TV)
- Road to Johannesburg
- Shakey's V-League (2016–2017)
- Sports Report
- Sports TV
- Sports U (1997–2020)
- The 1st PBA DLSU vs. PBA ADMU Game
- The Score (2014–2020)
- Touchline
- UEFA (official broadcaster for the Philippines) (2016–2018)
- UEFA Champions League (2012–2014, 2017–2018)
- US Open (2007–2016) (official broadcaster for the Philippines)
- UFC Fight Night (2011–2015)
- Ultimate Fighting Championship (2005–2015; now with ESPN-Disney+)
- University Athletic Association of the Philippines (2000–2020; now with One Sports/Cignal TV)
- Universal Reality Combat Championship (2016–2018)
- Upfront at the UAAP
- Wild Card
- World Pool Championship 2007
- WWE (2010–2014; now with Netflix)
  - WWE NXT (2011–2014)
  - WWE Raw (2011–2014)
  - WWE Tough Enough (2014)
  - WWE Superstars (2010–2014)

== Sports broadcasters ==
=== Final on-air staff ===
- Dyan Castillejo (Sports Correspondent, Top Rank Boxing Play-by-play, Sports U host and ABS-CBN News sports reporter)
- Christian Luanzon (UAAP/MPBL Basketball Analyst)
- Leo Isaac (MPBL Basketball analyst)
- Bea Daez (UAAP Basketball analyst)
- Enzo Flojo (UAAP Basketball analyst)
- Judy Saril (PVL Courtside Reporter)
- Migs Gomez (MPBL Lead Play-by-play)
- TJ Manotoc (ABS-CBN News Sports Correspondent for North America)
- Miguel Dypiangco (MPBL lead play-by-play)
- Roxanne Montealegre (MPBL Courtside Reporter)
- Olsen Racela (NCAA Basketball analyst)
- Renren Ritualo (NCAA Basketball analyst)
- Rodney Santos (MPBL Basketball Analyst)
- Sheila Salaysay (MPBL Courtside reporter)
- Cedelf Tupas (MPBL Lead Play-by-play)
- Jeanine Tsoi (PVL Courtside reporter)
- Nikki Viola (MPBL Courtside reporter)
- Synjin Reyes (PVL Lead play-by-play or courtside reporter)
- K Realubit (MPBL Courtside reporter)
- Sydney Crespo (MPBL Courtside reporter)
- Aiyana Perlas (MPBL Courtside reporter)
- Nikko Ramos (UAAP Lead Play-by-play)
- Martin Antonio (MPBL Lead Play-by-play/NCAA Basketball Analyst)
- Migs Bustos (ANC Gametime anchor and UAAP/NCAA Basketball analyst)
- Marco Benitez (The Score substitute anchor and UAAP Basketball analyst)
- Vince Velasco (PVL Courtside Reporter)
- Jing Jamlang (UAAP/PVL Lead Play-by-play)

=== Past on-air staff ===
- Pia Arcangel
- Dominic Uy
- Dimples Romana
- Aaron Atayde
- Jinno Rufino
- Phoemela Baranda
- Tina Marasigan
- Cesca Litton
- George Rocha
- Akiko Thomson
- Edwin Khu
- Joel Banal
- Luigi Trillo
- Danny Francisco
- Butch Maniego†
- Joseph Barrios
- Lexi Schulze
- Rovilson Fernandez
- Carlo Ledesma
- Tricia Robredo
- Jessica Mendoza
- Myrtle Sarrosa
- Boom Labrusca
- Allan Gregorio
- Corrine Catibayan
- Vince Hizon
- Marc Nelson
- Riki Flores
- Ryan Gregorio
- Ira Pablo
- Laura Lehmann
- Pauline Verzosa
- Ganiel Krishnan
- Selina Dagdag
- Apple David
- Anthony Suntay
- Tricia Chiongbian
- Bobby Yan
- Randy Sacdalan
- Chot Reyes
- Pia Gonzales
- JC Gonzales
- Ira Panganiban
- Ria Tanjuatco-Trillo
- Alex Santos
- Sev Sarmenta
- Gretchen Ho
- Mico Halili
- Benjie Paras
- Ronnie Magsanoc
- Freddie Webb
- Dondon Hontiveros
- Boyet Sison†
- Bill Velasco
- Gretchen Fullido
- Jude Turcuato
- Denice Dinsay
- Boom Gonzalez
- Martin Javier
- Eric Tipan
- Anton Roxas
- Alex Compton
- Kirk Long

== See also ==
- ABS-CBN News and Current Affairs
- Liga
- Studio 23
- S+A
