= Movie Central (Philippines) =

Defunct Digital television channel in the Philippines

- Country: Philippines
- Broadcast area: Defunct
- Network: ABS-CBN
- Headquarters: ABS-CBN Broadcasting Center, Diliman, Quezon City, Philippines (for ABS-CBN)

Programming
- Picture format: 480i (SDTV)

Ownership
- Owner: ABS-CBN Corporation
- Sister channels: Asianovela Channel; Cine Mo!; DZMM TeleRadyo; Jeepney TV; Knowledge Channel; Myx; O Shopping (defunct); Yey! (defunct)

History
- Founded: July 30, 2018; 8 years ago
- Launched: July 30, 2018; 8 years ago (ABS-CBN TVplus); June 14, 2020; 6 years ago (cable programming block for Kapamilya Channel)
- Closed: May 5, 2020; 6 years ago (broadcast franchise lapsed/expired)
- Replaced by: All TV (UHF 16 Manila channel space)

Movie Central was a Philippine pay television channel created by ABS-CBN and one of the freemium channels of ABS-CBN TV Plus. The channel's programming consists of mainly foreign and Hollywood movies. It was the second digital terrestrial television-exclusive movie channel after Cine Mo!, which also airs Hollywood and foreign movies in original English audio. Movie Central operated daily from 7:00 AM to 1:00 AM of the following day. It was available for a free-trial basis from July 30, 2018, to May 5, 2020, alongside O Shopping (standalone DTV), Asianovela Channel, Jeepney TV, and Myx.

Movie Central permanently ceased broadcasting as a standalone digital premium channel on May 5, 2020, due to the cease-and-desist order issued by the National Telecommunications Commission (NTC) and Solicitor General Jose Calida against ABS-CBN. On September 10, 2020, the NTC recalled all frequencies assigned to ABS-CBN.

Most of the films aired on Movie Central were moved to Kapamilya Channel via Movie Central Presents movie block, which airs during late-night hours, exclusive to pay cable and satellite television, replacing O Shopping. It began its simulcast on All TV on January 2, 2026, until 2:00AM of the following day, thus marking its partial return to both free-to-air television and especially digital channel 16 in Mega Manila and regional channels previously held by ABS-CBN after almost 6 years, with The Commuter being the first film to air on the same night. Its simulcast on All TV quietly ended on February 16, 2026.

== Final programming ==
=== Content ===
Movie Central carried films from various Hollywood film studios (Walt Disney Studios, 20th Century Studios, Warner Bros. Pictures, Paramount Pictures, Skydance Media, Columbia Pictures, Universal Pictures, Lionsgate Films, Metro-Goldwyn-Mayer and selected independent film studios).

=== Programming blocks ===
- Action Zone – a weekday early-evening showcase of mostly action films.
- Date Night – a programming block dedicated primarily to romantic films.
- Hit Play Now – blockbuster movies from various genres are presented.
- Thriller Theater – a late-night programming block featuring mostly horror and suspense movies.
- Movie Blowout – a Saturday night block showcasing well-loved blockbuster movies.
- Sunday Double Rumble – a Sunday night block featuring two movies of the same genre.
- The Rundown - a documentary block featuring two movies of the same genre, airing back-to-back every Monday night.
