= ABS-CBN Sports and Action =

Defunct Philippine free-to-air television network

- Type: Free-to-air television network
- Country: Philippines
- Broadcast area: Defunct
- Network: AMCARA Broadcasting Network (2014–2020)
- Stations: List of stations
- Headquarters: ABS-CBN Broadcasting Center, Mother Ignacia Street, corner Sgt. Esguerra Avenue, Diliman, Quezon City

Programming
- Languages: Filipino (main); English (secondary)
- Picture format: 480i (SDTV); 1080i (HDTV)

Ownership
- Owner: ABS-CBN Corporation
- Key people: March Ventosa (Head, ABS-CBN Narrowcast); Dino Laurena (Head, ABS-CBN Sports); Vince Rodriguez (Channel Head, S+A and Production Head); Engr. Bernardo M. Acosta, (Vice President for Technical Operations)
- Sister channels: ABS-CBN (former); Liga (defunct)

History
- Founded: January 18, 2014
- Launched: January 18, 2014 (terrestrial); July 10 2015 (international); January 1, 2016 (high-definition)
- Replaced: Studio 23 (1996–2014); Balls (2008–2015; cable/HD channel)
- Closed: May 5, 2020 (broadcast franchise lapsed/expired); December 2, 2020 (international) (6 years, 10 months and 14 days)
- Replaced by: Asianovela Channel (TV Plus channel space); Liga (Cable / Satellite); Aliw Channel 23 (UHF channel 23 space)

Sports+Action
- Country: United States
- Network: S+A
- Headquarters: Daly City, California

Programming
- Languages: Filipino (main); English (secondary)

Ownership
- Owner: ABS-CBN Corporation
- Sister channels: Cinema One; Myx TV; The Filipino Channel

History
- Launched: July 10, 2015
- Closed: December 2, 2020
- Replaced by: Cine Mo! Global
- Former names: Pinoy Central TV (2002–2007); Kapamilya Channel (2007–2011); Bro (2011–2015)

ABS-CBN Sports and Action (stylized as ABS-CBN Sports+Action), also known as simply (from 2016) S+A (pronounced S and A), was a Philippine free-to-air broadcast television network based in Quezon City. It was owned by ABS-CBN Corporation with some of its programs produced and licensed by ABS-CBN Sports. In Metro Manila, Sports+Action broadcast terrestrially and through DTT through DWAC-TV (UHF channel 23), the frequency once used by the defunct national television network Studio 23 until its closure on January 17, 2014, with most of its UHF affiliate stations in the provinces owned by AMCARA Broadcasting Network. It began its operations on January 18, 2014, yet it did not become the company's sole channel for sports until the shutdown of subscription-based counterpart Balls by the end of 2015. Its simulcast high-definition channel was exclusively available on Sky Cable, Destiny Cable and Sky Direct since 2016, while its international feed (carried with the same channel name) carried worldwide through The Filipino Channel. Sports + Action's programming is composed primarily of sports coverage such as MPBL, ABL, UAAP, NCAA, Pinoy Pride fights, BVR, PVL and ONE Championship. The program line up of Sports + Action included other sports-related programming, news coverages and blocktimers. S+A broadcast Mondays to Saturdays from 5:00 am to 1:00 am and Sundays from 4:00 am to 1:00 am.

On May 5, 2020, the station's broadcasting activities, together with that of its sister television and radio stations ABS-CBN, DZMM, and MOR Philippines, were ordered to sign off the air at 7:52 pm following the cease-and-desist order (CDO) issued by the National Telecommunications Commission due to the expiration of ABS-CBN's legislative license to operate. S+A continued to air internationally through The Filipino Channel until December 2.

On January 5, 2022, its former UHF frequencies (channel 23 and 43) were assigned by the NTC to RPN's sister company Aliw Broadcasting Corporation (for channel 23) and Swara Sug Media Corporation (for channel 43). However, SSMC ceased operations on December 21, 2023, following NTC's suspension order, and subsequently a cease and desist order.

== History ==
According to ABS-CBN Narrowcast Head March Ventosa, the division started developing the concept of a sports channel of free television for a year. Also with its launching, the management decided to drop the strong Studio 23 branding for it is well associated with entertainment programs of which the former channel only carries 30 percent of sports related content.

=== Launching ===
The channel was officially launched in Glorietta 3, Ayala Center, Makati on January 17, 2014. The event was attended by several well known Filipino athletes including Marlon Stockinger, Donnie Nietes, the Philippines national football team, Jeron Teng, and some ABS-CBN executives and personalities. The event also provided a glimpse of its program lineup which includes sports coverage of UAAP, Top Rank and Pinoy Pride boxing bouts, and the Philippines national football team matches.

A test broadcast was done a day prior to its official launching on January 18, 2014.

The network's newest Station ID featuring the dedication and spirit of the Filipino athletes was launched during It's Showtime in 2014. The song "Ito ang Ating Sandali", composed and performed by former Rivermaya vocalist Rico Blanco was used for the station identification.

=== International feed ===
ABS-CBN Sports+Action was launched internationally in June 2015 via TFC, as the replacement of the BRO channel, the channel broadcast several sports coverages, programs which also aired on Channel 23 and carry-up shows including leisure, comedy and action-packed movies.

=== High-definition channel ===
On January 1, 2016, the channel launched its own high-definition feed (formerly known as Balls HD) on Sky Cable and Destiny Cable. Its program line-up included HD sports coverages of the UAAP, NCAA, Pinoy Pride, US Open, UEFA and FIVB matches. Unlike ABS-CBN HD, which was an HD simulcast feed from ABS-CBN, ABS-CBN Sports+Action HD initially was a separate channel from S+A which aired exclusive live events and other programs.

In April 2017, S+A HD converted into an HD feed simulcast channel of S+A Channel 23, similar to ABS-CBN HD.

=== 2016 relaunch ===
On August 29, 2016, in time with the National Heroes Day celebration, S+A debuted its new logo and station ID campaign entitled "Sumasaludo sa Pusong Palaban ng Lahing Pilipino" or "Salute to the Defiant Heart of Filipino Generation", in line with the network's continuous advocacy on promoting sports development and supporting the Filipino athletes and sporting teams that made pride and glory to the Filipino sporting community and its values and hardwork. The song "Tibay", performed by singer/songwriter Quest, was used in the station ID, which featured athletes from the sports coverages covered by ABS-CBN Sports+Action, such as UAAP, NCAA, boxing and MMA events.

Beginning August 2018, S+A began to broadcast 24 hours of sports coverage a day similar to the national ABS-CBN, in which however, only for selected sports programs that aired on early mornings.

=== 2020 franchise renewal issue ===
On May 5, 2020, the National Telecommunications Commission issued a cease and desist order against ABS-CBN Corporation, forcing all of its television stations, including S+A, to stop their operations immediately due to the expiration of its legislative franchise. But some S+A programs were moved through its cable and satellite channel Liga as ad interim.

TV Patrol's special episode dedicated to the cease-and-desist order of ABS-CBN's free TV and radio stations was the final show to be aired on S+A before the network signed off indefinitely.

=== S+A Global closure ===
After five years, S+A Global ceased its broadcast operations internationally through The Filipino Channel on December 2, 2020, due to implementation of a retrenchment program covering its business company from August 7, following the House of Representatives' 70–11 vote denying the company a fresh congressional franchise on July 10 and the dissolution of ABS-CBN Sports to close its business effective August 31, 2020.

== Programming ==
According to Sports Interactive Network, S+A's programming line-up comprised by 70 percent of its contents will be about sports, with the remaining of it covering Filipino action films, news updates, and other entertainment, informative & religious programs such as blocktimers. Several programming of the now-defunct Balls channel (which ended transmission on December 31, 2015) were absorbed by S+A. However, all movie blocks, news updates and other action-related programs including US drama series were phased out in April 2017 in favor of additional sports coverages.

== Analog television stations (defunct) ==
Callsign	Channel	Transmitter location
DWAC	23	Quezon City
DWLC	23	San Nicolas, Ilocos Norte
DWWA	23	Santiago, Isabela
DWEC	30	Mt. Santo Tomas, Benguet
DWAM	23	Botolan
DWAS	24	Olongapo
DWJR	36	Mt. Banoy, Batangas
DZEL	23	Puerto Princesa
DWBR	24	Naga, Camarines Sur
DWMC	23	Legazpi, Albay
DYCG	23	Kalibo
DYAJ	38	Iloilo City
DYEC	22	Bacolod
DYAC	23	Cebu City
DYAD	40	Jagna
DYEL	24	Valencia, Negros Oriental
DYTC	24	Tacloban
DXFH	23	Zamboanga City
DXCS	4	Cagayan de Oro
DXAM	26	Iligan
—N/a	23	Surigao City
DXBR	22	Butuan
DXAB	21	Davao City
DXAC	36	General Santos
DXAY	23	Cotabato City

== See also ==
- ABS-CBN Corporation
- ABS-CBN Sports
- ABS-CBN News and Current Affairs
- AMCARA Broadcasting Network
- Liga
- One Sports
- Solar Sports
- TAP Sports
- Blast Sports
