= Jeepney TV =

Filipino cable television channel

- Logo used since November 27, 2015
- Country: Philippines
- Network: ABS-CBN
- Affiliates: All TV (2024–2026)
- Headquarters: ABS-CBN Broadcasting Center, Diliman, Quezon City, Metro Manila, Philippines

Programming
- Language: Filipino
- Picture format: 1080i (HDTV) (downscaled to 16:9 480i for the SDTV feed)

Ownership
- Owner: ABS-CBN Corporation
- Parent: Creative Programs, Inc.
- Sister channels: A2Z (via ZOE TV); All TV (via AMBS); ANC; Cine Mo!; Cinema One; Kapamilya Channel; Knowledge Channel; Metro Channel; Myx; DZMM Radyo Patrol 630; DZMM TeleRadyo; TFC; Favorite Music Radio

History
- Launched: October 22, 2012; 13 years ago
- Replaced: CgeTV; ABS-CBN (TV Plus Channel Space) (ad interim); Fox Filipino (Cignal channel space)
- Replaced by: All TV (UHF 16 Manila channel space)

Links
- Website: Jeepney TV on Facebook

Availability

Terrestrial
- SkyCable (Metro Manila): Channel 9
- SkyTV (Metro Manila): Channel 120
- SkyCable (Provincial): Channel 610
- Cablelink (Metro Manila): Channel 9
- Cignal TV (Nationwide): Channel 44
- SatLite (Nationwide): Channel 37
- G Sat (Nationwide): Channel 55
- Converge Vision (Metro Manila): Channel 14
- Sinag Cable (Rizal): Channel 9
- Royal Cable (Laguna): Channel 705

Streaming media
- Kapamilya Online Live (selected programs only): Facebook; YouTube
- Comclark: Watch Live

Jeepney TV is a Philippine pay television channel owned and operated by Creative Programs, a subsidiary of ABS-CBN Corporation. Its programming features classic television programs produced by ABS-CBN, as well as extended versions of some with scenes that were not originally aired on the main network. The channel was named after the jeepney, a vehicle widely used for public transportation in the Philippines.

A video-on-demand service for Jeepney TV programs is also available worldwide via iWant and TFC IPTV.

== History ==
Jeepney TV was launched on October 22, 2012, in preparation for the 60th anniversary of its parent network, ABS-CBN, the following year.

In 2015, the channel revamped its graphics and program lineup, and its programming schedule was overhauled.

On March 11, 2018, Jeepney TV featured the Hero Zone (a former anime programming block of ABS-CBN in 2006) as a two-hour weekend morning anime block, beginning with Yu-Gi-Oh! Arc-V and KonoSuba. The block was later discontinued on July 22, 2018 order to focus more on local programming.

From July 30, 2018 to May 5, 2020, Jeepney TV was available as a digital channel for ABS-CBN TV Plus. On June 1, 2020, Jeepney TV returned broadcasting, replacing ABS-CBN on its channel space on ABS-CBN TV Plus. It later ceased broadcasting on June 30, 2020, due to the alias cease-and-desist order against ABS-CBN TV Plus.

On August 1, 2020, Jeepney TV began livestreaming some of its contents on the online video-sharing platforms Facebook and YouTube as part of Kapamilya Online Live. The channel also became available on G Sat Channel 55 on October 5, 2020; SatLite Channel 37 on November 19, 2020; Cignal Channel 44 on January 4, 2021; and Cablelink Channel 9 on February 15, 2024.

On April 15, 2024, some Jeepney TV programs began broadcasting on free-to-air television through All TV as part of the Jeepney TV sa All TV programming block, following a brand licensing signed between ABS-CBN and AMBS. The official launch of this programming block commenced on May 13, 2024, along with a simulcast of Kapamilya Channel broadcast feed, marking ABS-CBN's return to former channel frequencies after four years. Kapamilya Channel then extended its airtime on January 2, 2026 which ended the Jeepney TV block on All TV after a year and eight months. The latter channel continued broadcasting on cable, satellite providers and live streaming service on iWant.

On September 30, 2025, the channel migrated to the 16:9 anamorphic widescreen format. The change allowed for a widescreen presentation, optimizing the viewing experience for viewers with compatible widescreen televisions.
