= Lifestyle (Philippine TV channel) =

Defunct Filipino cable television network

Lifestyle Network
- Country: Philippines
- Headquarters: ABS-CBN Broadcasting Center, Diliman, Quezon City, Philippines

Programming
- Language: English
- Picture format: 480i SDTV

History
- Launched: July 24, 1999
- Replaced: I Channel
- Closed: April 1, 2018 (Philippines); November 30, 2020 (North America)
- Replaced by: Metro Channel (Philippines); ANC Global (North America)

Links
- Website: lifestylenetwork.tv (North America)

Lifestyle Network (known in the Philippines from 2015 to 2018 as simply Lifestyle), was a global Filipino pay TV channel based in Quezon City. It was owned and operated by Creative Programs, a subsidiary of the media conglomerate ABS-CBN Corporation. Its programming was composed primarily of lifestyle and entertainment shows targeted to upscale Filipino women in the Filipino diaspora with most imported programming sourced from the former Scripps Networks Interactive channels, Food Network, HGTV and Trvl Channel (all are now under Warner Bros. Discovery).

On April 2, 2018, the domestic version of Lifestyle Network was relaunched as Metro Channel. However, the North American version of Lifestyle Network continued to be distributed in the United States and Canada until November 30, 2020. After which, programs that formerly aired on the international channel were transferred to ANC Global.

== Programs ==
Final logo used by the domestic version of Lifestyle Network from May 2015 until April 1, 2018, when it was renamed to Metro Channel on the latter date.
