= Cinema One =

Philippine pay television network

- "Laging Kasama"
- Country: Philippines
- Broadcast area: Worldwide
- Headquarters: ABS-CBN Broadcasting Center, Diliman, Quezon City

Programming
- Languages: Filipino; English
- Picture format: 16:9 1080i HDTV

Ownership
- Owner: ABS-CBN Corporation
- Parent: Creative Programs Inc.
- Sister channels: Under ABS-CBN; A2Z (via ZOE TV); ALLTV (via AMBS); ANC; Cine Mo! Jeepney TV; Kapamilya Channel; Knowledge Channel; Metro Channel; Myx; Myx (America); DZMM Radyo Patrol 630; DZMM TeleRadyo; TFC

History
- Launched: June 12, 1994; 32 years ago
- Former names: Classic 21 (1992–1994); Sky 1 (1994–1998); Pinoy Blockbuster Channel (1998–2001)

Links
- Website: cinemaone.abs-cbn.com

Availability

Terrestrial
- SkyTV Metro Manila: Channel 92
- Cignal TV Nationwide: Channel 45
- SatLite Nationwide: Channel 34
- SatLite Digital Nationwide: Channel 36
- G Sat Nationwide: Channel 47

Streaming media
- iWant (outside Philippines only; requires premium subscription)

Cinema One (also called C1 and stylized as C1NEMAONE) is a Philippine pay television channel targeted to the Filipino diaspora. It is owned by Creative Programs Inc., a subsidiary of Philippine media conglomerate ABS-CBN Corporation. Its programming includes a lineup of mainstream and independent local and foreign films distributed by ABS-CBN Studios/Star Cinema, GMA Pictures, Cignal Entertainment, Unitel Pictures, Solar Pictures, APT Entertainment, The IdeaFirst Company, Brightlight Productions, Regal Entertainment (Regal Films) and rarely, OctoArts Films (films solely produced by Viva Films air on PBO and Viva Cinema), film-related programming, and original films. An international feed called Cinema One Global is also available worldwide as part of TFC premium channels via cable, satellite, iWant and TFC IPTV.

== History ==
The channel was launched on June 12, 1994, when i-Channel merged with Classic 21 to form Sky 1, launching morning schedules containing public affairs, business, music and mostly Philippine movies. Later, public affairs and business programs were removed from Sky 1 programming and, from there, would form cable news channel Sarimanok News Network (now ABS-CBN News Channel); and Sky 1 was rebranded as the Pinoy Blockbuster Channel on April 18, 1998, with its programming now focused solely on locally-produced films.

On May 20, 2001, Pinoy Blockbuster Channel was rebranded again as Cinema One and added foreign movies to its schedule. In this move, Cinema One received its current name as suggested by former ABS-CBN president and COO Federico M. Garcia; the rebrand to Cinema One also reflected the channel’s repositioning to cater to other markets, such as the premium A and B social classes.

As part of the relaunch, the movie channel also launched weekly original programs to complement the movie blocks, including Cinema News, Persona,’ Cover Story, and Review Night.

In May 2004, as part of ABS-CBN's global marketing strategy, Cinema One was launched internationally focused towards the Philippine diaspora in North America, the Middle East, Europe, and Asia-Pacific.

In 2005, Cinema One ventured into original movie production under its annual Cinema One Originals film festival which showcase and grants funding to independent film makers in the country. Among the films that has been produced by the channel were Confessional (2007), Huling Balyan ng Buhi, Rome & Juliet, Tambolista (2007), Mater Dolorosa (2012), Yanggaw, Sa North Diversion Road (2005), Imburnal (2008), Dose, Altar, Baybayin (2012), That Thing Called Tadhana (2014), Ang Babaeng Humayo, 2 Cool 2 Be 4gotten, and Baka Bukas.

Cinema One logo from February 1, 2009 to April 16, 2013

In 2015, the channel started producing content in the scripted content genre and aired the mini-series ‘Single/Single’ starring Shaina Magdayao and Matteo Guidicelli.

In July 2021, through a strong partnership between ABS-CBN and MediaQuest Holdings through TV5 Network and Cignal TV, Cinema One was added to Cignal's channel lineup with its sister channel Myx as free trial channels and later as "add-ons" for lower plans.

On June 27, 2022, the channel migrated to the 16:9 anamorphic widescreen format. The change allowed for a widescreen presentation, optimizing the viewing experience for viewers with compatible widescreen televisions.

== Cinema One Premium HD ==
Cinema One Premium HD was a short-lived premium channel which showed local films in full high-definition.

== See also ==
- Cine Mo! (sister channel)
- Pinoy Box Office - channel that airs movies by Viva Films with no involvement from Star Cinema
- I Heart Movies
- Viva Cinema
- SolarFlix
- Global Pinoy Cinema (defunct)
