= Cine Mo! =

- Hari Ka Rito!
- Country: Philippines
- Broadcast area: Nationwide (via cable and satellite); Worldwide (via iWant and TFC)
- Network: ABS-CBN
- Headquarters: Quezon City, Philippines

Programming
- Language: Filipino
- Picture format: 16:9 1080i HDTV

Ownership
- Owner: ABS-CBN Corporation
- Sister channels: Under ABS-CBN; A2Z (via ZOE TV); All TV (via AMBS); ANC; Cinema One; Jeepney TV; Kapamilya Channel; Knowledge Channel; Metro Channel; Myx; Myx (America); DZMM Radyo Patrol 630 (via PCMC); DZMM TeleRadyo; TFC; Favorite Music Radio

History
- Founded: 2003
- Launched: 2003 (as SineBox); 2011 (as Cine Mo!); 2015 (ABS-CBN TV Plus)
- Replaced: Zee Sine (Cignal channel space); Liga (cable channel space); O Shopping (Cignal channel space); RPTV (Cablelink channel space)
- Replaced by: SMNI News Channel (UHF 43 Manila channel space)
- Former names: SineBox (2003–2011)

Availability

Terrestrial
- SkyCable Metro Manila: Channel 7
- SkyTV Metro Manila: Channel 93
- Cignal TV Nationwide: Channel 43
- SatLite Nationwide: Channel 36
- G Sat Nationwide: Channel 46

Streaming media
- iWant: Watch Live

Cine Mo! (lit. 'your movie'; visually rendered in all capital letters as CINE MO!) is a Philippine pay television channel owned and operated by ABS-CBN Corporation. It was one of the former freemium channels of ABS-CBN TVplus. It was the complement to its English-language counterpart, Movie Central, until its shutdown in June 2020. The channel's programming consists of local films and foreign movies, and operates 24/7 since March 2021, while the channel began broadcasting in anamorphic 16:9 aspect ratio since September 2025. The change allowed for a widescreen presentation, optimizing the viewing experience for viewers with compatible widescreen televisions. The channel is derived from the Spanish word "Cine" and the Filipino word "Mo" and it is a pun on "Cinema".

== Programming ==
=== Current ===
- Tayong Dalawa (re-run)
- Galema: Anak ni Zuma (re-run)
- Sigabo (Marathon)

== Cine Mo! Global ==
An international feed called Cine Mo! Global is also available worldwide as part of TFC premium channels via cable, satellite, iWant and TFC IPTV.

== See also ==
- ABS-CBN Corporation
- ABS-CBN
- Cinema One
- SolarFlix
- I Heart Movies
- Kapamilya Channel
- The Filipino Channel
- Pinoy Box Office
- Viva Cinema
