= IBC 13 =

IBC 13 may refer to:

- Intercontinental Broadcasting Corporation, a Philippine television network owned by Government Communications Group
- Four IBC's regional stations broadcasting on channel 13, including:
  - DZTV-TV in Metro Manila
  - DXWW-TV in Davao
