= Broadcast City =

Coordinates: 14.664765°N 121.077543°E

General information
- Type: Radio studio Television studio
- Location: Capitol Hills, Old Balara, Quezon City, Philippines
- Construction started: 1970; 56 years ago
- Completed: 1976; 50 years ago
- Inaugurated: July 1978; 48 years ago
- Renovated: 2013; 13 years ago
- Demolished: 2020; 6 years ago
- Owner: Roberto Benedicto (1978-1986); Government of the Philippines (1986-2018)

Broadcast City was the headquarters and broadcast complex of the television and radio networks owned by Roberto Benedicto, namely - Banahaw Broadcasting Corporation (BBC), Radio Philippines Network (RPN) and Intercontinental Broadcasting Corporation (IBC). It was located at Capitol Hills, Old Balara, Diliman, Quezon City and served as the three network's main television and radio production center and main transmission facility. It was inaugurated in July 1978 and was the most modern broadcast facility at that time.

After the 1986 People Power Revolution toppled the government of Ferdinand Marcos, Broadcast City and the three networks were sequestered by the new government and placed under the management of a Board of Administrators tasked to operate and manage its business and affairs subject to the control and supervision of Presidential Commission on Good Government (PCGG).

BBC ended its operations on March 20, 1986, and its radio (101.9 FM) and television frequencies and one frequency from RPN (630 AM) were awarded back to ABS-CBN in July 1986.

In 2011, RPN and IBC entered into a joint venture agreement with Prime Realty, an affiliate of R-II Builders Group of Reghis Romero Jr. The agreement called for the development of 3.5 hectares of Broadcast City.

In October 2012, RPN's news and sales department were disbanded by Solar TV Network (which acquired a 34% controlling stake in the network since 2011) and discontinued use of the Broadcast City facilities in favor of its modern facilities in Mandaluyong.

IBC has discontinued the use of Broadcast City since December 2018. Broadcast City was demolished in 2020 to give way for the Larossa Condominium project of Primehomes Real Estate Development Inc.

== Television and radio stations located in Broadcast City ==
BBC/City 2

- DWWX-TV 2 - Frequency returned to ABS-CBN Corporation in 1986 as ABS-CBN until 2020. Now known as All TV (DZMV-TV).
- DWWA 1160/DWAN 1206 - Frequency was operated by IBC from 1986 to 2004, later managed by the MMDA until it went defunct in 2010, and eventually revived by IBC in 2024.
- DWWK/DWOK-FM 101.9 - Frequency returned to ABS-CBN Corporation in 1986. Now defunct since 2020 as DWRR-FM due to expired broadcast franchise with its frequency and broadcast stations being acquired and used by Anchor Radio 101.9 in San Pedro, Laguna.

RPN

- DZKB-TV 9
- DWWW 630 - Frequency returned to ABS-CBN Corporation in 1986 as DZMM until 2020. In 2023, the station was allocated to PCMC as DWPM, and in 2025, it reverted its branding to DZMM under a joint venture between Prime Media Holdings and ABS-CBN.

IBC

- DZTV-TV 13
- DWKW 1280/DZTV-AM 1386 - Defunct in 1999.
- 89 DMZ (Danz Music Zone) - Sold in 2001 to Blockbuster Broadcasting System. Now known as AWR 89.1.

== See also ==
- Banahaw Broadcasting Corporation
- Radio Philippines Network
- Intercontinental Broadcasting Corporation
