= DWWX-TV =

Defunct Philippine television station of ABS-CBN

- Metro Manila; Philippines
- City: Quezon City
- Channels: Analog: 2 (VHF); Digital: 16/43 (UHF) (ISDB-T); Virtual: 1.01

Programming
- Affiliations: Silent

Ownership
- Owner: ABS-CBN Corporation (1953–1972; 1986–2020); Banahaw Broadcasting Corporation (1973–1986)
- Sister stations: DWAC-TV; DZMM Radyo Patrol 630 (now owned by PCMC); DWRR-FM

History
- First air date: October 23, 1953 (as ABS Channel 3); April 19, 1958 (as CBN Channel 9); November 4, 1973 (as BBC Channel 2); September 14, 1986 (as ABS-CBN Channel 2)
- Last air date: September 23, 1972 (martial law); May 5, 2020 (broadcast franchise lapsed/expired)
- Former call signs: DZAQ-TV (1953–1972); DZXL-TV (1958–October 14, 1969; November 14, 1969–1972)
- Former channel numbers: 3 (1953–1969); 9 (1958–1969); 4 (1969–1972)
- Former affiliations: ABS-CBN (1953–1972; 1986–2020); BBC/City2 (1973–1986)

Technical information
- Licensing authority: NTC

ABS-CBN channel 2 (1953-1972), (1986-2020)

DWWX-TV was the flagship VHF television station of the Philippine network ABS-CBN. The station was owned and operated by ABS-CBN Corporation, with its studio and transmitter located at the ABS-CBN Broadcasting Center on Sgt. Esguerra Avenue corner Mother Ignacia Avenue, Diliman, Quezon City, Metro Manila.

It was regarded as the first and oldest television station in the Philippines. The station served as the originating channel of the network's national programming, which was relayed to all its regional stations.

On May 5, 2020, the station's broadcasting operations, along with those of its sister television and radio stations, were effectively terminated following a cease-and-desist order issued by the National Telecommunications Commission (NTC), after the expiration of ABS-CBN's legislative franchise and its denial of renewal was decided with finality over two months later.

== History ==
=== Beginnings (1953–1972) ===
DZAQ-TV logo from 1952 to 1953

DWWX-TV traces its history to DZAQ-TV, the first Philippine television station, which was owned by the Bolinao Electronics Corporation (BEC). In 1949, James Lindenberg, owner of BEC, became the first applicant for a congressional franchise to establish a television station in the Philippines. His application was granted on June 14, 1950. However, due to strict import controls and the lack of raw materials needed to open a television station during that time, Lindenberg shifted his focus to radio broadcasting.

Judge Antonio Quirino, brother of then President Elpidio Quirino, also sought a license but was denied. He later acquired shares of stock in BEC, gained controlling interest, and renamed the company Alto Broadcasting System (ABS).

DZAQ-TV logo from 1953 to 1957

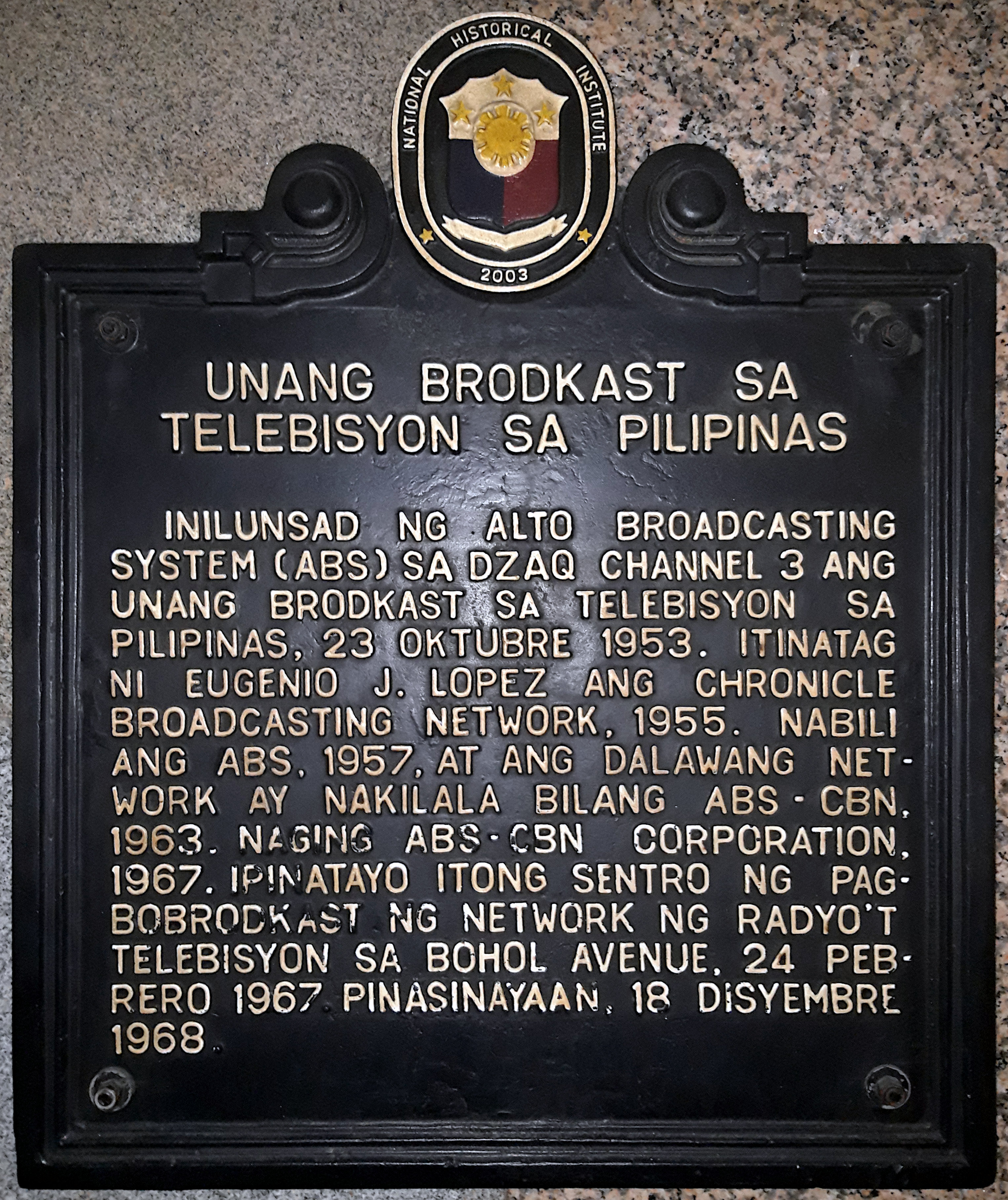
National historical marker installed in 2003 at the ABS-CBN Broadcast Center in Quezon City commemorating the first television broadcast by ABS

DZAQ-TV Channel 3 began commercial operations on October 23, 1953, becoming the first fully licensed commercial television station in the Philippines. Its inaugural program was a garden party at the Quirino residence in Sitio Alto, San Juan, Rizal Province (later Metro Manila in 1975). After the premiere telecast, the station followed a four-hour daily schedule from 6:00 p.m. to 10:00 p.m.

On June 16, 1955, Republic Act No. 1343, signed by President Ramon Magsaysay, granted the owners of the Manila Chronicle, Eugenio López, Sr. and former Vice President Fernando Lopez, a radio-television franchise. They subsequently established the Chronicle Broadcasting Network (CBN) on September 24, 1956, which initially focused on radio broadcasting. On February 24, 1957, López invited Judge Quirino to his house for breakfast, during which ABS was purchased under a contract reportedly written on a table napkin. Following the acquisition, the company temporarily reverted to the name Bolinao Electronics Corporation.

DZAQ-TV logo from 1957 to 1963

With the establishment of DZXL-TV Channel 9 on April 19 (or July), 1958, the López brothers gained control of both existing television channels in the Philippines. Plans were then made to construct a new network headquarters along Roxas Boulevard in Pasay, which was completed in the same year and became the official studios for Channels 3 and 9. The television monopoly was broken on March 1, 1960, when DZTV-TV Channel 13 was launched by the Inter-Island Broadcasting Corporation (now the Intercontinental Broadcasting Corporation, or IBC), then owned by Dick Baldwin.

By 1961, with the opening of its first regional station in Cebu, the ABS-CBN brand was officially used for the first time in newspaper advertisements promoting locally produced dramas such as Hiwaga sa Bahay na Bato and Mga Bayani sa Kalawakan.

In 1963, DZAQ-TV Channel 3 began experimental color broadcasts, and in 1966 ABS-CBN became the first Philippine television station to air selected shows in color.

On February 1, 1967, the company was renamed ABS-CBN Broadcasting Corporation, formalising the merger of DZAQ-TV Channel 3 and DZXL-TV Channel 9.

On December 18, 1968, ABS-CBN inaugurated the ABS-CBN Broadcast Center complex on Bohol Avenue, Quezon City. At the time of its completion, it was considered the most advanced broadcasting facility in Asia, second only to NHK in Japan.

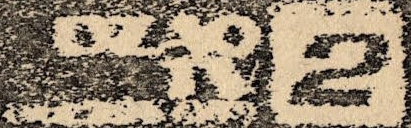
DZAQ-TV 2 logo from 1970 to 1972

On November 14, 1969, DZXL-TV moved from Channel 9 to Channel 4. On October 15, 1969, the Kanlaon Broadcasting System (KBS) (now the Radio Philippines Network) took over the Channel 9 frequency under the call sign DZKB-TV (KBS-9). On the same day, November 14, 1969, DZAQ-TV transferred from Channel 3 to Channel 2.

=== BBC (1973–1986) ===
BBC-2 logo used from 1978 to 1981

When President Ferdinand Marcos declared martial law under Proclamation No. 1081 on September 23, 1972, ABS-CBN was forced to shut down. Its stations were seized from the López family: DZAQ-TV Channel 2 was turned over to Roberto Benedicto and relaunched as DWWX-TV Channel 2 (BBC-2) under the Banahaw Broadcasting Corporation (BBC) on November 4, 1973, while DZXL-TV Channel 4 was turned over to the National Media Production Center (NMPC) and rebranded as GTV-4 on February 1, 1974.

The ABS-CBN Broadcast Center was renamed Broadcast Plaza on February 1, 1974, and became the home of BBC-2, KBS-9, and GTV-4. In 1978, BBC-2 and KBS-9 relocated to Benedicto's newly built Broadcast City complex, along with IBC-13 (originally based in San Juan), which was also under Benedicto's control. GTV-4 remained at Broadcast Plaza and was rebranded as Maharlika Broadcasting System (MBS-4) in 1980.

During the People Power Revolution in February 1986, as the Marcos government collapsed, reformist elements of the Armed Forces of the Philippines recognised the strategic importance of seizing the television facilities. Around 10:00 a.m. on February 24, 1986, they took control of Broadcast Plaza. Later that afternoon, MBS-4 resumed broadcasting under the interim name The New TV-4, with programming led by former ABS-CBN talents and newsreaders. It was officially rebranded as the People's Television Network (PTV) in April 1986.

On September 7, 1986, BBC-2 ceased operations after nearly 13 years on air.

=== Revival of ABS-CBN (1986–2020) ===
After the ouster of President Ferdinand Marcos, the networks owned by Roberto Benedicto—BBC, RPN and IBC—were sequestered by the newly established Presidential Commission on Good Government (PCGG). DWWX-TV Channel 2 and a portion of the Broadcast Center were returned to the López family, while DWGT-TV Channel 4 remained under government control.

On September 14, 1986, ABS-CBN officially resumed broadcasting after a seven-day test run, initially operating from what had been the main garage of the Broadcast Center. President Corazon Aquino together with ABS-CBN staff, oversaw the reopening of the network's facilities after the revolution. At the time, ABS-CBN had to share space with DWGT-TV Channel 4. Financial resources were limited, with makeshift offices doubling as dressing rooms and shortages of basic equipment such as chairs, tables and telephones. During its temporary stay at the Benpres Building in Pasig, the network consistently placed last among the five major television stations and incurred heavy losses. By early 1987, Eugenio "Geny" Lopez Jr. brought in former ABS-CBN executive Freddie Garcia, then with GMA Network, to lead the revival of the ailing station.

For its initial station identification, the numeral "2" was combined with the ABS-CBN logo. The design featured a wing-shaped blue crest with a white curve at the top and a white line forming a tail. The Broadway typeface "2" logo was used from 1986 to 1987. The network adopted the slogans "Watch Us Do It Again!" and "Sharing a New Life With You!" during this period.

On March 1, 1987, Channel 2 was relaunched with a live musical special, The Star Network: Ang Pagbabalik ng Bituin (The Return of the Star). The event introduced the white tri-ribbon Channel 2 logo, with a rhomboidal star at its center. From 1988 to 1992, the ribbons were coloured red, green and blue. This logo became the symbol of the network's resurgence. By 1988, ABS-CBN had regained the number one spot in television ratings, a position it held for the next 16 years.

On December 11, 1988, ABS-CBN launched nationwide satellite broadcasting with the airing of the Australian television miniseries A Dangerous Life. By 1994, the network had expanded its operations internationally. Channel 4 later vacated the Broadcast Center and moved to a new complex on Visayas Avenue, Quezon City, allowing ABS-CBN to regain full control of the facility on January 22, 1992.

On June 29, 1999, Eugenio López Jr. died of cancer in Hillsborough, California. That same year, Channel 2 launched its 120-kilowatt Millennium Transmitter, which significantly improved signal quality across Mega Manila.

In 2000, ABS-CBN introduced a new station ID, "Out of the Box, Into the New Millennium", featuring the ABS-CBN Millennium Overture composed by Ryan Cayabyab. The station ID highlighted the evolution of the network's past logos, culminating in the new design with a revised wordmark and a grey crystal-like square frame replacing the earlier black box.

In 2005, ABS-CBN increased its transmission power to 346.2 kilowatts (60 kW TPO), providing clearer reception throughout Metro Manila.

On February 11, 2015, ABS-CBN launched its digital terrestrial service via ISDB-T with the introduction of ABS-CBN TV Plus.

Beginning May 9, 2016, coinciding with the 2016 Philippine general election, ABS-CBN began 24-hour broadcasting with O Shopping as its overnight programming block. The network signed-off every Tuesday from 2:00 a.m. to 4:00 a.m. for transmitter maintenance, and annually during the Paschal Triduum of Holy Week from midnight to 6:00 a.m. for maintenance. However, following the suspension of O Shopping on April 21, 2020, amid the COVID-19 pandemic and the enforcement of enhanced community quarantine, ABS-CBN discontinued its round-the-clock operations and reverted to regular broadcast hours.

=== Cease and desist order and forced shutdown (2020–2022) ===
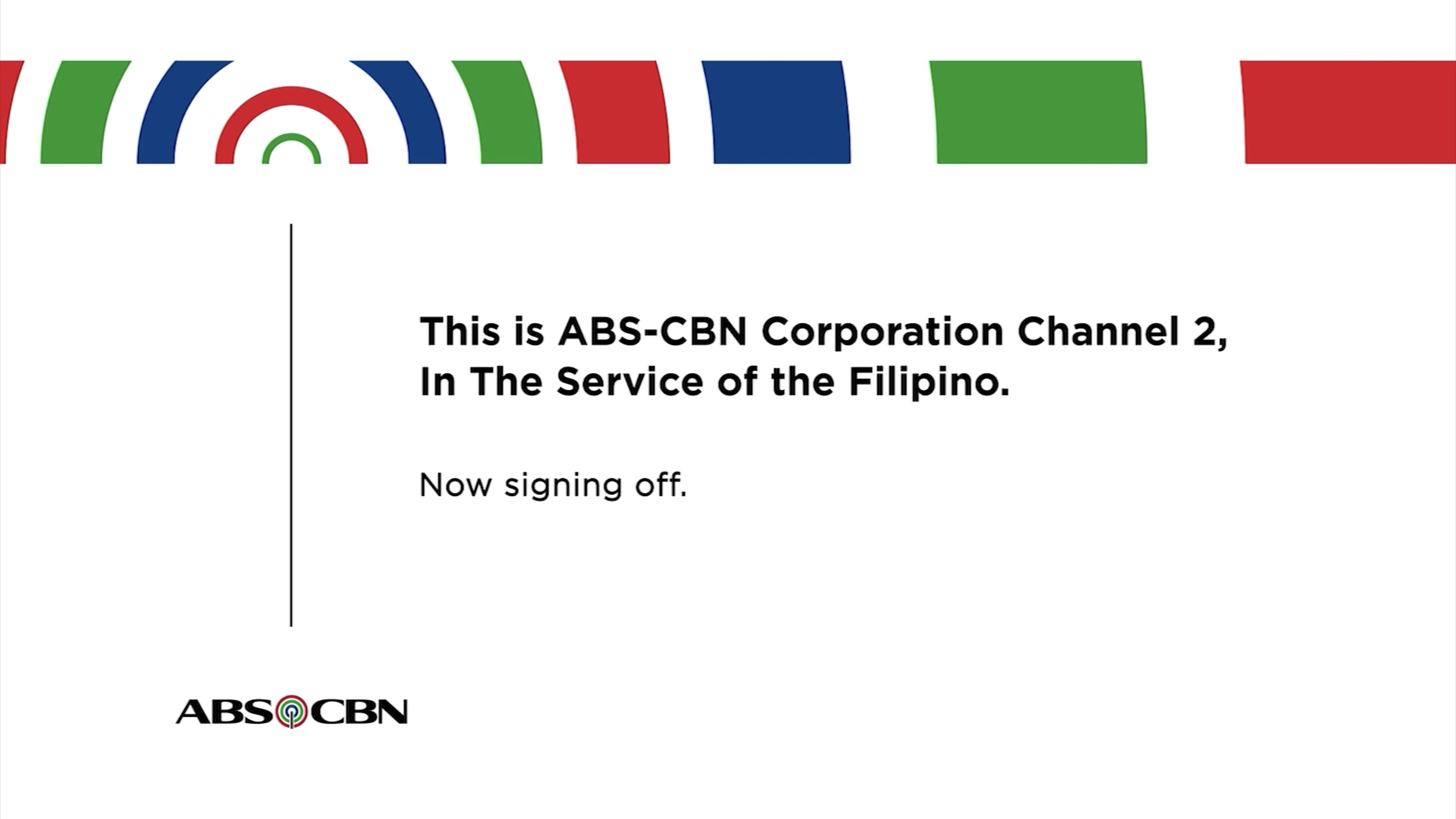
The daily sign-off message broadcast by DWWX-TV. This sign-off was the last image to air before the station ceased all broadcasts at 7:52 pm (PST) on May 5, 2020, following the expiration of ABS-CBN's legislative franchise.

On May 5, 2020, following the expiration of the network's franchise and the issuance of a cease-and-desist order by the National Telecommunications Commission (NTC), DWWX-TV Channel 2 signed off after the airing of the newscast TV Patrol.

The NTC gave ABS-CBN ten days to explain why its frequencies should not be recalled. The decision drew criticism from various sectors as allegedly politically motivated. The station officially ceased broadcasting at 7:52 p.m. local time on the same day.

On May 7, 2020, ABS-CBN, through its legal counsel, filed a petition with the Supreme Court of the Philippines for a temporary restraining order (TRO) to halt the implementation of the NTC's order and to allow DWWX-TV, along with other ABS-CBN television and radio stations nationwide, to resume operations while congressional deliberations on the renewal of its franchise were still ongoing. On May 19, 2020, the Supreme Court asked the NTC and the House of Representatives to submit their comments on ABS-CBN's petition. The issue was scheduled for deliberation on July 13, 2020.

On May 13, 2020, the House of Representatives approved on second reading a bill granting ABS-CBN a provisional franchise until October 31, 2020, which would have allowed its stations to resume operations while hearings on a long-term franchise continued. However, the approval was withdrawn on May 18, after questions were raised regarding the constitutionality of passing the first and second readings on the same day. Some lawmakers also expressed preference for proceeding directly to full franchise hearings. On May 19, House Speaker Alan Peter Cayetano announced that the chamber would instead proceed with hearings on granting ABS-CBN a new 25-year franchise, which could take place even during the congressional recess in preparation for the new session.

On July 10, 2020, after several weeks of hearings, the House of Representatives Committee on Legislative Franchises voted 70–11 to deny ABS-CBN's application for a new 25-year franchise. The decision effectively placed the network at risk of losing an estimated ₱50,000,000 per day due to the shutdown.

On September 10, 2020, the NTC issued an order formally recalling all broadcast frequencies previously assigned to ABS-CBN, stating that the company no longer had a valid congressional franchise to operate. This permanently terminated the broadcasting activities of DWWX-TV Channel 2 and the rest of ABS-CBN's television and radio stations.

The network returned to free-to-air television the following month through a blocktime agreement with ZOE Broadcasting Network, allowing ABS-CBN programs to air on A2Z on ZOE's VHF Channel 11.

==== Frequency takeover by AMBS ====
On January 5, 2022, the Advanced Media Broadcasting System (AMBS), owned by the Villar Group through Planet Cable, was granted a provisional authority by the NTC to use the Channel 2 analog frequency (with the new call sign DZMV-TV) and its corresponding Channel 16 digital frequency for a period of 18 months. The station held its soft launch as All TV on September 13, 2022.

Since April 15, 2024, All TV currently carries the Kapamilya Channel broadcast feed through a content partnership (later brand licensing from December 17, 2025) agreement between AMBS and ABS-CBN, thus marking the return of ABS-CBN on channel 2 after four years.

== Digital television ==
=== Digital channels ===
UHF Channel 43 (647.143 MHz) (Note: ABS-CBN airs the additional channels using this frequency through a blocktime agreement between the network and AMCARA Broadcasting Network.)

Channel	Video	Aspect	Short name	Programming	Note
1.01	480i	16:9	JEEPNEY TV	Jeepney TV	Encrypted (Note: These channels are exclusive to the TV Plus, a digital set-top box marketed by the network. Access to these channels require a free one-time activation through SMS.)
1.02	480i	16:9	ASIANOVELA CHANNEL	Asianovela Channel	Encrypted
1.03	480i	16:9	CINEMO!	Cine Mo!	Encrypted
1.04	480i	16:9	YEY!	Yey!	Encrypted
1.05	480i	16:9	TeleRadyo	TeleRadyo	Commercial broadcast
1.06	480i	16:9	KBO	Kapamilya Box Office	Pay per view (Note: Kapamilya Box Office or KBO Channel is accessible through paid activation through SMS on any mobile network. KBO consists of films and Myx block that is refreshed every week.)
1.31	240p	16:9	TeleRadyo OneSeg	TeleRadyo	1seg

UHF Channel 16 (485.143 MHz)

Channel	Video	Aspect	Short name	Programming	Note
2.01	480i	16:9	Knowledge Channel	Knowledge Channel	Test broadcast
2.02	480i	16:9	O SHOPPING	O Shopping	Test broadcast
2.03	480i	16:9	ASIANOVELA CHANNEL	Asianovela Channel	Test broadcast, encrypted
2.04	480i	16:9	MOVIE CENTRAL	Movie Central	Test broadcast, encrypted
2.05	480i	16:9	JEEPNEY TV	Jeepney TV	Test broadcast, encrypted
2.06	480i	16:9	MYX	Myx	Test broadcast, encrypted
2.07	480i	16:9	RESERVED	Test pattern	Test broadcast, encrypted
2.31	240p	16:9	ASIANOVELA ONESEG	Asianovela Channel	1seg

== See also ==
- List of ABS-CBN Corporation channels and stations
- ABS-CBN
- All TV
- Banahaw Broadcasting Corporation
- DZMV-TV
- DZMM Radyo Patrol 630
- MOR 101.9
- S+A
- History of ABS-CBN

Preceded by DZAQ-TV (1953–1972)	DWWX-TV (1973–2020)	Succeeded by DZMV-TV (2022-present)
