= Banahaw Broadcasting Corporation =

Defunct Philippine television network

Banahaw Broadcasting Corporation (City 2 Television)
- Type: Broadcast radio and television network
- Country: Philippines
- Broadcast area: Defunct

Ownership
- Owner: Roberto Benedicto
- Key people: Roberto Benedicto; Salvador Tan; Peter Musñgi

History
- Launched: November 4, 1973; 52 years ago
- Replaced: ABS-CBN (1st iteration, pre-martial law)
- Closed: July 15, 1986; 40 years ago (radio); September 7, 1986; 40 years ago (television)
- Replaced by: ABS-CBN (2nd iteration, post-martial law)

The Banahaw Broadcasting Corporation (BBC) was a Philippine television network that ran from November 4, 1973 to September 7, 1986, and operated for nearly thirteen years.

The network was well-remembered for its theme song, "Big Beautiful Country", composed by José Mari Chan and sung by Chan with Basil Valdez, Tillie Moreno, Alice Bell and Nonong Pedero.

== History ==
Following the declaration of Martial Law in September 1972, ABS-CBN Corporation's frequencies and facilities were seized by the government.

In June 1973, Roberto Benedicto, a crony of then-President Ferdinand Marcos and owner of the Kanlaon Broadcasting System (KBS), took over the ABS-CBN frequencies and facilities in Quezon City. Banahaw Broadcasting Corporation was established to take over DZAQ-TV 2. Upon commencement of operations, the callsign DZAQ-TV 2 was changed to DWWX-TV 2 (BBC-2), complementing its new sister radio stations DWWK 101.9 FM and DWWA 1160 AM. DZXL-TV 4 was appropriated to the Philippine government to become DWGT-TV 4 (GTV-4) in 1974. Both stations as well as KBS' DZKB-TV 9 (later RPN-9) shared the use of the ABS-CBN Broadcast Center (renamed Broadcast Plaza during the Martial Law era).

By December 1973, the network also operated DYCB-TV 3 in Cebu and DYXL-TV 4 in Bacolod, both originally owned by ABS-CBN. Their call signs were also changed to DYCW-TV and DYBW-TV, respectively. The Cebu and Bacolod stations switched affiliations to GTV (Government Television; later the Maharlika Broadcasting System) in 1978 and reverted to their original call letters respectively.

In 1978, BBC-2 and RPN-9 would relocate from Broadcast Plaza to Benedicto's new Broadcast City complex, along with IBC-13 (Intercontinental Broadcasting Corporation) (originally from San Juan) which was also controlled by Benedicto. GTV-4 would remain in Broadcast Plaza and became MBS-4 (Maharlika Broadcasting System) in 1980.

BBC-2 was rebranded as City 2 Television from 1980 to 1984 when it reverted back to BBC-2. City 2 was the first in the Philippines to incorporate computer-generated graphics using the Scanimate system for its station identity and promo spots, followed only by RPN in 1981. Beginning in 1983, BBC-2 trailblazed another first, as it became the first-ever television network to broadcast 24 hours every Fridays and Saturdays.

At the height of the People Power Revolution in 1986, the operations of the Benedicto networks were halted after reformist soldiers disabled the transmitter that was broadcasting Marcos' inauguration from Malacañang Palace. Upon Corazón C. Aquino's subsequent accession to the presidency, BBC, RPN, IBC and the Broadcast City complex were sequestered by the new government and placed under the management of a Board of Administrators tasked to operate and manage its business and affairs subject to the control and supervision of Presidential Commission on Good Government.

BBC shut down its operations on March 20, 1986, due to the sequestration of the facilities. BBC returned its operation in April 1986. The Presidential Commission on Good Government approved the return of the network's flagship station Channel 2 and a portion of the ABS-CBN Broadcast Center to the Lopezes in June 1986. The Lopez family continued to own ABS-CBN during the Marcos regime and all lease arrangements it entered into with the Philippine government and the Benedicto group for the use of its frequencies and facilities were never entirely recovered. Despite the handover of ownership, DWWX-TV continued to be used as the callsign of the network's flagship station in Metro Manila. BBC shut down its radio operations on July 15, 1986. Later, BBC shut down its television operations on September 7, 1986.

== Television stations ==
- DWWX-TV 2 - Metro Manila. The frequency was awarded to ABS-CBN Corporation from 1986 to 2020. Now known as All TV (DZMV-TV) since 2022.
- D-8-XM-TV 8 - Baguio. Now known as PTV Cordillera (Baguio).
- DYCW-TV 11 - Cebu. Now known as PTV Cebu.
- DXLA-TV 9 - Zamboanga. Now known as GMA Zamboanga.
- DXCC-TV 10 - Cagayan de Oro. Now known as IBC Cagayan de Oro.
- DXMC-TV 12 - Cotabato. Now known as GMA Cotabato.
- DXER-TV 12 - General Santos. Now known as TV5 General Santos.
- DXWW-TV 9- Davao. Now known as RPN Davao.

== Radio stations ==
- DWWA 1160/1206 - Metro Manila. Call letters were changed to DWAN; it was later owned by Intercontinental Broadcasting Corporation and then under the management of Metropolitan Manila Development Authority. The station was re-acquired by IBC in 2024.
- DWWO 1340 - Metro Manila. Closed in 1975.
- DWWK-FM/DWOK-FM 101.9 - Metro Manila. The frequency was awarded to ABS-CBN Corporation from 1986 until its shutdown in 2020 due to its expired broadcast franchise and its denial on July 10, 2020.
- DWLW 675 - Laoag
- DWBW 740 - Baguio
- DWDW 1017 - Dagupan
- DWNW 756 - Naga
- DWGW 684 - Legazpi
- DYBQ 870 - Bacolod
- DYDY 570 - Cebu. Now known as DYMR Radyo Pilipinas 576 Cebu.
- DXCT 690 - Cagayan de Oro
- DXWW 640 - South Cotabato

== See also ==
- DWWX-TV
- DWRR 101.9
- DZMV-TV
