= List of Intercontinental Broadcasting Corporation channels and stations =

These are the TV and radio stations wholly owned and operated by the Intercontinental Broadcasting Corporation in the Philippines.

== TV stations ==
=== Analog ===
Branding	Callsign	Channel	Power	Type	Location
IBC Manila*	DZTV	13	48 kW	Originating	125 St. Peter Street, Nuestra Señora de la Paz Subdivision, Brgy. Sta. Cruz, Antipolo, Rizal
IBC Laoag	DWCS	13	5 kW	Relay	Brgy. 48-A, Cabungaan North, Laoag, Ilocos Norte
IBC Cebu	DYTV	13	0.1 kW	Relay	Brgy. Kalunasan, Cebu City
IBC Cagayan de Oro	DXCC	10	0.2 kW	Relay	Bontula, Brgy. Macasandig, Cagayan de Oro
IBC Davao	DXTV	13	7 kW	Relay	Shrine Hills, Matina, Davao City

- Switch-off by November 22, 2026

=== Digital ===
Branding	Callsign	Channel	Frequency	Power	Type	Location
IBC Manila	DZTV	17	491.143 MHz	5 kW	Originating	125 St. Peter Street, Nuestra Señora de la Paz Subdivision, Brgy. Sta. Cruz, Antipolo, Rizal
IBC Benguet	DZHB	17	491.143 MHz	5 kW	Relay	Mt. Sto. Tomas, Tuba, Benguet
IBC Laoag	DWCS	17	491.143 MHz	5 kW	Relay	Brgy. 48-A, Cabungaan North, Laoag, Ilocos Norte
IBC Tuguegarao	—N/a	17	491.143 MHz	5 kW	Relay	Brgy. Buntun, Tuguegarao, Cagayan
IBC Batangas	—N/a	17	491.143 MHz	5 kW	Relay	Mt. Banoy, Batangas
IBC Legazpi	—N/a	17	491.143 MHz	5 kW	Relay	Brgy. Taysan, Legazpi, Albay
IBC Naga	—N/a	17	491.143 MHz	5 kW	Relay	Brgy. Panicuason, Naga, Camarines Sur
IBC Masbate	DYME	17	491.143 MHz	1 kW	Relay	Zurbito Street, Masbate City, Masbate
IBC Iloilo	DYJB	17	491.143 MHz	7.5 kW	Relay	Brgy. Alaguisoc, Jordan, Guimaras
IBC Cebu	DYTV	17	491.143 MHz	5 kW	Relay	Brgy. Kalunasan, Cebu City
IBC Palo	DYDS	17	491.143 MHz	5 kW	Relay	Brgy. Candahug, Palo, Leyte
IBC Calbayog	—N/a	17	491.143 MHz	3 kW	Relay	Brgy. Cagsalaosao, Calbayog, Samar
IBC Cagayan de Oro	DXCC	17	491.143 MHz	5 kW	Relay	Bontula, Brgy. Macasandig, Cagayan de Oro
IBC Davao	DXTV	17	491.143 MHz	5 kW	Relay	Shrine Hills, Matina, Davao City

=== Digital Main and Sub Channels ===
==== IBC Manila ====
LCN	Video	Aspect	Name	Programming	Notes
13.01	1080i	16:9	IBC HD	IBC	Commercial Broadcast
13.02	1080i	16:9	CongressTV HD	Congress TV	Commercial Broadcast
13.03	1080i	16:9	SenateTV HD	Senate TV	Test Broadcast

==== Relay Stations ====
LCN	Video	Aspect	Name	Programming	Notes
17.01	1080i	16:9	IBC13	IBC	Commercial Broadcast
17.02	1080i	16:9	Congress TV	Congress TV	Commercial Broadcast

== Radio stations ==
=== AM Stations ===
Branding	Callsign	Frequency	Power	Location
DWAN 1206	DWAN	1206 kHz	10 kW	Metro Manila
Radyo Budyong Panay	DYJJ	1296 kHz	1 kW	Roxas, Capiz

=== Affiliate Stations ===
Branding	Callsign	Frequency	Power	Location	Owner
Radyo Masbate	DYME	783 kHz	5 kW	Masbate City	Masbate Community Broadcasting Company
K5 News FM Masbate	DYME	95.9 MHz	1 kW	Masbate City	Masbate Community Broadcasting Company
Idol Radio	DYMP	88.1 MHz	1 kW	Palo, Leyte	Presidential Broadcast Service

== See also ==
- Intercontinental Broadcasting Corporation
- Media of the Philippines
