= DXCC-TV =

Television station in Cagayan de Oro, the Philippines

IBC TV-10 Cagayan de Oro (DXCC-TV)
Relay of DZTV-TV
- Cagayan de Oro; Philippines
- Channels: Analog: 10 (VHF); Digital: 17 (UHF) (ISDB-T); Virtual: 17.01
- Branding: IBC TV-10 Cagayan de Oro

Programming
- Subchannels: 17.01: IBC; 17.02: Congress TV

Ownership
- Owner: Intercontinental Broadcasting Corporation

History
- First air date: March 26, 1969
- Former call signs: As IBC: DXEC-TV (1973–1986)
- Former channel numbers: 2 (1973-1986); As IBC: 4 (1973–1986)
- Former affiliations: ABC (1968-1972); BBC (1973-1986)

Technical information
- Licensing authority: NTC
- Power: Analog: 0.2 kW; Digital: 5 kW

Links
- Website: https://ibctv13.com/

DXCC-TV (TV-10 analog; DTV-17 digital) is a television station of the Philippine television network Intercontinental Broadcasting Corporation. Its transmitter are currently located at Sitio Bontula, Barangay Macasandig, Cagayan de Oro.

The station started broadcasting on March 26, 1969, broadcasting for five hours a day. The station was part of the RMN-IBC complex before 1975.

== Digital Channels ==
DXCC-TV's digital signal operates on UHF Channel 17 (491.143 MHz) and broadcasts on the following subchannels:

| LCN | Video | Aspect | Name | Programming | Notes |
|---|---|---|---|---|---|
| 17.01 | 1080i | 16:9 | IBC13 | IBC | Commercial Broadcast |
| 17.02 | 1080i | 16:9 | Congress TV | Congress TV | Commercial Broadcast |

== Coverage Areas ==
=== Primary Areas ===
- Cagayan de Oro
- Portion of Misamis Oriental

==== Secondary Areas ====
- Northern portion of Bukidnon
- Camiguin
- Portion of Misamis Occidental

== See also ==
- List of Intercontinental Broadcasting Corporation channels and stations
