= DYTM-TV =

IBC TV-2 Dumaguete (DYTM-TV)
- Dumaguete, Negros Oriental; Philippines
- Channels: Analog: 2 (VHF)

Programming
- Affiliations: Intercontinental Broadcasting Corporation

Ownership
- Owner: Intercontinental Broadcasting Corporation
- Sister stations: DYRM-TV (RPN)

History
- First air date: 1998
- Call sign meaning: DYTM

Technical information
- Power: 5 kW
- Repeaters: DYBD-TV 12 (Bacolod, Negros Occidental)

DYTM-TV, channel 2, was a television station of Philippine television network Intercontinental Broadcasting Corporation. Its studios and transmitter are located in Brgy. Calindagan, Dumaguete, Negros Oriental. This station is currently inactive.

== See also ==
- List of Intercontinental Broadcasting Corporation channels and stations
