= DYJB-DTV =

IBC DTV-17 Iloilo (DYJB-DTV)
Relay of DZTV-TV
- Iloilo; Philippines
- Channels: Digital: 17 (UHF, test) (ISDB-T); Virtual: 17.01
- Branding: IBC DTV-17 Iloilo

Programming
- Affiliations: 17.01 IBC 17.02 Congress TV 17.03 Senate TV

Ownership
- Owner: Intercontinental Broadcasting Corporation

History
- First air date: September 4, 1966
- Last air date: 2020 (Analog TV broadcast)
- Former call signs: DYJB-TV (1966-2020)
- Former channel number: Analog: 12 (VHF) (1966-2020)
- Former affiliations: MBC (1966-1972)

Technical information
- Licensing authority: NTC
- Power: 5 kW
- ERP: 7 kW
- Repeaters: DYXX-TV 2 (Roxas City, Capiz)

DYJB-DTV, channel 17, is a digital-only television station of Philippine television network Intercontinental Broadcasting Corporation in Iloilo City. Its offices are located at Datu Puti Subdivision, Brgy. Cubay, Jaro, Iloilo City and its transmitter is located at Purok 7, Brgy. Alaguisoc, Jordan, Guimaras.

== DYJB-DTV 17 history ==
- 1966 - Started at Bacolod as IBC 12 with only 200 watts as a relay station.
- 1975 - First broadcast and became the first TV station in Panay Island with a power of 5,000 watts and increased its power to 7,500 watts that covered the whole Western Visayas reaching Roxas City, Capiz in the north, San Jose, Antique in the west, the whole western part of Negros Island down to Kabankalan. And the first TV station to cover live the Iloilo's Annual Festival the Dinagyang Ati-Ati Tribe.
- 2016 - it decrease its power to 500 watts due to technical issues with their transmitter until it ceased its analog VHF 12 TV operations.
- IBC Iloilo ceased analog broadcasting on VHF channel 12 in 2020.
- April 27, 2022 - IBC DTV-17 Iloilo commenced digital test broadcasts on UHF Channel 17 covering Metro Iloilo and the provinces of Iloilo and Guimaras.

== IBC 12 Iloilo previously aired programs ==
- 12 Under Club (1975-1998) - first TV kid show in the whole Region VI.
- Ikaw Kabuhi Ko (1975-1997; 1999-2003) - first and longest humanitarian public service show in the Western Visayas region.
- Kampeon sa Rehiyon (1975-2001) - first talent show in Region VI.
- Tele-Radyo (1975-2016) - first local noon time talk show now dubbed as "PaniudTALK".

== Subchannels ==
Subchannels of DYJB-DTV
| Channel | Video | Aspect | Short name | Programming | Note |
|---|---|---|---|---|---|
| 17.01 | 1080i | 16:9 | IBC | IBC Iloilo (Main DYJB-DTV programming) | Test Broadcast / Configuration Testing |
| 17.02 | 1080i | 16:9 | Congress TV | Congress TV | Test Broadcast / Configuration Testing |
| 17.03 | 1080i | 16:9 | Senate TV | Senate TV | Test Broadcast / Configuration Testing |

== Areas of coverage ==
=== Primary areas ===
- Iloilo City
- Iloilo Province
- Guimaras

==== Secondary areas ====
- Bacolod
- Portion of Negros Occidental
- Portion of Capiz (Digital Signal only)

== See also ==
- List of television and radio stations in Iloilo City
- List of Intercontinental Broadcasting Corporation channels and stations
