= DXTV-TV =

Television station in Davao, the Philippines

IBC TV-13 Davao (DXTV-TV)
Relay of DZTV-TV
- Metro Davao; Philippines
- City: Davao City
- Channels: Analog: 13 (VHF); Digital: 17 (UHF, test) (ISDB-T); Virtual: 17.01

Programming
- Subchannels: 17.01: IBC; 17.02: Congress TV

Ownership
- Owner: Intercontinental Broadcasting Corporation

History
- First air date: January 19, 1960

Technical information
- Licensing authority: NTC
- Power: Analog: 7 kW; Digital: 5 kW
- ERP: Analog: 21 kW; Digital: 15 kW

DXTV-TV, channel 13, is a commercial television station owned by Intercontinental Broadcasting Corporation. The station's transmitter is located at Broadcast Ave., Shrine Hills, Matina, Davao City. The station started broadcasting on January 19, 1960.

Recently, it just went back on the air after a few months of inactivity through Cignal's feed (basically relay from Manila's flagship station).

== IBC 13 Davao previously aired programs ==
- Davao Express Balita (2002–2003)

== Digital television ==
=== Digital channels ===
DXTV-TV's digital signal operates on UHF channel 17 (491.143 MHz) and broadcasts on the following subchannels:

Channel	Video	Aspect	Short name	Programming	Note
17.01	1080i	16:9	IBC13	IBC Davao (Main DXTV-TV programming)	Test Broadcast / Configuration Testing
17.02	1080i	16:9	Congress TV	Congress TV	Test Broadcast / Configuration Testing
17.03	1080i	16:9	Senate TV	Senate TV	Test Broadcast / Configuration Testing

== Area of coverage ==
- Davao del Norte (including Samal)
- Davao City
- Davao del Sur

== See also ==
- List of Intercontinental Broadcasting Corporation channels and stations
