= DZHB-DTV =

IBC DTV-17 cordillera (DZHB-DTV)
- Baguio; Philippines
- Channels: Digital: 17 (UHF, test) (ISDB-T)
- Branding: IBC DTV-17 Cordillera

Programming
- Affiliations: 17.01 IBC; 17.02 Congress TV; 17.03 Senate TV

Ownership
- Owner: Intercontinental Broadcasting Corporation

History
- Founded: 1980; 46 years ago
- Last air date: 2020; 6 years ago (Analog TV broadcast)
- Former call signs: DZHB-TV (1980-2020)
- Former channel number: Analog: 6 (VHF) (1980-2020)
- Call sign meaning: DZ; Herald of Benguet

Technical information
- Licensing authority: NTC
- Power: 5 kW
- ERP: 40 kW

DZHB-DTV, channel 17, is a commercial Originating digital television station owned by Intercontinental Broadcasting Corporation. The Flagship station's transmitter is located at Mt. Sto. Tomas, Tuba, Benguet Province.

IBC Baguio ceased analog broadcasting on VHF channel 6 in 2020.

On December 12, 2024, the network resumed broadcasting through digital terrestrial television (DTT) on UHF Channel 17.

== Areas of coverage ==
=== Primary areas ===
- Baguio
- Benguet
- La Union
- Pangasinan

==== Secondary areas ====
- Portion of Ilocos Sur
- Portion of Nueva Ecija
- Portion of Tarlac

== Digital television ==
=== Digital channels ===
DZHB-DTV's digital signal operates on UHF channel 17 (491.143 MHz) and broadcasts on the following subchannels:

Channel	Video	Aspect	Short name	Programming	Note
17.01	1080i	16:9	IBC	IBC Baguio (Main DZHB-DTV programming)	Fully migrated from analog to digital (Test Broadcast / Configuration Testing)
17.02	1080i	16:9	Congress TV	Congress TV	Fully migrated from analog to digital (Test Broadcast / Configuration Testing)
17.03	1080i	16:9	Senate TV	Senate TV	Fully migrated from analog to digital (Test Broadcast / Configuration Testing)

NTC released implementing rules and regulations on the re-allocation of the UHF Channels 14-20 (470–512 Megahertz (MHz) band) for digital terrestrial television broadcasting (DTTB) service. All operating and duly authorized Mega Manila VHF (very high frequency) television networks are entitled to a channel assignment from Channels 14 to 20.

== See also ==
- List of Intercontinental Broadcasting Corporation channels and stations
