= DYJJ =

Radyo Budyong Roxas (DYJJ)
- Roxas City; Philippines
- Broadcast area: Northern Panay
- Frequency: 1296 kHz
- Branding: DYJJ Radyo Budyong

Programming
- Languages: Capiznon, Filipino
- Format: News, Public Affairs, Talk
- Network: Radyo Budyong

Ownership
- Owner: Intercontinental Broadcasting Corporation

History
- First air date: April 1, 1981

Technical information
- Licensing authority: NTC
- Power: 1 kW

DYJJ (1296 AM) Radyo Budyong is a radio station owned and operated by Intercontinental Broadcasting Corporation. Its studio is located along Arnaldo Blvd., Brgy. Baybay, Roxas City.

== History ==
DYJJ was established in Roxas City on April 1, 1981. It is one of the three provincial stations in the Visayas owned by Intercontinental Broadcasting Corporation (IBC), a broadcast corporation then owned by the late Philippine Ambassador to Japan Roberto Benedicto. DYJJ was among the most listened to radio stations in the city, especially in the absence of FM stations and cable TV.

Shortly after the People Power Revolution in 1986, the instability of its leadership due to massive organizational changes and visions has brought havoc on its operations. Shaky leadership and sudden changes of decision-makers at the central office contributed a lot on the deterioration of DYJJ for nearly two decades.

In 2004, DYJJ regained its strength when its tower was erected, its programming was computerized, and several positive structural changes and corporate policies were introduced. However, due to its vintage radio transmitter, its audio output has been a very big problem not only on its programming, but also its financial viability.
