= Dwan =

Dwan is both a surname and a given name. Notable people with the name include:

Surname

- Allan Dwan (1885–1981), pioneering Canadian-born American film director, producer and screenwriter
- Dorothy Dwan (1906–1981), American actress of the 1920s
- Jack Dwan (1921–1993), American professional basketball player
- John Dwan, one of the founders of the 3M corporation
- Kenny Dwan (born 1948), former British rower and Queen's Bargemaster
- Lisa Dwan (born 1977), Irish actress
- Robert Dwan (1915–2005), director of Groucho Marx's radio and TV show, You Bet Your Life
- Tom Dwan (born 1986), American professional poker player
- Virginia Dwan (born October 18, 1931), founder of avant-garde art galleries in Los Angeles and New York

Given name

- Dwan Edwards (born 1981), former American NFL football player
- Dwan McMillan (born 1989), American basketball coach

Fictional characters:

- Jessica Lange's character in King Kong (1976 film)

== See also ==
- John Dwan Office Building, Minnesota, United States
- DWAN (disambiguation), callsign used by 2 radio stations in the Philippines
