= DWAN =

DWAN may refer to:

- DWAN-AM, an AM radio station broadcasting in Metro Manila
- DWAN-FM, an FM radio station broadcasting in Puerto Princesa, branded as Home Radio

== See also ==
- Dwan
