= Congress TV =

Philippine digital television channel

CongressTV
- Type: Legislature broadcaster
- Country: Philippines
- Broadcast area: Nationwide
- Headquarters: Quezon City, Metro Manila

Programming
- Languages: Filipino, English
- Picture format: 1080i HDTV

Ownership
- Owner: People's Television Network (until November 17, 2024); Intercontinental Broadcasting Corporation; House of Representatives of the Philippines
- Sister channels: PTV; Radyo Pilipinas - Radyo Publiko; PTV Sports Network; Senate TV; DWAN TV; IBC

History
- Launched: January 22, 2024; 2 years ago
- Replaced: PCO TV/RTVMalacanañg; One Sports HD (Cignal TV channel renumbering space)
- Replaced by: PTV (mirror feed; channel 14 channel space)

Availability At time of closure

Terrestrial
- Digital Terrestrial Television: Channel 17 (Manila) LCN: 13.02 (Manila) Channel 17 (Laoag) LCN: 17.02 (Laoag) Channel 17 (Baguio) LCN: 17.02 (Baguio) Channel 17 (Naga) LCN: 17.02 (Naga) Channel 17 (Iloilo) LCN: 17.02 (Iloilo) Channel 17 (Cebu) LCN: 17.02 (Cebu) Channel 17 (Cagayan De Oro) LCN: 17.02 (Cagayan De Oro) Channel 17 (Davao) LCN: 17.02 (Davao)
- Converge Vision (Metro Manila): Channel 42
- Cignal TV (Nationwide): Channel 17
- Sky TV (Metro Manila): Channel 60
- Cablelink (Metro Manila): Channel 108
- Other Cable/Satellite Provider: Check Local Listings

CongressTV is a Philippine digital television channel owned and managed by state-run networks People's Television Network (until November 17, 2024) and Intercontinental Broadcasting Corporation in collaboration with the House of Representatives of the Philippines. It follows a format similar to public affairs legislative channels, primarily broadcasting live plenary sessions, committee hearings, and other content produced by the House of Representatives.

The channel launched on January 22, 2024, initially broadcasting on digital terrestrial television via PTV's second subchannel and through the social media accounts of PTV, IBC, and the House of Representatives. It later expanded its terrestrial reach through IBC's DTT network and became available on cable and satellite providers nationwide, including Cignal TV.

== Details ==
Congress TV follows a format similar to public affairs channels such as C-SPAN, CPAC, BBC Parliament, Phoenix, News24 World, Vouli Tileorasi, and TVP Parlament. It mainly airs live plenary sessions, committee hearings and other content produced by the House of Representatives on digital television.

The channel was launched on January 22, 2024. Initially, it was broadcast on digital terrestrial television (DTT) via PTV's second subchannel. Additionally, it is available through PTV, IBC, and HoR's social media accounts from 9:00 AM to 9:00 PM (PST) daily, with extended hours if needed.

On October 1, 2024, Congress TV expanded its reach by broadcasting on channel 17 in Metro Manila via IBC's DTT network, becoming the network's second subchannel. At the same time, select programs were also simulcast on IBC's main analog signal. IBC also co-produces Congress News and Treze Sa Tanghali (formerly Ala Una Sa Balita), the flagship newscasts of Congress TV.

On November 1, 2024, the channel commenced broadcast on Sky Cable Channel 29 in Metro Manila replacing BBC News.

On November 17, 2024, Congress TV ended its broadcast on PTV's DTT transmitters, and was replaced with a mirror feed of the main PTV channel; leaving terrestrial broadcast of the channel to IBC-owned transmitters.

Since March 26, 2026, CongressTV has been available on Cignal TV as Channel 17, expanding its reach nationwide.

On October 27, 2026, Senate TV was launched, which focuses exclusively on the Philippine Senate.
