= Antonio Quirino =

Filipino judge, entrepreneur, and politician

Chairman of Alto Broadcasting System/ABS-CBN (Broadcasting) Corporation
- In office 1952 – September 24, 1956
- Preceded by: James Lindenberg (Bolinao Electronics Corporation)
- Succeeded by: Eugenio Lopez Sr. (Chronicle Broadcasting Network)

Personal details
- Born: Antonio Rivera Quirino; January 20, 1906 Vigan, Ilocos Sur, Philippine Islands, U.S.
- Died: January 3, 1992 (aged 85) Manila, Philippines
- Party: Liberal (1951-1992)
- Spouse: Aleli Aguilar de Guzman
- Relations: Monique Lagdameo (granddaughter)
- Children: 7
- Profession: Judge

Antonio Rivera Quirino Sr. (January 20, 1906 – January 3, 1992) was a Filipino judge, entrepreneur, and politician. He was the youngest brother of President Elpidio Quirino. He helped develop Alto Broadcasting System (ABS) before it was absorbed by Chronicle Broadcasting Network (CBN) to form ABS-CBN Corporation from the merged two media companies.

== Early life and education ==
Quirino was born on January 20, 1906. He graduated from the University of the Philippines College of Law and was a member of the Upsilon Sigma Phi fraternity.

== Political career ==
Quirino ran for Senate spot in 1951 under the Liberal banner, but lost and placed 13th (as then Senate needs only top 8). He ran for President in 1957 under his own wing of the party, but also lost to Carlos P. Garcia and placed 5th.

He ran for representative of the 1st district of Rizal in 1969 as an independent Liberal, but lost to Rizal Vice Governor Neptali Gonzales and placed 5th.

== 1948 Hukbalahap amnesty ==
In 1948, Quirino convinced Hukbalahap leader Luis Taruc to present himself to President Elpidio Quirino. Taruc agreed and the Philippine government granted an amnesty to the Hukbalahap and the Pambansang Kaisahan ng mga Magbubukid (PKM). The government agreed go the Hukbalahap's terms, giving the group a fifty-day amnesty to let them give up their weapons in exchange for certain provisions. Three hours after the amnesty period ended, government troops attacked Taruc's group, who accused the government of bad faith. One of the provisions was to forbid the United States to maintain military bases on Philippine soil, which the government did not accept.

== Philippine television ==
Quirino established the first television station in the Philippines primarily to support the reelection campaign of his brother, President Elpidio Quirino, for the 1953 election. The station was DZAQ-TV of Alto Broadcasting System, a predecessor network company of ABS-CBN. The first telecast of DZAQ-TV was aired on October 23, 1953 and was that of a party of Antonio in which his brother, Elpídio, became the first Filipino president to appear on television, though the broadcast did not end in an appeal by Antonio for the audience to vote to reelect his brother.

== Personal life ==
Quiríno was the youngest male in a brood of six children. In 1938, he married Aleli Aguilar de Guzman. The couple had seven children. He is the grandfather of former vice mayor of Makati and current representative Monique Lagdameo.
