= Philippines Daily Express =

Defunct Philippine daily newspaper

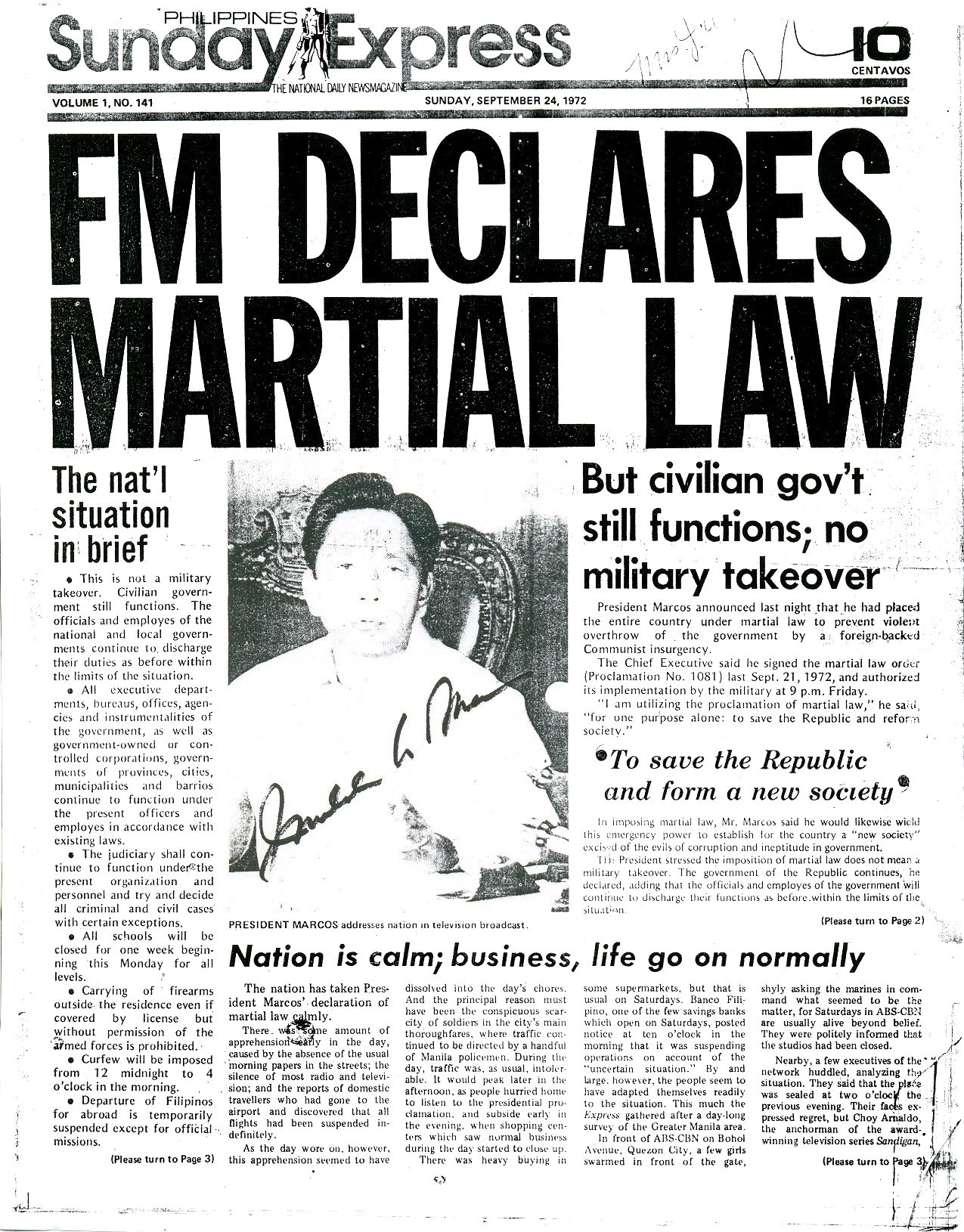
- The September 24, 1972, front page depicting Ferdinand Marcos' declaration of martial law the previous day
- Type: Daily newspaper
- Format: Broadsheet
- Owner: Roberto Benedicto
- Founded: May 9, 1972; 54 years ago
- Ceased publication: March 13, 1987; 39 years ago
- Political alignment: Pro-Marcos
- Language: English
- Headquarters: Metro Manila, Philippines
- City: Manila
- Country: Philippines

The Philippines Daily Express, commonly known as the Daily Express, was a daily newspaper in the Philippines. It was better known for circulating propagandist news articles related to then-President Ferdinand Marcos during the time of his regime. Its Sunday edition was known as the Philippines Sunday Express.

== History ==
It was founded on May 9, 1972, by entrepreneur and Marcos crony Roberto Benedicto. The newspaper was reopened a few days after Marcos declared martial law, wherein most media and newspaper outlets who were critical against the latter were closed and taken over by the military. Benedicto assigned Enrique Romualdez, a relative of first lady Imelda Marcos, as chief editor of the paper to ensure that it held the views of the regime. According to Romualdez, he made sure that the Philippine Daily Express published stories favorable to Ferdinand Marcos.

Other newspapers were eventually allowed to operate, though these were closely watched by government censors. Philippine Daily Express, on the other hand, was not inspected by censors since it was already controlled by the Marcos administration. Romualdez also said that they were able to practice self-censorship at the Philippine Daily Express.

After the EDSA People Power Revolution in 1986, which signaled the end of Marcos regime, most of the assets owned by Marcos's cronies were sequestered by the government under Aquino administration, including Daily Express. The newspaper ceased publication in 1987.

== See also ==
- Journalism during the Marcos dictatorship
- Censorship in the Philippines § Martial law period
- Ferdinand Marcos's cult of personality § Control of mass media
- Cronies of Ferdinand Marcos § Roberto Benedicto
- Monopolies in the Philippines (1965–1986) § Publishing
