= James Lindenberg =

American-born Filipino engineer and businessman

Chairman, Bolinao Electronics Corporation/ABS-CBN (Broadcasting) Corporation
- In office June 13, 1946 – 1952
- Succeeded by: Antonio Quirino (1952–1957 as Chairman of Alto Broadcasting System); Eugenio Lopez, Sr. (Chronicle Broadcasting Network)

Personal details
- Born: December 20, 1921 Pittsburgh, Pennsylvania, U.S.
- Died: April 28, 2009 (aged 87) Makati, Philippines
- Spouse: Soledad S. Lindenberg
- Profession: Engineer
- Known for: One of the four founders of ABS-CBN and Founder of Radio Philippines Network

James Lindenberg (December 20, 1921 – April 28, 2009) was an American-born Filipino engineer and businessman. He moved to the Philippines in the 1940s. He is credited for his founding of Bolinao Electronics Corporation (BEC), the precursor of ABS-CBN Corporation dubbing as the Father of Philippine Television, and Radio Philippines Network.

== Personal ==
James Lindenberg was born December 20, 1921, in Pittsburgh, Pennsylvania, USA. He was married to Soledad S. Lindenberg. He died April 28, 2009, in Makati, Philippines.

== Career in the Philippines ==
=== ABS-CBN ===
On June 13, 1946, he began assembling transmitters and established Bolinao Electronics Corporation (BEC). The company was named after his wife's hometown of Bolinao, Pangasinan. He was the first to apply to the Philippine Congress for a license to open a television station three years later. His wish was fulfilled on June 14, 1950, one year later. Instead, he had to get into radio broadcasting because of the tight import controls (since 1948) and lack of raw materials.

His attempt to put up a television station did not go to waste. Antonio Quirino, a judge and brother of then-Philippine President Elpidio Quirino, had been trying to get a license from Congress that would allow him to put up a television station. The Congress, however, denied him from getting such a license for the fear that he might use it as a vehicle for propaganda for his brother who was then running for a second term in the presidential elections of 1953. Because of this, Antonio Quirino bought a 70% share in BEC, which earned him indirect control of a television franchise. He changed the name of BEC to Alto Broadcasting System (ABS). Lindenberg continued to be a co-owner and served as the general manager, and in November 1955 directed hands-on the first televised coverage of an election in the Philippines with the cooperation of the Commission on Elections (Comelec) and the National Citizens' Movement for Free Elections (NAMFREL). On February 24, 1957, Don Eugenio Lopez, Sr. acquired ABS from Quirino and Lindenberg.

=== RPN ===
After co-founding ABS-CBN, Lindenberg founded the Radio Philippines Network on February 25, 1960. RPN was formed as the Congress of the Philippines approved its franchise on June 19, 1960, and in 1969, RPN has acquiring several broadcasting equipment facilities and channel frequencies from Lindenberg's previous firm ABS-CBN, such as Channel 9. In late 1960's, Lindenberg sold the entire network to Ambassador Roberto Benedicto, one of the cronies of former President Ferdinand Marcos.

== See also ==
- ABS-CBN Corporation
- Radio Philippines Network

| Preceded by First | Bolinao Electronics Corporation (now ABS-CBN Corporation) Chairman; June 13, 1946 – 1952 | Succeeded by Antonio Quirino (as Alto Broadcasting System) |
