= DWAN-AM =

Radio station in Metro Manila, Philippines

DWAN
- Quezon City; Philippines
- Broadcast area: Mega Manila and surrounding areas
- Frequency: 1206 kHz
- Branding: DWAN 1206

Programming
- Languages: Filipino, English
- Format: Full-service (News, Talk, Music)

Ownership
- Owner: Intercontinental Broadcasting Corporation
- Sister stations: DZTV-TV (IBC)

History
- First air date: 1973
- Former call signs: DWWA (1973–1984)
- Former names: DWWA (1973–1984); D' Wan (1984–1986, 1996–2004); IBC Broadkast Patrol (1986–1990); Islands Galing Broadkaster (1990–1992); MMDA Traffic Radio (2007–2010)
- Former frequencies: 1160 kHz (1973–1978)
- Call sign meaning: Pronounced as "the one"

Technical information
- Licensing authority: NTC
- Power: 10,000 watts

Links
- Webcast: Listen and Watch Live (via Facebook Live, Selected programs only); Listen and Watch Live

DWAN (1206 AM) is a radio station owned and operated by the Intercontinental Broadcasting Corporation. The station's studio is located at the IBC Compound, Lot 3-B, Capitol Hills Drive cor. Zuzuarregui Street, Brgy. Matandang Balara, Diliman, Quezon City, and its transmitter is located in Brgy. Marulas, Valenzuela, Metro Manila.

== History ==
The station was established in 1973 by the Banahaw Broadcasting Corporation, a company owned by the late Marcos crony Roberto Benedicto, on 1160 AM under the call letters DWWA. In November 1978, it transferred its frequency to 1206 AM, in response to the adoption of the 9 kHz spacing on AM radio stations in the Philippines under the Geneva Frequency Plan of 1975. In 1984, it changed its call letters to DWAN.

When BBC was dissolved as a television network after the 1986 EDSA Revolution, ownership of the station was transferred to the Intercontinental Broadcasting Corporation under the name IBC Broadkast Patrol. Prior to this, IBC owned DWKW 1280/1386 AM. By this time, it was located at the now-demolished Broadcast City complex. Among its roster of presenters under the Broadkast Patrol brand after the People Power Revolution were the late Tita Betty Mendez, Henry Jones Ragas, Susan Enriquez and Friendly Nicky.

On November 25, 1996, DWAN went back on air, this time under the management of the Asia–Pacific News & Features (ASPAC News), which was headed by Bubby Dacer back then. Ducky Paredes took over the operations upon its relaunch in late June 1997. Notable announcers included Rod Navarro, Giovanni Calvo, Pol Velasco, Barr Samson, Lilia Andolong, Cesar Chavez, and (the late) John Susi. It went off the air in 2004.

On September 24, 2007, the station went back on air, this time as MMDA Traffic Radio under the management of the Metropolitan Manila Development Authority under the chairmanship of Bayani Fernando. Similar to American traveler's information stations and Japanese highway advisory radio, the station provided real-time traffic updates, public service reminders and tourism shows promoting the 17 cities and towns within Metro Manila. Some of its programs were later simulcast on cable television through MMDA TV.

Despite being managed by MMDA, it also tapped program writers and veteran radio announcers Barr Samson, Ben Paypon, Hero Robregado and Gani Oro in its first few months before being controversially dismissed due to policy differences.

In 2008, the Metro Manila Council endorsed a resolution for the agency to be granted its own legislative broadcasting franchise but never came into fruition in the Congress.

On July 13, 2010, MMDA Traffic Radio went off the air as an effect of Typhoon Basyang (Conson)'s onslaught, but returned on-air after a week. On August 17, 2010, MMDA chairperson Francis Tolentino ordered the termination of its broadcasts to comply with the government's austerity measures. The broadcasts, costing the MMDA P1 million monthly, had reportedly not been effective in its information dissemination efforts. MMDA later focused its information dissemination through government-owned NBN-4 and the Internet.

On January 18, 2024, IBC announced its plans to revive the frequency with a full-service format. It was launched on June 20, with programs launched on July 1. IBC's digital subchannel was utilized by DWAN's TeleRadyo feed from July 3, 2024 to October 1, 2026, when it was replaced by Senate TV.

== Notable presenters ==
=== Current ===
- Antonio Cerilles

=== Past ===
- Rod Navarro
- Cesar Chavez
- Francis Tolentino
- Marc Logan
