= DZMV-TV =

Television station in Metro Manila, Philippines

ALLTV2 Manila (DZMV-TV)
- Metro Manila; Philippines
- City: Quezon City; Mandaluyong
- Channels: Analog: 2 (VHF) (until January 15, 2027; 58 days' time); Digital: 16 (UHF) (ISDB-T); Virtual: 2
- Branding: ALLTV2 Manila

Programming
- Language: Filipino (mainly)
- Subchannels: See list
- Affiliations: 02.01: All TV HD

Ownership
- Owner: Advanced Media Broadcasting System (Broadcast Spectrum, and License)
- Operator: ABS-CBN Corporation (Programming Facilities and Master Control or Broadcast Feed)
- Sister stations: Through AMBS: All Radio 103.5; Through ABS-CBN: DZOE-TV (A2Z / ZOE TV); DZMM Radyo Patrol 630; Kapamilya Channel; Jeepney TV; Cine Mo!; Cinema One

History
- First air date: September 13, 2022; 4 years ago
- Former call signs: ABS-CBN era: DWWX-TV (1986–2020)
- Call sign meaning: Manny Villar, chairman, AMBS

Technical information
- Licensing authority: NTC
- Power: Analog: 50 kW; Digital: 10 kW
- ERP: Analog: 100 kW; Digital: 25 kW

Links
- Website: alltv.ph

DZMV-TV (VHF channel 2 Analog, UHF channel 16 Digital) is a television station in Metro Manila, Philippines, serving as the flagship of the All TV network. It is owned by Advanced Media Broadcasting System (AMBS), which is controlled by All Value Holdings Inc. through parent company Planet Cable. ABS-CBN Corporation, which operates A2Z flagship DZOE-TV channel 11 (owned by ZOE TV), operates the station under a brand licensing agreement. The two stations, together with DZMM Radyo Patrol 630 (Owned by Philippine Collective Media Corporation and conjointly operated with ABS-CBN under Media Serbisyo Production Corporation), share studios at the ABS-CBN Broadcasting Center, Sgt. Esguerra Ave. corner Mo. Ignacia St., Diliman, Quezon City.

DZMV-TV maintains its secondary studios and broadcast facilities at 2nd Floor (formerly CNN Philippines Studio), Worldwide Corporate Center, Shaw Boulevard, Mandaluyong. The station's temporary analog and digital transmitting facility is located at Diliman, Quezon City (tentative relocation to the Eugenio Lopez Center, Santa Cruz, Sumulong Highway, Antipolo City, Rizal), with single-frequency network (SFN) relay towers located at BSA Suites in Makati; Summit One Tower in Mandaluyong; Guiguinto, Bulacan; Silang, Cavite; and Jalajala, Rizal.

== History ==
On January 5, 2022, the National Telecommunications Commission (NTC) awarded the frequencies Channel 2 and Channel 16 to Advanced Media Broadcasting System (AMBS) under a provisional authority. The channels were formerly owned by ABS-CBN Corporation under DWWX-TV.

In June 2022, AMBS Manila started its broadcast test.

In September 2022, Willie Revillame announced that the TV station would be named All TV. The station soft launched on September 13, 2022.

On April 15, 2024, AMBS entered into an acquired agreement with ABS-CBN to broadcast Kapamilya Channel and Jeepney TV feeds for the current and previous ABS-CBN programs on All TV with the latter's feed was later extended on January 2, 2026 which replaced the Jeepney TV block. The first programming to be aired upon Kapamilya Channel's airtime extension are Umaganda, Kapamilya Gold, and post-TV Patrol Primetime Bida timeslots, followed by the rest of Yes Weekend! from January 3 to 4, 2026.

In November 2025, the National Telecommunications Commission (NTC) issued Memorandum Circular No. 005-11-2025, establishing a 12-month transition period for analog television stations operating in Mega Manila. The covered area includes the National Capital Region and parts of Bulacan, Rizal, Laguna, Cavite, Pampanga and Bataan. In July 2026, the NTC identified November 22, 2026, as the target date for the Mega Manila analog switch-off. It was officially announced that ALLTV will switch off its analog TV broadcast on October 30, 2026, but the latter date discontinued, instead will switch off its analog TV broadcast on November 22, 2026 along with other Mega Manila analog TV stations. The analog shutdown date was extended by the NTC on November 17, 2026, from the original November 22, 2026, it became January 15, 2027.

== Digital channels ==
UHF Channel 16 (485.143 MHz)

Channel	Video	Aspect	Short name	Programming	Note
02.01	1080i	16:9	ALLTV HD	ABS-CBN sa ALLTV2 (Main DZMV-TV programming)	Commercial broadcast

== Areas of coverage ==
=== Primary areas ===
- Metro Manila
- Cavite
- Bulacan
- Laguna
- Rizal

=== Secondary areas ===
- Portion of Bataan
- Portion of Pampanga
- Portion of Nueva Ecija

== See also ==
- ABS-CBN Corporation
- DWWX-TV
- ABS-CBN
- All TV
- Advanced Media Broadcasting System
- Kapamilya Channel
- Jeepney TV

Preceded by DWWX-TV (1973-2020)	DZMV-TV; 2022–present	Incumbent
