= Roberto Benedicto =

Filipino businessman and crony of Ferdinand Marcos (1917–2000)

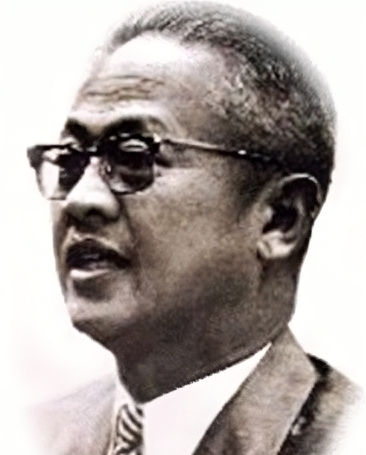

Ambassador of the Philippines to Japan
- In office 1972–1978
- President: Ferdinand Marcos
- Preceded by: José Laurel III
- Succeeded by: Carlos J. Valdés

Personal details
- Born: Roberto Salas Benedicto; April 17, 1917 La Carlota, Negros Occidental, Philippine Islands
- Died: May 15, 2000 (aged 83) Bacolod City, Philippines
- Resting place: Manila Memorial Park, Parañaque, Philippines
- Spouse: Julita Campos
- Children: 1
- Known for: Founder of Philippines Daily Express, Banahaw Broadcasting Corporation, and former owner of Radio Philippines Network and Intercontinental Broadcasting Corporation (both 1975–1986)
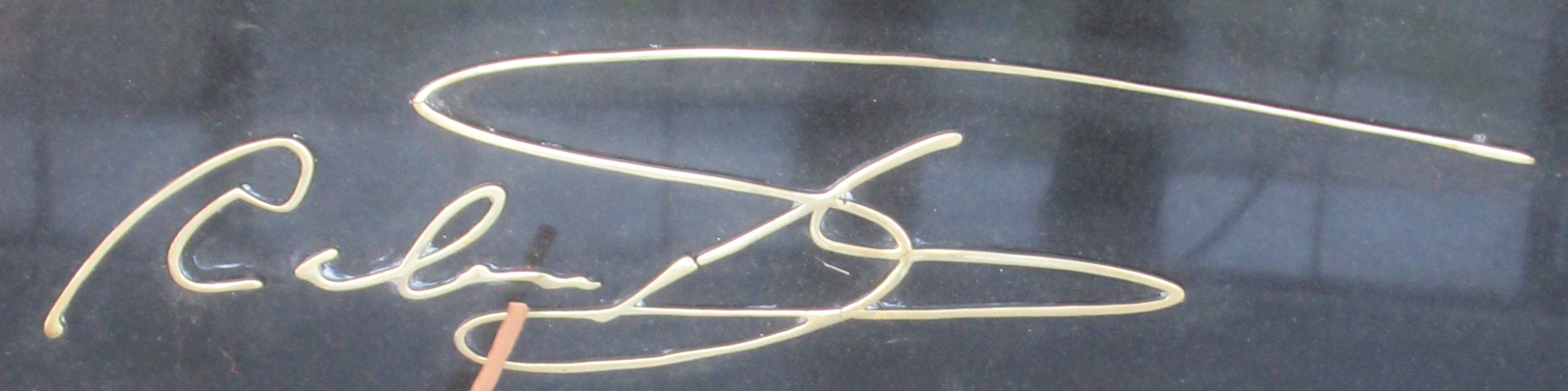
- Signature

Roberto Salas Benedicto (April 17, 1917 – May 15, 2000) was a Filipino lawyer, ambassador, diplomat, and banker historically most remembered as a crony of President Ferdinand Marcos. Benedicto owned Philippine Exchange Company, the Philippines Daily Express, Banahaw Broadcasting Corporation (BBC), Radio Philippines Network (RPN) and Intercontinental Broadcasting Corporation (IBC). Benedicto was the Philippines' ambassador to Japan from 1972 to 1978, and served as a member of the Cabinet Executive Committee from 1982 to 1986 to represent the political sector and Visayas.

At the prime of his career, Benedicto's business empire consisted of 85 corporations, 106 sugar farms, 14 haciendas, other agricultural lands, 17 radio stations, 16 television stations, two telecommunications networks, seven buildings, 10 vessels and five aircraft. He also owned 14 hectares of real estate in Bacolod City, 13.5 billion shares in Oriental Petroleum, and membership shares in golf and country clubs estimated at almost half a million US dollars. Overseas, he owned a sugar mill in Venezuela, a trading company in Madrid, bank deposits, mansions, and limousines in California. Marcos's executive secretary estimated that in 1983, Benedicto's net worth was $800 million.

== Early life and education ==
Benedicto, born in La Carlota, Negros Occidental on April 17, 1917, was a contemporary of Ferdinand Marcos, becoming his classmate and fraternity brother while studying at the University of the Philippines College of Law.

== Association with Ferdinand Marcos ==
Benedicto was Marcos's classmate at the UP Law School, and his Upsilon Sigma Phi fraternity brother.

When Marcos became president, Benedicto became part of his inner circle, one of the few with full access even to the private quarters inside Malacañang Palace. Marcos would eventually give power-of-attorney to Benedicto, allowing him to deal with corporations on the Marcoses' behalf.

=== Role in the creation of the Credit Suisse "Saunders Account" ===
It was with Benedicto's help that Ferdinand and Imelda Marcos opened their first Swiss Bank accounts in 1968, funneling money which the Swiss Federal Court would later determine to be "of criminal origin". This was the infamous "Saunders Account" with Credit Suisse, which Ferdinand Marcos signed under the false name of "William Saunders" and which Imelda Marcos signed as "Jane Ryan".

== Role and business interests during the Marcos administration ==
Benedicto's business interests grew significantly when Ferdinand Marcos became president. Marcos appointed him as the Philippines' Ambassador to Japan and put him in charge of the Philippine National Bank (PNB), the Philippines' largest state-owned bank.

=== Chairman of the Philippine National Bank ===
In his role as PNB Chairman, Benedicto permitted huge loans for business of other cronies and associates. He used PNB to grant loans for his shipping company, Northern Lines, and his sugar business. His role as PNB Chair enabled him to gain control of additional banks, and overcome business competitors by dictating the terms of loans.

=== Philippine Ambassador to Japan ===
Benedicto's appointment as Japanese ambassador allowed him to develop high-level contacts in Japan. He secured more than US$550M in World War II reparations, which he allegedly used to promote his private interests.

Working with President Marcos, they ratified the Treaty of Amity, Commerce and Navigation between Japan and the Philippines, which gave Japan most-favored nation status. This agreement gave Japan an advantage in using the country's natural resources, which was the primary reason the Philippine Senate did not ratify the treaty for 13 years.

His ambassadorship also gave him insider knowledge regarding the business interests of the Japanese, which allowed him to arrange lucrative joint-venture operations between Japanese corporations and his own.

When the Marcoses were exiled to the United States in February 1986, the American authorities confiscated papers that they brought with them. The confiscated documents revealed that since the 1970s, Marcos and his associates received commissions of 10 to 15 percent of Overseas Economic Cooperation Fund loans from about fifty Japanese contractors. These revelations became very controversial and became known in Japan as the Marukosu giwaku (マルコス疑惑) (transl. Marcos scandal). The lessons from the Marcos scandal were among the reasons why Japan created its 1992 ODA Charter.

=== Sugar monopoly ===
The most-notable expansion in Benedicto's business holdings during the Marcos dictatorship was in his establishment of a monopoly in the Philippines' sugar industry beginning in 1974, which earned him the moniker of "Sugar King".

Marcos's proclamation of martial law allowed Benedicto to take control of the Philippine Exchange Company (Philex), which monopolized local hacienderos' (sugar barons) international trade. Benedicto used Philex to buy cheap sugar from local producers and sell it abroad for large profits. Aided by Marcos's presidential decrees under martial law, Benedicto later seized control of the Philippine Sugar Commission, which accounted for 27% of the Philippines' dollar earnings at the time. In turn, a big segment of the profits from this sugar monopoly was deposited in a "special fund" which was "subject to the disposition of the president for public purposes."

=== Media monopoly ===
Martial law also gave Benedicto a media and telecommunications monopoly in the Philippines. His media empire that consisted of three television stations, 15 radio stations, a cable television company and a national newspaper called the Daily Express. Before martial law, he had transformed a small radio station DZBI that he owned in 1960 into the Kanlaon Broadcasting System (KBS) (now Radio Philippines Network).

In 1972, news and media outlets were forced to cease operations, and their facilities were taken over by the military. However, Benedicto was allowed to continue his broadcasts, to serve as the voice of the Marcos dictatorship. His newspaper, Philippines Daily Express, was the first to put out an edition after martial law was announced, three days later on September 25. This monopoly secured Benedicto's political ties with Marcos and generated income as the owner of the sole running television and radio stations. Benedicto assigned Enrique Romualdez, a relative of the first lady, as chief editor of the paper to ensure that it held the views of the regime.

KBS was the only full-color TV channel in the country at the time and it was later taken over by Imee Marcos. Benedicto expanded his media business by acquiring Intercontinental Broadcasting Corporation (IBC) which had five television stations, and nine radio stations. His growing media empire received government favors from the Marcos administration, with the president granting several Letters of Instruction (LOIs) for Benedicto's benefit. In 1977, Marcos issued LOI 640 to allow Banahaw Broadcasting Corporation, one of Benedicto's companies, to import $3 million worth of TV transmission equipment and facilities, without paying taxes or tariffs. The LOI also allowed tax-free importation of $15 million worth of 12-inch black-and-white television sets for the next five years, and allowed Banahaw to commission a local company to assemble the television sets, justifying that these sets would be distributed to "critical areas" at lower prices. The LOI then instructed government agencies to market the TV sets. The ministries of Public Information, National Defense, Education and Culture were instructed to use the sets for their public information and educational projects.

In 1982, Marcos issued LOI 640-A, to extend the scope and duration of the earlier order. The new instruction directed government ministries to distribute Benedicto's television sets in the countryside areas "on matters pertaining to peace and order". Due to the tax breaks, Benedicto was able to sell 12-inch black-and-white television sets cheaper than the competitors who had to pay taxes. The Consumer Electronic Products Manufacturers Association (CEPMA) complained that the television sets meant for rural areas were being sold in Manila, greatly affecting their market.

== Compromise deal with the Philippine government ==
Following Marcos' downfall in 1986, Benedicto entered into a compromise agreement with the Presidential Commission on Good Government in 1990, surrendering about US$16 million worth of Swiss bank deposits, shares in 32 corporations including "100% of the California Overseas Bank shares", cash dividends in his firms, and 51 percent of his agricultural land holdings.

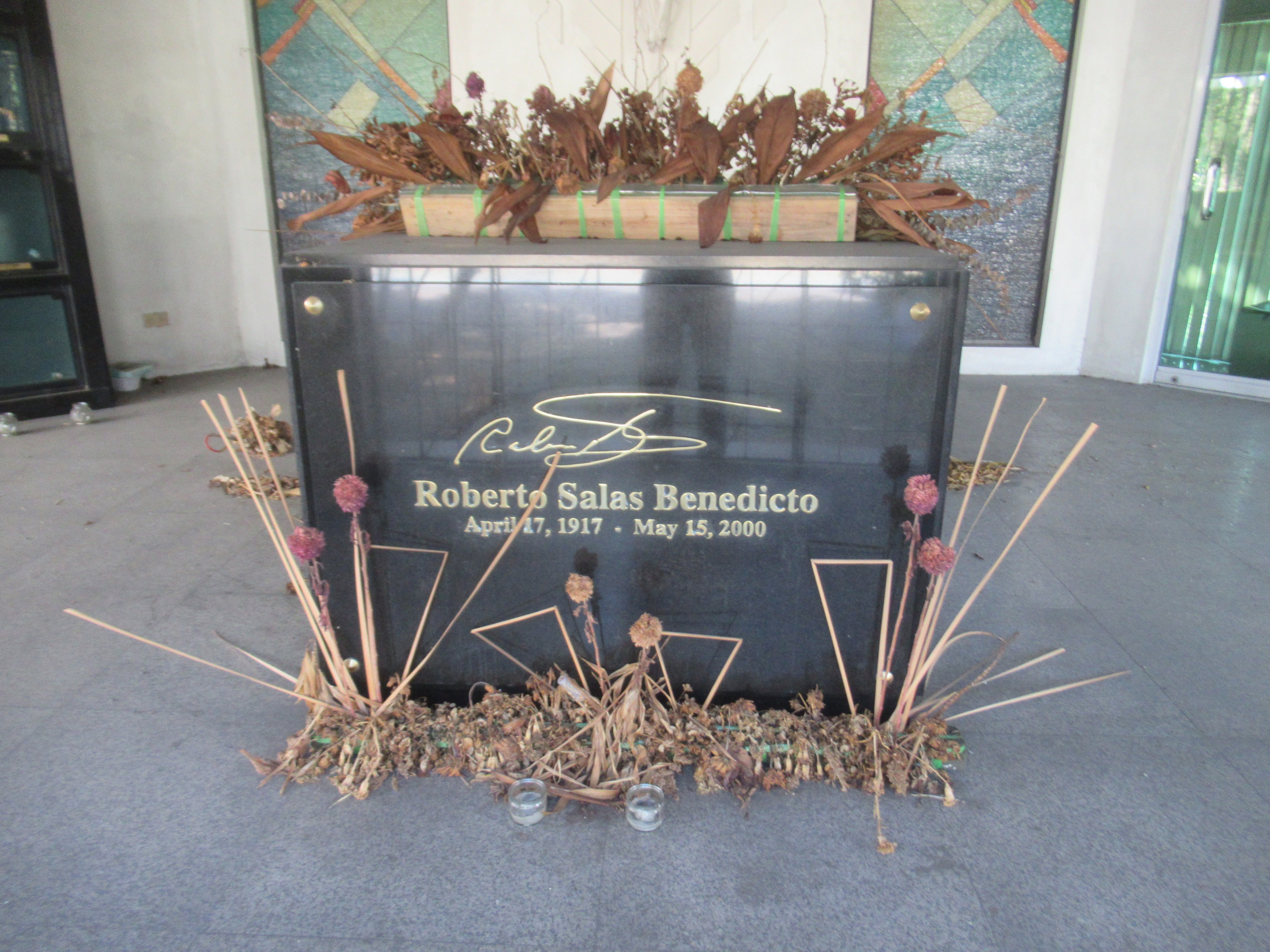
Benedicto's grave at Manila Memorial Park – Sucat.

== Death ==
Benedicto died on May 15, 2000, in Bacolod City, Philippines.

== See also ==
- Marcos Japanese ODA scandal
