= Intercontinental Broadcasting Corporation =

Philippine-based media company

- Type: Private (1959–1986); State agency (1986–present)
- Industry: Entertainment (1960–1986); State media (1986–present)
- Founded: October 1, 1959; 67 years ago
- Founder: Dick Baldwin
- Headquarters: IBC Compound, Lot 3-B, Capitol Hills Drive cor. Zuzuarregui Street, Barangay Matandang Balara, Diliman, Quezon City, Metro Manila, Philippines
- Area served: Nationwide
- Key people: Lino Cayetano (Secretary, Presidential Communications Office); Jose "Jimmie" C. Policarpio Jr. (President and CEO); Noel Malaya (Chair); Board of Directors: Catherina de Leon-Vilar; Jennifer Jurado; Miguel Damaso; Alexis Suarez; Roberto Ferrer; Jurel Anthony Ama; Corazon Reboroso (General Manager)
- Products: Television shows
- Services: Broadcasting; Radio; Television; Streaming
- Owner: Dick Baldwin (1959–1962); Soriano Group (1962–1975); Roberto Benedicto (1975–1986); Government of the Philippines (1986–present)
- Number of employees: 178
- Parent: Presidential Communications Office (1986–present)
- Divisions: IBC News and Public Affairs

IBC 13
- Type: Commercial broadcasting, radio and television
- Country: Philippines
- Broadcast area: Nationwide

Programming
- Languages: Filipino (main); English (secondary)
- Picture format: 16:9 1080i HDTV

Ownership
- Owner: Government of the Philippines (Presidential Communications Office)
- Parent: Intercontinental Broadcasting Corporation
- Sister channels: PTV

History
- Launched: October 1, 1959; 67 years ago (test broadcast); March 1, 1960; 66 years ago (official)
- Founder: Dick Baldwin
- Former names: Inter-Island Broadcasting Corporation (1960–1975); Islands TV-13 (1990–1992)

Links
- Website: ibctv13.com

Availability

Terrestrial
- Analog VHF/UHF: Listings may vary
- Digital VHF/UHF: Channel 17
- SkyCable (Metro Manila): Channel 15
- Converge Vision / SkyTV (Metro Manila): Channel 13
- Cablelink (Metro Manila): Channel 15
- Sky Direct (Nationwide): Channel 8
- Cignal TV (Nationwide): Channel 13
- SatLite (Nationwide): Channel 13
- G Sat (Nationwide): Channel 13

Intercontinental Broadcasting Corporation (IBC) is a Philippine free-to-air television and radio network based in Quezon City. It is a state broadcaster owned by the Government Communications Group as part of the Presidential Communications Office (PCO). IBC was also known as "The Kaibigan Network" (the Filipino term for "friend") from 2019 to 2023. That was dropped in favor of the government slogan "Bagong Pilipinas", which is shared with PTV.

IBC and the government-owned media companies People's Television Network and the Presidential Broadcast Service-Bureau of Broadcast Services are the media arm of the PCO, and it is a secondary state broadcaster primarily presenting education, culture, arts and sports programming. Its studios, offices and broadcast facilities are in Quezon City.

As a government-run station, IBC received funding from the General Appropriations Act (the annual national budget) and sales from blocktimers (purchasers of airtime), advertisers and others. IBC operates two digital television channels: Congress TV and Senate TV and radio station DWAN 1206 AM.

== History ==
=== Beginnings ===
Inter-Island Broadcasting Corporation was established on October 1, 1959, when DZTV Channel 13 in Manila aired a test broadcast. On March 1, 1960 at 6:30 pm, DZTV-TV 13 was launched. It became the country's third television station after the monopoly of DZAQ-TV of ABS and DZXL-TV of CBN, owned by the Lopez family's Bolinao Electronics Corporation (now ABS-CBN Corporation). Its original location was on the corner of P. Guevara St. (formerly Little Baguio) in San Juan from 1960 to 1978. American businessman Dick Baldwin was the station's first owner, and programming primarily consisted of programs from the American television network CBS and a few local shows.

Andrés Soriano Sr. of San Miguel Corporation acquired the network in 1962. Soriano was also the majority owner of the Radio Mindanao Network (RMN) and The Philippine Herald newspaper. Soriano's media interests were the Philippines' first tri-media organization. As the television arm of the RMN, it partnered with the RMN radio stations for coverage of the general elections of 1969 and 1971.

Between 1970 and 1972, IBC launched its color transmission system (Vinta Color, named after the vintas from Zamboanga) and was the third network in the Philippines to convert to all-color broadcasts after ABS-CBN and KBS. President Ferdinand Marcos imposed martial law on the country in September 1972, shutting down all television and radio networks except KBS (which was owned by Roberto Benedicto). A few months later, IBC was allowed to return to the air. ABS-CBN veteran Ben Aniceto was the station manager of DZTV Channel 13 from 1973 to 1976.

=== Benedicto years ===
The network was acquired on February 1, 1975 by Roberto Benedicto (who also owned Radio Philippines Network and Banahaw Broadcasting Corporation) from the Soriano group due to a constitutional prohibition of media ownership by non-Filipinos or by corporations not fully Filipino-owned. The company name was changed to Intercontinental Broadcasting Corporation. IBC launched an FM station, DWKB-FM, that year. The network introduced its vinta logo, two versions of which were used until 1978. Among its top-rated programs were the Metro-Goldwyn-Mayer Tarzan film series starring Johnny Weissmuller; the showbiz talk shows See-True and Seeing Stars, hosted by Inday Badiday and Joe Quirino respectively; and the comedies Iskul Bukol, Chicks to Chicks, and T.O.D.A.S.: Television's Outrageously Delightful All-Star Show.

With income generated by its programs, the network built and moved to Broadcast City with sister networks RPN and BBC in July 1978. The complex covers 55,000 m^{2} (590,000 sq ft) in Capitol Hills, Diliman, Quezon City.

=== After the People Power Revolution ===
In 1986, the People Power Revolution (also known as the EDSA Revolution) ousted Ferdinand Marcos and installed Corazon Aquino as president of the Philippines. After the revolution, IBC, RPN and BBC were sequestered and in turn nationalised by the Presidential Commission on Good Government (PCGG) for allegedly being part of the Marcos regime's crony capitalism. A board of administrators was created to run the networks.

Aquino turned IBC and RPN over to the Government Communications Group and, with an executive order, awarded BBC's Channel 2 to ABS-CBN. When BBC closed on March 20, 1986, the IBC and RPN absorbed most of its employees; this led to the doubling of the network's expenses and a three-fold increase in the cost of programming.

IBC rebranded in 1987 with a new slogan ("Life Begins at 13") and a butterfly logo formed from the letter E and the number 13. The network was struggling with increased competition from the other networks, particularly ABS-CBN (which rose to number one by 1988). IBC scored a victory when it acquired Loveli-Ness, starring Alma Moreno, from ABS-CBN in 1988. The cost of programs, talent fees and TV rights increased, however, until IBC could no longer afford to produce its own shows except for news and current-affairs programs and special events.

In 1989, IBC changed its slogan to "Pusong Pinoy, Pusong Trese" ("Heart of Filipino, Heart of Thirteen"). Advertising support began to decrease due to sequestration, internal problems, and management changes.

=== Islands TV-13 ===
By 1990, IBC 13 was last in the ratings. It inaugurated a new transmitter with an effective radiated power of 320 kW at the Coca-Cola plant in Roosevelt Avenue, San Francisco del Monte, Quezon City on February 23 of that year, providing a clearer and stronger signal to the greater Luzon area. Islands Broadcast Corporation, led by Alfonso Denoga and Gil Balaguer, took over IBC 13's management and marketing that October. The network was rebranded as "Islands TV-13" (pronounced on air as "Islands TV one-three").

In November 1990, IBC became a government-owned station with a compromise agreement between the PCGG and Roberto Benedicto. Ratings and income suffered due to mismanagement, causing labor unrest. In March 1993, the Makati City RTC issued an order terminating Islands Broadcast Corporation as IBC 13's marketing and sales agent due to unpaid financial obligations to the network.

=== Return to operations, Pinoy ang Dating, and Vintage Television ===
Logo from May 27, 1994, to December 31, 2001. The stylized "13" is a successor of the station logo used in the 1970s and 1980s.

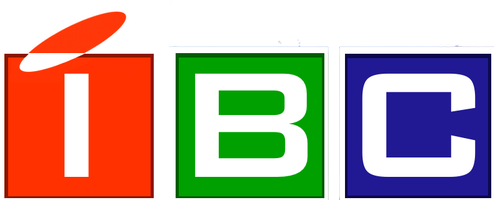
Logo from December 12, 2003, to late 2017 (on television from December 12, 2003, to June 4, 2011, and on signage of the Presidential Communications Operations Office in Quezon City from December 2003 to late 2017)

In October 1992, Islands TV-13 was rebranded as IBC. Management and marketing were returned to IBC's board of directors. IBC launched its new slogan, Pinoy ang Dating (Filipino for '"Filipino style"') with a Grace Nono music video on May 27, 1994. Programming improved, but the battle for audience share continued; advertisers became more responsive to marketing efforts. The following year, IBC began to broadcast nationwide via satellite.

Vintage Enterprises moved to IBC as part of the launch of Vintage Television (VTV), a primetime block which aired on IBC with PBA, Blow by Blow and other Vintage Sports-produced programs after moving from the People's Television Network (PTV) – another government-owned station – in February 1996. The block helped IBC-13 move to third place in the primetime ratings, primarily due to the PBA games. At that time, IBC installed a Harris 60-kilowatt transmitter in San Francisco del Monte (downgraded two years later to 50 kW) for clearer reception and began using the APSTAR 1 satellite to broaden its international reach. Viva Entertainment subsidiary Viva Television acquired Vintage Enterprises (including VTV on IBC) in 2000 and changed its name to Viva TV, a primetime IBC sports and entertainment block which continued until 2002. Rehabilitation of the transmitter and other technical facilities began for the network's flagship and provincial stations.

On September 2, 2000, IBC received a 25-year legislative franchise extension under Republic Act 8954 without President Joseph Estrada's signature; the bill became law after 30 days of inaction. IBC launched a new logo, station ID and slogan ("New Face, New Attitude") on January 1, 2002.

In early 2003, Viva TV cancelled after Viva decided not to renew its blocktime agreement with IBC due to high costs, low ratings, and the retirement of Bobong Velez as president and CEO of Viva-Vintage. The last Viva TV-produced program to air on IBC was the finale of Star for a Night on March 1, 2003. On December 12 of that year, IBC launched a new logo, slogan – "Ang Bagong Pilipino" ("The New Filipino") – and freestyle station ID. In late 2007, IBC signed Makisig Network as a primetime blocktimer.

=== Abandonment and privatization ===
After four decades, IBC-13's studios and other facilities were abandoned due to negligence and network mismanagement. Budgets were cut, making radio and television operations unaffordable. Programming and airtime had been lost after a late-1980s and -1990s network war, and many employees lost their jobs. The network owed more than ₱800 million in back wages to its employees, some of whom were elderly or had worked for the network since the 1980s. IBC had 200 employees by 2016, 29 of which were talent or employed on a contractual basis (especially in news, public affairs, and production).

Management unsuccessfully tried to revive the network, and there were several plans to sell and privatize IBC and Radio Philippines Network (RPN). ABS-CBN was planning to buy the network's blocktime to address signal problems, but could not join the privatization bid due to ownership regulations.

IBC entered a 2011 joint-venture agreement with Prime Realty, an affiliate of Reghis Romero Jr.'s R-II Builders Group, calling for the development of 3.5 hectares (8.6 acres) of Broadcast City. With the joint-venture agreement with a private company, the Benigno Aquino III administration wanted to privatize RPN and IBC and retain People's Television (PTV) as the sole government TV network. It was also announced that San Miguel Corporation would join the government-sponsored bidding for the privatization of RPN and IBC.

=== AKTV, privatization bids and property issues ===
IBC signed a blocktime agreement with TV5's sports division Sports5 to air live sports coverage via its sports programming block AKTV. It was launched on June 5, 2011, with the AKTV Run held outside SM Mall of Asia in Bay City, Pasay. On the same day, IBC launched a new logo and slogan "Where the Action Is" to reflect the change.

On April 11, 2013, MediaQuest Holdings chairman Manny Pangilinan announced that AKTV would not renew the blocktime agreement in May due to high costs, poor ratings, and doubts about IBC's future.

In 2012, pursuant to AO No. 26, IBC handed over its archives to Film Development Council of the Philippines (FDCP) for restoration.

IBC signed a memorandum of agreement with the Asian Television Content Corporation under Engr. Reynaldo Sanchez as the major blocktimer of the station. The ATC @ IBC primetime block with the newest programs premiered on June 2, 2014. However, on August 31, 2014, programs under the ATC @ IBC 13 block suddenly no longer aired on the network, possibly due to poor ratings and a lack of advertisers' support.

PCOO Secretary Herminio Coloma Jr. said in a Senate budget hearing for the PCOO last September 3, 2014, that the network would be fully privatized before President Aquino III stepped down from office in 2016 and PTV-4 would be kept as the sole government TV network. The privatization process would be managed by the Governance Commission for Government-Owned or -Controlled Corporations through the Development Bank of the Philippines. Business tycoon Manny V. Pangilinan was one of the possible bidders for the privatization, thus involving TV5 in the situation (TV5 being a media company under PLDT's MediaQuest Holdings through ABC Development Corporation). Despite the expiration of the blocktime agreement in 2013 (AKTV), the network is still using IBC's Broadcast City facilities for sports events, including its 2014 FIBA Basketball World Cup coverage. However, MediaQuest also could not join the privatization bid due to ownership rules and regulations, given MediaQuest owns TV5 and AksyonTV (now One Sports).

On June 2, 2015, the Philippine Crusader for Justice (PCJ), led by Joe Villanueva, filed a petition to the Supreme Court of the Philippines to nullify the joint venture agreement between IBC and Primestate/R-II Builders for the development of 3.5 hectares of Broadcast City, after the Office of the Ombudsman found the contract to be disadvantageous to the government. The Ombudsman filed a graft case in 2013 against former IBC executives and Primestate.

In January 2016, President Aquino III, through the Governance Commission for Government-Owned and -Controlled Corporations (GCG), approved the planned privatization of IBC. The privatization terms meant the IBC would undergo public bidding with an estimated floor price of ₱10 billion. The proceeds of the bidding would go towards state-owned PTV-4, to upgrade and modernize their broadcast capabilities. The Development Bank of the Philippines would be the financial adviser for the privatization. Incoming PCOO secretary Martin Andanar forwarded the privatization plan to President Rodrigo Duterte's executive secretary Salvador Medialdea. Andanar would also coordinate with the GCG before the start of the bidding.

The privatization process of IBC commenced in October 2016. As of December 2016, five entities had shown interest in joining the bidding. They were Ramon S. Ang of San Miguel Corporation, and the groups led by former IBC president (and current RMN president and chief executive officer) Eric Canoy, former Ilocos Sur governor Chavit Singson, energy tycoon and Udenna Corporation chairman Dennis Uy (who had recently expanded his business through his recent acquisition of ISM Communications Corporation), and Davao businessman William Lima.

In March 2017, IBC operated on a low-powered signal but it continued its broadcast on cable and satellite providers. In October 2017, IBC began its test broadcast on digital terrestrial television.

=== Relaunch, developments, and threatened shutdown ===
IBC began to revitalize its infrastructure and programming in late 2018 after president and chief executive officer Kat de Castro replaced Manolito O. Cruz, who died on October 10 of that year. By December 2018, the network moved its studios and offices to a new building adjacent to Broadcast City to make way for redevelopment of the Broadcast City property.

IBC announced a revamp of its programming on February 11, 2019, its first since the 2014 ATC@IBC block. It included reruns of IBC's old entertainment and cultural shows, the introduction of documentary and current-affairs programs airing on sister station People's Television Network and entertainment and sports content from SMAC Television Productions, ATC, and others. The network introduced two new slogans: "Iconic.Bold.Chill" and "Kaibigan Mo!"

The network announced its suspension of broadcasting selected regular programs in March 2020 due to President Rodrigo Duterte's implementation of an enhanced community quarantine in Metro Manila and Luzon in response to the COVID-19 pandemic. That May, PCO Secretary Martin Andanar announced that the network would broadcast educational television programs from the Department of Education's DepEd TV programming block on analog free-to-air. The test broadcasts aired from August 11 to August 21 and September 21 to September 25, 2020. Official broadcasts began on October 5, 2020, the starting date of classes in public schools nationwide. On December 2, 2021, the PCO, IBC and TAP Digital Media Ventures Corporation announced a deal with the Maharlika Pilipinas Basketball League (MPBL) for IBC to air its games (the 2021 MPBL Invitational only, since television coverage moved to One PH for the 2022-23 MPBL season).

IBC reconfigured to a 16:9 anamorphic widescreen standard-definition format on March 22, 2022, eliminating the use of letterboxing. The change allowed a widescreen presentation, optimizing the viewing experience with compatible widescreen televisions. Management announced on September 1 of that year that the network might cease operations in 2023 for several reasons, including financial difficulties. Employees and management demanded that the government give funds allocated for television operations to retired staff who had not been paid since 2009. The Department of Budget and Management allotted ₱187,189,000 from the 2023 national budget for the network, based on the General Appropriations Act of 2023, to continue broadcast operations and to pay employee salaries.

The House of Representatives renewed IBC's franchise for 25 years on January 31, 2023, permitting the network to continue operating until 2050. The TeleRadyo feed of DWAN 1206 was added as a digital subchannel on July 3, 2024, until it was subsequently replaced by Senate TV on October 1, 2026. On August 12, IBC signed a memorandum of agreement with The Manila Times. Congress TV's mirror feed from channel 14 was added as IBC's second digital subchannel on October 1.

President Bongbong Marcos signed Republic Act No. 12311 into law on October 3, 2025, renewing IBC's legislative franchise for 25 years. The law gave the network a franchise to construct, install, operate, and maintain for commercial purposes radio and television stations (including a digital television system), with corresponding facilities such as relay stations, throughout the Philippines.

== See also ==
- List of companies of the Philippines
- Philippine television networks
- Television channels
- Presidential Broadcast Service
