= DZTV-TV =

Television station in Metro Manila, Philippines

IBC TV-13 Manila (DZTV-TV)
- Metro Manila; Philippines
- City: Quezon City
- Channels: Analog: 13 (VHF) (until January 15, 2027; 53 days' time); Digital: 17 (UHF) (ISDB-T); Virtual: 13.01
- Branding: IBC 13

Programming
- Subchannels: 13.01: IBC; 13.02 Congress TV; 13.03 Senate TV

Ownership
- Owner: Intercontinental Broadcasting Corporation
- Sister stations: DWGT-TV (PTV); DWAN 1206 AM

History
- First air date: March 1, 1960
- Former channel numbers: Digital: 26 (UHF, 2017–2022)
- Call sign meaning: Television

Technical information
- Licensing authority: NTC
- Power: Analog: 50 kW; Digital: 5 kW
- ERP: Analog: 500 kW; Digital: 10 kW
- Transmitter coordinates: 14°36′12.5″N 121°10′03.7″E

Links
- Website: www.ibctv13.com

DZTV-TV (VHF channel 13 Analog, UHF channel 17 Digital) is a television station in Metro Manila, Philippines, serving as the flagship of the IBC network. It is owned and operated by the network's namesake corporate parent. The station maintains studios at the IBC Compound, Lot 3-B, Capitol Hills Drive cor. Zuzuarregui Street, Brgy. Matandang Balara, Diliman, Quezon City, while its hybrid analog and digital transmitting facility is located at 125 St. Peter Street, Nuestra Señora Dela Paz Subdivision, Santa Cruz, Antipolo, Rizal.

== Digital television ==
=== Digital channels ===
DZTV-TV's digital signal operates on UHF channel 17 (491.143 MHz) and broadcasts on the following subchannels:

| Channel | Video | Aspect | Short name | Programming | Note |
|---|---|---|---|---|---|
| 13.01 | 1080i | 16:9 | IBC HD | IBC (Main DZTV-TV programming) | Commercial broadcast |
| 13.02 | 1080i | 16:9 | Congress TV HD | Congress TV | Test Broadcast |
| 13.03 | 1080i | 16:9 | Senate TV HD | Senate TV | Test Broadcast |

NTC released implementing rules and regulations on the re-allocation of the UHF Channels 14-20 (470–512 Megahertz (MHz) band) for digital terrestrial television broadcasting (DTTB) service. All operating and duly authorized Mega Manila VHF (very high frequency) television networks are entitled to a channel assignment from Channels 14 to 20. On March 18, 2022, IBC began to transmit its digital test broadcast on UHF Channel 17 (491.143 MHz) as its permanent frequency assigned by NTC.

== Areas of coverage ==
=== Primary areas ===
- Metro Manila
- Cavite
- Bulacan
- Laguna
- Rizal

==== Secondary areas ====
- Pampanga
- Batangas
- Portion of Quezon
- Portion of Nueva Ecija
- Portion of Tarlac
- Portion of Zambales
- Portion of Bataan

== See also ==
- Intercontinental Broadcasting Corporation
- D-WAN 1206 AM
- List of Intercontinental Broadcasting Corporation channels and stations

| Preceded by None | DZTV-TV (1960–present) | Succeeded by Incumbent |
