= 2020 in Philippine television =

The following is a list of events affecting Philippine television in 2020. Events listed include television show debuts, finales, cancellations, and channel launches, closures and rebrandings, as well as information about controversies and carriage disputes.

== Events ==
=== January ===
- January 1
  - Diva and E! have ceased its operations by NBCUniversal International Networks across Southeast Asia due to the review of the management's decision through changes in business direction.
  - The Philippine feeds of Fox Networks Group-owned channels including Fox, Fox Life, Fox Movies and National Geographic (SD) were reverted to the main Southeast Asian feed with a local opt-out commercial feeds.
- January 3 - TV5 Network, Nation Broadcasting Corporation (NBC) Radyo5 92.3 News FM and Aliw Broadcasting Corporation (ABC) signed a memorandum of agreement for the expanded coverage of both the TV and radio networks nationwide. Selected DWIZ programs will be simulcast on the Radyo5 Network.
- January 4 - Jayson Nicolas, a former overseas worker in East Asia, emerged as the first BiyaHERO Grand Winner on It's Showtime.
- January 7 - Sony Pictures Television sold four owned channels (Animax, AXN, GEM and ONE) to KC Global Media Entertainment, and later completed on May 11.
- January 10–12 - The Philippines hosted the 24th Asian Television Awards.

=== February ===
- February 2 - Juan Gapang of Bacolod City (Singing) and Kenyo Street Fam of Bulacan (Dancing) hailed as Your Moment Grand Champions.
- February 4 - Robert P. Galang became the new president and CEO of TV5 Network and Cignal TV, replacing Jane Basas.
- February 5 - ASAP Natin 'To celebrated its 25th anniversary on Philippine television.
- February 6
  - ABS-CBN Films launched a new talent management arm, "Rise Artists Studio".
  - Balitanghali Weekend its celebrate 10th anniversary on Philippine television until it concluded on March 15, 2020.
- February 10 - Solicitor General Jose Calida filed a quo warranto petition on the Supreme Court of the Philippines against ABS-CBN Corporation and its subsidiary ABS-CBN Convergence for seeking to revoke the ABS-CBN's broadcast franchise over alleged violations of the company.
- February 14 - Ryan Sy won ₱1.1 million on It's Showtime's Piling Lucky.
- February 17 - TAP Digital Media Ventures Corporation rebranded three-owned channels: TAP Sports 1 to TAP Sports, TAP Sports 2 to TAP W and EDGEsport to TAP Edge, as well as launched two-owned channels: Premier Football and Premier Tennis.
- February 25 - Radio Philippines Network celebrated its 60th anniversary of broadcasting via CNN Philippines.
- February 29
  - After almost 3 years of broadcasting, Zee Sine has ceased its broadcast on pay TV by Essel Group due to programming redundancies, lack of advertising support and cost-cutting measures, as well as change in business direction.
  - Sky Cable terminated Paramount Channel on its line-up due to the expiration of Sky's contract with the network.

=== March ===
- March 1
  - GMA Network celebrated its 70th anniversary of broadcasting as a radio network.
  - Headstart with Karen Davila celebrated its 10th anniversary on Philippine television.
  - Intercontinental Broadcasting Corporation celebrated its 60th anniversary of broadcasting.
- March 8 - After one year of broadcast, 5 Plus rebranded as One Sports, coinciding with the start of the 2020 PBA season. It was the first MediaQuest Holdings through Nation Broadcasting Corporation free-to-air broadcast network and the first outside cable and satellite to use the "One" branding. In addition to transferring the name from cable to free-to-air, its cable and satellite counterpart has also been rebranded to One Sports+. Along with their sister network rebranding, One News and One PH updated a new updated logo, while 5 removed all ESPN–related references in the network's own sport division due to the rebranding of One Sports, with the website continued to run under the ESPN branding in partnership with The Walt Disney Company's GO Network.
- March 10–11 - During the COVID-19 pandemic that recently spread across the country, President Rodrigo Duterte's declaration as state of public health emergency and the World Health Organization's declaration as a pandemic, as well as local transmission of the coronavirus being present in the country, ABS-CBN and GMA Network announced the temporary suspension of their studio audience tapings for all of its shows, including the former's Magandang Buhay, It's Showtime, ASAP Natin 'To, Banana Sundae and the second season of I Can See Your Voice; and the latter's Mars Pa More, Eat Bulaga! (the first show suspending their live studio audience tapings on March 9), Wowowin (including its Saturday night primetime spin-off), Centerstage, Sarap, 'Di Ba?, The Boobay and Tekla Show and All-Out Sundays, as well as GMA News TV's Idol sa Kusina and Tonight with Arnold Clavio (which also been affected by the audience taping suspensions) as for the safety and well-being of the artists, crew and production teams. The aforementioned shows were continued to air in production without a studio audience as a precautionary measure.
- March 12 - The major sports leagues across the country announced a temporary suspension of games in an attempt to slow the spread of the coronavirus. The Philippine Basketball Association, the PBA Developmental League and the Philippine Super Liga announced an indefinite suspension of the league's activity, while the Maharlika Pilipinas Basketball League and the National Basketball League announced the suspension for the remainder of its playoffs. In addition, the National Collegiate Athletic Association and the University Athletic Association of the Philippines games were cancelled. The suspension of the five leagues affecting schedules of 5, One Sports, One Sports+, PBA Rush, S+A, Liga and Solar Sports.
- March 13 - The religious community has cancelled the majority of its Catholic masses and Christian worship services due to the pandemic. Religious programs were affected by the pandemic including ABS-CBN's The Healing Eucharist; PTV's Oras Ng Himala, Soldiers of Christ Healing on the Air and Jesus Miracle Crusade; 5's Misa Nazareno, Sambuhay TV Mass and The Word of God Network; CNN Philippines' TV Healing Mass for the Homebound; IBC's Family Appointment with El Shaddai and Feast TV; One Sports' Family TV Mass; S+A's Friends Again; Light TV's Jesus the Healer; SMNI's Sounds of Worship; and Life TV's Oras ng Katotohanan and The Lord's Day. The TV mass shows were continued to air without the churchgoers as a part of a precautionary measure.
- March 14 - ABS-CBN temporary suspended the productions of teleseryes and live entertainment shows including the episodes that were scheduled to complete effective March 15 as the COVID-19 pandemic continued to become a serious issue. Among of the primetime shows were affected including Pamilya Ko, FPJ's Ang Probinsyano, Make It with You and A Soldier's Heart, which were on hold from the schedule beginning March 16. Meanwhile, GMA Network also announced the suspension of productions on the network–produced teleseryes and live entertainment shows, as well as live entertainment shows co-produced by outside producers and blocktimers beginning March 15.
- March 16 - The Presidential Communications Operations Office began airing Public Briefing: #LagingHandaPH providing an official updates on the COVID-19 pandemic on PTV with simulcast on other media outlets through KBP-affiliated member stations.
- March 18
  - To replace the broadcast of Umagang Kay Ganda and all ABS-CBN Regional morning programming (which were ordered to halt in order to support government efforts to fight against COVID-19), ABS-CBN revived its weekday morning linkup with DZMM TeleRadyo for the first time in years as a provisional programming, leading to the nationwide television simulcast of all DZMM-AM programs including Garantisadong Balita, Kabayan and Radyo Patrol Balita Alas-Siyete.
  - The infomercial industry has been affecting their shipping and deliveries, as well as delayed orderings due to the enhanced community quarantine brought by the COVID-19 pandemic. As an emergency measure, two companies announced their temporary suspension of their informercials telecast: TV Shop Philippines (on Intercontinental Broadcasting Corporation and RJ DigiTV beginning March 19, as well as temporary shut down of its standalone channel on BEAM TV starting March 30) and EZ Shop (on Intercontinental Broadcasting Corporation, BEAM TV, 5, One Sports and GMA News TV beginning March 19, but their standalone channel exclusively on Cignal continued its broadcast). The other companies were continued to air infomercials including O Shopping (on ABS-CBN, S+A, Jeepney TV, and its own standalone network on Sky Cable, Sky Direct and ABS-CBN TV Plus including TV Plus Go) and Shop TV (on ETC and its standalone channel on selected cable and satellite providers).
  - GMA News TV temporary shut down its operations in support of the enhanced community quarantine, whereas all of its staff were moving to GMA and the moved of Dobol B sa News TV to the mother station as Dobol B sa GMA effective March 19 with the simulcast of Melo del Prado sa Super Radyo DZBB, thus marked the first radio-television simulcast since the 1990s radio-TV program Kape at Balita. The Melo del Prado sa Super Radyo DZBB portion (which served as a lead-in to Unang Hirit) aired on March 19 and 20. On March 20, the mother network announced its decision to reverse the suspension for the remainder of its weekday and the entire weekend morning line-ups (with the exception of Yo-kai Watch–which temporary replaced by Sambuhay TV Mass beginning March 22 and Agripreneur, Kapwa Ko Mahal Ko and In Touch with Dr. Charles Stanley–all suspended from airing beginning March 21) due to the sister channel's resumption on March 21. Then on March 21, the English language newscast GMA Regional TV Weekend News was also moved to the mother network. Later on March 23, the two networks began simulcasting Super Balita sa Umaga Nationwide and Saksi sa Dobol B while Unang Hirit was on hiatus. The temporary, weekday-only joint network simulcast of Dobol B sa GMA/News TV ended on April 8 when Unang Hirit resumed on April 13 following the Holy Week break, while the temporary only broadcast of GMA Regional TV Weekend News ended on April 25, a week before its return to the sister network on May 2.
  - In an unprecedented move following an employee from a company working in the Corporate World Center in Mandaluyong has diagnosed with the virus, CNN Philippines temporary shut down its broadcast for days to allowed for a disinfection works on its studios and control rooms. To compensated, selected programming was broadcast nationally through the channel's social media pages.
  - As an emergency measure, ABS-CBN News Channel temporarily simulcasted DZMM TeleRadyo's programming to local and international viewers but with its own commercials, cutting the feed for the channel's flagship, Top Story.
- March 19
  - DZMM TeleRadyo temporary stopped the replay broadcast of ABS-CBN News and Current Affairs programming at 1 p.m. from Mondays to Fridays (which began Monday as a result of the decision for the temporary halt broadcast of Good Vibes) and replaced by the news simulcast from ABS-CBN News Channel in another unprecedented decision, thus DZMM became the first radio station in many years since the end of English broadcast on DZRJ-AM in the 2010s to aired English-language news programming on the AM brand and by extension DZMM TeleRadyo became a pioneer in airing bilingual (Filipino and English) news programming in both cable and digital free-to-air television. The English broadcast aired from 1 p.m. (after Headline Pilipinas) to 5 a.m. on Tuesdays, Thursdays and Sundays, with ANC's relay of DZMM TeleRadyo programming on Mondays, Wednesdays, Fridays and Saturdays (Mondays, Wednesdays and Fridays starting at 6 a.m. following Early Edition), with a break at 9 a.m. for Market Edge during trading days in the Philippine Stock Exchange and 5 p.m. for Top Story. With this decision, DZMM TeleRadyo aired The World Tonight for the first time on free-to-air digital television on Tuesday, Thursday and Sunday nights for the first time since 1999, while both were already taking a 6:30 p.m. break for the live simulcast of TV Patrol (weekdays only). The simulcast of the former resumed on free-to-air television almost 6 years later, this time via All TV, on January 2, 2026.
  - CNN Philippines adopted the video technology services of TVU Networks for local broadcast.
- March 20
  - One News Now (which also made its first broadcast on 5) became the first English-language news broadcast since the end of the delayed broadcast of The Big Story. It also marked the first primetime English-language newscast since 2007-08's Sentro to broadcast. Meanwhile, the network's flagship newscast, Aksyon (in its noontime and primetime editions) has officially retired after almost a decade, while the network's simulcast of One Balita (from One PH) and Morning Calls (from Radyo 5 92.3 News FM and One PH) were on hold in support of the government efforts to fight against COVID-19. The primetime portion ended on May 6, when the network temporarily revived the One PH program One Balita Pilipinas on May 7, while the noontime portion ended on May 29, when One Balita resumed on June 1.
  - DZMM TeleRadyo made history with the use of video technology from Zoom Video Communications for the Friday night broadcast of Labor of Love, and Saturday morning to afternoon broadcast of Tandem: Lima at Logan, Magpayo Nga Kayo, Konsyumer ATBP., Usapang Kalye, Good Job and Omaga-Diaz Report simulcast on ANC, making it a pioneer (and third overall) among the country's news channels.
  - BEAM TV temporarily went off the air due to the enhanced community quarantine amid the COVID-19 pandemic.
- March 21
  - GMA News TV resumed it broadcast with an expanded Dobol B sa News TV broadcast as provisional programming.
  - After a year and 5 months of broadcasting, Pop Life TV ceased broadcasting due to the enhanced community quarantine amid the COVID-19 pandemic.
- March 22
  - As part of the network's 70th anniversary, GMA launched the online-only Buong Puso Para sa Pilipino No-Contract Show, a weekly virtual entertainment-show-cum-fan-meet-up with network talents to raise funds for relief efforts for people affected by the enhanced community quarantine in Luzon and all the medical workers, as well as to give back to its loyal viewers and listeners in radio and television for seven decades.
  - DZMM TeleRadyo moved to full 24/7 provisionally broadcast on digital free-to-air and cable, with ANC programming being aired on Sunday late nights until 4:30 a.m. on Mondays.
  - Sambuhay TV Mass provisionally moved to GMA from 5 with a 6:00 a.m. broadcast slot on Sundays, became the channel's first Catholic TV Mass broadcast since the Family TV Mass in 2014–15. To replace the former program, 5 debuted the television delayed broadcast of Misa sa Veritas (via Radio Veritas) on Sunday late afternoon.
- March 23
  - CNN Philippines resumed its operations with the special coverage of the special session of both chambers of Congress as the highlight.
  - As an emergency measure, Net 25 extended (at the cost of certain programs) the airing times of Agila Balita, Agila Probinsiya, the midday Agila Pilipinas and the primetime Mata ng Agila, as well as the Filipino and English-language editions of Eagle News International.
  - Eat Bulaga! began including footage from the program's first 40 years in television (including the past 24 seasons on GMA) on its provisional rerun episodes. The rerun episodes ended on June 6, when the show plans to resume its audience-free live episodes on June 8.
- March 25
  - ABS-CBN Channel 2 programming (due to the decision to temporary stop the selected TV Patrol regional broadcast as a result of government efforts to fight against COVID-19 countrywide) began airing the selected television stations of the Regional Network Group (Channel 46 Pampanga, Channel 7 Palawan and Channel 4 Davao) in full via satellite as a provisional measure, with their regional reporters temporarily responsible to the national headquarters in Quezon City through local news bureau chiefs, while all local advertising remained. This includes Magandang Buhay and It's Showtime (which resumed broadcast at the time), which were live nationwide from the homes of the presenters through the Zoom platform, a first in Philippine television history. Both the status of Palawan and Davao stations ended on April 20, when said broadcast in these markets resumed on the said date.
  - While ABS-CBN Channel 7 Palawan local programming took a pause, TV Patrol Palawan became the first-historic regional TV Patrol broadcast to air live via the channel's social media sites from Mondays to Fridays.
- March 26 - ABS-CBN Channel 11 Naga provisionally became a semi-satellite of Channel 2 Metro Manila as TV Patrol Bicol temporarily stopped broadcast while retaining local advertisement slots for its stations over the Bicol Region. The status ended on March 30, when the broadcast resumed airing.
- March 27 - A public demand forced ABS-CBN to reduce the Saturday morning movie blocks into one film only to give way the morning time slot (8:30 a.m. to 10 a.m.) for its award-winning Educational Television produced programming (Bayani, Hiraya Manawari and Sine'skwela) courtesy of the cable and digital free-to-air channel Knowledge Channel to serve the millions of pre-school and elementary students whose studies as a result of the pandemic and the quarantines imposed by many local governments (as well as the Luzon-wide enhanced community quarantine) have been interrupted, while also aiming to introduced the channel and its valuable work to millions of viewers nationwide with the provisional educational programming began on March 28. Later on, both Bayani and Hiraya Manawari aired on Sundays as well as a lead-in to MathDali at 9:15 a.m. beginning April 12.
- March 30 - One Sports temporarily suspended its broadcast due to limitations brought by the Enhanced Community Quarantine in Luzon, with its sister networks 5, One Sports+ and PBA Rush took over some of its archived programming, except for other programs such as Talking Heads (which moved to BEAM TV beginning May 16).

=== April ===
- April 1
  - ABS-CBN's TV Patrol became the fourth national newscast to incorporate simultaneous sign language interpretation for the deaf and hard of hearing on its broadcast in addition to closed captioning, following 5's lead years before with its News5 newscasts. Previously, sign language interpretation has been available in the regional TV Patrol editions in Palawan and Central Visayas.
  - After 14 years and 9 months of broadcasting, Jack TV has ceased its commercial broadcast on pay TV by Solar Entertainment Corporation due to programming redundancies, lack of advertising support and cross-cutting measures as well as change in business direction during the COVID-19 pandemic in the Philippines. Meanwhile, it continued as a digital web portal on their official online media platforms, while most of the programming being planned to migrate in either ETC or Solar Sports.
  - Front Row Channel (which is the Philippine version of a global TV network of the same name) was officially launched by the joint venture between Solar Entertainment Corporation and Jungo TV, which is distributed by GMA Network, as the 24-hour music channel that specialized in broadcast of live concerts with featured performances from the world's top musical acts. While it has been initially launched in other cable providers, the channel hasn't been placed in the lineups of major cable systems and satellite providers.
  - Kuwentuhang Lokal and Pasada 630 became the first DZMM TeleRadyo programs to fully aired with productions using the Zoom platform.
  - DZMM Radyo Patrol 630 and DZMM TeleRadyo switched to simultaneous telecast with the English-language ABS-CBN News Channel starting at 10:00 p.m. as DZMM temporarily suspended its regular programming after asking all concerned on-duty personnel to go on self-quarantine for 14 days following their exposure to two "persons under investigation", while to those who have not been exposed shall work from home with its studio and facilities have been vacated and immediately disinfected. With this move, DZMM and DZMM TeleRadyo, as well as the regional AM radio stations DYAP and DXAB, became an English-only broadcast (for the first time in history after many years) as a provisional measure. From 5:30 p.m. to 10 p.m., the channel aired the best of ABS-CBN News and Current Affairs programming in their place with a 6:30 p.m. break for TV Patrol.
  - After almost two years, DisneyLife ceased its operations by The Walt Disney Company in the Philippines, due to the upcoming launch of Disney+ in the country on November 17, 2022. The service was originally launched as an all-in-one streaming service in 2018 with Globe Telecom as a partner provider, replacing the TV streaming apps: "Watch Disney Channel", "Watch Disney Junior" and "Watch Disney XD" (which all launched as part of Globe Telecom's partnership in 2015 where it later replaced the "Watch" name to the "App" name on all three services in 2016) for the Philippines.
  - After past three years, Fox+ ceased its operations by Fox Networks Group in the Philippines due to cross-cutting measures as well as change in business direction. The ad-free subscription service was originally launched locally in 2017 as a merger of the company's three streaming services: "Fox Play", "Fox Movies Play" and "Fox Sports Play" for the Philippines, with PLDT, Inc. alongside its sister companies Smart Communications and Cignal TV as a founding provider partners and later with Globe Telecom as an additional provider partner in 2018. With the service was eventually acquired by The Walt Disney Company as a sister streamer to DisneyLife in 2019, the PLDT Group announced that would back out as a provider partner in August in the same year, leaving Globe as the only provider partner for the Philippines until its closure. Following the closure, the subscribers have encourage to continue watching these shows, movies, documentaries and live sporting events on the company's linear TV networks after on that date.
- April 2
  - With the switch to the English broadcast on ANC as a result of the decision to suspend DZMM's programs, DYAB TeleRadyo provisionally introduced English-language broadcast via ANC in select hours, in combination with TV Patrol and the Cebuano-language programming aired on the channel. Also, the ANC simulcast provisionally began airing on both ABS-CBN (from 5 a.m. to 8 a.m.) and S+A (from 8 a.m. to 10 a.m.), thus bringing the special editions of Early Edition and Headstart as well as Market Edge (the two programs were only aired on S+A via simulcast). The broadcast were the first English news broadcast on both channels after many years.
  - Following TV Patrol's lead the previous night, ANC's Dateline Philippines added the simultaneous sign language interpretation for the deaf and hard of hearing viewers who watch the channel, thus marked the first ANC telecast to utilize it.
- April 3 - DZMM TeleRadyo resumed its transmissions, with almost all programming and field reports aired via the Zoom platform, but with ANC commercials instead of the channel's commercials. ANC graphics for news stories, as well as for reporter and presenter introductions, debuted with the Headline Pilipinas broadcast, beginning on April 4, and the Saturday edition.
- April 5–8 - In the wake of the cancellation of this year's APT Entertainment Holy Week Drama Special which was supposed to be aired via GMA on April 11 due to the COVID-19 pandemic, 5 re-aired the previous Lenten Drama Specials produced by APT, including Milagroso from 2006 and May Milagroso Pa Nga Ba? from 2002 (retitled May Milagroso Pa Nga Ba? (Part 1)-Ang Hiling, May Milagroso Pa Nga Ba? (Part 2)-Sister Choleng and May Milagroso Pa Nga Ba? (Part 3)-Awit ni Miling for its re-airing).
- April 6
  - TV Patrol officially made history with the first news reports aired using the Zoom platform.
  - ABS-CBN and Star Cinema (through Star Creatives) launched an online entertainment program, Rise and Shine, aired on Facebook midday on Mondays, Wednesdays and Fridays (with a same day encore on YouTube) with DJ Jhai Ho (the presenter of the Sunday Showbiz Pa More! on Jeepney TV) hosted the program.
  - Inquirer 990 Television resumed its broadcast after a three-week break.
- April 9–11 - By virtue of a partnership between the Church of Jesus Christ of Latter-day Saints in the Philippines, GMA Network and ABS-CBN Corporation (given the effects of the enhanced community quarantine in Luzon and many other provinces) aired the 190th General Conference of the Church of Jesus Christ of Latter-Day Saints from the Conference Center in Temple Square, Salt Lake City, Utah, USA and being broadcast countrywide through both free-to-air and cable via GMA and DZMM TeleRadyo with simulcast on ABS-CBN News Channel (for April 9 and 11 only) during the Easter Triduum period, marked the first time via satellite delay (the Music and the Spoken Word conference edition was aired via GMA on April 11).
- April 10
  - The 2020 edition of SVD-Mission Communications Foundation's Seven Last Words from the Diocesan Shrine and Parish of Jesus, the Divine Word at Christ the King Mission Seminary in Quezon City was cancelled due to the COVID-19 pandemic, and it was originally televised live on both ABS-CBN and DZMM TeleRadyo with a delay on Jeepney TV. In lieu of the special, ABS-CBN aired The Young Messiah movie and the network–produce Ang Pitong Huling Salita special in its place.
  - For the first time in its 27-year history on television, The Dominican Fathers of the Philippines' Siete Palabras has switched to the pre-recorded format this year, which was originally to aired live from the Sto. Domingo Church in Quezon City but it was scrapped due to the COVID-19 pandemic. The special was televised for the 12th year by GMA Network (with selected GMA Regional TV stations in Visayas and Mindanao pre-empting the national special with the local versions of the said special), and the simulcast on Radyo Veritas in Manila and other Catholic Media Network radio stations nationwide.
- April 12 - ABS-CBN provisionally moved two Nickelodeon programs: SpongeBob SquarePants and The Loud House, to 7:30 a.m. and 7:50 a.m. on Sunday (following Swak na Swak) as a result of an expansion to the network's educational television programming supplied by the cable and digital free-to-air channel, Knowledge Channel beginning at 8:15 a.m.
- April 13
  - The commercial feeds of both ANC and DZMM TeleRadyo on Mondays, Wednesdays, Fridays and Saturdays were separated after days of using a singular commercial feed. In addition, DZMM (and DZMM TeleRadyo) resumed the use of its radio studios following disinfection measures, with SRO: Suhestyon, Reaksyon at Opinion as the first broadcast to aired.
  - GMA News TV resumed its evening broadcast of its own public affairs and documentary programming and the BBC Natural History Unit's Planet Earth II, while retaining the provisional Dobol B sa News TV afternoon broadcast and 24 Oras simulcast. Later on April 18, five lifestyle programs were also resumed.
- April 20
  - After 4 weeks, the timesharing of programming between both DZMM TeleRadyo and ANC ended, with ANC resumed its separate programming on Mondays and DZMM slowly resumed its broadcast from the radio studios.
  - GMA Network's 24 Oras became the fifth national newscast to incorporate simultaneous sign language interpretation for the deaf and hard of hearing in its broadcast. In addition, its online livestream on YouTube converted its airing in full high definition, making it the third in the country.
- April 21 - Infomercial company O Shopping temporary suspended its broadcast on ABS-CBN due to the enhanced community quarantine during the COVID-19 pandemic in the Philippines, thus became the third infomercial company to suspend their broadcast, following TV Shop Philippines and EZ Shop (both of which previously announced their broadcast suspensions in the previous month). However, the broadcast continued to air on S+A, Jeepney TV and its own standalone network on Sky Cable, Sky Direct and ABS-CBN TV Plus (including TV Plus Go). With that, ABS-CBN reverted to signing off at midnight, with signing-on before the broadcast of Kapamilya Daily Mass (and effective May 4, the replay broadcast of ABS-CBN News and Current Affairs programming) on Mondays to Fridays at 4:20 a.m. (with Jesuit Communications Foundation produced show Kape't Pandesal preceding it), Saturdays at 5:25 a.m. and before The Healing Eucharist on Sundays at 5:55 a.m.
- April 23 - Net 25, the television network of Iglesia ni Cristo-affiliated company Eagle Broadcasting Corporation, celebrated its 20th anniversary of broadcasting.
- April 25–26 - With the termination of the timesharing policies of both DZMM TeleRadyo and ANC, both stations resumed its separate weekend programming schedules. Meanwhile, on DZMM TeleRadyo, music-related programs (Yesterday and Remember When), news-related shows (Sagot Ko 'Yan! and Red Alert) and the public affairs program (Tulong Ko, Pasa Mo) resumed its broadcast on April 26 after a month long hiatus.
- April 29 - For the first time in weeks, ABS-CBN readjusted its mid-morning and midday programming with a new provisional expansion of its movie block with two films starting at 10 a.m. and 11:45 a.m. respectively, resulting in It's Showtime being moved to 1:30 p.m. with a reduced one-hour run for the first time in its 11-year run of the show.
- April 30 - After past five years, HOOQ ceased its operations by Singtel, Sony Pictures and Warner Bros. across all countries, including the Philippines, after the provider filed for liquidation on March 27. Meanwhile, Korean-based company Coupang announced the purchase of HOOQ's assets on July 10.

=== May ===
- May 1 - ABS-CBN announced that the simulcast of Kabayan and Radyo Patrol Balita Alas-Siyete via DZMM TeleRadyo ended its airing nationwide to give way for the return of Umagang Kay Ganda and all the ABS-CBN Regional Network Group morning programs in regional areas (except for Palawan and Southern Tagalog) beginning May 4.
- May 2 - Infomercial company EZ Shop resumed its broadcast on Intercontinental Broadcasting Corporation after two months of suspension due to the enhanced community quarantine during the COVID-19 pandemic in the Philippines, thus became the first company to partly resumed its broadcast. Meanwhile, the company remained suspend its broadcast on BEAM TV, 5, One Sports and GMA News TV.
- May 5 - Most of ABS-CBN's free TV and radio broadcasting operations from ABS-CBN Corporation including ABS-CBN Channel 2, MOR 101.9, DZMM Radyo Patrol 630 and its television counterpart (later renamed as TeleRadyo due to DZMM's sign off at 8:20 p.m. and returned on May 8 in digital free-to-air and cable providers, as well as in online platforms), S+A, its regional stations, the free-to-air operations of Jeepney TV, Knowledge Channel, Myx and O Shopping, Asianovela Channel, and Movie Central signed off the air at 7:52 p.m. due to the cease-and-desist order of the National Telecommunications Commission to temporary stop the broadcast operations of ABS-CBN Corporation because of the expiration of its franchise granted on March 30, 1995. Meanwhile, the live channel streaming broadcast of ABS-CBN and DZMM TeleRadyo were unavailable via iWant on the same day with O Shopping and ABS-CBN News Channel took over as temporary replacement of the streaming channels. And finally, Creative Programs owned pay TV channels (Cinema One, Liga, Metro Channel, Myx and Jeepney TV), ABS-CBN News Channel, Cine Mo!, Knowledge Channel, O Shopping and Yey! remain unaffected in some digital terrestrial television and direct-to-home providers, including their standalone pay-per-view channel Kapamilya Box Office, which is also available for ABS-CBN TV Plus, Sky Cable and Sky Direct subscribers.
- May 6 - A day after the final broadcast on free-to-air, ABS-CBN formally announced that due to demand from the overseas audiences on The Filipino Channel, TV Patrol has resumed its broadcast on the said channel effective May 7 after a two-day break live in all TFC platforms (including online, cable and satellite feeds), thus continuing a tradition of broadcasting to Filipinos abroad since 1989. In addition, the live broadcast of the newscast through online platforms and ABS-CBN News Channel would also continued beginning on the same day, with the channel provisionally shouldering the program's airing and production.
- May 7 - Aside from the announcement about the return of TeleRadyo, ABS-CBN also announced that all TV Patrol regional editions has resumed its broadcast via Facebook Live through their respective pages effective May 8.
- May 8 - Knowledge Channel temporarily shut down its free-to-air broadcast on ABS-CBN TV Plus due to the cease-and-desist order of the NTC to close down its broadcasting operations of ABS-CBN. Meanwhile, the channel continued its broadcast on cable providers.
- May 12 - In yet another ABS-CBN announcement, all ABS-CBN Regional Network Group morning programming has resumed airing but for online-only to regional viewers starting at 7 a.m. on May 13 through Facebook Live.
- May 14 - ABS-CBN launched a new online service, Online Kapamilya Shows (OKS), as the digital-only content can be accessed.
- May 15 - GagaOOLala, a streaming service owned by Portico Media Co., Ltd., was expanded to all territories except China and North Korea, including the Philippines.
- May 16
  - BEAM TV resumed its regular programming.
  - Aside from the resumption of BEAM TV's broadcast, infomercial company EZ Shop announced the resumption of its broadcast on the said channel starting on the same day, a few weeks after the company resumed its telecast via Intercontinental Broadcasting Corporation on May 2. Meanwhile, other networks such as 5, One Sports and GMA News TV remained suspend the telecast of the said company.
  - TV Shop Philippines announced the resumption of its broadcast on RJ DigiTV only after a two-month break due to the enhanced community quarantine during the COVID-19 pandemic in the Philippines, thus became the second company to partly resumed its broadcast.
- May 22 - One PH, a Filipino-language news and talk channel from Cignal, started its test broadcast on digital terrestrial television as a subchannel of 5 (via DWET-TV).
- May 25 - ETC (owned by Solar Entertainment Corporation) has switched its airing of aspect ratio format quality on the channel feed and its programming to widescreen format (16:9) as being converted its mitigation of reception through digital signal reception through free TV and other cable and satellite providers after almost 25 years on the usage of broadcast video picture resolution that migrated from fullscreen format (4:3).
- May 26–July 9 - the 18th Congress of the Philippines, particularly on the House of Representatives through the Joint Committees on Legislative Franchises, Good Government and Public Accountability, tackled the franchise applications of ABS-CBN for the renewal of its existing franchise, which was expired on May 4.

=== June ===
- June 1 - Due to insistent public demand, Asianovela Channel and Jeepney TV restarted its free-to-air broadcast on ABS-CBN TV Plus while still on free trial as the two channels were assigned as temporary replacement served for ABS-CBN and S+A.
- June 4 - Following the announcement by the Inter-Agency Task Force for the Management of Emerging Infectious Diseases to allow the mass gatherings on churches in General Community Quarantine and Modified General Community Quarantine areas nationwide as well as the statement of ABS-CBN and The Healing Eucharist official Facebook page to temporary stop the admission of studio audience on its Sunday broadcast (live and recorded telecast on Jeepney TV and TeleRadyo) due to the COVID-19 outbreak, The Healing Eucharist - Sunday TV Mass production team announced the temporary suspension of the live audiences admission within four consecutive Sundays effective June 7 to 28.
- June 5 - Liza Soberano's manager Ogie Diaz took an address to the queries of the fans that Make It with You has been cancelled, thus not being included in the lineup of ABS-CBN shows that scheduled to air on the newly announced pay TV channel.
- June 7 - Some ABS-CBN programs (mostly from ABS-CBN News and Current Affairs such as Kuha Mo!, Mission Possible, S.O.C.O.: Scene of the Crime Operatives and Umagang Kay Ganda) continued to deliver new and fresh episodes through online.
- June 12 - During the special coverage of the 122nd Independence Day celebration on People's Television Network, the infographic made a mistake in regarding the picture of the first president Emilio Aguinaldo and the mention of the Katipunan supreme leader Andres Bonifacio. The network later apologized for the error during the coverage and it was later revised with the correct picture of Andres Bonifacio and the mention of Emilio Aguinaldo on the network's social media pages. According to the statement, the error causing the management of the said network that they needed skills development and necessary training to be initiated.
- June 13
  - Following the Independence Day and in celebration of 74 years since its corporate formation, ABS-CBN began its phased return to full broadcasting on launching a cable and satellite-only channel, Kapamilya Channel (which is also the 2nd incarnation of the same name after it used as an international channel in 2007 replacing Pinoy Central TV before rebranding to BRO in 2011), thus officially resumed the broadcast of entertainment, educational, news and current affairs programming from ABS-CBN which was stopped due to the shutdown of its free-to-air television amid the legislative franchise lapsed. This was announced through TV Patrol on its June 4 broadcast, with its official launch video also debuted on the same program a day later.
  - As part of a longer morning educational television block launch, Knowledge Channel and some of ABS-CBN's legendary award-winning educational programs, officially began airing via Kapamilya Channel on weekends starting today and on June 14 with its purpose to help the educational needs of millions of Filipino children and youth from both public and private educational institutions in the pre-school and elementary levels during the COVID-19 pandemic.
  - ABS-CBN's RGE Drama Unit announced the cancellation of Pamilya Ko with no reason was given, a week after the cancellation of Make It With You due to the health concerns of its lead actress Liza Soberano, as well as the enhanced community quarantine in Luzon and the ABS-CBN franchise renewal controversy.
- June 14
  - GMA Network, Inc. celebrated its 70th anniversary of corporate formation.
  - Movie Central resumed its partial broadcast as a programming block via Kapamilya Channel after a month of halt broadcast due to the lapsed of its broadcast franchise.
- June 15
  - Cignal TV launched a brand new 24/7 movie and drama channel on satellite television, One Screen, which featured films from local features, dubbed Hollywood films and European movies (in its original language) supplied by Cinemaworld, as well as dramas from North America and local content from GMA Network and the satellite service's corporate siblings 5 and Cignal Entertainment.
  - One Sports resumed its operation of regular programming.
- June 19 - 5 celebrated its 60th anniversary of broadcasting.
- June 22 - After a year of being off-air, ZOE Broadcasting Network reactivated its VHF channel 11 while at the same time opened its assigned DTT channel 20. Since then, both were under test broadcast but still open for blocktime or channel lease offers.
- June 24 - Tencent acquired Malaysian streaming service, iflix.
- June 26 - GMA Network formally launched its digital terrestrial television brand, GMA Affordabox.
- June 27
  - ABS-CBN's Kapamilya Tickets (KTX) extended its service from the online ticketing portal of ABS-CBN live shows to a digital portal including virtual venue and streaming platform (dubbed as Key To Experiences) that can host simultaneous events, such as from concerts and movie premieres to trade shows, for promising an exclusive experience for organizers and participants.
  - CLTV 36 (owned by Radioworld Broadcasting Corporation) has switched its airing of aspect ratio format quality on the channel feed and its programming to widescreen format (16:9) as being converted its mitigation of reception through analog (and later digital signal in 2023) reception through free TV and other cable and satellite providers after 13 years and 3 months on the usage of broadcast video picture resolution that migrated from fullscreen format (4:3).
- June 29 - As part of its 70th anniversary festivities, GMA Network formally launched its brand new Asianovela channel on digital terrestrial television, Heart of Asia.
- June 30 - Most of ABS-CBN's digital broadcasting operations from ABS-CBN Convergence using the digital terrestrial television provider ABS-CBN TV Plus, alongside a blocktime agreement with AMCARA Broadcasting Network including its use of digital frequency on Channel 43 carrying Asianovela Channel, Yey!, Kapamilya Box Office, and the free-to-air operations of Jeepney TV, Cine Mo! and TeleRadyo airing in Metro Manila and nearby provinces, as well as the operations of Sky Cable Corporation on its usage of their direct to home satellite service Sky Direct signed off the air at 8:30 p.m. due to the alias cease-and-desist order of the National Telecommunications Commission to temporary stop the broadcast operations of ABS-CBN TV Plus and Sky Direct because of the expiration of its franchise granted on March 30, 1995. Meanwhile, ABS-CBN News Channel, Kapamilya Channel, Cine Mo!, TeleRadyo, O Shopping, Knowledge Channel and Creative Programs owned pay TV channels (Cinema One, Liga, Metro Channel, Myx and Jeepney TV) remain unaffected on Sky Cable and some direct-to-home providers in nearby areas. While in ABS-CBN TV Plus, the digital broadcast of other networks also remain unaffected and the operations continue outside Metro Manila.

=== July ===
- July 1 - A day after the two alias cease-and-desist order of the National Telecommunications Commission to temporary stop the broadcast operations of ABS-CBN TV Plus and Sky Direct, ABS-CBN announced that Asianovela Channel, Yey!, Kapamilya Box Office, and the free-to-air operations of Jeepney TV, Cine Mo! and TeleRadyo airing on ABS-CBN TV Plus outside Metro Manila were temporary stopped its digital broadcasting and signed off the air at 6:00 p.m. Meanwhile, Cine Mo!, TeleRadyo and Jeepney TV remain unaffected on Sky Cable and some direct-to-home providers in nearby areas. While in ABS-CBN TV Plus, the digital broadcast of other networks also remain unaffected and the operations still continue.
- July 7
  - After 8 years and 4 months of broadcasting, Fox Filipino has ceased its broadcast by Fox Networks Group (a subsidiary of Disney International Operations owend by The Walt Disney Company) due to programming redundancies, lack of advertising support and cross-cutting measures. Meanwhile, GMA Network (the network's content partner since its 2012 launch) said that they encouraged the viewers to continue to watch the older shows of the network that was previously aired on Fox Filipino on the network's partner streaming services such as iflix and Amazon Prime Video under the GMA On Demand banner, the network's new digital network Heart of Asia, as well as the new cable and satellite network One Screen.
  - CNN Philippines temporary shut down its broadcast again and limit its broadcast of select programs through online to allow the disinfection of its studios in Corporate World Center in Mandaluyong, where one of its network staff tested positive with the virus.
- July 10 - After 12 hearings which began on May 26, the House of Representatives, particularly on the Committee on Legislative Franchises, unofficially voted 70–11–2–1 (rejected–favored–rescued–abstained) to deny the franchise application of ABS-CBN at 3:09 p.m. Following that, ABS-CBN Corporation (which is a media conglomerate or mainstream media) announced that would instead focus on limited businesses that does not require a legislative franchise including digital channels, cable, international licensing and distribution, and production of content for various streaming services. It would keep TV5 and GMA are the remaining free-to-air television networks in the country.
- July 12 - Kabayan celebrated its 10th anniversary on Philippine television.
- July 13 - ABS-CBN's subsidiary Creative Programs, Inc., launched For Your Entertainment (FYE) Channel, exclusively on a Filipino-made social networking service, Kumu.
- July 19 - People's Television Network announced a one-day halt of broadcast running for 24 hours to give way for the disinfection of its main studios and offices in Visayas Avene, Quezon City, following a network employee has been tested positive with the virus.
- July 27 - Cignal TV and its sister company, Smart Communications announced a multi-year deal with the National Basketball Association for the league's official broadcast rights in the Philippines, replacing Solar Entertainment Corporation. The games during the 2019–20 season would aired on free-to-air networks 5 and One Sports (replacing CNN Philippines as a temporary exclusive free-to-air broadcaster, which eventually dropped in March because of the COVID-19 pandemic in the United States and in Canada, as well as the 4-month suspension of the league's games). Meanwhile, Smart postpaid and prepaid subscribers can avail the live streaming through its service platform. The deal was started on the same day the NBA's restart of the current season began. This marked the first time the NBA broadcast on 5 since the then-ABC 5 last aired the NBA games (in partnership with Solar) from 2007 to 2008.
- July 31 - In coinciding with the NBA's restart of the current season, Cignal TV launched a brand new 24/7 basketball channel on satellite television, NBA TV Philippines (which is the Philippine version of an American channel of the same name), replacing NBA Premium TV (which was formerly owned by the NBA's former Philippine broadcaster, Solar Entertainment Corporation) after ten months of absence thus exclusively available on the satellite provider, though Cignal plans to offer the channel for syndication to other cable operators.

=== August ===
- August 1
  - ABS-CBN Corporation launched a livestreaming exclusive and recapping episodes for old, new and well-loved shows of ABS-CBN on their digital and online platforms such as Facebook and YouTube, Kapamilya Online Live.
  - People's Television Network announced that its news programming including their hourly updates remained in light of the network's reduced manpower policies beginning August 3 up to September 6 (formerly on August 10), which affect all programming schedules resulting in a reduction of live programming hours. As a result, PTV News and the certain editions of PTV Balita Ngayon converted to remote production. The planned return of the Philippine Lotto Draw broadcast starting August 7 (formerly on August 4) would go on as planned in phrases.
- August 2
  - In response to a live webinar demanding a return to ECQ restrictions by the representatives of the country's medical profession a day before, Kapamilya Channel reshuffled its Sunday programming with its movie block expanding into two films, pushing ASAP Natin 'To to move its timeslot on 12:30 p.m.
  - As part of the celebrations on its 70th anniversary, GMA Network launched a new online service, GMA Entertainment Shows (GETS) Online, which can accessed and binge-watch of both the network's past archive and current programs as well as digital-only contents on their internet platforms.
  - Imbestigador celebrated its 20th anniversary on Philippine television.
- August 11
  - The Department of Education launched DepEd TV, an educational programming service block featuring lessons for students under the basic level of formal education system on TV and radio as part of their distance learning while face–to–face learning was prohibited due to COVID-19 pandemic. It started the test broadcast run of the programs via IBC and digital-only Channel 30 until August 21 except weekends. DepEd also plans to broadcast using three television stations each for elementary, junior high school, and both senior high school and Alternative Learning System. During its first run, DepEd TV was criticized for the incorrect grammar in Grade 8 English subject. But on August 14, the agency announced the postponement on the opening of regular classes in public schools to October 5, thus placing its test run ended on the same day. On September 21–25, DepEd TV conducted a final test broadcast via broadcast networks (IBC and other partnered channels), direct-to-home satellite providers (Cignal and G Sat), and various cable providers (particularly the members of the Philippine Cable Television Association).
  - Solar Learning was launched as the all-day free-to-air digital terrestrial channel specialized for the online social learning and education classes owned by Solar Entertainment Corporation in partnership with the Department of Education.
- August 12 - Following the successful launch of Kapamilya Online Live, ABS-CBN's Star Music relaunched a digital online channel for children's learning by using music exclusively on their digital and online platforms including Facebook, Spotify and YouTube, TuTuBee (formerly called Star Music Kids).
- August 14
  - ABS-CBN's Knowledge Channel launched "School at Home: Ang Saya Matuto ng Bago", a campaign program aligned with the Most Essential Learning Competencies in the DepEd's Basic Education Learning Continuity Plan which targeted students to learn at home during the COVID-19 pandemic.
  - Vice Ganda launched its own digital network powered by Viva Digital, The Vice Ganda Network. It was originally launched on July 24, but due to the technical issues of the said network, it was postponed and moved to its current date.
- August 15 - MediaQuest Holdings, through TV5 Network, Inc. announced The 5 Network or simply 5 would reverted to its former name, TV5, with brand new entertainment programs in collaboration with its sister company, Cignal TV (under Cignal Entertainment), through blocktime agreements co-produced with other content providers such as Archangel Media, Inc., Brightlight Productions, The IdeaFirst Company, Regal Entertainment and Viva Television, among others. Originally, the plan was to rebranding it into One TV on April 13 (first) and July 20 (second) respectively, but because of the community quarantines in the Philippines amid the COVID-19 pandemic, it was silently decided to not carry on with its promotions through its digital and online platforms have been removed. There's no official word yet from the company if the rebrand will continue or not in the near future whereas some reports have said that TV5 has cancelled its plans to rebrand.
- August 16 - Heart Salvador (coached by Bamboo Mañalac), Cydel Gabutero (coached by Lea Salonga), Isang Manlapaz (coached by apl.de.ap) and Kendra Aguirre (coached by Sarah Geronimo), all won the second season of The Voice Teens for the first time in The Voice of the Philippines history.
- August 19 - Prima Donnas celebrated its first anniversary on television.
- August 21 - Pinoy Big Brother celebrated its 15th anniversary on Philippine television.
- August 25 - News5 announced that all of their radio and television programming was being converted to remote production as a result of a massive disinfection of the TV5 Media Center following a network employee testing positive for the virus. This followed a prior shutdown of news operations on TV5, One PH and One News from August 21 to 23, which had also been announced.
- August 27 - Following the acquisition of iflix on June 24, Tencent announced the collaboration of the said service with its own streaming service (Tencent Video or WeTV) under the unified referral as "WeTV iflix". However, both platforms were still operating autonomously with their own shared strategies.
- August 28 - After almost 32 years, ABS-CBN Regional ceased its operations with 12 TV Patrol–themed newscasts, 10 news bulletins and 10 morning shows ended their broadcast following the denial of its legislative franchise on July 10.
- August 30 - YouTube launched "Super Stream" in the Philippines, featuring limited free access to quality binge-watch local TV, movie and sports content in collaboration with media partners.
- August 31 - ABS-CBN Corporation announced on July 15 that it ceased the operations of some of its businesses and implemented a retrenchment program covering the company and its subsidiaries, following the non-renewal of its congressional franchise on July 10.

=== September ===
- September 1
  - ABS-CBN's streaming media services iWant and TFC Online were merged into one over-the-top content platform, iWantTFC, and began its soft launched on the same date exclusively on the web browser and mobile application, as well as be accessible in the Philippines and worldwide. In addition, Sky On Demand was also merged with iWantTFC and The Filipino Channel (TFC) would also available on US-based service, Xfinity in HD.
  - TeleRadyo Cebu (formerly DYAB TeleRadyo) rebranded to Sibya TV, serving as Cebu's dedicated news and information TV channel, thus became the fourth Cebuano-language news channel and fifth overall to broadcast on the same language.
- September 9 - GMA Network implemented a layoff program covering GMA News TV due to COVID-19 pandemic. In addition to this, it was reported that GMA also announced the cancellation of productions on some programs airing on the said news channel with eleven shows were reportedly threatened to disappear off the air.
- September 10 - National Telecommunications Commission issued an order to recall all radio frequencies and channels assigned to ABS-CBN Corporation following the lack of congressional franchise.
- September 11–12
  - September 11 - Following the successful launch of Kapamilya Online Live, and the relaunches of KTX and TuTuBee, ABS-CBN Corporation extended its digital and online presence to the virtual world by launching an edutainment interactive portal hub with featured some programming contents for kids exclusively on their social networking and website platforms, Just Love Kids.
  - September 12 - The following day, ABS-CBN also launched a weekend morning programming block of the same name featuring with the same program contents for children exclusively on Kapamilya Channel.
- September 20
  - GMA Network, in partnership with Jungo TV, formally launched its brand new Asian pop culture channel through K-pop, lifestyle and entertainment programming contents on digital terrestrial television, Hallypop (which is the Philippine version of a global TV network of the same name).
  - INC TV celebrated its 20th anniversary of broadcasting.
- September 21 - GMA News TV resumed its regular schedule slots with returning and new programming line-ups.
- September 22
  - In acted on a 2013 illegal dismissal case, Supreme Court has ordered GMA Network to reinstate 30 cameramen and assistant cameramen and pay their back wages, allowances and other benefits from its illegal dismissal in 2013 up to actual reinstatement.
  - POPTV made its official launched after being for soft operations in 2019.
- September 24 - Eugenio Lopez III tendered his resignation as Chairman Emeritus and Director of ABS-CBN Corporation and other Lopez-owned companies for personal reasons.
- September 28 - FPJ's Ang Probinsyano celebrated its 5th anniversary on Philippine television.

=== October ===
- October 2 - Saksi, GMA Network's longest running late-night newscast since 2002 and formerly as an early evening newscast during its first years, celebrated its 25th anniversary on Philippine television.
- October 5
  - After many years of being a Sky Cable only channels, three ABS-CBN-owned cable channels: Cine Mo!, Jeepney TV and Metro Channel, were broadcast on G Sat.
  - DepEd TV, an educational programming service block, expanded into a television network as the service was broadcast on other partnered providers including Cignal and SatLite.
- October 6 - ABS-CBN Corporation and Jesus Is Lord Church Worldwide (ZOE Broadcasting Network) entered a deal to air ABS-CBN shows via Channel 11 (ZOE's owned TV frequency) in Mega Manila beginning on October 10. The following day, ABS-CBN also released another statement for the list of some programs that would include on Channel 11's line-up, respectively.
- October 8 - O Shopping made some changes on its channel space assignment from Channel 11 to Channel 25 (Metro Manila) and Channel 21 (Provincial) on Sky Cable, as ZOE's upcoming channel was assigned to Channel 11 beginning on the same day.
- October 9–11 - Due to the success of the Easter Triduum broadcast of the 190th General Conference of the Church of Jesus Christ of Latter-Day Saints, The Church of Jesus Christ of Latter-day Saints in the Philippines and GMA Network, through GMA News TV, broadcast the Church's 190th Semiannual General Conference via satellite delay on GMA News TV though both free-to-air (analog and digital) and cable TV (including Music and the Spoken Word, which aired on October 10). The broadcast, which aired remotely from Salt Lake City due to the COVID-19 pandemic that forced the first General Conference TV broadcast in the country earlier that year, marked the first time the Semiannual General Conference was broadcast on Philippine television.
- October 10 - ZOE TV rebranded to A2Z, which featured some programs from its several content providers (ABS-CBN and Knowledge Channel), licensors (CBN Asia, Trinity Broadcasting Network and others), and ZOE's owned Light TV on the said network, after ABS-CBN and ZOE agreed with the entering of the said deal on October 6. This also marked the return of ABS-CBN programming on free TV after the cease-and-desist order by National Telecommunications Commission due to expired legislative franchise on May 5 and the denial of its renewed legislative franchise on July 10.
- October 20 - Bubble Gang celebrated its 25th anniversary on Philippine television.
- October 23 - MediaQuest Holdings, through Cignal TV and TV5 Network, Inc. with its sister company Smart Communications, announced a 5 1/2-year deal with the University Athletic Association of the Philippines to aired the games beginning with the 84th season after the cancellation of 83rd season on both free-to-air networks TV5 and One Sports, and on the cable and satellite channel, UAAP Varsity Channel that formally launched on September 8, 2021, which supposed to schedule its first airing in 2021, but it was moved on March 26, 2022, due to the health safety of student-athletes amid the COVID-19 pandemic in the Philippines. Meanwhile, Smart postpaid and prepaid subscribers can avail the live streaming through its service platform. This is the first time that the Philippine collegiate league games broadcast on TV5 since NCAA Philippines in 2013-15 and also marked the end of its 20-year relationship with ABS-CBN Corporation following the non-renewal of its congressional franchise on July 10 and the dissolution of ABS-CBN Sports division to close its business operations on August 31.
- October 30 - After 2 years and 9 months of broadcasting, Liga has ceased its broadcast on pay TV by Creative Programs, Inc. (a subsidiary of ABS-CBN Corporation) due to the non-renewal of its congressional franchise on July 10 and the dissolution of ABS-CBN Sports division to close its business operations on August 31.

=== November ===
- November 1
  - After 7 years of broadcasting, O Shopping has ceased its operations as a pay TV channel and infomercial program by ACJ O Shopping Corporation (a joint venture between ABS-CBN Corporation and CJ ENM O Shopping Division) due to the implementation of a retrenchment program covering its business company from August 7, following the non-renewal of its congressional franchise on July 10 and CJ Group's decision to close its business operations in Southeast Asia effective December 31 amid the COVID-19 pandemic.
  - Cine Mo! has officially part of both Cignal and SatLite channel lineups of Cignal TV, following its successful launch of G Sat's channel lineup a month before.
- November 2 - TAP W rebranded to TAP TV as a general entertainment channel.
- November 4 - TAP TV broadcast its first news coverage of the 2020 United States presidential election, straight from the United States through NBC News.
- November 11 - Balitanghali, one of the nine surviving shows of GMA News TV since its 2011 launch and one of the last three shows inherited from its predecessor network Q, celebrated its 15th anniversary on Philippine television.
- November 12 - The National Telecommunications Commission approved the digital broadcast of A2Z on UHF Channel 20 and became available on most digital boxes, including ABS-CBN TV Plus and GMA Affordabox across Mega Manila.
- November 13
  - iWantTFC officially made its grand launched after two months and 13 days of being in soft launch and the merging of iWant and TFC Online on September 1. The platform was made the strategy in three different tiers that has used similar to the US-based streaming service, Peacock: the free tier, the premium tier (which was available for paid subscribers and through subscribing it from telco companies) and an ad-free option with the movie rental service included for an additional cost.
  - Ang Pinaka, one of the nine surviving shows of GMA News TV since its 2011 launch and one of the last three shows inherited from its predecessor network Q, celebrated its 15th anniversary on Philippine television.
- November 15 - TAP Edge reformatted as a drama-centric entertainment channel, ending its action sports programming via EDGEsport in December 2020.
- November 20
  - Myx celebrated its 20th anniversary of broadcasting originated as a programming block of Studio 23.
  - GMA Network announced a 5-year deal with the National Collegiate Athletic Association to cover the games of the NCAA from seasons 96 to 101. The new broadcast deal outbided TV5 (the league's former broadcaster in seasons 89 and 90) with the revenues on GMA's new deal would be donated in support of the financial aid for the students of the league's participating colleges and it would broadcast on GMA News TV and on the network's official website. It also marked the return of sporting events for the network for the first time since 2018 and for the sister network after the cancelation of News TV All Sports in 2016, thus ending its second stint with ABS-CBN Corporation (which began on the 91st season) following the non-renewal of its congressional franchise on July 10 and the dissolution of ABS-CBN Sports division to close its business operations on August 31.
- November 26 - For the first time, TAP TV became the exclusive Philippine broadcaster for the premiere live aired on cable and satellite television broadcast of Macy's Thanksgiving Day Parade via NBC from Macy's flagship store in New York City, USA since 2013 with the last year's parade was broadcast via tape delay on CNN Philippines.

=== December ===
- December 1 - Kapwa Ko Mahal Ko celebrated its 45th anniversary on Philippine television.
- December 8 - GMA Network, Inc. launched "Synergy: A GMA Collaboration", a company's division composed of a group that catered and produced ticketing and non-ticketing events and activities.
- December 15 - Viva Entertainment launched an over-the-top content platform, VivaMax, and began its soft operations which include movies and TV series content from the Viva library, as well as dubbed versions of Hollywood and Korean movies, in addition to its exclusive-owned web series and miniseries.
- December 20 - Jessica Villarubin of Cebu won the third season of The Clash.
- December 21 - Philippine Collective Media Corporation, a Tacloban-based broadcast media company owned by Leyte 1st District Representative and House Majority Floor Leader Martin Romualdez, granted an amendment of its congressional franchise under Republic Act No. 11508 (which previously Republic Act No. 9773, where originally limited to Eastern Visayas only), allowing PCMC to operate radio and television stations nationwide. The company operated a local independent station PRTV in Tacloban.
- December 26 - Singer-songwriter Daryl Ong (portrayed as "2-2-B") was proclaimed the grand winner of the first season of Masked Singer Pilipinas.
- December 31 - DZIQ and its television counterpart Inquirer 990 Television has ceased its broadcasting operations by the Inquirer Group of Companies due to programming redundancies, lack of advertising support and cost-cutting measures as well as change in business directions during the COVID-19 pandemic in the Philippines.

=== Unknown dates ===
- September - Regional News Group was formed as a new independent cooperative multicasting media group made by the several retrenched employees, news anchors and reporters of the now-defunct ABS-CBN Regional and it composed of different versions nationwide including RNG Luzon (based in Baguio), RNG Bicol (based in Legazpi and Naga) and RNG Mindanao (based in Davao and Cagayan de Oro).

== Debuts ==
=== Major networks ===
==== ABS-CBN ====
The following are programs that debuted on ABS-CBN:

- January 6: Flower Crew: Dating Agency
- January 20: A Soldier's Heart
- January 27: Story of Yanxi Palace
- February 8: The Voice Teens season 2
- February 10: Love Thy Woman
- February 23: 24/7
- March 2: The Tale of Nokdu
- March 9: Love in Sadness
- March 16: iWant Original Series and Kapamilya Daily Mass
- March 18: Garantisadong Balita, Kabayan and Radyo Patrol Balita Alas-Siyete (live hookup via DZMM TeleRadyo)
- April 2: Early Edition (live hookup via ANC)

===== Re-runs =====
- January 5: MathDali
- March 16: May Bukas Pa (2009), On the Wings of Love and 100 Days to Heaven
- March 21: Your Face Sounds Familiar Kids season 1
- March 23: Got to Believe, The Legal Wife, Walang Hanggan (2012) and Wildflower
- March 28: Bayani, Hiraya Manawari and Sine'skwela
- March 29: Pilipinas Got Talent season 6
- April 13: Tubig at Langis

==== A2Z ====
The following are programs that debuted on A2Z:

- October 10: Bro. Eddie Villanueva Classics, It's Showtime and Zinema sa Umaga (A2Z Zinema)
- October 11: ASAP Natin 'To
- October 12: Ang sa Iyo ay Akin, FPJ's Ang Probinsyano, Primetime Zinema (A2Z Zinema), Walang Hanggang Paalam and Zinema Presents (A2Z Zinema)
- October 14: Wikaharian (School at Home)
- October 17: Jesus the Healer, Zine Aksyon (A2Z Zinema) and Zine Love (A2Z Zinema)
- October 18: FPJ: Da King (A2Z Zinema) and JIL Live Worship and Healing Service
- October 19: Magandang Buhay
- October 24: I Can See Your Voice season 3, Maalaala Mo Kaya and Paano Kita Mapasasalamatan?
- October 25: Iba 'Yan! and Sunday Zine Hits (A2Z Zinema)
- October 26: Bagong Umaga
- November 1: A2Z News Alert
- November 9: Teacher Celine (School at Home)
- November 14: Asenso Pinoy
- December 6: Pinoy Big Brother: Connect

===== Re-runs =====
- October 10: ATBP: Awit, Titik at Bilang na Pambata (School at Home)^{1}^{7}, Bayani (School at Home)^{1}^{5}^{8}, Matanglawin (School at Home)^{1}^{8} and Team Yey! (Kidz Weekend)^{3}
- October 12: Alikabuk (School at Home)^{7}^{8}, Cedie, Ang Munting Prinsipe (Kidz Toon Time)^{1}^{3}, Epol/Apple (School at Home)^{1}^{6}^{8}, Math-Tinik (School at Home)^{1}^{8}, Pamana (School at Home)^{8}, Princess Sarah (Kidz Toon Time)^{1}^{3}, Sine'skwela (School at Home)^{1}^{6}^{8}, Solved (School at Home)^{7}^{8}, Superbook Reimagined (Kidz Toon Time)^{1}^{3} and The Flying House (Kidz Toon Time)^{1}^{2}^{3}
- October 13: Hiraya Manawari (School at Home)^{1}^{8}
- October 14: Karen's World (School at Home)^{7}^{8}, Kasaysayan TV (School at Home)^{7} and Salam (School at Home)^{1}^{8}
- October 15: MathDali (School at Home)^{1}^{6}^{8}
- October 16: Gab to Go (School at Home)^{8}
- October 26: The Good Son^{1}^{4}^{6} and Wow! (School at Home)^{8}
- November 9: Why? (School at Home)^{7}^{8}
- November 10: K-High (School at Home)^{8}
- November 12: Estudyantipid (School at Home)^{8}
- November 19: Agos (School at Home)^{8}
- December 1: Pahina (School at Home)^{1}^{8}
- December 4: Carlo's Blog (School at Home)^{8} and Puno ng Buhay (School at Home)^{8}
- December 10: The Adventures of Tom Sawyer (Kidz Toon Time)^{1}^{3}^{5}
- December 14: Dog of Flanders (Kidz Toon Time)^{1}^{3}^{5}
- December 17: Tipong Pinoy (School at Home)^{2}

Notes

- ^{a} Originally aired on ABS-CBN
- ^{b} Originally aired on GMA
- ^{c} Originally aired on Yey!
- ^{d} Originally aired on Jeepney TV
- ^{e} Originally aired on Q (now GMA News TV)
- ^{f} Originally aired on Kapamilya Channel
- ^{g} Originally aired on NBN (now PTV)
- ^{h} Originally aired on Knowledge Channel

==== GMA ====
The following are programs that debuted on GMA Network:

- January 5: All-Out Sundays
- January 6: Dragon Ball Super (season 1)
- January 27: Anak ni Waray vs. Anak ni Biday and Angel's Last Mission
- February 1: Prima Donnas (Saturday edition)
- February 3: Love of My Life
- February 10: Descendants of the Sun (Philippine adaptation)
- February 15: Wowowin Primetime
- February 16: Centerstage
- February 22: Ilaban Natin 'Yan!
- February 24: Bilangin ang Bituin sa Langit
- March 7: Justice League: War
- March 9: The Last Empress
- March 19: Melo del Prado sa Super Radyo DZBB (live hookup from DZBB-AM)
- March 21: GMA Regional TV Weekend News
- March 22: Sambuhay TV Mass
- March 23: Saksi sa Dobol B and Super Balita sa Umaga Nationwide (live hookup from DZBB-AM and GMA News TV)
- April 17: Biyahe ni Drew
- April 18: 24 Oras News Alert
- April 20: GMA Regional TV Live! (GMA Cebu)
- June 1: At Home with GMA Regional TV (GMA Davao, GMA General Santos and GMA Cagayan de Oro)
- June 6: Piggy Tales: Third Act
- June 29: Misty and One Western Visayas (GMA Cebu)
- July 12: Taste Buddies
- July 13: One Piece season 11
- August 10: Madam Pushy and I
- August 16: Idol sa Kusina
- August 31: GMA Regional TV Early Edition (GMA Iloilo and GMA Bacolod)
- September 5: Angry Birds Blues
- September 6: Home Base Plus (season 21)
- September 7: My Love from Another Star
- September 15: Makulay ang Buhay (season 1)
- September 27: Lockdown: Food Diaries
- September 28: I Can See You (season 1) and Mornings with GMA Regional TV (GMA Dagupan and GMA Ilocos)
- October 3: The Clash (season 3)
- October 10: Pepito Manaloto: Kuwento Kuwento
- October 12: The Shannara Chronicles (season 2)
- November 8: TriPinas
- November 23: Christmas Cartoon Festival Presents
- November 28: Turbo Zone
- November 30: VIP
- December 5: Kaibigan: The Series
- December 6: Pororo: The Racing Adventure
- December 26: Pinas Sarap

===== Re-runs =====
- January 20: The Crown Princess
- February 1: One Piece Film: Z
- February 23: Knockout: New Challenger
- March 16: Jackie Chan Adventures^{1}^{3}
- March 18: Ika-6 na Utos and Kambal, Karibal
- March 19: Encantadia (2016)
- March 23: My Husband's Lover
- March 30: Alyas Robin Hood (season 1) and Onanay
- April 1: My Golden Life
- April 4: Yo-Kai Watch: The Movie
- April 5: Knockout: Rising
- April 6: Meant to Be
- April 18: Mako Mermaids (season 2) and Pokémon the Series: XYZ
- May 2: Celebrity Bluff
- May 4: Kalyeserye (Eat Bulaga!) and Strong Girl Bong-soon
- May 9: Fairy Tail season 6 and Karelasyon
- May 16: Invincible Teacher season 2
- May 18: Art Angel and Stairway to Heaven (2009)
- June 13: Road Trip (3rd incarnation)
- June 15: Secret Garden
- June 20: Flame of Recca
- August 10: One True Love
- August 23: GMA Telesine Presents
- August 31: Alamat
- September 27: Wagas^{2}
- October 5: Temptation of Wife (2012)
- October 26: Dragon Ball Super (season 1)
- November 14: Hunter × Hunter (2011)
- November 23: My Korean Jagiya
- December 21: Wolfblood (season 2)

Notes
^ ^{a} Originally aired on ABS-CBN
^ ^{b} Originally aired on GMA News TV
^ ^{c} Originally aired on Jack TV (now defunct)

==== TV5 ====
The following are programs that debuted on TV5:

- January 5: Fight Fest Presents
- January 6: Tangled: The Series
- January 12: WWE Raw
- January 26: BBC My World
- March 17: One News Now (live hookup via One News)
- March 21: ONE Championship
- March 22: CCF Afternoon Worship Service and Misa sa Veritas
- March 30: CCF Daily and Manila Cathedral Daily Mass
- April 10: The Key of David
- April 19: Knightfall (season 1)
- April 25: Tomorrow's World
- May 4: Doc McStuffins: Toy Hospital
- June 8: Idol in Action
- June 21: Sportspage
- June 25: The Huddle
- June 27: God Code
- July 1: In Touch with Dr. Charles Stanley
- July 20: Betty sa NY, Furious Fire, Gotham season 1, DC's Legends of Tomorrow season 1, Lifetime Original Movies and Tierra de reyes
- July 21: TVflix
- July 22: Action Spectacular
- July 23: 44 Cats, Regal Academy and Sine Asya
- July 24: Fan Faves
- July 25: Ancient Aliens
- July 26: Dance Moms and One Screen Presents
- August 10: MX3 Infomercials
- August 11: DC's Legends of Tomorrow season 2
- August 15: Bangon Talentadong Pinoy (season 1), Bawal na Game Show, Fill in the Bank and Usapang Real Life
- August 16: Fit for Life
- August 17: Chika, Besh! and Courage the Cowardly Dog
- August 29: PBA 3-Point Shootout Virtual Charity Tournament
- September 3: Gotham season 2
- September 12: Breaking the Magician's Code
- September 21: Reply 1988 and Wok of Love
- October 4: NBA Hype
- October 5: Frontline Pilipinas, News5 Alerts, Radyo5 Network News and Ted Failon at DJ Chacha sa Radyo5
- October 12: Angel Heart
- October 18: I Got You, NBA Spotlight, Sunday 'Kada (season 1) and Sunday Noontime Live!
- October 19: Lunch Out Loud
- October 24: Masked Singer Pilipinas season 1, Oh My Dad! and Rated Korina
- October 25: Onstage
- October 31: Ghost Adventures (season 2)
- November 23: Ate ng Ate Ko and Paano ang Pasko?
- November 24: Stay-In Love
- November 25: Bella Bandida
- November 26: Carpool
- November 27: Kagat ng Dilim (2020)
- December 13: Pawn Stars
- December 20: From Helen's Kitchen (season 3)

===== Unknown dates =====
- November: Frontline Eastern Visayas (TV5 Leyte)

===== Re-runs =====
- January 4: Untold Stories Mula sa Face to Face
- January 6: The Avengers: Earth's Mightiest Heroes^{1}
- January 13: Obsession and The Best of Face to Face
- January 18: Kaya and One of the Boys
- January 27: Felina: Prinsesa ng mga Pusa, Isang Dakot Na Luha, Misibis Bay, Pinoy Explorer and Undercover
- March 2: Babaeng Hampaslupa, Gellicious, My Driver Sweet Lover, Sa Ngalan ng Ina and Ultimate Spider-Man
- March 3: Positive
- March 5: Mga Nagbabagang Bulaklak
- March 7: Celebrity Samurai, Jasmine, Kano Luvs Pinay, Mac and Chiz, Midnight DJ, No Harm, No Foul and Wattpad Presents
- March 22: Avengers Assemble^{3}
- April 13: Cassandra: Warrior Angel, Enchanted Garden, Isang Dakot na Luha, Kidlat, Misibis Bay and Valiente (2012)
- April 14: Ang Utol Kong Hoodlum
- April 16: Kapitan Awesome
- May 4: Jake and the Never Land Pirates and Randy Cunningham: 9th Grade Ninja
- May 7: History with Lorud
- May 9: Ha-pi House^{4}, Star Confessions, The Mysterious Case of Bea Montenegro^{4}, The Wives of House No. 2^{4} and TV5 Love Stories
- May 10: Ang Kwarto Sa May Hagdanan^{4}, From Helen's Kitchen^{8}, Hour Glass^{4}, The Kasambahays^{4} and Taddy Taddy Po^{4}
- May 16: Barrio Kulimlim^{3}
- May 18: Ang Panday (2016), Bakit Manipis ang Ulap?, Batibot, Hi-5 Philippines, and LolaBasyang.com
- May 25: Mickey and the Roadster Racers
- June 8: Glamorosa, Kick Buttowski: Suburban Daredevil, Lokomoko (Happy Naman D'yan!), Lokomoko U (Happy Naman D'yan!), Madam Chairman, Tropa Mo Ko Unli (Happy Naman D'yan!) and Wow Mali Pa Rin! (Happy Naman D'yan!)
- June 13: One of the Boys
- June 22: Motorcity
- June 29: Pidol's Wonderland
- July 2: Istorifik: Pidol Kuwentong Fantastik
- July 20: Codename: Kids Next Door^{7}, Dexter's Laboratory^{5}, Ed, Edd n Eddy, Marimar (1994)^{2}^{6}^{7}, The Legal Mistress^{4} and The Powerpuff Girls^{2}
- July 21: Diary of a 30-Something^{4}
- July 22: Will You Marry Me?^{4}
- July 23: Winx Club^{1}
- July 24: From The Beautiful Country^{4}
- July 25: Feels Like Forever, Kalye Wars, Operation Break Casanova's Heart and Tabi Po^{4}
- July 26: Blue Jeans and The Orbiters^{4}
- September 17: Brush^{4}
- December 6: Riverdale season 1^{9}

Notes
^ ^{a} Originally aired on ABS-CBN
^ ^{b} Originally aired on GMA
^ ^{c} Originally aired on S+A
^ ^{d} Originally aired on Sari-Sari Channel
^ ^{e} Originally aired on Studio 23
^ ^{f} Originally aired on Q (now GMA News TV)
^ ^{g} Originally aired on RPN (now CNN Philippines)
^ ^{h} Originally aired on Colours
^ ^{i} Originally aired on One Screen

=== State-owned networks ===
==== PTV ====
The following are programs that debuted on People's Television Network:

- March 16: Public Briefing: #LagingHandaPH
- April 20: Tutok Tulfo 2.0 (hook-up via Radyo Pilipinas 1 738 AM)
- May 1: Counterpoint with Secretary Salvador Panelo (2nd incarnation)
- July 27: PTV Balita Ngayon
- August 3: Network Briefing News
- September 7: PTV News Tonight, Rise and Shine Pilipinas and Ulat Bayan (weekday edition)
- September 12: Ulat Bayan Weekend
- October 5: Tutok PDEA, Kontra Droga (hook-up via Radyo Pilipinas 1 738 AM)
- October 11: Word of God Network
- November 21: Barangay 4

==== IBC ====
The following are programs that debuted on IBC:

- January 5: Feast TV and Misa Tradionalis Latin Mass and Catechism
- March 23: Public Briefing: #LagingHandaPH and Sentro Balita (simulcast via People's Television Network)
- May 1: PTV News (simulcast via People's Television Network)
- August 2: FYI
- August 11: DepEd TV

=== Minor networks ===
The following are programs that debuted on minor networks:

- January 5: Himig ng Lahi on Net 25
- February 6: The Medyo Late Night Show with Jojo A. on RJ DigiTV
- April 3: Word for the Season on Light TV
- April 6: I-Proclaim on Light TV
- April 6: Serbisyong Bayanihan on UNTV
- May 2: ARTime on Net 25
- May 9: Tagisan ng Galing on Net 25
- May 16: Talking Heads on BEAM TV
- May 25: Hataw Balita Pilipinas on UNTV
- June 1: Bro. Eddie Villanueva Classics on Light TV
- June 6: Ito Ang Balita Weekend Edition on UNTV
- June 21: Kids Church on Light TV
- July 13: UNTV News Worldwide on UNTV
- July 26: Unlad: Kaagapay sa Hanapbuhay on Net 25
- August 9: Pelikwentuhan on Net 25
- August 23: City Sanctuary Worship Celebration and J12 Kids on Light TV
- September 14: Happy Time on Net 25
- September 27: Kesayasaya on Net 25
- October 24: Awana at Home on Light TV
- November 7: Count Your Blessings on Light TV
- November 28: Ang Daigdig Ko'y Ikaw on Net 25
- December 5: Healing Galing Live! on UNTV

==== Unknown dates ====
- Ani at Kita sa TV, Chinatown TV and DepEd TV on BEAM TV

=== Other channels ===
The following are programs that debuted on other channels:

- January 6: Along Came Love, Anything But Plain and Shadows of the Past on Telenovela Channel
- January 12: Sierra Canyon High School Basketball on 5 Plus (now One Sports)
- January 12: Jamie & Jimmy's Food Fight Club (season 4) on ETC
- January 12: Penn & Teller: Fool Us (season 5) on Jack TV (now defunct)
- January 16: My Hotter Half on ETC
- January 20: Hit the Top on GMA News TV
- January 21: WWE SmackDown on 5 Plus (now One Sports)
- January 25: The Legend of Paranormal Stories on GMA News TV
- January 26: BBC My World on One News
- January 27: BFF: Beauty, Fun & Fashion (2nd incarnation), DZRH Showbiz Spotted, MBC Network News and Pasikatin Na Yan on DZRH News Television
- January 27: Guest Star on ETC
- February 2: Taste MNL on GMA News TV
- February 8: 30 for 30 on 5 Plus (now One Sports)
- February 10: Alvin and the Chipmunks (2015) on Yey!
- February 14: Labor of Love on DZMM TeleRadyo
- February 15: Usapang Kalye on DZMM TeleRadyo
- February 15: Flirty Dancing on ETC
- February 16: Headline Pilipinas Weekend (Sunday edition) on DZMM TeleRadyo
- February 17: Planet Earth II and Price of Passion on GMA News TV
- February 24: Man x Man on GMA News TV
- February 27: Survivor: Winners at War on Solar Sports
- February 29: UGB MMA Fighters Boot Camp and UGB MMA Rampage on Solar Sports
- March 2: EZ Shop on 5 Plus (now One Sports)
- March 8: O Shopping on Jeepney TV
- March 8: Basketball Science, Geeks & Gamers Guide and The Huddle on One Sports
- March 9: Zoey's Extraordinary Playlist on ETC
- March 12: WWE Raw on One Sports
- March 14: Kuwentuhang Lokal on DZMM Teleradyo
- March 14: Project Destination on GMA News TV
- March 16: Kapamilya Daily Mass on DZMM TeleRadyo, Jeepney TV and S+A
- March 17: One News Now on One PH
- March 18: Dos por Dos, Failon Ngayon sa DZMM, Garantisadong Balita, Headline Pilipinas, Kabayan, Lingkod Kapamilya sa DZMM, On the Spot, Pasada 630 (first 30 minutes only), SRO: Suhestyon, Reaksyon at Opinyon and TV Patrol on ANC
- March 19: ANC Rundown, Top Story and The World Tonight on DZMM TeleRadyo
- March 20: Labor of Love on ANC
- March 21: Good Job, Headline Pilipinas Weekend (Saturday edition), Konsyumer Atbp. (first 30 minutes only), Magandang Morning with Julius and Zen, Omaga-Diaz Report, Radyo Patrol Balita Alas-Siyete Weekend Edition, Tandem: Lima at Logan, TV Patrol Weekend and Usapang Kalye on ANC
- March 21: TV Patrol Weekend on DZMM TeleRadyo
- March 21: 24 Oras Weekend, Francis "Kiko" FLores on Board (Dobol B sa News TV), Super Balita sa Hapon Weekend (Dobol B sa News TV) and Super Balita sa Tanghali Weekend (Dobol B sa News TV) on GMA News TV
- March 22: Boses ng Balita, DZBB Executive Summary and TKO: Talakayan Komentaryo't Opinyon on GMA News TV (Dobol B sa News TV)
- March 22: Sunday TV Mass on One Sports
- March 23: Public Briefing: #LagingHandaPH on ANC, CNN Philippines, DZMM TeleRadyo, DZRH News Television, One News and One PH (simulcast via People's Television Network)
- March 23: 24 Oras, Public Briefing: #LagingHandaPH, Super Balita sa Hapon (Dobol B sa News TV) and Super Balita sa Tanghali Nationwide (Dobol B sa News TV) on GMA News TV
- March 25: Kuwentuhang Lokal on ANC
- March 26: Dateline Philippines on DZMM TeleRadyo
- April 1: Team Fitfil on S+A
- April 2: Early Edition, Headstart, Market Edge and Matters of Fact on DZMM TeleRadyo and S+A
- April 4: PJ Masks (season 1) on Yey!
- April 6: Rusty Rivets on Yey!
- April 11: Ninjago: Masters of Spinjitzu (seasons 1 and 2) on Yey!
- April 12: Kapamilya Journeys of Hope on Jeepney TV and Metro Channel
- April 12: NCIS: Los Angeles season 9 on Movie Central
- April 13: Pop Babies on Yey!
- April 20: The Final Word on CNN Philippines
- April 25: Little Juan's Playlist on INC TV
- May 2: CNN 10 on CNN Philippines
- May 3: Uncle Grandpa on CNN Philippines
- May 3: ETC Flix on ETC
- May 8: TV Patrol on Cine Mo!
- May 8: ANC, Balita Ngayon (3rd incarnation), Dos por Dos, Failon Ngayon sa TeleRadyo, Dr. Love Radio Show, Garantisadong Balita, Headline Pilipinas, Kabayan, Lingkod Kapamilya sa TeleRadyo, News Patrol, Pasada sa TeleRadyo, Public Briefing: #LagingHandaPH, Radyo Patrol Balita Alas-Siyete, SRO: Suhestyon, Reaksyon at Opinyon, Todo-Todo Walang Preno, TeleRadyo Special Coverage and TV Patrol on TeleRadyo
- May 9: TV Patrol Weekend on Cine Mo!
- May 9: Get Fit, Life at Home and What Makes Me Happy? on CNN Philippines
- May 9: Good Job, Headline Pilipinas (Saturday edition), Kape at Salita, Konsyumer Atbp., Kuwentuhang Lokal, Light Moments, Magandang Morning, Omaga-Diaz Report, Radyo Negosyo, Radyo Patrol Balita Alas-Siyete Weekend, Tandem: Lima at Logan, TV Patrol Weekend and Usapang Kalye on TeleRadyo
- May 10: I Feel U on Jeepney TV
- May 10: Dra. Bles @ Ur Serbis, Kapamilya Konek, Red Alert sa TeleRadyo, Rosary Hour, Sagot Ko 'Yan!, The Healing Eucharist, Tulong Ko, Pasa Mo and Yesterday on TeleRadyo
- May 11: I Feel U on Cinema One and Myx
- May 11: Team FitFil on Liga
- May 11: Kongsuni and Friends on Yey!
- May 13: Madam Secretary (season 6) on ETC
- May 13: Kuwentuhang Lokal on TeleRadyo
- May 16: Meet The Millenials on CNN Philippines
- May 16: Flirty Dancing (season 2) on ETC
- May 16: Kapamilya Daily Mass on TeleRadyo
- May 17: Lingkod Aksyon on TeleRadyo
- May 18: News.PH (2nd incarnation) on CNN Philippines
- May 18: Extreme Animal Babies and Balitang Amianan (GMA Regional TV Strip) on GMA News TV
- May 19: Balitang Bisdak (GMA Regional TV Strip) on GMA News TV
- May 20: One Western Visayas (GMA Regional TV Strip) on GMA News TV
- May 21: One Mindanao (GMA Regional TV Strip) on GMA News TV
- May 22: GMA Regional TV Live! (GMA Regional TV Strip) on GMA News TV
- May 23: #WFH on CNN Philippines
- May 23: Cata on GMA News TV
- May 23: Tropang Torpe on Viva TV
- May 24: Man of the House on ANC
- May 25: ETCinema on ETC
- June 3: Hidden Love on GMA News TV
- June 5: At Home with GMA Regional TV (GMA Regional TV Strip) on GMA News TV
- June 7: Swak na Swak on ANC
- June 8: Bigtime Balita (Dobol B sa News TV), Saksi and SOS Serbisyo on the Spot (Dobol B sa News TV), on GMA News TV
- June 8: Idol in Action on One PH
- June 13: It's Showtime, Kapamilya Action Sabado, Kapamilya Daily Mass, KB Family Weekend, KB Family Weekend Rewind, Maalaala Mo Kaya, Paano Kita Mapasasalamatan?, Super Kapamilya Blockbusters, Team Fitfil and The Voice Teens season 2 on Kapamilya Channel
- June 13: Masha and the Bear on Yey!
- June 14: ASAP Natin 'To, FPJ: Da King, G Diaries, Iba 'Yan!, Ipaglaban Mo!, Movie Central Presents, Sunday's Best, The Healing Eucharist and Wikaharian on Kapamilya Channel
- June 15: FPJ's Ang Probinsyano on Cine Mo!
- June 15: A Soldier's Heart, Familiar Wife, FPJ's Ang Probinsyano, Kabayan, Kapamilya Blockbusters, Kapamilya Gold Hits, Love Thy Woman, Magandang Buhay, News Patrol, Radyo Patrol Balita Alas-Siyete and The World of a Married Couple on Kapamilya Channel
- June 15: Betty en NY on One Screen
- June 17: PBA Greatest Games on One Sports
- June 19: Riverdale season 1 on One Screen
- June 20: Hollywood Cineplex and Regal Originals on One Screen
- June 21: Gordon Ramsay's 24 Hours to Hell and Back on ETC
- June 21: Good Vibes with Edu on Metro Channel
- June 21: Sportspage on One Sports
- June 22: Sportspage on One PH, One Sports+ and PBA Rush
- June 22: Garlic on One Screen
- June 25: The Huddle on One PH
- June 26: Jumpball on One PH
- June 28: ASAP Natin 'To on Metro Channel
- June 29: Cardcaptor Sakura: Clear Card on Yey!
- July 1: Rise and Shine on Myx
- July 3: Friday Movie Timeout on Solar Sports
- July 4: Action Flicks and Strictly Pinoy on Heart of Asia
- July 5: Feel na Films and Screams on Screen on Heart of Asia
- July 5: ESPN's Boxing Greatest Fights on One Sports
- July 5: Sunday Mass Live on TeleRadyo
- July 11: Jumpball on One Sports
- July 17: The Exchange with Rico Hizon on CNN Philippines
- July 19: Paano Kita Mapasasalamatan? (season 1) on Jeepney TV
- July 19: UFC Fight Night on One Sports
- July 20: New Normal: The Survival Guide and Power Block on GMA News TV
  - July 20: Front Row (Power Block) and Newsmakers (New Normal: The Survival Guide)
  - July 21: Alisto (Power Block) and Bright Side (New Normal: The Survival Guide)
  - July 22: Pera Paraan (New Normal: The Survival Guide) and Tunay na Buhay (Power Block)
  - July 23: Home Work (New Normal: The Survival Guide) and Reporter's Notebook (Power Block)
  - July 24: Family Time (New Normal: The Survival Guide) and i-Witness (Power Block)
- July 20: Iba 'Yan! (season 1) on Jeepney TV
- July 20: O Shopping on Kapamilya Channel
- July 25: One Up on One Sports
- July 27: 2gether: The Series, TV Patrol and The World Tonight on Kapamilya Channel
- August 1: TV Patrol Weekend on Kapamilya Channel
- August 1: Bakbakan Na on One Sports
- August 2: Thunderbird Sabong Nation and Tukaan on One Sports
- August 3: Network Briefing News on One PH
- August 3: BGC News on Viva TV
- August 9: Negosyuniversity on INC TV
- August 10: The Chefs' Line (season 2) on ETC
- August 15: Still 2gether on Kapamilya Channel
- August 16: Usapang Real Life on Colours
- August 17: Fit for Life on Colours
- August 17: Nakee on GMA News TV
- August 17: Ang sa Iyo ay Akin on Jeepney TV and Kapamilya Channel
- August 18: Chika, Besh! on Colours
- August 22: Mind S-Cool on CNN Philippines
- August 24: Celebrity Top 10 on One News and One PH
- August 24: Love Life on One Screen
- August 28: PBA 3-Point Shootout Virtual Charity Tournament on PBA Rush
- August 29: The Hoptimist on CNN Philippines
- August 29: Ride PH (season 3) on One News
- August 29: TeleBalita Weekend, Winner sa Life and Your Daily Do's on TeleRadyo
- August 29: Band on the Run on Viva TV
- August 31: Dos Por Dos sa DZRH and MBC Network News (noontime, evening and late-night editions) on DZRH News Television
- August 31: Playback on TeleRadyo
- September 5: Sagupaan TV on One Sports
- September 9: TeleBalita on Kapamilya Channel and TeleRadyo
- September 12: Team Yey! on Kapamilya Channel
- September 13: PPop Generation Party on Viva TV
- September 14: My Absolute Boyfriend on GMA News TV
- September 18: GMA Regional TV Early Edition (GMA Regional TV Strip) on GMA News TV
- September 19: Saturday Cinema Hits on GMA News TV
- September 20: HallyStage, JYP's Party People, Music Bank, Running Man, Sidewalk Talk and StarGazeMuzik on Hallypop
- September 21: Everywhere I Go (ETCerye) on ETC
- September 21: Legend of Fuyao on GMA News TV
- September 21: K-pop Star on Hallypop
- September 21: Gising Pilipinas!, Hinahanap-Hanap Kita and TeleRadyo Balita on Kapamilya Channel
- September 21: TeleRadyo Balita on TeleRadyo
- September 26: Business Above Usual and TeleRadyo Balita Weekend on TeleRadyo
- September 27: Secret Seven, Sine Date Weekends, The Big Picture and Toriko (season 3) on GMA News TV
- September 28: Walang Hanggang Paalam on Jeepney TV and Kapamilya Channel
- October 2: Ask Angelica on Cinema One
- October 3: Buhay na Buhay (season 2) on ANC
- October 3: Ask Angelica on Jeepney TV
- October 3: Swak na Swak on Kapamilya Channel
- October 4: We Rise Together on Jeepney TV
- October 5: Feelings, Frontline Pilipinas, Radyo5 Network News and Ted Failon at DJ Chacha sa Radyo5 on One PH
- October 10: Raket Science on One PH
- October 10: Bida Konsyumer on TeleRadyo
- October 11: Masaganang Buhay on One PH
- October 12: Usap Tayo: Super Kuwentuhan with Mark and Susan (Dobol B sa News TV) on GMA News TV
- October 12: Game Ka Na Ba? (2nd incarnation; season 1) on Jeepney TV
- October 12: Agham, Inc. and Wok of Love on One Screen
- October 17: Buena Manong Balita (Saturday edition) (Dobol B sa News TV) and Pinoy Movie Break on GMA News TV
- October 18: Sunday 'Kada and Sunday Noontime Live! on Colours
- October 18: Bite Me on Metro Channel
- October 18: I Got You on One Screen
- October 18: NBA Spotlight on One Sports
- October 19: Lunch Out Loud on Colours
- October 19: Endless Love (season 1) (ETCerye) on ETC
- October 23: Mornings with GMA Regional TV (GMA Regional TV Strip) on GMA News TV
- October 24: Your Light Forever on INC TV
- October 24: I Can See Your Voice season 3 on Kapamilya Channel
- October 24: Coolest Places to Stay on Metro Channel
- October 24: Oh My Dad! (season 1) on One Screen
- October 25: Holiday Gifts on GMA News TV
- October 25: Rated Korina and The Dean Mel Show on One PH
- October 26: Bagong Umaga and Sakto on Kapamilya Channel
- October 27: Don't Give Up on INC TV
- October 31: VIVAriety on Viva TV
- November 1: Ghost Adventures (season 2) on Sari-Sari Channel
- November 2: Dama on One Screen
- November 2: EZ Shop on Heart of Asia
- November 2: The Today Show on TAP TV
- November 3: Heads Up!, Little Big Shots: Forever Young, Little Big Shots USA, Miracle Hunter, NBC Nightly News and The Tonight Show Starring Jimmy Fallon on TAP TV
- November 5: Food Unwrapped on TAP TV
- November 6: Who Do You Think You Are? USA on TAP TV
- November 7: OMJ: Oh My Job! (Dobol B sa News TV) and Running Man (Hallypop Strip) on GMA News TV
- November 7: Design Junkies and Superfoods: The Real Story on TAP TV
- November 8: Culinary Bluprint, ES.TV and TAP TV Sunday Movies (now Hit Flix) on TAP TV
- November 9: Extraordinary You and Music Bank (Hallypop Strip) on GMA News TV
- November 9: HaPinay on TeleRadyo
- November 14: Kalderoke on Kapamilya Channel
- November 14: Tech Ka Muna on One PH
- November 16: Reply 1988 on One Screen
- November 19: IRL on GMA News TV
- November 24: Ate ng Ate Ko and Paano ang Pasko? on One Screen
- November 25: Stay-In Love on One Screen
- November 26: Sleepless on One Screen
- November 27: Carpool on One Screen
- November 27: Bella Bandida on Sari-Sari Channel
- November 28: Business Matters (season 5) on CNN Philippines
- November 28: Afternoon Movie Break on GMA News TV
- November 28: Kagat ng Dilim (2020) on Sari-Sari Channel
- November 29: Luckyng Tulong on Cine Mo! and Kapamilya Channel
- December 1: Daily Pop and The Kelly Clarkson Show on TAP TV
- December 2: Front & Center on CNN Philippines
- December 6: Mr. Player on Heart of Asia
- December 6: Pinoy Big Brother: Connect on Kapamilya Channel
- December 7: Rising Sun on GMA News TV
- December 7: The Game on One News and One Sports+
- December 7: Tierra de reyes on One Screen
- December 14: Born Beautiful: The Series on One Screen
- December 19: eXes and whYs with Pops and Martin and From Helen's Kitchen (season 3) on Colours
- December 19: Konsyumer Atbp. on GMA News TV (Dobol B sa News TV)
- December 20: Louie O Live with Robin on Colours
- December 21: Where Stars Land on GMA News TV
- December 26: Juander Titser on TeleRadyo

==== Re-runs ====
- January 4: Goin' Bulilit on Yey!^{1}^{8}
- January 6: Nang Ngumiti ang Langit on Jeepney TV^{1}
- January 6: Digimon Tamers on Yey!^{1}^{9}
- January 11: I Can Do That on Jeepney TV^{1}
- January 11: Max Steel (season 1) on Yey!^{1}
- January 13: Niño on Fox Filipino (now defunct)^{2}
- January 13: Annaliza (2013) on Jeepney TV^{1}
- January 27: Something in the Rain on Asianovela Channel
- January 27: My Sassy Girl and Rakshasa Street on GMA News TV^{2}
- January 27: Muling Buksan ang Puso and Precious Hearts Romances Presents: Somewhere in My Heart on Jeepney TV^{1}
- February 2: Till I Met You on Jeepney TV^{1}
- February 3: Two Cops on Asianovela Channel
- February 3: Katorse on Jeepney TV^{1}
- February 10: 100 Days My Prince on Asianovela Channel^{1}
- February 10: Inday Bote and Pieta on Jeepney TV^{1}
- February 17: Pati Ba Pintig ng Puso on Fox Filipino (now defunct)^{2}
- February 17: Precious Hearts Romances Presents: My Cheating Heart on Jeepney TV^{1}
- February 22: Halik on Jeepney TV^{1}
- February 23: U-Prince Presents on GMA News TV^{2}
- February 24: May Isang Pangarap on Jeepney TV^{1}
- February 24: Inazuma Eleven GO: Chrono Stone, Marcelino Pan y Vino^{1} and One-Punch Man season 1^{1} on Yey!
- March 2: Goblin on Asianovela Channel^{1}
- March 2: Aladdin: You Would've Heard the Name on GMA News TV^{2}
- March 2: Magpahanggang Wakas and Precious Hearts Romances Presents: Los Bastardos on Jeepney TV^{1}
- March 9: Mother on Asianovela Channel
- March 9: My Faithful Husband on Fox Filipino (now defunct)^{2}
- March 9: You're My Home on Jeepney TV^{1}
- March 9: Naruto^{1}^{9} and Yu-Gi-Oh! Zexal (season 1)^{1}^{6}^{9} on Yey!
- March 16: Tomorrow, With You and Touch Your Heart^{1} on Asianovela Channel
- March 16: FPJ's Ang Probinsyano: Ang Simula^{1}^{4}, Precious Hearts Romances Presents: Quikilig!^{1} and Wildflower^{1} on Jeepney TV
- March 16: Digimon Frontier on Yey!^{1}^{9}^{15}
- March 28: FlordeLiza on Jeepney TV^{1}
- March 30: A Love So Beautiful^{1} and Meteor Garden (2001)^{1}^{2}^{7}^{16} on Asianovela Channel
- March 30: Playhouse on Jeepney TV^{1}
- April 6: Ika-6 na Utos on Fox Filipino (now defunct)^{2}
- April 6: The Promise of Forever on Jeepney TV^{1}
- April 13: Black on Asianovela Channel^{1}
- April 18: Celebrity Playtime on Jeepney TV^{1}
- April 20: Go Back Couple on Asianovela Channel^{1}
- April 20: Marina and Wansapanataym Presents on Jeepney TV^{1}
- April 20: Adventures of Sonic the Hedgehog on Yey!^{2}
- April 27: W on Asianovela Channel^{1}
- May 2: Adventure Time^{3} and Dexter's Laboratory^{3}^{15} on CNN Philippines
- May 4: What's Wrong with Secretary Kim on Asianovela Channel^{1}
- May 4: Inazuma Eleven GO: Galaxy, Pororo the Little Penguin^{2} and Remi, Nobody's Girl^{1} on Yey!
- May 8: Kuha Mo! on TeleRadyo^{1}
- May 13: S.O.C.O.: Scene of the Crime Operatives on TeleRadyo^{1}
- May 16: Starla on Jeepney TV^{1}^{5}
- May 20: Rated K on TeleRadyo^{1}
- May 25: Digimon Xros Wars on Yey!^{1}^{9}
- June 1: Story of Yanxi Palace on Asianovela Channel^{1}
- June 1: Got to Believe, On the Wings of Love and Tubig at Langis on Jeepney TV^{1}
- June 7: You're My Home on Jeepney TV^{1}
- June 13: Bayani, Epol/Apple, Hiraya Manawari, Kuha Mo!, S.O.C.O.: Scene of the Crime Operatives and Sine'skwela on Kapamilya Channel^{1}
- June 14: MathDali^{1}^{23} and Starla^{1}^{5} on Kapamilya Channel
- June 15: Banana Sundae, I Can See Your Voice season 1, Meteor Garden (2018), Pinoy Big Brother: Balikbahay Edition and The General's Daughter on Kapamilya Channel^{1}
- June 15: Kano Luvs Pinay^{3}, LolaBasyang.com^{3}, Majika^{2}^{18}, Marimar (1994)^{2}^{16}^{17} and Yagit (2014)^{2}^{18} on One Screen
- June 15: Judy Abbott^{1}^{16}, Peter Pan and Wendy^{1}^{15} and Samurai X^{1}^{9}^{15}^{16} on Yey!
- June 16: W on Kapamilya Channel^{1}^{21}
- June 21: Pangako sa 'Yo (2015) on Jeepney TV^{1}
- June 22: Magpahanggang Wakas on Jeepney TV^{1}
- June 22: Tukhang on One Screen^{3}
- June 24: Ipaglaban Mo! on TeleRadyo^{1}^{8}
- June 27: My Hero Academia season 2 and Power Rangers Dino Charge on Yey!
- June 29: Amaya^{2}^{7}^{18}, Dong Yi^{2}^{7}, Ikaw Lang ang Mamahalin (2011)^{2}, Legacy^{2}^{18}, Love in Trouble^{2}, Sky Castle^{2}, Starry Night, Starry Sea^{2}, T.G.I.S.^{2}^{18} and You're My Destiny^{2}^{7} on Heart of Asia
- June 29: 100 Days to Heaven on Jeepney TV^{1}
- July 7: The King is in Love on Kapamilya Channel^{1}^{21}
- July 13: Bud Brothers and Forevermore on Jeepney TV^{1}
- July 18: Good Vibes with Edu^{20} and The Kids' Choice^{1}^{5} on Jeepney TV
- July 27: Kidlat on One Screen^{3}
- July 31: DC's Legends of Tomorrow season 1 on One Screen^{3}^{12}^{13}
- August 1: Goin' Bulilit on Kapamilya Channel^{1}^{5}^{8}
- August 3: Waves of Life on Heart of Asia^{2}
- August 3: Agua Bendita on Jeepney TV^{1}
- August 8: Batibot on Colours^{1}^{2}^{3}^{17}^{2}
- August 10: Fighter of Destiny on Heart of Asia^{2}
- August 11: Black on Kapamilya Channel^{1}^{21}
- August 17: The Good Manager^{7} and Whisper^{2} on Heart of Asia
- August 17: Code Name: Terrius^{1} and Weightlifting Fairy^{1}^{21} on Kapamilya Channel
- August 22: The Kids' Choice on Jeepney TV^{1}^{5}
- August 22: Kadenang Ginto (season 1) on Kapamilya Channel^{1}
- August 31: The Orbiters on One Screen^{3}^{9}
- August 31: Las Amazonas on Telenovela Channel
- September 5: Spartan Race: Ultimate Team Challenge (season 2) on Solar Sports^{12}
- September 6: I Dare You on Jeepney TV^{1}
- September 7: Street Fighter: Assassin's Fist on GMA News TV^{2}
- September 7: A Love to Last on Jeepney TV^{1}
- September 12: Two Wives (2014) on Jeepney TV^{1}
- September 12: Pop Babies^{5}, Robocar Poli^{5} and The Adventures of Tom Sawyer^{1}^{5} on Kapamilya Channel
- September 14: Langit Lupa on Jeepney TV^{1}
- September 14: The Good Son on Kapamilya Channel^{1}^{8}
- September 21: Marrying My Daughter Twice^{7} and The Big One^{2} on Heart of Asia
- September 21: Huwag Ka Lang Mawawala and The Greatest Love on Jeepney TV^{1}
- September 21: Ang Lihim ni Annasandra^{2} and Feels Like Forever^{3}^{9} on One Screen
- September 27: Ben 10: Alien Force^{2}^{3}, Bleach (season 1)^{2}, Jackie Chan Adventures^{1}^{2}^{12}, Piggy Tales: Third Act^{2}, Pokémon the Series: XYZ^{2} and Ugly Duckling^{2} on GMA News TV
- September 28: Princess Hours (2017) and Queen of Mystery on Heart of Asia^{2}
- October 5: Oh My Ghost on GMA News TV^{2}
- October 10: Doble Kara on Jeepney TV^{1}
- October 12: Honesto on Jeepney TV^{1}
- October 12: I am Not a Robot^{1}^{21} and Love in Sadness^{1} on Kapamilya Channel
- October 18: Tanging Yaman on Jeepney TV^{1}
- October 19: I Have a Lover on Kapamilya Channel^{1}
- October 19: Passion and Power on Telenovela Channel
- October 26: Wicked Angel on Heart of Asia^{2}
- October 26: The Neighbor on Telenovela Channel
- October 31: Hiwaga ng Kambat on Jeepney TV^{1}
- November 2: Anna KareNina (2013)^{2}, Hit the Top^{7}, Super Twins^{2}^{18}, The Fox Fairy^{2}^{7} and Woman of Dignity^{2} on Heart of Asia
- November 2: Goodbye Mr. Black^{21} and Story of Yanxi Palace^{1}^{21} on Kapamilya Channel
- November 6: Car Matchmaker (season 2) on Solar Sports^{12}
- November 6: Repeat After Me on TAP TV^{13}
- November 7: The Biggest Loser season 17: Temptation Nation on Solar Sports^{12}
- November 7: Ellen's Design Challenge on TAP TV^{13}
- November 9: Budoy, Dyesebel (2014) and The Killer Bride on Jeepney TV^{1}
- November 9: Third Eye on One Screen^{3}
- November 12: DC's Legends of Tomorrow season 2 on One Screen^{3}^{12}^{13}
- November 13: Gotham season 1 on One Screen^{3}^{12}^{14}
- November 21: Dream Dad on Jeepney TV^{1}
- November 23: Stairway to Heaven (2003) on GMA News TV^{2}
- November 23: Mula sa Puso (2011) on Jeepney TV^{1}
- November 23: Love You Two on One Screen^{2}
- November 29: Charming Girl on Heart of Asia^{2}
- November 29: Pepito Manaloto: Ang Tunay na Kwento on One Screen^{2}
- November 30: Switch on Heart of Asia^{2}
- November 30: The Three Sides of Ana on Telenovela Channel
- December 7: Superstore season 3 on ETC^{12}
- December 7: Into the World Again on Heart of Asia^{7}
- December 7: Give Love on Christmas on Jeepney TV^{1}
- December 14: Emperor: Ruler of the Mask on Heart of Asia^{2}
- December 14: Lorenzo's Time on Jeepney TV^{1}
- December 14: Go Back Couple on Kapamilya Channel^{1}^{21}
- December 28: Moribito Final and My Daughter, Geum Sa-wol on Heart of Asia^{2}
- Notes
1. ^ ^{a} Originally aired on ABS-CBN
2. ^ ^{b} Originally aired on GMA
3. ^ ^{c} Originally aired on TV5
4. ^ ^{d} Originally aired on Cine Mo!
5. ^ ^{e} Originally aired on Yey!
6. ^ ^{f} Originally aired on S+A
7. ^ ^{g} Originally aired on GMA News TV
8. ^ ^{h} Originally aired on Jeepney TV
9. ^ ^{i} Originally aired on Sari-Sari Channel
10. ^ ^{j} Originally aired on Hero (now defunct)
11. ^ ^{k} Originally aired on ETC
12. ^ ^{l} Originally aired on Jack TV (now defunct)
13. ^ ^{m} Originally aired on 2nd Avenue (now defunct)
14. ^ ^{n} Originally aired on CT (now defunct)
15. ^ ^{o} Originally aired on Studio 23 (now S+A)
16. ^ ^{p} Originally aired on Q (now GMA News TV)
17. ^ ^{q} Originally aired on RPN (now CNN Philippines)
18. ^ ^{r} Originally aired on Fox Filipino (now defunct)
19. ^ ^{s} Originally aired on Kapamilya Channel
20. ^ ^{t} Originally aired on Metro Channel
21. ^ ^{u} Originally aired on Asianovela Channel
22. ^ ^{v} Originally aired on PTV
23. ^ ^{w} Originally aired on Knowledge Channel

=== Video streaming services ===
The following are programs that debuted on video streaming services:

- January 17: Ampalaya Chronicles on iWant
- January 22: My Single Lady on iWant
- February 21: I Am U on iWant
- March 13: Fluid on iWant
- March 18: The Tapes on iWant
- March 29: Mystified on iflix
- April 3: Jet and the Pet Rangers on iWant
- May 22: Gameboys (season 1) on YouTube (The IdeaFirst Company)
- June 24: Hello Stranger on YouTube (Black Sheep)
- July 15: Beauty Queens on iWant
- July 16: Unconditional on Cignal Play
- September 4: Quaranthings (season 1) on YouTube (Ride or Die)
- September 25: Gaya Sa Pelikula on YouTube (Globe Studios)
- September 26: Coke Studio: Peel Mo, Panalo Promo on YouTube (Coke Studio Philippines)
- October 15: Ben X Jim (season 1) on YouTube (Regal Entertainment)
- October 18: Boys' Lockdown on YouTube (Ticket2Me)
- October 23: Pearl Next Door on YouTube (The IdeaFirst Company)
- October 24: The House Arrest of Us on iWantTFC and KTX
- October 28: Knorr Christmas Kitchen on iWantTFC
- November 5: Oh, Mando! on iWantTFC
- November 6: Beauty and the Boss on WeTV iflix
- November 14: La Vida Lena (pilot series) on iWantTFC
- November 18: Loving Emily on iWantTFC
- December 12: Barangay 143 (season 2) on POPTV
- December 14: Bawal Lumabas: The Series on iWantTFC

== Returning or renamed programs ==
=== Major networks ===
Show	Last aired	Retitled as/Season/Notes	Channel	Return date
WWE Raw	2019	Same	5	January 18
The Voice Teens	2017	Same (season 2)	ABS-CBN	February 8
Descendants of the Sun	2016	Same (Philippine adaptation)	GMA	February 10
Philippine Basketball Association	2020 (season 44: "Governors' Cup")	Same (season 45: "Philippine Cup")	5 / PBA Rush / One Sports	March 8
Doc McStuffins	2015	Same (season 4: "Toy Hospital")	5	May 4
The Atom Araullo Specials	2019	Same	GMA	May 31
Wanted	2012	Idol in Action	5	June 8
Wish Ko Lang!	2020	Same	GMA	July 11
One Piece	2017	Same (season 11)	GMA	July 13
DC's Legends of Tomorrow	2020	Same (season 2)	5	August 11
Talentadong Pinoy	2014	Bangon Talentadong Pinoy	TV5	August 15
Gotham	2020	Same (season 2)	TV5	September 3
The Clash	2019	Same (season 3)	GMA	October 3
Failon Ngayon sa TeleRadyo	2020 (TeleRadyo)	Ted Failon at DJ Chacha sa Radyo5	TV5 / One PH	October 5
Pepito Manaloto	2020	Kuwento Kuwento	GMA	October 10
The Shannara Chronicles	2018	Same (season 2)	GMA	October 12
Banana Sundae	2020 (ABS-CBN)	Sunday 'Kada	TV5 / Colours	October 18
Home Sweetie Home	2020 (ABS-CBN)	Oh My Dad!	TV5 / One Screen	October 24
Rated K	2020 (ABS-CBN / Jeepney TV / TeleRadyo)	Rated Korina	TV5 / One PH	October 24
I Can See Your Voice	2020 (ABS-CBN)	Same (season 3)	A2Z / Kapamilya Channel	October 24
Christmas Cartoon Festival Presents	2016	Same	GMA	November 23
Kagat ng Dilim	2002 (IBC)	Same (2020)	TV5	November 27
Pinoy Big Brother	2019 (ABS-CBN; season 8: "Otso")	Same (season 9: "Connect")	A2Z / Kapamilya Channel	December 6
From Helen's Kitchen	2019	Same (season 3)	TV5 / Colours	December 19
National Basketball Association	2020	Same (2020–21 season)	TV5 / One Sports / NBA TV Philippines	December 23

=== State-owned networks ===
Show	Last aired	Retitled as/Season/Notes	Channel	Return date
Kerygma TV	2019	Feast TV	IBC	January 5
Tutok Tulfo	2012 (5 / AksyonTV)	Tutok Tulfo 2.0	PTV	April 20
Counterpoint	2011 (IBC)	Same (2nd incarnation)	PTV	May 1
Ulat Bayan	2017	Same (weekday edition)	PTV	September 7
Ulat Bayan	2017	Ulat Bayan Weekend	PTV	September 12

=== Other channels ===
Show	Last aired	Retitled as/Season/Notes	Channel	Return date
Penn & Teller: Fool Us	2019	Same (season 5)	Jack TV (now defunct)	January 12
Jamie & Jimmy's Food Fight Club	2017 (2nd Avenue)	Same (season 4)	ETC	January 12
U.S. NCAA Women's College Basketball	2019	Same (2019–20 season)	5 Plus (now One Sports)	January 20
BFF: Beauty, Fun & Fashion	2011 (RHTV)	Same (2nd incarnation)	DZRH News Television	January 27
30 for 30	2019 (AksyonTV)	Same	5 Plus (now One Sports)	February 8
Survivor	2019 (Jack TV; season 39: "Island of the Idols")	Same (season 40: "Winners at War")	Solar Sports	February 27
Philippine Super Liga	2019 (season 7: "Invitational Conference")	Same (season 8: "Grand Prix Conference")	5 Plus (now One Sports; free-to-air) / One Sports (now One Sports+; cable)	February 29
PBA Developmental League	2019 (season 8: "Aspirants' Cup")	Same (season 9: "Aspirants' Cup")	5 Plus (now One Sports; free-to-air) / One Sports (now One Sports+; cable) / PBA Rush (cable)	March 2
EZ Shop	2019	Same	5 Plus (now One Sports)	March 2
WWE Raw	2019 (AksyonTV)	Same	One Sports	March 12
TV Patrol Sabado/Linggo	2010	TV Patrol Weekend	DZMM TeleRadyo (now TeleRadyo)	March 21
NCIS: Los Angeles	2018 (Cine Mo! / S+A)	Same (season 9)	Movie Central	April 12
ETC Flix	2018	Same	ETC	May 3
Failon Ngayon sa DZMM	2020 (DZMM TeleRadyo)	Failon Ngayon sa TeleRadyo	TeleRadyo	May 8
Lingkod Kapamilya sa DZMM	2020 (DZMM TeleRadyo)	Lingkod Kapamilya sa TeleRadyo	TeleRadyo	May 8
Pasada Sais Trenta	2020 (DZMM TeleRadyo)	Pasada sa TeleRadyo	TeleRadyo	May 8
DZMM Balita Ngayon	2020 (DZMM TeleRadyo)	Balita Ngayon (3rd incarnation)	TeleRadyo	May 8
DZMM Special Coverage	2020 (DZMM TeleRadyo)	TeleRadyo Special Coverage	TeleRadyo	May 8
Red Alert sa DZMM	2020 (DZMM TeleRadyo)	Red Alert sa TeleRadyo	TeleRadyo	May 10
Flirty Dancing	2020	Same (season 2)	ETC	May 16
News.PH	2017	Same (as a Filipino–language newcast)	CNN Philippines	May 18
Kapamilya Super Blockbusters	2020 (ABS-CBN)	Super Kapamilya Blockbusters	Kapamilya Channel	June 13
Ang Hari: Da King on ABS-CBN	2020 (ABS-CBN)	FPJ: Da King	Kapamilya Channel	June 14
Cardcaptor Sakura	2009 (GMA)	Clear Card	Yey!	June 29
ESPN's Boxing Greatest Fights	2019 (AksyonTV)	Same	One Sports	July 11
One Up	2019	Same (season 2)	One Sports	July 25
The Chefs' Line	2018 (2nd Avenue)	Same (season 2)	ETC	August 10
Ride PH	2019	Same (season 3)	One News	August 29
Healthy Sabado	2020 (DZMM TeleRadyo)	Your Daily Do's	TeleRadyo	August 29
SikaPinoy	2013 (DZMM TeleRadyo)	Winner sa Life	TeleRadyo	August 29
Radyo Patrol Balita Alas-Siyete Weekend	2020	TeleBalita Weekend	TeleRadyo	August 29
DZRH Network News	2020	MBC Network News (noontime edition)	DZRH News Television	August 31
Dos por Dos	2020 (ANC / TeleRadyo)	Dos por Dos sa DZRH	DZRH News Television	August 31
DZRH Evening News	2020	MBC Network News (evening edition)	DZRH News Television	August 31
On the Spot	2020 (DZMM TeleRadyo)	Same (as a news and commentary program)	TeleRadyo	September 1
Radyo Patrol Balita Alas-Siyete	2020	TeleBalita	Kapamilya Channel / TeleRadyo	September 9
Team Yey!	2020 (Yey!)	Same (season 5)	Kapamilya Channel	September 12
Gising Pilipinas!	2020 (DZMM TeleRadyo)	Same	Kapamilya Channel / TeleRadyo	September 21
TeleBalita	2020	TeleRadyo Balita	Kapamilya Channel / TeleRadyo	September 21
TeleBalita Weekend	2020	TeleRadyo Balita Weekend	TeleRadyo	September 26
Radyo Negosyo	2020	Business Above Usual	TeleRadyo	September 26
Toriko	2016 (GMA)	Same (season 3)	GMA News TV	September 27
Buhay na Buhay	2018 (GMA News TV)	Same (season 2)	ANC	October 3
Game Ka Na Ba?	2009 (ABS-CBN)	Same (2nd incarnation; season 1)	Jeepney TV	October 12
Sakto	2020 (DZMM TeleRadyo)	Same	Kapamilya Channel / TeleRadyo	October 26
Business Matters	2019	Same (season 5)	CNN Philippines	November 28
Pinoy Movie Break	2020	Afternoon Movie Break	GMA News TV	November 28
SportsCenter Philippines	2020 (TV5)	The Game	One News / One Sports+	December 7
Turo-Turo	2020 (DZMM TeleRadyo)	Juander Titser	TeleRadyo	December 26

=== Video streaming services ===
Show	Last aired	Retitled as/Season/Notes	Service	Return date
Pokemon	2019 (GMA; season 19: "XYZ")	Same (season 23: "Journeys")	Netflix	June 12
Coke Studio Philippines	2019 (ABS-CBN)	Same (season 4: "Peel Mo, Panalo Promo")	YouTube (Coke Studio Philippines)	September 26
Salamat Dok	2020 (ABS-CBN / ANC)	Thank You, Doc!	YouTube (Thank You, Doc!)	November 24
Barangay 143	2019 (GMA)	Same (season 2)	POPTV	December 12

== Programs transferring networks ==
=== Major networks ===
Date	Show	No. of seasons	Moved from	Moved to
March 22	Sambuhay TV Mass	—N/a	5	GMA
April 10	The Key of David	—N/a	CNN Philippines	5
May 7	TV Patrol	—N/a	ABS-CBN (now Kapamilya Channel)	ANC
May 8	TV Patrol	—N/a	ABS-CBN (now Kapamilya Channel)	Cine Mo!
May 8	News Patrol	—N/a	ABS-CBN (now Kapamilya Channel)	TeleRadyo
June 7	Kabuhayang Swak na Swak	—N/a	ABS-CBN (now Kapamilya Channel)	ANC
June 13	It's Showtime	—N/a	ABS-CBN (now Kapamilya Channel)	Kapamilya Channel
June 13	Maalaala Mo Kaya	28	ABS-CBN (now Kapamilya Channel)	Kapamilya Channel
June 13	The Voice Teens	2	ABS-CBN (now Kapamilya Channel)	Kapamilya Channel
June 14	ASAP Natin 'To	—N/a	ABS-CBN (now Kapamilya Channel)	Kapamilya Channel
June 14	Ipaglaban Mo!	—N/a	ABS-CBN (now Kapamilya Channel)	Kapamilya Channel
June 15	A Soldier's Heart	2	ABS-CBN (now Kapamilya Channel)	Kapamilya Channel
June 15	FPJ's Ang Probinsyano	8	ABS-CBN (now Kapamilya Channel)	Kapamilya Channel
June 15	Love Thy Woman	1	ABS-CBN (now Kapamilya Channel)	Kapamilya Channel
June 15	Magandang Buhay	—N/a	ABS-CBN (now Kapamilya Channel)	Kapamilya Channel
June 15	News Patrol	—N/a	TeleRadyo	Kapamilya Channel
July 20	Gotham	1	Jack TV (now defunct)	5
July 20	Legends of Tomorrow	1	Jack TV (now defunct)	5
July 25	Ancient Aliens	1	GMA / GMA News TV	5
July 27	TV Patrol	—N/a	Cine Mo!	Kapamilya Channel
July 31	National Basketball Association	—N/a	CNN Philippines	One Sports / NBA TV Philippines
August 1	National Basketball Association	—N/a	CNN Philippines	5
September 6	Home Base Plus	21	GMA News TV	GMA
October 5	Failon Ngayon sa TeleRadyo	—N/a	TeleRadyo	TV5 / One PH (as Ted Failon at DJ Chacha sa Radyo5)
October 17	Jesus the Healer	—N/a	GMA / GMA News TV	A2Z
October 18	Banana Sundae	—N/a	ABS-CBN (now Kapamilya Channel)	TV5 / Colours (as Sunday 'Kada)
October 24	Rated K	—N/a	ABS-CBN (now Kapamilya Channel) / ANC / Jeepney TV / TeleRadyo	TV5 (as Rated Korina)
October 24	Home Sweetie Home	—N/a	ABS-CBN (now Kapamilya Channel)	TV5 (as Oh My Dad!)
October 24	I Can See Your Voice	3	ABS-CBN (now Kapamilya Channel)	A2Z / Kapamilya Channel
November 14	Asenso Pinoy	—N/a	S+A	A2Z
November 27	Kagat ng Dilim	—N/a	IBC	TV5
November 28	Turbo Zone	—N/a	GMA News TV	GMA
December 6	Pinoy Big Brother	9	ABS-CBN (now Kapamilya Channel)	A2Z / Kapamilya Channel
December 13	Pawn Stars	—N/a	GMA News TV	TV5

=== State-owned networks ===
Date	Show	No. of seasons	Moved from	Moved to
April 20	Tutok Tulfo 2.0	—N/a	5 / AksyonTV (now One Sports) (as Tutok Tulfo)	PTV (as Tutok Tulfo 2.0)
May 1	Counterpoint	—N/a	IBC	PTV

=== Minor networks ===
Date	Show	No. of seasons	Moved from	Moved to
February 6	The Medyo Late Night Show with Jojo A.	—N/a	PTV	RJ DigiTV
December 5	Healing Galing Live!	—N/a	TV5 / One PH	UNTV

=== Other channels ===
Date	Show	No. of seasons	Moved from	Moved to
February 8	30 for 30	—N/a	5	5 Plus (now One Sports)
February 27	Survivor	40	Jack TV (now defunct)	Solar Sports
April 12	NCIS: Los Angeles	9	Cine Mo! / S+A	Movie Central
May 8	Balita Ngayon	—N/a	ABS-CBN (now Kapamilya Channel)	TeleRadyo
May 13	Madam Secretary	6 ("The Final Season")	2nd Avenue (now defunct)	ETC
May 16	Talking Heads	—N/a	One Sports	BEAM TV
July 5	ESPN's Boxing Greatest Fights	—N/a	5	One Sports
August 1	Bakbakan Na	—N/a	5	One Sports
August 2	Thunderbird Sabong Nation	—N/a	5	One Sports
August 2	Tukaan	—N/a	5	One Sports
August 31	Dos por Dos	—N/a	ANC / TeleRadyo	DZRH News Television (as Dos por Dos sa DZRH)
September 5	Sagupaan TV	—N/a	S+A	One Sports
September 12	Team Yey!	5	Yey!	Kapamilya Channel
September 27	Toriko	3	GMA	GMA News TV
October 3	Buhay na Buhay	2	GMA News TV	ANC
October 12	Game Ka Na Ba?	—N/a	ABS-CBN (now Kapamilya Channel)	Jeepney TV
November 2	The Today Show	—N/a	Solar News Channel (now CNN Philippines)	TAP TV
November 3	The Tonight Show Starring Jimmy Fallon	—N/a	Jack TV (now defunct)	TAP TV
November 3	NBC Nightly News	—N/a	9TV (now CNN Philippines)	TAP TV
November 3	Little Big Shots USA	1	Yey!	TAP TV
November 5	Who Do You Think You Are? USA	4	Jack TV (now defunct)	TAP TV
November 6	Repeat After Me	1	2nd Avenue (now defunct)	TAP TV
November 7	OMJ!	—N/a	DZMM TeleRadyo (now TeleRadyo) (as a showbiz radio program)	GMA News TV (as OMJ: Oh My Job!; as a public service radio program)
December 19	Konsyumer Atbp.	—N/a	TeleRadyo	GMA News TV

=== Video streaming services ===
Date	Show	No. of seasons	Moved from	Moved to
June 12	Pokémon	23	GMA	Netflix
September 26	Coke Studio Philippines	4	ABS-CBN (now Kapamilya Channel)	YouTube (Coke Studio Philippines)
November 24	Salamat Dok	—N/a	ABS-CBN (now Kapamilya Channel) / ANC	YouTube (Thank You, Doc!)
December 12	Barangay 143	2	GMA	POPTV

== Finales ==
=== Major networks ===
==== ABS-CBN ====
The following are programs that ended on ABS-CBN:

- January 3: Touch Your Heart
- January 10: Starla
- January 17: The Killer Bride
- January 18: Dok Ricky, Pedia
- January 24: Hotel del Luna
- February 2: Your Moment
- February 7: Kadenang Ginto
- February 9: The Haunted
- February 28: Flower Crew: Dating Agency
- March 1: Kapamilya Super Blockbusters
- March 6: I Have a Lover
- March 8: Gandang Gabi, Vice!
- March 13: A Soldier's Heart, FPJ's Ang Probinsyano and Tonight with Boy Abunda
- March 14: ABS-CBN Regional (5 Saturday edition morning programs), Home Sweetie Home and I Can See Your Voice season 2
- March 15: Salamat Dok and The Voice Teens season 2
- March 17: Bandila
- March 20: Love Thy Woman and Sandugo
- April 3: iWant Original Series
- April 5: Banana Sundae
- April 8: Early Edition
- April 21: O Shopping
- April 29: #NoFilter
- April 30: Sports U
- May 1: Kabayan, Local Legends, Radyo Patrol Balita Alas-Siyete and The Tale of Nokdu
- May 2: Failon Ngayon, Honey, Watch Out!, Kuha Mo!, Maalaala Mo Kaya, Mission Possible, My Puhunan, Sine'skwela (rerun), S.O.C.O.: Scene of the Crime Operatives and The Bottomline with Boy Abunda
- May 3: Ang Hari: FPJ on ABS-CBN, Bayani (rerun), Hiraya Manawari (rerun), KB Family Weekend, MathDali (rerun), Matanglawin, Pilipinas Got Talent season 6 (rerun), Rated K, Swak na Swak, SpongeBob SquarePants, The Loud House, Sunday's Best, Wansapanataym (rerun) and Your Face Sounds Familiar Kids season 1 (rerun)
- May 4: May Bukas Pa (2009; rerun), On the Wings of Love (rerun), Story of Yanxi Palace, Tubig at Langis (rerun) and Wildflower (rerun)
- May 5: 100 Days to Heaven (rerun), ABS-CBN Regional (10 weekday morning programs and 12 TV Patrol regional newscasts), Garantisadong Balita, Got to Believe (rerun), Kapamilya Blockbusters, Kape't Pandasal, Love in Sadness, Meteor Garden (2018; rerun), The Legal Wife (rerun), Umagang Kay Ganda and Walang Hanggan (2012; rerun)

==== Stopped airing ====
===== COVID-19 pandemic =====
Program	Last airing	Resumed airing	Reason
Umagang Kay Ganda	March 17	May 4	Program temporary replaced by the DZMM TeleRadyo–simulcast programs due to the COVID-19 pandemic in the Philippines.
Bagong Morning Kapamilya (ABS-CBN TV-46 Pampanga, ABS-CBN TV-3 Baguio, ABS-CBN TV-7 Laoag and ABS-CBN TV-32 Dagupan)	March 17	May 4	Program temporary replaced by the DZMM TeleRadyo–simulcast programs due to the COVID-19 pandemic in the Philippines.
Marhay na Aga Kapamilya (ABS-CBN TV-4 Legazpi, Albay and ABS-CBN TV-11 Naga, Camarines Sur)	March 17	May 4	Program temporary replaced by the DZMM TeleRadyo–simulcast programs due to the COVID-19 pandemic in the Philippines.
Panay Sikat (ABS-CBN TV-10 Iloilo)	March 17	May 4	Program temporary replaced by the DZMM TeleRadyo–simulcast programs due to the COVID-19 pandemic in the Philippines.
The Morning Show (ABS-CBN TV-4 Bacolod)	March 17	May 4	Program temporary replaced by the DZMM TeleRadyo–simulcast programs due to the COVID-19 pandemic in the Philippines.
Maayong Buntag Kapamilya (ABS-CBN TV-3 Cebu)	March 17	May 4	Program temporary replaced by the DZMM TeleRadyo–simulcast programs due to the COVID-19 pandemic in the Philippines.
Pamahaw Espesyal (ABS-CBN TV-4 Cagayan de Oro and ABS-CBN TV-11 Butuan)	March 17	May 4	Program temporary replaced by the DZMM TeleRadyo–simulcast programs due to the COVID-19 pandemic in the Philippines.
Maayong Buntag Mindanao (ABS-CBN TV-4 Davao and ABS-CBN TV-3 Zamboanga)	March 17	May 4	Program temporary replaced by the DZMM TeleRadyo–simulcast programs due to the COVID-19 pandemic in the Philippines.
Buenos Días Zamboanga (ABS-CBN TV-3 Zamboanga)	March 17	May 4	Program temporary replaced by the DZMM TeleRadyo–simulcast programs due to the COVID-19 pandemic in the Philippines.
Magandang Umaga South Central Mindanao (ABS-CBN TV-3 General Santos and ABS-CBN TV-5 Cotabato)	March 17	May 4	Program temporary replaced by the DZMM TeleRadyo–simulcast programs due to the COVID-19 pandemic in the Philippines.
TV Patrol Palawan (ABS-CBN TV-7 Palawan)	March 25	April 20	Temporary suspension of telecast due to the COVID-19 pandemic in the Philippines.
TV Patrol Southern Mindanao (ABS-CBN TV-4 Davao)	March 25	April 20	Temporary suspension of telecast due to the COVID-19 pandemic in the Philippines.
TV Patrol Bicol (ABS-CBN TV-4 Legazpi, Albay and ABS-CBN TV-11 Naga, Camarines Sur)	March 26	March 30	Temporary suspension of telecast due to the COVID-19 pandemic in the Philippines.

===== Shutdown of ABS-CBN broadcasting =====
Program	Last airing	Resumed airing	Reason
Ipaglaban Mo!	May 2	June 14 (Kapamilya Channel); July 4, 2021 (A2Z); April 21, 2024 (All TV)	Temporary suspension of telecast due to shutdown of ABS-CBN.
The Healing Eucharist	May 3	June 14 (Kapamilya Channel); January 4, 2026 (All TV)	Temporary suspension of telecast due to shutdown of ABS-CBN.
G Diaries	May 3	June 14 (Kapamilya Channel); January 4, 2026 (All TV)	Temporary suspension of telecast due to shutdown of ABS-CBN.
ASAP XP	May 3	June 14 (Jeepney TV and Kapamilya Channel); October 11 (A2Z); January 24, 2021 – December 28, 2025; October 18, 2026 (TV5); January 4, 2026 (All TV)	Temporary suspension of telecast due to shutdown of ABS-CBN.
TV Patrol Weekend	May 3	May 7 (ANC); May 9 (Cine Mo!); August 1 (Kapamilya Channel); January 1, 2022 (A2Z); April 20, 2024 (All TV); June 1, 2024 (PRTV Prime Media)	Temporary suspension of telecast due to shutdown of ABS-CBN. Continued broadcast via ABS-CBN News Channel and DZMM TeleRadyo.
Kapamilya Daily Mass	May 5	June 13 (Kapamilya Channel); January 2, 2026 (All TV)	Temporary suspension of telecast due to shutdown of ABS-CBN.
Magandang Buhay	May 5	June 15, 2020 – June 29, 2026 (Kapamilya Channel); October 19, 2020 (A2Z); February 6, 2023 – March 1, 2024 (TV5); May 13, 2024 – June 29, 2026 (All TV)	Temporary suspension of telecast due to shutdown of ABS-CBN.
It's Showtime	May 5	June 13 (Kapamilya Channel); October 10 (A2Z); July 16, 2022 – June 30, 2023 (TV5); July 1, 2023 – December 31, 2024 (GTV); April 6, 2024 (GMA); June 17, 2024 (All TV)	Temporary suspension of telecast due to shutdown of ABS-CBN.
TV Patrol	May 5	May 8 (Cine Mo!); July 27 (Kapamilya Channel); January 3, 2022 (A2Z); April 15, 2024 (All TV); May 27, 2024 (PRTV Prime Media)	Temporary suspension of telecast due to shutdown of ABS-CBN. Continued broadcast via ABS-CBN News Channel on May 7 and TeleRadyo on May 8.

===== Cancelled =====
- March 25: TV Patrol North Luzon (ABS-CBN TV-46 Pampanga) (reason: Temporary suspension of telecast due to the COVID-19 pandemic in the Philippines and ABS-CBN franchise renewal controversy which led to end operations of TV Patrol regional shows)

==== A2Z ====
The following are programs that ended on A2Z:

- October 23: Zinema Presents (A2Z Zinema)
- November 1: A2Z News Alert
- November 29: Sunday Zine Hits (A2Z Zinema)
- December 9: Princess Sarah (Kidz Toon Time)
- December 11: Cedie, Ang Munting Prinsipe (Kidz Toon Time)

==== GMA ====
The following are programs that ended on GMA Network:

- January 5: Fairy Tail season 6
- January 17: Love Alert
- January 23: Wicked Angel
- January 24: Beautiful Justice
- January 25: Pororo, The Racing Adventure
- January 31: One of the Baes
- February 7: The Gift
- February 21: Madrasta
- February 22: Knock Out (rerun)
- February 29: One Piece Film: Z (rerun)
- March 5: Angel's Last Mission
- March 14: Kapuso Movie Night and Prima Donnas (Saturday edition)
- March 21: Dragon Ball Super (season 1)
- March 28: Justice League: War
- March 31: The Crown Princess (rerun)
- April 4: Ilaban Natin Yan! and Knockout: New Challenger (rerun)
- April 8: Melo del Prado sa Super Radyo DZBB, Saksi sa Dobol B and Super Balita sa Umaga Nationwide
- April 25: GMA Regional TV Weekend News
- May 1: Alyas Robin Hood season 1 (rerun)
- May 10: Knockout: Rising (rerun)
- May 15: Onanay (rerun)
- May 17: Sambuhay TV Mass
- May 30: Angry Birds Toons with Stella and Piggy Tales
- May 31: Sunday Night Box Office
- June 6: Kalyeserye (Eat Bulaga!; rerun) and Wowowin Primetime
- June 12: Strong Girl Bong-soon (rerun)
- June 25: The Last Empress
- June 29: Art Angel (rerun)
- July 4: Karelasyon (rerun)
- July 10: One Western Visayas (GMA Cebu)
- July 12: Jackie Chan Adventures (rerun)
- August 1: Maynila
- August 7: Secret Garden (rerun)
- August 8: My Golden Life (rerun)
- August 9: Taste Buddies
- August 14: Stairway to Heaven (2009; rerun)
- August 16: My Husband's Lover (rerun)
- August 29: Piggy Tales: 4th Street
- September 3: Misty
- September 20: Idol sa Kusina
- September 24: Meant to Be (rerun)
- September 26: Road Trip (3rd incarnation; rerun)
- October 3: Madam Pushy and I and Pepito Manaloto: Ang Tunay na Kwento
- October 6: Alamat (rerun)
- October 23: I Can See You (season 1)
- October 25: One Piece season 11
- November 1: Home Base Plus (season 21)
- November 19: Kambal, Karibal (rerun)
- November 26: My Love from Another Star
- November 29: Yo-Kai Watch (season 3; rerun)
- December 4: One True Love (rerun)
- December 12: Makulay ang Buhay (season 1)
- December 18: The Shannara Chronicles (season 2)
- December 19: Kaibigan: The Series
- December 20: The Clash (season 3)
- December 25: Descendants of the Sun
- December 27: TriPinas

===== Stopped airing =====
====== Miscellaneous ======
Program	Last airing	Resumed airing	Reason
Wish Ko Lang!	February 15	July 11	Program concluded and replaced by Ilaban Natin Yan! on February 22.
Tadhana	April 18	May 9	Season break.
Bleach (season 1; rerun)	May 3	September 27 (GMA News TV)	Program replaced by Fairy Tail (season 6).
Biyahe ni Drew	May 29	February 28, 2021	Program replaced by Saksi beginning June 1.
Front Row	July 13	January 4, 2021	Program replaced by Saksi beginning July 20. Moved to GMA News TV on the same day.
Alisto	July 14	January 5, 2021	Program replaced by Saksi beginning July 20. Moved to GMA News TV on July 21.
Tunay na Buhay	July 15	January 6, 2021	Program replaced by Saksi beginning July 20. Moved to GMA News TV on July 22.
Reporter's Notebook	July 16	January 7, 2021	Program replaced by Saksi beginning July 20. Moved to GMA News TV on July 23.
Flame of Recca (rerun)	October 31	November 8 (GMA News TV)	Program replaced by Ben 10: Ultimate Alien.
Dragon Ball Super (season 1; rerun)	November 20	January 11, 2021	Program pre-empted by Christmas Cartoon Festival Presents on November 23.
Angry Birds Blues	November 28	December 26	Programs replaced by Kaibigan: The Series on December 5.
Ben 10: Ultimate Alien	November 28	December 26	Programs replaced by Kaibigan: The Series on December 5.

====== COVID-19 pandemic ======
Program	Last airing	Resumed airing	Reason
Agripreneur	March 14	April 18	Temporary suspension of telecast due to the COVID-19 pandemic in the Philippines.
Kapwa Ko Mahal Ko	March 14	April 18	Temporary suspension of telecast due to the COVID-19 pandemic in the Philippines.
Yo-Kai Watch (season 3; rerun)	March 15	May 24	Temporary suspension of telecast and replaced by Sambuhay TV Mass beginning March 22 due to the COVID-19 pandemic in the Philippines.
In Touch with Dr. Charles Stanley	March 15	May 24	Temporary suspension of telecast due to the COVID-19 pandemic in the Philippines.
Magkaagaw	March 17	January 18, 2021; February 15, 2021 (new episodes)	Temporary suspension of tapings due to the COVID-19 pandemic in the Philippines.
Anak ni Waray vs. Anak ni Biday	March 17	January 18, 2021; February 8, 2021 (new episodes)	Temporary suspension of tapings due to the COVID-19 pandemic in the Philippines.
Prima Donnas (season 1)	March 18	August 17; November 9 (new episodes)	Temporary suspension of tapings due to the COVID-19 pandemic in the Philippines.
Descendants of the Sun	March 18	October 26; November 5 (new episodes)	Temporary suspension of tapings due to the COVID-19 pandemic in the Philippines.
Love of My Life	March 20	December 28; January 18, 2021 (new episodes)	Temporary suspension of tapings due to the COVID-19 pandemic in the Philippines.
Unang Hirit	March 20	April 13	Temporarily replaced by Dobol B sa GMA programming block due to the COVID-19 pandemic in the Philippines.
All-Out Sundays	March 22	July 12	Temporary suspension of tapings due to the COVID-19 pandemic in the Philippines. Continued broadcast through online via its own Facebook and YouTube (GMA Network) as All-Out Sundays: The Stay Home Party.
Centerstage	March 22	February 7, 2021	Temporary suspension of tapings due to the COVID-19 pandemic in the Philippines.
Bilangin ang Bituin sa Langit	March 23	December 7 January 5, 2021 (new episodes)	Temporary suspension of tapings due to the COVID-19 pandemic in the Philippines.
Saksi	March 27	June 1	Temporary suspension of telecast and the extension of 24 Oras to 2 hours due to the COVID-19 pandemic in the Philippines.
Maynila	April 4	June 27	Program temporary replaced by Pokémon the Series: XYZ (rerun) and Mako Mermaids (rerun) due to the COVID-19 pandemic in the Philippines.
Pokémon the Series: XYZ (rerun)	June 20	September 27 (GMA News TV)	Program replaced by the returning Maynila on June 27.
Mako Mermaids (season 2; rerun)	June 20	April 19, 2021	Program replaced by the returning Maynila on June 27.
Balitang Bisdak (GMA Cebu)	June 26	July 13	Temporary suspension of broadcast due to the enhanced community quarantine in Cebu City.
GMA Regional TV Live! (GMA Cebu)	June 26	July 13	Temporary suspension of broadcast due to the enhanced community quarantine in Cebu City.

==== TV5 ====
The following are programs that ended on TV5:

- January 3: Henry Hugglemonster (rerun)
- January 5: SportsCenter Philippines and SportsCenter Right Now
- January 8: Cassandra: Warrior Angel (rerun)
- January 10: Star Confessions (rerun)
- January 11: Turbo Time
- January 24: Enchanted Garden (rerun) and Obsession (rerun)
- February 21: Misibis Bay (rerun)
- February 28: Isang Dakot Na Luha (rerun) and Undercover (rerun)
- February 29: Ang Utol Kong Hoodlum (rerun), For Love or Money (rerun), History with Lourd (rerun), One of the Boys (rerun), Ride PH, Sabado Night Specials and Third Eye (rerun)
- March 1: BBC My World, Pinoy Samurai (rerun) and Sunday Film Festivals
- March 13: Tangled: The Series
- March 15: Fight Feat Presents
- March 16: Agenda with Cito Beltran, Aksyon, Aksyon Alerts, Aksyon sa Tanghali, Morning Calls and Wag Po!
- April 4: No Harm, No Foul (rerun)
- April 7: Positive (rerun)
- April 8: Felina: Prinsesa ng mga Pusa (rerun) and Mga Nagbabagang Bulaklak (rerun)
- April 12: Kaya (rerun)
- April 24: The Avengers: Earth's Mightiest Heroes and Ultimate Spider-Man (rerun)
- April 25: Avengers Assemble (rerun)
- April 27: Isang Dakot na Luha (rerun)
- April 28: Ang Utol Kong Hoodlum (rerun)
- April 30: Kapitan Awesome (rerun)
- May 2: Untold Stories Mula sa Face to Face (rerun)
- May 3: Kakaibang Lunas and The Chasedown
- May 8: Gelicious (rerun) and Misibis Bay (rerun)
- May 15: My Driver Sweet Lover (rerun)
- May 22: Doc McStuffins: Toy Hospital
- May 27: Cassandra: Warrior Angel (rerun)
- June 5: Enchanted Garden (rerun), History with Lourd (rerun), Kidlat (rerun) and Randy Cunningham: 9th Grade Ninja (rerun)
- June 6: Jasmine (rerun)
- June 10: Babaeng Hampaslupa (rerun)
- June 19: Hi-5 Philippines (rerun) and Mickey and the Roadster Racers (rerun)
- June 20: Knightfall (season 1)
- June 26: Lolabasyang.com (rerun)
- July 1: #ParangNormal Activity (rerun)
- July 3: Bakit Manipis ang Ulap? (rerun)
- July 10: Glamorosa (rerun)
- July 14: Ang Panday (2016; rerun)
- July 17: Istorifik: Pidol Kuwentong Fantastik (rerun), Jake and the Never Land Pirates (rerun), Kick Buttowski: Suburban Daredevil (rerun), Lokomoko (Happy Naman D'yan!; rerun), Lokomoko U (Happy Naman D'yan!; rerun), Madam Chairman (rerun), Midnight DJ (rerun), Motorcity (rerun), Sa Ngalan ng Ina (rerun), Sportpage, The Best of Face to Face (rerun), The Chiefs, Tropa Mo Ko Unli (Happy Naman D'yan!; rerun), Valiente (2012; rerun) and Wow Mali Pa Rin! (Happy Naman D'yan!; rerun)
- July 18: Barrio Kulimlim (rerun), Celebrity Samurai (rerun), God's Code, Hapi-House (rerun), Kano Luvs Pinay (rerun), Mac and Chiz (rerun), Manila Cathedral Daily Mass, One of the Boys (rerun), Pinoy Explorer (rerun), Star Confessions (rerun), The Mysterious Case of Bea Montenegro, The Wives of House No. 2 (rerun) and TV5 Love Stories (rerun)
- July 19: CCF Afternoon Worship Service, From Helen's Kitchen, Hour Glass (rerun), Primetime Megahits, Sine Spectacular and Taddy Taddy Po (rerun)
- July 25: Thunderbird Sabong Nation
- July 26: Bakbakan Na, Tukaan and UFC Fight Night
- July 31: EZ Shop
- August 8: Kalye Wars (rerun)
- August 9: Tabi Po (rerun)
- August 10: DC's Legends of Tomorrow season 1
- August 14: MX3 Infomercials
- August 19: Gotham season 1
- August 30: Feels Like Forever and The Orbiters
- September 2: DC's Legends of Tomorrow season 2
- September 12: Ang Kwarto Sa May Hagdanan (rerun)
- September 25: From the Beautiful Country
- October 2: Batibot (rerun), CCF Daily and One Balita Pilipinas (primetime edition)
- October 4: One News Now and One Screen Presents
- October 9: Furious Fire and Gotham season 2
- October 10: Alagang Kapatid
- October 11: WWE Raw
- October 16: One Balita Pilipinas (noontime edition)
- October 18: Jumpball and The Huddle
- November 1: Fit for Life
- December 6: Dance Moms and PBA 3-Point Shootout Virtual Charity Tournament
- December 11: Wok of Love
- December 12: NBA Spotlight and NBA Hype
- December 19: Pidol's Wonderland (rerun)
- December 26: Masked Singer Pilipinas season 1
- December 30: Bella Bandida
- December 31: Carpool

===== Stopped airing =====
====== Miscellaneous ======
Program	Last airing	Resumed airing	Reason
One Balita Pilipinas	February 28	May 7	Program replaced by Babaeng Hampaslupa (rerun) beginning March 2.
Felina: Prinsesa ng mga Pusa (rerun)	February 28	March 17	Program replaced by My Driver Sweet Lover (rerun) beginning March 2.
#ParangNormal Activity (rerun)	February 29	April 18	Series break.
My Driver Sweet Lover (rerun)	March 27	April 13	Series break.
Celebrity Samurai (rerun)	April 4	May 9	Series break.
Kano Luvs Pinay (rerun)	April 4	May 9	Series break.
Mac and Chiz (rerun)	April 4	May 9	Series break.
Wattpad Presents (rerun)	April 4	May 28	Series break.
Sa Ngalan ng Ina (rerun)	April 6	June 11	Program replaced by Isang Dakot na Luha (rerun) beginning April 13.
Babaeng Hampaslupa (rerun)	April 8	May 4	Program replaced by Enchanted Garden (rerun), Kidlat (rerun) and Misibis Bay (rerun) beginning April 13.
Jumpball	May 3	June 26	Program on break
Pidol's Wonderland (rerun)	July 3	July 20	Idol in Action expanded to 90 minutes beginning July 6.
Breaking the Magician's Code	October 24	December 13	Series break.

====== COVID-19 pandemic ======
Program	Last airing	Resumed airing	Reason
Sine Spectacular	March 6	May 10	Temporary suspension of telecast due to the COVID-19 pandemic in the Philippines
Sambuhay TV Mass	March 8	March 22 (GMA)	Temporary suspension of telecast due to the COVID-19 pandemic in the Philippines
The Chiefs	March 15	May 7	Temporary suspension of telecast and replaced by Sunday TV Mass due to the COVID-19 pandemic in the Philippines
One Balita	March 16	June 1 (as One Balita Pilipinas)	Temporary suspension of broadcast and replaced by One News Now and live special coverage due to the COVID-19 pandemic in the Philippines.
EZ Shop	March 21	June 22	Temporary suspension of telecast due to the COVID-19 pandemic in the Philippines.
Idol in Action	August 25	September 3	Temporary suspension of broadcast and replaced with re-runs due to the massive disinfection of TV5 Media Center after an employee tested positive for COVID-19. It was supposed to resume on September 2, but was delayed to September 3 due to technical difficulties. The program resumed broadcast on September 3.

===== Cancelled =====
- August 9: Healing Galing sa TV (reason: Program replaced by Fit for Life and moved to UNTV on December 5 as Healing Galing Live!.)
- September 9: Love Life with Kris (reason: Unknown. Show was not yet debut on the said network.)

=== State-owned networks ===
==== PTV ====
The following are programs that ended on People's Television Network:

- January 4: Lutong-Luto with CJ Hirro
- March 13: Bagong Pilipinas Afternoon Edition and DOSTv: Science for the People
- March 14: Soldier of Christ
- March 16: PTV Newsbreak (2nd incarnation)
- July 31: Bagong Pilipinas, Daily Info and PTV News Headlines
- September 4: PTV News (3rd incarnation)
- September 6: Ulat Bayan (Weekend edition)

===== Stopped airing =====
====== Miscellaneous ======
Program	Last airing	Resumed airing	Reason
PTV Sports (2nd incarnation)	October 2	October 19	Program replaced by Tutok PDEA, Kontra Droga beginning October 5.

====== COVID-19 pandemic ======
Program	Last airing	Resumed airing	Reason
PCSO Lottery Draw	March 17	August 7	Temporary suspension of all PCSO lottery games due to the implementation of enhanced community quarantine in Luzon during the COVID-19 pandemic in the Philippines and was replaced by #LagingHanda press briefing by PCOO at 11 a.m., DOH Press Briefing at 4 p.m. and the expanded PTV News Headlines at 9 p.m.
PNA Newsroom	July 30	August 10	Temporary suspension of telecast on July 30 due to the disinfection of the PNA Headquarters.
Sentro Balita	July 31	September 7	Temporary suspension of telecast due to the network's reduced manpower policies.
Public Briefing: #LagingHandaPH	August 1	August 26	Temporary suspension of telecast due to the reductions affecting live programming and the network's reduced manpower policies as the six employees of the network tests positive for COVID-19.

==== IBC ====
The following are programs that ended on IBC:

- January 11: ATC E-Sports Highlights
- January 29: Arnelli in da Haus
- March 1: Misa Tradionalis Latin Mass and Catechism
- March 19: Cooltura (revived version)
- March 20: Cooltura (2011 original version; rerun)
- March 21: ASK TV: Artihan, Sayawan at Kantahan and Tilaok TV
- May 15: PTV News (3rd incarnation) (simulcast via People's Television Network)
- June 14: El Shaddai
- July 31: Sentro Balita (simulcast via People's Television Network)
- October 3: Public Briefing: #LagingHandaPH

===== Stopped airing =====
====== Miscellaneous ======
Program	Last airing	Resumed airing	Reason
DepEd TV	August 14 (end of first test run)	September 21 (second test run)	Temporary suspension of telecast due to the postponement of opening of regular classes in public schools to October 5.
DepEd TV	September 25 (end of second test run)	October 5 (full transmission)	Temporary suspension of telecast following the conclusion of the week-long second test run.

====== COVID-19 pandemic ======
Program	Last airing	Resumed airing	Reason
EZ Shop	March 18	May 2	Temporary suspension of telecast due to the COVID-19 pandemic in the Philippines.
TV Shop Philippines	March 18	May 16 (RJ DigiTV)	Temporary suspension of telecast due to the COVID-19 pandemic in the Philippines.
Chinese News TV (CNTV)	March 20	April 12, 2021 (ABS-CBN News Channel; as Chinatown News TV)	Temporary suspension of telecast due to the COVID-19 pandemic in the Philippines.
Talents Academy	March 21	June 12, 2023	Temporary suspension of telecast due to the COVID-19 pandemic in the Philippines.
Tutok 13	April 30	May 18	Temporary suspension of telecast due to the COVID-19 pandemic in the Philippines.
PNA Newsroom	July 30	August 10	Temporary suspension of telecast due to the COVID-19 pandemic in the Philippines.
Public Briefing: #LagingHandaPH	August 1	August 26	Temporary suspension of telecast due to the COVID-19 pandemic in the Philippines.

=== Minor networks ===
- March 13: Make My Day with Larry Henares and Pondahan ni Kuya Daniel on UNTV
- September 11: Agila Balita on Net 25

=== Other channels ===
- January 3: The Three Sides of Ana and Unforgivable on Telenovela Channel
- January 3: Doraemon (2005) on Yey!
- January 5: Little Big Shots on Jeepney TV
- January 5: Power Rangers Ninja Steel on Yey!
- January 10: Ikaw ay Pag-Ibig (rerun) on Jeepney TV
- January 11: Starla on Yey!
- January 17: Into the World Again and Pinoy Meets World (rerun) on GMA News TV
- January 18: Eucharistia: Pananalangin at Pag-aaral on GMA News TV
- January 24: Gangnam Beauty on Asianovela Channel
- January 24: Aliados (rerun) and Inday Will Always Love You on GMA News TV
- January 26: I Heart PH (season 3) on CNN Philippines
- January 26: The Better Half (rerun) on Jeepney TV
- January 31: Live Up to Your Name on Asianovela Channel
- January 31: Eva Fonda (rerun) and Sana Bukas pa ang Kahapon (rerun) on Jeepney TV
- February 7: Encounter on Asianovela Channel
- February 7: Dugong Buhay (rerun), Precious Hearts Romances Presents: Pintada and The Singing Bee (rerun) on Jeepney TV
- February 7: The Garfield Show on Yey!
- February 8: Healthy Sabado and Ito Ang Radyo Patrol on DZMM TeleRadyo
- February 9: Radyo Patrol Balita Alas-Dose Weekend on DZMM TeleRadyo
- February 10: Born to Be Wild on GMA News TV
- February 11: Front Row on GMA News TV
- February 12: Reporter's Notebook on GMA News TV
- February 13: Aha! on GMA News TV
- February 14: Niño on Fox Filipino (now defunct)
- February 14: Precious Hearts Romances Presents: Somewhere in My Heart on Jeepney TV
- February 14: Alisto on GMA News TV
- February 15: Nasaan Ka Nang Kailangan Kita on Jeepney TV
- February 16: Campus Romance, Kababakaba and Karelasyon (rerun) on GMA News TV
- February 17: Sierra Canyon High School Basketball on 5 Plus (now One Sports)
- February 21: Hit the Top on GMA News TV
- February 21: Oh My G! on Jeepney TV
- February 21: Ace of Diamond season 1 (rerun) and Boruto: Naruto Next Generations (season 1) on Yey!
- February 24: Elementary (season 6) on Jack TV (now defunct)
- February 26: It Might Be You (rerun) on Jeepney TV
- February 28: Meteor Garden (2018) on Asianovela Channel
- February 28: Rakshasa Street on GMA News TV
- February 28: Walang Hanggan (2012; rerun) on Jeepney TV
- February 29: Ride PH on One News
- March 1: Jamie & Jimmy's Food Fight Club (season 4) on ETC
- March 1: BBC My World on One News
- March 6: Something in the Rain (rerun) on Asianovela Channel
- March 6: Pati Ba Pintig ng Puso on Fox Filipino (now defunct)
- March 6: Muling Buksan ang Puso (rerun) on Jeepney TV
- March 6: One-Punch Man season 1 (rerun) and Yu-Gi-Oh! 5D's season 1 (rerun) on Yey!
- March 7: Around the Horn, eGG Network High Noon, Pardon the Interruption and World of X Games on 5 Plus (now One Sports)
- March 7: Turo-Turo on DZMM TeleRadyo
- March 12: Sports U on DZMM TeleRadyo
- March 13: Business Nightly, Early Edition, Gametime and Square Off on ANC
- March 13: Cheongdam-dong Scandal and Two Cops (rerun) on Asianovela Channel
- March 13: Busina Balita and Business Roundup on CNN Philippines
- March 13: DZRH Showbiz Spotted on DZRH News Television
- March 13: Angelito: Ang Bagong Yugto (rerun), Goin' Bulilit Classics, Inday Bote, Precious Hearts Romances Presents: My Cheating Heart and Prinsesa ng Banyera on Jeepney TV
- March 13: Digimon Tamers (rerun) on Yey!
- March 14: Now Showing on GMA News TV
- March 14: Tech Sabado and Showbiz FM on One PH
- March 15: Salamat Dok and Sports U on ANC
- March 15: FPJ's Ang Probinsyano: Action Marathon on Cine Mo!
- March 15: Just Fur Babies, Newsroom Junior Edition and Thank God It's The Weekend on CNN Philippines
- March 15: Chismax: Chismis to the Max, Headline Pilipinas (Sunday edition), Pinoy Vibes, Pintig Balita, Private Nights, Radyo Patrol Balita Alas-Kwatro Weekend, Remember When, Salitang Buhay and Sa Kabukiran on DZMM TeleRadyo
- March 15: Newsroom Junior Edition on CNN Philippines
- March 15: Ireklamo kay Greco, Mag-Usap Tayo and Tambayan Sessions on DZRH News Television
- March 15: #MichaelAngelo Show, Balitanghali Weekend, Dear Friend, Taste MNL, and The World of Gandang Ricky Reyes on GMA News TV
- March 15: Aksyon Sports, Balita Alas-Singko and Iba 'Yung Pinoy on One PH
- March 15: Play in Work on One Sports
- March 15: Friends Again on S+A
- March 16: Aksyon and Morning Calls on One PH
- March 17: Tadhana on GMA News TV
- March 18: MMK Klasik and Usapang de Campanila on DZMM TeleRadyo
- March 18: 100% Pinoy! (rerun), EZ Shop, My Sassy Girl and Sino? (Dobol B sa News TV) on GMA News TV
- March 19: Moonlight Serenade on DZMM TeleRadyo
- March 20: All of Me (rerun) and Pieta (rerun) on Jeepney TV
- March 21: Fast Break, OMJ! and S.O.C.O. sa DZMM on DZMM TeleRadyo
- March 21: Flirty Dancing (season 1) on ETC
- March 21: The Greatest Love (rerun) on Jeepney TV
- March 27: Labor of Love on ANC and DZMM TeleRadyo
- March 27: 100 Days My Prince and Touch Your Heart on Asianovela Channel
- March 27: The Blood Sisters on Jeepney TV
- March 27: Marcelino Pan y Vino (rerun) on Yey!
- March 29: Penn & Teller: Fool Us (season 5) on Jack TV (now defunct)
- March 29: Sunday TV Mass on One Sports
- March 31: Jack's HandPicked, Jack TV's Playlist and TMZ on TV on Jack TV (now defunct)
- April 3: My Faithful Husband on Fox Filipino (now defunct)
- April 3: Katorse (rerun) and Pangako sa 'Yo (2015) on Jeepney TV
- April 3: Shimmer and Shine on Yey!
- April 4: Mission Possible and My Puhunan on DZMM TeleRadyo
- April 5: Beyblade Burst and Max Steel (season 1; rerun) on Yey!
- April 10: Goblin on Asianovela Channel
- April 12: I Can Do That on Jeepney TV
- April 14: Ipaglaban Mo! on DZMM TeleRadyo
- April 16: Early Edition, Headstart, Market Edge and Matters of Fact on DZMM TeleRadyo and S+A
- April 17: Dos por Dos, Failon Ngayon sa DZMM, Garantisadong Balita, Headline Pilipinas, Kabayan, Lingkod Kapamilya sa DZMM, On the Spot, Pasada Sais Trenta and SRO: Suhestyon, Reaksyon at Opinyon on ANC
- April 17: Mother (rerun) on Asianovela Channel
- April 17: May Isang Pangarap and Nang Ngumiti ang Langit on Jeepney TV
- April 18: Good Job, Headline Pilipinas Weekend (Saturday edition), Konsyumer Atbp., Kuwentuhang Lokal, Magandang Morning with Julius and Zen, Radyo Negosyo, Tandem: Lima at Logan and Usapang Kalye on ANC
- April 19: ANC Rundown, Dateline Philippines, Top Story and The World Tonight on DZMM TeleRadyo
- April 20: Rated K on DZMM TeleRadyo
- April 24: Tomorrow, With You (rerun) on Asianovela Channel
- April 25: Project Destination on GMA News TV
- April 28: Legacies (season 2) on ETC
- April 29: S.O.C.O.: Scene of the Crime Operatives on DZMM TeleRadyo
- May 1: A Love So Beautiful (rerun) on Asianovela Channel
- May 1: Kuha Mo! on DZMM TeleRadyo
- May 1: The Ellen DeGeneres Show season 17 and TMZ on TV on ETC
- May 1: Inazuma Eleven GO: Chrono Stone (rerun) on Yey!
- May 2: Good Job, Headline Pilipinas Weekend (Saturday edition), Kape at Salita, Konsyumer Atbp., Kuwentuhang Lokal, Light Moments, Omaga-Diaz Report, Radyo Negosyo, Tandem: Lima at Logan and Usapang Kalye on DZMM TeleRadyo
- May 2: RX Plus: Health, Lifestyle and Leisure on S+A
- May 3: Dra. Bles @ Ur Serbis, Kapamilya Konek, Magandang Morning, Radyo Patrol Balita Alas-Siyete Weekend, Red Alert sa DZMM, Rosary Hour, Sagot Ko 'Yan!, Tulong Ko, Pasa Mo, TV Patrol Weekend and Yesterday on DZMM TeleRadyo
- May 3: Sports U on S+A
- May 4: Dr. Love Radio Show on DZMM TeleRadyo
- May 5: Go Back Couple (rerun) on Asianovela Channel
- May 5: DZMM Balita Ngayon, DZMM Special Coverage, Dos por Dos, Failon Ngayon sa DZMM, Garantisadong Balita, Headline Pilipinas, Kabayan, Kapamilya Daily Mass, Lingkod Kapamilya sa DZMM, Pasada Sais Trenta, Public Briefing: #LagingHandaPH, Radyo Patrol Balita Alas-Siyete, SRO: Suhestyon, Reaksyon at Opinyon and TV Patrol on DZMM TeleRadyo
- May 5: NCIS: Los Angeles season 9 on Movie Central
- May 5: Kapamilya Daily Mass and O Shopping on S+A
- May 8: The Promise of Forever on Jeepney TV
- May 9: Public Briefing: #LagingHandaPH on GMA News TV
- May 9: Ngayon at Kailanman (2018) on Jeepney TV
- May 11: Planet Earth II on GMA News TV
- May 12: Politics as Usual on CNN Philippines
- May 14: On The Record on CNN Philippines
- May 14: Survivor: Winners at War on Solar Sports
- May 15: Oddbods (season 2) on Yey!
- May 22: Passion and Power on Telenovela Channel
- May 22: Digimon Frontier (rerun) on Yey!
- May 25: Toda Max (rerun) on Jeepney TV
- May 26: John En Shirley (rerun) on Jeepney TV
- May 27: Oki Doki Doc (rerun) on Jeepney TV
- May 28: George and Cecil (rerun) on Jeepney TV
- May 29: Public Briefing: #LagingHandaPH on ANC
- May 29: Klasmeyts (rerun) and Precious Hearts Romances Presents: Quikilig! on Jeepney TV
- May 31: Till I Met You (rerun) on Jeepney TV
- June 2: Man X Man on GMA News TV
- June 5: Public Briefing: #LagingHandaPH on CNN Philippines
- June 9: Public Briefing: #LagingHandaPH on TeleRadyo
- June 12: Princess Sarah (rerun) and Remi, Nobody's Girl (rerun) and Yu-Gi-Oh! Zexal season 1 (rerun) on Yey!
- June 12: News Patrol on TeleRadyo
- June 17: Rated K on TeleRadyo
- June 19: Princess and I (rerun) on Jeepney TV
- June 26: Legal Minds on DZRH News Television
- June 26: Playhouse on Jeepney TV
- June 26: Inazuma Eleven GO: Galaxy (rerun) on Yey!
- June 28: AC Weekend Cinema on Asianovela Channel
- June 28: Sa Puso Ko, Iingatan Ka on Jeepney TV
- June 28: Avatar: The Legend of Aang (rerun), Goin' Bulilit, Kung Fu Panda: Legends of Awesomeness (rerun), Monk the Little Dog, My Hero Academia season 2 (rerun), Ninjago: Masters of Spinjitzu (seasons 1 and 2), Power Rangers: Dino Charge (rerun), Super Inggo and The Fairly OddParents on Yey!
- June 30: Asian Weekday Movie Fest, Black (rerun), Meteor Garden (2001; rerun), W (rerun) and What's Wrong with Secretary Kim (rerun) on Asianovela Channel
- July 1: Digimon Xros Wars (rerun), Dora the Explorer (rerun), Judy Abbott (rerun), Naruto (rerun), Peter Pan and Wendy (rerun), Rusty Rivets, Samurai X (rerun), SpongeBob SquarePants, The Adventures of Jimmy Neutron, Boy Genius (rerun) and The Loud House on Yey!
- July 3: Ika-6 na Utos on Fox Filipino (now defunct)
- July 4: W on Kapamilya Channel
- July 5: Super Sine on Fox Filipino (now defunct)
- July 6: Kuha Mo! on Jeepney TV
- July 7: Mission Possible, My Puhunan and Sports U on Jeepney TV
- July 8: Local Legends, Matanglawin and Rated K on Jeepney TV
- July 9: #NoFilter on Jeepney TV
- July 10: Failon Ngayon and Tatak Pilipino (rerun) on Jeepney TV
- July 13: Extreme Animal Babies on GMA News TV
- July 14: Bawal ang Pasaway kay Mareng Winnie on GMA News TV
- July 15: Madam Secretary (season 6) on ETC
- July 15: Tonight with Arnold Clavio on GMA News TV
- July 16: Investigative Documentaries on GMA News TV
- July 17: Reel Time on GMA News TV
- July 19: KB Family Weekend Rewind on Kapamilya Channel
- July 24: TV Patrol on Cine Mo!
- July 24: Banana Sundae and I Can See Your Voice season 1 on Kapamilya Channel
- July 24: Kano Luvs Pinay and Riverdale season 1 on One Screen
- July 25: Kuha Mo! on Kapamilya Channel
- July 26: TV Patrol Weekend on Cine Mo!
- July 31: You're My Destiny on Heart of Asia
- July 31: Marina (rerun) on Jeepney TV
- July 31: Dos Por Dos, Garantisadong Balita and Kuha Mo! on TeleRadyo
- August 7: Starry Night, Starry Sea on Heart of Asia
- August 8: The King is in Love on Kapamilya Channel
- August 9: Gordon Ramsay's 24 Hours to Hell and Back (season 1) on ETC
- August 14: Hidden Love on GMA News TV
- August 14: Love in Trouble and Sky Castle on Heart of Asia
- August 14: 2gether: The Series, Familiar Wife and The World of a Married Couple on Kapamilya Channel
- August 16: Celebrity Playtime (rerun) on Jeepney TV
- August 16: The Voice Teens season 2 on Kapamilya Channel
- August 21: Price of Passion on GMA News TV
- August 22: Magpayo Nga Kayo and Tandem: Lima at Logan on TeleRadyo
- August 23: Dra. Bles @ Ur Serbis, Magandang Morning, Radyo Patrol Balita Alas-Siyete Weekend and Red Alert sa TeleRadyo on TeleRadyo
- August 28: DZRH Evening News, DZRH Network News and Happy Hour on DZRH News Television
- August 28: Pinoy Myx Breakout on Myx
- August 28: Good Vibes, S.O.C.O.: Scene of the Crime Operatives and Todo-Todo Walang Preno on TeleRadyo
- August 28: The Neighbor on Telenovela Channel
- August 29: Light Moments on TeleRadyo
- August 30: Panalangin sa Alas-Tres ng Hapon on TeleRadyo
- August 30: My Myx on Myx
- August 31: Failon Ngayon sa TeleRadyo on TeleRadyo
- September 4: Annaliza (2013; rerun) and Got to Believe (rerun) on Jeepney TV
- September 5: Halik on Jeepney TV
- September 5: Epol/Apple and Sine'skwela on Kapamilya Channel
- September 8: Radyo Patrol Balita Alas-Siyete on Kapamilya Channel and TeleRadyo
- September 11: Entertainment Tonight on ETC
- September 11: Nakee and Street Fighter: Assassin's Fist on GMA News TV
- September 11: On the Wings of Love (rerun) on Jeepney TV
- September 11: Love Thy Woman on Kapamilya Channel
- September 12: Still 2gether on Kapamilya Channel
- September 14: Zoey's Extraordinary Playlist (season 1) on ETC
- September 14: Garlic on One Screen
- September 18: SOS: Serbisyo on the Spot and Super Balita sa Tanghali Nationwide on GMA News TV (Dobol B sa News TV)
- September 18: Dong Yi and Whisper on Heart of Asia
- September 18: Precious Hearts Romances Presents: Bud Brothers (rerun) and Tubig at Langis (rerun) on Jeepney TV
- September 18: A Soldier's Heart and TeleBalita on Kapamilya Channel
- September 18: DC's Legends of Tomorrow season 1 and LolaBasyang.com on One Screen
- September 18: TeleBalita on TeleRadyo
- September 19: Radyo Negosyo on TeleRadyo
- September 20: Boses ng Balita, Dobol B, Bantay Balita: Bantay sa Kamara, Liwanag sa Balita, MMDA sa GMA and TKO: Talakayan Komentaryo't Opinyon on GMA News TV (Dobol B sa News TV)
- September 20: TeleBalita Weekend on TeleRadyo
- September 25: Anong Say N'yo? (Dobol B sa News TV) on GMA News TV
- September 25: The Good Manager and Waves of Life on Heart of Asia
- September 25: Precious Hearts Romances Presents: Los Bastardos on Jeepney TV
- September 25: Hinahanap-Hanap Kita on Kapamilya Channel
- September 26: Francis "Kiko" Flores on Board, Super Balita sa Hapon Weekend and Super Balita sa Tanghali Weekend on GMA News TV (Dobol B sa News TV)
- September 26: Good Vibes with Edu on Jeepney TV
- October 2: BolJak, Early All Ready, Relasyon and Usapang Kapa-ted on One PH
- October 2: Majika on One Screen
- October 3: DZBB Super Serbisyo: Buhay, Trabaho at Negosyo on GMA News TV (Dobol B sa News TV)
- October 3: FlordeLiza (rerun) on Jeepney TV
- October 3: Konsyumer Atbp. on TeleRadyo
- October 4: Chink Positive on One PH
- October 5: The Orbiters on One Screen
- October 9: Magpahanggang Wakas (rerun) on Jeepney TV
- October 9: Code Name: Terrius and Weightlifting Fairy on Kapamilya Channel
- October 9: Marimar (1994) on One Screen
- October 10: Super Radyo Nationwide on GMA News TV (Dobol B sa News TV)
- October 11: Dobol B, Bantay Balita: Bantay sa Senado on GMA News TV (Dobol B sa News TV)
- October 11: You're My Home (rerun) on Jeepney TV
- October 16: Yagit (2014) on One Screen
- October 16: Anything But Plain on Telenovela Channel
- October 17: Goin' Bulilit and S.O.C.O.: Scene of the Crime Operatives on Kapamilya Channel
- October 18: Aladdin: You Would've Heard the Name and Cata on GMA News TV
- October 23: Princess Hours (2017) on Heart of Asia
- October 23: Shadows of the Past on Telenovela Channel
- October 24: Wansapanataym Presents on Jeepney TV
- October 25: The Kids' Choice (rerun) on Jeepney TV
- October 26: Feels Like Forever on One Screen
- October 30: Stand for Truth on GMA News TV
- October 30: Fighter of Destiny, Ikaw Lang ang Mamahalin (2011), Legacy, Queen of Mystery and The Big One on Heart of Asia
- October 30: Black and Pinoy Big Brother: Balikbahay Edition on Kapamilya Channel
- October 30: Along Came Love on Telenovela Channel
- October 31: O Shopping on Jeepney TV and Kapamilya Channel
- October 31: Spartan Race: Ultimate Team Challenge (season 2) on Solar Sports
- November 2: Fit for Life on Colours
- November 2: Newsmakers (New Normal: The Survival Guide) on GMA News TV
- November 3: Bright Side (New Normal: The Survival Guide) on GMA News TV
- November 5: Home Work (New Normal: The Survival Guide) on GMA News TV
- November 6: Bigtime Balita (Dobol B sa News TV), Family Time (New Normal: The Survival Guide), My Absolute Boyfriend and Super Balita sa Hapon (Dobol B sa News TV) on GMA News TV
- November 6: Agua Bendita (rerun), Huwag Ka Lang Mawawala (rerun) and Wildflower (rerun) on Jeepney TV
- November 6: Ang Lihim ni Annasandra on One Screen
- November 8: Ugly Duckling on GMA News TV
- November 13: Wok of Love on One Screen
- November 14: Turbo Zone on GMA News TV
- November 14: Starla on Jeepney TV
- November 16: Agham, Inc. on One Screen
- November 18: Kidlat on One Screen
- November 20: Oh My Ghost on GMA News TV
- November 20: Third Eye on One Screen
- November 22: Pinoy Movie Break on GMA News TV
- November 27: Wicked Angel on Heart of Asia
- November 27: I am Not a Robot on Kapamilya Channel
- November 27: Las Amazonas (rerun) on Telenovela Channel
- November 29: Starla on Kapamilya Channel
- November 29: Healing Galing sa Radyo5 on One PH
- December 4: Legend of Fuyao, Music Bank (Hallypop Strip) and Running Man (Hallypop Strip) on GMA News TV
- December 4: Hit the Top on Heart of Asia
- December 4: 100 Days to Heaven (rerun) on Jeepney TV
- December 4: Betty en NY on One Screen
- December 7: Dama on One Screen
- December 11: Woman of Dignity on Heart of Asia
- December 11: Langit Lupa (rerun) on Jeepney TV
- December 11: Love in Sadness on Kapamilya Channel
- December 18: Extraordinary You on GMA News TV
- December 18: The Best of MMK on Jeepney TV
- December 25: Marrying My Daughter Twice and The Fox Fairy on Heart of Asia
- December 26: Oplan Asenso on One PH
- December 26: Activating Sports, Balita Rewind, Gabay ng Pamilyang Marino, Health TV Embassy, KKK, Kuwentuhan Pa More, Level Up, The Skin and Scalp Talk by Dermclinic and Warrior Angel on Inquirer 990 Television
- December 27: Secret Seven on GMA News TV
- December 27: Yesterday on TeleRadyo
- December 27: Cockpihan: Usapang Sabong, Inquirer Nation, Isyu ng Bayan, Kakaiba Ka, Langit sa Lupa, Pera at Kabuhayan, Petiks Petiks Lang, Shoptalk U Shop and Tinig ng Marino on Inquirer 990 Television
- December 28: Front Row (Power Block) on GMA News TV
- December 28: MTRCB Uncut on Inquirer 990 Television
- December 29: Alisto (Power Block) on GMA News TV
- December 29: Everyday Goodwill and INQ&A on Inquirer 990 Television
- December 30: Tunay na Buhay (Power Block) on GMA News TV
- December 30: Buti na lang may SSS, Let’s Talk, Magusap Tayo and Showbiz Live on Inquirer 990 Television
- December 31: Dobol A sa Dobol B (Dobol B sa News TV) and Reporter's Notebook (Power Block) on GMA News TV
- December 31: DC's Legends of Tomorrow season 2 on One Screen
- December 31: Banner Story, Balita Nuebe Nubenta sa Tanghali, Dear Ate Reysie, Good Morning Inquirer, Headlines Ngayon, KlIQ Music, Nuebe Nubenta Report, Pilipinas Online Bantay OCW, Primetime Balita sa Hapon, Sports IQ and Wow It’s Showbiz on Inquirer 990 Television

==== Stopped airing ====
===== Miscellaneous =====
Program	Channel	Last airing	Resumed airing	Reason
I-Witness	GMA News TV	February 10	July 24	Program on break.
Front Row	GMA News TV	February 11	July 20	Program on break.
Reporter's Notebook	GMA News TV	February 12	July 23	Program on break.
Alisto	GMA News TV	February 14	July 21	Program on break.
My Sassy Girl	GMA News TV	February 14	February 24	Series break.
Stand for Truth	GMA News TV	May 15	September 21	Program replaced by GMA Regional TV Strip beginning May 18
Wansapanataym Presents	Jeepney TV	June 12	July 18	Broadcast replaced by Tubig at Langis beginning June 15.
Panahon Ko 'to!: Ang Game Show ng Buhay Ko (rerun)	Jeepney TV	June 28	July 14	Broadcast replaced by May Bukas Pa beginning July 5.
The Healing Eucharist	TeleRadyo	June 28	May 9, 2021	Broadcast replaced by Sunday Mass Live beginning July 5. Continued broadcast via Kapamilya Channel and Jeepney TV (encore).
Good News Kasama si Vicky Morales	GMA News TV	July 13	November 9 (new episodes)	Temporary suspension of telecast and replaced by New Normal: The Survival Guide on July 20.
Brigada	GMA News TV	July 14	September 19	Temporary suspension of telecast and replaced by New Normal: The Survival Guide on July 20.
iJuander	GMA News TV	July 15	July 26	Temporary suspension of telecast and replaced by New Normal: The Survival Guide on July 20.
Pinas Sarap	GMA News TV	July 16	July 25; November 10 (new episodes)	Temporary suspension of telecast and replaced by New Normal: The Survival Guide on July 20.
Biyahe ni Drew	GMA News TV	July 17	November 13 (new episodes)	Temporary suspension of telecast and replaced by New Normal: The Survival Guide on July 20.
Pop Talk	GMA News TV	July 18	September 17	Temporary suspension of telecast and replaced by Pinas Sarap on July 25.
Pop Talk	GMA News TV	September 18	November 14 (new episodes)	Temporary suspension of telecast due to the channel's weekday afternoon to late evening programming schedule changes (mostly newscasts resumptions and entertainment programming additions) on September 21.
Ang Pinaka	GMA News TV	September 16	November 2	Temporary suspension of telecast due to the channel's weekday afternoon to late evening programming schedule changes (mostly newscasts resumptions and entertainment programming additions) on September 21.
Kabayan	Kapamilya Channel	September 18	October 26	Replaced by Gising Pilipinas! beginning September 21. Continued broadcast via TeleRadyo.
Saksi	GMA News TV	September 18	August 9, 2021 (GTV)	Program replaced by State of the Nation on September 21.
DZBB Executive Summary (Dobol B sa News TV)	GMA News TV	September 20	October 18	Program replaced by Secret Seven and Ugly Duckling beginning September 27.
Cristy FerMinute	One PH	October 2	January 11, 2021	Broadcast replaced by Ted Failon at DJ Chacha sa Radyo5 on October 5, which affect the network's program line-up.
Gising Pilipinas!	Kapamilya Channel and TeleRadyo	October 23 (as a TV program)	October 26 (as a segment of Sakto)	Fused into a segment of Sakto on October 26.
U-Prince Presents	GMA News TV	October 18	January 3, 2021	Series break.
Isyu ATBP. (Dobol B sa News TV)	GMA News TV	October 31 (as a TV program)	November 7 (as a segment of Super Balita sa Umaga Weekend)	Fused into a segment of Super Balita sa Umaga Weekend on November 7.
Toriko (season 3)	GMA News TV	November 1	March 28, 2021 (GMA; season 2)	Program replaced by Flame of Recca beginning November 8.

===== COVID-19 pandemic =====
Program	Channel	Last airing	Resumed airing	Reason
Tulong Ko, Pasa Mo	DZMM TeleRadyo	March 8	April 26	Temporary suspension of telecast due to the COVID-19 pandemic in the Philippines.
Kapamilya Konek	DZMM TeleRadyo	March 8	May 3	Temporary suspension of telecast due to the COVID-19 pandemic in the Philippines.
Investigative Documentaries	GMA News TV	March 12	April 16	Temporary suspension of telecast due to the COVID-19 pandemic in the Philippines.
Pinas Sarap	GMA News TV	March 12	April 16	Temporary suspension of telecast due to the COVID-19 pandemic in the Philippines.
Gising Pilipinas!	DZMM TeleRadyo	March 13	September 21 (TeleRadyo)	Temporary suspension of telecast due to the COVID-19 pandemic in the Philippines.
Biyahe ni Drew	GMA News TV	March 13	April 17	Temporary suspension of telecast due to the COVID-19 pandemic in the Philippines.
Reel Time	GMA News TV	March 13	April 17	Temporary suspension of telecast due to the COVID-19 pandemic in the Philippines.
DZBB Super Serbisyo: Buhay, Trabaho, at Negosyo (Dobol B sa News TV)	GMA News TV	March 14	May 16	Temporary suspension of telecast due to the COVID-19 pandemic in the Philippines and replaced by Public Briefing: #LagingHandaPH beginning March 23.
GMA Regional TV Weekend News	GMA News TV	March 14	May 2	Temporary suspension of telecast due to the COVID-19 pandemic in the Philippines. Temporary moved to GMA Network on March 21 to April 25.
Turbo Zone	GMA News TV	March 14	May 23	Temporary suspension of telecast due to the COVID-19 pandemic in the Philippines.
In Touch with Dr. Charles Stanley	GMA News TV	March 14	May 23	Temporary suspension of telecast due to the COVID-19 pandemic in the Philippines.
Taste Buddies	GMA News TV	March 14	April 18; November 21 (new episodes)	Temporary suspension of telecast due to the COVID-19 pandemic in the Philippines.
Pop Talk	GMA News TV	March 14	April 18	Temporary suspension of telecast due to the COVID-19 pandemic in the Philippines.
Sagupaan TV	S+A	March 14	September 5 (One Sports; as Sagupaan High Action TV)	Temporary suspension of telecast due to the COVID-19 pandemic in the Philippines.
Magpayo Nga Kayo	DZMM TeleRadyo	March 14	May 9 (TeleRadyo)	Temporary suspension of telecast due to the COVID-19 pandemic in the Philippines.
Omaga-Diaz Report	DZMM TeleRadyo	March 14	April 26 (Sunday edition); May 2 (Saturday edition)	Temporary suspension of telecast due to the COVID-19 pandemic in the Philippines.
Tunay na Buhay	GMA News TV	March 15	July 22	Temporary suspension of telecast due to the COVID-19 pandemic in the Philippines.
Ang Pinaka	GMA News TV	March 15	September 14	Temporary suspension of telecast due to the COVID-19 pandemic in the Philippines.
Idol sa Kusina	GMA News TV	March 15	April 19; October 18 (new episodes)	Temporary suspension of telecast due to the COVID-19 pandemic in the Philippines.
Glow Up	GMA News TV	March 15	April 19	Temporary suspension of telecast due to the COVID-19 pandemic in the Philippines.
U-Prince Presents	GMA News TV	March 15	May 23	Temporary suspension of telecast due to the COVID-19 pandemic in the Philippines.
The Legend of Paranormal Stories	GMA News TV	March 15	May 23	Temporary suspension of telecast due to the COVID-19 pandemic in the Philippines.
Sagot Ko 'Yan!	DZMM TeleRadyo	March 15	April 26	Temporary suspension of telecast due to the COVID-19 pandemic in the Philippines.
Yesterday	DZMM TeleRadyo	March 15	April 26	Temporary suspension of telecast due to the COVID-19 pandemic in the Philippines.
Red Alert	DZMM TeleRadyo	March 15	April 26	Temporary suspension of telecast due to the COVID-19 pandemic in the Philippines.
Family TV Mass	One Sports	March 15	July 5	Temporary suspension of telecast due to the COVID-19 pandemic in the Philippines.
Asenso Pinoy	S+A	March 15	November 14 (A2Z)	Temporary suspension of telecast due to the COVID-19 pandemic in the Philippines.
We Bare Bears	CNN Philippines	March 15	March 28	Temporary suspension of telecast due to the disinfection of the building where the network is being housed as the employee of another company tested positive for COVID-19.
TV Healing Mass For The Homebound	CNN Philippines	March 15	July 19	Temporary suspension of telecast due to the COVID-19 pandemic in the Philippines.
TV Healing Mass For The Homebound	CNN Philippines	August 2	September 13	Temporary suspension of telecast due to the modified enhanced community quarantine in Metro Manila. Continued broadcast through online.
Good News Kasama si Vicky Morales	GMA News TV	March 16	April 13	Temporary suspension of telecast due to the COVID-19 pandemic in the Philippines.
Planet Earth II	GMA News TV	March 16	April 13	Temporary suspension of telecast due to the COVID-19 pandemic in the Philippines.
One Balita	One PH	March 16	June 1 (as One Balita Pilipinas)	Temporary suspension of telecast due to the COVID-19 pandemic in the Philippines.
One Balita Pilipinas	One PH	March 16	May 7	Temporary suspension of telecast due to the COVID-19 pandemic in the Philippines.
The Big Story	One News	March 16	May 7	Temporary suspension of telecast due to the COVID-19 pandemic in the Philippines.
Bawal ang Pasaway kay Mareng Winnie	GMA News TV	March 17	April 14	Temporary suspension of telecast due to the COVID-19 pandemic in the Philippines.
Brigada	GMA News TV	March 17	April 14	Temporary suspension of telecast due to the COVID-19 pandemic in the Philippines.
Dr. Love Radio Show	DZMM TeleRadyo	March 18	April 20	Temporary suspension of telecast due to the COVID-19 pandemic in the Philippines.
On the Spot	DZMM TeleRadyo	March 18	September 1(TeleRadyo)	Temporary suspension of telecast due to the COVID-19 pandemic in the Philippines.
Todo-Todo Walang Preno	DZMM TeleRadyo	March 18	May 4	Temporary suspension of telecast due to the COVID-19 pandemic in the Philippines.
Aladdin: You Would've Heard the Name	GMA News TV	March 18	May 23	Temporary suspension of telecast due to the COVID-19 pandemic in the Philippines.
Balitanghali	GMA News TV	March 18	September 21	Temporary suspension of telecast due to the COVID-19 pandemic in the Philippines.
Man x Man	GMA News TV	March 18	May 25	Temporary suspension of telecast due to the COVID-19 pandemic in the Philippines.
Price of Passion	GMA News TV	March 18	June 8	Temporary suspension of telecast due to the COVID-19 pandemic in the Philippines.
News TV Live	GMA News TV	March 18	September 21	Temporary suspension of telecast due to the COVID-19 pandemic in the Philippines.
News TV Quick Response Team	GMA News TV	March 18	September 21	Temporary suspension of telecast due to the COVID-19 pandemic in the Philippines.
State of the Nation with Jessica Soho	GMA News TV	March 18	September 21	Temporary suspension of telecast due to the COVID-19 pandemic in the Philippines.
Stand for Truth	GMA News TV	March 18	April 13	Temporary suspension of telecast due to the COVID-19 pandemic in the Philippines.
iJuander	GMA News TV	March 18	April 15	Temporary suspension of telecast due to the COVID-19 pandemic in the Philippines.
Tonight with Arnold Clavio	GMA News TV	March 18	April 15	Temporary suspension of telecast due to the COVID-19 pandemic in the Philippines.
EZ Shop	One Sports	March 20	October 15	Temporary suspension of telecast due to the COVID-19 pandemic in the Philippines. Continued broadcast throungh its standalone channel.
Sakto	DZMM TeleRadyo	March 19	October 26 (TeleRadyo)	Temporary suspension of telecast due to the COVID-19 pandemic in the Philippines.
Good Vibes	DZMM TeleRadyo	March 19	June 15 (TeleRadyo)	Temporary suspension of telecast due to the COVID-19 pandemic in the Philippines.
Magpahanggang Wakas	Jeepney TV	March 20	June 22	Temporary suspension of telecast due to the channel's midnight to morning programming schedule changes amid the COVID-19 pandemic in the Philippines.
Precious Hearts Romances Presents: Quikilig!	Jeepney TV	March 20	April 4	Temporary suspension of telecast due to the channel's midnight to morning programming schedule changes amid the COVID-19 pandemic in the Philippines.
You're My Home	Jeepney TV	March 20	June 7	Temporary suspension of telecast due to the channel's midnight to morning programming schedule changes amid the COVID-19 pandemic in the Philippines.
Radyo Negosyo	DZMM TeleRadyo	March 21	April 25	Temporary suspension of telecast due to the COVID-19 pandemic in the Philippines.
WWE Raw	One Sports	March 26	June 18	Temporary suspension of telecast due to the COVID-19 pandemic in the Philippines.
WWE SmackDown	One Sports	March 26	June 18	Temporary suspension of telecast due to the COVID-19 pandemic in the Philippines.
Talking Heads with Rose Solangon	One Sports	March 28	May 16 (BEAM TV)	Temporary suspension of telecast due to the COVID-19 pandemic in the Philippines.
One Championship	One Sports	March 28	June 15	Temporary suspension of telecast due to the COVID-19 pandemic in the Philippines.
Geeks & Gamers Guide	One Sports	March 29	January 24, 2021	Temporary suspension of telecast due to the COVID-19 pandemic in the Philippines.
Basketball Science	One Sports	March 29	June 16	Temporary suspension of telecast due to the COVID-19 pandemic in the Philippines.
The Huddle	One Sports	March 29	July 3	Temporary suspension of telecast due to the COVID-19 pandemic in the Philippines.
30 for 30	One Sports	March 29	June 20	Temporary suspension of telecast due to the COVID-19 pandemic in the Philippines.
Balitang Bisdak	GMA News TV	June 23	July 14	Temporary suspension of broadcast due to the "enhanced community quarantine" in Cebu City.
GMA Regional TV Live!	GMA News TV	June 26	July 17	Temporary suspension of broadcast due to the "enhanced community quarantine" in Cebu City.
Idol in Action	One PH	August 25	September 3	Temporary suspension of broadcast and replaced with re-runs due to the massive disinfection of TV5 Media Center after an employee tested positive for COVID-19. It was supposed to resume on September 2, but was delayed to September 3 due to technical difficulties. The program resumed broadcast on September 3.

===== Shutdown of ABS-CBN broadcasting =====
Program	Channel	Last airing	Resumed airing	Reason
The Word Exposed	S+A	May 3	November 13, 2022 (Solar Flix)	Temporary suspension of telecast due to shutdown of ABS-CBN broadcast stations amid the expired franchise. Continued broadcast via ABS-CBN News Channel and TV Maria.
Agri TV	S+A	May 3	September 25, 2022 (IBC; as Agri TV Atbp.: Kasama sa Hanapbuhay)	Temporary suspension of telecast due to shutdown of ABS-CBN broadcast stations amid the expired franchise.
Upfront	S+A	May 3	May 17 (Liga)	Temporary suspension of telecast due to shutdown of ABS-CBN broadcast stations amid the expired franchise.
The Healing Eucharist	Jeepney TV and S+A	May 3	May 24 (Jeepney TV)	Temporary suspension of telecast due to shutdown of ABS-CBN broadcast stations amid the expired franchise and replaced by Kapamilya Sunday Mass via Jeepney TV on May 10. Continued broadcast via TeleRadyo.
AC Weekend Cinema	Asianovela Channel	May 3	June 6	Temporary suspension of telecast due to shutdown of ABS-CBN broadcast stations amid the expired franchise.
Asian Weekday Movie Fest	Asianovela Channel	May 5	June 1	Temporary suspension of telecast due to shutdown of ABS-CBN broadcast stations amid the expired franchise.
Team Fitfil	S+A	May 5	May 11 (Liga); June 13 (Kapamilya Channel)	Temporary suspension of telecast due to shutdown of ABS-CBN broadcast stations amid the expired franchise.
It's Showtime sa Primetime	Jeepney TV	May 9	July 13	Temporary suspension of telecast due to shutdown of ABS-CBN broadcast stations amid the expired franchise and replaced by the encore of "Tawa Way Zone" strip. Program temporary aired as the live regular episode simulcast on June 13 to July 11.
ASAP Natin 'To: Encore	Jeepney TV	May 10	June 28 (Metro Channel)	Temporary suspension of telecast due to shutdown of ABS-CBN broadcast stations amid the expired franchise and replaced by the encore of "Tawa Way Zone" strip.
Magandang Buhay: Momshies sa Hapon	Jeepney TV	May 29	N/A	Temporary suspension of telecast due to shutdown of ABS-CBN broadcast stations amid the expired franchise and replaced by the replay of "Tubig at Langis".
PJ Masks	Yey!	June 28	May 8, 2021 (A2Z)	Temporary suspension of telecast due to shutdown of ABS-CBN TV Plus and Sky Direct.
Masha and the Bear	Yey!	June 28	May 8, 2021 (A2Z); July 16, 2022 (Kapamilya Channel)	Temporary suspension of telecast due to shutdown of ABS-CBN TV Plus and Sky Direct.
Wansapanataym	Yey!	June 28	July 18 (Jeepney TV; as Wansapanataym Presents)	Temporary suspension of telecast due to shutdown of ABS-CBN TV Plus and Sky Direct.
Story of Yanxi Palace	Asianovela Channel	June 30	November 2 (Kapamilya Channel)	Temporary suspension of telecast due to shutdown of ABS-CBN TV Plus.
Kongsuni and Friends	Yey!	July 1	March 13, 2021 (Kapamilya Channel); November 6, 2021 (Jeepney TV)	Temporary suspension of telecast due to shutdown of ABS-CBN TV Plus and Sky Direct.
Pororo The Little Penguin	Yey!	July 1	February 13, 2021 (A2Z; English duubed); July 16, 2022 (Kapamilya Channel)	Temporary suspension of telecast due to shutdown of ABS-CBN TV Plus and Sky Direct.
Pop Babies	Yey!	July 1	September 12 (Kapamilya Channel)	Temporary suspension of telecast due to shutdown of ABS-CBN TV Plus and Sky Direct.
Mr. Bean: The Animated Series	Yey!	July 1	July 16, 2022 (A2Z)	Temporary suspension of telecast due to shutdown of ABS-CBN TV Plus and Sky Direct.
Adventures of Sonic the Hedgehog	Yey!	July 1	January 17, 2022 (Jeepney TV); February 5, 2022 (Kapamilya Channel)	Temporary suspension of telecast due to shutdown of ABS-CBN TV Plus and Sky Direct.
Team Yey!	Yey!	July 1	September 12 (Kapamilya Channel; season 5); October 10 (A2Z; past episodes); November 6, 2021 (Jeepney TV)	Temporary suspension of telecast due to shutdown of ABS-CBN TV Plus and Sky Direct.
Cardcaptor Sakura: Clear Card	Yey!	July 1	September 4, 2021 (A2Z)	Temporary suspension of telecast due to shutdown of ABS-CBN TV Plus and Sky Direct.

==== Cancelled ====
- March 9: UAAP Season 82 on S+A (reason: The University Athletic Association of the Philippines announced the cancellation of its season on April 7 due to COVID-19 pandemic in the Philippines.)
- March 10: 2020 Philippine Super Liga Grand Prix Conference on One Sports and One Sports+ (reason: The Philippine Super Liga announced the cancellation of its season due to COVID-19 pandemic in the Philippines.)
- March 11: 2020 PBA D-League Aspirants' Cup on One Sports and PBA Rush (reason: The Philippine Basketball Association announced the cancellation of its current season as well as the dissolution of the said developmental league on October 12 due to COVID-19 pandemic in the Philippines.)
- March 13: Kay Susan Tayo! sa Super Radyo DZBB (Dobol B sa News TV) on GMA News TV (reason: Program announced its cancellation due to the COVID-19 pandemic in the Philippines and replaced by Bantay COVID-19 coverage on March 16–18 and Public Briefing: #LagingHandaPH beginning March 23 on Dobol B sa News TV block.)
- March 24: Talkback on ANC (reason: Program announced its cancellation due to the COVID-19 pandemic in the Philippines and the ABS-CBN franchise renewal controversy.)
- August 10: Burado on Kapamilya Channel (reason: Program announced its cancellation due to COVID-19 pandemic in the Philippines and overseas. Show was not yet debut on the said network. Program renamed to and premiered as Walang Hanggang Paalam on September 28 via Kapamilya Channel and October 12 via A2Z.)
- September 18: Kahit Minsan Lang on Kapamilya Channel (reason: Program announced its cancellation due to the lockdowns caused by the COVID-19 pandemic in the Philippines. Show was not yet debut on the said network. Program renamed to and premiered as A Family Affair on June 27, 2022, via Kapamilya Channel, A2Z and TV5.)
- September 30: Cara y Cruz on Kapamilya Channel (reason: Program announced its cancellation due to Julia Barretto's departure from Star Magic and joined Viva Artist Agency. Show was not yet debut on the said network. Program renamed to and premiered as Bagong Umaga on October 26 via Kapamilya Channel and A2Z.)
- October 1: Ang Lihim ni Ligaya on Kapamilya Channel (reason: Program announced its cancellation due to Ivana Alawi's backing out from the production amid the COVID-19 pandemic in the Philippines. Show was not yet debut on the said network. Program renamed to and premiered as La Vida Lena on November 14 (as a pilot series) via iWantTFC and on June 28, 2021 (as a full series) via Kapamilya Channel, A2Z and TV5.)

===== Unknown =====
- Future Perfect, Green Living and On the Money on ANC (reason: Programs announced its cancellation due to the COVID-19 pandemic in the Philippines and the ABS-CBN franchise renewal controversy.)
- Alvin and the Chipmunks (2015) on Yey!

=== Video streaming services ===
- January 31: Ampalaya Chronicles on iWant
- February 26: My Single Lady on iWant
- March 3: I Am U on iWant
- March 30: Manilennials on iWant
- April 3: Fluid on iWant
- April 22: The Tapes on iWant
- May 15: Jet and the Pet Rangers on iWant
- August 19: Beauty Queens on iWant
- August 19: Hello Stranger on YouTube (Black Sheep)
- September 20: Gameboys (season 1) on YouTube (The IdeaFirst Company)
- October 30: Quaranthings (season 1) on YouTube (Ride or Die)
- November 20: Gaya Sa Pelikula on YouTube (Globe Studios)
- November 26: Ben X Jim (season 1) on YouTube (Regal Entertainment)
- November 29: Boys' Lockdown on YouTube (Ticket2Me)
- December 5: Coke Studio: Peel Mo, Panalo Promo on YouTube (Coke Studio Philippines)
- December 10: Oh, Mando! on iWantTFC
- December 19: Bawal Lumabas: The Series on iWantTFC

== Networks ==
The following are a list of free-to-air and cable channels or networks launches and closures in 2020.

=== Launches ===
Date	Station	Type	Channel	Source
February 8	Hillsong Channel	Cable and satellite	Cignal Channel 184 (Nationwide); Sky Cable Channel 21 (Metro Manila)	
February 17	Premier Football	Cable and satellite	Sky Cable Channel 265 (HD) (Metro Manila)	
February 17	Premier Tennis	Cable and satellite	Sky Cable Channel 264 (HD) (Metro Manila)	
February 17	TAP W	Cable and satellite	Sky Cable Channel 215 (SD) (Metro Manila)	
February	Locale	Cable and satellite	Sky Cable Channel 77 (Metro Manila)	
March 1	HITS Movies	Cable and satellite	Cignal Channel 58 (Nationwide); Cablelink Channel 39 (Metro Manila)	
April 1	Front Row Channel	Cable and satellite	Various channel listings Cablelink Channel 36 (Metro Manila)	
June 13	Kapamilya Channel	Cable and satellite	Cignal Channel 22 (Nationwide)^{1} Sky Direct Channel 2 (HD) (Nationwide); G Sat Channel 2 (Nationwide) (old) & Channel 22 (Nationwide) (new)^{2} SatLite Channel 22 (Nationwide)^{1} Sky Cable Channel 8 (SD) / Channel 167 (HD) (Metro Manila) & Channel 2 (SD) / Channel 700 (HD) (Provincial); Destiny Cable Channel 8 (SD) / Channel 167 (HD) (Metro Manila); Cablelink Channel 8 (Metro Manila)	
June 13	Word of God Network	Cable and satellite	Cignal Channel 153 (Nationwide); Sky Cable Channel 25 (SD) (Nationwide)^{3}	
June 15	One Screen	Cable and satellite	Cignal Channel 9 (Nationwide); SatLite Channel 35 (Nationwide)	
June 29	Heart of Asia	Free-to-air	DTT Channel 7.03; GMA Affordabox Channel 3 (Metro Manila); Cignal TV Channel 38 (Nationwide); Sky Cable Channel 51 (Metro Manila)	
July 15	Fight COVID-19 (information channel)	Cable and satellite	G Sat Channel 51 (Nationwide)	
July 31	NBA TV Philippines	Cable and satellite	Cignal Channel 96 (SD) / Channel 262 (HD) (Nationwide); SatLite Channel 52 (Nationwide)	
August 11	Solar Learning	Free-to-air	Channel 21 (DepEd ALS) / Channel 30 (DepEd-NCR Central)	
September 20	Hallypop	Free-to-air	DTT Channel 7.04; GMA Affordabox Channel 4 (Metro Manila); Sky Cable Channel 57 (Metro Manila); Cignal TV Channel 152 (Nationwide)	
September	Jao TV	Regional	Channel 51 (digital feed) (Cagayan de Oro); Parasat Cable TV Channel 29 (Cagayan de Oro)	
October 5	DepEd TV	Broadcasting service	Various channel and program listings GMA Affordabox Channel 7 (Metro Manila)^{4} Cignal Channel 149 (Nationwide); SatLite Channel 189 (Nationwide)	
October 8	Amazing Discoveries TV	Cable and satellite	G Sat Channel 35 (Nationwide)	
October 10	A2Z (ZOE TV)	Broadcasting network	Channel 11 (analog feed) / Channel 20 (digital feed)^{5} Cignal Channel 20 (Nationwide); G Sat Channel 9 (Nationwide); SatLite Channel 20 (Nationwide); Sky Cable Channel 11 (Nationwide); Destiny Cable Channel 11 (Metro Manila); Cablelink Channel 33 (Metro Manila)	

=== Stations changing network affiliation ===
The following is a list of television stations that have made or will make noteworthy affiliation switches in 2020.

Date	Station	Channel	Prior affiliation	New affiliation	Notes	Source
June 22	DZOE-TV	11 (analog feed) / 20 (digital feed)	silent	ZOE TV	One year after the termination of the blocktimer agreement between the network and GMA Network, Inc., the parent company of GMA News TV, as well as the move of the said news channel to channel 27 in June 2019, ZOE Broadcasting Network has reactivated the channel 11 analog signal at the same time the digital channel 20 assignment opened. The company has plan to work with blocktimers to open channel lease offers while the channel is on test broadcast and reserved for programming.	
October 10	DZOE-TV	11 (analog feed) / 20 (digital feed)	ZOE TV	A2Z	On October 6, ZOE Broadcasting Network awarded its blocktime programming agreement to media conglomerate ABS-CBN Corporation, parent company of cable-only networks Kapamilya Channel, Jeepney TV and Cine Mo! for its entertainment programming and the company's affiliated non-profit organization Knowledge Channel for its educational programming and would reformatting channel 11 into A2Z. Christian programming seen on its sister channel Light TV would also shown on the reformatted channel, along with programming supplied by licensors, content providers and ministry programing partners including CBN Asia and Trinity Broadcasting Network. ABS-CBN also handle advertising sales for most of the entertainment shows broadcast on the new network with profits would be donated to support the ministry outreach projects of ZOE's parent church organization Jesus is Lord Church, and it marked the return of the company's programming on free TV following the cease-and-desist order by National Telecommunications Commission due to expired legislative franchise on May 5 and the denial of its renewed legislative franchise on July 10.	

=== Rebranded ===
The following is a list of television stations or cable channels that have made or will make noteworthy network rebrands in 2020.

Date	Rebranded from	Rebranded to	Type	Channel	Source
February 17	EDGEsport	TAP EDGE	Cable and satellite	Sky Cable Channel 218 (SD) (Metro Manila)	
February 17	TAP Sports 1	TAP Sports	Cable and satellite	Sky Cable Channel 188 (HD) (Metro Manila)	
February 17	TAP Sports 2	TAP Sports	Cable and satellite	Sky Cable Channel 188 (HD) (Metro Manila)	
March 8	5 Plus	One Sports	Broadcasting network	Channel 41 (analog feed); Cignal Channel 15 (Nationwide); Sky Direct Channel 37 (Nationwide); SatLite Channel 6 (Nationwide); Sky Cable / Destiny Cable Channel 59 (Metro Manila); Cablelink Channel 11 (Metro Manila)	
March 8	One Sports	One Sports+	Cable and satellite	Cignal Channel 91 (SD) / Channel 261 (HD) (Nationwide); Cablelink Channel 60 (Metro Manila)	
May 8	DZMM TeleRadyo	TeleRadyo	Broadcasting channel	DTT Channel 1.05; ABS-CBN TV Plus Channel 5 (Metro Manila); Sky Direct Channel 6 (Nationwide); Sky Cable / Destiny Cable Channel 26 (Metro Manila)	
August 15	The 5 Network	TV5 (2nd incarnation)	Broadcasting network	Channel 5 (analog feed) / Channel 18/51 (digital feed); Cignal Channel 5 (Nationwide); Sky Direct Channel 5 (Nationwide); G Sat Channel 5 (Nationwide); SatLite Channel 5 (Nationwide); Sky Cable / Destiny Cable Channel 10 (Metro Manila); Cablelink Channel 10 (Metro Manila)	
November 2	TAP W	TAP TV	Cable and satellite	Sky Cable Channel 215 (Metro Manila)	

=== Closures ===
Date	Station	Type	Channel	Sign-on debut	Source
January 1	Diva	Cable and satellite	Cignal Channel 125 (Nationwide); Sky Cable Channel 37 (Metro Manila)	September 19, 2009	
January 1	E!	Cable and satellite	Cignal Channel 61 (Nationwide); Sky Cable Channel 57 (SD) / Channel 207 (HD) (Metro Manila)	July 1, 2011	
January 29	Setanta Sports	Cable and satellite	Sky Cable Channel 87 (Metro Manila)	July 16, 2012	
March 1	Paramount Channel	Cable and satellite	Sky Cable Channel 85 (SD) / Channel 263 (HD) (Metro Manila)	June 1, 2019	
March 1	Zee Sine	Cable and satellite	G Sat Channel 18 (Nationwide); Sky Cable Channel 112 (Metro Manila); Cablelink Channel 45 (Metro Manila)	April 5, 2016	
March 21	Pop Life TV	Cable and satellite	G Sat Channel 32 (Nationwide); Sky Cable Channel 119 (Metro Manila); Cablelink Channel 33 (Metro Manila)	April 8, 2019	
April 1	Jack TV	Cable and satellite	Cignal Channel 126 (Nationwide); G Sat Channel 61 (Nationwide); SatLite Channel 92 (Nationwide); Sky Cable Channel 51 (Metro Manila) / Channel 617 (Provincial); Cablelink Channel 36 (Metro Manila)	April 6, 2005	
May 4	STV	Free-to-air	DTT Channel 37.02	January 15, 2018	
May 5	ABS-CBN (HD; 2nd incarnation)	Broadcasting network	Channel 2 (analog feed) / Channel 16/43 (digital feed); Cignal Channel 2 (Nationwide); Sky Direct Channel 2 (HD) (Nationwide); G Sat Channel 2 (Nationwide); SatLite Channel 2 (Nationwide); Sky Cable Channel 8 (SD) / Channel 167 (HD) (Metro Manila) & Channel 2 (SD) / Channel 700 (HD) (Provincial); Destiny Cable Channel 8 (SD) / Channel 167 (HD) (Metro Manila); Cablelink Channel 8 (Metro Manila)	September 14, 1986	
May 5	S+A	Broadcasting network	Channel 23 (analog feed); Cignal Channel 23 (Nationwide); Sky Direct Channel 24 (HD) (Nationwide); G Sat Channel 8 (Nationwide); SatLite Channel 23 (Nationwide); Sky Cable Channel 17 (SD) / Channel 166 (HD) (Metro Manila) & Channel 8 (SD) / Channel 701 (HD) (Provincial); Destiny Cable Channel 17 (SD) / Channel 166 (HD) (Metro Manila); Cablelink Channel 16 (Metro Manila)	January 18, 2014	
May 5	Movie Central	Free-to-air channel	DTT Channel 2.04; ABS-CBN TV Plus Channel 10 (Metro Manila)	July 30, 2018	
June 30	Asianovela Channel	Free-to-air channel	DTT Channel 2.03; ABS-CBN TV Plus Channel 2 (formerly Channel 9) (Metro Manila)	July 30, 2018	
June 30	KBO	Pay-per-view	DTT Channel 1.06; ABS-CBN TV Plus Channel 6 (Metro Manila); Sky Direct Channel 45 (Nationwide); Sky Cable Channel 158 (SD) / Channel 258 (HD) (Metro Manila) & Channel 58 (SD) / Channel 958 (HD) (Provincial)	March 7, 2016	
June 30	Yey!	Broadcasting channel	DTT Channel 1.04; ABS-CBN TV Plus Channel 4 (Metro Manila); Sky Direct Channel 3 (Nationwide); Sky Cable Channel 1 (Metro Manila) / Channel 109 (Provincial); Destiny Cable Channel 1 (Metro Manila)	January 3, 2011	
July 7	Fox Filipino	Cable and satellite	Cignal Channel 44 (Nationwide); G Sat Channel 108 (Nationwide); SatLite Channel 34 (Nationwide); Sky Cable Channel 115 (Metro Manila) / Channel 629 (Provincial); Cablelink Channel 53 (Metro Manila)	March 1, 2012	
July 9	Living Asia Channel	Cable and satellite	Cablelink Channel 102 (Metro Manila); SkyCable Channel 113 (Metro Manila)	April 6, 2004	
July 9	SLTV	Cable and satellite	Cignal Channel 107 (Nationwide); SkyCable Channel 232 (Metro Manila)	June 12, 2016	
September 15	FilmBox Arthouse	Cable and satellite	Sky Cable Channel 83 (Metro Manila)	January 1, 2019	
October 30	Liga	Cable and satellite	Sky Direct Channel 14 (Nationwide)^{6} Sky Cable Channel 86 (SD) / Channel 183 (HD) (Metro Manila) & Channel 308 (SD) / Channel 757 (HD) (Provincial)	January 1, 2018	
November 1	O Shopping	Broadcasting channel	DTT Channel 2.02^{7} ABS-CBN TV Plus Channel 8 (Metro Manila)^{7} Cignal Channel 33 (Nationwide)^{7} Sky Direct Channel 11 (Nationwide)^{6} Sky Cable Channel 11 (Nationwide) (old) & Channel 25 (Metro Manila) / Channel 21 (Provincial) (new)^{8} Cablelink Channel 7 (Metro Manila)	October 14, 2013	
December 31	Inquirer 990 Television	Free-to-air	Channel 50 (digital feed); Sky Cable Channel 72 (Metro Manila); Cablelink Channel 4 (Metro Manila)	May 9, 2016	

=== Stopped broadcasting ===
The following is a list of stations and channels or networks that have stopped broadcasting or (temporarily) off the air in 2020.

==== Miscellaneous ====
Station	Type	Channel	Last broadcasting	Resumed broadcasting	Reason	Source
Solar Learning	Broadcasting channel	Channel 21 (DepEd ALS) / Channel 30 (DepEd-NCR Central); Cablelink Channel 6 (SD) / Channel 205 (HD) (Metro Manila)	August 14 (end of first test broadcast)	September 21 (start of second test broadcast)	Temporary suspension of broadcasting due to the postponement on the opening of regular classes in public schools to October 5.	
Solar Learning	Broadcasting channel	Channel 21 (DepEd ALS) / Channel 30 (DepEd-NCR Central); Cablelink Channel 6 (SD) / Channel 205 (HD) (Metro Manila)	September 25 (end of second test broadcast)	October 5 (formal launch)	Temporary suspension of broadcasting due to the conclusion of the second week-long test broadcast.	

==== COVID-19 pandemic ====
Station	Type	Channel	Last broadcasting	Resumed broadcasting	Reason	Source
Inquirer 990 Television	Broadcasting channel	Channel 50 (digital feed); Sky Cable Channel 72 (Metro Manila); Cablelink Channel 4 (Metro Manila)	March 17	April 6	Temporary suspension of broadcasting due to the production at technical challenges made by the COVID-19 pandemic, but the operations continue through online.	
CNN Philippines (RPN)	Broadcasting network	Channel 9 (analog feed) / Channel 19 (digital feed); Cignal Channel 10 (Nationwide); Sky Direct Channel 9 (Nationwide); G Sat Channel 3 (Nationwide); SatLite Channel 9 (Nationwide); Sky Cable / Destiny Cable Channel 14 (Metro Manila); Cablelink Channel 14 (Metro Manila)	March 18	March 23	Temporary suspension of broadcasting due to the disinfection of the building where the network is being housed as the employee of another company tested positive for COVID-19, but the operations continue through online.	
CNN Philippines (RPN)	Broadcasting network	Channel 9 (analog feed) / Channel 19 (digital feed); Cignal Channel 10 (Nationwide); Sky Direct Channel 9 (Nationwide); G Sat Channel 3 (Nationwide); SatLite Channel 9 (Nationwide); Sky Cable / Destiny Cable Channel 14 (Metro Manila); Cablelink Channel 14 (Metro Manila)	July 7	July 11	Temporary suspension of broadcasting due to the disinfection of the building where the network is being housed as the employee of the network tested positive for COVID-19, but the operations continue through online.	
GMA News TV	Broadcasting network	Channel 27 (analog feed) / Channel 15 (digital feed); Cignal Channel 11 (Nationwide); Sky Direct Channel 10 (Nationwide); G Sat Channel 6 (Nationwide); SatLite Channel 10 (Nationwide); Sky Cable / Destiny Cable Channel 24 (Metro Manila); Cablelink Channel 13 (Metro Manila)	March 19	March 21 (simulcast of 24 Oras and DZBB programs only); April 13 (extended primetime programming slot); September 21 (regular programming lineup slot)	Temporary suspension of broadcasting due to the COVID-19 pandemic.	
BEAM TV	Broadcasting network	Channel 31 (analog feed) / Channel 50 (digital feed); Sky Direct Channel 54 (Nationwide); Sky Cable Channel 72 (Metro Manila); Cablelink Channel 6 (Metro Manila)	March 20	May 16	Temporary suspension of broadcasting due to the COVID-19 pandemic.	
One Sports	Broadcasting network	Channel 41 (analog feed); Cignal Channel 15 (Nationwide); Sky Direct Channel 37 (Nationwide); SatLite Channel 6 (Nationwide); Sky Cable / Destiny Cable Channel 59 (Metro Manila); Cablelink Channel 11 (Metro Manila)	March 30	June 15	Temporary suspension of broadcasting due to the COVID-19 pandemic.	
PTV	Broadcasting network	Channel 4 (analog feed) / Channel 42 (digital feed); Cignal Channel 4 (Nationwide); G Sat Channel 4 (Nationwide); SatLite Channel 4 (Nationwide); Sky Cable / Destiny Cable Channel 6 (Metro Manila); Cablelink Channel 9 (Metro Manila)	July 19	July 20	Temporary suspension of broadcasting due to the COVID-19 pandemic.	Temporary suspension of broadcasting due to the disinfection of the building where the network is being housed as the employee of the network tested positive for COVID-19, but the operations continue through online.

==== Shutdown of ABS-CBN broadcasting ====
Station	Type	Channel	Last broadcasting	Resumed broadcasting	Reason	Source
ABS-CBN (HD; 2nd incarnation)	Broadcasting network	Channel 2 (analog feed) / Channel 16/43 (digital feed); Cignal Channel 2 (Nationwide); Sky Direct Channel 2 (HD) (Nationwide); G Sat Channel 2 (Nationwide); SatLite Channel 2 (Nationwide); Sky Cable Channel 8 (SD) / Channel 167 (HD) (Metro Manila) & Channel 2 (SD) / Channel 700 (HD) (Provincial); Destiny Cable Channel 8 (SD) / Channel 167 (HD) (Metro Manila); Cablelink Channel 8 (Metro Manila)	May 5	N/A	The National Telecommunications Commission issued a cease and desist order on ABS-CBN Corporation to temporary close its broadcasting operations including its radio stations DZMM and MOR, following the expiration of its broadcast franchise (Republic Act No. 7966, which was granted on March 30, 1995) on May 4, the day before. Absorbed as a new media network under ABS-CBN Digital Media. All current and upcoming programs were transferred to the following networks (as ad interim replacement network): Kapamilya Channel beginning on June 13 (with the exception of selected current and upcoming programming due to its cancellation and moved or transferred to another network, amid the COVID-19 pandemic and ABS-CBN franchise renewal controversy) and A2Z beginning on October 10 (as part of blocktime deal with ZOE; selected shows only).	
S+A	Broadcasting network	Channel 23 (analog feed); Cignal Channel 23 (Nationwide); Sky Direct Channel 24 (HD) (Nationwide); G Sat Channel 8 (Nationwide); SatLite Channel 23 (Nationwide); Sky Cable Channel 17 (SD) / Channel 166 (HD) (Metro Manila) & Channel 8 (SD) / Channel 701 (HD) (Provincial); Destiny Cable Channel 17 (SD) / Channel 166 (HD) (Metro Manila); Cablelink Channel 16 (Metro Manila)	May 5	N/A	The National Telecommunications Commission issued a cease and desist order on ABS-CBN Corporation to temporary close its broadcasting operations including its radio stations DZMM and MOR, following the expiration of its broadcast franchise (Republic Act No. 7966, which was granted on March 30, 1995) on May 4, the day before. Some programs were aired on Liga (as ad interim replacement network, a cable sports channel owned by Creative Programs, Inc., through its content provider, ABS-CBN Sports) beginning on the following day until October 30.	
DZMM TeleRadyo	Broadcasting channel	DTT Channel 1.05; ABS-CBN TV Plus Channel 5 (Metro Manila); Sky Direct Channel 6 (Nationwide); Sky Cable Channel 26 (Metro Manila) / Channel 501 (Provincial); Destiny Cable Channel 26 (Metro Manila)	May 5	May 8 (as TeleRadyo)	The National Telecommunications Commission issued a cease and desist order on ABS-CBN Corporation to temporary close its broadcasting operations including its radio stations DZMM and MOR, following the expiration of its broadcast franchise (Republic Act No. 7966, which was granted on March 30, 1995) on May 4, the day before. Renamed as TeleRadyo immediately before went to temporary off the air until May 8.	
Movie Central	Free-to-air	DTT Channel 2.04; ABS-CBN TV Plus Channel 10 (Metro Manila)	May 5	June 14 (as a programming block via Kapamilya Channel and later via All TV from January 2 to February 16, 2026)	The National Telecommunications Commission issued a cease and desist order on ABS-CBN Corporation to temporary close its broadcasting operations including its radio stations DZMM and MOR, following the expiration of its broadcast franchise (Republic Act No. 7966, which was granted on March 30, 1995) on May 4, the day before.	
Asianovela Channel	Free-to-air	DTT Channel 2.03; ABS-CBN TV Plus Channel 9 (Metro Manila)	May 5	June 1	The National Telecommunications Commission issued a cease and desist order on ABS-CBN Corporation to temporary close its broadcasting operations including its radio stations DZMM and MOR, following the expiration of its broadcast franchise (Republic Act No. 7966, which was granted on March 30, 1995) on May 4, the day before. The digital channel feed was being reassigned as a temporary replacement of S+A beginning on June 1.	
Asianovela Channel	Free-to-air	DTT Channel 1.02; ABS-CBN TV Plus Channel 2 (Metro Manila)	July 1	N/A	The National Telecommunications Commission issued an alias cease and desist order on ABS-CBN TV Plus and Sky Direct to temporary close its broadcasting operations following the expiration of its broadcast franchise (Republic Act No. 7966 and 7969, which both granted on March 30, 1995) on May 4. Some programs were transferred to Kapamilya Channel beginning on June 13.	
KBO	Pay-per-view	DTT Channel 1.06; ABS-CBN TV Plus Channel 6 (Metro Manila); Sky Direct Channel 45 (Nationwide); Sky Cable Channel 158 (SD) / Channel 258 (HD) (Metro Manila) & Channel 58 (SD) / Channel 958 (HD) (Provincial)	July 1	N/A	The National Telecommunications Commission issued an alias cease and desist order on ABS-CBN TV Plus and Sky Direct to temporary close its broadcasting operations following the expiration of its broadcast franchise (Republic Act No. 7966 and 7969, which both granted on March 30, 1995) on May 4. Its programming was temporarily absorbed to Sky Cable's pay-per-view channel through Channel 156 (SD) / Channel 256 (HD) (Metro Manila) & Channel 56 (SD) / Channel 956 (HD) (Provincial).	
Yey!	Broadcasting channel	DTT Channel 1.04; ABS-CBN TV Plus Channel 4 (Metro Manila); Sky Direct Channel 3 (Nationwide); Sky Cable Channel 1 (Metro Manila) / Channel 109 (Provincial); Destiny Cable Channel 1 (Metro Manila)	July 1	November 6, 2021 (as a programming block via Jeepney TV and Kapamilya Channel)	The National Telecommunications Commission issued an alias cease and desist order on ABS-CBN TV Plus and Sky Direct to temporary close its broadcasting operations following the expiration of its broadcast franchise (Republic Act No. 7966 and 7969, which both granted on March 30, 1995) on May 4. Absorbed as a digital web portal under ABS-CBN Digital Media. Some programs were transferred to Kapamilya Channel beginning on September 12 (upon the launch of Just Love Kids block). Absorbed as a programming block via YeY Weekdays and YeY Weekend through Jeepney TV and Kapamilya Channel beginning on November 6, 2021.	

=== Cancelled ===
The following is a list of television stations or cable channels that have the network cancellation in 2020.

==== Planned rebrand ====
Original date	Prior rebrand	Planned rebrand	Type	Channel	Reason	Source
April 13 (1st; suspended); July 20 (2nd; cancelled)	The 5 Network	One TV (now TV5)	Broadcasting network	Channel 5 (analog feed) / Channel 18/51 (digital feed); Cignal Channel 5 (Nationwide); Sky Direct Channel 5 (Nationwide); G Sat Channel 5 (Nationwide); SatLite Channel 5 (Nationwide); Sky Cable / Destiny Cable Channel 10 (Metro Manila); Cablelink Channel 10 (Metro Manila)	Intended to be the sixth MediaQuest channel launched under the "One" branding (presently known as the "One Network Media Group"). Temporary suspension of rebranding due to the COVID-19 pandemic and the implementation of the community quarantines in the Philippines. In June 2020, it was announced that the rebrand would be pushed through on July 20. On July 4, it was officially cancelled due to the adverse reactions from the netizens and the opinions of the network's loyal viewers and fans to the upcoming rebrand with its promotions through its digital and online platforms have been removed.	

- Notes
1. ^1: via Cignal TV providers since October 21
2. ^2: via G Sat until and since July (both old and new)
3. ^3: via Sky Cable since December 14
4. ^4: via GMA Affordabox since December 12
5. ^5: via DTT since November 12
6. ^6: On June 30, Sky Direct suspend its operations due to the ABS-CBN franchise renewal controversy
7. ^7: On May 5, O Shopping ceased its broadcast due to the ABS-CBN franchise renewal controversy
8. ^8: via Sky Cable until October 7 (old); October 8−31 (new)

== Services ==
The following are a list of television operators or providers and streaming media platforms or services launches and closures in 2020.

=== Launches ===
Date	Provider	Type	Stream	Source
May 15	GagaOOLala	VOD OTT streaming media platform	N/A	
June 26	GMA Affordabox	DTT set-top device box	N/A	
June 27	KTX	VOD OTT streaming media platform	N/A	
August 1	Kapamilya Online Live	Multicasting	Facebook (ABS-CBN); YouTube (ABS-CBN Entertainment)	
September 1	Sibya TV	Multicasting	Facebook (Sibya TV)	
September 11	Just Love Kids	Multicasting	Website (ABS-CBN Entertainment)	
September 26	Smart Gigafest	VOD OTT streaming media platform	Website (Smart Communications)	
September	Filipinas: Malayang Balita	Multicasting	Facebook (Filipinas: Malayang Balita); YouTube (Filipinas: Malayang Balita)	
September	Regional News Group (RNG)	Multicasting	Facebook (Various); YouTube (Various)	
October 22	Premier Sports Asia	VOD OTT streaming media platform	N/A	
October	Alpha News Philippines	Multicasting	Facebook (Alpha News Philippines); YouTube (Alpha News Philippines)	
November 14	Upstream PH	VOD OTT streaming media platform	N/A	
December 15	VivaMax	VOD OTT streaming media platform	N/A	

=== Rebranded ===
The following is a list of streaming providers that have made or will make noteworthy service rebrands in 2020.

Date	Rebranded from	Rebranded to	Type	Stream	Source
August 12	Star Music Kids	TuTuBee	Multicasting	YouTube (TuTuBee)	
September 1	iWant	iWantTFC	VOD OTT streaming media platform	N/A	
September 1	Sky On Demand	iWantTFC	VOD OTT streaming media platform	N/A	
September 1	TFC Online	iWantTFC	VOD OTT streaming media platform	N/A	
October	iflix	WeTV iflix	VOD OTT streaming media platform	N/A	
October	WeTV	WeTV iflix	VOD OTT streaming media platform	N/A	

=== Closures ===
Date	Provider	Type	Stream	Sign-on debut	Source
April 1	DisneyLife	VOD OTT streaming media platform	N/A	May 25, 2018	
April 1	Fox+	VOD OTT streaming media platform	N/A	March 7, 2017	
April 30	HOOQ	VOD OTT streaming media platform	N/A	February 5, 2015	
June 30	ABS-CBN TV Plus Go	DTT USB OTG mobile dongle stick	N/A	June 1, 2019	
June 30	Sky Direct	DTH broadcast satellite television provider	N/A	March 18, 2016	

=== Stopped operating ===
The following is a list of providers and platforms or services that have stopped operating or streaming in 2020.

Provider	Type	Stream	Last operating	Resumed operating	Reason	Source
ABS-CBN TV Plus	DTT set-top device box	N/A	June 30	May 2022 (as ABS-CBN TV Plus Digital TV Receiver for relaunch packaging of unsold units to a regular DTT set-top device box)	The National Telecommunications Commission issued an alias cease and desist order on ABS-CBN TV Plus to temporary close its broadcasting operations following the expiration of its broadcast franchise (Republic Act No. 7966, which was granted on March 30, 1995) on May 4. It resumed operations in May 2022 as ABS-CBN TV Plus Digital TV Receiver.	

==== Miscellaneous ====
Provider	Type	Stream	Last operating	Resumed operating	Reason	Source
TAP Go	VOD OTT streaming media platform	N/A	November 23	April 27, 2021 (initial); July 5, 2021 (official)	Temporary suspension of operations due to their system maintenance.	

== Deaths ==
January

- January 14 – Twink Macaraig, (b. 1964), news anchor.

March

- March 26 – Menggie Cobarrubias, (b. 1951), actor.
- March 30 – Rolando Valdueza, (b. 1960), Chief Financial Officer of ABS-CBN Corporation.

April

- April 9 – Leila Benitez-McCollum, (b. 1930), former TV and radio personality.

May

- May 4 – Babajie, (b. 1984), comedian.
- May 10 – Sonny Parsons, (b. 1958), actor and singer.

June

- June 10 – Anita Linda, (b. 1924), veteran film and TV actress.

July

- July 13 – Kim Idol, (b. 1979), comedian.

August

- August 4 – Eddie Ilarde, (b. 1934), former TV and radio host.
- August 8 – Alfredo Lim, (b. 1929), former TV and radio host.
- August 10 – Neil Ocampo, (b. 1958), veteran radio anchorman and news reporter.

October

- October 10 – Rev. Fr. Sonny Ramirez, OP, (b. 1945), spiritual adviser and former host of Sharing in the City.
- October 24 – Al Quinn, (b. 1933), veteran TV director.

November

- November 20 – Ricky Velasco, (b. 1959), former ABS-CBN News and DZMM reporter.
- November 29 – April Boy Regino, (b. 1961), musician and actor.

== See also ==
- 2020 in television
