= List of programs broadcast by DZBB =

These are the programs aired on DZBB, the flagship AM station of GMA Network in Metro Manila. Selected programs are also simultaneously broadcast via its television counterpart Dobol B TV block on GTV.

== Current programs ==
=== News commentary, issues, politics ===
- Ano'ng Say N'yo? (2018–present)
- Bigtime Balita (2001–present)
- Buena Manong Balita (2009–present) (Note: Also aired on Dobol B TV block on GTV (Mondays to Fridays only))
- Dobol B: Bantay Balita sa Kongreso (2020–present)
- Dobol B Insider (2021–present)
- Dobol Weng sa Dobol B (2021–present) (Note: Also aired on Dobol B TV block on GTV. (Saturdays only))
- DZBB Executive Summary (2019–present)
- Melo del Prado sa Super Radyo DZBB (2019–present)
- One on One: Walang Personalan (2021–present)
- Riding in Tandem sa Balita (2020–present)
- Saksi sa Dobol B (2000–present)
- TKO: Talakayan, Komentaryo at Opinyon (2019–present)

=== News ===
- Balitang Balita sa Dobol B (2020–present)
- Hataw sa Hapon! (2023–present)
- Markado (2020–present)
- Ratsada ng mga Balita (2006–21; 2021–23; 2025–present)
- Sunday Guwapo (2000–present)
- Super Balita (1999–present)
  - Super Balita sa Umaga Nationwide (2007–present)
  - Super Balita sa Umaga (Weekends)
  - Super Balita sa Tanghali Nationwide (2008–present)
  - Super Balita sa Tanghali (Weekends) (2014–present)
  - Super Balita sa Hapon (Daily)
  - Super Balita sa Gabi (Weekdays)
- Super Radyo DZBB Flash Report (up-to-the-minute breaking news, 1999–present)
- Super Radyo DZBB News Flash (hourly news update, 1999–present)
- Super Radyo DZBB Special Coverage (live coverage, 1999–present)
- Umaga Na, Balita Na! (2002–present)

=== Health and Lifestyle ===
- Bahay at Buhay Kasama si Lala Roque (2021–present)
- Healing Galing (2025–present)
- Pinoy M.D. sa Super Radyo DZBB (2019–present)

=== Public service and Public affairs ===
- Presinto 594 (1986–2001; 2016–present)
- SOS: Serbisyo on the Spot (2018–present)

=== Music ===
- Forever Memories (2020–22; 2023–present)
  (simulcast on Barangay LS 97.1, 1 am to 3 am on Monday to Friday (until 4 am on Saturdays), 3 am to 4 am on Sundays)
- Harana at Balita (2019–20, 2021–present)
- The "Long Tall" Howard Medina Show (2014–present)

=== Talk, Lifestyle and Magazine ===
- Usap Tayo: Super Kwentuhan with Mark and Susan (1999–2008, 2020–present)

=== Business and Consumer Advice ===
- DZBB Super Serbisyo: Trabaho at Negosyo (1999–2002; 2019–present)

=== Drama Anthology ===
- Liham ng Gabi (2026–present)
  (simulcast on Barangay LS 97.1)
- Sumasapuso (2022–present) (with replay from 12 mn to 1 am, Tuesdays to Saturdays)

=== Television programs simulcast over GMA Network ===
- 24 Oras (2004–present)
- 24 Oras Weekend (2010–present)
- Fast Talk with Boy Abunda (2023–present)
  (delayed simulcast from 5:10 pm to 5:40 pm)
- Resibo: Walang Lusot ang May Atraso (2023–present)
- Saksi (2000–present)
  (delayed broadcast from 11:30 pm to 12:00 mn)

== Previously aired programs ==
- Ako Naman (1992–97)
- Aksyon Oro Mismo (2008–14)
- Aksyon: Roco at Raul (1998–2001)
- Aldabes with Al Mendes
- Ang Inyong Kabalikat (1989–98)
- Ang Inyong Kabisig (1989–97)
- Ating Pagmasdan (1987–91)
- Balitanghali (QTV/Q simulcast) (2006–08)
- Balitanghali Weekend (Q and GMA News TV simulcast) (2010–14)
- Balita Na, Harana Pa
- Balita Oro Mismo
- Balitang Artista (1989–97)
- Balitang Panghapon (1987–89)
- Balitang Panggabi (1987–89)
- Balitang Todo-Todo (2011–19)
- Bantay sa Balita (1990–1999)
- Bangon na, Bayan! (1999–2020; 2022–24)
  - Editoryal ng Bayan
- Bantayog sa Araw
- Barangay Love Stories (2020–22)
- Bidang-Bida (1995–99)
- Bidang-Bida sa Dobol B (2019–20)
  - Dear BB Presents
  - ASAL: Ang Sa Akin Lang
  - Da Hu?
- Bisig Bayan Network Balita (1989–99)
  - Morning
  - Midday
  - Afternoon
  - Weekend
- Bisitang Artista (1975–89)
- Buhay at Kalusugan (2007–12)
- Buhay-Buhay (2018–2020)
- Boses ng Balita (2011–21)
- Boses N'yo Sa Senado (1987–92)
- Break Muna Tayo!
- Brigada Siete
  - Radio edition
  - GMA Network simulcast (1996–2001)
- Camay Theater of the Air (1950–72)
- Cathay Broadcasting (Chinese language radio program)
- Cayetano in Action with Boy Abunda (2025)
- CelebriTV (GMA Network simulcast) (2015–16)
- Chevrolet Sunday Concert Hour (1965–72)
- Compañero y Compañera (1998–2000)
- Dis is Manolo (1980–2020)
- Dear Dobol B (2020–22)
- Doble Banda (1998–2001)
- Dobol A sa Dobol B (1998–2008; 2014–20)
- Dobol B: Balitang Balita (2008–20)
- Dobol B: Bantay Balita sa Kamara (2019–20)
- Dobol B: Bantay Balita sa Senado (2019–20)
- Dobol E sa Dobol B (1995–2002)
- Easy-Easy Lang! (2014–19)
- Eskuwelahang Munti (1952–63)
- Espie Espesyal with Espie Fabon
- Eye to Eye (Radio edition)
- Face The Facts
- Francis "Kiko" Flores on Board (2019–21)
- Frontpage: Ulat ni Mel Tiangco (GMA Network simulcast) (2002–04)
- GMA Balita (GMA Network simulcast) (1990–95)
- Golden Memories (2022–23)
- Gulong ng Palad
- Headline Balita (2017–23)
- Harana Na, Balita Pa! (2007–19)
- Helen of Joy (1974–1979)
- HOT T.V. (GMA Network simulcast) (2012–2l13)
- Ikaw Na Ba? (A special radio program for elections)
  - The RGMA Presidential Interview (2010; 2016; 2022)
  - The RGMA Vice-Presidential Interview (2010; 2016; 2022)
  - The RGMA Senatorial Interview (2013; 2019)
- Ilaw ng Tahanan (radio drama)
- I M Ready sa Dobol B (2017–21) (Became a segment of Super Balita sa Umaga Saturday Edition)
- In Touch with Dr. Charles Stanley (2001–04)
- Inday ng Buhay Ko (1981–96)
- Isyu ATBP. (2019–20) (Became a segment of Super Balita sa Umaga Saturday Edition)
- Isyu ng Bayan (2003–15)
- Jimmy Gil Live! (2002–21)
- Kahapon Lamang (1975–89)
- Kahapon Lamang Ngayon (1990–98)
- Kahapon Lamang sa Dobol B (2008–20)
- Kapwa Ko Mahal Ko (Radio edition)
- Kape at Balita (1991–93)
- Kay Susan Tayo! sa Super Radyo DZBB (2010–14; 2019–20)
- Komedya Musikal (1957)
- Konsyumer Atbp. (2020–24)
- Kuro-Kuro ni Sen. Soc Rodrigo (1964)
- Kwentong Kutsero (1956–57)
- Ladies' Room (2002–19)
- La Tondena Amateur Hour (1950–61)
- Liwanag sa Balita (2006–22; 2024)
- Lovingly Yours, Helen (1979–84; 1986–92)
- Lucky Telephone (1950–59)
- Manang Rose / Super Kalusugan (1976–2015)
- Maskara (Radio drama)
- Master Showman sa Dobol B (1997–2016)
- Mel and Joey (GMA Network simulcast) (2004–11)
- Metro Balita (1992–98)
- Mr. Kariñoso (2000–18)
- Mr. Paminsan-minsan
- Mr. Public Service (1990–98)
- MX3 Health Watch (2015–21)
- MX3 Prayer Watch: Oras ng Panalangin (produced by DMI-MX3)
- One on One with Igan kasama si Lala Roque (2008–14)
- Nagmamahal, Manay Gina (2003–09)
- Natural Kay Orly at Fernan Na! (2012–13)
- News and Commentary (2015–19)
- Newscoop (1955–72)
  - Morning
  - Afternoon
  - Evening
  - Weekend
- OMJ: Oh My Job (2020–22)
- Pacquiao's Fights on Radio (2007–19, 2021)
- Pag-Usapan Natin
- Partners Mel and Jay (GMA Network simulcast) (1996–2004)
  - Partners Mel & Jay sa Dobol B (1996–98)
- Patibong: MPD in Action (1981–88)
- Perlas ng Silanganan with Ric de la Rosa
- Philippine Agenda (2007)
- Pira-Pirasong Pangarap (1998–2003)
- Press It, Win It (2010)
- Pusong Wagi
- Radyo Romantiko (2019–24)
- Radyo Taliba (1974–87)
- Ricky D' Great Show (1983–92)
- Round Up Kasama si Orly Trinidad (2020–24)
  - MMDA sa GMA (Fused into segment every Friday nights) (2003–22; 2022–24)
  - Weekend Round Up (2021–24)
- Sabado Nights (2000–17)
- Sa Banda Rine (1986–89)
- Sa Bawat Sandali (1982–2000)
- Saksi (Radio drama)
- Sandali Po Lamang (1973–91)
- Sa Totoo Lang (1991–2007)
- Say Mo, Say Ko, Say N'yo! (2011–19)
- Señor Balita (1989–99)
- S-Files (GMA Network simulcast) (2005–07)
- Showbiz Central (GMA Network simulcast) (2007–12)
- Sino? (2018–20) (Fused back into a segment of Saksi sa Dobol B)
  - Jeng Jeng
  - Balitawit
  - Public Apology
- Si Susan Na, Si Arnell Pa! (2008–10)
- Spin It, Win It! (2010)
- Startalk (GMA Network simulcast) (2005–13)
- Student Canteen (GMA Network simulcast)
- Super Balita Hatinggabi Edition (1999–2006)
- Super Balita Panghapunan (1999–2000)
- Super Balita sa Gabi Weekend (1999–2019)
- Super Balita Tanghalian Edition (1999–2006)
- Super Igme (1999–2002)
- Super Kalusugan (2019–20)
- Super Kuyang (1999–2019)
- Super Radyo Nationwide (2000–20)
- Super Radyo Nobela (2020–22)
- Super Tambalan (2016–18)
- Tagalog News (1950–55)
- Tempos Latinos
- Talk to Mama Emma (2018–20)
- Tanghalan ng Kampeon (GMA Network simulcast) (1988–93)
- Tanong ng Bayan (1995–2016)
- Tapatan with Jay Sonza (Radio edition) (1996–2000)
- Tawag ng Tanghalan (originally known as Purico Amateur Hour) (1950–53)
- Tawag-Pansin (1986–95)
- Tayo'y Mag-aliw with Paeng Yabut (1957–95)
- The Jessica Soho's Presidential Interviews (Eleksyon 2022) (GMA Network simulcast) (January 22, 2022)
- The Secret of Health (2023–24, produced by Yes2Health, Inc.)
- Tinig ng Mamayanan
- Tugon at Aksyon
- Walang Siyesta! (The Badingdings) (2016–19)
- Window to The World
- Words and Music
- W Dobol Team (2020–21)

== See also ==
- Super Radyo DZBB 594
- GMA News
