= 2008 in radio =

Several events occurred in radio in 2008.

== Events ==
- February 11: The Bosnian commercial Islamic radio station Radio BIR begins broadcasting from Sarajevo.
- February 23: FM Hatsukaichi begins broadcasting in the Chūgoku region of Japan.
- March 1: ADN Radio Chile, a sports and news service, begins broadcasting on 91.7 MHz FM from Santiago.
- June 1: The eXpat Chart is launched on 4 English-language radio stations across Europe.
- November 1: Big 106.2 is launched in Auckland, New Zealand.
- date unknown: Iraqi public radio station Aredo FM begins broadcasting from Baghdad.

== Debuts ==
- February 11: One on One with Igan, a Philippine weekday morning radio show, is launched, replacing Dobol A sa Dobol B. (See Endings.)
- May 12: Super Balita sa Tanghali Nationwide, the midday newscast of DZBB in the Philippines, begins its run.
- December 13: Musikhjälpen, Swedish radio charity appeal

== Endings ==
- January 30: Dobol A sa Dobol B, a Philippine weekday morning radio show, ends its first run, to be replaced by Morning Talk with Arnold Clavio.

== Deaths ==
- January 16: Frank Shozo Baba, Japanese American radio broadcaster, 93
- February 10: Inga Nielsen, Danish soprano and radio performer, 61 (cancer)
- March 22: Cachao, Cuban musician and 1940s radio star with The Maravillas (La Radiofónica), 89
- July 3: Harald Heide-Steen Jr., Norwegian actor, comedian, singer and radio presenter, 68
- July 12: Tony Snow, American journalist, political commentator and anchor, 53
- July 28: Wendo Kolosoy, Congolese musician, 83
- August 5: Reg Lindsay, Australian country singer, songwriter, multi-instrumentalist, producer and radio and television personality, 79
- August 16
  - Dorival Caymmi, Brazilian singer, songwriter, actor, painter and radio presenter, 94
  - Ronnie Drew, Irish folk musician and radio personality, 73 (16 September 1934 – 16 August 2008)
- September 2: Arne Domnérus, Swedish jazz musician, featured soloist with the Swedish Radio Big Band, 83
- September 18: Mauricio Kagel, German-Argentine composer and creator of "Hörspiel",76
- September 24: Vice Vukov, Croatian singer and politician, Eurovision entrant, 72
- September 26: Bernadette Greevy, Irish mezzo-soprano, winner of a 1978 Jacob's Award for her performance in a radio concert, 68
