= Bangon na, Bayan! =

Philippine morning radio program

- Genre: News reports, news commentary/analysis, public affairs, current events
- Running time: 30 minutes
- Country of origin: Philippines
- Home station: Super Radyo DZBB 594, GTV-27
- Hosted by: Joel Reyes Zobel; Melo Del Prado
- Created by: RGMA Network, Inc. GMA Integrated News
- Original release: January 11, 1999 – February 9, 2024
- No. of episodes: n/a (airs daily)

Bangon Na, Bayan! (transl. wake up, people!) was a Philippine radio program aired over GMA Network Inc.'s flagship radio AM station, DZBB premiered on January 11, 1999. Originally anchored by Joel Reyes Zobel, the program includes reports, commentaries, public service and listeners' participation to a social and/or political topic of the day. Zobel and Melo Del Prado currently served as the anchors. On October 2, 2023, the program has started its simulcast under Dobol B TV block on GTV and later moved to weekday mornings as a pre-program for Super Balita sa Umaga Nationwide.

The program concluded on February 9, 2024. It is unclear what the reason got the program axed as Joel Reyes Zobel later hosted Saksi sa Dobol B, with his co-partner Rowena Salvacion, which the program was originally hosted by the late Mike Enriquez, as Zobel is the substitute host of the mentioned program.

== Host ==
=== Final host ===
- Joel Reyes Zobel (1999–2020; 2022–24)
- Melo Del Prado (2023–24)

=== Final substitute hosts ===
- Orly Trinidad (substitute for Reyes Zobel or Del Prado; 2022–24)
- Rowena Salvacion (substitute for Reyes Zobel or Del Prado; 2022–24)
- Weng dela Peña (substitute for Reyes Zobel or Del Prado; 2022-24)
- Allan Gatus (substitute for Reyes Zobel or Del Prado; 2017–20; 2022–24)
- Carlo Mateo (substitute for Reyes Zobel or Del Prado; 2022–24)
- Henry Atuelan (substitute for Reyes Zobel or Del Prado; 2023–24)

== Segments ==
- Pasada ng mga Balita – sometimes known as "Bangon na, Bayan! News Bullets", a daily recap of the hottest and biggest news for the past 12 hours
- Unang Sigwada ng mga Balita – featuring reports from the Super Radyo Reportorial Team
- Bangon na, Bayan! Calendar of Events – a quick recap of events happened on the same date in the history of the world.
- Boses ng Bayan Poll for the Day – featuring the hottest issue to be discussed in all throughout the broadcast of the show for the day.
- Editoryal ng Bayan – featuring Joel Reyes Zobel's personal opinion about the issue for the day.

== See also ==
- GMA Integrated News
- Super Radyo DZBB 594
