= 2003 in Philippine television =

The following is a list of events affecting Philippine television in 2003. Events listed include television show debuts, finales, cancellations, and channel launches, closures and rebrandings, as well as information about controversies and carriage disputes.

== Events ==
=== February ===
- February 22 – ABS-CBN formally commenced the simulcast of its daytime shows on the UHF channel Studio 23 starting with the pilot episode of the noontime show Masayang Tanghali Bayan.

=== March ===
- March 1 – Sarah Geronimo was hailed as the Star for a Night grand champion.

=== June ===
- June 14 – GMA Network celebrated its 53rd anniversary via a star-studded TV special, Very Very GMA, which was taped as live at the Araneta Coliseum.

=== July ===
- July 10 – STAR has announced that it will not renew its brand licensing and joint venture agreement with the multinational conglomerate Viva Communications under the Viva Cinema movie channel, when Viva Cinema ceased airing on July 31.
- July 28 – STAR confirmed that Viva Cinema will shut down entirely on July 31, citing financial losses.
- July 31 – After seven years of broadcast, Viva Cinema ceased operations on Thursday evening.

=== August ===
- August 1 – Viva Networks was formed and Pinoy Box Office was launched.

=== September ===
- September 24 – In an interview on TV Patrol, Kris Aquino, revealed that she incurred a sexually transmitted disease and that she feared for her life when she had a heated argument with her former lover Joey Marquez.

=== October ===
- October 23 – ABS-CBN Broadcasting Corporation celebrates the 50th anniversary of Philippine television and the 50th anniversary of ABS-CBN which unveils the "Kapamilya" branding.

=== November ===
- November 11 – Rowena Culob won the jackpot prize of one million pesos on Eat Bulaga!'s Laban o Bawi

=== Unknown ===
- Unknown – ABS-CBN launched ABS-CBNnow!, an internet-based video-on-demand service featuring ABS-CBN programs primarily targeting the Overseas Filipino Workers across the globe.

== Premieres ==
Date	Show
January 6	Ultraman Cosmos on Net 25
January 13	Altagracia on ABS-CBN 2
January 20	Twin Stars on GMA 7
January 27	Ángela on GMA 7
February 1	Dragon Ball GT on GMA 7
February 3	Teysi on ABS-CBN 2
February 10	OPTV on RPN 9
February 14	Survivor: The Amazon on Studio 23
February 15	Sabado Barkada on ABS-CBN TV-4 Bacolod
February 17	Knockout on GMA 7
February 17	Islands Life on RPN 9
February 22	Masayang Tanghali Bayan on ABS-CBN 2
February 23	PBA on NBN/IBC on NBN 4 and IBC 13
February 24	Nagmamahal, Manay Gina on GMA 7
February 24	Daimos on GMA 7
March 3	Darating ang Umaga on ABS-CBN 2
March 3	Harsh Realm on RPN 9
March 4	Game Channel on IBC 13
March 8	Amazing Twins on IBC 13
March 17	Final Fantasy: Unlimited on ABS-CBN 2
March 17	Slam Dunk on GMA 7
March 22	RPN News Update on RPN 9
March 22	S2: Showbiz Sabado on ABS-CBN 2
March 29	Iyo Ang Katarungan on IBC 13
April 4	Hour of Power on IBC 13
April 14	Ang Iibigin ay Ikaw Pa Rin on GMA 7
April 21	Crush Gear Turbo on ABS-CBN 2
April 21	Gata Salvaje on ABS-CBN 2
April 25	Joe Millionaire on Studio 23
April 25	The Dead Zone on RPN 9
April 28	Dora the Explorer on GMA 7
April 28	Cerge for Truth on RPN 9
April 29	Madam Ratsa Live! on RPN 9
April 29	Blue's Clues on GMA 7
April 30	Nuts Entertainment on GMA 7
April 30	Prangkahan on RPN 9
May 1	Dee's Day on RPN 9
May 2	A Second Look on RPN 9
May 3	RPN Forum on RPN 9
May 5	Cooking Master Boy on ABS-CBN 2
May 5	Meteor Garden on ABS-CBN 2
May 9	Private I on ABS-CBN 2
May 10	Kontrobersyal on ABS-CBN 2
May 11	Alias on Studio 23
May 19	Shaman King on GMA 7
May 19	Sana'y Wala Nang Wakas on ABS-CBN 2
May 22	Celebrity DAT Com on IBC 13
May 26	Basta't Kasama Kita on ABS-CBN 2
May 28	Give Us This Day on ACQ-KBN 43 Davao
May 31	Buttercup on ABS-CBN 2
June 9	Narito ang Puso Ko on GMA 7
June 9	My MVP Valentine on GMA 7
June 11	CSI: Crime Scene Investigation on Studio 23
June 16	Birds of Prey on Studio 23
June 16	Rosalinda on GMA 7
June 21	Search for a Star on GMA 7
June 23	Poor Prince on GMA 7
June 28	Kidcetera on IBC 13
June 30	Lavender on GMA 7
July 9	Bright Girl on GMA 7
July 13	Love to Love on GMA 7
July 14	Alice in Wonderland on GMA 7
July 14	Hawak Ko ang Langit on GMA 7
July 25	Thieves on Studio 23
July 28	Meteor Rain on ABS-CBN 2
July 28	ABS-CBN Insider on ABS-CBN 2
August 9	Super Gals on ABS-CBN 2
August 9	Tara Tena on ABS-CBN 2
August 9	Meteor Garden II on ABS-CBN 2
August 16	Home Along da Airport on ABS-CBN 2
August 17	Ang Tanging Ina on ABS-CBN 2
August 18	Por ti on ABS-CBN 2
August 18	Baki the Grappler on GMA 7
August 25	The Agency on RPN 9
August 25	Endless Love: Autumn in My Heart on GMA 7
August 28	Dong Puno Live on ABS-CBN 2
September 1	Daisy Siete on GMA 7
September 1	Extra Challenge on GMA 7
September 1	Zoids on GMA 7
September 3	Special Assignment on ABS-CBN 2
September 15	Project Arms on ABS-CBN 2
September 15	My Love, Cindy on GMA 7
September 15	Secretly In Love on GMA 7
September 19	Survivor: Pearl Islands on Studio 23
September 22	Katri, Ang Batang Pastol on GMA 7
September 22	Love Scar on ABS-CBN 2
September 22	Beautiful Days on GMA 7
September 24	Next Level Na! Game Ka Na Ba? on ABS-CBN 2
September 29	Marmalade Boy on GMA 7
October 4	Super Yoyo on GMA 7
October 4	May Puso ang Batas on RPN 9
October 5	SpongeBob SquarePants on Studio 23
October 6	Yu-Gi-Oh! Duel Monsters on ABS-CBN 2
October 6	Combat Missions on Studio 23
October 14	Fastlane on Studio 23
October 20	Lagot Ka, Isusumbong Kita on GMA 7
October 20	Twin Hearts on GMA 7
October 21	All Together Now on GMA 7
October 27	StarStruck on GMA 7
November 2	Girls Marching On! on ABS-CBN 2
November 3	Eternity: A Chinese Ghost Story on ABS-CBN 2
November 7	Mutant X on Studio 23
November 8	Simpleng Hiling on ABS-CBN 2
November 8	Star in a Million on ABS-CBN 2
November 8	Celebrity Turns with Junee and Lani on GMA 7
November 10	Walang Hanggan on GMA 7
November 12	8 Simple Rules on RPN 9
November 12	Scrubs on RPN 9
November 16	Captain Fatz on GMA 7
November 17	Funny Wild Girl on GMA 7
November 17	Retro TV on IBC 13
November 17	Meteor Fever in Manila on ABS-CBN 2
November 17	Endless Love: Winter Sonata on GMA 7
November 17	At the Dolphin Bay on GMA 7
November 17	Maria del Carmen on GMA 7
November 22	Victim on ABS-CBN 2
November 30	Shaider on GMA 7
November 30	Kay Susan Tayo! on GMA 7
December 1	My Annette on GMA 7
December 1	Lady Lady on ABS-CBN 2
December 1	Christmas from the Heart on ACQ-KBN 43 Davao
December 2	Bio Data on GMA 7
December 8	Astro Boy on ABS-CBN 2
December 8	It Might Be You on ABS-CBN 2

=== Unknown date ===
- January: All My Love on GMA 7
- February: All About You on GMA 7
- June: Lakas Magsasaka on GMA 7
- August:
  - Tabatina on GMA 7
  - The Misadventures of Maverick and Ariel on ABC 5

=== Unknown ===
- Dial M on NBN 4
- Unlimited Diving on NBN 4
- Magbuhay Professional on NBN 4
- Problema N'yo, Sagot Ko! on NBN 4
- BIDA: Batang Iwas Droga on NBN 4
- Divine Mercy Live TV Mass on NBN 4
- Problema Nyo, Sagot Ko! on NBN 4 and ABC 5
- Search for Tanduay The No.1 Rhum Billard Player on NBN 4
- Kingdom Upclose on ACQ-KBN 43 Davao
- RJ Sunday Jam on RJTV 29
- Blazin' RnB on RJTV 29
- RJ Penthouse on RJTV 29
- Tipong Pinoy on Studio 23
- Detek Kids on ABS-CBN 2
- Buhay Pelota on SBN 21
- Friends Again on SBN 21
- Jai-Alai Games on SBN 21
- Saklolo Abugado on NBN 4
- Mirai Sentai Timeranger on ABS-CBN 2
- Dong Puno Tonight on ABS-CBN 2
- Gourmet Everyday on ABC 5
- Look Who's Talking on ABC 5
- Pops Talk Show on ABC 5
- Crayon Shin-chan on ABC 5
- Tutubi Patrol on ABC 5
- Viva Box Office on ABC 5
- Mon Colle Knights on ABC 5
- The New Adventures of Robin Hood on ABC 5
- I-Barangay Mo! on IBC 13
- Pilipinas Ngayon on IBC 13
- Entrepinoy Start-Up on IBC 13
- BYK101 on IBC 13
- Bitag on IBC 13
- LakbayTV on IBC 13
- AM @ IBC on IBC 13
- Global Family Series on IBC 13
- Japan Video Topics on IBC 13
- Home Shopping Network on RPN 9
- Luks Family on RPN 9
- Magandang Morning Philippines! on RPN 9
- What's Up 'day! on RPN 9
- Kids To Go on RPN 9
- Direct Line on RPN 9
- The Imelda Papin Show on RPN 9
- Ratsada Balita on RPN 9
- Ugnayang Pambansa on RPN 9
- Cathedral of Praise on RPN 9
- Friends Again on RPN 9
- Jesus The Healer on RPN 9
- Kerygma TV on RPN 9
- Fistorama on RPN 9
- Golf Power on RPN 9
- In This Corner on RPN 9
- Largo on RPN 9
- John Doe on RPN 9
- Madam Ratsa Live! on RPN 9
- NBA Jam on RPN 9
- Carita de Ángel on RPN 9
- Por un beso on RPN 9
- Luisa on ABS-CBN 2
- Solita Mi Amor on ABS-CBN 2
- George Shrinks on GMA 7
- The Berenstain Bears on GMA 7
- Kakabakaba Adventures on GMA 7
- Let’s Go on GMA 7
- Monster Rancher on GMA 7
- Virtua Fighter on GMA 7
- Doraemon on GMA 7
- Magic Knight Rayearth on GMA 7
- Ghost in the Shell on GMA 7
- Rotten Ralph on GMA 7
- Bill and Ben on GMA 7
- Miki Loves Yuu on GMA 7
- Paulina on GMA 7
- Kachorra on GMA 7
- In Love With Angel on GMA 7
- Ghost Fighter on GMA 7
- Voltes V on GMA 7
- Doc on Radio on UNTV 37
- Hometown: Dito Po Sa Amin on UNTV 37
- Oras ng Himala on UNTV 37
- Playback on UNTV 37
- PMS on UNTV 37
- Arts.21 on Net 25
- Auto, Motor & Sport on Net 25
- Bundesliga Kick Off! on Net 25
- Captured on Net 25
- Cyberdoodoo on Net 25
- DW-TV Journal on Net 25
- Euromaxx on Net 25
- Ito ang Payo on Net 25
- Openline on Net 25
- Tomorrow Today on Net 25
- Urban Peasant on Net 25
- The Rock Of My Salvation on ZOE TV 11

== Returning or renamed programs ==
Show	Last aired	Retitled as/Season/Notes	Channel	Return date
Magandang Tanghali Bayan	2003	Masayang Tanghali Bayan	ABS-CBN	February 22
RPN NewsBreak	2003	RPN News Update	RPN 9	March 22
Arangkada Xtra Balita	2003	Arangkada Balita	RPN 9	March 24
Ang Iibigin ay Ikaw	2002	Ang Iibigin ay Ikaw Pa Rin	GMA Network	April 14
Dong Puno Live	2000	Same	ABS-CBN	August 28
Extra Extra	2003	Extra Challenge	GMA Network	September 1
Assignment	2001	Special Assignment	ABS-CBN	September 3

== Programs transferring networks ==
Date	Show	No. of seasons	Moved from	Moved to
May 11	Alias	—N/a	ABS-CBN	Studio 23
June 21	Star for a Night	—N/a	IBC	GMA Network (as Search for a Star)
October 5	SpongeBob SquarePants	—N/a	RPN	Studio 23
November 8	Philippine Basketball League	—N/a	NBN	Studio 23
November 30	Shaider	—N/a	IBC	GMA Network
Unknown	Tipong Pinoy	—N/a	GMA Network	Studio 23
Unknown	Bitag	—N/a	ABC	IBC
Unknown	Crayon Shin-chan	—N/a	IBC	ABC
Unknown	Carita de Ángel	—N/a	IBC	RPN
Unknown	Por un beso	—N/a	IBC	RPN

== Finales ==
- January 10: Recuerdo de Amor (ABS-CBN 2)
- January 14: Little Ana (GMA 7)
- January 17: Hercules (GMA 7)
- January 24: Adriana (GMA 7)
- January 31: Detective Conan (GMA 7)
- February 8: Barkadahan sa S na S (ABS-CBN TV-4 Bacolod)
- February 14:
  - Flame of Recca (GMA 7)
  - Sa Puso Ko, Iingatan Ka (ABS-CBN 2)
- February 21:
  - Magandang Tanghali Bayan (ABS-CBN 2)
  - Salomé (GMA 7)
  - Pira-pirasong Pangarap (GMA 7)
- February 22: Bitag (ABC 5)
- February 28: Sa Dulo ng Walang Hanggan (ABS-CBN 2)
- March 1: Star for a Night (IBC 13)
- March 9: The Price Is Right (ABC 5)
- March 14: Hunter × Hunter (GMA 7)
- March 15: Digimon Adventure 02 (ABS-CBN 2)
- March 21: RPN NewsBreak (RPN 9)
- March 29: Saturday Night Specials (ABC 5)
- April 11: Ang Iibigin ay Ikaw (GMA 7)
- April 22: Make Way for Noddy (GMA 7)
- April 23: Beh Bote Nga (GMA 7)
- April 25:
  - Sana ay Ikaw na Nga (GMA 7)
  - Aladdin (GMA 7)
- May 2:
  - E.T.C. (ABS-CBN 2)
  - Isyu (ABS-CBN 2)
- May 3: FPJ Action Cinema (ABS-CBN 2)
- May 12: Survivor: The Amazon (Studio 23)
- May 16: Knockout (GMA 7)
- May 23: Bituin (ABS-CBN 2)
- June 6: Kung Mawawala Ka (GMA 7)
- June 14: Mariá la Del Barrio (GMA 7)
- June 20:
  - Shaman King (GMA 7)
  - Joe Millionaire (Studio 23)
- June 22: Cheche Lazaro Presents (GMA 7)
- July 6:
  - Star Studio Presents (ABS-CBN 2)
  - Kahit Kailan (GMA 7)
- July 11:
  - Twin Stars (GMA 7)
  - María Belén (GMA 7)
- July 25:
  - Meteor Garden (ABS-CBN 2)
  - ABS-CBN Headlines (ABS-CBN 2)
- August 8: Meteor Rain (ABS-CBN 2)
- August 9: Arriba, Arriba! (ABS-CBN 2)
- August 10: Home Along Da Riles (ABS-CBN 2)
- August 15: Slam Dunk (GMA 7)
- August 18: Harsh Realm (RPN 9)
- August 21: Gus Abelgas Nag-Uulat (ABS-CBN 2)
- August 22: Ang Iibigin ay Ikaw Pa Rin (GMA 7)
- August 27: Mission X (ABS-CBN 2)
- August 29:
  - Nagmamahal, Manay Gina (GMA 7)
  - Daimos (GMA 7)
  - Lavender (GMA 7)
  - Martin Late @ Nite (ABS-CBN 2)
- August 30: Family Rosary Crusade (ABS-CBN 2)
- September 12: My MVP Valentine (GMA 7)
- September 13: S2: Showbiz Sabado (ABS-CBN 2)
- September 19:
  - Alice in Wonderland (GMA 7)
  - Poor Prince (GMA 7)
- September 23: Milyun-Milyon Na, Game KNB? (ABS-CBN 2)
- September 26: Bright Girl (GMA 7)
- October 13: Kool Ka Lang (GMA 7)
- October 14: Da Boy en Da Girl (GMA 7)
- October 17: Habang Kapiling Ka (GMA 7)
- October 19: Tabing Ilog (ABS-CBN 2)
- October 24: Endless Love: Autumn in My Heart (GMA 7)
- October 31:
  - Meteor Garden II (ABS-CBN 2)
  - Thieves (Studio 23)
- November 1:
  - Willingly Yours (ABS-CBN 2)
  - Blockbuster Cinema (GMA 7)
- November 7: Hawak Ko ang Langit (GMA 7)
- November 9: Magic Knight Rayearth (GMA 7)
- November 14:
  - Marmalade Boy (GMA 7)
  - Secretly in Love (GMA 7)
  - Rosalinda (GMA 7)
  - Darating ang Umaga (ABS-CBN 2)
  - Kay Tagal Kang Hinintay (ABS-CBN 2)
- November 15: F! (ABS-CBN 2)
- November 17: My Love, Cindy (GMA 7)
- November 23:
  - Inday Heart To Heart (GMA 7)
  - Hiraya Manawari (ABS-CBN 2)
- November 25: The Probe Team (GMA 7)
- November 28: Katri, Ang Batang Pastol (GMA 7)
- November 29: Kidcetera (IBC 13)
- December 5:
  - Beautiful Days (GMA 7)
  - Meteor Fever in Manila (ABS-CBN 2)
- December 12: Lunch Break (IBC 13)
- December 13: Amazing Twins (IBC 13)
- December 14: PBA on NBN/IBC (NBN 4 and IBC 13)
- December 15: Survivor: Pearl Islands (Studio 23)

=== Unknown date ===
- January:
  - Ecomoda (ABS-CBN 2)
  - Betty La Fea (GMA 7)
- August: All My Love (GMA 7)
- September: SpongeBob SquarePants (RPN 9)

=== Unknown ===
- Paloma (ABS-CBN 2)
- Romantica (ABS-CBN 2)
- Daniela (ABS-CBN 2)
- Altagracia (ABS-CBN 2)
- Cristina (ABS-CBN 2)
- Citiline (Studio 23)
- Amazing Lifestyle (SBN 21)
- Jai-Alai Games (SBN 21)
- Blazin' RnB (RJTV 29)
- Pinoy Wrestling Reloaded (RJTV 29)
- RJ Penthouse (RJTV 29)
- PLDT Playtym (GMA 7)
- Ready, Txt, Go! (GMA 7)
- Sesame Street (GMA 7)
- Charlotte (GMA 7)
- MariMar (GMA 7)
- George Shrinks (GMA 7)
- Ángela (GMA 7)
- Dragon Ball Z (GMA 7)
- Strangebrew (UNTV 37)
- Kakabakaba (GMA 7)
- Sonic Underground (GMA 7)
- Pokémon (GMA 7)
- Gadget Boy (GMA 7)
- Rotten Ralph (GMA 7)
- Bill and Ben (GMA 7)
- Mojacko (GMA 7)
- Doraemon (GMA 7)
- The Berenstain Bears (GMA 7)
- Ghost in the Shell (GMA 7)
- Baki the Grappler (GMA 7)
- Zoids (GMA 7)
- Task Force Siyasat (ABC 5)
- Chinese Variety Show (ABC 5)
- Pygmalio (ABC 5)
- Fancy Lala (ABC 5)
- F (ABC 5)
- Infochat (ABC 5)
- Urban Doktor (ABC 5)
- Biker Mice from Mars (ABC 5)
- Laser Patrol (ABC 5)
- Life with Roger (ABC 5)
- Mon Colle Knights (ABC 5)
- Poltergeist: The Legacy (ABC 5)
- Star Trek: Voyager (ABC 5)
- Starcom: The U.S. Space Force (ABC 5)
- Two (ABC 5)
- Pet Ko! (GMA 7)
- Batang Batibot (GMA 7)
- Disney Adventures (GMA 7)
- Off the Record (ABS-CBN 2)
- Myx sa Dos (ABS-CBN 2)
- Smart Amazing Dreams (ABS-CBN 2)
- Dong Puno Nightly (ABS-CBN 2)
- Klasmeyts (ABS-CBN 2)
- I-Barangay Mo! (IBC 13)
- People First (IBC 13)
- Nora Mismo (IBC 13)
- Trash en Traffic (IBC 13)
- Pilipinas Ngayon (IBC 13)
- The Finest Hour (IBC 13)
- Sinemaks (IBC 13)
- Viva Box Office (IBC 13)
- Hour of Power (IBC 13)
- Carita de Ángel (IBC 13)
- Por un beso (IBC 13)
- Akazukin Chacha (IBC 13)
- Crayon Shin-chan (IBC 13)
- Cyborg Kuro-chan (IBC 13)
- Beyblade (ABS-CBN 2)
- Sakura Wars (ABS-CBN 2)
- Final Fantasy: Unlimited (ABS-CBN 2)
- Crush Gear Turbo (ABS-CBN 2)
- Cooking Master Boy (ABS-CBN 2)
- Super Gals (ABS-CBN 2)
- Project Arms (ABS-CBN 2)
- Yu-Gi-Oh! Duel Monsters (ABS-CBN 2)
- Luks Family (RPN 9)
- Match TV (RPN 9)
- Metro TV (RPN 9)
- Side Stitch (RPN 9)
- In3 (RPN 9)
- Carita de Ángel (RPN 9)
- Por un beso (RPN 9)
- Eskwela ng Bayan (NBN 4)
- Business News (NBN 4)
- Explore with Mike (NBN 4)
- imGAME (NBN 4)
- Task Force Siyasat (NBN 4, ABC 5)
- Tele-Kusina (NBN 4)
- The Hour of Great Mercy (NBN 4)
- Love Scar (ABS-CBN 2)
- E! News Live (E! Philippines)
- Wild On! (E! Philippines)
- Extreme Close Up (E! Philippines)
- Mysteries and Scandals (E! Philippines)
- Fashion Emergency (E! Philippines)
- CBS Evening News (E! Philippines)
- Late Show With David Letterman (E! Philippines)
- Mariú (ZOE TV 11)
- Car Guys (Net 25)
- Computer Chronicles (Net 25)
- Extended Play (Net 25)
- Noli Me Tangere (Net 25)
- Pilot Guides (Net 25)
- Popular Mechanics for Kids (Net 25)
- The New Yankee Workshop (Net 25)
- World Report Early Edition (Net 25)
- ZDTV News (Net 25)

== Channels ==
=== Launches ===
- May 1: Prime Channel
- August 1: Pinoy Box Office

==== Unknown ====
- GKTV 3/PCTV 3
- Real Cebu Television

=== Closures ===
Date	Branding	Channel	Sign-on debut	Source
March 1	Viva TV on IBC 13	13	February 6, 2000	
June 1	RMN TV-31/E! Philippines 31	31	October 31, 1993 (as CTV-31)	
July 31	Viva Cinema		May 6, 1996	

== Births ==
- February 14 – Zephanie Dimaranan, actress and singer
- March 2 – AZ Martinez, actress and beauty queen
- March 6 –
  - Jehramae Trangia, singer
  - Shanelle Agustin, actress
- March 12 –
  - Andrea Brillantes, actress
  - Josh Ford, actor
- March 25 – Yen Quirante, actress
- March 31 – Carl Acosta, actor and dancer
- May 13 – Rita Gaviola, actress
- June 19 – Gwen Apuli, actress and singer
- June 20 – Kyle Echarri, singer and actor
- July 13 – Stacey Sevilleja, singer
- August 19 – Harvey Bautista, actor
- September 13 – Ashley Del Mundo, actress
- October 13 – Ar Angel Aviles, actress
- October 22 – Lie Reposposa, singer and actress
- November 8 – Mikha Lim, singer and actress
- November 22 – Reign Parani, actress
- November 23 – Allen Ansay, actor
- December 3 – Matthew Uy, actor
- December 27 – Louise Abuel, actor

== Deaths ==
- March 23 – Amado Cortez, former actor and diplomat (born 1928)
- April 9 – Rod Navarro, former TV host, actor, and radio commentator (born 1936)
- July 18 – César Ramírez, former actor and father of the late Ace Vergel (born 1929)
- July 19 –
  - Oscar Moreno, former actor and father of Boots Anson-Roa (born 1921)
  - Vic Vargas, former actor (born 1939)
- September 26 – Inday Badiday, Filipino host and journalist who was known as Philippine television's "queen of showbiz talk shows" and "queen of intrigues" (born 1944)
- November 14 – Carding Castro, former singer-comedian and singing comic duo Reycard Duet (born 1935)
- December 5 – Fred Montilla, former actor (born 1919)
- December 29 – Miko Sotto, former young actor and son of actress Ali Sotto (born 1982)

== See also ==
- 2003 in television
