= Sumasapuso =

Philippine radio drama program

- Title card
- Other names: Sumasapuso: Kasama si Toni Aquino
- Genre: Radio drama
- Running time: 90 minutes
- Country of origin: Philippines
- Language: Tagalog
- Home station: Super Radyo DZBB
- Hosted by: Toni Aquino
- Original release: March 28, 2022 – present

Sumasapuso (stylized as SumasaPuso) is a Philippine radio drama program broadcast by Super Radyo DZBB. Hosted by Toni Aquino, it premiered on March 28, 2022.

The program is stremaing online on YouTube, Spotify, and the official GMA Network radio streaming website.

== Overview ==
Sumasapuso premiered on March 28, 2022, airing Mondays to Fridays originally from 12:30 PM to 2:30 PM timeslot, on Super Radyo DZBB. The program blends elements of AM and FM radio formats by combining storytelling, dramatization, and popular music, with Toni Aquino reading letters from listeners and presenting real-life inspired stories accompanied by songs. It also incorporates short news updates.

In November 2022, the program was given a Special Citation for Best Entertainment Program at the 44th Catholic Mass Media Awards, marking its first industry acknowledgment.

On January 23, 2023, the program was reduced from 120 minutes to 90 minutes (12:30 PM to 2:00 PM) due to the new DZBB timeslot for Fast Talk with Boy Abunda.

In November 2023, the program received recognition at the 45th Catholic Mass Media Awards (CMMA), where it won in the Best Drama Program category. It later went on to win Best Radio Drama Program at both the 45th and 46th CMMA in 2024.

For its second anniversary in 2024, Sumasapuso featured a special episode titled "Hanggang sa Dulo", in which DZBB anchors—including Arnold Clavio, Orly Trinidad, Rowena Salvacion, Lala Roque, Connie Sison, and Weng dela Peña—provided the voices for the drama, with Toni Aquino guiding the performance.

In 2025, Sumasapuso expanded its reach through digital platforms with the release of its official podcast on Spotify, allowing audiences to listen to its episodes on demand.

In October 2025, Toni Aquino was awarded Best AM Radio Female Personality for her work on Sumasapuso at the Alta Media Icon Awards.

== Accolades ==
Accolades received by Sumasapuso
Year	Award	Category	Recipient	Result	Ref.
2022	44th Catholic Mass Media Awards	Special Citation: Best Entertainment Program	Sumasapuso	Won	
2023	45th Catholic Mass Media Awards	Best Drama Program	Sumasapuso	Won	
2024	46th Catholic Mass Media Awards	Best Radio Drama Program	Sumasapuso	Won	
2025	Alta Media Icon Awards	Best AM Radio Female Personality	Toni Aquino	Won	
