= Dobol A sa Dobol B =

Philippine weekday morning radio show

- Title card used during Dobol B sa News TV telecast from 2017 until 2020
- Genre: Political satire; Public affairs; News analysis; Commentary
- Running time: 60 minutes (9:00 am – 10:00 am)
- Country of origin: Philippines
- Home station: Super Radyo DZBB 594; GMA News TV
- Hosted by: Arnold Clavio; Ali Sotto
- Original release: First run: June 8, 1998 – January 30, 2008; Second run: January 13, 2014 – December 31, 2020
- Opening theme: "Dobol A sa Dobol B" by Dennis Garcia

Dobol A sa Dobol B (transl. double A on double B) was a Philippine weekday morning radio show hosted by Arnold Clavio and Ali Sotto. It was aired over DZBB-AM in Metro Manila, the flagship AM radio station of GMA Network. The program was also shown live as a part of Dobol B sa News TV simulcast on GMA News TV.

== Background ==
The program's title comes from the hosts names and the station's (DZBB) call sign letters. Prior to Dobol A, Clavio worked as a correspondent for the radio station DWIZ as a senate reporter. In 1988, he joined GMA Network, doing voice-over for news segments before eventually becoming a reporter. He was offered to co-host his first radio program alongside Sotto, fresh from her three-year stint as host of Katok Mga Misis! on GMA Network in 1998. During the show's first run, the program originally aired on 2 hours (from 8:00 am to 10:00 am). The program won a Golden Dove Award for Outstanding Public Affairs Program from the Kapisanan ng mga Brodkaster ng Pilipinas in 1999.

Upon Sotto's departure from the program in 2008, it was replaced by Morning Talk with Arnold Clavio, and later, One on One with Igan, which was hosted by Clavio and GMA News reporter Lala Roque.

It returned on January 13, 2014, as part of the revitalized programming of Super Radyo DZBB. As the radio program returned, it was shortened to 1 hour and instead starting at 10:00 am. Listeners of the show are referred to as "Jeng-Jengers", although"Text populi" was used during its first run.

On April 24, 2017, the program began its simulcast on television on GMA News TV under the Dobol B sa News TV block.

The second run of the program silently ended its broadcast on December 31, 2020, weeks after Ali Sotto left the network due to some issues regarding her status in the radio station. She even made an appearance on Eat Bulaga!'s "Bawal Judgmental" segment in the midst of her absence in the radio program. During its last episodes, Clavio was accompanied by Rowena Salvacion and Kathy San Gabriel as Sotto's substitute anchor. On January 4, 2021, the network revived the program One on One with Igan, which was renamed as One on One: Walang Personalan, hosted by Arnold Clavio and Rowena Salvacion (later on, with Connie Sison), as replacement for Dobol A.

== Hosts ==
- Arnold Clavio (1998–2008; 2014–20)
- Ali Sotto (1998–2008; 2014–20)
- Susan Enriquez (substitute for Sotto or Clavio; 2017–20)
- Rowena Salvacion (substitute for Sotto; 2017–20)
- Orly Trinidad (substitute for Clavio; 2020)
- Kathy San Gabriel (substitute for Sotto; 2020)
- Joel Reyes Zobel (substitute for Clavio; 2020)

== Segments ==
- Starpok/Istorbo! - Showbiz segment with former Startalk host, Lolit Solis.
- Text Pabaon - Messages read on air by the hosts to conclude the program. Sotto often gives an inspirational message "Thought pabaon," while Clavio delivers a humorous message "Joke pabaon."
- Metro Manila Hataw
- Tunay na Pangbayan, Walang Personalan

== Former segments ==
- Jeng-Jeng - The title "Jeng-Jeng" is derived from the onomatopoeia of a drum roll. It is a musical and often comedic commentary on the day's news by Clavio and Sotto. During the show's first run, the hosts were accompanied by an electric keyboardist and DZBB correspondent Orly Trinidad. Currently, the score is provided by a guitarist. From 2006 until 2008, the segment was expanded to include "Tigidong". "Tigidong" is a recorded parody of "Rosas Pandan," a Visayan song composed by Manuel Velez that was purportedly recorded by Sotto, which the host has repeatedly denied. The parody is about a promiscuous woman who enjoys casual sexual encounters. On the program, it is sung by Sotto, with the lyrics usually related to a news item about then President Gloria Macapagal Arroyo. Occasionally, the segment would also feature a "Balitawit," (a portmanteau of the Filipino words balita [news] and awit [song]) which is usually sung by Clavio. Straying from the structured composition of the "Jeng- Jeng," the Balitawit is commentary sang to a tune of a popular song. When the program returned on air in 2014, the segment became a part of Saksi sa Dobol B. However, the segment is now part of "Sino?", a former segment turned program.
- Sino? - (Who?) A daily blind item about showbiz and political personalities. Conventionally given by Clavio before the "Jeng-Jeng" segment. A running gag of this portion is a public apology given by one of the hosts who gives an incorrect allusion or suggestion. This segment also became part of Saksi sa Dobol B when the show returned. However, "Sino?" has spun-off its format from segment to program.

== See also ==
- One on One with Igan
- GMA Integrated News
- DZBB-AM
- Dobol B TV
