= Super Balita sa Umaga Nationwide =

Philippine morning radio newscast

- Title card used since April 24, 2017
- Genre: newscast
- Running time: 60 minutes
- Country of origin: Philippines
- Language: Tagalog
- Home station: Super Radyo DZBB 594; GMA News TV (2011–12, 2017–21); GTV (since 2021)
- Hosted by: Joel Reyes Zobel; Melo Del Prado
- Original release: January 8, 2007 – present

Super Balita sa Umaga Nationwide (transl. super news in the morning nationwide) is the flagship morning newscast of AM station DZBB in the Philippines. Originally anchored by Mike Enriquez and Joel Reyes Zobel, it premiered on January 8, 2007. The radio program is streaming online on DZBB's Facebook page and is also simulcast nationwide via all GMA Super Radyo stations and on GTV through the program block Dobol B TV. Zobel and Melo Del Prado currently serve as the anchors.

== Anchors ==
=== Current anchors ===
- Joel Reyes Zobel (2007–present)
- Melo Del Prado (2011–22; substitute anchor, 2022–present; permanently anchor)
- Orly Trinidad (2011–present) (substitute for Del Prado and Zobel)
- Weng Dela Peña (2019–present) (substitute for Del Prado and Zobel)
- Emil Sumangil (2020–present) (Super Balita sa Umaga Saturday Edition)
- Rowena Salvacion (2021–present) (substitute for Del Prado and Zobel)
- Kathy San Gabriel (2021–present) (substitute for Del Prado and Zobel) (also on Super Balita sa Umaga Saturday Edition)
- Toni Aquino (2022–present) (substitute for Del Prado and Zobel) (also on Super Balita sa Umaga Sunday Edition)
- Paolo Villena (2026–present) (Super Balita sa Umaga Sunday Edition)

=== Former anchors ===
- Mike Enriquez† (2007–22)
- Gani Oro (2007–13) (substitute anchor for Enriquez and Zobel)
- Ralph Obina (2020–26)

== Background ==
The broadcast debuted as Super Balita sa Umaga between 8 and 9 in the morning, running concurrently with Mike Enriquez's radio show Saksi sa Dobol B. The newscast was moved to 7 a.m. on January 8, 2007, after DZBB changed their early morning programming, and it began airing nationally via satellite. Joel Reyes Zobel, the station's program anchor and the voiceover for 24 Oras, then joined Enriquez as his co-anchor.

Along with Saksi sa Dobol B, the newscast started its simulcast under Dobol B sa News TV block on GMA News TV when it launched on February 28, 2011. The simulcast's first run ended on September 7, 2012, and the following month it was replaced by the morning show Kape at Balita. On April 24, 2017, after 4 years of hiatus, the newscast returned to TV as part of the second reiteration of Dobol B sa News TV, which is seen on GMA News TV.

On February 22, 2021, coinciding with the rebranding of GMA News TV to GTV, the program has also carried to the newly renamed Dobol B TV programming block.

On August 13, 2022, Super Balita sa Umaga Nationwide began airing at weekends even though the branding remains Super Balita sa Umaga. All Super Radyo AM stations as well as hybrid Barangay FM Super Radyo stations in Kalibo and General Santos now broadcast the newscast's Saturday and Sunday editions.

== Current segments ==
- Bantay Panahon/Bantay Bagyo - The weather segment and radio counterpart of GMA Integrated News Weather Center segment of GMA News programs on TV

== Occasional segments ==
- Bantay Bakuna (formerly Bantay COVID-19 and Bantay nCoV) - The segment in which the hosts presents the current situation about the COVID-19 vaccination program.
- Bantay Bulkan - The segment about the latest updates on volcanic eruptions.
- Bantay Baha - This segment about the latest updates on floods.
- Bantay Biyahe - This segment about the latest updates on roads, thoroughfare, and passenger terminals during holidays (i.e. during Holy Week, All Saints' Day, and Christmas seasons), and even transport strikes.
- Bantay Lindol - The segment about the latest updates on earthquakes.

== See also ==
- GMA Integrated News
- Super Radyo DZBB
- Dobol A sa Dobol B
- Dobol B TV
- Super Balita sa Tanghali Nationwide
- Saksi sa Dobol B
- Unang Hirit
- 24 Oras
