= Arnold Clavio =

Filipino journalist and television host (born 1965)

- Born: November 2, 1965 (age 61); Tondo, Manila, Philippines
- Other name: Igan
- Education: University of Santo Tomas (AB)
- Occupations: News anchor; host; radio commentator
- Years active: 1989–present
- Employer: GMA Network
- Children: 3

Arnold Clavio (Tagalog pronunciation: [ˈklabjo]; born November 2, 1965), also known as Igan, is a Filipino radio and television newscaster, journalist, and television host. He currently co-anchors GMA Network's morning show Unang Hirit, and DZBB's morning radio show One on One: Walang Personalan. He also writes a column entitled Hirit Na! for the tabloid newspaper Abante. He was the director of Solid Ground School in Plaridel, Bulacan in 1998.

== Early life and education ==
Whilst in school, Clavio was a member of his school newspaper's editorial staff. He was also a working student, working as a busboy, waiter, cook, and dishwasher at a KFC branch along Roxas Boulevard in circa 1986, following his father's unemployment. He earned his Bachelor of Arts degree in Journalism at the University of Santo Tomas Faculty of Arts and Letters in 1987.

== Career ==
After graduating, Clavio worked as a news writer at DWIZ. After a year, he became a field reporter for GMA Network's flagship radio station, DZBB in 1989.

Clavio made his first appearance as a television news reporter in 1994, when GMA offered him a reporter's slot in Brigada Siete, co-hosting with the late Louie Beltran and Jessica Soho. The next year, the Philippine Department of Health awarded Clavio top prize in their Philippine AIDS-STD Media Awards for his report on Sarah Jane Salazar. Later that year, the Asian Broadcasting Union named Clavio's coverage of Abu Sayyaf the "Best Reportage of a Crisis."

In 1996, Clavio became the host of Emergency, a late-night news and public affairs program, replacing Edu Manzano. In 1999, he began to host Unang Hirit, an early morning news and lifestyle program.

Three years later, Clavio was hosting his morning radio program, Dobol A sa Dobol B. The program was named 1999's "Best Public Affairs Program" on radio by the KBP Golden Dove Awards.

In 2001, Clavio was among the journalists who covered the May 1 riots near Malacañang Palace that were noted to be aggressive towards news media. On March 15, 2004, he replaced Mike Enriquez as co-anchor of Saksi. In November of that year, he co-hosted the Eat Bulaga Silver Special, a collaboration between TAPE Productions and GMA News and Public Affairs, with his co-host from Unang Hirit, Rhea Santos.

In 2009 and 2010, Clavio hosted a variety of television programs. In March 2009, he became part of Case Unclosed replacing Kara David, who was assigned for OFW Diaries. In September of that year, he was a guest newscaster for 24 Oras: Special Edition, a special weekend newscast that aired after Typhoon Ondoy, Typhoon Pepeng, and the Maguindanao massacre. He also appeared in 24 Oras as a substitute anchor for Mike Enriquez during his medical leave.

In March 2010, Clavio hosted Kandidato, a public affairs talk show featuring interviews with presidential candidates. The next month, the primetime talk show Tonight with Arnold Clavio was launched on the Q channel, which was later rebranded to GMA News TV. Clavio also hosted public service programs Rescue and Alisto.

In February 2011, he became a solo newscaster on Balita Pilipinas.

In March 2012, he was named as one of the 18 awardees at the 2nd UST AB Gantimpala Awards held at Club Filipino in Greenhills. In December 2012, Clavio was inducted to the Eastwood City Walk of Fame for his work as a newscaster.

== Controversies ==
On March 15, 2012, the Philippine Football Federation lodged a formal complaint with the GMA Network regarding allegedly "racist, discriminatory, libelous and malicious statements made by Clavio."

In May 2013, after TV host Vice Ganda made a "rape joke" in reference to Clavio's fellow anchor Jessica Soho, Clavio came out in defense of Soho, expressing his disapproval of Vice's remarks.

On November 6, 2013, Clavio came under fire for an interview conducted with attorney Alfredo Villamor on the morning talk show Unang Hirit. Villamor was standing in for Janet Napoles to discuss the "Pork Barrel scandal."

In August 2020, former OFW Sarah Balabagan, who is now a host of a Las Vegas-based radio program, claimed in a Facebook livestream that Clavio was the father of her eldest child, and that their relationship happened when she was still 17 years old. The revelation also sparked criticism on social media, with one Twitter user calling him "a pedophile". Balabagan had clarified in her livestream that the revelation was not out of revenge, but to merely put rumors to rest. She also added that she apologized to "everyone she hurt", including her family and Clavio's family, and that Clavio's wife forgave her through Facebook Messenger.

On November 13, 2020, Clavio, along with his co-host Ali Sotto, earned the ire of netizens after he asked an 'insensitive' question towards a woman who was a victim of Typhoon Vamco (locally named Ulysses). Vamco brought heavy flooding and left Metro Manila and several parts of Luzon in devastation on November 12. Among those who were affected by the flood was Angela Jardin whom the two asked, a resident from Provident Village in Marikina. She and five other people were stranded on the third floor of her house during the Typhoon's landfall. The conversation earned a lot of criticism from netizens who called out the radio anchors for being insensitive towards the victim. Netizens said it seems like he blamed the victim for choosing to stay in their house. Many netizens called out Clavio and Sotto for their "privilege" as they assume that others have options to find a better shelter.

== Personal life ==
Clavio is married with three children. He has a daughter with Sarah Balabagan.

Clavio started the Igan Foundation, whose stated mission is to help those living in poverty and diagnosed with diabetic alopecia.

In June 2024, Clavio disclosed that he had suffered a hemorrhagic stroke while driving home after playing golf on June 11. He also said he was on physical therapy and was expected to rehabilitate in one month or six weeks. Clavio is also diabetic.

== Career timeline ==
=== Television ===
Year	Title
1982, 1983	Eat Bulaga!
1996–2001	Brigada Siete
1996–98	GMA Balita
1996–2009	Emergency
1999–2004	i-Witness
1999–present	Unang Hirit
2004–24	Saksi
2007	Philippine Agenda
2009–10	Case Unclosed
2010, 2013	Kandidato
2010–13	Rescue
2010–20	Tonight with Arnold Clavio
2011	Sanib Puwersa
2011–21	Dobol B sa News TV
2011–14	Balita Pilipinas Primetime
2013–21	Alisto
2021–present	Dobol B TV
2023	Imbestigador ng Bayan: Pagpupugay sa nag-iisang Mike Enriquez

=== Radio ===
Year	Title	Station	Character
1998–2020	Dobol A sa Dobol B	DZBB-AM	Host
2000–present	Saksi sa Dobol B	DZBB-AM	Host
2008–2014	One on One with Igan	DZBB-AM	Host
2021–present	One on One: Walang Personalan	DZBB-AM	Host
2026	Liham ng Gabi	Barangay LS	Voice actor (Halloween special)

== Awards and nominations ==
- Outstanding Male News Presenter Saksi (1995) – Nominee
- Outstanding Celebrity Talk Program Host (2010) – Nominee
- Awardee, UST AB Gantimpala Awards (2012)

Year	Award giving body	Category	Nominated work	Results
1995	Asian Broadcasting Union	Best Reportage of a Crisis	—N/a	Won
1999	Golden Dove Awards	Best Public Affairs Program on Radio	—N/a	Won
2000	PMPC Star Awards for TV	Best Morning Show Host	Unang Hirit	Won
2001	PMPC Star Awards for TV	Best Morning Show Host	Unang Hirit	Won
2002	PMPC Star Awards for TV	Best Morning Show Host	Unang Hirit	Won
2006	Rotary Club of Manila Media Awards	Broadcast Journalist of the Year	—N/a	Won
2008	PMPC Star Awards for TV	Best Morning Show Host	Unang Hirit	Won
2012	Eastwood City Walk Of Fame	Celebrity Inductee	—N/a	Won
2013	PMPC Star Awards for TV	Best Morning Show Host	Unang Hirit	Won
2015	PMPC Star Awards for TV	Best Morning Show Host	Unang Hirit	Won
2017	PMPC Star Awards for TV	Best Male Newscaster	Saksi	Won
2018	PMPC Star Awards for TV	Excellence In Broadcasting Award	GMA News	Won

== See also ==
- GMA News
- GMA Public Affairs
- DZBB-AM
