= GoBingo =

Philippine television game show

- Title card
- Genre: Game show
- Directed by: Uro Q. dela Cruz
- Presented by: Arnell Ignacio; Krista Kleiner
- Country of origin: Philippines
- Original language: Tagalog
- No. of episodes: 130 (second run)

Production
- Executive producer: Wilma Galvante
- Camera setup: Multiple-camera setup
- Production company: GMA Entertainment TV

Original release
- Network: GMA Network
- Release: December 9, 1996 – January 1, 1999
- Release: April 14 – October 10, 2008

GoBingo is a Philippine television game show broadcast by GMA Network. Hosted by Arnell Ignacio, it premiered on December 9, 1996 and concluded on January 1, 1999. The show returned on April 14, 2008, and concluded on October 10, 2008, with a total of 130 episodes.

== Ratings ==
According to AGB Nielsen Philippines' Nationwide Urban Television Audience Measurement People in television homes, the pilot episode of GoBingo earned a 21.1% rating. The final episode scored a 16% rating.

== Accolades ==
Accolades received by GoBingo
Year	Award	Category	Recipient	Result	Ref.
2008	22nd PMPC Star Awards for Television	Best Game Show	GoBingo	Nominated	
2008	22nd PMPC Star Awards for Television	Best Game Show Host	Arnell Ignacio	Nominated	
