= Arianne Bautista =

Filipino actor (born 1993)

- Born: Arianne Angeli Bautista; September 1, 1993 (age 32); Quezon City, Philippines
- Other names: Arianne, Angeli
- Occupations: Actress, model, TV host
- Years active: 2013–present
- Agent: GMA Artist Center (2014–2019, since 2024)
- Known for: Selma, Pamela, Agent A

Arianne Angeli Bautista (born September 1, 1993) is a Filipino commercial model, actress, and former host of GMA Network. She is currently a freelance artist since 2019.

== Early life ==
Arianne Bautista was born and raised in Quezon City. She studied in La Consolacion College Caloocan during her grade school and high school years. She graduated Bachelor of Science in Tourism from the University of Santo Tomas in 2010. She started as a commercial model while she was still in her senior years but then eventually started to enter showbiz in 2013. Her first TV appearance was in ABS-CBN's show Juan dela Cruz where she played a Secretary role. She signed a contract under GMA Artist Center the following year. For her first stint, she was chosen to be the best friend of the antagonist, Wynwyn Marquez, in Kambal Sirena in 2014. Bautista was later signed as one among the guest hosts of Wowowin, joining Rhian Ramos, Denise Barbacena, Gabbi Garcia and Ashley Ortega and show host Willie Revillame.

== TV projects ==
Bautista has signed for a number of TV appearances with GMA Network. This includes appearances in GMA Network-produced TV series as well as the sitcom Bubble Gang, and appearances in Wowowin as guest host and Laff, Camera, Action! as main host. Arianne appeared and rose to fame as one of the cast in Ika-6 na Utos as Selma, a supportive friend and accomplice of Georgia. During 2019, she became a freelancer and was able to make an appearance in her former home network, ABS-CBN, via Minute to Win It.

== Filmography ==
=== Television ===
Year	Title	Character name
2021	Mars Pa More	Herself / Guest
2020	Bawal Na Game Show	Herself / Contestant
2019	Minute to Win It	Herself / Contestant
2019	Mars	Herself / Guest
2018	Pamilya Roces	Kate
2018	Wish Ko Lang: Ang Kalbaryo ni Sheena	Sheena
2018	The One That Got Away	Beauty Martinez
2018	Road Trip	Herself / Guest
2017	All Star Videoke	Kalye-oke Babe
2017	Tsuperhero	Pinky Salcedo
2016–2018	Ika-6 na Utos	Selma Del Rosario (in Prison)
2016–2019	Bubble Gang	Various Roles
2016–2019	Alisto!	Herself / Agent A
2016	Dear Uge: Acting Dyowa	Shiela
2016	Laff, Camera, Action!	Herself
2016	Juan Happy Love Story	Sahlee
2016	Dangwa	Nana
2016	Naku, Boss Ko!	Angela Mae "Gelai" Inocente
2016	That's My Amboy	Premiere Night Star Olympics Host
2016	Maynila: Copy Cat Love	Rachel
2015–2016	Wowowin	Herself
2015–2016	Buena Familia	Pamela
2015	Second Chances	April Villacorta
2014	Ang Lihim ni Annasandra	Reporter
2014	Kambal Sirena	Annie
2014	Carmela	Sarah
2013	Juan dela Cruz	Secretary role
