= All-Star K! =

Philippine television game show

- Title card
- Also known as: K! The 1 Million Peso Videoke Challenge
- Genre: Game show
- Presented by: Arnel Ignacio; Allan K.; Jaya
- Country of origin: Philippines
- Original language: Tagalog
- No. of episodes: 512

Production
- Executive producer: Darling De Jesus
- Production locations: Quezon City, Philippines
- Camera setup: Multiple-camera setup
- Running time: 60 minutes
- Production company: GMA Entertainment TV

Original release
- Network: GMA Network
- Release: January 13, 2002 – October 18, 2009

Related
- All-Star Videoke

All-Star K!, formerly K! The 1 Million Peso Videoke Challenge, is a Philippine television karaoke game show broadcast by GMA Network. Originally hosted by Arnell Ignacio, it premiered on January 13, 2002. The show concluded on October 18, 2009, with a total of 512 episodes. Jaya and Allan K. served as the final hosts. It is the longest running game show of GMA Network.

== Hosts ==
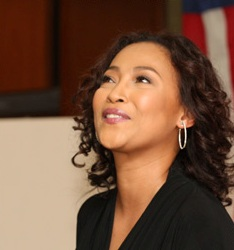
Jaya serves as a host.

- Arnell Ignacio (2002–04)
- Jaya (2004–09)
- Allan K. (2004–09)

== Ratings ==
According to AGB Nielsen Philippines' Mega Manila household television ratings, the final episode of All Star K! scored a 15.16% rating.

== Accolades ==
Accolades received by All-Star K!
Year	Award	Category	Recipient	Result	Ref.
2007	21st PMPC Star Awards for Television	Best Game Show	All-Star K!	Nominated	
2007	21st PMPC Star Awards for Television	Best Game Show Host	Allan K. Jaya	Nominated	
2008	22nd PMPC Star Awards for Television	Best Game Show	All-Star K!	Nominated	
2008	22nd PMPC Star Awards for Television	Best Game Show Host	Allan K. Jaya	Nominated	
2009	23rd PMPC Star Awards for Television	Best Game Show Host	Allan K. Jaya	Nominated	
2009	23rd PMPC Star Awards for Television	Best Variety/Game Show	All-Star K!	Nominated	
