= Alisto =

Philippine television public service show

- Title card from 2017 to 2021
- Genre: Public broadcasting; Docudrama
- Directed by: Rember Gelera
- Presented by: Arnold Clavio
- Country of origin: Philippines
- Original language: Tagalog

Production
- Producer: Marissa Flores
- Camera setup: Multiple-camera setup
- Running time: 30 minutes
- Production company: GMA News and Public Affairs

Original release
- Network: GMA Network (March 23, 2013 – April 14, 2020, January 5, 2021 – February 9, 2021); GMA News TV (July 28, 2020 – December 29, 2020)
- Release: March 23, 2013 – February 9, 2021

Alisto (transl. alert) is a Philippine television public service show broadcast by GMA Network and GMA News TV. Hosted by Arnold Clavio, it premiered on GMA Network on March 23, 2013 on the network's Saturday evening line up. The show concluded on GMA Network on April 14, 2020. The show moved to GMA News TV on July 28, 2020 on the network's Power Block line up. The show returned to GMA Network on January 5, 2021. The show concluded on February 9, 2021.

== Overview ==
The show features stories from actual videos of people in life-threatening situations. The program also has a regular segment exposing the latest modus operandi in crime as well as breaches in safety. It also features a road traffic segment hosted by Arianne Bautista as "Agent A".

== Production ==
In March 2020, production was halted due to the enhanced community quarantine in Luzon caused by the COVID-19 pandemic. The show resumed its programming on July 28, 2020.

== Ratings ==
According to AGB Nielsen Philippines' Mega Manila household television ratings, the pilot episode of Alisto earned a 7.9% rating.

== Accolades ==
Accolades received by Alisto
Year	Award	Category	Recipient	Result	Ref.
2014	Golden Screen TV Awards	Outstanding Crime/Investigative Program	"Hostage Taking at Mga Kaso ng Panghohold-up Caught On Cam"	Nominated	
2014	Golden Screen TV Awards	Outstanding Crime/Investigative Program Host	Arnold Clavio	Nominated	
2015	29th PMPC Star Awards for Television	Best Public Service Program Host	Arnold Clavio	Nominated	
2016	30th PMPC Star Awards for Television	Best Public Service Program	Alisto	Nominated	
2016	30th PMPC Star Awards for Television	Best Public Service Program Host	Arnold Clavio	Nominated	
