= Super Balita sa Tanghali Nationwide =

Philippine noontime radio newscast

- Genre: Newscast
- Running time: 60 minutes
- Country of origin: Philippines
- Home station: Super Radyo DZBB 594; GMA News TV
- Hosted by: Lala Roque; Orly Trinidad
- Original release: May 12, 2008 – present

Super Balita sa Tanghali Nationwide (transl. super noontime news nationwide) is the noontime newscast of AM station DZBB, premiered on May 12, 2008, originally anchored by Gani Oro and Melo del Prado. Lala Roque and Orly Trinidad currently serve as the anchors. The radio program is streaming online on Super Radyo DZBB's Facebook page and simulcast on all GMA Super Radyo stations in the country. From March 23, 2020 to September 18, 2020, the newscast was simulcast under Dobol B sa News TV block on GMA News TV as a provisional programming measure due to the COVID-19 pandemic.

== Anchors ==
=== Current anchors ===
- Orly Trinidad (2017–present)
- Lala Roque (2019–present)
- Weng Dela Peña (substitute for Trinidad; 2019–present)
- Zen Obanil (substitute for Roque; 2020–present)
- Shirley Escalante (substitute for Roque; 2021–present)
- Sam Nielsen (substitute for Trinidad; 2021–present) (also on Super Balita sa Tanghali Saturday and Sunday editions)
- Pamela Adriano (2024–present) (Super Balita sa Tanghali Saturday and Sunday editions)
- Rowena Salvacion (substitute for Trinidad; 2025–present)
- Carlo Mateo (substitute for Trinidad; 2026–present)

=== Former anchors ===
- Melo del Prado (2008–18)
- Gani Oro (2008–13)
- Benjie Alejandro (2013–17; 2018–19)
- Julee Ann Mae Cabrera-Cera (2019–21)
- Kaye Morales (substitute for Roque; 2020–24)
- Glen Juego (substitute for Trinidad; 2022–26)
- Ralph Obina (substitute for Trinidad; 2021–26)

== Awards ==
- Winner, Special Citation Award for News Program - 39th Catholic Mass Media Awards (2017)

== See also ==
- GMA Integrated News
- Super Radyo DZBB
- Super Balita sa Umaga Nationwide
