= Rescue (Philippine TV program) =

Philippine television documentary show

- Title card
- Genre: Documentary
- Presented by: Arnold Clavio
- Country of origin: Philippines
- Original language: Tagalog

Production
- Camera setup: Multiple-camera setup
- Running time: 30 minutes
- Production company: GMA News and Public Affairs

Original release
- Network: GMA Network
- Release: May 13, 2010 – February 14, 2013

Rescue is a Philippine television documentary show broadcast by GMA Network. Hosted by Arnold Clavio, it premiered on May 13, 2010. The show concluded on February 14, 2013.

== Premise ==
The show features actual footages of raids, rescue operations of emergency response teams, on-site accidents, and numerous other life-threatening situations.

== Ratings ==
According to AGB Nielsen Philippines' Mega Manila household television ratings, the final episode of Rescue scored a 7.3% rating.

== Accolades ==
Accolades received by Rescue
Year	Award	Category	Recipient	Result	Ref.
2011	8th Golden Screen TV Awards	Outstanding Public Service Program	Rescue	Nominated	
2011	8th Golden Screen TV Awards	Outstanding Public Service Program Host	Arnold Clavio	Nominated	
2012	26th PMPC Star Awards for Television	Best Public Service Program Host	Arnold Clavio	Nominated	
2013	10th Golden Screen TV Awards	Outstanding Public Service Program	Rescue	Nominated	
2013	10th Golden Screen TV Awards	Outstanding Public Affairs Host	Arnold Clavio	Nominated	
2013	27th PMPC Star Awards for Television	Best Public Service Program	Rescue	Nominated	
2013	27th PMPC Star Awards for Television	Best Public Service Program Host	Arnold Clavio	Nominated	
