= Review Philippines =

Philippine television news show

- Title card
- Genre: News broadcasting
- Presented by: Mike Enriquez
- Country of origin: Philippines
- Original language: English

Production
- Executive producer: Marissa Flores
- Running time: 60 minutes
- Production company: GMA News and Public Affairs

Original release
- Network: GMA Pinoy TV (2005–07); Q (2007–08)
- Release: June 2005 – 2008

Review Philippines is a Philippine television newscast show broadcast by GMA Pinoy TV and Q. Anchored by Mike Enriquez, it premiered in June 2005 on GMA Pinoy TV then Q on August 11, 2007. The show concluded in 2008.
