= One on One with Igan =

Philippine weekday morning radio show

- Genre: public affairs, news analysis, commentary
- Running time: 1 hour
- Country of origin: Philippines
- Home station: DZBB
- Starring: Arnold Clavio; Lala Roque
- Created by: GMA Network
- Original release: February 11, 2008 – January 10, 2014
- No. of episodes: n/a (airs daily)

One on One with Igan was a Philippine weekday morning radio show hosted by Arnold Clavio and Lala Roque aired over GMA Network flagship radio station, DZBB (Metro Manila). The program replaced Dobol A sa Dobol B when Clavio's co-host Ali Sotto migrated to Spain. It became also a former segment of Unang Hirit on GMA Network.

== Program segments ==
- Gloria Watch
- Starpok - Showbiz News
- Jeng-Jeng
- Metro Manila Hataw
- Txt Pabaon

== One on One: Walang Personalan ==
One on One: Walang Personalan
- Genre: public affairs, news analysis, commentary
- Running time: 1 hour
- Country of origin: Philippines
- Home station: DZBB
- Starring: Arnold Clavio; Connie Sison
- Created by: GMA Network
- Original release: January 4, 2021 – present
- No. of episodes: n/a (airs daily)

On January 4, 2021, One on One was revived and renamed as One on One: Walang Personalan, is originally hosted by Arnold Clavio and Rowena Salvacion after Ali Sotto moved to Net 25. The format of the show is the same as its predecessors. Clavio and Connie Sison currently serve as the hosts.

== Hosts ==
=== Current ===
- Arnold Clavio (2021–present)
- Connie Sison (2021–present)
- Rowena Salvacion (substitute for Sison; 2021–present)
- Orly Trinidad (substitute for Clavio; 2021–present)
- Kathy San Gabriel (substitute for Sison; 2021–present)
- Joel Reyes Zobel (substitute for Clavio; 2021–present)
- Toni Aquino (substitute for Sison; 2023–present)
- Henry Atuelan (substitute for Clavio; 2023–present)
- Paolo Villena (substitute for Clavio; 2023–present)
- Rod Vega (substitute for Clavio; 2023–present)
- Carlo Mateo (substitute for Clavio; 2023–present)
- Lala Roque (substitute for Sison; 2023–present)
- Kaye Morales (substitute for Sison; 2023–present)
- Sam Nielsen (substitute for Clavio; 2023–present)
- Zen Obanil (substitute for Sison; 2023–present)
- Allan Gatus (substitute for Clavio; 2023–present)
- Tuesday Sagun-Niu (substitute for Sison; 2023–present)
- Manny Vargas (substitute for Clavio; 2023–present)
- Isa Avendaño-Umali (substitute for Sison; 2023–present)
- Weng dela Peña (substitute for Clavio; 2024–present)
- Melo del Prado (substitute for Clavio; 2024–present)
- Christian Mano (substitute for Clavio; 2024–present)
- Shirley Escalante (substitute for Sison; 2024–present)
- Ninfa Ravelo (substitute for Sison; 2024–present)
- Mao Dela Cruz (substitute for Clavio; 2024–present)
- Mark Makalakad (substitute for Clavio; 2024–present)

=== Former ===
- Ralph Obina (substitute for Clavio; 2023–26)
- Glen Juego (substitute for Clavio; 2024–26)

== Program segments ==
- Metro Manila Hataw
- Tunay na Pangbayan Walang Personalan
- Karaokray

== See also ==
- Dobol A sa Dobol B
- GMA News
- Super Radyo DZBB
