= Ali Sotto =

Filipino actress and broadcaster

- Born: Maria Aloha Leilani Sancianco Carag
- Other names: Aloha, Ali Sotto
- Occupations: Actress, radio broadcaster, news anchor, segment host
- Years active: 1987–present
- Agents: Viva Artists Agency (1987-1995) ABS-CBN (1988–1994) GMA Network (1995–2021) Manila Broadcasting Company (1997–1999) Associated Broadcasting Company (2004–2006); Eagle Broadcasting Corporation (2021–present)
- Spouses: Marcelino Antonio "Maru" Sotto Jr. (annulled); Omar Bsaies
- Children: 2, including Miko

Ali Sotto (Tagalog pronunciation: [ˈsɔtɔ]; born Maria Aloha Leilani Sancianco Carag) is a Filipino actress, radio broadcaster and news anchor and former singer. Her previous screen name was Aloha and now Ali Sotto. She was popularly heard on NET25 programs like are: Ano Sa Palagay N'yo? With Pat P-Daza and Mata Ng Agila Primetime with Alex Santos.

== Personal life and career ==
Ali was named Aloha by her parents as they married in Hawaii. Her mother was a professor in Food and Nutrition at the University of Santo Tomas. Her father was with the US Navy until 1969. She is the youngest in the family and has three brothers (Allan, Alvin & AJ).

Sotto separated from her first husband Maru Sotto, but they remained intimate friends. She is now married to her second husband, Omar Bsaies, an American-Tunisian who is a retired diplomat.

As Sotto's wife, Helen Gamboa and Dina Bonnevie were her sisters-in-law and the Sotto brothers were her brothers-in-law: Val, Tito and Vic Sotto. She and Maru had two children, Chino Sotto and late actor Miko Sotto.

Ali was discovered by George Canseco at the Inter-University Songfest at FEU in November 1976.

She was a host of the television shows Ali! and Metro, which was the sole public service program at that time on television, and the only public affiliate program of ABC (now 5) that earns. She used to co-host Sino? with Mike Enriquez and Arnold Clavio from 9:00 AM to 10:00 AM and Dobol A sa Dobol B, a DZBB program, with Clavio every Monday to Friday from 10:00 AM to 11:00 AM until 2020.

It was an exception that TV hosts could invite successive showbiz names as their guests in just a few months. These were Vilma Santos, Maricel Soriano, Sharon Cuneta, Susan Roces and Dolphy. She was the only one who was courageous enough to ask questions directly to Susan Roces if she believed Fernando Poe Jr. had an illegitimate child.

After her son, Miko, died in December 2003, she co-founded INA (Inang Naulila sa Anak) Foundation, a foundation whose mission statement is "to provide psycho-social support to its members and other mothers who have also lost their children through projects and programs aimed at helping them move on from a place of grief to a place of hope – empowering them to reach out to others".

== Filmography ==
=== Film ===
Year	Title	Role(s)
1987	Kung Aagawin Mo ang Lahat sa Akin	Joyce
1987	Jack & Jill	Delia
1987	Walang Karugtong ang Nakaraan	Sandra
1991	Maging Sino Ka Man	Tala
1992	Boboy Salonga: Batang Tondo	Dolor Salonga
1994	The Maggie dela Riva Story (God... Why Me?)	Ms. Marcos
1995	The Flor Contemplacion Story	Alicia Ramos, Philippine Ambassador to Singapore
1996	Istokwa	Mrs. Camacho
2014	Where I Am King	Olivia

=== Television ===
Year	Title	Role(s)
1988–1991	Magandang Umaga Po	Host
1990	Mongolian Barbecue	Guest
1993–1994	Eat Bulaga!	Co-host
1995–1998	Katok Mga Misis	Host
1998–1999	Compañero y Compañera	Host
1999	Di Ba't Ikaw	Karina Latada
2000	GMA Mini-Series: Umulan Man o Umaraw	Doña Luisa
2004–2006	Sentro	Anchor
2011	Star Box	Host
2011–2012	Personalan	Host
2017–2020	Dobol B sa News TV: Dobol A sa Dobol B	Host
2017–2020	Dobol B sa News TV: Sino?	Host
2021–2025	A.S.P.N: Ano sa Palagay N'yo'?	Host
2024–present	Mata ng Agila	Anchor

=== Radio ===
Year	Title
1996–1998	Damdaming Bayan
1997–1999	Balitang Bayan Numero Uno: 5am Edition
1998–2008; 2014–2020	Dobol A sa Dobol B
2014–2020	Saksi sa Dobol B: Sino?
2021–2024	Ano sa Palagay N'yo?

== Awards and nominations ==
Year	Award giving body	Award	Result
1991	Gawad Urian	Best Supporting Actress (My Other Woman)	Nominated
2014	Volunteers Against Crime and Corruption	Outstanding Radio Anchor (w/ Arnold Clavio)	Won
2017	Volunteers Against Crime and Corruption	Best Teleradio Anchor (w/ Arnold Clavio)	Won
2018	Trinity University of Asia	Best Female AM Broadcast Journalist	Won
2019	Gawad Filipino Award	Natatanging Filipina sa Larangan ng Pagbababalita at Pagtulong sa Karapatan ng Kababaihan	Won
2019	FAMAS	Dr Jose R Perez Memorial Award for Journalism	Won
2019	Rotary Club of Manila	Journalism Award for Radio Female Broadcaster of the Year	Won
2019	ALTA Media Icon Awards	Best AM Radio Female Personality	Won
2019	Gawad Filipino Award	Best Radio and TV Program Host	Won
2019	Animo Media Choice Awards by De La Salle Dasmariñas Alumni Association, Incorporated	AM Female Anchor	Nominated
2020	Gawad Lasallianeta Award by De La Salle Araneta University	Most Outstanding Radio Broadcaster	Nominated
2020	Gawad Filipino Award	Bayaning Pilipino Frontliners Award (w/ Joel Reyes Zobel)	Won
2022	Gawad Filipino Award	Outstanding Radio Female Broadcaster of the Year	Won
2022	Gawad Pilipino Icon of the Year 2022	Outstanding Public Affairs Host of the Year	Won
2022	Mrs. Universe Philippines Foundation	Philippines' Most Exceptional Men & Women 2022	Won
2022	Asia Pacific Luminare Awards	Asia's Outstanding Achievement in the Field of Journalism	Won
2023	Gawad Filipino Award	Most Empowered Women	Won
