= Katok Mga Misis =

Philippine television talk show

- Title card
- Genre: Talk show
- Presented by: Giovanni Calvo; Ali Sotto; Bayani Agbayani; Arnell Ignacio; Sanjay Acosta
- Country of origin: Philippines
- Original language: Tagalog

Production
- Production locations: Studio A, GMA 7 Building, Quezon City, Philippines
- Camera setup: Multiple-camera setup
- Running time: 42 minutes
- Production company: GMA Entertainment TV

Original release
- Network: GMA Network
- Release: July 31, 1995 – June 5, 1998

Katok Mga Misis (transl. knock mrs.) is a Philippine television talk show broadcast by GMA Network. Hosted by Giovanni Calvo, Ali Sotto, Sanjay Acosta and Bayani Agbayani, it premiered on July 31, 1995. The show concluded on June 5, 1998.

== Hosts ==
- Ali Sotto
- Bayani Agbayani
- Arnell Ignacio
- Sanjay Acosta
- Ai-Ai delas Alas (reliever of Ali Sotto)
- Jackie Lou Blanco (reliever of Ali Sotto and Arnell Ignacio)
- Giovanni Calvo (1995-97)
