= Journal (German TV programme) =

- Genre: News programme
- Country of origin: Germany
- Original languages: German; English; Spanish; Arabic

Production
- Producer: DW
- Production location: Berlin
- Running time: 30 minutes

Original release
- Network: DW
- Release: 1 April 1992 – 22 June 2015

Related
- NHK Newsline; BBC World News

The Journal is a TV newsprogram on Deutsche Welle, broadcast from its studios in Berlin, Germany. It aired daily, usually on the hour, and was available in English, German, Spanish, and Arabic. These were broadcast via satellite to different parts of the world, but all were available DW's website and were often relayed via local broadcasters/channels.

The Journal was initially aired on April 1, 1992, when RIAS-TV transformed into DW (Deutsche Welle). The program underwent significant rebrandings in 1994, 1999, 2002, and 2006.

On June 22, 2015, The Journal concluded its run as DW-TV underwent a reorganization. It was subsequently replaced by DW News, known as DW Nachrichten in German and DW Noticias in Spanish.

== Editions ==
There were 3-, 15-, and 30-minute editions of the Journal.

=== Weekdays ===
The 30-minute broadcast had two anchors. These editions included a business news segment with a ticker showing European and German stock prices and commodity prices.

The English-language Journal was broadcast on weekdays at 0100, 1400, and 1900 UTC. The Spanish-language Journal was broadcast at 2200 and 0100 UTC (prime time for Latin American viewers). The 30-minute Journal in German was broadcast at 1300 and 2100 UTC.

=== Weekends ===
At weekends, sports news replaced the business news segment. The last 15-minute segment of each program consisted of one of the following:

- Journal - Interview (German Interview, Spanish: Entrevista)
- Journal - Reporters (German and Spanish: Reporter)
- Journal - The Week (German: Die Woche, Spanish: La Semana)
- Journal - Business Review (German: Wirtschaftsbilanz, Spanish: Semana de Economia)

== 2006 Revamp ==
The Journal was revamped in June 2006. This included moving to a new studio, new theme music, and new lower-third graphics.

== 2009 new look ==
The program was revamped again in 2009. On weekdays, Journal With Business (Journal mit Wirtschaft in German), aired alongside Journal with In Depth (in German: Journal mit Tagesthema). A new edition, Journal with Business Review or in German, Journal mit Wirtschaftsbilanz broadcast along with three editions such as Journal with Interview or Journal mit Interview in German, was broadcast on weekends. Journal with The Week (in German: Journal mit Die Woche) and Journal with Reporters (in German:Journal mit Reportern).

== 2012 new look ==
Changes were made to the program following DW-TV becoming DW in February 2012. Spanish-language programming, which had been limited to two hours a day, was increased to 24-hours a day. Arabic-language output was also increased. Most commonly, the program had three-minute summaries but there was also 15-minute editions and full 30-minute programs.
