= Arnell Ignacio =

Filipino comedian

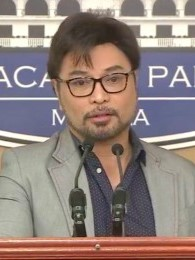
- Ignacio in 2019

Administrator of Overseas Workers Welfare Administration
- In office August 10, 2022 – May 16, 2025
- President: Bongbong Marcos
- Preceded by: Hans Leo J. Cacdac
- Succeeded by: Patricia Yvonne Caunan

Deputy Executive Director and Deputy Administrator of Overseas Workers Welfare Administration
- In office January 25, 2018 – February 26, 2019
- President: Rodrigo Duterte

Assistant Vice President for Community Relation and Services Department of Philippine Amusement and Gaming Corporation
- In office July 7, 2016 – January 25, 2018
- President: Rodrigo Duterte

Personal details
- Born: Arnaldo Arevalo Ignacio; March 17, 1964 (age 62) Philippines
- Party: Independent (2009–present)
- Other political affiliations: LDP (2004–2009)
- Spouse: Frannie Ignacio (m. 2004)
- Children: 1
- Occupation: Actor, singer, comedian, host

Arnaldo "Arnell" Arevalo Ignacio (born March 17, 1964) is a Filipino television personality, actor, singer-songwriter, and public official.

== Television career ==
Ignacio has hosted several shows, like Chibugan Na!, Kwarta o Kahon, GoBingo, Katok Mga Misis, and K! The 1 Million Peso Videoke Challenge, and occasional host for ASAP and Wil Time Bigtime. He also guest judged for Kakaibang Idol, a special edition of Philippine Idol which was held for contestants with the most notable auditions.

== Politics and government ==
In 2004, he declined offers to run as the running mate of former Mayor Mel Mathay, but later vied for a city council seat in Quezon City's 4th district.

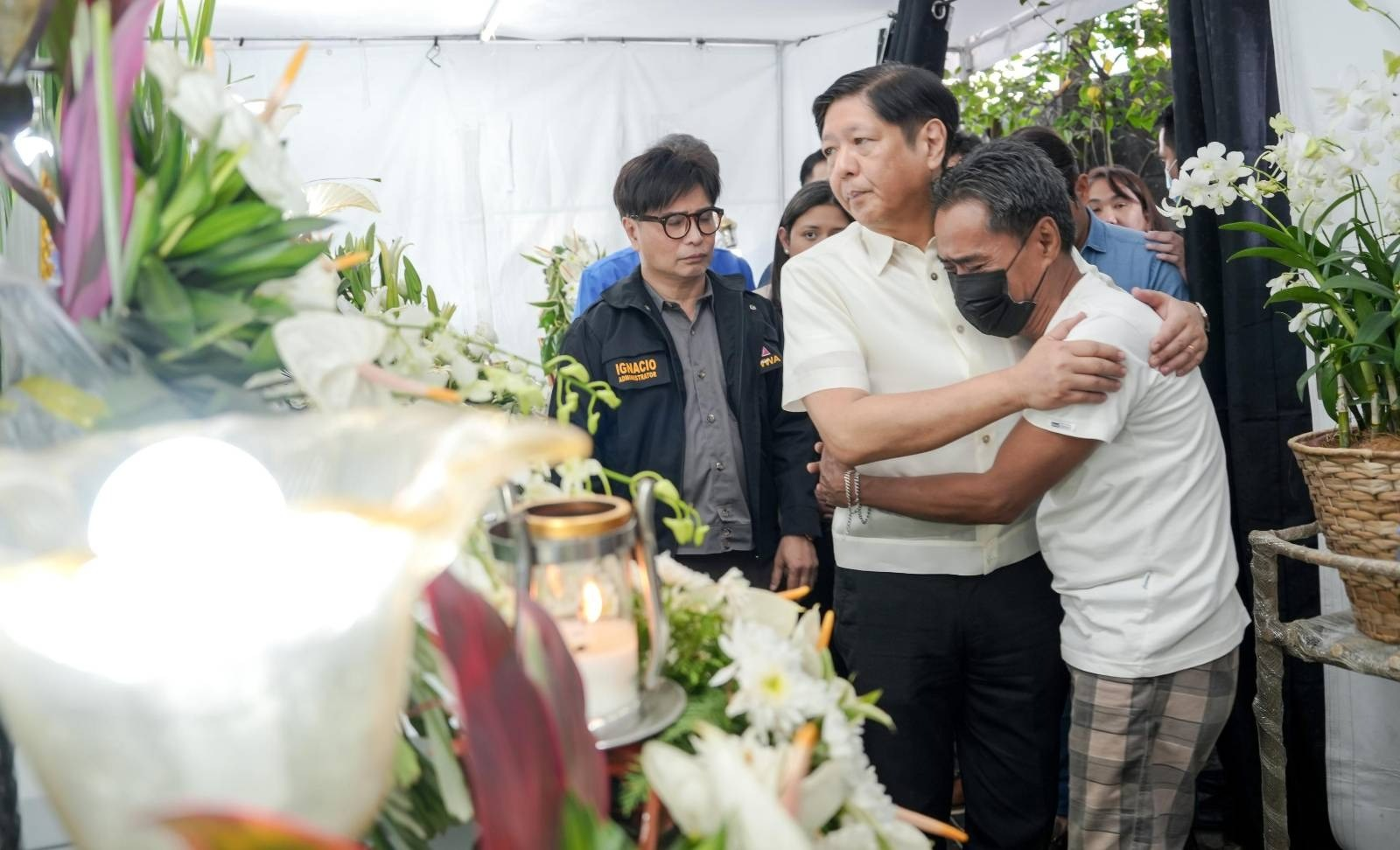
Ignacio (left) and President Bongbong Marcos (center) at the funeral of Jullebee Ranara in Las Piñas on January 30, 2023

In 2016, he was appointed by President Rodrigo Duterte as Assistant Vice President for Community Relation and Services Department of the Philippine Amusement and Gaming Corporation (PAGCOR). He served in PAGCOR until January 2018 when he was transferred to the Overseas Workers Welfare Administration (OWWA) to serve as a deputy executive director and deputy administrator. He resigned from his post in February 2019 reportedly for personal reasons.

In 2022, Ignacio was appointed by President Bongbong Marcos as the new administrator of OWWA. But in May 2025, he was dismissed from the same position due to loss of trust and confidence following his involvement in a ₱1.4-billion land acquisition deal intended for the accommodation of Overseas Filipino Workers that was allegedly acquired without the required legal approval and authorization of OWWA's board of trustees.

== Filmography ==
=== Film ===
Year	Title	Producer	Role	Note
	Isang Araw Lang	Breakthrough and Milestones Productions International		Main Cast
1997	Isang Tanong, Isang Sagot	Breakthrough and Milestones Productions International		Main Cast
2025	Jackstone 5		Bruno	Main Cast

=== Television ===
Year	Title	Role
	Chibugan Na!	Host
	Actually, Yun Na!	Host
	Family Kuarta o Kahon	Host
1995–1998	Katok Mga Misis	Host
	Ober Da Bakod	
1996–1999; 2008	GoBingo	Host
	Golympics	Host
	Brunch	Co-host
	Hiwalay Kung Hiwalay Daw	
	Comedy Central Market	Host
	Text Game Show	
	Cooking.Com	Host
2002–2004	K! The 1 Million Peso Videoke Challenge	Host
2004–2005	MTB: Ang Saya-Saya	Host
	Wowowee	Himself
2006–2007	Now Na!	Host
	Shall We Dance: The Celebrity Dance Challenge	Co-host
	Shall We Dance: The Stars Are Back	Co-host
2006	I Luv NY	Chichi Florence LaRoux
2007	Stars on Ice	Host
2007	Mga Mata ni Anghelita	Manager / Madam
	All Star K!: The 1 Million Peso Videoke Challenge	Host
2009	Daisy Siete: Kambalilong	Various
	Quickfire: 10 Minute Kitchen Wonders	Guest appearance
2009–2010	Sana Ngayong Pasko	Wanda
	Wil Time Bigtime	Host
	The Jose and Wally Show Starring Vic Sotto	
	Game 'N Go	Host
	The Amazing Race Philippines	Leg 1 only: Quizmaster of the Ikot Detour choice.
	Solved na Solved	Host
	The Singing Bee	Himself/Guest
	Sunday PinaSaya	Melody
	Dear Uge	
	Digong Hotline 8888	Host
	Magandang Buhay	Himself
	The Boobay and Tekla Show	Himself
2021	Wowowin	Himself
	Arnelli in da Haus	Host

== Radio ==
- Si Susan Na, si Arnell Pa! (DZBB) (with Susan Enriquez)
- No More Lonely Nights with Arnell (DZIQ)
- PATOL: Republika ni Arnelli (Radyo5 92.3 News FM, with simulcast on AksyonTV)
- Manila sa Umaga! (Radyo5 92.3 News FM, with simulcast on AksyonTV)
- LOL: Labor of Love (DZMM) (with Rica Lazo)
- OMJ: Oh My Job! (DZBB) (with Tuesday Sagun-Niu and Bea Binene)

== Awards ==
- Winner, Best Game Show Host – PMPC Star Awards for Television (1997 & 2006)
  - Go Bingo (GMA Network)
  - Now Na! (QTV 11)
- Winner, Best Talent Show Hosts – PMPC Star Awards for Television (2008)
  - Shall We Dance: The Celebrity Dance Challenge (with Lucy Torres-Gomez & Dominic Ochoa, ABC 5 "Now TV5")

== Personal life ==
Ignacio was in a relationship with Frannie Ignacio, a businesswoman, as his live-in partner for 12 years. They got married on March 10, 2004, but they separated in the same year. Since 2015, he had plans to have their marriage annulled. Together, they have a daughter.

Ignacio is openly gay. He got engaged to singer Ken El Psalmer in June 2015, but broke up almost two months later.
