= 2003 in Norwegian television =

This is a list of Norwegian television related events from 2003.

== Events ==
- January - The Norwegian version of Pop Idol debuts on TV2.
- 15 May - Eva Lill Baukhol wins series 3 of Big Brother Norway.
- 23 May - Kurt Nielsen wins the first series of Idol.
- May - Release date of Kurt Nilsen's debut single, "She's So High".

== Debuts ==
- January 2003 - Idol (2003-2007, 2011–present)

== Ending this year ==
- Big Brother Norway (2001-2003, 2011)

== Networks and services ==
=== Launches ===
| Network | Type | Launch date | Notes | Source |
|---|---|---|---|---|
| Disney Channel | Cable television | 28 February | | |
| Visjon Norge | Cable television | 24 March | | |

== See also ==
- 2003 in Norway
