= Brigada Siete =

Philippine television documentary show

- Title card
- Genre: Documentary
- Presented by: Louie Beltran; Arnold Clavio; Tito Sotto; Jessica Soho
- Country of origin: Philippines
- Original language: Tagalog

Production
- Camera setup: Multiple-camera setup
- Running time: 60–90 minutes
- Production company: GMA News and Public Affairs

Original release
- Network: GMA Network
- Release: December 5, 1993 – September 29, 2001

Related
- Brigada

Brigada Siete (transl. brigade seven) is a Philippine television investigative documentary show broadcast by GMA Network. It premiered on December 5, 1993. The show concluded on September 29, 2001. The show was revived in 2011 as Brigada.

After Louie Beltran's death by 1994, Tito Sotto took over on November 6 and continued hosting until 2000. By that time, it was reformatted as a magazine show.

== Hosts ==
Hosts

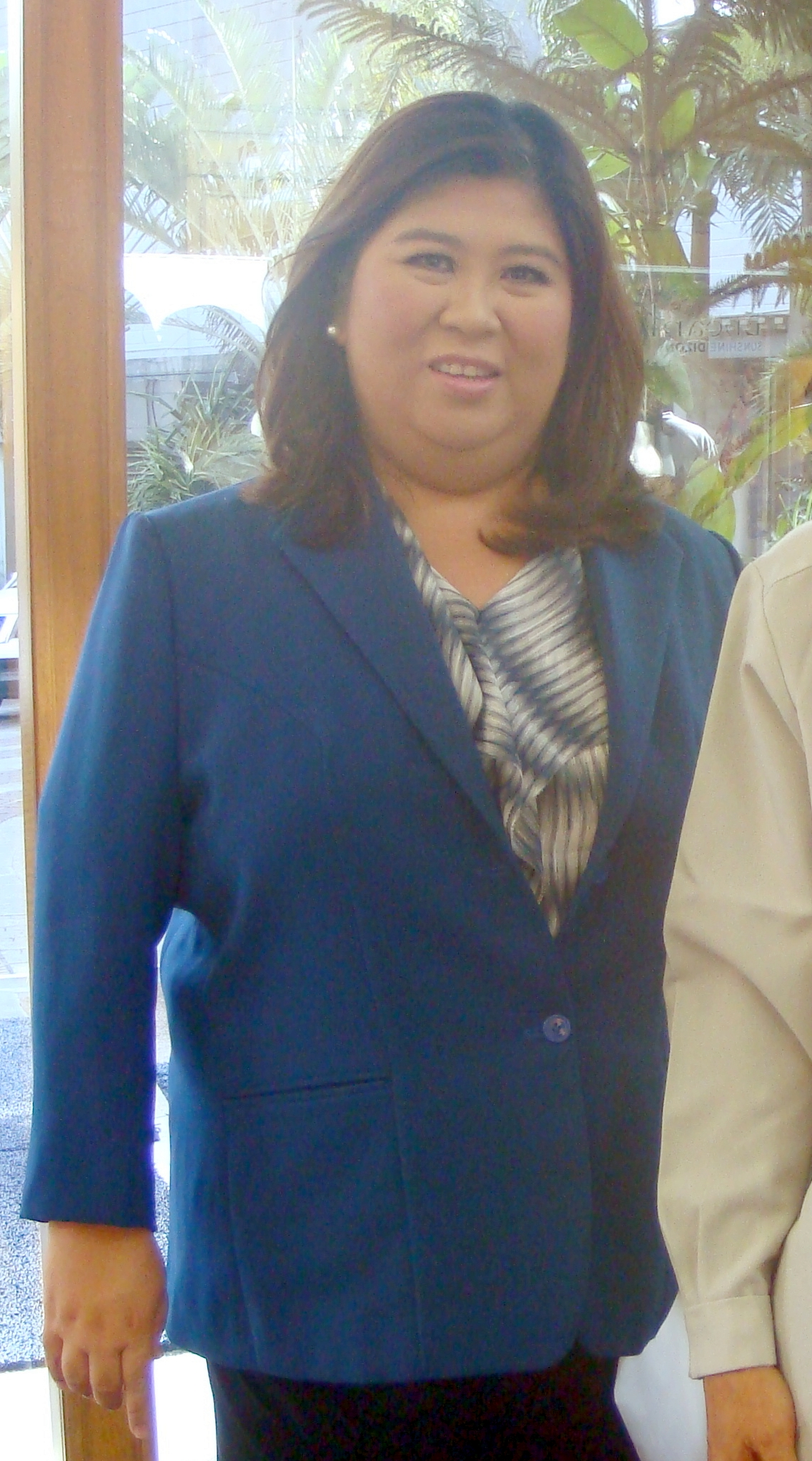
Jessica Soho

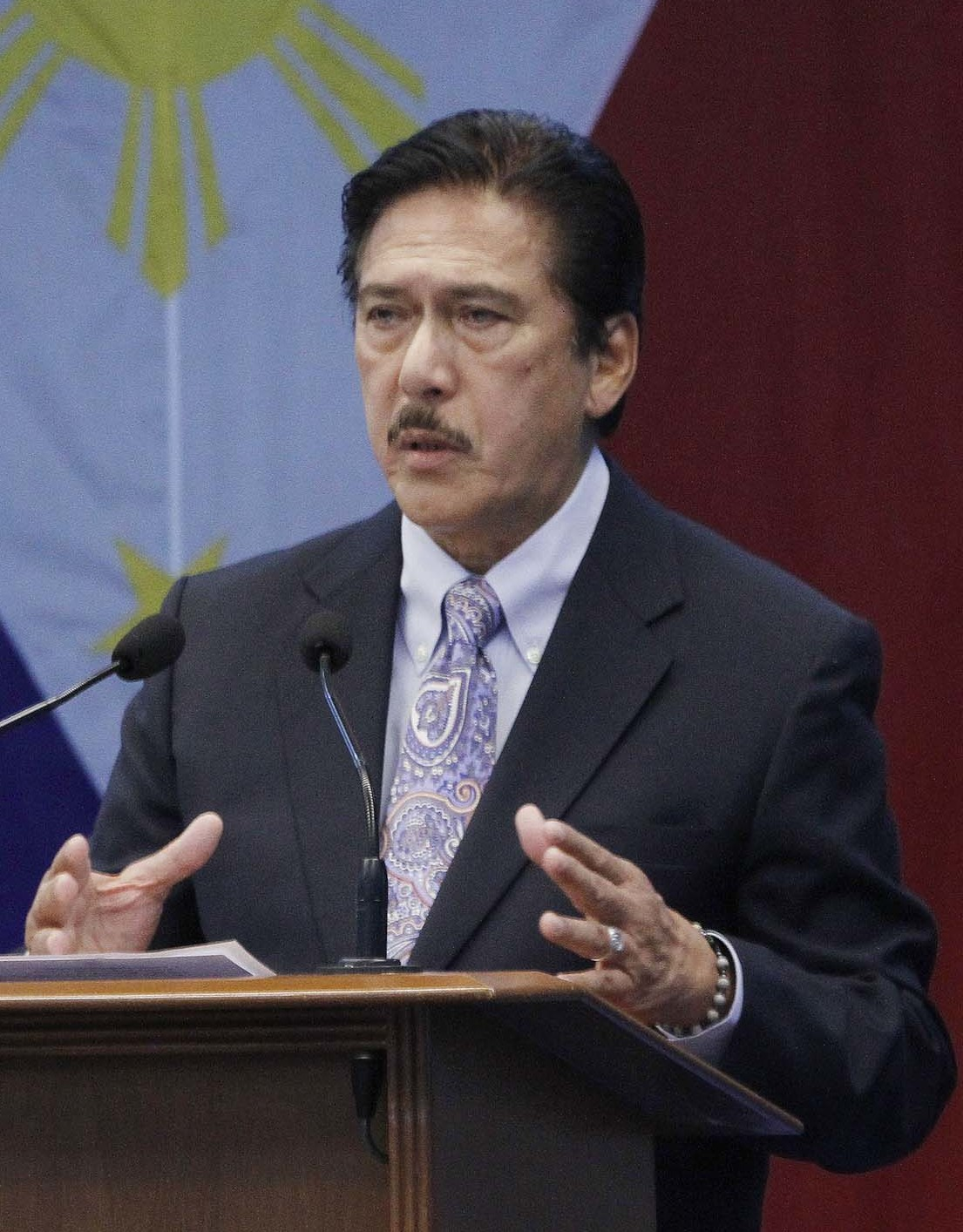
Tito Sotto

- Louie Beltran (1993–94)
- Jessica Soho (1993–2001)
- Arnold Clavio (1994–2001)
- Tito Sotto (1994–2000)

== Accolades ==
Accolades received by Brigada Siete
Year	Award	Category	Recipient	Result	Ref.
1995	9th PMPC Star Awards for Television	Best Magazine Show	Brigada Siete	Won	
1996	New York Film & TV Festivals	Best Investigative Report	"Bala O Batas"	Finalist	
1996	10th PMPC Star Awards for Television	Best Magazine Show	Brigada Siete	Won	
1997	Adboard Golden Pearl Awards		Brigada Siete	Won	
1999	Peabody Award		Child Labor Episode	Won	
