= Aredo FM =

Aredo FM اذاعة اريدو
Iraq
- Broadcast area: Government of Iraq

Programming
- Language: Arabic (mainly)
- Format: Talk; News; Sport

Ownership
- Owner: Aredo Organization

Aredo FM (Arabic: اذاعة اريدو; ) is an Iraqi public radio station but mainly an Arabic-speaking station, broadcasting in many locations throughout the Middle East on AM and FM from Baghdad. It was founded in 2008.

== History ==
Aredo FM started broadcasting in 2008, and Signing a training agreement with Radio Aredo FM – Union Center for Media Training.
