= Nagmamahal, Manay Gina =

2003 Philippine television and radio drama series

- Genre: Drama
- Developed by: Marichu Maceda
- Directed by: Television; Gina Alajar; Manny Castañeda; Albert Martinez; Soxie Topacio; Ruel S. Bayani; Jeffrey Jeturian; Joey Romero; Khryss Adalia; Radio; Lucio Maylas
- Presented by: Gina de Venecia
- Theme music composer: Edith Gallardo; Moi Ortiz
- Opening theme: "Ngumiti Ka na Muli" by Annie Quintos
- Country of origin: Philippines
- Original language: Tagalog
- No. of episodes: 138

Production
- Executive producers: Jo-Ann Banaga (television); Gypsy Baldovino (radio)
- Camera setup: Multiple-camera setup
- Running time: 30 minutes
- Production company: Sampaguita Television

Original release
- Network: GMA Network
- Release: February 24 – August 29, 2003

Nagmamahal, Manay Gina (transl. lovingly yours, mom Gina) is a 2003 Philippine television drama anthology series broadcast by GMA Network and Super Radyo DZBB. Hosted by Gina de Venecia, it premiered on February 24, 2003. The series concluded on August 29, 2003, with a total of 138 episodes.

== Overview ==
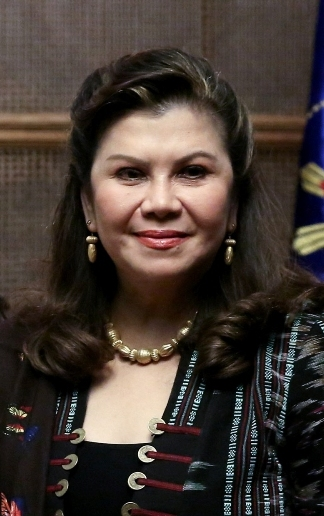
Gina de Venecia serves as a host.

The TV broadcast featured a weekly story which began on Monday, and concluded on Friday. While the radio broadcast followed the same format, it featured a different true-to-life story, and was an interactive show: listeners participated in formulating the right conclusion for each episode, every Sunday.

The radio version lasted until 2009 when de Venecia ran for candidacy in the 2010 National Election. She won the position of Congresswoman of the Fourth District of Pangasinan, and got re-elected in 2013. Now, seven years later, her term has ended, and the program was re-launched as Nagmamahal, Manay Gina in the tri-media: DZBB, Tempo, Balita and GMA Network on June 30.

== Accolades ==
Accolades received by Nagmamahal, Manay Gina
Year	Award	Category	Recipient	Result	Ref.
2003	Catholic Mass Media Award	Best Drama Series	Nagmamahal, Manay Gina	Won	
2003	Catholic Mass Media Award	Best Radio Drama	Nagmamahal, Manay Gina	Won	
2004	Catholic Mass Media Award	Best Radio Drama	Nagmamahal, Manay Gina	Won	
2008	Catholic Mass Media Award	Best Radio Drama	Nagmamahal, Manay Gina	Won	
2009	Catholic Mass Media Award	Best Radio Drama	Nagmamahal, Manay Gina	Won	
