= Louie Beltran =

Philippine journalist and columnist (1936–1994)

- Born: Luis Diaz Beltran; April 4, 1936; Manila, Commonwealth of the Philippines
- Died: September 6, 1994 (aged 58); Manila, Philippines
- Other name: Ka Louie
- Occupations: Journalist, columnist
- Spouse: Maria Antonia Salcedo Beltran
- Children: 5

Luis "Ka Louie" Diaz Beltran (April 4, 1936 – September 6, 1994) was a Filipino broadcast journalist and newspaper columnist. In 1985, he co-founded the Philippine Daily Inquirer alongside publisher Eugenia Apostol and other journalists.

In 2018, Beltran was identified by the Human Rights Victims' Claims Board as a motu proprio human rights violations victim of the Martial Law Era of former President Ferdinand Marcos.

== Career ==
Born Luis Diaz-Beltran on April 4, 1936, in Manila, he was known for his outspokenness. During martial law, when he was on the staff of the Evening News, he was one of the many journalists arrested and detained at Camp Crame. After three months of imprisonment, being bankrupt, he bred fighting cocks, calling the champion breed he developed Newshawk. He commented on current issues on radio and hosted Straight from the Shoulder, a television show which analyzed current events. He was the original host of the television show Brigada Siete. He was the first editor-in-chief of the Philippine Daily Inquirer. He also worked on other newspapers, including the Philippine Star.

After President Ferdinand Marcos was overthrown by the EDSA Revolution, Beltran became the editor-in-chief of a new newspaper, the Philippine Daily Inquirer. The pre-martial law show he hosted, Straight from the Shoulder, was revived on GMA Network. He moved from newspaper to newspaper, ending up as a columnist for the Philippine Star. It was then that he became notorious for mentioning in a column about the 1987 coup attempt that then President Corazon Aquino had been hiding under the bed during the coup. For this statement he was sued by the President for libel. Aquino went so far as to show journalists that she could not fit under her bed. Beltran, who openly expressed his belief that the President was lacking in competence, countered that his words were not meant to be taken literally, but Aquino still pursued the case against him and the Star's editor-in-chief Maximo Soliven. On October 22, 1992, the trial court ruled in Aquino's favor, sentencing the columnist and his editor to two years of imprisonment and ordering them to pay 2 million pesos in moral damages. But the Court of Appeals reversed the decision of the trial court and acquitted Beltran.

== Personal life ==
He spent his childhood in Sta. Rosa, Nueva Ecija, where he began raising game fowl, a hobby that continued throughout his life.

His son, Cito Beltran, is also a TV personality, also a columnist and the host of Agenda with Cito Beltran. He has 4 other children, Michael Beltran, Enrique Beltran, Maria Rosario Beltran Altamirano (Marissa) and Ma. Iluminada Beltran (Malu).

== Death ==
The case was thrown out of court by the Court of Appeals nearly 3 years after Beltran died of a heart attack on September 6, 1994. He was 58 years old.
