= Saksi sa Dobol B =

Philippine weekday morning radio show

- Title card since 2017
- Genre: News broadcasting
- Running time: 60 minutes
- Country of origin: Philippines
- Language: Tagalog
- Home station: DZBB
- Hosted by: Mike Enriquez (2000–22); Joel Reyes Zobel; Arnold Clavio; Orly Trinidad; Rowena Salvacion
- Original release: February 7, 2000 – present
- Opening theme: "Overture to Taras Bulba" by Franz Waxman

Saksi sa Dobol B (transl. Eyewitness on Double B) is a Philippine news broadcasting show by DZBB-AM. Originally hosted by Mike Enriquez, it premiered on February 7, 2000. It is also one of the radio programs of DZBB simulcast on GTV through the program block Dobol B TV and its online livestreaming on YouTube. It is also streaming online on DZBB's Facebook page. Joel Reyes Zobel and Rowena Salvacion currently serve as the hosts.

== Background ==
Mike Enriquez anchors his radio program Saksi sa Dobol B.

The program premiered on February 7, 2000 as a spin-off of Saksi, a television newscast that Enriquez also anchored at the time. It replaced Tapatan with Jay Sonza after its host Jay Sonza transferred to DZRH. This also marked Enriquez's return to radio. The program during 7:00 am to 8:00 am timeslot, was on the break as it was occupied by the newscast, Super Balita sa Umaga Nationwide.

On February 28, 2011, the program began its simulcast on GMA News TV along with Super Balita sa Umaga Nationwide under the Dobol B sa News TV block upon the christening of the said network. However, the simulcast ended on September 7, 2012, instead News TV aired reruns of Front Row and Reel Time on the timeslot formerly occupied by Dobol B as it would make way for a new morning show Kape at Balita in the following month.

From 2011 onwards, whenever Enriquez is not available, the news program was anchored by Melo del Prado on the first hour, then del Prado together with Joel Reyes Zobel would anchor Super Balita sa Umaga Nationwide at 7 am. After the newscast, either of del Prado or Reyes Zobel will solo-anchor the program up to 9 am.

On April 24, 2017, Dobol B sa News TV returned to GMA News TV, marking the news channel's return to simulcast radio on television after its 4-year long hiatus, with Saksi sa Dobol B returning on the said block. The block airs from 6:00 am until 11:00 am.

=== 9:00 am slot from 2014 to 2019 ===
Since 2014, at 9am the final hour had featured Arnold Clavio's blind item, Jeng-Jeng, and occasionally, Balitawit. Clavio and Ali Sotto joined Enriquez in Saksi's final hour.

In 2017, due to Dobol B sa News TV the final hour was started to be branded on television as Sino?, but on radio was still branded as part of Saksi. After this, Dobol A sa Dobol B would start at 10am.

The third hour segments would often start 30 minutes later (at 9:30), with Dobol A being sometimes pushed to as far as 10:30. This has become a running joke in the show.

In Enriquez's absence, the Sino? and Jeng-Jeng segments were anchored by Clavio, Sotto and Reyes Zobel. When one of these three were also absent, Susan Enriquez, the host of DZBB's 11am program Easy Easy Lang!, has also substituted for them.

Also in Enriquez's absence, Dobol A sa Dobol B began at 9:00 am, an hour earlier, instead of being branded as the third hour of Saksi. This was because prior to Dobol A's return in 2014, most of the segments that aired on the final hour of Saksi were mainly part of Dobol A.

=== 2019 revamp ===
Following the revamp of Dobol B sa News TV block, Saksi sa Dobol B's airtime has officially been reduced to only one hour on June 3, 2019, but the presenters and segments that occupied the affected hours remained the same. Mike Enriquez returned to hosting the radio show after being on medical leave since August 2018 (Enriquez only anchored Super Balita sa Umaga Nationwide and 24 Oras since November of the same year). Melo del Prado, who served as substitute anchor in Saksi, has started hosting his own program Melo del Prado sa Super Radyo DZBB on the 6:00am timeslot, while the 9:00am half-hour timeslot was filled by a new show Ano'ng Say N'yo? hosted by Joel Reyes-Zobel.

=== Dobol B TV ===
On February 22, 2021, as part of the rebranding of GMA News TV to GTV, the program continues to air to the newly rebranded Dobol B TV programming block.

Enriquez would return to the show before the 2022 Philippine elections, though he would disappear again on August 15th 2022. Joel Reyes Zobel and Rowena Salvacion were the most frequent substitute hosts during Enriquez's absence. Enriquez died on August 29, 2023, at the age of 71.

From January 16, 2023, to September 19, 2024, the program began its simulcast on GMA Network's newest digital channel, Pinoy Hits. The latter (along with Hallypop) signed-off the end on September 20, 2024.

== Hosts ==
- Joel Reyes Zobel (2011–present)
- Rowena Salvacion (2022–present)

== Substitute hosts ==
- Orly Trinidad (2012–present)
- Carlo Mateo (2012–present)
- Susan Enriquez (2018–present)
- Weng Dela Peña (substitute for Zobel, 2019–present)
- Kathy San Gabriel (2021–present)

== Former hosts ==
- Mike Enriquez (2000–22)
- Gani Oro (substitute for Enriquez; 2007–13)
- Arnold Clavio (2011–21)
- Melo del Prado (substitute for Enriquez; 2011–20)

== Segments ==
=== Current segments ===
- Bagong-Bagong Balita – News segment composes of news stories over the last 24 hours. Anchored by the same hosts.
- Bantay Panahon – The weather segment and radio counterpart of GMA Integrated News Weather Center (formerly IMReady: GMA Weather) segment of GMA Integrated News programs on TV. Usually after this, an interview with GMA Integrated News' then-resident meteorologist Nathaniel Cruz was aired. Sometimes, it is also broadcast as part of Super Balita sa Umaga Nationwide.
- Alam N'yo Ba? – Infotainment segment of Dobol B TV

=== Discontinued segments ===
- Bara-Bara – It is now known as Sino?
- Imbestigador sa Dobol B – A radio version of the popular investigative TV show on GMA Network, Imbestigador.
- Showbiz Saksi – Showbiz segment hosted by Eagle Riggs.
- Sino? – This segment features the trio of Mike Enriquez, Ali Sotto, and Arnold Clavio discussing blind items in politics or showbiz, which later switched its format from segment to program in 2018.
- Jeng-Jeng/Balitawit – It is a musical and often comedic commentary on the day's news by Clavio, Sotto and Enriquez. The segment is now part of Sino?, former segment which switched its format to program in 2018.
- Ano'ng Say N'yo? – Question and Answer segment hosted by Joel Reyes Zobel. Which later switched its format from segment to program in 2018.
- Sports Saksi – Sports segment hosted by Chino Trinidad, which later on became part of Super Balita sa Umaga Nationwide until June 2018 when it returned as a regular segment.

== See also ==
- Super Radyo DZBB
- GMA Integrated News
