= Dobol B TV =

Philippine television news show

- Title card since 2021
- Also known as: Dobol B sa News TV (Note: 2011–12, 2017–21); Dobol B sa GMA (Note: 2020)
- Genre: News broadcasting
- Opening theme: "DZBB Station Jingle"
- Country of origin: Philippines
- Original language: Tagalog

Production
- Production locations: GMA Network Center, Quezon City, Philippines
- Camera setup: Multiple-camera setup
- Running time: 210–330 minutes
- Production companies: RGMA Network, Inc.; GMA News

Original release
- Network: GMA News TV (2011–21); GTV (since 2021)
- Release: February 28, 2011 – present

Dobol B TV formerly known as Dobol B sa News TV, is a Philippine television news radio show block broadcast by GMA News TV and GTV. It premiered on February 28, 2011, consisting of some programs simulcast from radio station Super Radyo DZBB 594 in the form of its live video feed.

The show is streaming online on YouTube.

== Overview ==
On February 28, 2011, DZBB began its simulcast on television with the launch of Dobol B sa News TV block, coinciding with the launch of GMA News TV.

On April 24, 2017, Dobol B sa News TV returned on GMA News TV.

On April 24, 2019, ZOE Broadcasting Network and GMA / Citynet announced that the blocktime agreement between their networks was not going to be renewed and effectively ended their partnership and leased blocktime on VHF Channel 11 after almost 14 years. As a result, Channel 27 was re-utilized to broadcast GMA News TV on June 4, 2019, after 18 years of dormancy. With this transfer, Dobol B sa News TV block extended its airtime until midday. Additionally, the block started airing into the weekend beginning on the same day. The revamped lineup included new programs as well as existing Super Radyo programs that have not been aired on the block before.

From March 19 to 20, 2020, GMA News TV was put off the air in line with the enhanced community quarantine, due to the COVID-19 pandemic. Dobol B sa News TV's Melo del Prado sa Super Radyo DZBB aired temporarily on GMA Network. GMA News TV returned to broadcasting (albeit on a truncated 12–14 hour daily operation) on March 21, with the expanded edition of Dobol B sa News TV airing into the evening as its sole program. Dobol B included the afternoon programs from the station that were never been aired on television.

On February 22, 2021 Super Radyo DZBB was carried over on GMA News TV's replacement network GTV, and was renamed as Dobol B TV.

== Anchors ==
- Joel Reyes Zobel (2011–12, since 2017, Super Balita sa Umaga Nationwide, Saksi sa Dobol B)
- Melo del Prado (2011–12, since 2017, Melo del Prado sa Super Radyo DZBB, Super Balita sa Umaga Nationwide)
- Orly Trinidad (2011–12, since 2017, Buena Manong Balita)
- Weng dela Peña (since 2019, Dobol Weng sa Dobol B)
- Rowena Salvacion (since 2019, Saksi sa Dobol B, Dobol Weng sa Dobol B)
- Connie Sison (since 2019, Pinoy MD sa Super Radyo DZBB)
- Emil Sumangil (since 2020, Super Balita sa Umaga Saturday Edition)
- Kathy San Gabriel (since 2020, Super Balita sa Umaga Saturday Edition)

Substitute anchors

- Carlo Mateo (2011–12, since 2017)
- Glen Juego (since 2019)
- Lala Roque (since 2019)
- Isa Avendaño-Umali (since 2020)
- Mark Makalalad (since 2020)
- Manny Vargas (since 2019)
- Ralph Obina (since 2020)
- Rod Vega (since 2019)
- Sam Nielsen (since 2019)
- Shirley Escalante (since 2020)
- Susan Enriquez (since 2017)
- Toni Aquino (since 2022)
- Tuesday Sagun-Niu (since 2020)

Former hosts

- Arnold Clavio (2011–12, 2017–20)
- Ali Sotto (2017–20)
- Arnell Ignacio (2020–22)
- Bea Binene (2020–22)
- Benjie Liwanag (2019–21)
- Chino Trinidad (2011–12, 2017–19)
- Fernan Gulapa (2020)
- Francis "Kiko" Flores (2020–21)
- Julee Anne Mae Cabrera-Cera (2019–21)
- Kaye Morales (2020)
- Mark Salazar (2020–21)
- Mary Jean Pacheco (2023–24)
- Mike Enriquez (2011–12, 2017–22)
- Nathaniel "Mang Tani" Cruz (2017–22)
- Nimfa Ravelo (2019–20)
- Norilyn Temblor (2019–20)
- Rene Sta. Cruz (2020)
- Rolly Francia (2022)
- Tootie (2019–20)
- Ruth Castelo (2020–23)
