= Mike Enriquez =

Filipino broadcast journalist and television presenter (1951–2023)

Miguel "Mike" Enriquez
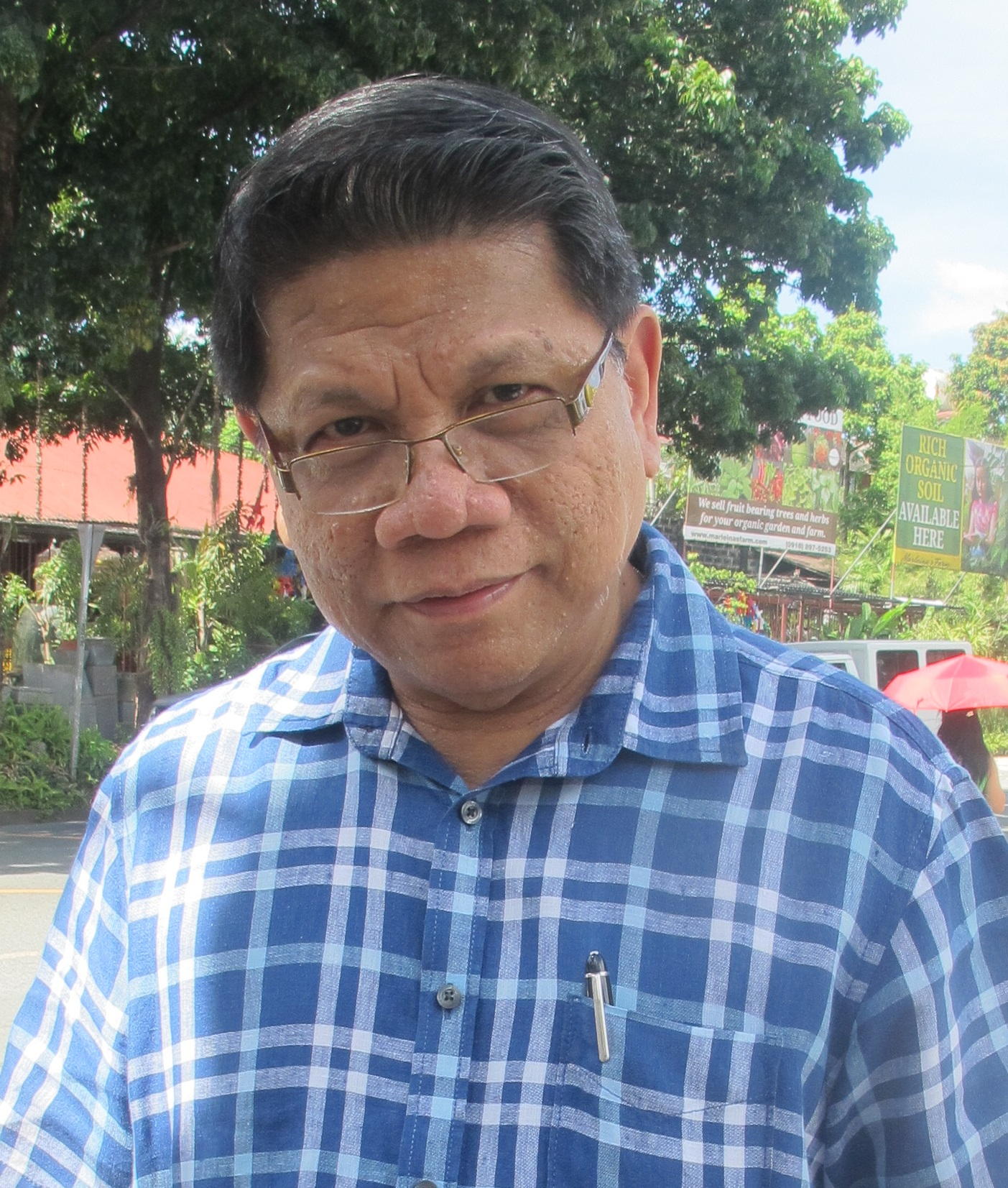
- Enriquez in White Plains, 2016
- Born: Miguel Castro Enriquez; September 29, 1951; Santa Ana, Manila, Philippines
- Died: August 29, 2023 (aged 71); Quezon City, Metro Manila, Philippines
- Resting place: Loyola Memorial Park; Marikina, Philippines
- Education: De La Salle College
- Occupations: Radio; television newscaster
- Years active: 1969–2022
- Spouse: Lizabeth Yumping (m. 1977)

Miguel "Mike" Castro Enriquez (September 29, 1951 – August 29, 2023) was a Filipino broadcast journalist and television presenter. He started his career as a radio broadcaster in 1969, and after signing with GMA Network in 1995, he became an anchor for Saksi, GMA Network News and 24 Oras. He was also the Consultant for radio operations of GMA Network, and president of the network's regional and radio subsidiary, RGMA Network Inc., and the Station Manager of Super Radyo DZBB 594 AM.

Enriquez was regarded as one of the most influential journalists in the Philippines and a "pillar" of the Philippine broadcasting industry.

== Early life and education ==
Miguel Castro Enriquez, the first of three siblings, was born on September 29, 1951, in Santa Ana, Manila. He used the term "destructive to a certain extent" to describe his curiosity-filled, active childhood. Enriquez initially wanted to become a priest, which was rejected by his parents.

Enriquez finished his elementary and high school education at La Salle Green Hills. Instead, he was enrolled at De La Salle College (now De La Salle University), taking up AB Liberal Arts and BS Commerce. Enriquez finished his degree in 1973 and taught broadcast management classes at the university.

== Career ==
=== Early career ===
Enriquez started his career in broadcasting as a staff announcer at the Manila Broadcasting Company (now MBC Media Group) in 1969. Enriquez was visiting a friend in a radio station when, as a joke, his friend introduced him to the station manager as prospective applicant. The manager invited him to do a test reading, and was offered a job on the spot.

Enriquez subsequently worked in various positions, as a broadcast reporter, a news editor, program director, and station manager, until he became manager of a medium-sized radio network. He also had stints in other radio networks such as Freedom Broadcasting Radio Network and Radio Mindanao Network (RMN), where he became vice president for the company. He was the man behind the huge success of DWKC 93.9, which stayed in the number 1 spot for so many years before he left in 1995. He was the voice behind the Mellow Touch 94.7 signature and introduction. He also became a disc jockey known as "Baby Michael" and played a cameo role as a disc jockey in Andrew E.'s 1992 movie Mahirap Maging Pogi (It's Not Easy Being Handsome).

=== With GMA Network ===
In 1994, after leaving RMN, Enriquez joined GMA Network to head its radio division and expand its radio networks, with only four originating stations at that time. In 1995, Enriquez was convinced by the network to be the anchor, in what would be his first on-cam appearance. Months later, the network executives called for him to come back; he anchored a 15-minute newscast, in the early evening slot, together with Karen Davila. The late-afternoon news program, entitled Saksi: GMA Headline Balita premiered on October 2, 1995.

In August 1998, Enriquez landed his anchor duties into the late-night newscast GMA Network News with Vicky Morales. Since his first months on Network News, they decided to change the language to Taglish, and later changed to Filipino in November that year; in August 1999, he returned to Saksi this time with Morales as co-anchors.

In February 2000, Enriquez returned to radio via Super Radyo DZBB, with his new program based on his former newscast, Saksi sa Dobol B.

In August 2000, Enriquez hosted the public affairs program entitled Imbestigador; earning him the monicker "Imbestigador ng Bayan".

On March 12, 2004, Enriquez left Saksi to become an anchor of GMA's then newly-inaugurated primetime newscast 24 Oras, reuniting with former Frontpage anchor Mel Tiangco.

Throughout his career as a news anchor, he covered numerous events ranging from the EDSA II, the September 11 attacks, the eve of the US Invasion of Iraq, the Funeral of Pope John Paul II, the aftermath of Typhoon Ondoy, the siege of Marawi, and the aftermath of Supertyphoon Haiyan in Tacloban.

Enriquez was named as one of the most child-friendly personalities by the Southeast Asian Foundation for Children and thrice consecutively by the Anak TV Seal awards.

Enriquez was also known for his trademark line "Hindi namin kayo tatantanan" (lit. transl. We will not stop coming after you) which he usually uttered at the end of stories involving crime and corruption. His habit of saying "Excuse me po!" (po being a term of politeness) after coughing or sneezing on-air was also one of his trademark lines.

Enriquez was fondly called by his fellow GMA employees by his nickname as “Booma” (named after an elephant character featured in the 1961 issue of Pinoy Komiks created by Mars Ravelo) due to his booming voice in the industry as his nickname was used in radio communications.

== Personal life ==
Enriquez was a member of the board of trustees of La Salle Green Hills and acted as the treasurer and chairman of its finance committee.

Enriquez was married to Lizabeth "Baby" Yumping, and had no children.

=== Illness and death ===
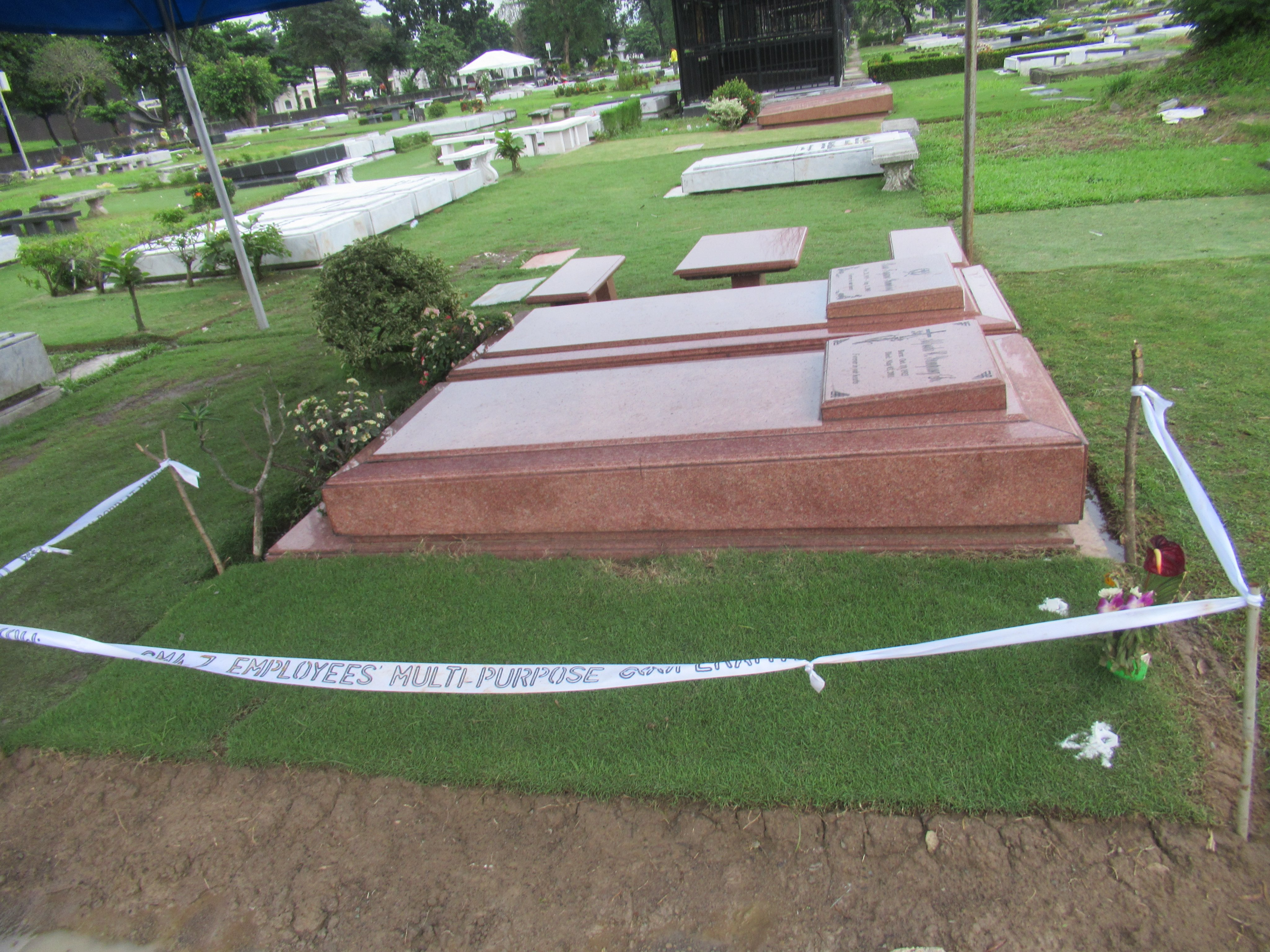
Graves of Mike Enriquez (then-unmarked) and his in-laws (Loyola Memorial Park, Marikina)

On August 22, 2018, Enriquez revealed he went on medical leave due to ailments such as kidney and heart disease and diabetes, following his absence in 24 Oras and Super Radyo DZBB. He underwent a heart bypass surgery and later returned to broadcasting on November 26.

In December 2021, Enriquez took another medical leave of absence, during which he underwent a kidney transplant. He returned to his programs on March 28, 2022, in time for GMA's coverage of the 2022 Philippine presidential election. Although, he took another medical leave three months after the elections.

Enriquez died aged 71 at 3:04 pm (UTC+8) in St. Luke's Medical Center – Quezon City on August 29, 2023. According to his widow, he suffered a cardiac arrest while undergoing a routine dialysis. His wake was held at Christ the King Parish Greenmeadows in Quezon City. Enriquez was buried on September 3 at the Loyola Memorial Park in Marikina.

== Filmography ==
=== Television ===
Mike Enriquez's television credits
Year	Title
1995–1998, 1999–2004	Saksi
1998–1999	GMA Network News
1999–2000	I-Witness
2000–2022	Imbestigador
2004–2022	24 Oras
2005–2008	Review Philippines
2007	Philippine Agenda
2011–2012, 2017–2023	Dobol B sa News TV / Dobol B TV

=== Film ===
Mike Enriquez's film credits
Year	Title	Role
1992	Mahirap Maging Pogi	Drunkard DJ
1996	'Wag na 'Wag Kang Lalayo	Himself (Anchor of Saksi)

== Awards ==
Year	Award giving body	Category	Nominated work	Results
1999	Asian Television Awards	Best Newscaster Award	—N/a	Won
1999	Golden Dove Awards	Best Male Newscaster	—N/a	Won
1999	Golden Dove Awards	Ka Doroy Valencia Broadcaster of the Year Award	—N/a	Won
2000	Asian Television Awards	Best News Presenter	—N/a	Won
2000	Golden Dove Awards	Best Newscaster For Television	—N/a	Won
2000	Golden Dove Awards	Best Public Affairs Host for Radio	—N/a	Won
2000	PMPC Star Awards for TV	Best Male Newscaster	—N/a	Won
2001	PMPC Star Awards for TV	Best Public Service Program Host	Imbestigador	Won
2002	Catholic Mass Media Awards	Best News Commentary	Saksi sa Dobol B	Won
2002	Golden Dove Awards	Best TV Newscaster Metro Manila	—N/a	Won
2002	Golden Dove Awards	Best Public Affairs Program Host	—N/a	Won
2003	National Consumers Award	Best Newscaster Award	—N/a	Won
2003	New York Festivals	Gold Medal	Saksi	Won
2004	National Consumers Award	Outstanding Television Host	—N/a	Won
2004	US Film and Video Festival	Silver Camera Award	(for a documentary focusing on Iraq War)	Won
2004	Volunteers Against Crime and Corruption	Outstanding Television Host	—N/a	Won
2013	School Press Advisers Movement Inc	Award of Excellence in the Field of Broadcasting	—N/a	Won
2014	BizNews Asia	Broadcast Excellence Award	—N/a	Won
2018	COMGUILD Media Awards for Radio and Television	Best AM Radio Anchor	—N/a	Won
2019	Animo Media Choice Awards	Best Male News Anchor on AM radio and Best Male News Anchor on Television	—N/a	Won
2022	Gawad Lasallianeta Awards	Most Outstanding Male News Anchor	—N/a	Won
2023	Annual Reader's Digest Trusted Brands Awards	Most Trusted Radio Presenter	—N/a	Won
