= DZBB-AM =

Radio station in Metro Manila, Philippines

Super Radyo Manila (DZBB)
- Quezon City; Philippines
- Broadcast area: Mega Manila and surrounding areas
- Frequency: 594 kHz
- Branding: GMA Super Radyo DZBB 594

Programming
- Language: Filipino
- Format: News, Public Affairs, Talk, Drama
- Network: Super Radyo

Ownership
- Owner: GMA Network Inc.
- Sister stations: DWLS (Barangay LS); DZBB-TV (GMA); DWDB-TV (GTV)

History
- First air date: March 1, 1950
- Former frequencies: 580 kHz (1950–1978)
- Call sign meaning: Bisig Bayan (former branding)

Technical information
- Licensing authority: NTC
- Class: A (clear frequency)
- Power: 50,000 watts
- Repeaters: See List of GMA Network radio stations

Links
- Webcast: Listen Live
- Website: gmanetwork.com/radio/dzbb

DZBB (pronounced DZ-double-B; 594 AM) Super Radyo (transl. super radio) is a radio station owned and operated by GMA Network Inc. It serves as the flagship station of the Super Radyo network and one of the assets of GMA Radio and GMA News. The station's studio is located at the 3rd floor of GMA Network Studio Annex, GMA Network Drive corner Samar Avenue, Diliman, Quezon City, while its transmitter is located along Camia Street, Barangay Panghulo, Obando, Bulacan.

Cable company Spectrum broadcasts the audio of DZBB along with that of DWLS to the United States as part of its "Filipino Channels" package

Super Radyo DZBB is the #1 AM radio station in Metro Manila, according to the Nielsen Radio Audience Measurement survey conducted in July 2025.

== History ==
=== 1950–1989: Dobol B ===
DZBB marked its inaugural broadcast, as the station's static-marred signal was wafted on the air for the first time on March 1, 1950, by Robert "Uncle Bob" Stewart, in a small office space in Calvo Building, Escolta, Binondo, Manila, with mostly second-hand equipment and an old, surplus radio transmitter. The station was then broadcasting on the frequency of 580 kHz, with the power of 10,000 watts.

Despite the scarcity of new broadcasting facilities, the station has scored many milestones with its news, Congressional coverage, breaking news, exclusives, and blow-by-blow accounts of major national events. It was also a pioneer with trendsetting shows such as Camay Theater of the Air, Cathay Broadcasting, Lovingly Yours, Helen, Kahapon Lamang, Tawag ng Tanghalan, Newscoop, and Kwentong Kutsero. Some of these shows eventually became television shows. DZBB was also the first to air live coverage of not only news and public affairs, but also entertainment and educational programmes.

In 1957, DZBB moved to its new and current home at EDSA, Quezon City.

Due to the success of DZBB, Stewart ventured into television on October 29, 1961, as DZBB-TV Channel 7 with the branding of RBS-7 (now known as GMA-7 Manila). The station was seized and closed in September 1972 due to Martial Law pursuant to Proclamation No. 1081. Two years later, due to changes in media ownership laws, Channel 7, DZBB and their other sister provincial radio and television stations were eventually sold to the triumvirate of Gilberto Duavit Sr., Menardo Jimenez and Felipe Gozon. At the same time, DZBB returned to the airwaves — through the efforts of the station's new management — under its new branding "Dobol B", which would later be rebranded to simply DZBB 594 kHz; it became a music-personality radio station and it also covered major news stories in the 1970s and 1980s. In November 1978, DZBB moved to the present frequency of 594 kHz, in response to the adoption of the 9 kHz spacing on AM radio stations in the Philippines under the Geneva Frequency Plan of 1975.

=== 1989–1999: Bisig Bayan ===
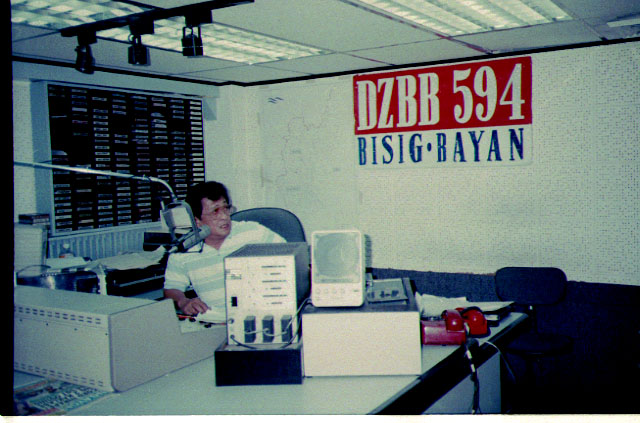
Arman Roque during his radio program in the early 1990s

The station was rebranded as "Bisig Bayan" from February 1, 1989, to January 3, 1999; and completely changed its format to news and public service. Their new identity made the station more popular to radio listeners in Metro Manila. Rafael "Paeng" Yabut, Bobby Guanzon, Lito Villarosa, Rene Jose, Rey Pacheco, Raul Virtudazo, Jimmy Gil, Arman Roque, Rose "Manang Rose" Clores, German Moreno, Inday Badiday, Helen Vela, Augusto Victa, Manolo Favis, Henry Jones Ragas and Pol Caguiat were the personalities of the Bisig Bayan years.

On January 1, 1990, DZBB reformatted into a 24-hour round-the-clock broadcasting service, in order to keep up with the pace of delivering news to its listeners, subsequently releasing Kape at Balita, a morning news/commentary/talk show hosted by Bobby Guanzon and then GMA News reporter Jessica Soho in 1991, which expanded to television the same year. In 1994, its transmitter in Obando, Bulacan doubled its power from 10 kW to 20 kW.

In January 1995, Mike Enriquez, then-Vice President for FM Radio Operations of Radio Mindanao Network transferred to GMA Network as an anchor and station manager of DZBB (later promoted as consultant for radio operations of GMA and president of RGMA Network, Inc.) and he became one of the prominent anchors who served the station for 27 years until his medical leave in 2022. Enriquez died on August 29, 2023.

=== 1999–present: Super Radyo ===
Super Radyo DZBB main logo used from 2002 until 2004.

On January 4, 1999, the station was once again rebranded as "Super Radyo DZBB 594". Much of their programming focuses on news and current events, and it still simulcasts GMA programs such as 24 Oras and Saksi. At this time, the station's transmitter was upgraded with 50 kW state of the art to strengthen the signal.

In 2010, for the first time in Philippine radio history, DZBB and its rival station DZMM of ABS-CBN Corporation made history as they joined forces in the name of public service. Two children named James and Jesus asked for help to find their missing parents named Pascual and Norma Bantillan from Bohol on a rival program on DZMM Aksyon Ngayon Global Patrol and were eventually reunited through DZBB's program Aksyon Oro Mismo.

On February 28, 2011, DZBB began its simulcast on television with the launch of Dobol B sa News TV block, coinciding with the launch of GMA News TV. The block originally included the radio station's top-rated programs such as Saksi sa Dobol B and Super Balita sa Umaga Nationwide. It ended its simulcast on September 7, 2012.

In 2014, DZBB kept its winning streak in Mega Manila as it continued to lead rival stations in ratings, according to data from Nielsen Media Research. DZBB grabbed the lead in Mega Manila in June 2014 and has since sustained leadership in the area, which it repeated in 2017, 2019, and again from 2020 up to this day.

On April 24, 2017, DZBB officially launched its new logo, its first ever jingle for the station and its newly renovated radio booth, as well as the relaunch of Dobol B TV, after almost five years of hiatus on television.

In 2020, DZBB temporarily suspended its regular programming, especially during overnight hours, in line with the enhanced community quarantine imposed by former President Rodrigo Duterte due to the COVID-19 pandemic, which replaced them with news updates and hookup to sister station DWLS. The simulcasts of Barangay Love Stories provided to be quite a hit that later in the year DZBB responded with the launch of Super Radyo Nobela, which proved to be a stunning success, not just as the return of scripted radio dramas to the station, but also as the first radio drama program to be aired live on Facebook.

On February 8, 2021, the studios of DZBB, as well as the programs simulcast over Dobol B sa News TV (later renamed to Dobol B TV with the launch of GTV), and its sister station DWLS, have permanently moved to its new radio booth at the GMA Network Annex Building.

In 2022, Toni Aquino and the late DJ Richard Enriquez—who had previously worked on flagship ABS-CBN radio stations DZMM and MOR 101.9 until 2020, and later on Eagle FM 95.5—joined DZBB with the launch of new radio programs: Sumasapuso, a daily afternoon radio drama, and Golden Memories, a late-night classical music program. Following DJ Richard’s death in 2023, Golden Memories was replaced with replay of Sumasapuso and Forever Memories (simulcast from DWLS).

== Programming ==
DZBB's programs are mostly news, current issues, and news analysis produced by GMA News. Their morning radio shows are anchored mostly by news anchors and personalities from television.

The station also has two kinds of newscasts: a main news bulletin entitled Super Balita with editions of the news bulletin aired at 7:00 a.m. PST, 11:30 a.m. PST (the weekday editions of its morning and lunchtime newscasts are simulcast to all Super Radyo stations nationwide), 3:30 p.m. PST and 10:00 p.m. PST every Monday to Friday and Bigtime Balita, the flagship evening newscast of the station, anchored by Rene Sta. Cruz aired before the simulcast of 24 Oras from GMA Network.

On some occasions, DZBB would also air live and exclusive blow-by-blow boxing coverage, especially during Manny Pacquiao's fights (alongside Super Radyo stations nationwide). As such, DZBB became the first radio station to do so (from 2007 until 2019, and again in 2021).

As of 2020, DZBB also live streams select programs on its official Facebook page.

On January 23, 2023, DZBB added a delay simulcast of the showbiz-oriented talk show Fast Talk with Boy Abunda, also from GMA Network.

On May 7, 2023, DZBB added a simulcast of the investigative public-service show Resibo: Walang Lusot ang May Atraso, also from GMA Network.

On February 5, 2025, DZBB added a delayed simulcast of the public-service talk show Cayetano in Action with Boy Abunda, also from GMA Network.

On February 15, 2025, DZBB added a simulcast of the science-travel show Science Pinas, also from GTV (alongside Super Radyo stations nationwide). As such, DZBB became as the first radio station to do so, hosted by Riana Pangindian and Mark Wei.

On August 2, 2025, DZBB added a simulcast of health show Healing Galing, which also airing on GTV and Super Radyo stations nationwide. Hosted by Dr. Edinelda O. Calvario, FCRP, PHD. This is another DZBB program that being in-tandem with network-produced Pinoy M.D. sa Super Radyo DZBB.

On September 5, 2026, DZBB added a DWLS simulcast of horror and suspense radio drama Liham ng Gabi, every Saturday evenings.

== Notable on-air personalities ==
=== Current ===
- Arnold Clavio
- Connie Sison
- Emil Sumangil
- Susan Enriquez
- Mark Salazar
- Kim Atienza
- Boy Abunda
- Renato Solidum

=== Former ===
- Mike Enriquez
- Ali Sotto
- Chino Trinidad
- Alan Peter Cayetano
- Robert "Uncle Bob" Stewart
- Pia Cayetano
- Inday Badiday
- Johnny Midnight
- German Moreno
- Jay Sonza
- Helen Vela
- Gina de Venecia
- Bobby Guanzon
- Jessica Soho
- Eddie Ilarde
- Manolo Favis
- Joey de Leon
- Julius Babao
- Bea Binene
- Arnell Ignacio
- Louie Beltran
- Joe Taruc
- Orly Mercado
- Rod Navarro
- Bert Marcelo
- Pilita Corrales

== See also ==
- GMA Network
- GTV (Philippine TV network)
- GMA News
- DWLS
- Dobol B TV
