= 2004 in Philippine television =

The following is a list of events affecting Philippine television in 2004. Events listed include television show debuts, finales, cancellations, and channel launches, closures and rebrandings, as well as information about controversies and carriage disputes.

== Events ==
- January 1 – Flordeliza Perez won the jackpot prize of one million pesos on Eat Bulaga!'s Laban o Bawi.
- January 3 – Erik Santos was hailed as the first-ever Star in a Million Grand Champion.
- January 7 – Rochelle Soyosa won the jackpot prize of one million pesos on Eat Bulaga!'s Laban o Bawi.
- January 20 – Erma Batungbacal won the jackpot prize of one million pesos on Eat Bulaga!'s Laban o Bawi.
- February 1 – Mark Herras was hailed as Ultimate Male Survivor while Jennylyn Mercado was hailed as Ultimate Female Survivor for GMA Network's reality star search StarStruck.
- March 1 - ETC was launched by Solar Entertainment Corporation as a female-oriented cable channel. On January 1, 2008, it began to lease airtime on SBN choosing to broadcast programming from its entertainment channel on UHF free-to-air television channel 21 until March 1, 2011. This partnership ended on March 2, 2011, as Solar transferred ETC to RPN on VHF free-to-air television channel 9. But on November 30, 2013, the channel returned to SBN.
- March 12 – Frontpage: Ulat ni Mel Tiangco, the early-evening national solo-anchored newscast, ended its four-year run as an early-evening national newscast and Mike Enriquez leaves the late-night newscast Saksi.
- March 13 – Rachelle Ann Go was hailed as the Search for a Star Grand Champion.
- March 15 – 24 Oras, the fourth early-evening national newscast in Filipino of GMA Network, was launched with "Frontpage" anchor Mel Tiangco and Saksi anchor Mike Enriquez. A brand-new Saksi with Emergency and Unang Hirit host Arnold Clavio joined Vicky Morales as her co-anchor and re-titled as "Saksi: Liga ng Katotohanan".
- April 12 – ABC-5 launches the slogan Iba Tayo!
- September 14 - Marites Belazon won the jackpot prize of one million pesos on Eat Bulaga!'s Laban o Bawi
- September 25 – Rowena Cahatol won the jackpot prize of one million pesos on Eat Bulaga!'s Laban o Bawi.
- November 18 – Asia's longest-running noontime show Eat Bulaga! celebrated its 25th silver anniversary via a TV Special called Eat Bulaga Silver Special with a grand celebration held at the Expo Filipino in Clark Air Base, Angeles City, Pampanga.
- November 22 - TV Patrol became TV Patrol World and Julius Babao was joined by Karen Davila and Ted Failon, replacing Korina Sanchez during the first TV Patrol era. Sanchez replaced its original anchor Noli de Castro three years ago due to his election as senator and became vice president this year. Erwin Tulfo and Bernadette Sembrano replaced Davila and Cito Beltran on ABS-CBN Insider.

== Premieres ==
Date	Show
January 12	The Truth on ABS-CBN 2
January 20	American Idol season 3 on ABC 5
February 1	Team Explorer on Studio 23
February 2	Te Amo, Maging Sino Ka Man on GMA 7
February 2	Survivor: All-Stars on Studio 23
February 7	Kapag May Katwiran... Ipaglaban Mo! on RPN 9
February 8	At Home Ka Dito on ABS-CBN 2
February 9	Starry, Starry Night on GMA 7
February 9	Loving You on GMA 7
February 14	TV Patrol Sabado on ABS-CBN 2
February 15	Partners with Mel Tiangco on GMA 7
February 21	MTB: Ang Saya Saya on ABS-CBN 2
February 22	PBA on ABC on ABC 5
February 23	INQ TV on ABC 5
February 23	Marina on ABS-CBN 2
February 23	Westside Story on ABS-CBN 2
February 25	Yes, Yes Show! on ABS-CBN 2
February 28	ABCinema on ABC 5
March 1	Naruto on ABS-CBN 2
March 1	Irene on GMA 7
March 1	Sarah the Teen Princess on ABS-CBN 2
March 1	Ikaw sa Puso Ko on GMA 7
March 1	Star Circle Quest on ABS-CBN 2
March 1	Wazzup Wazzup on Studio 23
March 6	Nginiiig! on ABS-CBN 2
March 7	Lukso ng Dugo on ABS-CBN 2
March 8	Hanggang Kailan on GMA 7
March 8	Love Letter on GMA 7
March 15	24 Oras on GMA 7
March 15	Saksi: Liga ng Katotohanan on GMA 7
March 20	StarStruck Kids on GMA 7
March 20	Sing Galing: The Trio-oke Showdown on ABC 5
March 22	Lucy of the Southern Rainbow on GMA 7
March 22	Love Storm on GMA 7
March 22	Stage 1: The Starstruck Playhouse on GMA 7
March 22	Mangarap Ka on ABS-CBN 2
March 26	StarStruck: Stage 1 Live! on GMA 7
March 27	Art Angel on GMA 7
March 29	Guardian Angel on GMA 7
April 3	Lovely Day on GMA 7
April 12	Big News on ABC 5
April 12	Sentro on ABC 5
April 12	Big News Ngayon on ABC 5
April 12	Amazing Twins on ABC 5
April 12	Scent of Love on ABC 5
April 12	Buhay Beauty Queen on ABC 5
April 12	Fireworks on ABC 5
April 13	Strangebrew on Studio 23
April 17	Art Jam on ABS-CBN 2
April 20	Puso o Pera on ABC 5
April 24	Salamat Dok on ABS-CBN 2
April 25	Medabots on GMA 7
May 1	At Your Service-Star Power on GMA 7
May 9	TV Patrol Linggo on ABS-CBN 2
May 10	Jojo A. All the Way! on RJTV 29
May 15	The Probe Team Documentaries on ABC 5
May 17	It's Chowtime on IBC 13
May 23	ASAP Fanatic on ABS-CBN 2
May 24	Endless Love: Summer Scent on GMA 7
May 30	Rated K on ABS-CBN 2
May 31	Good Morning, Kris on ABS-CBN 2
June 1	Reporter's Notebook on GMA 7
June 6	Seasons of Love on ABS-CBN 2
June 7	Victim Extreme on ABS-CBN 2
June 7	News Tonight on IBC 13
June 13	SOP Gigsters on GMA 7
June 14	Sandara's Romance on ABS-CBN 2
June 14	Marinara on GMA 7
June 19	EK Channel on ABS-CBN 2
June 21	Tokyo Underground on ABS-CBN 2
June 26	Hoy Gising! Kapamilya on ABS-CBN 2
June 28	30 Days on GMA 7
July 3	Pinoy Pop Superstar on GMA 7
July 3	Bitoy's Funniest Videos on GMA 7
July 5	Dear Boys on ABS-CBN 2
July 5	Ninja Boy Rantaro on ABC 5
July 5	Good Morning, Teacher on GMA 7
July 5	Samurai Deeper Kyo on Studio 23
July 12	Hiram on ABS-CBN 2
July 12	SCQ Reload on ABS-CBN 2
July 12	Power Rangers Wild Force on ABS-CBN 2
July 12	Bible Guide on UNTV 37
July 12	Ang Dating Daan on UNTV 37
July 12	What's Up Doc? on UNTV 37
July 12	Bahala si Tulfo on UNTV 37
July 12	Ads Unlimited on UNTV 37
July 12	Up Close on UNTV 37
July 12	Bread N' Butter on UNTV 37
July 12	Pangarap ng Puso on UNTV 37
July 12	Ayon sa Bibliya on UNTV 37
July 12	Workshop on TV on UNTV 37
July 12	Barangay Showbiz on UNTV 37
July 12	Ano sa Palagay Mo? on UNTV 37
July 12	Kids at Work on UNTV 37
July 12	Kapitbahay at Kapitbisig on UNTV 37
July 12	Sound Connections on UNTV 37
July 12	Make My Day with Larry Henares on UNTV 37
July 12	Truth in Focus on UNTV 37
July 12	Ito Ang Balita on UNTV 37
July 13	Mr. Fix It on UNTV 37
July 14	Happy Tales on GMA 7
July 14	FAQ's on UNTV 37
July 14	Teleskwela on UNTV 37
July 15	Outlaw Star on GMA 7
July 15	Tapatan with Jay Sonza: Bayan ang Humatol on UNTV 37
July 16	Hometown: Dito Po Sa Amin on UNTV 37
July 16	KNC Show on UNTV 37
July 17	Kulay Pinoy on UNTV 37
July 18	Weird Doctrines on UNTV 37
July 18	Bible Exposition on UNTV 37
July 18	Biblically Speaking on UNTV 37
July 19	Sunshine of Love on ABS-CBN 2
July 19	Twin Sisters on GMA 7
July 26	Four Sisters on ABS-CBN 2
July 31	Love in the City on ABS-CBN 2
August 1	3R (Respect, Relax, Respond) on GMA 7
August 1	Mel & Joey on GMA 7
August 2	Mulawin on GMA 7
August 9	First Love on ABS-CBN 2
August 16	Maid in Heaven on ABS-CBN 2
August 16	Joyride on GMA 7
August 17	Secrets with Juliana Palermo on ABC 5
August 23	Cinderella on GMA 7
August 23	Cowboy Bebop on GMA 7
August 28	Born Diva on ABS-CBN 2
August 28	Wag Kukurap on GMA 7
August 30	Duel Masters on ABS-CBN 2
September 4	Out! on GMA 7
September 8	Y Speak on Studio 23
September 11	Maestra Viajes on UNTV 37
September 11	Serbisyo Publiko on UNTV 37
September 13	Victim Undercover on ABS-CBN 2
September 14	Bahay Mo Ba 'To? on GMA 7
September 14	The Insider on ETC
September 17	Survivor: Vanuatu on Studio 23
September 18	Pirated CD, Celebrity Disguise on ABS-CBN 2
September 20	Promise on ABS-CBN 2
September 27	Forever in My Heart on GMA 7
September 27	DMV: Dream Music Videos on ABC 5
September 27	Dream FM Playlist on ABC 5
October 4	Rune Soldier on GMA 7
October 9	Sing Galing ni Pops on ABC 5
October 11	Krystala on ABS-CBN 2
October 11	D'X-Man on UNTV 37
October 11	Morning Star on ABS-CBN 2
October 11	Newsbeat on Net 25
October 11	GetBackers on ABS-CBN 2
October 11	Ragnarok the Animation on ABS-CBN 2
October 17	Naks! on GMA 7
October 18	Leya, ang Pinakamagandang Babae sa Ilalim ng Lupa on GMA 7
October 18	Snow Angel on GMA 7
October 23	Fruits Basket on ABS-CBN 2
November 7	Kapuso Mo, Jessica Soho on GMA 7
November 14	Cyborg 009 on ABS-CBN 2
November 15	Lovers in Paris on ABS-CBN 2
November 22	TV Patrol World on ABS-CBN 2
November 22	Showbiz No. 1 on ABS-CBN 2
December 6	Daisy Siete: May Bukas Pa ang Kahapon on GMA 7
December 12	Love Hina on GMA 7
December 13	Spirits on ABS-CBN 2
December 14	Full Metal Panic! on GMA 7
December 20	Gundam Seed on ABS-CBN 2
December 20	White Book of Love on GMA 7

=== Unknown dates ===
- July: Diretsahan on ABC 5
- August:
  - Entertainment Tonight on ETC
  - One Tree Hill on ETC
  - NBC Nightly News on ETC
  - The Today Show on ETC
  - Dateline on ETC
  - Seinfeld on ETC
  - Significant Others on ETC
  - Change of Heart on ETC
- November:
  - Feel 100% on ABS-CBN 2

=== Unknown ===
- SMC's Dayriser on GMA 7
- Kerygma TV on SBN 21
- Friends Again on SBN 21
- Jesus: Lord Of The Nations on SBN 21
- Oras ng Katotohanan on SBN 21
- Tinig ng Kanayng Pagbabalik on SBN 21
- Legal Forum on ZOE TV 11
- New Life TV Shopping on ZOE TV 11
- Serbisyong Legal on ZOE TV 11
- America's Next Top Model on Studio 23
- Citizen Pinoy on ANC
- Weekend Love on ABS-CBN 2
- Kaya Mo Ba 'To? on ABS-CBN 2
- Trip Kita, The Search for the Next Colgate Endorser on ABS-CBN 2
- Silip; Sining sa Lipunan on ABS-CBN 2
- Kape't Pandasal on ABS-CBN 2
- Impact with Max Soliven on ABS-CBN 2
- Masked Rider Ryuki on ABS-CBN 2
- 100 Deeds for Eddie McDowd on ABS-CBN 2
- Black Hole High on ABS-CBN 2
- Sports Desk on Solar Sports
- EZ Shop on NBN 4/RPN 9/IBC 13
- Home Shopping Network on IBC 13
- Serbis on the Go on IBC 13
- Manny Pacquiao Sports Idol on IBC 13
- Frontlines on ABC 5
- Art Is Kool on ABC 5
- Chikiting Patrol on ABC 5
- KNN: Kabataan News Network on ABC 5
- How 'Bout My Place on ABC 5
- Island Flavors on ABC 5
- Community Mass On ABC on ABC 5
- Three Blind Dates on ABC 5
- Pops Talk Show on ABC 5
- Look Who's Talking on ABC 5
- DMV: Dream Music Videos on ABC 5
- Kakampi Mo Ang Batas on UNTV 37
- Chika Mo, Chika Ko on UNTV 37
- Mom Ko To! on ABC 5
- World Made Flash on ABC 5
- Ringside on ABC 5
- Crouching Tiger on ABC 5
- Fear Factor on ABC 5
- Gagsters on ABC 5
- Lizzie McGuire on ABC 5
- The Apprentice with Donald Trump on ABC 5
- The Basketball Show on ABC 5
- The Outsiders on ABC 5
- TNA Impact! on ABC 5
- Insight Inside on RPN 9
- Oh Yes, Johnny's Back! on RPN 9
- Barkada Trip on Studio 23
- The Planet on Net 25
- Ilaw ng Kaligtasan on Net 25
- Mr. Bean: The Animated Series on ABS-CBN 2
- Isabella on ABS-CBN 2

== Returning or renamed programs ==
Show	Last aired	Retitled as/Season/Notes	Channel	Return date
Oh No! It's Johnny!	1999 (ABS-CBN)	Oh Yes! Johnny's Back!	RPN	January 10
Partners Mel and Jay	2004	Partners with Mel Tiangco	GMA Network	February 15
Masayang Tanghali Bayan	2004	MTB: Ang Saya Saya	ABS-CBN	February 21
Philippine Basketball Association	2003 (IBC / NBN; season 29: "Reinforced Conference")	Same (Fiesta Conference)	ABC	February 22
ABCinema	1998	Same	ABC	February 28
Saksi	2004	Saksi: Liga ng Katotohanan	GMA Network	March 15
The Big News	2004	Big News	ABC	April 12
The Probe Team	2003 (GMA)	The Probe Team Documentaries	ABC	May 15
IBC News Tonite	2004	News Tonight	IBC	June 7
Hoy Gising!	2001	Hoy Gising! Kapamilya	ABS-CBN	June 26
Tapatan with Jay Sonza	2001 (RPN)	Tapatan with Jay Sonza: Bayan ang Humatol	UNTV	July 15
Star in a Million	2004	Same (season 2)	ABS-CBN	July 17
Philippine Basketball Association	2004 (Fiesta Conference)	Same (season 30: "Philippine Cup")	ABC	October 3
Sing Galing!	2004	Sing Galing ni Pops	ABC	October 9
StarStruck	2004	Same (season 2)	GMA Network	October 11
Star Circle Quest	2004	Same (season 2)	ABS-CBN	October 11
National Basketball Association	2004 (IBC)	Same (2004–05 season)	RPN	November 4
Next Level Na! Game Ka Na Ba?	2004	Pilipinas, Game KNB?	ABS-CBN	November 15
TV Patrol	2004	TV Patrol World	ABS-CBN	November 22
P.O.P.S.: Pops On Primetime Saturday	1996	POPS!	ABC	Unknown

== Programs transferring networks ==
Date	Show	No. of seasons	Moved from	Moved to
January 10	Oh No! It's Johnny!	—N/a	ABS-CBN	RPN (as Oh Yes! Johnny's Back!)
February 22	Philippine Basketball Association	30	NBN/IBC	ABC
April 13	Strangebrew	—N/a	UNTV	Studio 23
May 15	The Probe Team Documentaries	—N/a	GMA Network	ABC
July 12	Ito Ang Balita	—N/a	SBN	UNTV
July 12	Ang Dating Daan	—N/a	SBN	UNTV
July 12	Bible Guide	—N/a	ABC	UNTV
July 15	Tapatan with Jay Sonza	—N/a	RPN	UNTV (as Tapatan with Jay Sonza: Bayan ang Humatol)
November 4	National Basketball Association	—N/a	IBC	RPN
November 14	Cyborg 009	—N/a	IBC	ABS-CBN
Unknown	Art Is Kool	—N/a	GMA Network	ABC

== Finales ==
- January 3: Star in a Million (season 1) (ABS-CBN 2)
- January 9: Eternity: A Chinese Ghost Story (ABS-CBN 2)
- February 1:
  - Feel at Home (ABS-CBN 2)
  - StarStruck season 1 (GMA 7)
- February 6:
  - At the Dolphin Bay (GMA 7)
  - Kachorra (GMA 7)
- February 7: Buttercup (ABS-CBN 2)
- February 8: Partners Mel and Jay (GMA 7)
- February 15: Ispup (ABC 5)
- February 16: The Big Night (ABC 5)
- February 7: Buttercup (ABS-CBN 2)
- February 18: Whattamen (ABS-CBN 2)
- February 20:
  - Masayang Tanghali Bayan (ABS-CBN 2)
  - Retro TV (IBC 13)
  - The Truth (ABS-CBN 2)
  - Friday Box Office (ABC 5)
- February 25: Philippines' Most Wanted (ABC 5)
- February 27:
  - Walang Hanggan (GMA 7)
  - Funny Wild Girl (GMA 7)
  - Next Level Na! Game Ka Na Ba? (ABS-CBN 2)
- February 28: Knowledge Power (ABS-CBN 2)
- March 5:
  - Narito ang Puso Ko (GMA 7)
  - Endless Love: Winter Sonata (GMA 7)
- March 12:
  - Frontpage: Ulat ni Mel Tiangco (GMA 7)
  - Saksi (GMA 7)
- March 13:
  - Search for a Star (GMA 7)
  - Sing Galing! (ABC 5)
- March 19:
  - My Annette (GMA 7)
  - Starry, Starry Night (GMA 7)
- March 20:
  - Berks (ABS-CBN 2)
  - Art is-Kool (GMA 7)
- March 26: Loving You (GMA 7)
- March 27: Super Yoyo (GMA 7)
- April 7:
  - The Big News (ABC 5)
  - Balitang Balita (ABC 5)
- April 11: Live on 5 (ABC 5)
- April 18: Magandang Umaga, Bayan Weekend (ABS-CBN 2)
- May 10: Survivor: All-Stars (Studio 23)
- May 20: Maria del Carmen (GMA 7)
- May 21:
  - Love Storm (GMA 7)
  - Guardian Angel (GMA 7)
- May 23: Sharon (ABS-CBN 2)
- May 27: American Idol season 3 (ABC 5)
- May 28: Morning Girls with Kris and Korina (ABS-CBN 2)
- May 30: Lukso ng Dugo (ABS-CBN 2)
- June 4: IBC News Tonite (IBC 13)
- June 5: Star Circle Quest season 1 (ABS-CBN 2)
- June 11: Twin Hearts (GMA 7)
- June 19: Simpleng Hiling (ABS-CBN 2)
- June 26:
  - StarStruck Kids (GMA 7)
  - Celebrity Turns (GMA 7)
- July 2: Paulina (GMA 7)
- July 9:
  - Sana'y Wala Nang Wakas (ABS-CBN 2)
  - Ito Ang Balita (SBN 21)
  - Manic Pop Thrill (UNTV 37)
  - Oras ng Himala (UNTV 37)
  - UNTV Music Videos (UNTV 37)
- July 11:
  - Playback (UNTV 37)
  - PMS (UNTV 37)
- July 14: Flame of Recca (GMA 7)
- July 16: Endless Love: Summer Scent (GMA 7)
- July 24: Click (GMA 7)
- July 25: Partners with Mel Tiangco (GMA 7)
- July 30:
  - Hanggang Kailan (GMA 7)
  - Sine'skwela (ABS-CBN 2)
- August 3: Math-Tinik (ABS-CBN 2)
- August 12: Stage 1: The Starstruck Playhouse (GMA 7)
- August 13:
  - Solita Mi Amor (ABS-CBN 2)
  - 30 Days (GMA 7)
  - StarStruck: Stage 1 Live! (GMA 7)
- August 21:
  - Star in a Million (season 2) (ABS-CBN 2)
  - Kakabakaba Adventures (GMA 7)
- September 3: Celebrity DAT Com (IBC 13)
- September 7: All Together Now (GMA 7)
- September 10: Basta't Kasama Kita (ABS-CBN 2)
- September 17:
  - Te Amo, Maging Sino Ka Man (GMA 7)
  - Sunshine of Love (ABS-CBN 2)
  - Four Sisters (ABS-CBN 2)
- September 24:
  - Love Letter (GMA 7)
  - Marinara (GMA 7)
- October 2: Sing Galing: The Trio-oke Showdown (ABC 5)
- October 8:
  - Mangarap Ka (ABS-CBN 2)
  - Good Morning, Kris (ABS-CBN 2)
  - World Report Filipino Edition (Net 25)
- October 15:
  - Twin Sisters (GMA 7)
  - Ikaw sa Puso Ko (GMA 7)
- October 22: Sarah the Teen Princess (ABS-CBN 2)
- October 24: Love in the City (ABS-CBN 2)
- November 12: Marina (ABS-CBN 2)
- November 13: Born Diva (ABS-CBN 2)
- November 19:
  - TV Patrol (ABS-CBN 2)
  - Maid in Heaven (ABS-CBN 2)
  - First Love (ABS-CBN 2)
- November 28: Epol/Apple (ABS-CBN 2)
- December 4: Out! (GMA 7)
- December 10: It Might Be You (ABS-CBN 2)
- December 13: Survivor: Vanuatu (Studio 23)
- December 17: Snow Angel (GMA 7)
- December 31:
  - TV Patrol Tuguegarao (ABS-CBN TV-3 Tuguegarao)
  - TV Patrol Iligan (ABS-CBN TV-2 Iligan)
  - Good Morning, Teacher (GMA 7)

=== Unknown dates ===
- April: Westside Story (ABS-CBN 2)
- July: Buhay Beauty Queen (ABC 5)

=== Unknown ===
- All About You (GMA 7)
- In Touch with Charles Stanley (GMA 7)
- Lakas Magsasaka (GMA 7)
- Detek Kids (ABS-CBN 2)
- Silip; Sining sa Lipunan (ABS-CBN 2)
- Digital LG Quiz (GMA 7)
- Ang Dating Daan (SBN 21)
- Ang Tamang Daan (SBN 21)
- Edgemont (ZOE TV 11)
- Fantasy (ABS-CBN 2)
- On-Air (ABC 5)
- SINGLE (ABC 5)
- Game Channel Extreme (ABC 5)
- Kool on Kam (ABC 5)
- 2 Years Vacation w/ Dinosaurs (ABC 5)
- Amazing Twins (ABC 5)
- Bugs (ABC 5)
- Crouching Tiger
- Cyborg Kuro-chan (ABC 5)
- ER (ABC 5)
- Fireworks (ABC 5)
- Gagsters (ABC 5)
- MADtv (ABC 5)
- Normal, Ohio (ABC 5)
- Sailor Moon (ABC 5)
- Scent of Love (ABC 5)
- That '70s Show (ABC 5)
- The New Adventures of Robin Hood (ABC 5)
- The Outsiders (ABC 5)
- Working (ABC 5)
- Armor of God (RJTV 29)
- BYK101 (IBC 13)
- LakbayTV (IBC 13)
- Game Channel (IBC 13)
- Travel: Philippines (IBC 13)
- Powerline (IBC 13)
- Manny Pacquiao Sports Idol (IBC 13)
- Sagot Kita, Sagot Ka ng Purina (IBC 13)
- 9-Ball Tirador (IBC 13)
- Nina (IBC 13)
- Strings of Hearts (IBC 13)
- Magbuhay Professional (NBN 4)
- Patrol 117 (NBN 4)
- Largo (RPN 9)
- How 'Bout My Place (RPN 9)
- Novartis Payo ni Doc (RPN 9)
- Madam Ratsa Live! (RPN 9)
- The Doctor is In (RPN 9)
- Islands Life (RPN 9)
- OPTV (RPN 9)
- Isabella (ABS-CBN 2)
- Por ti (ABS-CBN 2)
- Promise (ABS-CBN 2)
- Pirated CD, Celebrity Disguise (ABS-CBN 2)
- To The Max (ABS-CBN 2)
- Trip Kita, The Search for the Next Colgate Endorser (ABS-CBN 2)
- Teysi (ABS-CBN 2)
- Dong Puno Tonight (ABS-CBN 2)
- Sapul Kayo Diyan! (ABS-CBN 2)
- Special Assignment (ABS-CBN 2)
- Tara Tena (ABS-CBN 2)
- Victim (ABS-CBN 2)
- Weekend Love (ABS-CBN 2)
- Silip; Sining sa Lipunan (ABS-CBN 2)
- Impact with Max Soliven (ABS-CBN 2)
- Bread of Life (ABS-CBN 2)
- Home Grown (Net 25)
- Our House (Net 25)
- Wheel 2000 (Net 25)
- L'il Horrors (Net 25)
- Audio File (Net 25)
- Beyond 2000 (Net 25)
- Call for Help (Net 25)
- Cyberdoodoo (Net 25)
- NET Café (Net 25)
- Next Step (Net 25)
- www.com (Net 25)
- Zip File (Net 25)
- Eat My Shorts (UNTV 37)
- In the Raw (UNTV 37)
- Out of Time (UNTV 37)
- Roam (UNTV 37)
- Kapitbahay at Kapitbisig (UNTV 37)
- Luisa (ABS-CBN 2)
- Astro Boy (ABS-CBN 2)
- Cyborg 009 (ABS-CBN 2)
- Dear Boys (ABS-CBN 2)
- Digimon Frontier (ABS-CBN 2)
- Duel Masters (ABS-CBN 2)
- Fruits Basket (ABS-CBN 2)
- Lady Lady (ABS-CBN 2)
- Masked Rider Agito (ABS-CBN 2)
- Tokyo Underground (ABS-CBN 2)
- Dragon Warrior (ABS-CBN 2)
- Del Monte Kitchenomics (ABS-CBN 2)

== Networks ==
=== Launches ===
- January 17: Sports Plus
- January 18: Animax Asia
- March 1 : ETC
- June 6 : Living Asia Channel

=== Closures ===
==== Unknown ====
- DBS 35

== Births ==
- January 1 - Dhao Mac Macasipot, dancer
- January 26 – Jhoanna Robles, singer and actress
- January 27 –
  - Xyriel Manabat, actress
  - Francine Diaz, actress
- February 20 – Franzell Placido, student and player
- March 3 - Izzy Canillo, actor
- March 8 - Brenna Garcia, actress
- March 12 - Darlene Vibares, singer
- March 18 - Avery Balasbas, actress
- March 26 -
  - Dani Porter, actress
  - Awra Briguela, actor and singer
- April 16 - Elha Nympha, singer
- May 9 - Sheena Catacutan, singer and dancer
- May 18 - Olive May, singer and actress
- May 29 - Noel Comia Jr., actor, model, singer, and former host of Team Yey!
- July 29 - Juan Gabriel Tiongson, son of Sweet Plantado Tiongson of The CompanY & Trumpets Playshop Kids
- August 19 - Mona Alawi, actress and model
- September 13 - Criza Taa, actress
- October 1 - Raven Cajuguiran, actress and former host of Team Yey!
- October 6 - Cha-Cha Cañete, actress and singer
- October 9 - Althea Ablan, actress
- October 13 - Luke James Alford, singer, actor and former host of Team Yey!
- November 7 - Yohan Louis Agoncillo
- November 13 - Elijah Alejo, actress
- November 14 -
  - Veyda Inoval, actress
  - Rabin Angeles, actor and influencer
- November 21 - Lyca Gairanod, singer and actress
- December 15 - Clarence Delgado, actor
- December 25 - Sam Shoaf, singer, actor and former host of Team Yey!

== Deaths ==
- February 18 - Frankie Evangelista, 69, former radio-TV anchor (born July 24, 1934)
- February 21 - Nestor de Villa, 75, former actor (born July 6, 1928)
- March 4 - Halina Perez, 22, former sexy star (born December 11, 1981)
- April 27 - Larry Silva, 66, former actor and comedian (born 1937)
- July 31 - Roger Mariano, 44, former DZJC anchor (born 1960)
- August 14 - Bomber Moran, 59, former actor (born October 18, 1944)
- August 30 - Dely Atay-Atayan, 90, former comedian (born March 17, 1914)
- September 24 - Christopher Misajon, 31, former GMA Iloilo correspondent (born 1973)
- September 26 - Beda Orquejo, 55, TV Director/Editor/Cameraman of Family Rosary Crusade (born 1948)
- October 4 - Rio Diaz, 45, former TV host/actress/beauty queen (born 1959)
- November 10 - Katy de la Cruz, 97, singer, actress, known as "Queen of Bodabil" (born 1907)
- November 19 - George Canseco, 70, Filipino song composer (born April 23, 1934)
- December 14 - Fernando Poe, Jr., 65, Actor, Director, Producer and politician (b. 1939)

== See also ==
- 2004 in television
