= List of GMA Network original programming =

GMA Network (Global Media Arts or simply GMA) is a free-to-air commercial broadcasting television and radio network in the Philippines, owned by GMA Network Inc. and headquartered at GMA Network Center in Diliman, Quezon City. The following is a list of original programming by GMA Network since it began its television operations on October 29, 1961.

== Current original programming ==
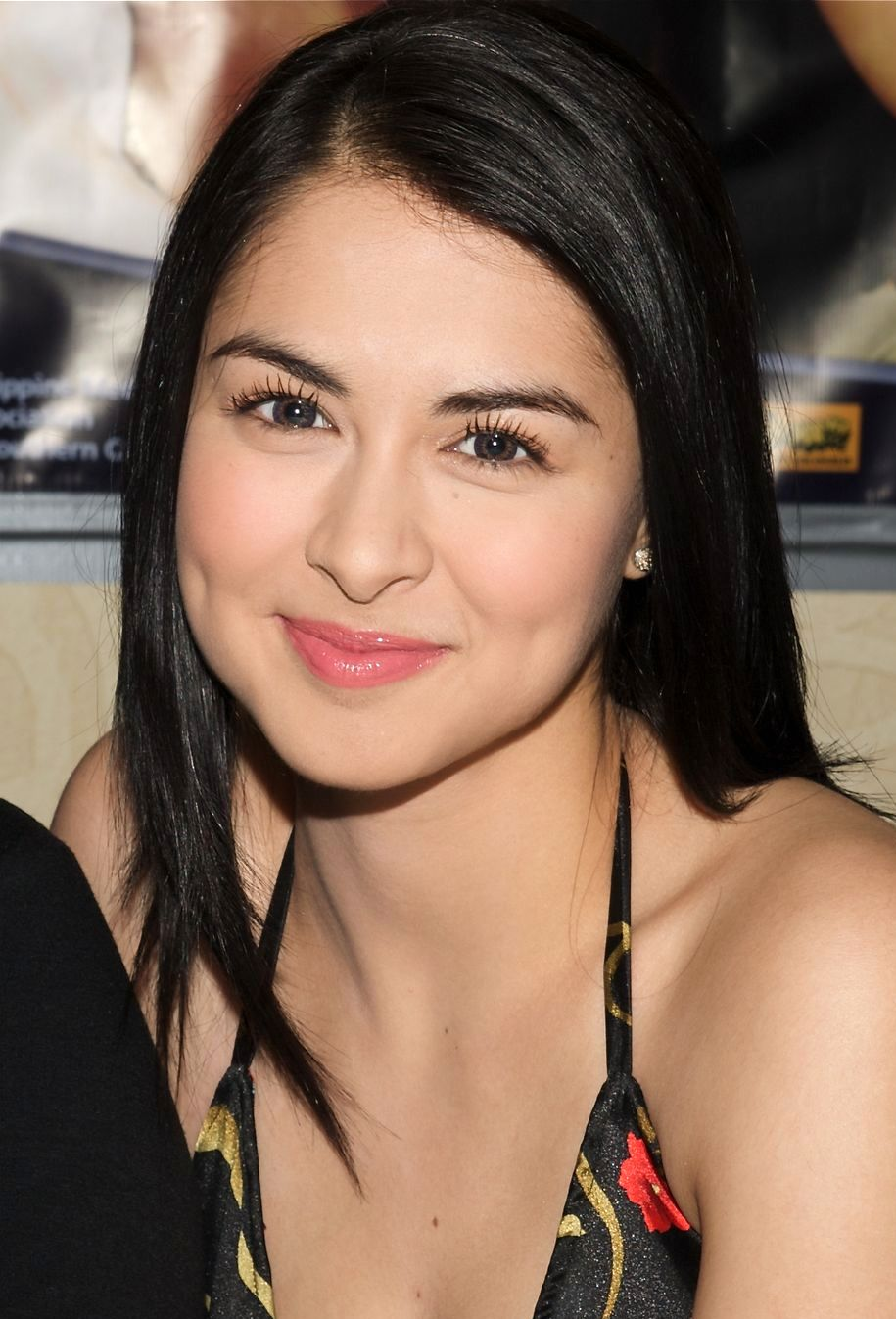
Marian Rivera, host of the drama anthology series Tadhana.

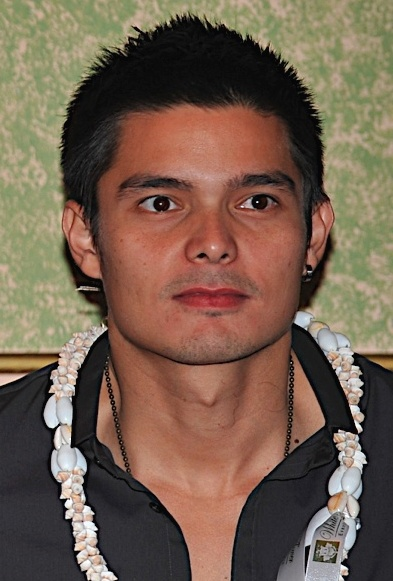
Dingdong Dantes, lead actor of the drama series The Master Cutter and host of the game show Family Feud.

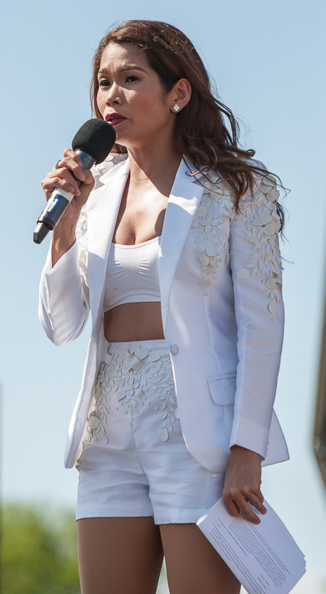
Pokwang, host of the variety show TiktoClock.

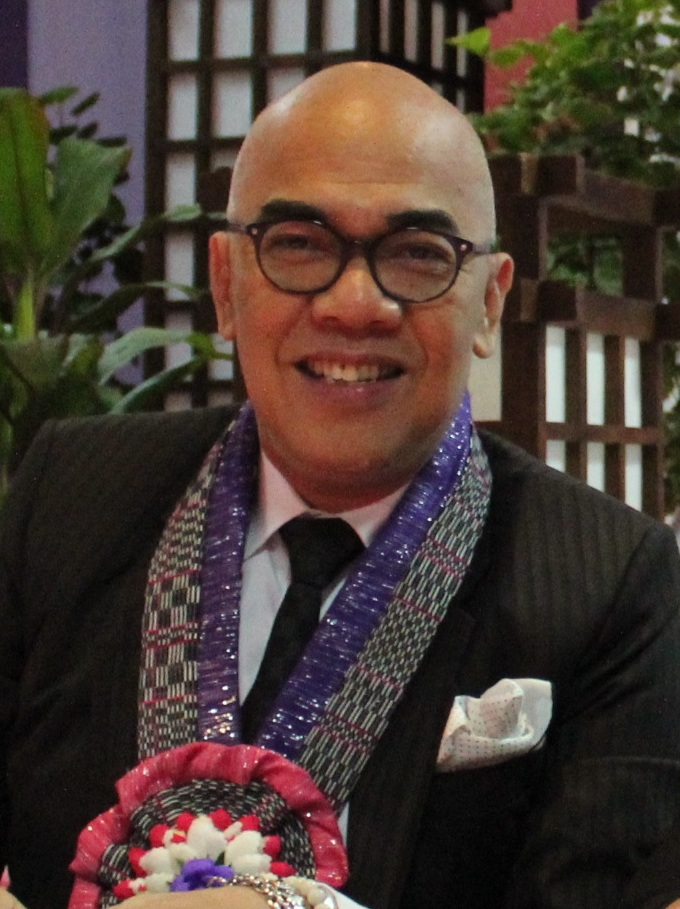
Boy Abunda, host of the talk show Fast Talk with Boy Abunda.

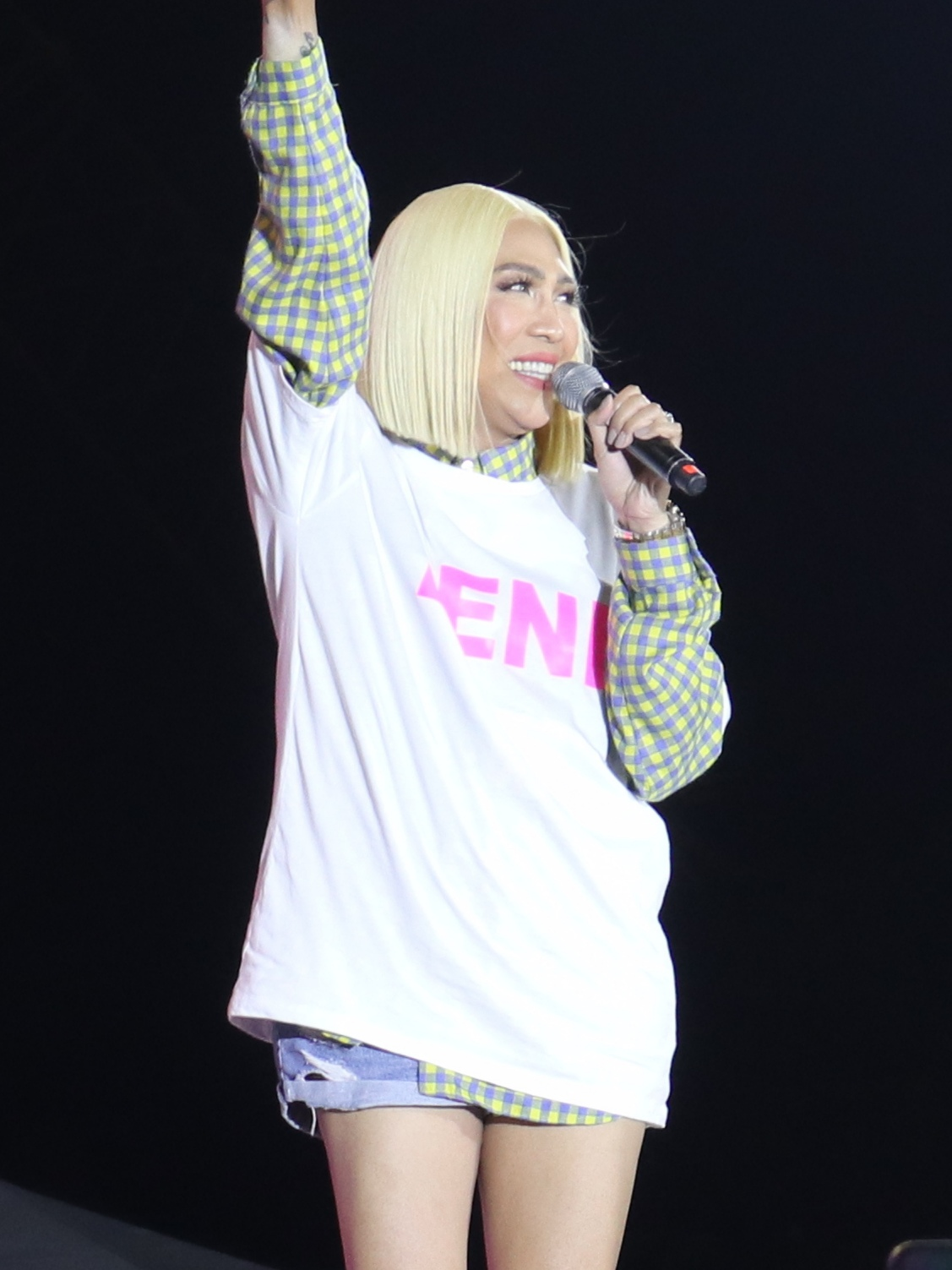
Vice Ganda, host of the talk show Gandang Gabi Vice.

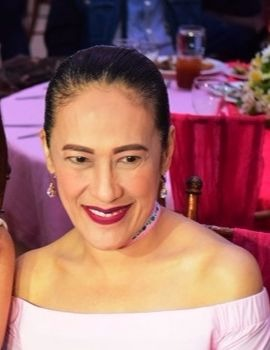
Ai-Ai delas Alas, judge of the reality show The Clash.

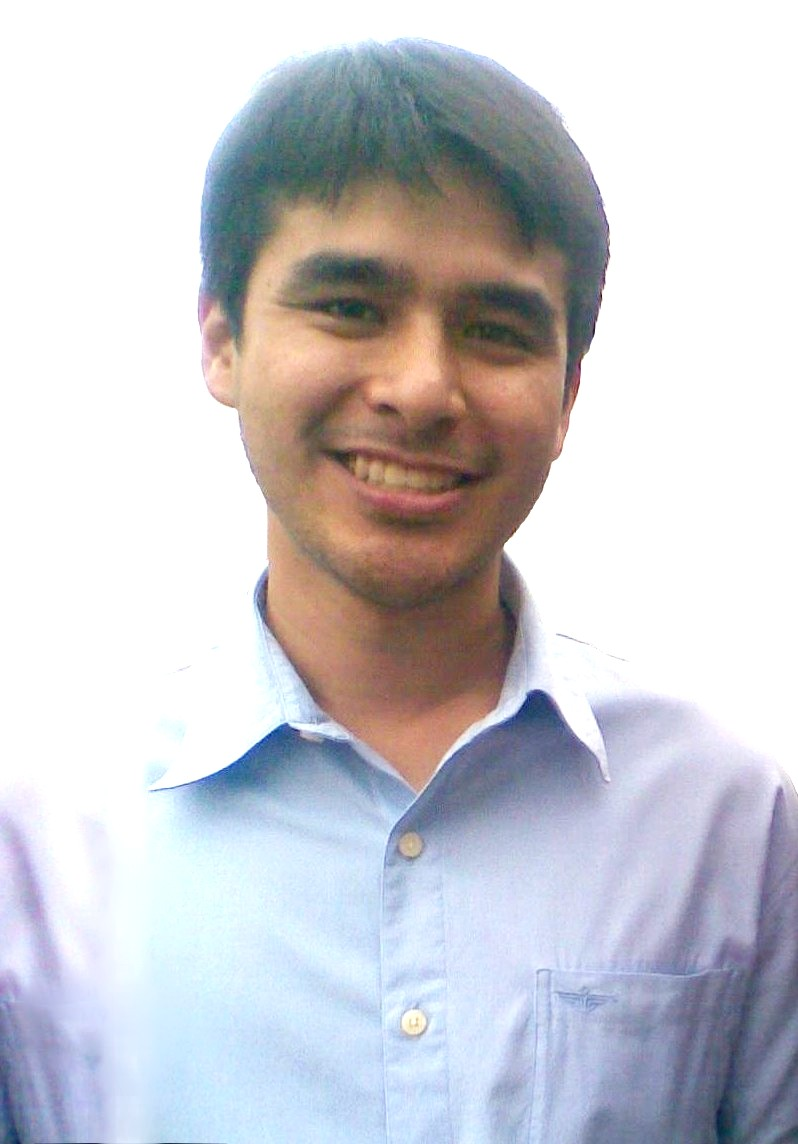
Atom Araullo, host of the documentary shows The Atom Araullo Specials and I-Witness.

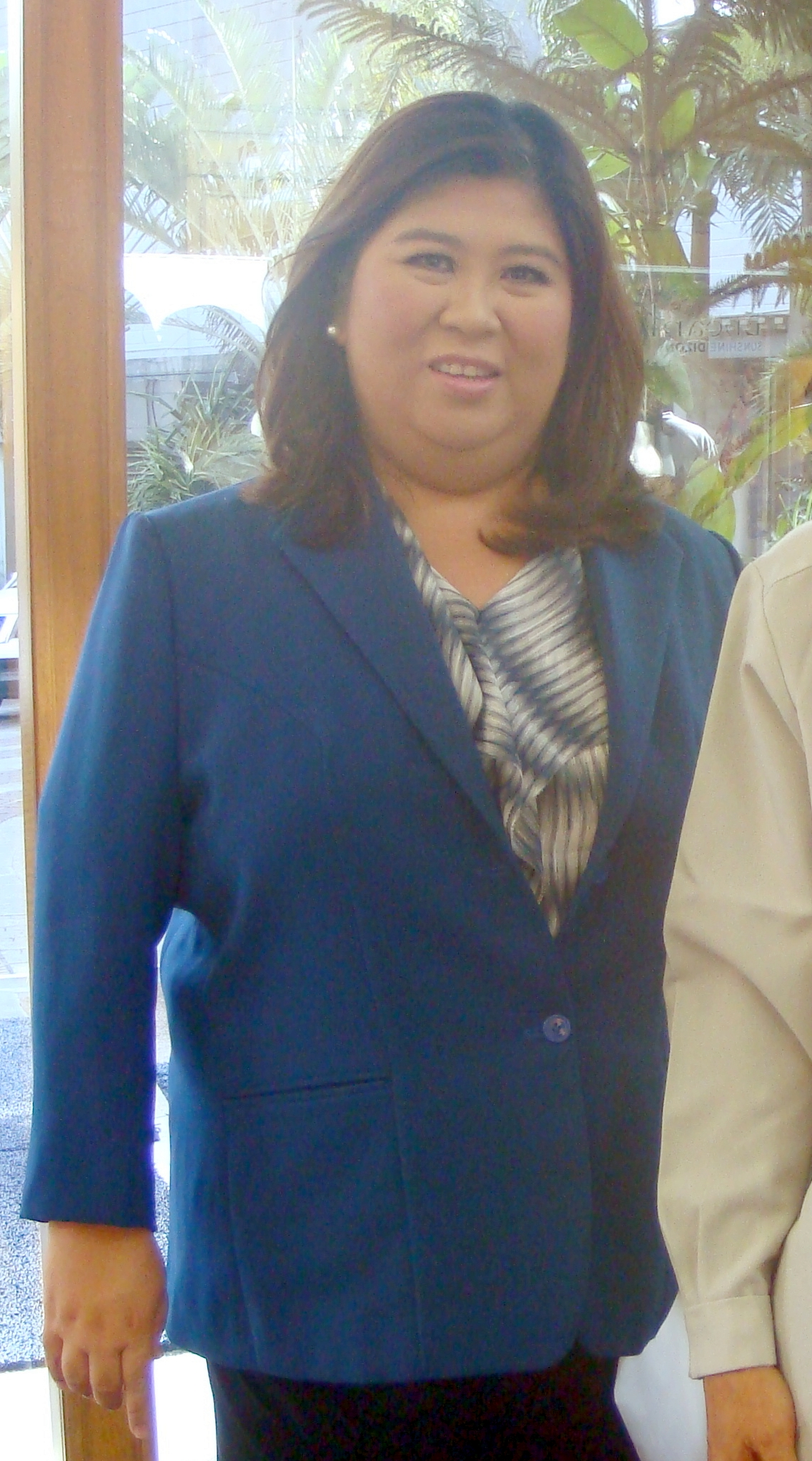
Jessica Soho, host of the magazine show Kapuso Mo, Jessica Soho.

GMA Network is currently broadcasting thirty-nine original programs.

=== Drama ===
==== Anthology ====
List of current drama anthologies, showing the premiere date
Title	Premiere
Wish Ko Lang!	June 29, 2002
Magpakailanman	December 2, 2002
Tadhana	May 20, 2017
Regal Studio Presents	September 11, 2021
Barangay Love Stories	September 12, 2026

==== Series ====
List of current drama series, showing the premiere date
Title	Premiere
Born to Shine	March 23, 2026
The Master Cutter	May 11, 2026
Taskforce Firewall	May 25, 2026
Delivery Boi	October 19, 2026

=== Variety ===
List of current variety shows, showing the premiere date
Title	Premiere
All-Out Sundays	January 5, 2020
TiktoClock	July 25, 2022

=== Comedy ===
List of current comedy shows or series, showing the premiere date
Title	Premiere
Bubble Gang	October 20, 1995
Pepito Manaloto: Tuloy ang Kuwento	June 11, 2022

=== Talk ===
List of current talk shows, showing the premiere date
Title	Premiere
The 700 Club Asia	1995
TBATS On the Go	January 27, 2019
Fast Talk with Boy Abunda	January 23, 2023
Gandang Gabi Vice	September 13, 2026

=== Game ===
List of current game shows, showing the premiere date
Title	Premiere
Family Feud	October 13, 2008

=== Reality ===
List of current reality shows, showing the premiere date
Title	Premiere
The Clash	July 7, 2018
The Voice Kids	September 15, 2024
Pinoy Big Brother	March 9, 2025
Stars on the Floor	June 28, 2025
The Clash Teens	June 7, 2026

=== News ===
List of current news shows, showing the premiere date
Title	Premiere
Saksi	October 2, 1995
Unang Hirit	December 6, 1999
24 Oras	March 15, 2004
24 Oras Weekend	February 21, 2010

=== Documentary ===
List of current documentary shows, showing the premiere date
Title	Premiere
I-Witness	January 18, 1999
Reporter's Notebook	June 1, 2004
Born to Be Wild	November 28, 2007
The Atom Araullo Specials	April 1, 2018

=== Magazine ===
List of current magazine shows, showing the premiere date
Title	Premiere
Kapuso Mo, Jessica Soho	November 7, 2004

=== Public service ===
List of current public service shows, showing the premiere date
Title	Premiere
Kapwa Ko Mahal Ko	December 1, 1975
Resibo: Walang Lusot ang May Atraso	May 7, 2023

=== Infotainment ===
List of current infotainment shows, showing the premiere date
Title	Premiere
iBilib	January 29, 2012
AgriPreneur	2019
Pera Paraan	October 16, 2021
Turbo Zone	2021
Dami Mong Alam, Kuya Kim!	November 30, 2024

== Former original programming ==
=== Drama ===
==== Anthology ====
List of former drama anthologies, showing the premiere date and finale date
Title	Premiere	Finale	Ref.
Lovingly Yours, Helen	September 7, 1980	1992	
Regal Shocker	1985	1989	
Mother Studio Presents	April 24, 1987	August 2, 1996	
Pira-pirasong Pangarap	August 18, 1997	February 21, 2003	
Maynila	December 13, 1999	August 1, 2020	
Kasangga	1999	2002	
Larawan: A Special Drama Engagement	February 14, 2001	December 26, 2001	
Nagmamahal, Manay Gina	February 24, 2003	August 29, 2003	
Love to Love	July 13, 2003	October 22, 2006	
Daisy Siete	September 1, 2003	July 2, 2010	
Ang Mahiwagang Baul	July 17, 2005	January 28, 2007	
Magic Kamison	February 4, 2007	June 17, 2007	
Mga Kuwento ni Lola Basyang	February 4, 2007	August 12, 2007	
Dear Friend	July 20, 2008	May 16, 2010	
Obra	August 14, 2008	November 27, 2008	
SRO Cinemaserye	March 26, 2009	April 8, 2010	
Claudine	April 10, 2010	August 7, 2010	
Love Bug	May 23, 2010	September 19, 2010	
Spooky Nights	March 26, 2011	April 28, 2012	
Spooky Valentine	February 4, 2012	February 25, 2012	
One Day Isang Araw	June 15, 2013	November 16, 2013	
Bingit	September 21, 2013	November 16, 2013	
Seasons of Love	October 6, 2014	October 30, 2014	
Elemento	October 10, 2014	October 31, 2014	
Karelasyon	April 11, 2015	May 13, 2017	
Alamat	July 12, 2015	June 19, 2016	
URL: Usapang Real Love	September 25, 2016	December 18, 2016	
Case Solved	February 18, 2017	March 25, 2017	
Daig Kayo ng Lola Ko	April 30, 2017		
Stories for the Soul	October 29, 2017	June 30, 2019	
Wagas	September 2, 2019	November 15, 2019	
I Can See You	September 28, 2020	February 4, 2022	
Stories from the Heart	September 13, 2021	January 7, 2022	
Luv Is	January 16, 2023	July 28, 2023	
Sparkle U	October 1, 2023	January 28, 2024	
Recipes of Love	March 31, 2024	May 26, 2024	
OK Ako	September 8, 2024	—N/a	

=== Variety ===
List of former variety shows, showing the premiere date and finale date
Title	Premiere	Finale	Ref.
Student Canteen	January 1975	June 7, 1986	
GMA Supershow (formerly as Germside and Germspesyal)	May 7, 1978	January 26, 1997	
The Penthouse Live!	August 29, 1982	February 15, 1987	
That's Entertainment (known as Saturday Entertainment in Saturdays)	January 6, 1986	May 3, 1996	
Lunch Date	June 9, 1986	March 19, 1993	
Vilma	August 8, 1986	September 29, 1995	
Gwapings Live!	October 4, 1992	October 10, 1993	
SST: Salo-Salo Together	March 20, 1993	June 30, 1995	
Eat Bulaga!	January 28, 1995	January 5, 2024	
SOP	February 2, 1997	February 28, 2010	
Walang Tulugan with the Master Showman	February 8, 1997	February 13, 2016	
SOP Gigsters	June 13, 2004	October 22, 2006	
Songbird	May 15, 2008	August 9, 2008	
Diz Iz It!	February 8, 2010	July 24, 2010	
Party Pilipinas	March 28, 2010	May 19, 2013	
Comedy Bar	April 24, 2010	October 29, 2011	
Sunday All Stars	June 16, 2013	August 2, 2015	
Marian	June 21, 2014	December 6, 2014	
Wowowin	May 10, 2015	February 11, 2022	
Sunday PinaSaya	August 9, 2015	December 29, 2019	
Full House Tonight	February 18, 2017	May 27, 2017	
Studio 7	October 14, 2018	December 7, 2019	
Toppstar TV	November 10, 2018	—N/a	
Tahanang Pinakamasaya	January 6, 2024	March 2, 2024	

=== Comedy ===
List of former comedy shows or series, showing the premiere date and finale date
Title	Premiere	Finale	Ref.
Ober Da Bakod	September 14, 1992	May 27, 1997	
Kate en Boogie	July 19, 1993	November 24, 1994	
Okay Ka, Fairy Ko!	November 26, 1995	April 3, 1997	
Si Tsong, Si Tsang	April 3, 1997	1999	
1 for 3	April 10, 1997	June 28, 2001	
Kool Ka Lang	October 19, 1998	October 17, 2003	
Mikee Forever	March 3, 1999	September 1, 1999	
Beh Bote Nga	March 9, 1999	April 23, 2003	
Kiss Muna	April 29, 2000	September 10, 2001	
Idol Ko si Kap	September 17, 2000	September 3, 2005	
Daddy Di Do Du	July 12, 2001	July 29, 2007	
Daboy en Da Girl	May 16, 2002	October 14, 2003	
Nuts Entertainment	April 30, 2003	December 27, 2008	
Lagot Ka... Isusumbong Kita!	October 20, 2003	April 9, 2007	
All Together Now	October 21, 2003	September 7, 2004	
Bitoy's Funniest Videos	July 3, 2004	October 10, 2009	
Bahay Mo Ba 'To?	September 14, 2004	July 10, 2007	
HP: To the Highest Level Na!	2007	July 14, 2007	
Who's Your Daddy Now?	April 16, 2007	July 13, 2007	
Camera Café	April 2007	2009	
Boys Nxt Door	June 24, 2007	January 13, 2008	
Ful Haus	August 5, 2007	August 16, 2009	
Cool Center	March 14, 2009	April 17, 2010	
Show Me Da Manny	August 23, 2009	July 10, 2011	
Laff En Roll: Level Up!	January 19, 2010	September 23, 2010	
Pepito Manaloto	March 28, 2010	March 25, 2012	
Kaya ng Powers	July 24, 2010	November 13, 2010	
JejeMom	August 14, 2010	November 13, 2010	
Ang Yaman ni Lola	August 23, 2010	January 21, 2011	
Andres de Saya	May 28, 2011	August 21, 2011	
Tweets for My Sweet	May 6, 2012	August 19, 2012	
Pepito Manaloto: Ang Tunay na Kuwento	September 16, 2012	October 10, 2020	
Vampire ang Daddy Ko	March 9, 2013	June 12, 2016	
Ismol Family	June 22, 2014	November 6, 2016	
Sabado Badoo	March 14, 2015	July 25, 2015	
Juan Tamad	August 23, 2015	March 13, 2016	
Dear Uge	February 14, 2016	February 13, 2022	
A1 Ko Sa'yo	June 2, 2016	November 24, 2016	
Hay, Bahay!	June 19, 2016	August 27, 2017	
Conan, My Beautician	June 26, 2016	September 18, 2016	
Tsuperhero	November 13, 2016	April 23, 2017	
Daddy's Gurl	October 13, 2018	May 6, 2023	
Alex & Amie	May 20, 2019	May 31, 2019	
Pepito Manaloto: Kuwento Kuwento	October 17, 2020	May 29, 2021	
Happy ToGetHer	December 26, 2021	August 6, 2023	
Jose & Maria's Bonggang Villa	May 14, 2022	March 23, 2024	
Open 24/7	May 27, 2023	May 25, 2024	

=== Talk ===
List of former talk shows, showing the premiere date and finale date
Title	Premiere	Finale	Ref.
Ms. Ellaneous	July 7, 1977	1981	
Movie Magazine	February 28, 1987	September 23, 1995	
Eye to Eye	January 11, 1988	August 9, 1996	
Martin After Dark	July 30, 1988	1993	
Show & Tell	July 16, 1994	October 1, 1995	
Katok Mga Misis	July 31, 1995	June 5, 1998	
Startalk	October 8, 1995	September 12, 2015	
The Kris Aquino Show	August 12, 1996	October 25, 1996	
Ms. D!	November 11, 1996	February 26, 1999	
S-Files	June 7, 1998	April 22, 2007	
Sis	August 27, 2001	January 1, 2010	
Celebrity Turns with Junee and Lani/Pops	November 8, 2003	June 26, 2004	
Partners with Mel Tiangco	February 15, 2004	July 25, 2004	
Mel & Joey	August 1, 2004	July 17, 2011	
Showbiz Central	April 29, 2007	July 29, 2012	
Cool Center	March 14, 2009	April 17, 2010	
Love ni Mister, Love ni Misis	August 9, 2010	March 4, 2011	
Star Box	April 4, 2011	May 13, 2011	
Pare & Pare	May 20, 2012	August 12, 2012	
H.O.T. TV: Hindi Ordinaryong Tsismis	August 5, 2012	April 28, 2013	
Sarap Diva	October 6, 2012	October 13, 2018	
Para sa 'Yo ang Laban Na Ito	February 3, 2013	April 20, 2013	
The Ryzza Mae Show	April 8, 2013	September 18, 2015	
The Medyo Late Night Show with Jojo A.	January 6, 2014	December 5, 2014	
Basta Every Day Happy	May 12, 2014	January 5, 2015	
Love Hotline	May 30, 2014	April 29, 2016	
CelebriTV	September 19, 2015	May 21, 2016	
Dream Home	February 28, 2016	April 29, 2016	
Yan ang Morning!	May 2, 2016	August 12, 2016	
The Lolas' Beautiful Show	September 25, 2017	February 2, 2018	
Sarap, 'Di Ba?	October 20, 2018	September 28, 2024	
Mars Pa More	July 8, 2019	July 1, 2022	
Ilaban Natin Yan!	February 22, 2020	April 4, 2020	
Cayetano in Action with Boy Abunda	February 5, 2023	2026	
My Mother, My Story	May 12, 2024	October 27, 2024	

=== Game ===
List of former game shows, showing the premiere date and finale date
Title	Premiere	Finale	Ref.
GoBingo	December 9, 1996	October 10, 2008	
Digital LG Quiz	October 23, 1999	2004	
All-Star K!	January 13, 2002	October 18, 2009	
Tok! Tok! Tok! Isang Milyon Pasok	May 27, 2007	November 2, 2008	
Whammy! Push Your Luck	October 8, 2007	February 29, 2008	
Kakasa Ka Ba sa Grade 5?	October 27, 2007	May 9, 2009	
Da Big Show	April 21, 2008	July 2008	
Hole in the Wall	April 20, 2009	November 27, 2010	
Power of 10	May 10, 2009	December 27, 2009	
BandaOke! Rock 'N Roll to Millions	October 25, 2009	March 21, 2010	
Wachamakulit	April 16, 2010	September 24, 2010	
Take Me Out	April 26, 2010	July 2, 2010	
Asar Talo Lahat Panalo!	September 18, 2010	November 20, 2010	
Manny Many Prizes	July 16, 2011	December 2, 2012	
Celebrity Bluff	November 17, 2012	June 30, 2018	
Picture! Picture!	November 23, 2013	June 15, 2014	
Don't Lose the Money	September 22, 2014	December 22, 2014	
Laff Camera Action	May 28, 2016	August 27, 2016	
People vs. the Stars	January 15, 2017	April 16, 2017	
All-Star Videoke	September 3, 2017	March 25, 2018	
Bossing & Ai	September 24, 2017	February 4, 2018	
The Wall Philippines	August 28, 2022	December 4, 2022	
The People Have Spoken	June 6, 2026	October 17, 2026	

=== Reality ===
List of former reality shows, showing the premiere date and finale date
Title	Premiere	Finale	Ref.
Extra Challenge	September 1, 2003	January 20, 2013	
Wag Kukurap	August 28, 2004	April 29, 2006	
Ang Pagbabago	July 10, 2006	September 1, 2006	
Kung Ako Ikaw	July 16, 2007	August 14, 2008	
Survivor Philippines	September 15, 2008	February 19, 2012	
Ang Yaman ni Lola	August 23, 2010	January 21, 2011	
Puso ng Pasko: Artista Challenge	December 6, 2010	December 31, 2010	
Kitchen Superstar	April 4, 2011	July 1, 2011	
Amazing Cooking Kids	April 16, 2011	July 16, 2011	
Follow Your Heart	April 23, 2017	July 16, 2017	
Road Trip	July 23, 2017	January 14, 2018	
Running Man Philippines	September 3, 2022	September 8, 2024	
Heart World	October 26, 2024	June 20, 2026	

==== Talent-based ====
List of former reality talent-based shows, showing the premiere date and finale date
Title	Premiere	Finale	Ref
Tanghalan ng Kampeon	1988	1993	
Search for a Star	June 21, 2003	March 13, 2004	
StarStruck	October 27, 2003	September 15, 2019	
StarStruck Kids	March 20, 2004	June 26, 2004	
Pinoy Pop Superstar	July 3, 2004	June 2, 2007	
Celebrity Duets: Philippine Edition	August 11, 2007	November 14, 2009	
Pinoy Idol	April 5, 2008	August 17, 2008	
Are You the Next Big Star?	May 16, 2009	August 23, 2009	
Bitoy's Showwwtime	October 17, 2009	March 13, 2010	
Danz Showdown	July 5, 2010	October 1, 2010	
I-Shine Talent Camp	June 12, 2011	July 31, 2011	
Protégé	September 4, 2011	October 21, 2012	
Bet ng Bayan	October 5, 2014	December 28, 2014	
To the Top	July 25, 2015	September 27, 2015	
Lip Sync Battle Philippines	February 27, 2016	July 1, 2018	
#Like	September 3, 2016	February 11, 2017	
Superstar Duets	September 3, 2016	December 17, 2016	
Centerstage	February 16, 2020	June 6, 2021	
Catch Me Out Philippines	February 6, 2021	September 4, 2021	
Battle of the Judges	July 15, 2023	September 30, 2023	
The Voice Generations	August 27, 2023	December 10, 2023	

=== News ===
List of former news shows, showing the premiere date and finale date
Title	Premiere	Finale
The News with Uncle Bob	October 30, 1961	September 22, 1972
The World Today	September 25, 1972	June 28, 1974
GMA Evening Report	July 1, 1974	October 29, 1976
GMA News Roundup	July 1, 1974	October 31, 1976
GMA News Digest	November 1, 1976	January 4, 1987
News at Seven	November 1, 1976	May 16, 1986
The 11:30 Report	November 1, 1982	May 16, 1986
GMA Headline News	May 19, 1986	January 3, 1992
GMA Balita	May 19, 1986	April 8, 1998
GMA Saturday/Sunday Report	May 24, 1986	August 20, 1989
GMA News Live	January 5, 1987	July 14, 2002
GMA Morning News Live	1991	1991
Kape at Balita	February 11, 1991	December 3, 1993
GMA Network News	January 6, 1992	July 14, 2002
Mornings @ GMA	April 13, 1998	December 3, 1999
Frontpage: Ulat ni Mel Tiangco	August 16, 1999	March 12, 2004
Flash Report	July 15, 2002	March 27, 2016
Flash Report Special Edition	July 20, 2002	June 17, 2007
GMA Breaking News	2004	2018
GMA Weekend Report	June 23, 2007	February 20, 2010
GMA News Update	March 28, 2016	April 8, 2018
GMA News Update Breaking News	March 28, 2016	April 8, 2018
Saksi Breaking News	April 9, 2018	March 27, 2020
Dobol B sa GMA	March 23, 2020	April 8, 2020
GMA Regional TV Weekend News	March 21, 2020	April 25, 2020
24 Oras News Alert	April 18, 2020	March 31, 2023

=== Documentary ===
List of former documentary shows, showing the premiere date and finale date
Title	Premiere	Finale
Interaction	1976	1987
Face the Nation	1980	1980
Real People	1981	1985
Someone's on Your Side	1987	1989
Velez This Week	1987	1990
Veritas Monitors	1988	1988
The Probe Team	May 20, 1988	November 25, 2003
Negosiete: Mag-aral sa GMA	1990	1998
Profiles of Power	1990	1996
Firing Line	1992	1998
Brigada Siete	December 3, 1993	September 29, 2001
Liberty Live with Joe Taruc	1994	1995
Emergency	October 4, 1995	March 6, 2009
Liberty on TV	1995	1996
Cheche Lazaro Presents	February 14, 1999	June 22, 2003
The Probe Team Documentaries	1999	2003
Imbestigador	August 2, 2000	September 9, 2023
Jessica Soho Reports	October 10, 2001	March 30, 2005
Lakas Magsasaka	2003	2005
Sine Totoo: The Best of Serbisyong Totoo	February 17, 2007	February 28, 2009
Case Unclosed	October 2, 2008	February 25, 2010
OFW Diaries	March 13, 2009	January 14, 2011
Gusto Kong Maging Pangulo!	2009	2009
World View Presents	2009	2009
Rescue	May 13, 2010	February 14, 2013
Anatomy of a Disaster	August 22, 2010	November 6, 2011
Misteryo	December 18, 2010	July 9, 2011
Tunay na Buhay	January 21, 2011	October 20, 2021
Sanib Puwersa	October 23, 2011	November 13, 2011
Flashbook	2012	2013
Out of Control	November 23, 2013	January 18, 2014
Front Row	February 10, 2014	March 8, 2021
The Global Filipino	2017	2017
Lockdown: Food Diaries	2020	2020
On Record	February 16, 2021	October 19, 2021
Stories of Hope	March 15, 2021	October 18, 2021
Pinoy Crime Stories	September 16, 2023	July 27, 2024

==== Travelogue ====
List of former travelogue shows, showing the premiere date and finale date
Title	Premiere	Finale
Visions 1990	1978	1978
Embassy Features	1983	1990
Travel Time	1989	1998
Extra Trip	2002	2003
Pinoy Abroad	April 6, 2005	June 28, 2006
Pinoy Meets World	June 25, 2006	January 25, 2009
Pinoy Adventures	May 13, 2012	September 29, 2012
Born Impact: Born to Be Wild Weekend Edition	January 27, 2013	February 2, 2014
Biyahe ni Drew	August 3, 2024	September 14, 2024
Planet XP	May 2, 2026	2026

=== Magazine ===
List of former magazine shows, showing the premiere date and finale date
Title	Premiere	Finale
Weekend with Velez	1986	1987
Magnegosyo	1998	1999
Extra Extra	February 15, 1999	August 29, 2003
Extra Ordinaryo	2002	2003
Out!	September 4, 2004	December 4, 2004
100% Pinoy!	July 5, 2006	September 25, 2008
Dapat Alam Mo!	February 14, 2022	March 18, 2022
The Best Ka!	February 20, 2022	June 5, 2022

=== Public affairs ===
List of former public affairs shows, showing the premiere date and finale date
Title	Premiere	Finale
Interaction	1976	1987
Viewpoint	August 21, 1984	November 1994
Ecotrends	1985	1986
Straight from the Shoulder	January 14, 1987	August 31, 1994
Issues and Answers	1989	1990
Business Today	October 1, 1990	March 29, 1996
Tapatan with Jay Sonza	May 17, 1995	November 11, 1998
Public Life with Randy David	November 28, 1996	October 1998
Good Morning Asia	1997	1998
Compañero y Compañera	October 1998	July 26, 2000
Debate with Mare at Pare	November 18, 1998	November 2, 2006
Bio Data	December 2003	2004
Wanted: Congressman	2004	2004
Wanted: Governor	2004	2004
Wanted: Mayor	2004	2004
Wanted: President	2004	2016
Wanted: Senator	2004	2004
At Your Service	May 1, 2004	October 2005
Paninindigan	2004	2004
Adyenda	2005	2017
Diyos at Bayan	2006	June 3, 2019
Palaban	November 8, 2006	November 14, 2007
Philippine Agenda	March 25, 2007	May 13, 2007
Isang Tanong: The GMA News & Public Affairs Senatorial Forum	2007	2007
Isang Tanong: The GMA News & Public Affairs Presidential Forum	2009	2009
Isang Tanong: The GMA News & Public Affairs Vice Presidential Forum	2010	2010
Kandidato	March 3, 2010	May 2, 2013
Votebook	2010	2010
Biyaheng Totoo	2010	2013

=== Public service ===
List of former public service shows, showing the premiere date and finale date
Title	Premiere	Finale
Alisto	March 23, 2013	February 9, 2021
Si Manoy Ang Ninong Ko	March 3, 2024	July 28, 2024
Dear SV	November 18, 2023	March 1, 2025

=== Infotainment ===
List of former infotainment shows, showing the premiere date and finale date
Title	Premiere	Finale	Ref.
Chikiting Patrol	1990	July 14, 2002	
5 and Up	1994	July 14, 2002	
Batibot	1995	1999	
Tipong Pinoy	1998	1998	
Kay Susan Tayo!	November 30, 2003	October 25, 2009	
Lovely Day	April 3, 2004	May 23, 2009	
Art Angel	April 17, 2004	May 14, 2011	
Kap's Amazing Stories	August 19, 2007	July 6, 2014	
Pinoy Records	December 8, 2007	July 17, 2010	
Jollitown	April 13, 2008	October 12, 2013	
Ka-Blog!	August 9, 2008	October 2, 2010	
Ripley's Believe It or Not!	August 18, 2008	September 22, 2010	
Batang Bibbo!	November 8, 2008	November 21, 2009	
Happy Land	June 6, 2009	March 27, 2010	
Tropang Potchi	December 19, 2009	February 14, 2015	
Zooperstars	February 28, 2010	June 27, 2010	
Aha!	April 4, 2010	2025	
Sunnyville	April 10, 2010	November 13, 2010	
Pinoy M.D.	June 12, 2010	2025	
Hanep Buhay	November 13, 2010	November 26, 2011	
My Chubby World	May 14, 2011	August 11, 2012	
Sabadabadog!	May 21, 2011	November 19, 2011	
Nay-1-1	November 12, 2012	December 28, 2012	
Watta Job	November 17, 2012	February 16, 2013	
Amazing Earth	June 17, 2018		
Pinas Sarap	December 26, 2020	January 30, 2021	
Where in Manila	March 8, 2025	2025	

==== Cooking ====
List of former cooking shows, showing the premiere date and finale date
Title	Premiere	Finale	Ref.
Del Monte Kitchenomics	1995	2015	
Chef Boy Logro: Kusina Master	January 2, 2012	May 9, 2014	
Cooking with the Stars	May 28, 2012	August 3, 2012	
Home Foodie	August 10, 2016	September 6, 2019	

=== Religious ===
List of former religious shows, showing the premiere date and finale date
Title	Premiere	Finale
The Essential Christ
Robert Schuller
Voice in the Wilderness
The World Tomorrow	1974	1994
John Osteen	1975	1990
Guidelines with Dr. Harold J. Sala	1980	October 26, 2002
Heartbeat	1980	1987
Christ is the Answer	1983	1987
Philippines for Jesus Presents	1983	1998
The Rev. Ernest Angley Hour	1983	1995
Jesus Miracle Crusade Ministry	1986	October 26, 2002
The Pulpit of Christ	1986	2001
Gideon 300	1988	1993
Tinig sa Itaas	1988	1998
Midnight Prayer Helps	1988	1999
Word of Hope	1989	October 26, 2002
Jesus the Healer	1989	June 2, 2019
Cathedral of Praise with David Sumrall	1995	October 20, 2002
INC on GMA: Gabay sa Mabuting Asal	1999	2002
One Cubed	1999	October 25, 2002
Ecclesia in Asia: Ang Misa	2000	2010
Pasugo: Ang Tinig ng Iglesia ni Cristo	2002	2005
PJM Forum	2006	2017
Family TV Mass	August 3, 2014	December 28, 2014
Lifegiver	2017	June 1, 2019
Light Up	December 2, 2017	June 1, 2019
Sambuhay TV Mass	March 22, 2020	May 10, 2020

=== Other ===
List of former other shows, showing the premiere date and finale date
Title	Premiere	Finale
Kwentong Kutsero	1961	1967
Movies to Watch	1985	1993
Music Video Features	1992	2000
TV Shopper	1999	2000
Campus Video	1999	2001
One Cubed	1999	October 25, 2002
Metro TV Shopping	1999	2002
Txtube	2001	2006
SMC's Dayriser	2004	2006
Shop TV	November 30, 2015	May 20, 2016
EZ Shop	February 14, 2017	December 21, 2017

== Current regional programming ==
Titles are listed in alphabetical order followed by the year of debut in parentheses.

=== News ===
- Balitang Bisdak (1999)
- One Mindanao (2017)
- One North Central Luzon (2022)
- Ratsada Balita (2026)

=== Other ===
- GMA Regional TV Specials
- Sunday Catholic TV Mass (2020)

== Former regional programming ==
Titles are listed in alphabetical order followed by the year of debut in parentheses.

=== Variety ===
- Bongga! (1999–2007)
- Eat Na Ta! (2007–08)
- Kuyaw! (2005–08)
- Una Ka BAI (2007–15)

=== News ===
- 24 Oras Bikol (2014–15)
- 24 Oras Ilokano (2014–15)
- 24 Oras Northern Mindanao (2014–15)
- Arangkada (2007–15)
- At Home with GMA Regional TV (2020–24)
- Balitang Bicolandia (2021–24)
- Balitang Southern Tagalog (2022–24)
- Buena Mano Balita (2009–15)
- GMA Regional TV Early Edition (2020–24)
- GMA Regional TV Live! (2020–24)
- Mornings with GMA Regional TV (2020–24)
- Primera Balita (2009–15)
- Ratsada 24 Oras (2015)

=== Documentary ===
- Isyu ug Istorya (2014–15)

=== Magazine ===
- Isyu Ngayon (2010–15)

== See also ==
- List of Philippine television shows
