= Jay Sonza =

Filipino blogger and former journalist (born 1955)

Secretary General of the Aksyon Demokratiko
- In office 2006–2009
- Succeeded by: Lorna Kapunan

Personal details
- Born: Jose Yumang Sonza; September 20, 1955 (age 71) Macabebe, Pampanga, Philippines
- Party: Kilusang Bagong Lipunan (2009–2010)
- Other political affiliations: BATAS (2007–2009); Aksyon Demokratiko (2004–2007)
- Spouse: Ma. Thelma Hernandez
- Children: 5
- Education: University of Mindanao, (BA); University of the Philippines, (BS)
- Occupation: Journalist, newscaster

Jose Yumang Sonza (born September 20, 1955), more commonly known as Jay Sonza, is a Filipino blogger and a former newscaster and talk show host. He was the former station manager of the terrestrial television station UNTV from 2004 to 2010. He attempted to run for vice president in 2010, but lost to Jejomar Binay. As of April 30, 2026, Jay Sonza has been arrested by the NBI in Quezon City due to a warrant of arrest in a case involving the dissemination of misinformation using the internet or media.

== Early life and education ==
Sonza was born on September 20, 1955, in Macabebe, Pampanga, to Dalmacio Isip Sonza and Segundina Viray Yumang. During his childhood, his family migrated to Bansalan, Davao del Sur, near Mount Apo. He was able to work to finance his studies. During that time, he worked as a bartender in resto-bars in Davao City.

He finished both elementary and high school in Bansalan. He later took up BA Political Science at the University of Mindanao, and BS Economics at the University of the Philippines. Pursuing studies in the United States, he took special studies on satellite broadcasting at the University of Nebraska, as well as a degree at the East-West University in Hawaii; and attended a program of the Civil Service Academy.

== Media career ==
At his teenage years, Sonza worked at DXGE, a radio station in Davao City, where his media career later began as disc jockey and news anchor. His expertise also gave way to be part of DXUL, DXDC, DXRA, DXRP and an ad promo agency. He worked as well as a writer for radio.

He became part of Radio Mindanao Network, working for DZXL from 1980 to 1986 as announcer, news director and program director; at the same time, he acted as officer in charge of the network's DXDC and DXXL in Davao City. He returned in 2001 as program host.

He worked at ABS-CBN Broadcasting Corporation (now ABS-CBN Corporation) from 1987 to 1995. He became a part-time news writer. Following his transfer, he was among the people behind the network's newscast TV Patrol. He then worked at GMA Network until 2004, wherein he became a supervising producer and consultant. He was the director of GMA Bisig Bayan Foundation.

Sonza, together with Mel Tiangco who also worked for DZXL, were known being the tandem who popularized radio and television programs. In ABS-CBN, Mel and Jay premiered on DZMM in 1987; a few years later, it aired on Channel 2 as a Sunday talk show and public affairs program with the same title, which was Sonza's first television appearance. Upon their transfer to GMA Network, the program aired since 1996 on Channel 7, being renamed Partners Mel and Jay, and later on DZBB.

Since 2005, he became station manager of UNTV-37. He took his hosting duties in these networks. Aside from these, he also became part of RPN-9 in 2000 where his program, Tapatan, was moved from GMA-7; he once worked as news anchor at ABC-5 in 2001 but later resigned due to pressure at his own consultancy firm.

He also became part of radio station DZRH in 2000.

Also worked for publications, Sonza became a People's Daily Forum editor and a correspondent of the Philippine News Agency and two Mindanao-based periodicals. He also worked for The Manila Times, Hot News, Abante, and Abante Tonite.

It was during his career when he won several awards, among them the PMPC Star Awards for Television, a Catholic Mass Media Award for Public Service, and the Rotary Club of Manila's Outstanding Journalist Award. He later became a social media personality, and by late 2023, was working for Sonshine Media Network International.

Sonza was among the witnesses presented by the prosecution during the 2000 impeachment trial of then president Joseph Estrada.

== Political career ==
Sonza worked for Commission on Population–Davao Region as an information officer. He also worked at the provincial government of Davao del Sur, being an administrator for six years; as well as at the Ministry of Social Services Development for eleven years as a youth development officer for the Bureau of Youth Welfare.

Sonza reportedly had been interested in politics, as both Lapian ng Masang Pilipino and Lakas parties invited him to be in their senatorial lineup in the 2001 elections. He later unsuccessfully ran thrice for various political positions; twice for the Congress: in 2004, for senator under Alyansa ng Pag-asa coalition and Aksyon Demokratiko; and in 2007, for sectoral representative, being a BATAS party-list nominee.

In 2010, being among the eight vice presidential candidates, he ran under the Kilusang Bagong Lipunan with his running mate disqualified by the Commission on Elections during the campaign. He only placed seventh.

During the administration of Rodrigo Duterte, Sonza, known for being a self-confessed supporter, was widely criticized for spreading fake news and rumors against the government's critics, one of them then vice president Leni Robredo. His various remarks and social media posts even became the subject of fact-checking.

== Business career ==
At a time, Sonza, also a farmer, had three business enterprises. Being into agribusiness, his family had a fruit and animal farm in Bansalan in the 1990s. He was also managing his own restaurant, Retro Bar and Restaurant, in Quezon City. He put up his own production company named after his Tapatan television program.

== Legal issues ==
=== Complaint against ABS-CBN ===
On April 30, 1996, Sonza filed a complaint against ABS-CBN Broadcasting Corporation before the Department of Labor and Employment, due to allegations of unpaid salaries and fees. Sonza, being the president and general manager of Mel and Jay Management and Development Corporation, had resigned from the network about a month earlier. On July 8, 1997, the Labor Arbiter dismissed the complaint for lack of jurisdiction, which was later affirmed by the National Labor Relations Commission, the Court of Appeals (CA), and eventually, the Supreme Court, which cited that Sonza, as broadcast and entertainment talent, is an independent contractor (the same argument referred to Mel Tiangco by the court which also dismissed her own case against the network).

=== Complaint by ABS-CBN vs. Sonza et al ===
A civil case was filed by ABS-CBN Broadcasting Corporation against Sonza and Tiangco (who was also charged with violating the network's policy against endorsing products) for their breach of talent agreement with the network. Another was filed in 1996 against GMA-7 for reportedly interfering with the agreement. The contract, stating that the two were exclusive talent of ABS-CBN until 1997, was breached however as they agreed with GMA-7 to produce Partners Mel and Jay a year prior.

The cases were dismissed by the Quezon City Regional Trial Court (RTC) in 1998; the ruling was affirmed by the CA on August 6, 2003.

=== Complaint filed by Julia Barretto ===
On September 25, 2020, actress Julia Barretto filed a complaint against Sonza before the National Bureau of Investigation's (NBI) Cybercrime Division in connection with his social media post claiming that she was pregnant.

=== 2023 arrest ===
Sonza was arrested and detained by the Bureau of Immigration at Ninoy Aquino International Airport Terminal 3 on July 18, 2023, while en route to his departure for Hong Kong. This is in connection with a warrant of arrest for eleven counts of estafa issued by Quezon City RTC Branch 100, as well as allegations of syndicated and large scale illegal recruitment (in relation to Republic Act No. 8042, the Migrant Workers Overseas Filipinos Act). He was transferred to the NBI in Manila and, on August 3, to the Bureau of Jail Management and Penology. He was detained in a COVID-19 quarantine facility in Quezon City Jail in Payatas.

His arrest was confirmed on August 15 by both BI, NBI, and BJMP. It was later confirmed that Quezon City RTC Branches 215 and 100 dismissed the illegal recruitment cases; the latter "provisionally" dismissed the case citing the complainants' failure to appear before the court.

On August 18, Sonza pleaded not guilty before the RTC Branch 77 for a separate, 2007 libel case; charges of estafa before the Metropolitan Trial Court Branch 135 are also pending. He was released from detention on August 22 after posting bail of ₱270,000 for both cases.

=== 2026 ===
In 2026, complaints were filed against Sonza before the Department of Justice in separate occasions.

In February, the NBI filed a cyberlibel complaint against him and social media personality Eric Celiz for allegedly spreading medical information about President Bongbong Marcos, which was later found to be false. Sonza was reported posting the claims on Facebook.

In March, former senator Antonio Trillanes IV filed criminal complaints against him, among others, regarding the latter's allegations that he received cash from former congressman Zaldy Co to fund the International Criminal Court personnel.

== Personal life ==
Sonza was formerly married to a woman with whom he has five children. His marriage was annulled in 1999.

Sonza admitted in a 2010 pre-election interview being a heavy smoker while he was active in media career.

Sonza is a fluent speaker of Kapampangan, Tagalog, Cebuano, Hiligaynon and English.

As of April 30, 2026, Jay Sonza has been arrested by the NBI in Quezon City due to a warrant of arrest in a case involving the dissemination of misinformation using the internet or media.

== Electoral history ==
Electoral history of Jay Sonza
Year	Office	Party	Votes received				Result
Year	Office	Party	Total	%	P.	Swing	Result
2004	Senator of the Philippines	Aksyon	2,839,442	8.00%	27th	—N/a	Lost
2007	Representative (Party-list)	BATAS	385,956	2.41%	11th	—N/a	Nullified
2010	Vice President of the Philippines	KBL	64,230	0.18%	7th	—N/a	Lost

== Programs ==
- Dear Deejay Jay (1981–1985) (DZMB)
- Mel & Jay (1989–1996) (ABS-CBN)
- TV Patrol (1987–1996) (ABS-CBN) - substitute anchor for Noli De Castro or Frankie Evangelista
- Mel & Jay sa DZMM (1987–1995) (DZMM)
- Pulis, Pulis Kung Umaksiyon, Mabilis (1993–1995) (DZMM)
- Tapatan with Jay Sonza (1995–1998; 2000–2001; 2004–2005) (GMA Network/RPN/UNTV)
  - Tapatang Jay at Deo (2000–?) (DZRH)
- Tapatan with Jay Sonza Radio Edition (1995–2010) (DZBB/DZRH/DZXL/DZIQ)
- Partners Mel and Jay (1996–2004) (GMA Network)
- Saksi (1998–1999) (GMA Network)
- Newscenter Balita (2000–2004) (DZRH)
- Damdaming Bayan (2000–?) (DZRH)
- Balitang Balita (2000–2001) (ABC)
- Pilipinas, Gising Ka Na Ba? (2005–2007) (UNTV)
- Hataw Balita (Primetime) (2007) (UNTV)
- Ito Ang Balita (2007–2010) (UNTV)
- Get it Straight (2008–2010) (UNTV)
- Good Morning Kuya (UNTV)
- Jay On Board Tapatan (2021–2023) (via Facebook Live/Twitter/YouTube streaming)
- MakiAlam (2024) (Sonshine Radio Manila via streaming)

== Awards and nominations ==
Year	Award-giving body	Category	Nominated work	Results	Ref.
2000	14th PMPC Star Awards for Television	Best Celebrity Talk Show Hosts (Note: Shared with fellow host Mel Tiangco.) (Note: Tied with Kris Aquino.)	Partners Mel and Jay (GMA-7)	Won	
2001	15th PMPC Star Awards for Television	Best Celebrity Talk Show Host	Partners Mel and Jay (GMA-7)	Won	

== See also ==
- Mel Tiangco
- Diehard Duterte Supporters

Party political offices
Vacant Title last held by Vicente Magsaysay	Kilusang Bagong Lipunan nominee for Vice President of the Philippines; 2010	Most recent
