= Sine Totoo: The Best of Serbisyong Totoo =

Philippine television documentary show

- Title card
- Genre: Documentary
- Presented by: Howie Severino
- Country of origin: Philippines
- Original language: Tagalog
- No. of episodes: 102

Production
- Camera setup: Multiple-camera setup
- Running time: 42 minutes
- Production company: GMA News and Public Affairs

Original release
- Network: GMA Network
- Release: February 17, 2007 – February 28, 2009

Sine Totoo: The Best of Serbisyong Totoo (transl. cinema real: the best of real service)) is a Philippine television documentary show broadcast by GMA Network. Showcasing documentaries previously produced by the network, it premiered on February 17, 2007. The show concluded on February 28, 2009, with a total of 102 episodes.

== Shows featured ==
- I-Witness
- Pinoy Abroad
- Out!
- Reporter's Notebook
- Jessica Soho Reports
- Imbestigador
- Wish Ko Lang!
- Emergency
- 100% Pinoy!
- Pinoy Meets World
- Born to Be Wild
- Philippine Agenda
- Brigada Siete
- Extra Challenge
- Kapuso Mo, Jessica Soho
- At Your Service
- Kay Susan Tayo!

== Ratings ==
According to AGB Nielsen Philippines' Mega Manila household television ratings, the final episode of Sine Totoo: The Best of Serbisyong Totoo scored a 9.5% rating.
