= 14th PMPC Star Awards for Television =

- Date: October 7, 2000
- Location: UP Theater, Quezon City
- Presented by: Philippine Movie Press Club
- Hosted by: Pops Fernandez; Troy Montero; Dingdong Dantes; Ralion Alonzo; Kris Aquino

Television/radio coverage
- Network: RPN
- Produced by: Airtime Marketing Philippines, Inc.
- Directed by: Al Quinn

The 14th PMPC Star Awards for Television was held at the UP Theater, Quezon City on October 7, 2000 and was broadcast on RPN Channel 9 on Saturday Night Playhouse. The awards night was hosted by Pops Fernandez, Troy Montero, Dingdong Dantes, Ralion Alonzo and Kris Aquino and was directed by Al Quinn.

== Winners ==
Award	Winner
Best Children's Show	"Batang Batibot" (GMA 7)
Best Children's Show Host	"Five & Up Kids" (Five & Up, GMA 7)
Best Educational Program	"Beauty School Plus" (RPN 9)
Best Educational Program Host	"Ricky Reyes" (Beauty School Plus, RPN 9)
Best News Program	"Frontpage" (GMA 7)
Best Male Newscaster	"Mike Enriquez" (Saksi, GMA 7)
Best Female Newscaster	"Mel Tiangco" (Frontpage, GMA 7)
Best Magazine Show	"The Probe Team" (GMA 7)
Best Magazine Show Host	"Che Che Lazaro and Co." (The Probe Team, GMA 7)
Best Morning Show	"Alas Singko y Medya" (ABS-CBN 2)
Best Morning Show	"Christine Bersola & Julius Babao" (Alas Singko y Medya, ABS-CBN 2)
Best Public Affairs Program	"Debate Ni Pare At Mare" (GMA 7)
Best Public Affairs Program Host	"Winnie Monsod & Oscar Orbos" (Debate with Mare & Pare, GMA 7)
Best Documentary Program	"I-Witness" (GMA 7)
Best Celebrity Talk Show	"Partners Mel & Jay" (GMA 7) & "Today with Kris Aquino" (ABS-CBN 2)
Best Celebrity Talk Show Host	"Mel Tiangco & Jay Sonza" (Partners Mel & Jay, GMA 7) & "Kris Aquino" (Today With Kris Aquino, ABS-CBN 2)
Best Showbiz-Oriented Talk Show	"The Buzz" (ABS-CBN 2)
Best Male Showbiz-Oriented Talk Show Host	"Boy Abunda" (The Buzz, ABS-CBN 2)
Best Female Showbiz-Oriented Talk Show Host	"Kris Aquino" (The Buzz, ABS-CBN 2)
Best Youth Oriented Programs	"Tabing Ilog" (ABS-CBN 2)
Best Game Show	"Sing-Galing" (ABC 5)
Best Game Show Host	"Allan K & Ai Ai Delas Alas" (Sing-Galing, ABC 5)
Best New Male TV Personality	"James Blanco" ("Click", GMA 7)
Best New Female TV Personality	"Carla Guevara" (Star Drama Mini-Series: Bum, ABS-CBN 2)
Best Gag Show	"Bubble Gang" (GMA 7)
Best Comedy Show	"Kool Ka Lang" (GMA 7)
Best Comedy Actor	"Michael V." (Bubble Gang, GMA 7)
Best Comedy Actress	"Rufa Mae Quinto" (Ispup, ABC 5)
Best Drama Series	"Kirara (Ano Ang Kulay ng Pag-ibig?)" (GMA 7)
Best Drama Anthology	"Maalaala Mo Kaya?" (ABS-CBN 2)
Best Drama Mini-Series	"Pira-Pirasong Pangarap" (GMA 7)
Best Drama Actor	"Dominic Ochoa" (Labs Ko Si Babe, ABS-CBN 2)
Best Drama Actress	"Gladys Reyes" (Saan Ka Man Naroroon, ABS-CBN 2)
Best Variety Show	"Eat Bulaga" (GMA 7)
Best Musical Variety Shows	"ASAP" (ABS-CBN 2) & "SOP" (GMA 7)"
Best Musical & TV Special	"GMA Gold: The GMA 50th Anniversary Special" (GMA 7)
Best Male TV Host	"Janno Gibbs" (S.O.P., GMA 7)
Best Female TV Host	"Pops Fernandez" (ASAP, ABS-CBN 2)
Best Single Performance By an Actor	"Jericho Rosales" (Maalaala Mo Kaya: Pasa, ABS-CBN 2)
Best Single Performance By an Actress	"Lorna Tolentino" (Pira-Pirasong Pangarap: Tinig ng Kawalan, GMA 7)
Best TV Station	"GMA 7"

== Special awards ==
Award	Winner
2000 Ading Fernando Lifetime Achievement Award	"Tito Sotto, Vic Sotto & Joey De Leon"
Vic Silayan Memorial Award	"Alicia Alonzo"
Teen Star of the Night	"Desiree del Valle"
Male Star of the Night	"Jinggoy Estrada"
Female Star of the Night	"Pops Fernandez"
Special Citations	"Peabody Awardee" (GMA 7); ABS-CBN Worldwide Celebration of the New Millennium (ABS-CBN 2); GMA-Ayala Millennium Party (GMA 7)

== Most major wins ==
Wins by Network
Wins	Network
23	GMA 7
14	ABS-CBN 2
3	ABC 5
2	RPN 9

== Performers ==
- Janno Gibbs
- Ogie Alcasid
- Michael V.
- Keempee de Leon
- Ai-Ai delas Alas
