= Mel Tiangco =

Filipino television newscaster, host, and journalist (born 1955)

- Born: Carmela Corro Tiangco; August 10, 1955 (age 71); Bataan, Philippines
- Education: De La Salle University
- Occupation: Newscaster
- Years active: 1981–present
- Agents: ABS-CBN (1986–1996); GMA Network (1996–present)
- Spouse: Wenceslao Cornejo Jr. (m. 1975; ann. 1994)
- Children: 4

Carmela "Mel" Corro Tiangco (Tagalog pronunciation: [ˈtʃaŋkɔ]; born August 10, 1955) is a Filipino television newscaster and television host. She is one of the news pillars of GMA News, GMA Public Affairs and a multi-awarded news anchor.

== Biography ==
Carmela Corro Tiangco was born on August 10, 1955, in Bataan, to Arsenio Tiangco Sr. and Florencia Corro.

=== Media career ===
After graduating from De La Salle University, she became one of the leading presenters in Philippine television journal programs.

Tiangco's media career began in the last years of the Marcos presidency. She began in broadcasting when she was hired by government-owned MBS-4 as a newscaster after being discovered in an audition in RPN-9 by its network's news director Edwin Fargas. After the People Power Revolution in 1986, the former did not renew the workers' contracts. Meanwhile, she began in radio through DZXL of Radio Mindanao Network.

She joined ABS-CBN Corporation for a decade since 1986 — at that time, the network was newly-resurrrected and the station shared the same building with Channel 4 which later moved to its present site. Working first at DZMM, with Jay Sonza, they later hosted the program Mel and Jay, which later had its television counterpart, a Sunday talk show, since 1989. Meanwhile, she co-anchored the network's primetime newscast Balita Ngayon; and gained fame being one of the original anchors of the replacement program TV Patrol, which was premiered in 1987.

As Tiangco and Sonza transferred to GMA Network in 1996, they continued being the duo through the television program, yet renamed as Partners: Mel and Jay, and a program in DZBB-AM. In 2004, as Sonza sought for his failed senatorial bid, Tiangco went solo, and later hosted Mel & Joey with Joey de Leon.

Tiangco became the anchor for flagship newscasts; first being part of Saksi in 1996. She became the first solo anchorwoman for Frontpage: Ulat ni Mel Tiangco, a nightly newscast which premiered in 1999. She was the first to conduct exclusive interviews in 2001, especially of former president Joseph Estrada in the beginning of his detention in Camp Crame, and of his successor Gloria Macapagal-Arroyo upon her declaration of state of rebellion following a a siege near Malacañang. She has co-anchoring 24 Oras since its premiere in 2004.

Tiangco also currently hosts a weekly drama anthology Magpakailanman, whose first incarnation premiered in 2002.

Tiangco was also a co-host for public affairs show Sanib Puwersa with Arnold Clavio. She also hosted Powerhouse from 2011 to 2013 on GMA News TV.

Even prior to being part of GMA, Tiangco has been involved in public service and philanthropic acts. While in GMA, she served as the executive director of the network's public service arm Bisig Bayan; in 2002, she became part of the GMA Kapuso Foundation, the socio-civic arm, where she served as the executive vice president and chief operating officer (until April 2016).

=== Personal life ===
Tiangco married at a young age, but was annulled in 1994. She has four children, including musician Wency Cornejo (best known as the lead vocalist of rock band AfterImage which was active in the 1990s), as well as Ana Teresa, Melanie and Jose Miguel.

In 1997, Tiangco underwent angioplasty after suffering a massive heart attack, with a huge amount of blood being replaced to survive. It is said the reason being part of a socio-civic group, among her other missions.

=== Suspension and transfer to another network ===
On January 16, 1996, ABS-CBN suspended Tiangco for three months without pay as co-anchor of TV Patrol and Mel & Jay (then a radio program on DZMM), following her appearance on a television advertisement for Tide in December 1995, allegedly a violation of an earlier-issued circular prohibiting news personalities from doing so without the network's prior approval, which was considered a breach of company rules. Reportedly, this is universally enforced in all print and broadcast meant to avoid any suspicions of bias or favoritism.

She then went on indefinite leave of absence; while Sonza resigned. Both transferred to GMA.

==== Complaint against ABS-CBN on her dismissal ====
On March 11, 1996, Tiangco filed a complaint against ABS-CBN Corporation for illegal dismissal and illegal suspension, as well as monetary claims. In April 1999, the Labor Arbiter ruled in Tiangco's favor. The said decision was later reversed in July 2006 by the National Labor Relations Commission, arguing that Tiangco and her co-host Jay Sonza (as also ruled by the Supreme Court in 2004, which eventually affirming the Labor Arbiter's dismissal of his own petition) are "independent contractors."

The decision was elevated to the Court of Appeals on the ground of grave abuse of discretion. The parties executed and signed a partial settlement agreement, dated December 15, 2011, wherein Tiangco agreed that ABS-CBN paid her in full the amount covering specific monetary claims.

The said agreement was approved by the CA in its January 27, 2012, decision which also declared that the other issues in the case were already moot.

Tiangco then filed the petition for review questioning the CA ruling, which was later dismissed by the SC which upheld the earlier ruling and decided that Tiangco is not entitled to the claims as she is an independent contractor. The ruling, dated December 6, 2021, only publicly released on June 2, 2022.

==== Complaint by ABS-CBN on her transfer to GMA ====
Also in 1996, ABS-CBN Broadcasting Corporation filed a lawsuit against the two and GMA Network, Inc. before the Quezon City Regional Trial Court to oblige them to comply to the contract banning them from working in any other media station for a year after they left the former network.

The court ruled on June 26, 1998, validating their cancellation of their contracts with ABS-CBN, as well as their transfer to GMA which had no hand over their decision.

The CA upheld the said decision on August 6, 2003, citing lack of evidence that Tiangco violated the prohibition upon her appearance in a television advertisement, justifying her unilateral action in dissolving the agreement, and considering the fact that Sonza is redundant without her in the show.

ABS-CBN later filed an appeal to reverse the ruling, which was dismissed by the SC, in a December 13, 2010, resolution, "for failure to sufficiently show any reversible error" in the CA's decision.

According to GMA Network, the network's act of suspension to Tiangco without solid proof and legal basis is a grave breach of contract, and supports her termination of the contract.

Despite the issue, Tiangco garnered support from the public. In the anniversary press conference for her show Magpakailanman on February 18, 2013, she said that she has already forgiven her former network. While she likened her experience in her former network similar to a cockroach being trampled on, she stated that she has already moved on from the suspension incident as she felt "vindicated" by her accomplishments in her current network and her program's success in the Philippine television.

== Television programs ==
Year	Title
1986–1987	Balita Ngayon
1987–1996	TV Patrol
1989–1996	Mel & Jay
1990	Palibhasa Lalake: 3rd Anniversary Special
1995	Oki Doki Doc
1996–2004	Partners Mel & Jay
1996–1999	Saksi
1999–2004	Frontpage: Ulat ni Mel Tiangco
2001–2002	Debate (Fill-in host for Winnie Monsod.)
2001	Unang Hirit
2002–2007; 2012–present	Magpakailanman
2004	Partners with Mel Tiangco
2004–2011	Mel & Joey
2004–present	24 Oras
2007	Philippine Agenda
2011	Sanib Puwersa
2011–2013	Power House

== Awards ==
=== 1988, 1990 ===
- Best Female Newscaster, Star Awards for Television, Philippine Movie Press Club

=== 1990 ===
- Presidential Medallion, Presidential Awardee for Work for the Welfare of the Disabled, Apolinario Mabini Award

=== 1991–1992 ===
- Broadcast Journalism Award, Public Service on Radio (Mel & Jay DZMM), Rotary Club of Manila
- TOWNS Awardee, The Outstanding Women in Nation Service (Public Service & Journalism)

=== 1990–1996 ===
- Best Female Newscaster, Star Awards for Television, Philippine Movie Press Club

=== 1990–1993 ===
- Pinakamahusay na Programa sa Telebisyon, Gawad Cultural Center of the Philippines Awards for TV, Mel & Jay

=== 1990–1996 ===
- Best Female Television Talkshow Host, Star Awards for Television, Philippine Movie Press Club (Hall of Fame)

=== 1994 ===
- Commendation: Humanitarian Concern, House Resolution No. 35-Series 1995, House of Representatives, Republic of the Philippines
- Lifetime Achievement Award, ABS-CBN Broadcasting Corp.
- Gintong Ina Awardee, Celebrity Mother of the Year, Golden Mother & Father Foundation, Inc.

=== 1994–1995 ===
- Gintong Ina Awardee, Single Parent of the Year, Golden Mother & Father Foundation

=== 1994 ===
- Presidential Awardee, Best Non-Government Organization in Public Service, Armed Forces of the Philippines
- Presidential Awardee, First Media People's Award
- Best Magazine Talk Show Host, Star Awards for Television
- Best Female Newscaster, Star Awards for Television
- Best Female Celebrity Talk show host, Star Awards for Television

=== 1995–1997 ===
- Best Female Newscaster, Star Awards for Television

=== 1996 ===
- Finalist, New York International TV Festival, Mel & Jay, TV Host

=== 1998 ===
- Finalist, Asian Television Awards, Singapore
- Ka Doroy Broadcaster of the Year Award, KBP Golden Dove Awards

=== 2000 ===
- Trailblazer Award, Outstanding Alumna, St. Theresa's College

=== 2001 ===
- Paralegal ng Bayan Awardee, 16th Huwarang Pilipino Award for Media & Journalism
- He & She (HAS) Club Awardee, Outstanding Woman of Bataan
- Woman of Distinction Award, Soroptimist International
- Best Female Newscaster, Star Awards for Television
- Best Female Broadcaster for Television, KBP Golden Dove Awards

=== 2002 ===
- Best Talk Show/Program Host-TV, Partners Mel & Jay, 12th KBP Golden Dove Awards
- Best Female Newscaster, Frontpage, Star Awards for Television
- Outstanding Citizen of Quezon City for Mass Media

=== 2004 ===
- Outstanding Broadcast Journalist & Social Servant, Gusi Peace Prize Award
- Outstanding Host for Partners Mel & Jay, 1st Golden Screen Awards for Television
- Woman of Distinction Award, Soroptimist International

=== 2006 ===
- Most Outstanding Female News Presenter of the Year, COMGUILD Center for Journalism

=== 2008 ===
- Most Outstanding Female News Presenter, COMGUILD Center for Journalism

=== 2012 ===
- Anak TV Makabata Hall of Famers Award
- People of the Year, People Asia Magazine

=== 2013 ===
- Edukcircle MOPIP TV Awards

Year	Award-giving body	Category	Nominated work	Results	Ref.
2000	14th PMPC Star Awards for Television	Best Celebrity Talk Show Hosts (Note: Shared with fellow host Jay Sonza.) (Note: Tied with Kris Aquino.)	Partners Mel and Jay (GMA-7)	Won	
2001	15th PMPC Star Awards for Television	Best Celebrity Talk Show Host	Partners Mel and Jay (GMA-7)	Won	
2001	15th PMPC Star Awards for Television	Best Female Newscaster	Frontpage: Ulat ni Mel Tiangco (GMA-7)	Won	
2001	11th Golden Dove Awards	Best TV Newscaster	—	Won	
