= Dream Home (talk show) =

Philippine television talk show

- Title card as Power House
- Also known as: Power House (Note: 2011–16.)
- Genre: Lifestyle; Talk show
- Written by: Paul Salbarin
- Directed by: King Baco
- Presented by: Mel Tiangco; Kara David
- Country of origin: Philippines
- Original languages: Tagalog; English

Production
- Executive producer: Brian M. Geli
- Editors: Juden Casidsid; Noli Enero; Nino Bautista; Martha Jose; Erdie Libayan; Erwin Logina; Piah Luna; Emmanuel Payumo
- Camera setup: Multiple-camera setup
- Running time: 22–45 minutes
- Production company: GMA News and Public Affairs

Original release
- Network: GMA News TV (2011–14); GMA Network (2014–16)
- Release: February 28, 2011 – April 29, 2016

Dream Home, formerly Power House is a Philippine television talk show broadcast on GMA News TV and GMA Network. Originally hosted by Mel Tiangco, it premiered on February 28, 2011. The show concluded on April 29, 2016. Kara David served as the final host from 2013 to 2016.

== Hosts ==
- Mel Tiangco (2011–13)
- Kara David (2013–16)

== Accolades ==
Accolades received by Power House
Year	Award	Category	Recipient	Result	Ref.
2012	26th PMPC Star Awards for Television	Best Celebrity Talk Show Host	Mel Tiangco	Nominated	
2013	10th Golden Screen TV Awards	Outstanding Lifestyle Program	Power House	Nominated	
2013	10th Golden Screen TV Awards	Outstanding Lifestyle Program Host	Mel Tiangco	Nominated	
2015	29th PMPC Star Awards for Television	Best Celebrity Talk Show	Power House	Nominated	
2016	30th PMPC Star Awards for Television	Best Magazine Show	Power House	Nominated	
2016	30th PMPC Star Awards for Television	Best Magazine Show Host	Kara David	Nominated	
