= Oh No! It's Johnny! =

- Genre: Late-night talk show
- Created by: Silverstar Communications, Inc.
- Written by: Fe Ramirez; Aileen Paredes; Tina Rivera; Jeffrey Remigio
- Directed by: Zaldy Bonalos; Arnel Jacobe
- Presented by: Johnny Litton
- Theme music composer: Greg Caro
- Country of origin: Philippines
- Original languages: English; Tagalog
- No. of episodes: 618

Production
- Executive producers: Leo Katigbak; Marie D. Mamawal
- Running time: 60 minutes
- Production companies: ABS-CBN Entertainment; Silverstar Communications, Inc.

Original release
- Network: ABS-CBN
- Release: October 7, 1987 – August 15, 1999

Oh No! It's Johnny! was a Philippine weekly late night talk show aired on ABS-CBN from October 7, 1987 to August 15, 1999. It is hosted by Johnny Litton. The TV show was co-produced by Silverstar Communications, Inc.

In August 2020, the series returned as a web talk show.

== History ==
Johnny Litton, a seasoned television personality, has been in the small tube since the 1970s.

Oh No! It's Johnny premiered on ABS-CBN on October 7, 1987, and was hosted by Johnny Litton. It originally aired every Wednesday night. The show was produced by Roselle Rebano of Silverstar Communications, Inc. and was similar in feel and format to American late night talk shows.

In 1992, Maurice Arcache joined the show as co-host. He popularized his "Arcachat" segment, which gave social and etiquette tips weekly.

In 1995, Oh No! It's Johnny was moved to Friday night and then Sunday night in 1997.

The show ended in August 15, 1999 coinciding the expiration of the Silverstar's contract to ABS-CBN, after almost 12 years of airing. As a result, it was occupied by The Weekend News on its Sunday night timeslot.

== OhNLINE It's JOHNNY! ==
On June 25, 2020, Johnny Litton announced on Facebook that the show would return online as a response to the COVID-19 pandemic. The show premiered in August 2020.

== Hosts ==
=== Main host ===
- Johnny Litton

=== Co-hosts ===
- Maurice Arcache (+) (1992–1999)
