= Bread N' Butter =

- Genre: Travel
- Created by: Progressive Broadcasting Corporation and DSR Multimedia Productions Inc.
- Developed by: UNTV 37
- Presented by: Rodel Flordeliz; Kitt Meily; Arlene Razon
- Country of origin: Philippines

Production
- Executive producer: Rodel Flordeliz
- Running time: 45 minutes

Original release
- Network: UNTV
- Release: July 12, 2004 – 2005
- Release: July 23, 2008 – July 12, 2016

Related
- Serbisyong Kasangbahay

Bread N' Butter is a Philippine television educational show broadcast by UNTV. Originally hosted by Jorel Ramirez and Lynley Teng, it aired July 12, 2004 to 2005. The show returned from July 23, 2008 to July 12, 2016. Rodel Flordeliz, Kitt Meily and Arlene Razon serve as the final hosts. The program described itself as a show "that would inspire Filipinos to discover their entrepreneurial sense". The program format is similar to a travel documentary where the main hosts venture and visit various kinds of business establishments. It also featured solutions to business problems, which they claim to be helpful to the business-minded audience.

== Hosts ==
Final hosts

- Rodel Flordeliz (2008-2016)
- Kitt Meily (2008-2016)
- Arlene Razon (2008-2016)

Former hosts

- Jorel Ramirez (2004-2005)
- Lynley Teng (2004-2005, 2008)

== Awards ==
Year	Association	Category	Nominee(s)	Result
2009	AnakTV	AnakTV Seal Award	Bread N' Butter	Awarded
2010	AnakTV	AnakTV Seal Award	Bread N' Butter	Awarded
2011	AnakTV	AnakTV Seal Award	Bread N' Butter	Awarded
2012	AnakTV	AnakTV Seal Award	Bread N' Butter	Awarded
2013	AnakTV	AnakTV Seal Award	Bread N' Butter	Awarded
2014	AnakTV	AnakTV Seal Award	Bread N' Butter	Awarded
2015	AnakTV	AnakTV Seal Award	Bread N' Butter	Awarded
2016	AnakTV	AnakTV Seal Award	Bread N' Butter	Awarded
