= Sanib Puwersa =

2011 Philippine television documentary show

- Title card
- Genre: Documentary
- Presented by: Arnold Clavio; Mel Tiangco
- Country of origin: Philippines
- Original language: Tagalog

Production
- Camera setup: Multiple-camera setup
- Running time: 45 minutes
- Production company: GMA News and Public Affairs

Original release
- Network: GMA Network
- Release: October 23 – November 13, 2011

Sanib Puwersa (transl. join forces) is a 2011 Philippine television documentary and public service show broadcast by GMA Network. Hosted by Mel Tiangco and Arnold Clavio, it premiered on October 23, 2011. The show concluded on November 13, 2011.

== Episodes ==
Sanib Puwersa episodes
No.	Title	Original release date
1	"Salpukan" (transl. collision)	October 23, 2011
2	"Mabigat na Kalbaryo" (transl. heavy calvary)	October 30, 2011
3	"Pagbangon" (transl. awakening)	November 6, 2011
4	"Toilet Humor"	November 13, 2011

== Ratings ==
According to AGB Nielsen Philippines' Mega Manila People/Individual television ratings, the pilot episode of Sanib Puwersa earned an 8.7% rating.
