= Saksi =

Philippine television news show

- Title card since 2026
- Also known as: Saksi: GMA Headline Balita; Saksi: Liga ng Katotohanan
- Genre: News broadcasting
- Directed by: Conrado Lumabas III
- Presented by: Mike Enriquez; Karen Davila; Mel Tiangco; Jay Sonza; Vicky Morales; Bernadette Sembrano; Arnold Clavio; Pia Arcangel
- Country of origin: Philippines
- Original language: Tagalog

Production
- Executive producer: Don Dave Ventura
- Production locations: Studio 5, GMA Network Center, Quezon City, Philippines
- Running time: 30 minutes
- Production company: GMA News

Original release
- Network: GMA Network
- Release: October 2, 1995 – present

Saksi (transl. witness), formerly known as Saksi: GMA Headline Balita and Saksi: Liga ng Katotohanan, is a Philippine television news broadcasting show broadcast by GMA Network. Originally anchored by Mike Enriquez and Karen Davila, it premiered on October 2, 1995, on the network's evening line up. Pia Arcangel currently serves as the anchor. It is the longest-running news broadcasting show of GMA Network.

== Overview ==
Saksi premiered on October 2, 1995, with Mike Enriquez and Karen Davila as its original anchors.

On July 8, 1996, Mel Tiangco joined the show. Segment reporters who also joined the show include Solita "Winnie" Monsod for Mareng Winnie, Kara David for Huling Hirit, Lyn Ching for S na S (Showbiz sa Saksi) and Jessica Soho for Jessica Soho Reports. In 1998, when Enriquez and Davila left the show, Jay Sonza and Luchi Cruz-Valdes joined the show.

On August 16, 1999, Enriquez returned to the program, whereas Vicky Morales joined the show. This was also the beginning of simulcasting the newscast on the network's radio station, Super Radyo DZBB 594 kHz. On July 15, 2002, Howie Severino joined the show as anchor of segment Side Trip. In the same year, Saksi won the gold medal for Best Newscast in the New York Festival, becoming one of the few news programs outside the United States to receive the said honor. The award was later recognized by the Philippine Congress by issuing the network a commendation for its work in News and Public Affairs. On March 12, 2004, Enriquez left the newscast to join Frontpage: Ulat ni Mel Tiangco anchor Tiangco as anchors of 24 Oras. Three days later, Arnold Clavio joined as the new host.

The show launched a segment called Saksi Ako (transl. I am a witness), where viewers can make their own report there by using cellphone and camera recordings via GMA Network app's Youscoop. In July 2013, it launched its segment Midnight Snack, a food-trip segment hosted by Mikael Daez every Mondays to Thursdays, After a one-week hiatus, On November 5, 2013, it returned under the new title Midnight Express.

In November 2014, Pia Arcangel joined as an co-anchor, replacing Morales. In April 2020, the show was suspended due to the enhanced community quarantine in Luzon caused by the COVID-19 pandemic. The show resumed its programming on June 1, 2020.

On June 12, 2024, Clavio temporarily left the newscast due to his hemorrhagic stroke.

On October 28, 2024, due to GMA Integrated News' cost reduction, Arcangel became the sole anchor of the news show. Clavio also left the show, to reduce his working time.

== Anchors ==
Anchors

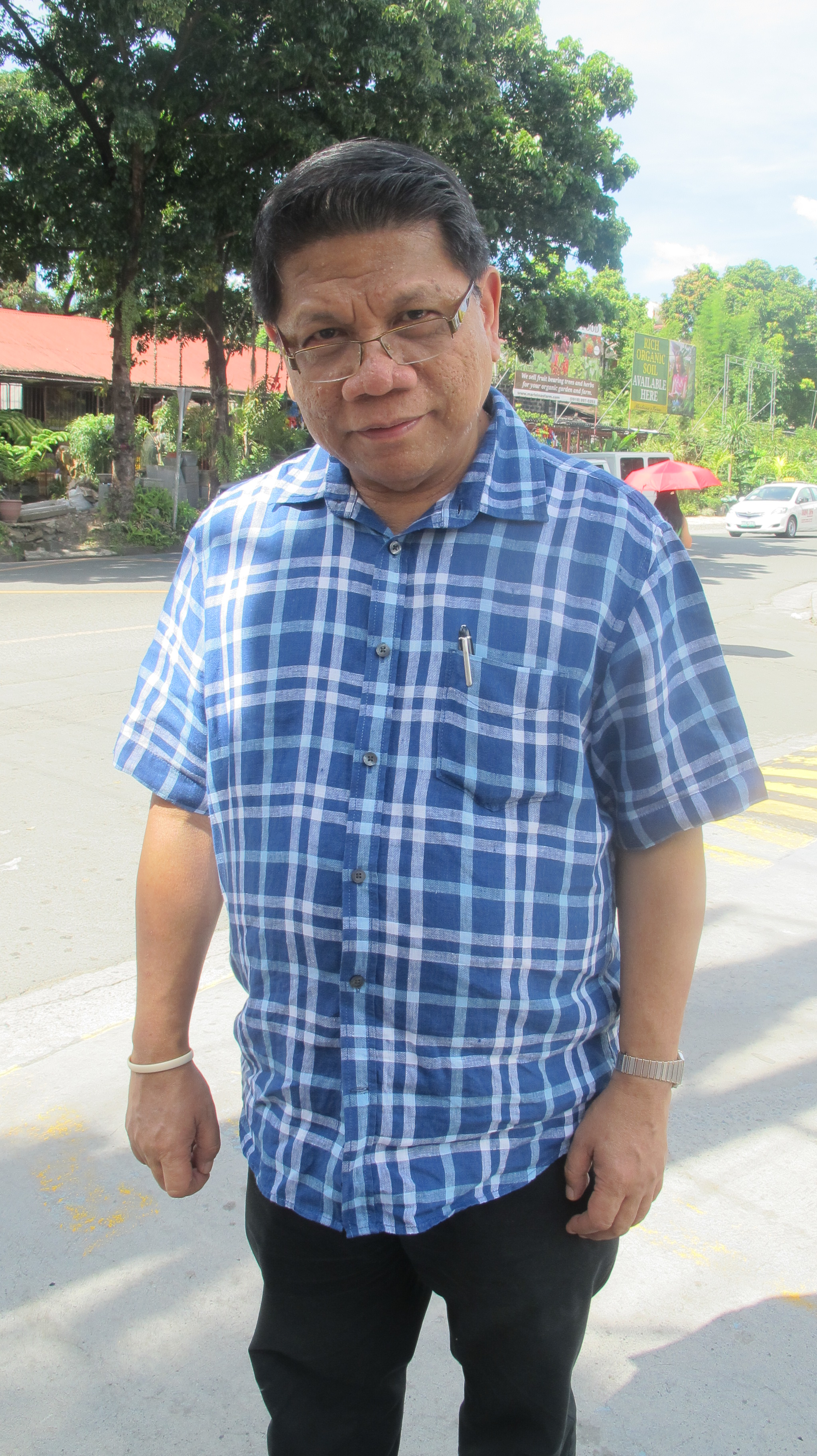
Mike Enriquez

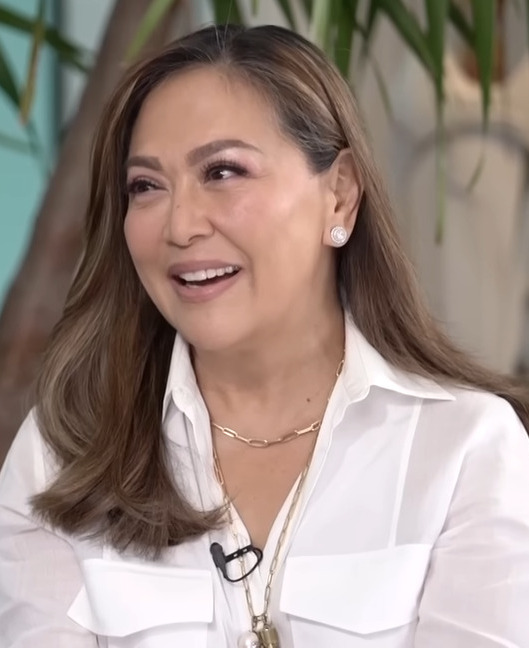
Karen Davila

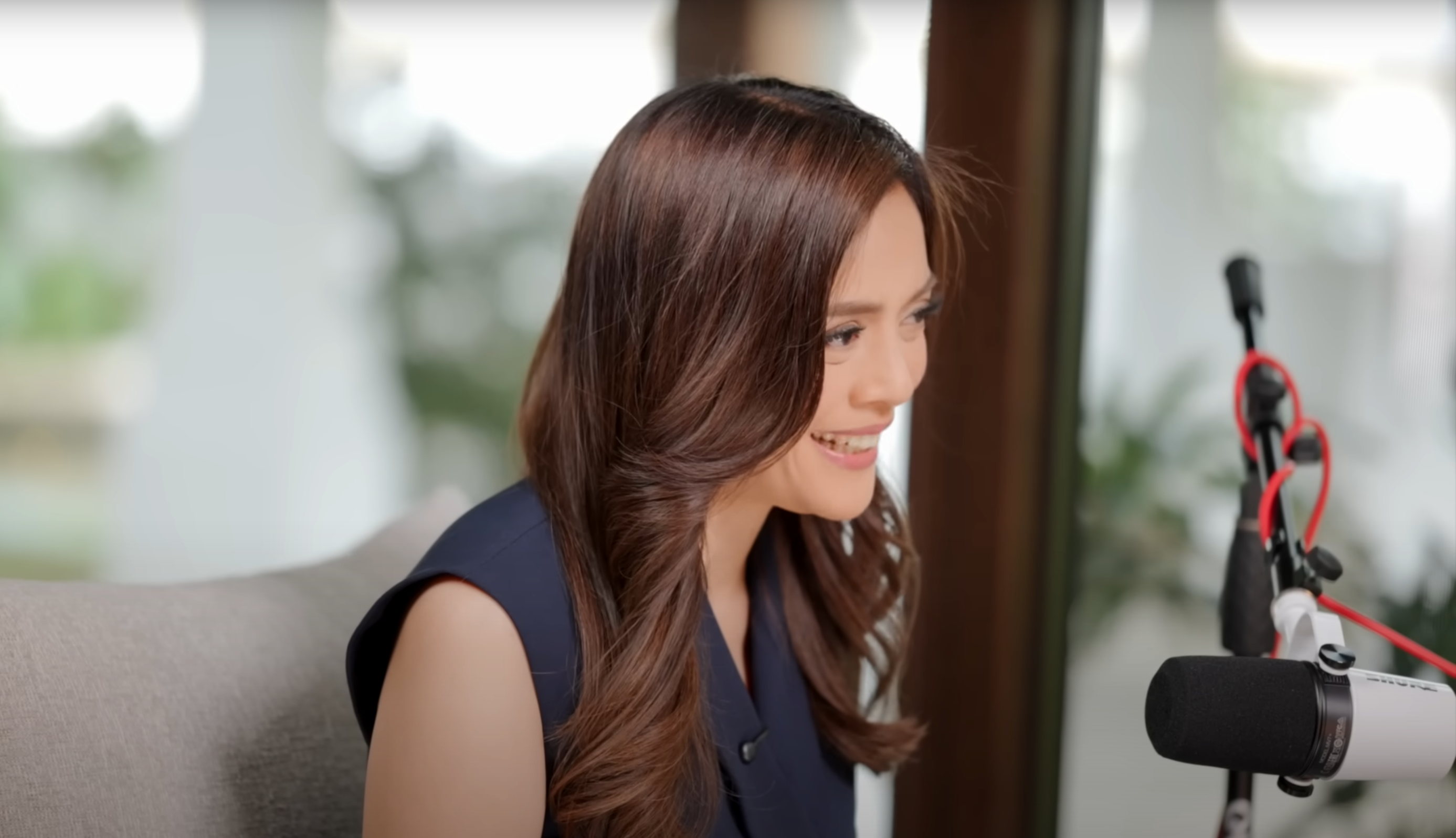
Vicky Morales

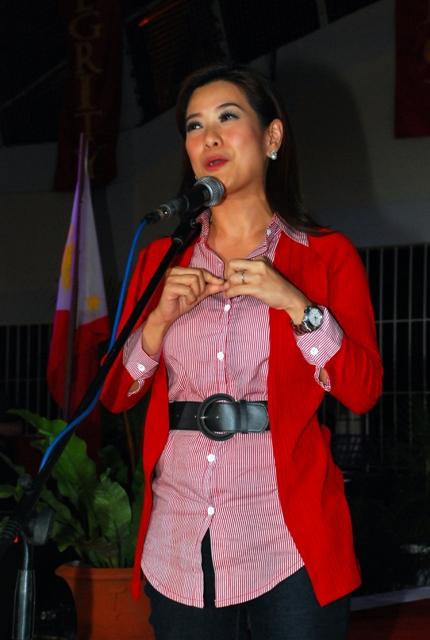
Bernadette Sembrano

- Pia Arcangel (since 2014)
- Amor Larrosa (since 2023, GMA Integrated News Weather Center)

Former anchors

- Mike Enriquez (1995–2004)
- Karen Davila (1995–98)
- Mel Tiangco (1996–99)
- Winnie Monsod (1996–99, Mareng Winnie)
- Lyn Ching (1996–99, S na S: Showbiz na Saksi)
- Kara David (1996–99, Huling Hirit)
- Jessica Soho (1996–99, Jessica Soho Reports)
- Amado Pineda (1995–96, weatherman)
- Rey Pacheco (1996–99, weatherman)
- Jay Sonza (1998–99)
- Luchi Cruz-Valdes (1998–99)
- Vicky Morales (1999–2014)
- Howie Severino (2002, Side Trip)
- Bernadette Sembrano (2003)
- Arnold Clavio (2004–24)
- Mikael Daez (2013–23, Midnight Express)

Interim anchors

- Luchi Cruz-Valdes (1995–2002)
- Jay Taruc (1997–98)
- Sandra Aguinaldo (2013–23)
- Lala Roque (2013–16)
- Rhea Santos (2013)
- Mariz Umali (2013, 2017–23)
- Tina Panganiban-Perez (2013, 2019–24)
- Kara David (2013–14)
- Ivan Mayrina (2013)
- Jun Veneracion (2014–21)
- Raffy Tima (2013, 2019–23)
- Susan Enriquez (2017, 2018–20)
- Chino Gaston (2020–23)
- Emil Sumangil (2016, 2019, 2021)
- Joseph Morong (2012, 2019–21)
- Oscar Oida (2015, 2019)
- Maki Pulido (2012–13)
- Mark Salazar (2012, 2015)
- Connie Sison (2023)
- Ian Cruz (2023)
- Atom Araullo (2023)
- Mav Gonzales (2023)

== Segments ==
- Barangay Saksi
- Bonus Shot
- Midnight Express
- News Bullets (Mabilis na Sulyap)
- Sakcess
- Showbiz Saksi
- Sports Saksi
- Good Night Vibes

Defunct

- Bisig Bayan
- Huling Hirit
- Jessica Soho Reports
- Mareng Winnie
- Midnight Snack
- S na S: Showbiz na Saksi
- Side Trip

== Accolades ==
Accolades received by Saksi
Year	Award	Category	Recipient	Result	Ref.
1996	10th PMPC Star Awards for Television	Best News Program	Saksi	Won	
1997	11th PMPC Star Awards for Television	Best Male Newscaster	Mike Enriquez	Won	
1998	Peabody Award		Saksi	Won	
1998	12th PMPC Star Awards for Television	Best News Program	Saksi	Won	
2000	14th PMPC Star Awards for Television	Best Male Newscaster	Mike Enriquez	Won	
2002	New York Festival Gold Medal	Best Newscast	Saksi	Won	
2003	17th PMPC Star Awards for Television	Best News Program	Saksi	Nominated	
2003	17th PMPC Star Awards for Television	Best Female Newscaster	Vicky Morales	Nominated	
2003	17th PMPC Star Awards for Television	Best Male Newscaster	Mike Enriquez	Nominated	
2004	18th PMPC Star Awards for Television	Best News Program	Saksi	Nominated	
2004	18th PMPC Star Awards for Television	Best Female Newscaster	Vicky Morales	Nominated	
2004	18th PMPC Star Awards for Television	Best Male Newscaster	Arnold Clavio	Nominated	
2005	19th PMPC Star Awards for Television	Best News Program	Saksi	Nominated	
2005	19th PMPC Star Awards for Television	Best Female Newscaster	Vicky Morales	Won	
2005	19th PMPC Star Awards for Television	Best Male Newscaster	Arnold Clavio	Nominated	
2006	20th PMPC Star Awards for Television	Best News Program	Saksi	Nominated	
2006	20th PMPC Star Awards for Television	Best Female Newscaster	Vicky Morales	Won	
2006	20th PMPC Star Awards for Television	Best Male Newscaster	Arnold Clavio	Nominated	
2007	21st PMPC Star Awards for Television	Best News Program	Saksi	Nominated	
2007	21st PMPC Star Awards for Television	Best Female Newscaster	Vicky Morales	Nominated	
2007	21st PMPC Star Awards for Television	Best Male Newscaster	Arnold Clavio	Nominated	
2008	22nd PMPC Star Awards for Television	Best News Program	Saksi	Nominated	
2008	22nd PMPC Star Awards for Television	Best Female Newscaster	Vicky Morales	Won	
2008	22nd PMPC Star Awards for Television	Best Male Newscaster	Arnold Clavio	Nominated	
2009	23rd PMPC Star Awards for Television	Best News Program	Saksi	Nominated	
2009	23rd PMPC Star Awards for Television	Best Female Newscaster	Vicky Morales	Nominated	
2009	New York Festival	Best Newscast, Gold Medal	Saksi	Won	
2010	24th PMPC Star Awards for Television	Best News Program	Saksi	Nominated	
2010	24th PMPC Star Awards for Television	Best Female Newscaster	Vicky Morales	Nominated	
2011	8th Golden Screen TV Awards	Outstanding News Program	Saksi	Nominated	
2011	8th Golden Screen TV Awards	Outstanding Male News Presenter	Arnold Clavio	Nominated	
2011	8th Golden Screen TV Awards	Outstanding Female News Presenter	Vicky Morales	Nominated	
2011	25th PMPC Star Awards for Television	Best News Program	Saksi	Nominated	
2011	25th PMPC Star Awards for Television	Best Female Newscaster	Vicky Morales	Won	
2012	26th PMPC Star Awards for Television	Best News Program	Saksi	Nominated	
2012	26th PMPC Star Awards for Television	Best Female Newscaster	Vicky Morales	Won	
2013	10th Golden Screen TV Awards	Outstanding News Program	Saksi	Nominated	
2013	10th Golden Screen TV Awards	Outstanding Male News Presenter	Arnold Clavio	Nominated	
2013	10th Golden Screen TV Awards	Outstanding Female News Presenter	Vicky Morales	Won	
2013	27th PMPC Star Awards for Television	Best News Program	Saksi	Nominated	
2013	27th PMPC Star Awards for Television	Best Female Newscaster	Vicky Morales	Nominated	
2014	Golden Screen TV Awards	Outstanding News Program	"Typhoon Pablo's Trail of Death"	Nominated	
2014	Golden Screen TV Awards	Outstanding Male News Presenter	Arnold Clavio	Nominated	
2014	Golden Screen TV Awards	Outstanding Female News Presenter	Vicky Morales	Nominated	
2014	Peabody Award		Saksi	Won	
2014	28th PMPC Star Awards for Television	Best News Program	Saksi	Nominated	
2014	28th PMPC Star Awards for Television	Best Female Newscaster	Vicky Morales	Nominated	
2014	28th PMPC Star Awards for Television	Best Male Newscaster	Arnold Clavio	Nominated	
2015	29th PMPC Star Awards for Television	Best News Program	Saksi	Nominated	
2015	29th PMPC Star Awards for Television	Best Female Newscaster	Pia Arcangel	Nominated	
2015	29th PMPC Star Awards for Television	Best Male Newscaster	Arnold Clavio	Nominated	
2016	30th PMPC Star Awards for Television	Best News Program	Saksi	Nominated	
2016	30th PMPC Star Awards for Television	Best Female Newscaster	Pia Arcangel	Nominated	
2016	30th PMPC Star Awards for Television	Best Male Newscaster	Arnold Clavio	Nominated	
2017	31st PMPC Star Awards for Television	Best News Program	Saksi	Nominated	
2017	31st PMPC Star Awards for Television	Best Female Newscaster	Pia Arcangel	Nominated	
2017	31st PMPC Star Awards for Television	Best Male Newscaster	Arnold Clavio	Won	
2018	32nd PMPC Star Awards for Television	Best News Program	Saksi	Nominated	
2018	32nd PMPC Star Awards for Television	Best Male Newscaster	Arnold Clavio	Nominated	
2019	33rd PMPC Star Awards for Television	Best News Program	Saksi	Nominated	
2019	33rd PMPC Star Awards for Television	Best Female Newscaster	Pia Arcangel	Nominated	
2019	33rd PMPC Star Awards for Television	Best Male Newscaster	Arnold Clavio	Nominated	
2020	Gandingan 2020: The 14th UPLB Isko't Iska Multi-media Awards	Best News Anchors	Arnold Clavio	Won	
2020	Gandingan 2020: The 14th UPLB Isko't Iska Multi-media Awards	Best News Anchors	Pia Arcangel	Won	
2021	34th PMPC Star Awards for Television	Best Male Newscaster	Arnold Clavio	Nominated	
2021	34th PMPC Star Awards for Television	Best News Program	Saksi	Nominated	
2023	35th PMPC Star Awards for Television	Best Female Newscaster	Pia Arcangel	Nominated	
2023	35th PMPC Star Awards for Television	Best Male Newscaster	Arnold Clavio	Nominated	
2023	35th PMPC Star Awards for Television	Best News Program	Saksi	Nominated	
2025	38th PMPC Star Awards for Television	Best Female Newscaster	Pia Arcangel	Nominated	
2025	38th PMPC Star Awards for Television	Best Male Newscaster	Arnold Clavio	Nominated	
2025	38th PMPC Star Awards for Television	Best News Program	Saksi	Nominated	
2025	37th PMPC Star Awards for Television	Best Female Newscaster	Pia Arcangel	Nominated	
2025	37th PMPC Star Awards for Television	Best Male Newscaster	Arnold Clavio	Nominated	
2025	37th PMPC Star Awards for Television	Best News Program	Saksi	Nominated	
