= Partners with Mel Tiangco =

2004 Philippine television talk show

- Title card
- Genre: Talk show
- Presented by: Mel Tiangco
- Country of origin: Philippines
- Original language: Tagalog
- No. of episodes: 24

Production
- Camera setup: Multiple-camera setup
- Running time: 90 minutes
- Production company: GMA Entertainment TV

Original release
- Network: GMA Network
- Release: February 15 – July 25, 2004

Related
- Mel & Joey

Partners with Mel Tiangco is a 2004 Philippine television talk show broadcast by GMA Network. Hosted by Mel Tiangco, it premiered on February 15, 2004. The show concluded on July 25, 2004, with a total of 24 episodes.
