= Philippine Agenda =

2007 Philippine television public affairs show

- Title card
- Genre: Public affairs
- Presented by: Jessica Soho; Mike Enriquez; Mel Tiangco; Arnold Clavio; Vicky Morales
- Country of origin: Philippines
- Original language: Tagalog
- No. of episodes: 8

Production
- Camera setup: Multiple-camera setup
- Running time: 60 minutes
- Production company: GMA News and Public Affairs

Original release
- Network: GMA Network
- Release: March 25 – May 13, 2007

Philippine Agenda is a 2007 Philippine television public affairs show broadcast by GMA Network. The show focuses on the 2007 Philippine general election. Hosted by Jessica Soho, Mel Tiangco, Vicky Morales, Mike Enriquez and Arnold Clavio, it premiered on March 25, 2007. The show concluded on May 13, 2007, with a total of eight episodes.

== Episodes ==
Hosts

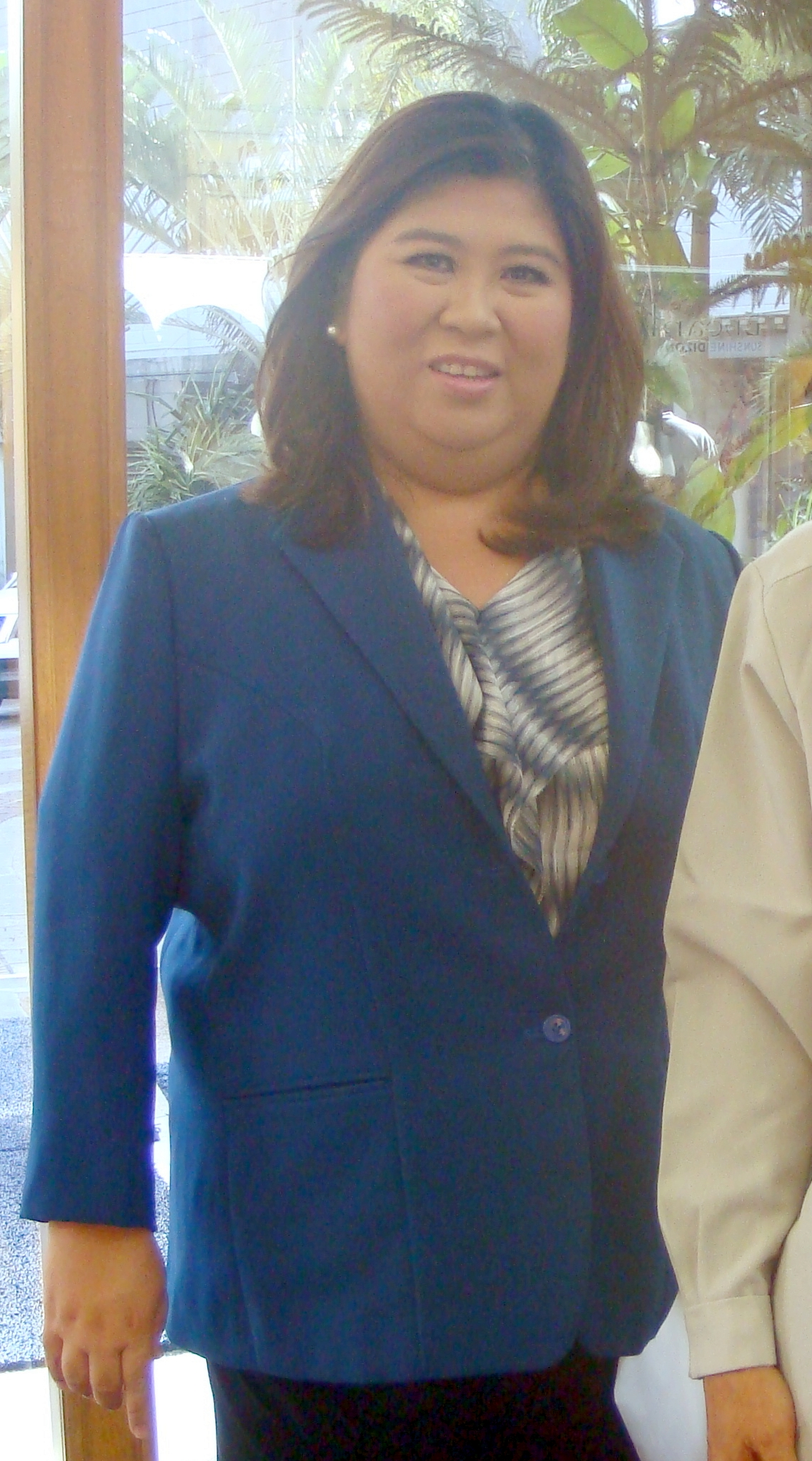
Jessica Soho

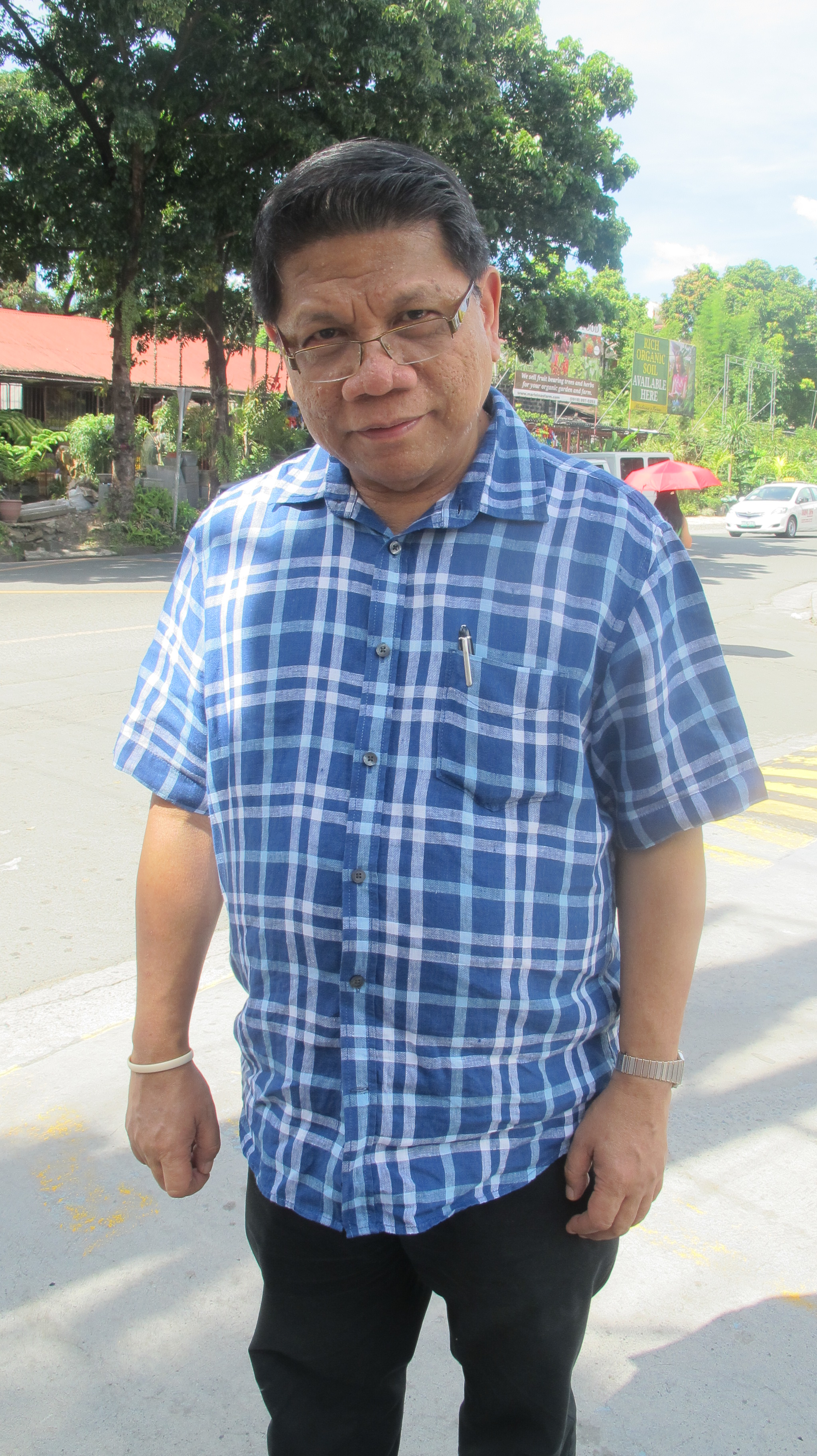
Mike Enriquez

Episodes of Philippine Agenda
| Episode | Original air date | Host | No. |
|---|---|---|---|
| Education | March 25, 2007 | Jessica Soho | 1 |
Jessica Soho discusses the deteriorating system of education in the Philippines.
| Healthcare | April 1, 2007 | Arnold Clavio | 2 |
Arnold Clavio examines the healthcare system in the country.
| Corruption | April 8, 2007 | Mike Enriquez | 3 |
Mike Enriquez investigates the widespread corruption in the government. Philippine Agenda finds several anomalous projects in different parts of the country.
| Housing | April 15, 2007 | Mel Tiangco | 4 |
Mel Tiangco discusses the problems of housing in the Philippines and what are the long-term plans of the government that will address this issue.
| Jobs | April 22, 2007 | Vicky Morales | 5 |
Vicky Morales analyzes why most Filipinos prefer to work in other countries than in the Philippines and why do most people are still unemployed.
| Hunger | April 29, 2007 | Mike Enriquez | 6 |
Mike Enriquez tackles the effects of undernourishment and the issues surrounding hunger.
| Crime and Justice | May 6, 2007 | Arnold Clavio | 7 |
Arnold Clavio investigates how the government handles the situation of criminality and justice in the country and the issues surrounding the judicial system.
| Electoral reform | May 13, 2007 | Jessica Soho | 8 |
Jessica Soho examines how the electoral process works in the Philippines.
