= Tapatan with Jay Sonza =

Philippine television public affairs show

- Genre: Public affairs
- Presented by: Jay Sonza
- Country of origin: Philippines
- Original language: Tagalog

Production
- Camera setup: Multiple-camera setup
- Running time: 30 minutes
- Production companies: GMA News and Public Affairs (1995-98); RPN News and Public Affairs (2000-01)

Original release
- Network: GMA Network (1995-98); Radio Philippines Network (2000-01); UNTV (2004–05)
- Release: May 17, 1995 – 2005

Tapatan with Jay Sonza: Bayan, Ikaw ang Humatol (transl. face to face with Jay Sonza: nation, you judge) is a Philippine television public affairs debate show broadcast by GMA Network. Hosted by Jay Sonza, it premiered on May 17, 1995. The show concluded on November 11, 1998.

The show later moved to Radio Philippines Network in 2000. In 2004, the show moved once again to UNTV. The show had a radio edition that had been broadcast by four radio stations in AM band. DZBB, it moved to DZRH and later DZXL and DZIQ. The show had radio spin-offs, Tapatan with Jay and Deo and Tapatan in DZIQ.
