= Mel & Joey =

Philippine television talk show

- Title card
- Genre: Talk show
- Directed by: Louie Ignacio
- Presented by: Mel Tiangco; Joey de Leon
- Country of origin: Philippines
- Original language: Tagalog
- No. of episodes: 360

Production
- Executive producer: Lui Cadag
- Editors: Ronald Lansangan; Erwin Logina; Jan Vincent Chiu; Shoti Banares
- Camera setup: Multiple-camera setup
- Running time: 40–90 minutes
- Production company: GMA Entertainment TV

Original release
- Network: GMA Network
- Release: August 1, 2004 – July 17, 2011

Related
- Partners with Mel Tiangco

Mel & Joey is a Philippine television talk show broadcast by GMA Network. Directed by Louie Ignacio, it is hosted by Mel Tiangco and Joey de Leon, it premiered on August 1, 2004 on the network's Linggobingo sa Gabi line up. The show concluded on July 17, 2011, with a total of 360 episodes.

Its last studio-based episode aired on February 13, 2011. Afterwards, the show has been taped at a designated venue. The last episode was titled as "Happy Ending".

The show is streaming online on YouTube.

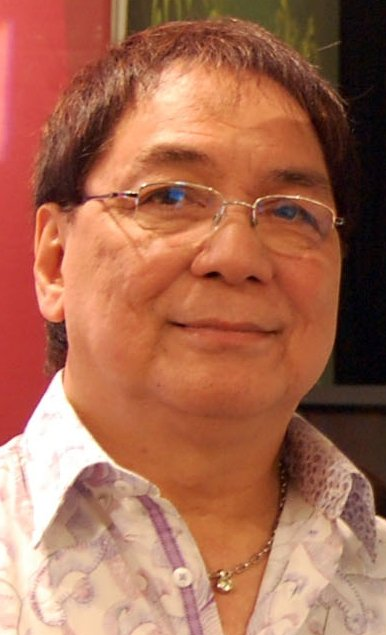
Joey de Leon serves as the host.

== Ratings ==
According to AGB Nielsen Philippines' Mega Manila household television ratings, the final episode of Mel & Joey scored an 18.9% rating.

== Accolades ==
Accolades received by Mel & Joey
Year	Award	Category	Recipient	Result	Ref.
2005	Catholic Mass Media Awards	Best Celebrity Talk Show	Mel & Joey	Won	
2005	Golden Screen TV Awards	Outstanding Celebrity Talk Show	Mel & Joey	Nominated	
2005	Golden Screen TV Awards	Outstanding Celebrity Talk Show Host	Joey de Leon	Nominated	
2005	Golden Screen TV Awards	Outstanding Celebrity Talk Show Host	Mel Tiangco	Nominated	
2007	21st PMPC Star Awards for Television	Best Magazine Show	Mel & Joey	Nominated	
2007	21st PMPC Star Awards for Television	Best Magazine Show Host	Joey de Leon Mel Tiangco	Nominated	
2008	Catholic Mass Media Awards	Best Talk Show	Mel & Joey	Won	
2008	22nd PMPC Star Awards for Television	Best Magazine Show	Mel & Joey	Nominated	
2008	22nd PMPC Star Awards for Television	Best Magazine Show Host	Joey de Leon Mel Tiangco	Nominated	
2009	23rd PMPC Star Awards for Television	Best Magazine Show	Mel & Joey	Nominated	
2009	23rd PMPC Star Awards for Television	Best Magazine Show Host	Joey de Leon Mel Tiangco	Nominated	
2010	24th PMPC Star Awards for Television	Best Magazine Show	Mel & Joey	Nominated	
2010	24th PMPC Star Awards for Television	Best Magazine Show Host	Joey de Leon Mel Tiangco	Nominated	
2010	USTv Students' Choice Awards	Best Talk Show	Mel & Joey	Won	
2010	UP Gandingan Awards	Best Talk Variety Program	Mel & Joey	Won	
2011	Catholic Mass Media Awards	Best Talk Show	Mel & Joey	Won	
2012	26th PMPC Star Awards for Television	Best Male Showbiz Oriented/Celebrity Talk Show Host	Joey de Leon	Nominated	
