= Frontpage: Ulat ni Mel Tiangco =

Philippine television news show

- Title card from June 30, 2003 to March 12, 2004
- Genre: News broadcasting
- Directed by: Joel San Luis
- Presented by: Mel Tiangco
- Country of origin: Philippines
- Original language: Tagalog

Production
- Executive producers: Antonio Magsumbol; Queenie Dimapawi
- Production locations: Studio 2, GMA Network Center, Quezon City, Philippines
- Camera setup: Multiple-camera setup
- Running time: 15–60 minutes
- Production company: GMA News and Public Affairs

Original release
- Network: GMA Network
- Release: August 16, 1999 – March 12, 2004

Frontpage: Ulat ni Mel Tiangco (transl. frontpage: report by Mel Tiangco) is a Philippine television news broadcasting show broadcast by GMA Network. Anchored by Mel Tiangco, it premiered on August 16, 1999, on the network's evening line up. The show concluded on March 12, 2004.

== Overview ==
Frontpage: Ulat ni Mel Tiangco premiered on August 16, 1999, replacing the weekday edition of GMA Network News. The newscast delivered local and international news, including politics and entertainment.

Broadcasting in the GMA EDSA TV Complex studio using green screen technology, news delivery in stand-up, and runs for 45 minutes. It received numerous awards from PMPC Star Awards for TV and Catholic Mass Media Award's Best News Program Award. Mel Tiangco was also chosen by the PMPC Star Awards for Television as their choice for Best Female Newscaster. She was also notable for philosophy works of GMA Foundation thru Bisig-Bayan. Several substitute anchors were Arnold Clavio, Daniel Razon and Rhea Santos. It introduced its new segments such as GMA Action Force by Candice Giron and Good News. Rhea Santos was chosen as the new segment host for GMA Action Force replacing Giron, Love Añover on Buenas Balita... And Everything which later became Kuwento Dito, Kuwento Doon, and TJ Manotoc on the newscast's new showbiz segment Starwatch; Santos, Añover, and Manotoc were hosts from Unang Hirit.

On March 12, 2004, Frontpage aired its last broadcast, to make way for the network's new early-evening newscast 24 Oras.

== Anchors ==
- Mel Tiangco
- Rhea Santos (GMA Action Force; 2003–04)
- Candice Giron (GMA Action Force; 2002–03)
- TJ Manotoc (Starwatch; 2003–04)
- Love Añover (Buenas Balita... And Everything Later Kwento Dito, Kwento Doon; 2003–04)
