= H. G. Wells bibliography =

Works by the English writer

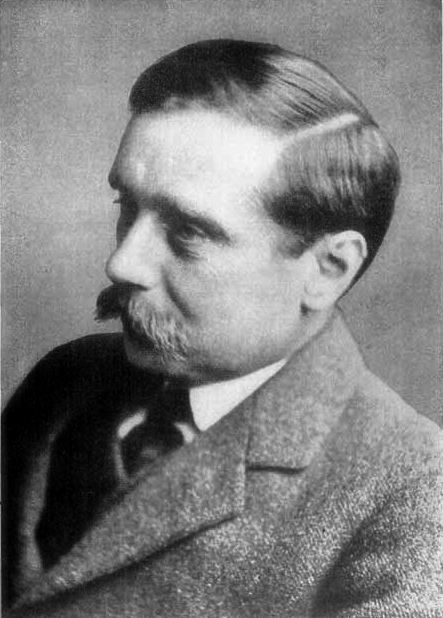
H. G. Wells (1866–1946)

H. G. Wells was a prolific writer of both fiction and non-fiction. His writing career spanned more than sixty years, and his early science fiction novels earned him the title (along with Jules Verne and Hugo Gernsback) of "The Father of Science Fiction".

== Novels ==
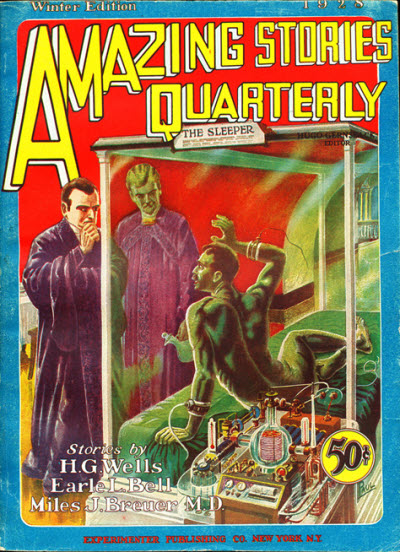
When the Sleeper Wakes was reprinted in the first issue of Amazing Stories Quarterly in early 1928, under a cover by Frank R. Paul.

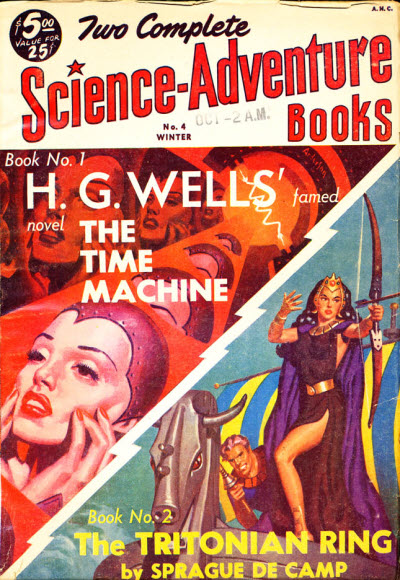
Wells's works were reprinted in American science fiction magazines as late as the 1950s.

- The Time Machine (1895)
- The Wonderful Visit (1895)
- The Island of Doctor Moreau (1896)
- The Wheels of Chance (1896)
- The Invisible Man (1897)
- The War of the Worlds (1898)
- When the Sleeper Wakes (1899, revised 1910)
- Love and Mr Lewisham (1900)
- The First Men in the Moon (1901)
- The Sea Lady (1902)
- The Food of the Gods and How It Came to Earth (1904)
- Kipps (1905)
- A Modern Utopia (1905)
- In the Days of the Comet (1906)
- The War in the Air (1908)
- Tono-Bungay (1909)
- Ann Veronica (1909)
- The History of Mr Polly (1910)
- The New Machiavelli (1911)
- Marriage (1912)
- The Passionate Friends (1913)
- The Wife of Sir Isaac Harman (1914)
- The World Set Free (1914)
- Bealby (1915)
- Boon (1915) (as Reginald Bliss)
- The Research Magnificent (1915)
- Mr Britling Sees It Through (1916)
- The Soul of a Bishop (1917)
- Joan and Peter (1918)
- The Undying Fire (1919)
- The Secret Places of the Heart (1922)
- Men Like Gods (1923)
- The Dream (1924)
- Christina Alberta's Father (1925)
- The World of William Clissold (1926)
- Meanwhile (1927)
- Mr. Blettsworthy on Rampole Island (1928)
- The Autocracy of Mr. Parham (1930)
- The Bulpington of Blup (1932)
- The Shape of Things to Come (1933)
- Brynhild (1937)
- Star Begotten (1937)
- Apropos of Dolores (1938)
- The Holy Terror (1939)
- Babes in the Darkling Wood (1940)
- You Can't Be Too Careful (1941)

== Short stories ==
=== All short stories ===
Note: The stories are listed in alphabetical order of title within each year, and not in order of their publication during the year.

- "A Tale of the Twentieth Century" (Science Schools Journal, no. 6, May 1887) – signed S.B. for Septimus Browne
- "A Talk with Gryllotalpa" (Science Schools Journal, no. 3, February 1887) – published under the pseudonym Septimus Browne
- "A Vision of the Past" (Science Schools Journal, no. 7, June 1887) – signed S.S. for "Sosthenes Smith"
- "The Chronic Argonauts" (a.k.a. "Chronic Argonaut", a.k.a. "The Chronic Argonaughts") (Science Schools Journal, nos. 17–19, April–June 1888), novelette – the earliest version of The Time Machine.
- "The Devotee of Art" (Science Schools Journal, nos. 24–25, Nov.–Dec. 1888)
- "Æpyornis Island" (Pall Mall Budget, 13 December 1894)
- "A Deal in Ostriches" (Pall Mall Gazette, 20 December 1894)
- "A Family Elopement" (The St. James's Gazette, 3 March 1894)
- "A Misunderstood Artist" (Pall Mall Gazette, 29 October 1894)
- "How Gabriel Became Thompson" (Truth, 26 July 1894)
- "In the Avu Observatory" (Pall Mall Budget, 9 August 1894)
- "In the Modern Vein" (a.k.a. "In the Modern Vein: An Unsympathetic Love Story", a.k.a. "A Bardlet's Romance") (Truth, 8 March 1894)
- "The Diamond Maker" (Pall Mall Budget, 16 August 1894)
- "The Flowering of the Strange Orchid" (a.k.a. "The Strange Orchid") (Pall Mall Budget, 2 August 1894)
- "The Hammerpond Park Burglary" (Pall Mall Budget, 5 July 1894)
- "The Jilting of Jane" (Pall Mall Budget, 12 July 1894)
- "The Lord of the Dynamos" (Pall Mall Budget, 6 September 1894)
- "The Man With a Nose" (Pall Mall Gazette, 6 Feb. 1894)
- "The Stolen Bacillus" (Pall Mall Budget, 21 June 1894)
- "The Thing in No. 7" (Pall Mall Budget, 25 October 1894)
- "The Thumbmark" (Pall Mall Budget, 28 June 1894)
- "The Treasure in the Forest" (Pall Mall Budget, 23 August 1894)
- "The Triumphs of a Taxidermist" (Pall Mall Gazette, 3–15 March 1894)
- "Through a Window" (a.k.a. "At a Window") (Black and White, 25 August 1894)
- "A Catastrophe" (New Budget, 4 April 1895)
- "How Pingwill Was Routed" (New Budget, 27 June 1895)
- "Le Mari Terrible" (New Budget, 23 May 1895)
- "Our Little Neighbour" (New Budget, 4 April 1895)
- "Pollock and the Porroh Man" (New Budget, 23 May 1895)
- "The Argonauts of the Air" (The Phil May's Annual, December 1895)
- "The Cone" (Unicorn, 18 September 1895)
- "The Flying Man" (Pall Mall Gazette, 4 January 1895)
- "The Moth" (a.k.a. "A Moth – Genus Novo") (Pall Mall Gazette, 28 March 1895)
- "The Reconciliation" (a.k.a. "The Bulla") (The Weekly Sun Literary Supplement, 1 December 1895)
- "The Remarkable Case of Davidson's Eyes" (a.k.a. "The Story of Davidson's Eyes") (Pall Mall Budget, 28 March 1895)
- "The Sad Story of a Dramatic Critic" (a.k.a. "The Obliterated Man") (New Budget, 15 August 1895)
- "The Temptation of Harringay" (The St. James's Gazette, 9 February 1895)
- "Wayde's Essence" (New Budget, 18 April 1895)
- "A Slip Under the Microscope" (The Yellow Book, January 1896)
- "In the Abyss" (Pearson's Magazine, 1 August 1896)
- "The Apple" (The Idler, October 1896)
- "The Plattner Story" (The New Review, April 1896)
- "The Purple Pileus" (Black and White, December 1896)
- "The Rajah's Treasure" (Pearson's Magazine, July 1896)
- "The Red Room" (a.k.a. "The Ghost of Fear") (The Idler, March 1896)
- "The Sea Raiders" (a.k.a. "The Sea-Raiders") (The Weekly Sun Literary Supplement, 6 December 1896)
- "The Story of the Late Mr. Elvesham" (The Idler, May 1896)
- "Under the Knife" (a.k.a. "Slip Under the Knife") (The New Review, January 1896)
- "A Perfect Gentleman on Wheels" (Woman at Home, April 1897)
- "A Story of the Stone Age" (a.k.a. "Stories of the Stone Age") (The Idler, May–September 1897), novella
- "Mr Marshall's Doppelganger" (Gentlewoman, 18 September 1897)
- "The Crystal Egg" (The New Review, May 1897)
- "The Lost Inheritance" (The Plattner Story and Others., May 1897)
- "The Presence by the Fire" (Penny Illustrated Paper, 14 August 1897)
- "The Star" (The Graphic, December 1897)
- "Jimmy Goggles the God" (The Graphic, December 1898)
- "Miss Winchelsea's Heart" (The Queen, October 1898)
- "Mr. Ledbetter's Vacation" (a.k.a. "Mr Ledbetter's Vacation") (The Strand Magazine, October 1898)
- "The Man Who Could Work Miracles" (a.k.a. "The Man Who Could Work Miracles: A Pantoum in Prose", a.k.a. "Man Who Could Work Miracles") (Illustrated London News, July 1898)
- "The Stolen Body" (The Strand Magazine, November 1898)

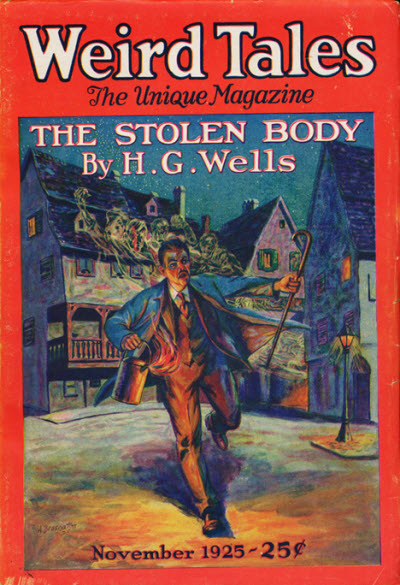
"The Stolen Body" was reprinted in Weird Tales in November 1925.

- "Walcote" (Science Schools Journal, nos. 25–26, Dec. 1898 – Jan. 1899)
- "A Story of the Days to Come" (Pall Mall Magazine, June–October 1899), novella
- "A Vision of Judgment" (a.k.a. "A Vision of Judgement") (The Butterfly, September 1899)
- "Mr. Brisher's Treasure" (a.k.a. "Mr Brisher's Treasure") (The Strand Magazine, April 1899)
- "A Dream of Armageddon" (Black and White Budget, 25 May 1901)
- "Filmer" (The Graphic, December 1901)
- "The New Accelerator" (The Strand Magazine, December 1901)
- "The Inexperienced Ghost" (a.k.a. "The Story of the Inexperienced Ghost") (The Strand Magazine, March 1902)
- "The Loyalty of Esau Common" (The Contemporary Review, February 1902)
- "Mr. Skelmersdale in Fairyland" (a.k.a. "Mr Skelmersdale in Fairyland") (London Magazine, February 1903)
- "The Land Ironclads" (The Strand Magazine, December 1903), novelette
- "The Magic Shop" (The Strand Magazine, June 1903)
- "The Truth About Pyecraft" (The Strand Magazine, April 1903)
- "The Valley of Spiders" (The Strand Magazine, March 1903)
- "The Country of the Blind" (The Strand Magazine, April 1904; revised, 1939), novelette
- "The Empire of the Ants" (a.k.a. "Empire of the Ants") (The Strand Magazine, December 1905)
- "The Door in the Wall" (1906)
- "The Beautiful Suit" (a.k.a. "A Moonlight Fable") (Collier's Weekly, April 1909)
- "Little Mother Up the Mörderberg" (The Strand Magazine, April 1910), Little Mother series #2
- "My First Aeroplane" (The Strand Magazine, January 1910), Little Mother series #1
- "The Story of the Last Trump" (Boon, 1915)
- "The Wild Asses of the Devil" (Boon, 1915)
- "Master Anthony and the Zeppelin" (children's literature, 1916)
- "The Grisly Folk" (Storyteller Magazine, April 1921), essay
- "Into the Abyss" (1923)
- "The Pearl of Love" (The Strand Magazine, January 1925)
- "The Adventures of Tommy" (children's literature, 1928)
- "A Woman's Heart" (1931)
- "The Queer Story of Brownlow's Newspaper" (The Strand Magazine, February 1932)
- "The Croquet Player" (1936), novella
- "Answer to Prayer" (The New Statesman, 10 April 1937)
- "The Camford Visitation" (chapbook, 1937), novella
- "The Brothers" (1938), novella
- "All Aboard for Ararat" (1940), novella
- "The Desert Daisy" (children's literature, 1957, published posthumously)
- "The Haunted Ceiling" (2016, published posthumously)

=== Collections ===
First edition cover of The Stolen Bacillus and Other Incidents (1895)

- Select Conversations with an Uncle (Now Extinct) and Two Other Reminiscences (1895), collection of 14 newspaper articles:
  "Of Conversation and The Anatomy of Fashion", "The Theory of The Perpetual Discomfort of Humanity", "The Use of Ideals", "The Art of Being Photographed", "Bagshot's Mural Decorations", "On Social Music", "The Joys of Being Engaged", "La Belle Dame Sans Merci", "On a Tricycle", "An Unsuspected Masterpiece", "The Great Change", "The Pains of Marriage", "A Misunderstood Artist", "The Man with a Nose"
- The Stolen Bacillus and Other Incidents (1895), collection of 15 short stories:
  "The Stolen Bacillus", "The Flowering of the Strange Orchid", "In the Avu Observatory", "The Triumphs of a Taxidermist", "A Deal in Ostriches", "Through a Window", "The Temptation of Harringay", "The Flying Man", "The Diamond Maker", "Æpyornis Island", "The Remarkable Case of Davidson's Eyes", "The Lord of the Dynamos", "The Hammerpond Park Burglary", "The Moth", "The Treasure in the Forest"
- The Plattner Story and Others (1897), collection of 17 short stories:
  "The Plattner Story", "The Argonauts of the Air", "The Story of the Late Mr. Elvesham", "In the Abyss", "The Apple", "Under the Knife", "The Sea Raiders", "Pollock and the Porroh Man", "The Red Room", "The Cone", "The Purple Pileus", "The Jilting of Jane", "In the Modern Vein", "A Catastrophe", "The Lost Inheritance", "The Sad Story of a Dramatic Critic", "A Slip Under the Microscope"
- Thirty Strange Stories (1897), collection of 30 short stories:
  "Æpyornis Island", "In the Abyss", "The Lord of the Dynamos", "The Moth", "The Plattner Story", "Pollock and the Porroh Man", "The Remarkable Case of Davidson's Eyes", "The Story of the Late Mr. Elvesham", "The Argonauts of the Air", "In the Avu Observatory", "The Stolen Bacillus", "The Triumphs of a Taxidermist", "The Apple", "The Red Room", "The Cone", "The Purple Pileus", "The Jilting of Jane", "A Catastrophe", "The Lost Inheritance", "The Sad Story of a Dramatic Critic", "A Slip Under the Microscope", "The Treasure in the Forest", "A Deal in Ostriches", "The Sea-Raiders", "In the Modern Vein: An Unsympathetic Love Story", "The Reconciliation", "Le Mari Terrible", "The Rajah's Treasure", "The Strange Orchid", "Slip Under the Knife"
- Tales of Space and Time (1899), collection of 3 short stories and 2 novellas:
  "The Crystal Egg", "The Star", "A Story of the Stone Age" (novella), "A Story of the Days to Come" (novella), "The Man Who Could Work Miracles"
- Twelve Stories and a Dream (1903), collection of 13 short stories:
  "Filmer", "The Magic Shop", "The Valley of Spiders", "The Truth About Pyecraft", "Mr. Skelmersdale in Fairyland", "The Inexperienced Ghost", "Jimmy Goggles the God", "The New Accelerator", "Mr. Ledbetter's Vacation", "The Stolen Body", "Mr. Brisher's Treasure", "Miss Winchelsea's Heart", "A Dream of Armageddon"
- The Country of the Blind and Other Stories, or The Country of the Blind, and Other Stories (1911), collection of 32 short stories and 1 novelette:
  "The Jilting of Jane", "The Cone", "The Stolen Bacillus", "The Flowering of the Strange Orchid", "In the Avu Observatory", "Æpyornis Island", "The Remarkable Case of Davidson's Eyes", "The Lord of the Dynamos", "The Moth", "The Treasure in the Forest", "The Story of the Late Mr. Elvesham", "Under the Knife", "The Sea Raiders", "The Obliterated Man", "The Plattner Story", "The Red Room", "The Purple Pileus", "A Slip Under the Microscope", "The Crystal Egg", "The Star", "The Man Who Could Work Miracles", "A Vision of Judgment", "Jimmy Goggles the God", "Miss Winchelsea's Heart", "A Dream of Armageddon", "The Valley of Spiders", "The New Accelerator", "The Truth About Pyecraft", "The Magic Shop", "The Empire of the Ants", "The Door in the Wall", "The Country of the Blind" (novelette), "The Beautiful Suit"
- The Door in the Wall and Other Stories (1911), collection of 7 short stories and 1 novelette:
  "The Door in the Wall", "The Star", "A Dream of Armageddon", "The Cone", "A Moonlight Fable", "The Diamond Maker", "The Lord of the Dynamos", "The Country of the Blind" (novelette)
- Tales of the Unexpected (1922), collection of 15 short stories:
  "The Remarkable Case of Davidson's Eyes", "The Moth", "The Story of the Late Mr. Elvesham", "Under the Knife", "The Plattner Story", "The Crystal Egg", "The Man Who Could Work Miracles", "A Dream of Armageddon", "The New Accelerator", "The Door in the Wall", "The Apple", "The Temptation of Harringay", "Mr. Skelmersdale in Fairyland", "The Inexperienced Ghost", "The Stolen Body"
- Tales of Wonder (1923), collection of 16 short stories and 1 novelette:
  "Into the Abyss", "Pollock and the Porroh Man", "The Triumphs of a Taxidermist", "In the Avu Observatory", "The Flowering of the Strange Orchid", "Æpyornis Island", "The Sea Raiders", "The Red Room", "The Purple Pileus", "The Star", "A Vision of Judgment", "The Valley of Spiders", "The Truth of Pyecraft, "The Magic Shop", "The Empire of the Ants", "The Country of the Blind" (novelette), "The Beautiful Suit"
- The Country of the Blind (1923), collection of 2 short stories and 1 novelette:
  "The Country of the Blind" (novelette), "The Truth About Pyecraft", "The Beautiful Suit"
- Tales of Life and Adventure (1923), collection of 21 short stories:
  "The Argonauts of the Air", "In the Modern Vein: An Unsympathetic Love Story", "A Catastrophe", "The Lost Inheritance", "A Deal in Ostriches", "Through a Window", "The Flying Man", "The Diamond Maker", "The Hammerpond Park Burglary", "The Jilting of Jane", "The Cone", "The Stolen Bacillus", "The Lord of the Dynamos", "The Treasure in the Forest", "The Obliterated Man", "A Slip Under the Microscope", "Jimmy Goggles the God", "Miss Winchelsea's Heart", "Filmer", "Mr. Ledbetter's Vacation", "Mr. Brisher's Treasure"
- The Empire of the Ants and Other Stories (1925), collection of 3 short stories:
  "The Empire of the Ants", "The Remarkable Case of Davidson's Eyes", "The Cone"
- The Obliterated Man and Other Stories (1925), collection of 4 short stories:
  "The Obliterated Man", "The Plattner Story", "The Red Room", "A Vision of Judgment"
- The Stolen Bacillus and Other Stories (1925), collection of 5 short stories:
  "The Jilting of Jane", "Æpyornis Island", "In the Avu Observatory", "The Flowering of the Strange Orchid", "The Stolen Bacillus"
- The Country of the Blind and Other Stories (1926), collection of 8 short stories, 2 novelettes and 1 essay:
  "The Country of the Blind" (novelette), "The Door in the Wall", "The Beautiful Suit", "The Empire of the Ants", "The Land Ironclads" (novelette), "The Grisly Folk" (essay), "Little Mother Up the Mörderberg" (Little Mother series #2), "My First Aeroplane" (Little Mother series #1), "A Vision of Judgment", "The Story of the Last Trump", "The Pearl of Love"
- The Short Stories of H. G. Wells, or The Famous Short Stories of H. G. Wells, or The Complete Short Stories of H. G. Wells (1927), collection of 1 novel, 57 short stories, 4 novelettes/novellas and 1 essay:
  The Time Machine (novel), "The Empire of the Ants", "A Vision of Judgement", "The Land Ironclads" (novelette), "The Beautiful Suit", "The Door in the Wall", "The Pearl of Love", "The Country of the Blind" (novelette), "The Stolen Bacillus", "The Flowering of the Strange Orchid", "In the Avu Observatory", "The Triumphs of a Taxidermist", "A Deal in Ostriches", "Through a Window", "The Temptation of Harringay", "The Flying Man", "The Diamond Maker", "Æpyornis Island", "The Remarkable Case of Davidson's Eyes", "The Lord of the Dynamos", "The Hammerpond Park Burglary", "The Moth", "The Treasure in the Forest", "The Plattner Story", "The Argonauts of the Air", "The Story of the Late Mr. Elvesham", "In the Abyss", "The Apple", "Under the Knife", "The Sea-Raiders", "Pollock and the Porroh Man", "The Red Room", "The Cone", "The Purple Pileus", "The Jilting of Jane", "In the Modern Vein: An Unsympathetic Love Story", "A Catastrophe", "The Lost Inheritance", "The Sad Story of a Dramatic Critic", "A Slip Under the Microscope", "The Reconciliation", "My First Aeroplane" (Little Mother series #1), "Little Mother Up the Mörderberg" (Little Mother series #2), "The Story of the Last Trump", "The Grisly Folk" (essay), "The Crystal Egg", "The Star", "A Story of the Stone Age" (novella), "A Story of the Days to Come" (novella), "The Man Who Could Work Miracles", "Filmer", "The Magic Shop", "The Valley of Spiders", "The Truth About Pyecraft", "Mr. Skelmersdale in Fairyland", "The Inexperienced Ghost", "Jimmy Goggles the God", "The New Accelerator", "Mr. Ledbetter's Vacation", "The Stolen Body", "Mr. Brisher's Treasure", "Miss Winchelsea's Heart", "A Dream of Armageddon"
- The Treasure in the Forest and Other Stories (1929), collection
- The Valley of Spiders (1930), collection
- Selections from the Early Prose Works of H. G. Wells (1931), collection of 4 extracts from novels, 1 short story and 1 novelette:
  "The Martians Come to Earth" (extract from The War of the Worlds), "The Giant Rats" (extract from The Food of the Gods), "The Invisible Man Explains" (extract from The Invisible Man), "There and Back Again" (extract from The Time Machine), "The New Accelerator", "The Land Ironclads" (novelette)
- The Man Who Could Work Miracles (1931), collection of 3 short stories:
  "The Man Who Could Work Miracles", "The Door in the Wall", "The Sea Raiders"
- The Stolen Body and Other Tales of the Unexpected (1931), collection of 13 short stories:
  "The Stolen Body", "The Remarkable Case of Davidson's Eyes", "The Moth", "The Story of the Late Mr. Elvesham", "Under the Knife", "The Plattner Story", "The Crystal Egg", "The Man Who Could Work Miracles", "A Dream of Armageddon", "The New Accelerator", "The Door in the Wall", "The Apple", "The Inexperienced Ghost"
- The Treasure in the Forest and Other Stories (1931), collection of 3 short stories:
  "The Treasure in the Forest", "The Late Mr. Elvesham", "Under the Knife"
- A Slip Under the Microscope (1931), collection of 2 short stories:
  "The Crystal Egg", "A Slip Under the Microscope"
- A Woman's Heart and Other Stories (1931), collection of 2 short stories:
  "A Woman's Heart", "A Dream of Armageddon"
- The Valley of Spiders and Other Stories (1931), collection of 3 short stories:
  "The Valley of Spiders", "The New Accelerator", "The Moth"
- The Favorite Short Stories of H. G. Wells (1937), collection of 1 novel, 28 short stories and 2 novelettes (the first 31 pieces/437 pages of the 63 pieces/1015 pages in The Short / Famous Short / Complete Short Stories of H. G. Wells (1927) above:
  The Time Machine (novel), "The Empire of the Ants", "A Vision of Judgement", "The Land Ironclads" (novelette), "The Beautiful Suit", "The Door in the Wall", "The Pearl of Love", "The Country of the Blind" (novelette), "The Stolen Bacillus", "The Flowering of the Strange Orchid", "In the Avu Observatory", "The Triumphs of a Taxidermist", "A Deal in Ostriches", "Through a Window", "The Temptation of Harringay", "The Flying Man", "The Diamond Maker", "Æpyornis Island", "The Remarkable Case of Davidson's Eyes", "The Lord of the Dynamos", "The Hammerpond Park Burglary", "The Moth", "The Treasure in the Forest", "The Plattner Story", "The Argonauts of the Air", "The Story of the Late Mr. Elvesham", "In the Abyss", "The Apple", "Under the Knife", "The Sea-Raiders", "Pollock and the Porroh Man"
- Short Stories: First Series (1940), collection of 13 short stories:
  "The Truth About Pyecraft", "The Man Who Could Work Miracles", "The Star", "The New Accelerator", "The Story of the Late Mr. Elvesham", "The Door in the Wall", "The Magic Shop", "The Plattner Story", "The Flowering of the Strange Orchid", "The Red Room", "The Temptation of Harringay", "The Inexperienced Ghost", "The Beautiful Suit"
- Short Stories: Second Series (1940), collection
- Two Film Stories: Things to Come / The Man Who Could Work Miracles (1940), collection of 1 screenplay from novel and 1 short story:
  Things to Come (screenplay from The Shape of Things to Come), "Man Who Could Work Miracles"
- The Truth About Pyecraft and Other Short Stories (1943), collection
- The Man Who Could Work Miracles (1943), collection of 3 short stories:
  "The Man Who Could Work Miracles", "The Hammerpond Park Burglary", "The Apple"
- The Truth About Pyecraft and Other Stories (1944), collection
- The Time Machine: An Invention and Other Stories (1946), collection of 1 novel and 14 short stories:
  The Time Machine (novel), "The Stolen Bacillus", "A Deal in Ostriches", "Through a Window", "The Flying Man", "The Diamond Maker", "The Lord of the Dynamos", "The Hammerpond Park Burglary", "The Argonauts of the Air", "The Cone", "A Catastrophe", "A Slip Under the Microscope", "Filmer", "Jimmy Goggles the God", "The Man Who Could Work Miracles: A Pantoum in Prose"
- The Country of the Blind and Other Stories (1947), collection of 3 short stories and 1 novelette:
  "The Country of the Blind" (novelette), "The Door in the Wall", "The Truth About Pyecraft", "A Deal in Ostriches"
- 28 Science Fiction Stories of H. G. Wells (1952), collection of 2 novels, 22 short stories and 4 novelettes/novellas:
  Men Like Gods (novel), "The Empire of the Ants", "The Land Ironclads" (novelette), "The Country of the Blind" (novelette), "The Stolen Bacillus", "The Flowering of the Strange Orchid", "In the Avu Observatory", "A Story of the Stone Age" (novella), "Æpyornis Island", "The Remarkable Case of Davidson's Eyes", "The Plattner Story", "The Argonauts of the Air", "The Story of the Late Mr. Elvesham", "In the Abyss", Star Begotten (novel), "Under the Knife", "The Sea Raiders", "The Crystal Egg", "The Star", "The Man Who Could Work Miracles", "Filmer", "A Story of the Days to Come" (novella), "The Magic Shop", "The Valley of Spiders", "The Truth About Pyecraft", "The New Accelerator", "The Stolen Body", "A Dream of Armageddon"
- Seven Stories (1953), collection of 7 short stories:
  "The Door in the Wall", "The Moth", "The Apple", "The Purple Pileus", "The New Accelerator", "The Inexperienced Ghost", "The Man Who Could Work Miracles"
- Two Tales (1956), collection of 2 short stories:
  "The Truth About Pyecraft", "The Man Who Could Work Miracles"
- Selected Short Stories (1958), collection of 1 novel, 17 short stories, 2 novelettes and 1 essay:
  The Time Machine (novel), "The Land Ironclads" (novelette), "The Door in the Wall", "The Country of the Blind" (novelette), "The Stolen Bacillus", "The Diamond Maker", "Aepyornis Island", "The Remarkable Case of Davidson's Eyes", "The Lord of the Dynamos", "The Plattner Story", "The Argonauts of the Air", "In the Abyss", "Under the Knife", "The Sea Raiders", "The Cone", "The Purple Pileus", "The Grisly Folk" (essay), "The Man Who Could Work Miracles", "The Truth About Pyecraft", "Jimmy Goggles the God", "The New Accelerator"
- Best Stories of H. G. Wells (1960), collection of 14 short stories and 2 novelettes/novellas:
  "The Lord of the Dynamos", "The Plattner Story", "The Argonauts of the Air", "The Story of the Late Mr. Elvesham", "The Crystal Egg", "The Star", "The Man Who Could Work Miracles", "The Sea-Raiders", "The Magic Shop", "The Valley of Spiders", "The Truth About Pyecraft", "The Land Ironclads" (novelette), "Mr. Skelmersdale in Fairyland", "The New Accelerator", "A Dream of Armageddon", "A Story of the Days to Come" (novella)
- The Time Machine and Other Stories (1963), collection of 1 novel, 2 short stories and 1 novelette:
  The Time Machine (novel), "The Empire of the Ants", "The Country of the Blind" (novelette), "The Man Who Could Work Miracles"
- The Valley of Spiders (1964), collection of 13 short stories:
  "Pollock and the Porroh Man", "In the Avu Observatory", "The Flowering of the Strange Orchid", "The Red Room", "The Valley of Spiders", "The Empire of the Ants", "The Moth", "The Story of the Late Mr. Elvesham", "The Temptation of Harringay", "The Inexperienced Ghost", "The Stolen Body", "The Crystal Egg", "The Door in the Wall"
- The Cone (1965), collection of 12 short stories:
  "The Cone", "Jimmy Goggles the God", "The Beautiful Suit", "Under the Knife", "The Lord of the Dynamos", "Through a Window", "The Star", "A Dream of Armageddon", "The Treasure in the Forest", "The Apple", "Æpyornis Island", "Mr. Skelmersdale in Fairyland"
- The Inexperienced Ghost and Nine Other Stories (1965), collection of 9 short stories and 1 novelette:
  "The Inexperienced Ghost", "The Magic Shop", "The Country of the Blind" (novelette), "The Apple", "The Stolen Body", "A Slip Under the Microscope", "The Purple Pileus", "Pollock and the Porroh Man", "The Man Who Could Work Miracles", "The Flowering of the Strange Orchid"
- Best Science Fiction Stories of H. G. Wells, or The Best Science Fiction Stories of H. G. Wells (1966), collection of 1 novel and 17 short stories:
  "Æpyornis Island", "The Crystal Egg", "In the Abyss", "The Lord of the Dynamos", "The Man Who Could Work Miracles", "The New Accelerator", "The Plattner Story", "The Remarkable Case of Davidson's Eyes", "The Star", "A Dream of Armageddon", "Filmer", "In the Avu Observatory", "The Diamond Maker", "The Apple", "The Purple Pileus", "The Sea-Raiders", "The Strange Orchid", The Invisible Man (novel)
- Early Writings in Science and Science Fiction (1975), collection of 1 novel, 1 extract from novel, 2 short stories and 24 essays:
  "A Talk with Gryllotalpa", "The Rediscovery of the Unique" (essay), "Flat Earth Again" (essay), "The Limits of Individual Plasticity" (essay), "On Comparative Theology" (essay), The Time Machine (novel), "The Time Machine" (extract from The Time Machine), "The "Cyclic" Delusion" (essay), "The Visibility of Change in the Moon" (essay), "The Possible Individuality of Atoms" (essay), "The Biological Problem of To-day" (essay), "The Rate of Change in Species" (essay), "The Duration of Life" (essay), "Death" (essay), "Concerning Skeletons" (essay), "Another Basis for Life" (essay), "A Vision of the Past", "Zoological Retrogression" (essay), "On Extinction" (essay), "Life in the Abyss" (essay), "Intelligence on Mars" (essay), "Ancient Experiments in Co-Operation" (essay), "Province of Pain" (essay), "The Sun God and the Holy Stars" (essay), "Bye-Products in Evolution" (essay), "Bio-Optimism" (essay), "Human Evolution, an Artificial Process" (essay), "Morals and Civilisation" (essay)
- The Time Machine (1975), collection of 1 novel and 1 short story:
  The Time Machine (novel), "The Man Who Could Work Miracles"
- Empire of the Ants and 8 Other Science Fiction Stories (1977), collection of 9 short stories:
  "The Crystal Egg", "The Man Who Could Work Miracles", "The Plattner Story", "A Dream of Armageddon", "Aepyornis Island", "In the Abyss", "The Sea Raiders", "Filmer", "Empire of the Ants"
- The Empire of the Ants (and Other Stories) (1977), collection of 4 short stories and 1 novelette:
  "The Empire of the Ants", "The Country of the Blind" (novelette), "The Crystal Egg", "The Man Who Could Work Miracles", "The Magic Shop"
- The Man with the Nose and Other Uncollected Stories of H. G. Wells (1984), collection
- The Country of the Blind and Other Science-Fiction Stories (1997), collection of 5 short stories and 1 novelette:
  "The Country of the Blind" (revised novelette), "The Star", "The New Accelerator", "The Remarkable Case of Davidson's Eyes", "Under the Knife", "The Queer Story of Brownlow's Newspaper"
- The Inexperienced Ghost (1998), collection of 2 short stories:
  "The Inexperienced Ghost", "The Temptation of Harringay"
- The Red Room and Other Stories (1998), collection
- Selected Stories of H. G. Wells (2004), collection of 24 short stories and 2 novelettes:
  "A Slip Under the Microscope", "The Remarkable Case of Davidson's Eyes", "The Plattner Story", "Under the Knife", "The Crystal Egg", "The New Accelerator", "The Stolen Body", "The Argonauts of the Air", "In the Abyss", "The Star", "The Land Ironclads" (novelette), "A Dream of Armageddon", "The Lord of the Dynamos", "The Valley of Spiders", "The Story of the Late Mr. Elvesham", "The Man Who Could Work Miracles", "The Magic Shop", "Mr. Skelmersdale in Fairyland", "The Door in the Wall", "The Presence by the Fire", "A Vision of Judgment", "The Story of the Last Trump", "The Wild Asses of the Devil", "Answer to Prayer", "The Queer Story of Brownlow's Newspaper", "The Country of the Blind" (revised novelette)
- The Country of the Blind (2005), collection of 2 short stories and 1 novelette:
  "The Country of the Blind" (novelette), "The Remarkable Case of Davidson's Eyes", "The Stolen Bacillus"
- The Stolen Bacillus (2005), collection
- The Man Who Could Work Miracles, or A Dream of Armageddon: The Complete Supernatural Tales (2006), collection of 30 short stories and 1 novelette:
- "The Devotee of Art", "Walcote", "The Flowering of the Strange Orchid", "The Lord of the Dynamos", "The Temptation of Harringay", "The Moth", "Pollock and the Porroh Man", "Under the Knife", "The Plattner Story", "The Red Room", "The Story of the Late Mr. Elvesham", "The Apple", "The Crystal Egg", "The Presence by the Fire", "The Man Who Could Work Miracles", "The Stolen Body", "A Vision of Judgment", "A Dream of Armageddon", "The New Accelerator", "The Inexperienced Ghost", "Mr Skelmersdale in Fairyland", "The Truth About Pyecraft", "The Magic Shop", "The Country of the Blind" (novelette), "The Door in the Wall", "The Beautiful Suit", "The Wild Asses of the Devil", "The Story of the Last Trump", "The Pearl of Love", "The Queer Story of Brownlow's Newspaper", "Answer to Prayer"
- The Country of the Blind and Other Selected Stories (2007), collection of 21 short stories and 2 novelettes/novellas:
  "The Lord of the Dynamos", "The Remarkable Case of Davidson's Eyes", "The Moth", "A Catastrophe", "The Cone", "The Argonauts of the Air", "Under the Knife", "A Slip Under the Microscope", "The Plattner Story", "The Story of the Late Mr Elvesham", "In the Abyss", "The Sea Raiders", "The Crystal Egg", "A Story of the Stone Age" (novella), "The Star", "The Man Who Could Work Miracles", "A Dream of Armageddon", "The New Accelerator", "The Truth About Pyecraft", "The Country of the Blind" (novelette), "The Empire of the Ants", "The Door in the Wall", "The Wild Asses of the Devil"
- Man Who Could Work Miracles and Things to Come (2010), collection of 1 novel and 1 short story:
  "The Man Who Could Work Miracles", Things to Come (novel)
- H. G. Wells: Tales of the Weird and Supernatural (2010), collection of 19 short stories:
  "The Man Who Could Work Miracles", "Pollock and the Porroh Man", "The Stolen Body", "The Story of the Late Mr. Elvesham", "A Dream of Armageddon", "The Magic Shop", "A Vision of Judgement", "The Door in the Wall", "The Temptation of Harringay", "The Apple", "The Red Room", "The Story of the Last Trump", "Mr. Skelmersdale in Fairyland", "Under the Knife", "The Story of the Inexperienced Ghost", "A Moth—Genus Novo", "The Wild Asses of the Devil", "The Presence by the Fire", "Mr. Marshall's Doppelganger"
- The Door in the Wall (2011), collection of 3 short stories:
  "The Door in the Wall", "The Sea Raiders", "The Moth"
- Complete Short Story Omnibus (2011), collection of 78 short stories, 5 novelettes/novellas and 1 essay:
  "The Stolen Bacillus", "The Flowering of the Strange Orchid", "In the Avu Observatory", "The Triumphs of a Taxidermist", "A Deal in Ostriches", "Through a Window", "The Temptation of Harringay", "The Flying Man", "The Diamond Maker", "Aepyornis Island", "The Remarkable Case of Davidson's Eyes", "The Lord of the Dynamos", "The Hammerpond Park Burglary", "The Moth", "The Treasure in the Forest", "The Plattner Story", "The Argonauts of the Air", "The Story of the Late Mr Elvesham", "In the Abyss", "The Apple", "Under the Knife", "The Sea Raiders" (variant of The Sea-Raiders), "Pollock and the Porroh Man", "The Red Room", "The Cone", "The Purple Pileus", "The Jilting of Jane", "In the Modern Vein: An Unsympathetic Love Story", "A Catastrophe", "The Lost Inheritance", "The Sad Story of a Dramatic Critic", "A Slip Under the Microscope", "The Crystal Egg", "The Star", "A Story of the Stone Age" (novella), "A Story of the Days to Come" (novella), "The Man Who Could Work Miracles", "Filmer", "The Magic Shop", "The Valley of Spiders", "The Truth About Pyecraft", "Mr Skelmersdale in Fairyland", "The Inexperienced Ghost", "Jimmy Goggles the God", "The New Accelerator", "Mr Ledbetter's Vacation", "The Stolen Body", "Mr Brisher's Treasure", "Miss Winchelsea's Heart", "A Dream of Armageddon", "The Door in the Wall", "The Empire of the Ants", "A Vision of Judgment", "The Land Ironclads" (novelette), "The Beautiful Suit", "The Pearl of Love", "The Country of the Blind" (novelette), "The Reconciliation", "My First Aeroplane" (Little Mother series #1), "Little Mother Up the Mörderberg" (Little Mother series #2), "The Story of the Last Trump", "The Grisly Folk" (essay), "A Tale of the Twentieth Century: For Advanced Thinkers", "Walcote", "The Devotee of Art", "The Man with a Nose", "A Perfect Gentleman on Wheels", "Wayde's Essence", "A Misunderstood Artist", "Le Mari Terrible", "The Rajah's Treasure", "The Presence by the Fire", "Mr Marshall's Doppelganger", "The Thing in No. 7", "The Thumbmark", "A Family Elopement", "Our Little Neighbour", "How Gabriel Became Thompson", "How Pingwill Was Routed", "The Loyalty of Esau Common: A Fragment", "The Wild Asses of the Devil", "Answer to Prayer", "The Queer Story of Brownlow's Newspaper", "The Country of the Blind" (revised novelette)
- The War of the Worlds (2013), collection of 1 novel, 1 short story and 1 essay:
  "The Crystal Egg", The War of the Worlds (novel), "The Things that Live on Mars" (essay)
- A Slip Under the Microscope (2015), collection of 2 short stories:
  "The Door in the Wall", "A Slip Under the Microscope"
- The Crystal Egg and Other Stories (2017), collection of 30 short stories, 3 novelettes/novellas and 1 essay:
  "The Crystal Egg", "The Cone", "The Country of the Blind" (novelette), "The Man Who Could Work Miracles", "A Story of the Stone Age" (novella), "The Star", "The Red Room", "In the Abyss", "The Plattner Story", "The New Accelerator", "A Slip Under the Microscope", "The Stolen Bacillus", "The Remarkable Case of Davidson's Eyes", "The Lord of the Dynamos", "The Grisly Folk" (essay), "The Door in the Wall", "The Diamond Maker", "Under the Knife", "The Sea-Raiders", "The Purple Pileus", "The Truth About Pyecraft", "Jimmy Goggles the God", "The Flowering of the Strange Orchid", "The Argonauts of the Air", "Miss Winchelsea's Heart", "A Vision of Judgement", "The Land Ironclads" (novelette), "The Flying Man", "In the Avu Observatory", "The Triumphs of a Taxidermist", "A Deal in Ostriches", "Through a Window", "The Temptation of Harringay", "The Beautiful Suit"
- The Island of Doctor Moreau & Other Works (2017), collection
- A Novel Journal: H. G. Wells (2017), collection
- The Amazing Stories Collection (2018), collection
- H. G. Wells Short Stories (2018), collection

=== Uncollected short stories ===
- "The Chronic Argonauts" (a.k.a. "Chronic Argonaut", a.k.a. "The Chronic Argonaughts") (Science Schools Journal, nos. 17–19, April–June 1888), novelette
- "Master Anthony and the Zeppelin" (children's literature, 1916)
- "The Adventures of Tommy" (children's literature, 1928)
- "The Desert Daisy" (children's literature, 1957, published posthumously)
- "The Haunted Ceiling" (2016, published posthumously)

== Film stories ==
Published versions of film scripts and scenarios written by Wells:

- The King Who Was a King: The Book of a Film (1929 – scenario for a film which was never made)
- Things to Come (1935 – adaptation of The Shape of Things to Come and The Work, Wealth and Happiness of Mankind)
- Man Who Could Work Miracles (1936)
- The New Faust (in Nash's Pall Mall Magazine, December 1936 – unmade adaptation of "The Story of the Late Mr. Elvesham")
- Film Stories (1940 – collection of Things to Come and Man Who Could Work Miracles)

== Non-fiction ==
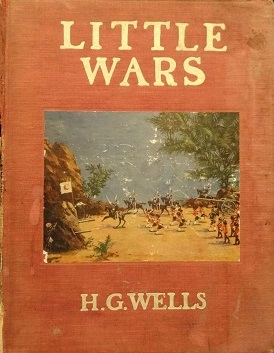
Cover of Little Wars (1913)

Collections of articles

- The War That Will End War (1914)
- An Englishman Looks at the World (1914); US title: Social Forces in England and America
- The Elements of Reconstruction (1916) – published under the pseudonym D. P.
- God the Invisible King (1917)
- Russia in the Shadows (1920)
- A Year of Prophesying (1925)
- The Way the World is Going (1928)
- The New America: The New World (1935)

Autobiographies

- Experiment in Autobiography (1934)
- H. G. Wells in Love: Postscript to An Experiment in Autobiography (1984) – edited by G. P. Wells

Biographies

- Frank Swinnerton (1920) – with Arnold Bennett, Grant Overton
- The Story of a Great Schoolmaster: Being a Plain Account of the Life and Ideas of Sanderson of Oundle (1924) – a biography of Frederick William Sanderson

Essays

- Certain Personal Matters (1897)
- The Peace of the World (1915)
- In the Fourth Year (1918)
- Washington and the Hope of Peace (a.k.a. "Washington and the Riddle of Peace") (1922)
- World Brain (1938)
- Travels of a Republican Radical in Search of Hot Water (1939)

History

- What is Coming? (1916)
- War and the Future (a.k.a. Italy, France and Britain at War) (1917)
- The Idea of a League of Nations (1919) – with Viscount Edward Grey, Lionel Curtis, William Archer, H. Wickham Steed, A. E. Zimmern, J. A. Spender, Viscount Bryce and Gilbert Murray
- The Way to the League of Nations (1919) – with Viscount Edward Grey, Lionel Curtis, William Archer, H. Wickham Steed, A. E. Zimmern, J. A. Spender, Viscount Bryce and Gilbert Murray
- The New Teaching of History: with a reply to some recent criticisms of the Outline of History (H. G. Wells) (1921)
- A Short History of the World (1922) (New and Rev Ed. 1946)
- A Short History of Mankind (1925)
- Mr. Belloc Objects to "The Outline of History" (1926)
- The Common Sense of War and Peace (1940)
- The Pocket History of the World (1941)
- Crux Ansata: An Indictment of the Roman Catholic Church (1943)

Politics

- This Misery of Boots (1907)
- Will Socialism Destroy the Home? (1907)
- New Worlds for Old (1908)
- The Great State (1912)
- The War and Socialism (1915)
- The Outline of History series:
  1. The Outline of History (1920)
  2. The Science of Life (1930) – with Julian S. Huxley and G. P. Wells
  3. The Work, Wealth and Happiness of Mankind (1931)
- The Salvaging of Civilization (1921)
- Socialism and the Scientific Motive (1923)
- Wells' Social Anticipations (1927)
- The Open Conspiracy (a.k.a. What Are We To Do With Our Lives?) (1928)
- The New Russia (1931)
- What Should be Done—Now: A Memorandum on the World Situation, John Day (1932)
- After Democracy (1932)
- Marxism vs Liberalism (1934) – with Joseph Stalin
- The New World Order (1940)
- The Rights of Man (1940)
- Guide to the New World (1941)
- Modern Russian and English Revolutionaries (1942) – with Lev Uspensky
- Phoenix: A Summary of the Inescapable Conditions of World Reorganization (1942)

Science

- Text-Book of Biology (1893)
- Honours Physiography (1893) – with R. A. Gregory
- Anticipations series:
  1. Anticipations of the Reactions of Mechanical and Scientific Progress upon Human Life and Thought (1901)
  2. Mankind in the Making (1903)

Sociology

- Great Thoughts From H. G. Wells (1912)
- Thoughts From H. G. Wells (1912)
- Divorce as I See It (1930)
- The Anatomy of Frustration (1936)
- The Fate of Homo Sapiens (a.k.a. The Fate of Man) (1939)
- The Outlook for Homo Sapiens (1942)
- The Conquest of Time (1942)
- '42 to '44: A Contemporary Memoir (1944)
- Reshaping Man's Heritage (1944) – with J. B. S. Haldane, Julian S. Huxley
- The Happy Turning (1945)
- Mind at the End of Its Tether (1945)

Others

- The Future in America (1906), travels
- First and Last Things (1908), philosophy
- Floor Games (1911), guide
- Little Wars (1913), guide
- God the Invisible King (1917), religion
- Introduction to Nocturne (1917)
- Points of View (1930)
- Selections From the Early Prose Works of H. G. Wells (1931)
- H.G. Wells: Early Writings in Science and Science Fiction (1975)

== Articles ==
- "Zoological Retrogression" (1891)
- "The Rediscovery of the Unique" (1891)
- "Ancient Experiments in Co-Operation" (1892)
- "On Extinction" (1893)
- "The Man of the Year Million" (1893)
- "The Sun God and the Holy Stars" (1894)
- "Province of Pain" (1894)
- "Life in the Abyss" (1894)
- "Another Basis for Life" (1894)
- "The Rate of Change in Species" (1894)
- "The Biological Problem of To-day" (1894)
- "The 'Cyclic' Delusion" (1894)
- "The Flat Earth Again" Pall Mall Gazette (2 April 1894)
- "Bio-Optimism" (1895)
- "Bye-Products in Evolution" (1895)
- "Death" (1895)
- "The Duration of Life" (1895)
- "The Visibility of Change in the Moon" (1895)
- "The Limits of Individual Plasticity" Saturday Review (18 January 1895) later incorporated in The Island of Dr Moreau
- "Human Evolution, an Artificial Process" (1896)
- "Intelligence on Mars" (1896)
- "Concerning Skeletons" (1896)
- "The Possible Individuality of Atoms" (1896)
- "Morals and Civilisation" (1897)
- "On Comparative Theology" (1898)
- "The Discovery of the Future" (1902)
- "The English House of the Future" (1903; several other authors)
- "Skepticism of the Instrument" (1903)
- "The So-Called Science of Sociology" (1906)
- "The Things that Live on Mars" (illustrated by William Robinson Leigh) (1908)
- "The Grisly Folk" (1921)
- "Mr. Wells and Mr. Vowles" (1926)
- "The Red Dust a Fact!" (1927)
- "Democracy Under Revision" (1927)
- "Wells Speaks Some Plain Words to us", The New York Times, 16 October 1927
- "Common Sense of World Peace" (1929)
- "Foretelling the Future" (1938)
