= The Undying Fire (Wells novel) =

Book by Herbert George Wells

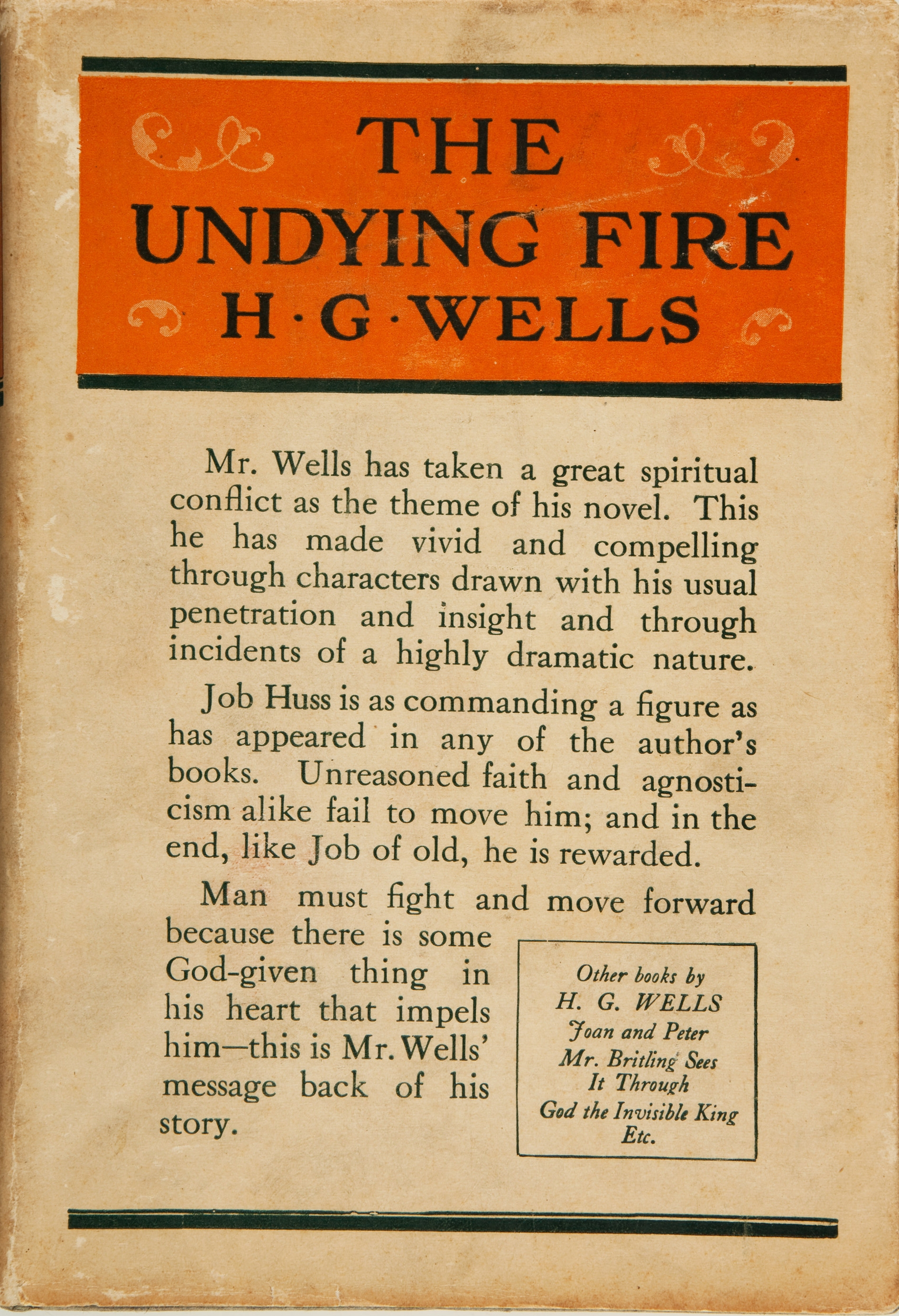
- First US edition
- Author: H. G. Wells
- Original title: The Undying Fire: A Contemporary Novel
- Language: English
- Genre: Novel
- Published: 1919
- Publisher: Cassell (UK); Macmillan (US)
- Media type: Print
- Pages: 229
- Preceded by: Joan and Peter
- Followed by: The Outline of History

The Undying Fire, a 1919 novel by H. G. Wells, is a modern retelling of the story of Job. Like the Book of Job, it consists of a prologue in heaven, an exchange of speeches with four visitors, a dialogue between the protagonist and God, and an epilogue in which the protagonist's fortunes are restored. The novel is dedicated "to All Schoolmasters and Schoolmistresses and every Teacher in the World."

== Plot summary ==
The protagonist of The Undying Fire is Job Huss, a schoolmaster who has fallen on evil days. The public school at Woldingstanton in Norfolk that he has reformed has been struck by a measles epidemic, an explosion in the chemistry lab that has killed an instructor, and a fire that has killed two students. The day after the fire Huss's solicitor has committed suicide after losing his savings in speculation on the Russian ruble. Huss has suffered a partial breakdown, but while he is recuperating in the company of his wife at the fictional seaside town of Sundering-on-Sea they have learned that their only son has been "shot down over the German lines." And he has been diagnosed with cancer.

In these dire straits, Job Huss is visited by three members of the Woldingstanton board intent on dismissing him from his headmastership: Sir Eliphaz Burrows, a manufacturer of building materials, Mr. William Dad, an automotive and aeronautical manufacturer, and Mr. Joseph Farr, the head of the technical section at Woldingstanton; their names allude to Job's visitors in the Book of Job, Eliphaz, Bildad, and Zophar. Huss resists leaving his school. Proclaiming that "the task of the teacher . . . is to ensure that Man, Man the Divine, grows in the souls of men," he engages in a series of philosophical disputations that reflect theological views Wells developed most fully in God the Invisible King (1917).

The role of Elihu is played by Huss's physician, Dr. Elihu Barrack, who sympathises with some of Huss's views but contests others. Job Huss's response to him includes an extended evocation of submarine warfare that has been called the most powerful writing in the novel.

After their disputation, Huss undergoes a surgical operation. Under anaesthesia, he converses with God and is told that "If you have courage, although the night be dark, although the present battle be bloody and cruel and end in a strange and evil fashion, nevertheless victory shall be yours. . . . Only have courage. On the courage in your heart all things depend."

== Background ==
The character of Job Huss is loosely based on Frederick William Sanderson, of whom in 1922 Wells would write a biography entitled The Story of a Great Schoolmaster.

As a paean to education, The Undying Fire anticipates the series of great textbooks on history (The Outline of History, 1920), biology (The Science of Life, 1931), and economics (The Work, Wealth and Happiness of Mankind, 1932) that Wells was about to undertake.

== Reception ==
Wells believed that The Undying Fire contained some of his best writing. While some friends agreed, reviewers and critics have been less generous. One of Wells's biographers groused that the novel is "a parade of ideas leading to a predetermined conclusion: that the one true god is the yearning for the ideal in the human heart, which can be successfully developed through education."
