= War and the Future =

1917 book by H. G. Wells

- First edition
- Author: H. G. Wells
- Original title: War and the Future: Italy, France and Britain at War
- Language: English
- Genre: Propaganda
- Publisher: Cassell & Company
- Publication date: 1917
- Publication place: UK
- Media type: Print (hardback)
- Pages: 285
- Preceded by: The Elements of Reconstruction
- Followed by: God the Invisible King

War and the Future (1917) is a work of war propaganda by H. G. Wells that was published in North America under the title Italy, France, and Britain at War (the subtitle of the British original). Wells would have preferred the title The War of Ideas, but his publisher over-ruled him. Except for the opening piece, its chapters were published as articles in the press. Though proclaiming early in the volume that "I avow myself an extreme Pacifist," Wells staunchly supported Britain's war against Germany "in the hope that so we and the world may be freed from the German will-to-power and all its humiliating and disgusting consequences henceforth for ever."

== Synopsis ==
War and the Future is divided into four parts.

In the first part, entitled "The Passing of the Effigy", Wells argues that "the great man of this war is the common man", and sketches a portrait of General Joffre as "a single figure to stand for the finest quality of the Allies' war", on account of his "leadership without vulgar ambition...He is as it were the ordinary commonsense of men, incarnate." In an account of a visit with the King of Italy, "the first king I had ever met", Wells is struck by the monarch's lack of pomp and, indeed, regality.

The second part, titled "The War in Italy" (August 1916), describes the city of Udine and the mountain warfare of the Isonzo front as well as visits to Verona, Venice, and Milan.

The third part, "The Western War" (September 1916), describes visits to the Western Front near Arras and Soissons in France. Wells expresses confidence that methods of aerial dominance, combined with photography, have permitted the Allies to develop tactics that are sure ultimately to defeat Germany. Wells praises British soldiers but criticises the officer corps for its mental rigidity. He emphasises that new technologies have transformed the art of war in ways that military professionals are all too slow to grasp. In particular, fighting in disciplined formations and cavalry are no longer of any military importance, while "[a]rtillery is now the most essential instrument of the war." Wells describes a tour of a munitions factory given by André Citroën. He devotes a chapter to tanks as "a beginning in a new phase of warfare" noting that in 1903 he had described a tank in a short story ("The Land Ironclads").

War and the Future's final part is entitled "How People Think about the War" and addresses a miscellany of subjects: (1) the failure of contemporaries to grasp the nature and causes of the war; (2) the psychology of what he calls "the Yielding Pacifist" (willing to accept any sort of peace), whose origins he finds in "the Resentful Employé," and of "the Conscientious Objector," pages he later deeply regretted; (3) the effect of the war on religious thought; (4) French and Italian doubts about the British; (5) the effect of the war on future labour relations; (6) the prospects for ending the war. On the last subject, Wells saw a possibility of victory in 1917, but allowed that "the war, universally detested, may go on into 1918 or 1919." Wells said that "America should ultimately undertake the responsibility of a world peace settlement."

== Background ==
Wells was a reluctant propagandist, as he states in the volume's early pages. Government censors attempted to excise his criticism of British military officers, but Wells ignored their excisions. He told his publisher his text had been approved, and told censors that he lost their revised proofs, though in fact he had burned them.

Wells sailed for France on 8 Aug 1916. He visited the French front at Soissons, then went to Udine via Venice. He returned to France via Verona and Milan, visiting Arras, Dompierre, Fricourt, and Albert.

== Reception ==
The articles that are the basis of War and the Future were widely read, and the volume sold well.
