= A Vision of Judgment =

"A Vision of Judgement"
- Short story by H. G. Wells
- Genre: Satire

Publication
- Published in: The Butterfly, "A humorous and artistic magazine"
- Publication type: Magazine
- Media type: Short story
- Publication date: September 1899

Written in the late 19th century by H. G. Wells and first published in The Butterfly (September 1899), and collected in The Obliterated Man and Other Stories (December 1925), "A Vision of Judgment" is a short story in 9 sections. It portrays a Last Judgment in which God and the archangel Gabriel laugh at sinners and saints alike, embarrassing them until they flee "up the sleeve of God." After every human soul has taken shelter there, all of humanity, "enlightened" and "in new clean bodies," is given a second chance. God shakes them—or rather us—"out of his sleeve upon the planet he had given us to live upon, the planet that whirled about green Sirius for a sun," saying "now that you understand me and each other a little better. . . . try again."

"A Vision of Judgment" has been reprinted in The Complete Short Stories of H. G. Wells, A Dream of Armageddon: The Complete Supernatural Tales., and various other collections and anthologies. Some of the publications were under the title "A Vision of Judgement."

== Background ==
Wells was raised by a mother—Sarah Wells née Neal (1822-1905)—with a "natural tendency to Protestant piety" and who believed "that God our Father and Saviour, personally and through occasional angels, would mind her; she believed that he would not be indifferent to her prayers; she believed she had to be good, carefully and continually, and not give Satan a chance with her. Then everything would be all right." Wells rebelled against these beliefs early on. "I was indeed a prodigy of Early Impiety. I was scared by Hell, I did not at first question the existence of Our Father, but no fear no terror could prevent my feeling that his All Seeing Eye was that of an Old Sneak and that the Atonement for which I had to be so grateful was either an imposture, a trick of sham self-immolation, or a crazy nightmare. I felt the unsoundness of these things before I dared to think." In his autobiography he writes that at the age of "eleven or twelve" "the light broke through to me and I knew this God was a lie." He wrote a satirical anti-religious poem as early as 1885. Under the stress of World War I Wells went through an extended period of what he called in his autobiography "deistic phrasing," without, however, making "any concessions to doctrinal Christianity." But "[a]fter The Undying Fire, God as a character disappears from my work, except for a brief undignified appearance, a regrettable appearance, dressed in moonshine and armed with Cupid's bow and arrows in The Secret Places of the Heart (1922). My phraseology went back unobtrusively to the sturdy atheism of my youthful days. My spirit had never left it."
