= Crux Ansata =

1943 book by H. G. Wells

- First edition cover
- Author: H. G. Wells
- Publisher: Penguin Books
- Publication date: 1943

Crux Ansata, subtitled 'An Indictment of the Roman Catholic Church', (1943) is one of the last books published by H. G. Wells (1866–1946). It is a scathing, 96-page critique of the Roman Catholic Church.

== Publication ==
Crux Ansata was published in 1943, during the Second World War, by Penguin Books, Harmondsworth (Great Britain): Penguin Special No. 129. The U.S. edition was copyrighted and published in 1944 by Agora Publishing Company, New York, with a portrait frontispiece and an appendix of an interview with Wells recorded by John Rowland. The U.S. edition of 144 pages went into a third printing in August 1946.

== Contents ==
Wells, then living in London under the regular German Luftwaffe bombings from across the English Channel, extensively attacks Pope Pius XII and calls for the bombing of the city of Rome.

The book also forms a hostile history of the Roman Catholic Church, deeply imbued with anti-clericalism. Wells, by then an atheist, had a long history of anti-Catholic writings spanning decades.

== See also ==
- Anti-Catholicism in the United Kingdom
- H. G. Wells bibliography
