= The New Accelerator =

- Short story by H. G. Wells
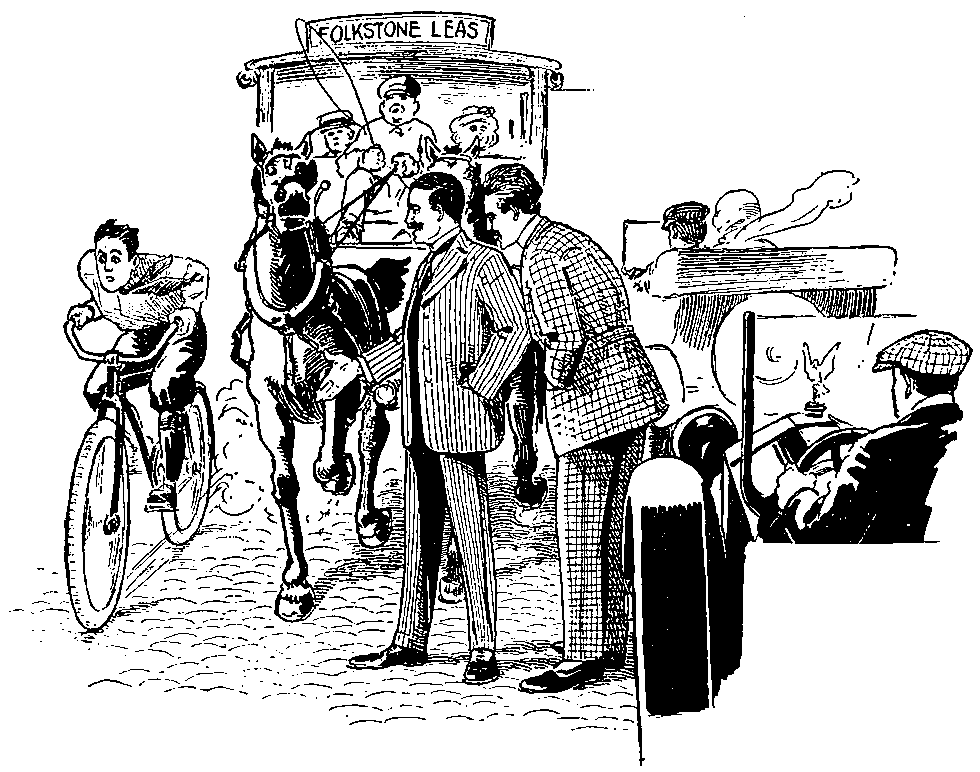
- Opening illustration for the story The New Accelerator in Amazing Stories magazine, 1926
- Country: United Kingdom
- Genre: Science fiction

Publication

"The New Accelerator" is a 1901 science fiction short story by H. G. Wells, first published in The Strand Magazine in December 1901. The story addresses an elixir, invented by Prof. Gibberne, that accelerates all of an individual's physiological and cognitive processes by some orders of magnitude, such that although the individual perceives no change in themselves, the external world appears almost frozen into immobility, and only the motion of most rapidly moving objects – such as the tip of a cracked whip – can be perceived.

The exploration of the consequences of this is incomplete; for example, the inventor and his companion find that while under the influence of the elixir they can easily singe their clothing from the heat produced by friction against the air as they walk, such is the rapidity of their motion; but this same air friction would render it impossible to breathe at a correspondingly accelerated rate, and this difficulty is ignored.

The drug has considerable advantages, as well as risks, drawing upon a trope present in other of Wells' literary works that describes the possibility of scientific discoveries to be both a blessing and a curse.

"The New Accelerator" was included in the H. G. Wells short-story collection Twelve Stories and a Dream (1903) and much later reprinted in the first edition of Amazing Stories (April 1926).

In 1966, the premise of this story was adapted as an episode of the CBS TV series The Wild, Wild West titled "The Night of the Burning Diamond" (season 1, episode 26, originally aired 8 April 1966).

In 2001 it was adapted for the first episode of the 2001 miniseries The Infinite Worlds of H. G. Wells. The French comic-series La Brigade Chimérique features, among other characters from literature and comic, Prof. Gibberne's son Andrew Gibberne.
