= All Aboard for Ararat =

1940 novella by H. G. Wells

- First edition (UK)
- Author: H. G. Wells
- Illustrator: John Farleigh (UK); George Salter (US)
- Language: English
- Publisher: Secker and Warburg (UK); Alliance Book Corporation (US)
- Publication date: 1940 (UK); 1941 (US)
- Publication place: United Kingdom
- Pages: 103

All Aboard for Ararat is a 1940 allegorical novella by H. G. Wells that tells a modernized version of the story of Noah and the Flood. Wells was 74 when it was published, and it is the last of his utopian writings.

== Plot summary ==
God Almighty pays a visit to Noah Lammock, a well-known author whom the outbreak of war has convinced that "madness had taken complete possession of the earth." At first God is thought to be a mental patient from a nearby asylum, but his dignified air earns him a reception in the writer's study. God explains that he has been "surprised" and "disappointed" by humanity, and tells Noah Lammock: "What I propose is that you should construct, with my help and under my instruction, an Ark."

Lammock is intrigued, but first, since God tells him that the Bible is "wonderfully trustworthy" and possesses "substantial truth," demands an accounting for his decision to destroy the Tower of Babel. God has already explained that the creation of light entailed as well the creation of "a shadow," and "since I had come into our Universe as a Person, it is evident that my shadow also had to be a Person." Now God explains that he and Satan panicked at the prospect of "Man keeping together on the plain of Shinar in one world state, working together, building up and up," and "together . . . acted in such haste that frankly the covenant with Noah and all that was completely overlooked." God is repentant, however, and tells Lammock that still wants to "bring Adam into free, expanding fellowship with myself -- that old original idea." Lammock takes pity, in part because he notices the deity is "quivering on the very verge of non-existence."

God returns to Noah Lammock a week later, and, after some literary chit-chat that reveals that God is under the misapprehension that Noah Lammock is the author of The Time Machine, The Work, Wealth and Happiness of Mankind, and World Brain, the two discuss the plan for the Ark. God is enthused about the potential of microphotography, having met Kenneth Mees, but Lammock demands to know: are they to "reinstate or do we start afresh?" Lammock believes it is necessary "to begin over again," because the "primary danger" to the new world is "that the élite will become a self-conscious, self-protective organisation within the State." "[I]t is a new religion and a new manner of life I am obliged to stand for." "The core of the new world must be (listen to the words!) Atheist, Creative, Psycho-synthetic," he declares, but God can come along as "an inspiring delusion."

Choosing a crew for the Ark is an enormous problem because no one Lammock knows seems to be equal to the task, but before he has resolved it he awakens to discover that he is already in the cabin of the Ark, which is "thirty days out." An excerpt from the ship's log explains that a leak has delayed its landing, and that Jonah, a stowaway, has caused no end of problems. The novella ends inconclusively ("The final pages of this story do not appear to be forthcoming") with a further conversation between God and Noah Lammock. They agree that they "will make Ararat," and God says, "On the whole, I am not sorry I created you." As for Noah, he declares: "No man is beaten until he knows and admits he is beaten, and that I will never know nor admit."

== Reception ==
Wells made a lecture tour in the United States in October and November 1940, and tried to arrange for the publication of All Aboard for Ararat to coincide with his tour.

All Aboard for Ararat was praised by Graham Greene.
