= Mankind in the Making =

1903 work by H.G. Wells

- Author: H. G. Wells
- Language: English
- Genre: Sociology
- Publisher: Chapman & Hall (U.K.) & Charles Scribner's Sons (U.S.)
- Publication date: September 1903
- Publication place: UK
- Pages: ix + 429
- Text: Mankind in the Making at Wikisource

Mankind in the Making (1903) is H.G. Wells's sequel to Anticipations (1901). Mankind in the Making analyzes the "process" of "man's making," i.e. "the great complex of circumstances which mould the vague possibilities of the average child into the reality of the citizen of the modern state." Taking an aggressive tone in criticizing many aspects of contemporary institutions, Wells proposed a doctrine he called "New Republicanism," which "tests all things by their effect upon the evolution of man."

The volume consists of eleven "papers" that were first published in the British Fortnightly Review from September 1902 to September 1903 and in the American Cosmopolitan, and an appendix. It was reprinted by Chapman and Hall in 1906 in a cheaper edition, and again in 1914, on the eve of World War I.

== Synopsis ==
=== Preface ===
Wells proposes to "provide the first tentatives of a political doctrine that shall be equally available for application in the British Empire and the United States." He notes an "especial indebtedness to my friend, Mr. Graham Wallas."

=== Chapter 1: The New Republic ===
Renouncing any claim to an "absolute truth" on the ethical, social, and political questions addressed in this volume, Wells says his views are "designed first for those who are predisposed for their reception." He proposes as a "general principle" a doctrine he dubs "New Republicanism," based on a view of life as "a tissue and succession of births." Only in the 19th century, with the idea of organic evolution, has such a view become "definite and pervading," "alter[ing] the perspective of every human affair" and enabling a criterion of judgment based on "wholesome and hopeful births." No existing political party is based on such a view. New Republicanism, then, exists "to get better births and a better result from the births we get."

=== Chapter 2: The Problem of the Birth Supply ===
Because of "an absolute want of knowledge" in the domain of the "missing science of heredity," Wells rejects the notion, advanced by followers of Francis Galton like Max Nordau, that the state should try to breed human beings selectively: "we are, as a matter of fact, not a bit clear what points to breed for and what points to breed out." He argues that such supposed positive traits as beauty, health, capacity, genius (Wells does not refer to "intelligence"), as well as such supposed negative traits as criminality and alcoholism, are in fact such complex entanglements of characteristics that "ignorance and doubt bar our way." Transmission of specific diseases may be an exception. Research in this area is in urgent need of support. At the level of individual action, however, New Republicans are to "use our judgments to the utmost to do each what seems to him probably right." Laws that "foster and protect the cowardly and the mean" or "guard stupidity" should be altered.

=== Chapter 3: Certain Wholesale Aspects of Man-Making ===
As for the upbringing of children, any notion of "Nature's trustworthiness" is rejected out of hand: "The very existence and nature of man is an interference with Nature and Nature's ways." A child needs (i) "exclusively to itself" the "constant loving attention" of "a mother or ... some well-affected girl or woman" who is in good health; (ii) warmth; (iii) shelter; (iv) cleanliness; (v) bright lights; (vi) good food; (vii) intelligent and articulate caretaking; (viii) access to skilled medical care. Wells doubts whether more than a quarter of the children born in England grow up in such conditions. He cites statistics from Clifford Allbutt's System of Medicine demonstrating class differences, and infant mortality statistics suggesting "a holocaust of children" is occurring in industrial areas like Lancashire.

Rejecting an approach to the problem via philanthropic homes because these encourage "inferior people" to have children and in any case "do not work," Wells argues that public policy ought to "discourage reckless parentage" but not lighten at all the burden of parental responsibility. He proposes that the state determine standards for the care of children, and when parents are unable to meet the standards they should be "charged with the cost of a suitable maintenance." This will discourage "inferior people" from reproducing. Also conducive to this end is a minimum wage set to allow for a life that is "wholesome, healthy. . . by the standards of comfort at the time." Industries incapable of sustaining such a wage are only "a disease and a parasite upon the public body." People unemployable at this minimum wage are "people of the Abyss" who will thus be "swept out of [their] rookeries and hiding-places." In this dispensation, "[t]hey would exist, but they would not multiply—and that is our supreme end."

=== Chapter 4: The Beginning of the Mind and Language ===
Wells views a child at birth as "at first no more than an animal," but during the first year "a mind, a will, a personality, the beginning of all that is real and spiritual in man" "creeps in" in the course of a "process" that is "unanalyzable." What the child needs for development is "a succession of interesting things," and poor children are "least at a disadvantage" during this phase. The "almost constant presence of the mother" is ideal, and is, indeed, the reason for monogamy's "practical sanction." Simple toys that can be variously manipulated are best.

"With speech humanity begins." Wells, following Froebel, emphasizes the child's need to hear clear consistent speech, and disapproves of baby talk and of nurses speaking foreign tongues. Wells notes that "only a very small minority of English or American people have more than half mastered" English, and expostulates on the unnecessary impoverishment of English speech that is maintained as a social norm. "Saving" English is necessary "if we wish to save the future of the world." Wells advocates promoting throughout the world "one accent, one idiom, and one intonation" of English. Better materials for the teaching of language need to be developed by an "English Language Society" made up of "affluent and vigorous people." Wells also makes practical pedagogical suggestions, like advocating paraphrasing to teach writing.

Wells gives practical suggestions for the teaching of shapes and numbers; he is a great advocate of wooden blocks. He sketches the state of a child's imaginative world "at or about the fifth year," when "formal education. . . ought to begin."

=== Chapter 5: The Man-Making Forces of the Modern State ===
A key factor in human development is the home, understood broadly as the circle of people with whom the child is in "constant, close contact." The impression of home life on the child is nearly indelible, and derives principally from

- tradition
- "economic necessities"
- "the influx of new systems of thought, of feeling, and of interpretation about the general issues of life."

In Great Britain there are three main traditions: "the aristocratic, the middle, and the labour class." But "new necessities" are remoulding them. — Schools should cultivate the habit of industry, but moral, religious, aesthetic, and philosophical instruction they are ill-equipped to give, much less the impetus to Great Britain's much needed renewal of "national energy," for the average man derives his "moral code" chiefly from his "school-fellows," not from school.

=== Chapter 6: Schooling ===
Class instruction and learning to read and write constitute the initial stage of schooling; they mark "a stage in the civilizing process." "When tribes coalesce into nations, schools appear." Counting, and a second "culture tongue" as a key to a higher culture, are also general, though the latter is being superseded in France, Germany, Great Britain, and the United States. Wells emphasizes the tendency to introduce into the curriculum elements "irrelevant to schooling proper"; these are justifiable only if they serve "to widen the range of intercourse." Wells proposes an apparently modest but really quite ambitious curriculum. It demands a thorough overhaul of how English composition is taught, and, except for physics and some rudiments of the concepts of chemistry, regards most instruction in facts of science, history, etc., as superfluous; these are relegated to the school library and the initiative of the student. Wells also emphasizes the importance of giving children enough time for free play, which he defines as "a spontaneous employment into which imagination enters," and privacy.

=== Chapter 7: Political and Social Influences ===
As for politics and society, New Republicanism takes the position that any institution that does not "mould men into fine and vigorous forms" must "be destroyed." Such an institution is the British monarchy, a "stupendous sham." Wells argues, referring to Ch. 3 of his earlier Anticipations (1901), that "in a sense, the British system, the pyramid of King, land-owning and land-ruling aristocracy, yeoman and trading middle-class and labourers, is dead—it died in the nineteenth century under wheels of mechanism." But an extended comparison shows that American conditions do not offer a desirable alternative. As a "crude suggestion," Wells ponders the possibility of election of public officials by juries. As for honors, Wells proposes the development of a "generally non-hereditary functional nobility." The new methods could later be extended to the control of property, for " 'We are all Socialists nowadays,' " in addition to the further development of taxing property transfers.

=== Chapter 8: The Cultivation of the Imagination ===
Adolescence and the awakening of sexual interest signify that "the race, the species, is claiming the individual" and indeed is "the source of all our power in life." Apart from the affirmation of the importance of motherhood and the necessity of taboos, Wells admits: "I have no System—I wish I had," no "doctrine of sexual conduct." Not rules, but wisdom for oneself and patience for others are needed. One of the functions of literature is to record "experiments in the science of this central field of human action."

"[W]e are all too careless of the quality of the stuff that reaches the eyes and ears of our children." Wells endorses censorship: "I am on the side of the Puritans here, unhesitatingly." Wells proposes that a category of "adult" art, literature, and science be recognized, and that "a high minimum price" be set for it, since few children can spend much. Alternately, an age limit could be set; Wells proposes eighteen. "[W]hat is here proposed is not so much the suppression of information as of a certain manner of presenting information, and our intention is at most to delay, and to give the wholesome aspect first." "[F]or the rest, in this matter—leave them alone."

=== Chapter 9: The Organization of Higher Education ===
At the age of fifteen, after "nine or ten years of increasingly serious Schooling (Primary Education)," Wells would have inferior students shunted into "employment suited to their capacity, employment which should not carry with it any considerable possibility of prolific marriage," and have the others proceed to "Secondary Education, or College." Here, he stresses the importance of "good general text-books in each principal subject" developed by universities as the basis of instruction, rather than a professor's lectures. Students must be engaged in "discussion, reproduction, and dispute" of the facts and ideas of their subject—a "substantial mental training" for a specialty being more important than cultivation of a "general culture." He contemplates four possible courses for the student: "The Classical, the Historical, the Biological, and the Physical." In the third stage of education, "the University Course," lasting "for three or four years after eighteen or twenty-one," in such subjects as medicine, law, engineering, philosophy and theology, physical science, etc. Wells also insists on the importance of ensuring that "serious books" be available in public libraries, with guides to reading in various subjects.

=== Chapter 10: Thought in the Modern State ===
Upon thought depends the hope of achieving civilization, for society is now hobbled by having become "a heterogeneous confusion without any secure common grounds of action." Thought requires

- "a sympathetic and intelligent atmosphere"
- a "language ... ready for ... use"
- "a certain minimum of training and preparation"
- a sense that "for some reason—not necessarily a worldly one—the thing [is] 'worth while.'"

"Literature is a vitally necessary function of the modern state." What is most needed at present in English thought is to put "critical literature" on a sound footing, and Wells proposes the organization of "a large Guild of literary men and women," as well as "university lectureships and readerships in contemporary criticism." As for literature, Wells argues that "it is only by the payment of authors, and if necessary their endowment in a spacious manner, and in particular by the entire separation of the rewards of writing from the accidents of the book market, that the function of literature can be adequately discharged in the modern state." This should be awarded not by a single body but according to the principle of "Many Channels," and inclusively rather than exclusively: if many "shams" are subsidized, "it scarcely matters." Further, in order to "protect the author from the pressure of immediate necessities," copyright should rest inalienably in his hands, any countervailing arrangement being limited to term of seven years, unless the author void copyright altogether as a "present to the world." Wells suggests the endowment of "a thousand or so authors," and offers, a detailed plan of how this could be done, as "an efficient starting-point" that will doubtless be developed in many directions, a process he calls the "innervation of society."

=== Chapter 11: The Man's Own Share ===
Wells's vision of "New Republicanism" culminates in "the rough outline of an ideal new state, a New Republic, a great confederation of English-speaking republican communities, each with its non-hereditary aristocracy, scattered about the world, speaking a common language, possessing a common literature and a common scientific and, in its higher stages at least, a common educational organization." Many "pioneers and experimenters" are already working to fulfill this vision. "[I]n a few years" this "will have become a great world movement," though only "the young" (under thirty) will see "the Promised Land." Only "a few thousands" of devoted New Republicans are needed to realize this vision.

=== Appendix: A Paper on Administrative Areas Read before the Fabian Society [March 1903] ===
Wells rejects communistic socialism and proclaims himself a "moderate socialist" whose goal is "equality of opportunity and freedom for complete individual development." His argument against "private owners" and in favor of "public officials" is based on the principle of efficiency. And this is his reason for condemning existing "local government bodies" as "impossibly small," because "a revolution in the methods of locomotion" has fundamentally altered the economy. Administrators need to adjust to "a larger community of a new type," as Wells explained in Anticipations. In southern England this should embrace "the whole valley of the Thames and its tributaries" as well as "Sussex and Surrey, and the east coast counties up to the Wash," i.e. all of southeastern England.

== Composition ==
The success of Anticipations in 1901 led to a demand for a sequel, which Wells wrote while his wife was pregnant with his second child, Frank Richard, born on October 31, 1903.

Graham Wallas greatly influenced Mankind in the Making, especially the first few chapters. Their collaboration on the book occasioned on September 19, 1902, one of Wells's longest and most revealing letters. Shortly after the publication of Mankind in the Making Wells and Wallas hiked for two weeks in Switzerland; their exchanges greatly influenced Wells's next venture in social thought, A Modern Utopia. Later, Wallas would also help Wells with The Work, Wealth and Happiness of Mankind (1932).

== Reception ==
Wells considered Mankind in the Making weaker than his other books on modern socialism, Anticipations, A Modern Utopia, and New Worlds for Old: in his Experiment in Autobiography he describes the book as "my style at its worst and my matter at its thinnest, and quoting it makes me feel very sympathetic with those critics who, to put it mildly, restrain their admiration for me." It was praised, though, by Henry James, Leopold Amery, Ford Madox Ford, Ray Lankester, Morley Roberts, Violet Paget (Vernon Lee), and C.F.G. Masterman; many of them, however, found it excessively optimistic. Arnold Bennett called the book sloppy in thought and turgid in expression. Joseph Conrad thought it showed Wells to be "so strangely conservative at bottom."

Wells was disappointed that most reviewers took the book as categorical and predictive rather than as tentative and exploratory.
