= The Soul of a Bishop =

1917 novel by H. G. Wells

- First US edition
- Author: H. G. Wells
- Illustrator: Charles Allan Gilbert
- Language: English
- Publisher: Cassell (UK); Macmillan (US)
- Publication date: 1917
- Publication place: United Kingdom
- Pages: 341

The Soul of a Bishop is a 1917 novel by H. G. Wells.

== Plot summary ==
The Soul of a Bishop tells the story of a spiritual crisis that leads Edward Scrope, Lord Bishop of Princhester, to give up his diocese in England's industrial heartland and leave the Anglican Church. Troubled during World War I by doctrinal doubts and a sense of the irrelevance of his Anglicism as well as nervousness and insomnia, a crisis is precipitated by a visit to a wealthy parishioner's home where he meets an extremely wealthy American widow, Lady Sunderbund. To her he speaks for the first time of his religious discontent. Shortly thereafter he takes a drug that, instead of mitigating his symptoms, gives him "a new and more vivid apprehension of things." The bishop experiences a mystical vision of "the Angel of God" and then God in the North Library of the Athenaeum Club, London. He emerges from the experience convinced that he must leave the Church, but is persuaded by an old mentor, Bishop Likeman, to wait three months before doing anything, during which time he continues in his episcopal duties.

Bishop Scrope keeps these developments from his wife, Lady Ella, and his four daughters until Lady Sunderbund arrives unannounced in Princhester, vowing to become his spiritual pupil. The strain of this new situation leads him to take Dr. Dale's drug a second time, and under its influence he has a second vision, this time of the terrestrial globe in a state of spiritual ferment to which the world's clergy is not ministering. Under the influence of this revelation he delivers a heretical confirmation address in the cathedral and resolves thereafter to leave the Church. Lady Sunderbund wishes to devote her riches to helping him found a new church, but in the process of developing plans for it Scrope realizes, in a third vision that this time is not mediated by any drug, that in the new religion he must serve "there must be no idea of any pulpit, of any sustained mission." In a final epiphany, he realizes that his refusal to "trust his family to God" has been holding him back, and that "this distrust has been the flaw in the faith of all religious systems hitherto." Five years after it began, Scrope's spiritual crisis is resolved.

== Themes ==
The Soul of a Bishop is a novelistic treatment of themes Wells developed in another book published the same year, God the Invisible King. In that volume, which was widely discussed at the time, as in The Soul of a Bishop, Wells rejects the theological doctrine of the Trinity that he attributed to the Council of Nicaea (the novel opens with Scrope dreaming about the Council of Nicaea).

Wells experienced a religious conversion during World War I; his biographer David C. Smith reports that this conversion "did not last long, and mirrored somewhat similar experiences widely recorded in France and England" that were provoked by the war. These beliefs proved to be only a passing phase; "[e]ssentially . . . Wells had tried Christianity again, albeit in a version much altered from that normally taught, and had found it wanting." Another biographer, Vincent Brome, wrote that "within a few years, [Wells's] natural streak of Voltairian anti-clericalism had re-asserted itself with all its old vigour. Later in life he was a little uneasy about the lapse."
