= The Salvaging of Civilization =

Non-fiction book written by H.G. Wells

The Salvaging of Civilization: The Probable Future of Mankind
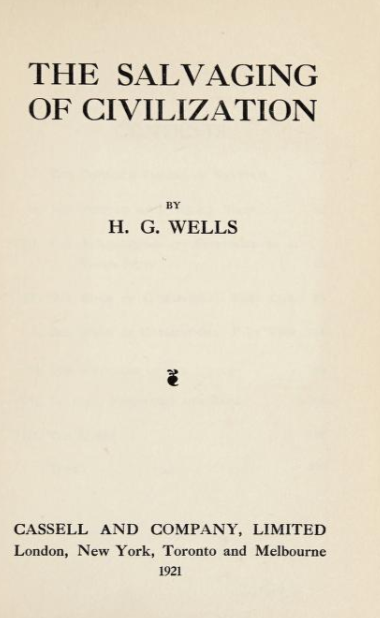
- Title page for The Salvaging of Civilization (1921)
- Author: H. G. Wells
- Publisher: The Macmillan Company
- Publication date: 1921

The Salvaging of Civilization: The Probable Future of Mankind is a non-fiction book by H. G. Wells which addresses the possibility of a future world state. It was published by The Macmillan Company of New York, for the first time in 1921.

== Chapters ==
The table of contents is as follows:

1. The Probable Future of Mankind
2. The Project of a World State
3. The Enlargement of Patriotism to a World State
4. The Bible of Civilization part I
5. The Bible of Civilization part II
6. The Schooling of the World
7. College, Newspaper and Book
8. The Envoy
9. Bibliography
