= Frederick William Sanderson =

British educator (1857–1922)

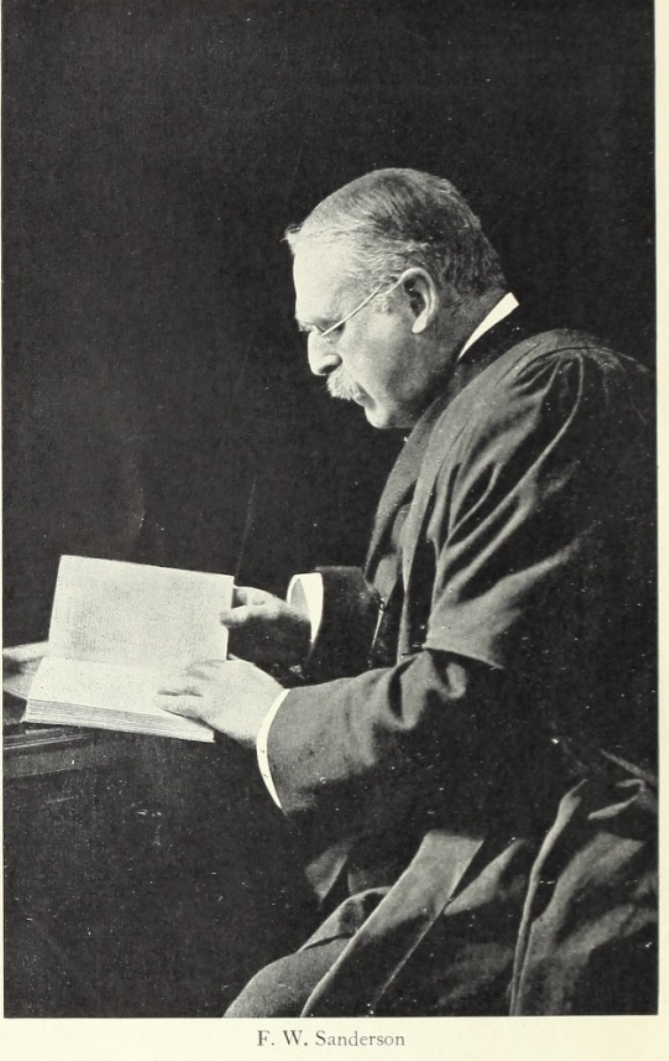

Frederick William Sanderson (13 May 1857 – 15 June 1922) was headmaster of Oundle School from 1892 until his death. He was an education reformer, and both at Oundle, and previously at Dulwich College where he had started as assistant master, he introduced innovative programmes of education in engineering. Under his headmastership, Oundle saw a reversal of a decline from which it had been suffering in the middle of the 19th century, with school enrollment rising from 92 at the time of his appointment to 500 when he died.

Sanderson was the inspiration for the progressive headmaster character in H. G. Wells' novel Joan and Peter. Wells had sent his own sons to Oundle, and was friendly with Sanderson. After Sanderson's death, which occurred shortly after delivering an address to Wells and others, Wells initially worked on his official biography, entitled Sanderson of Oundle, but later abandoned it in favour of an unofficial biography, The Story of a Great Schoolmaster.

== Background, family, and education ==
Sanderson was born on 13 May 1857, the youngest son of Thomas Sanderson (of Brancepeth) who worked on the estate of Viscount Boyne (Baron Brancepeth), and Margaret Andrews. He attended the village school at Brancepeth, and was later a pupil teacher at the national school in nearby Tudhoe. Starting in 1876, he attended Hatfield Hall in Durham University, where he was the Van Mildert Theological Scholar, received a first-class BA in mathematics and physical science in 1877, and in 1881 was elected a university fellow. In the meantime, he had won an open mathematical scholarship to Christ's College, Cambridge, to which he was admitted on 5 December 1878 and where in 1882 he received a B.A., bracketed as 11th wrangler. Until 1885, the year he received his MA at Cambridge, he was a lecturer at Girton College.

He married Jane Hodgson (of Broughton Hall, Cumberland) in 1885, and they had two sons and one daughter: Roy Broughton (1889–1918, killed in France), Thomas Stuart (born 1890) who became a barrister, and Mary Dorothea (born 1897). From 1893, she ran the boarding house for Oundle School's preparatory department.

== Dulwich College ==
Sanderson's earliest ventures into educational reform began in 1885, when the Master of Dulwich College, the Reverend James Edward Cowell Welldon, invited him to come to the school and be an assistant master teaching physics. Welldon himself had been appointed some two years before, and his appointment of Sanderson developed from the work of a special committee, including Welldon, which had met on 11 June 1884. One of the things that the committee had discussed was a perceived lack of teaching facilities at the college for practical mechanics, a subject that had been raised the year before in the February edition of the college magazine, The Alleynian. Both the master and the board of governors were in favour of such expansion, and on 1 May 1885, Welldon formally invited Sanderson to take up the post of physics master, at an annual salary of £300. Sanderson historian Richard J. Palmer observes that it is "indicative of the importance of the post" that the only master at the college who was paid a higher salary than Sanderson's starting salary was C. Bryans, the Senior French Master.

The next year, 1886, Sanderson's programme of change had begun. He established an engineering side to the curriculum, that included physics, mathematics, workshop practice, and mechanical drawing. This reform and reorganisation was particularly notable for its practical, hands-on approach: boys didn't use models or drawings, but rather worked with and experimented upon actual working engines, dynamos, and other machines. The engineering laboratory had a working steam engine, for example.

== Oundle School ==
Dulwich was far from the only school in the middle-to-late 19th century that was feeling the pressure to modernise and to expand its curriculum to include engineering and the sciences. Such pressure was widely felt by many schools. One such was Oundle School, whose failure to keep up with the times had led it into a period of decline. In July 1892, the Oundle Court of the Grocer's Company, the governing body of the school, appointed Sanderson as the new headmaster.

=== Initial reception ===
Sanderson's initial few years at Oundle were difficult ones. He faced stiff opposition to his reforms from staff, boys, and townspeople. Partly this was because of his background. He didn't have holy orders, hadn't attended a public school, wasn't particularly athletic, spoke with a strong Durham accent, and had a violent temper. The lack of holy orders, whilst insisting upon leading religious services at the school, raised questions of his religious orthodoxy. Because of the lack of a public school education, people held that he didn't have experience of what boarding school education was about. Of the lack of an athletic record, one of the biographers wrote in the official school biography:

It is an undeniable fact, I fear, that to command the full respect of the very young male a master must give some proof of physical prowess or at least have some athletic legend attached to his name. It was even suggested that the Head was "not a public-school man and did not know what was what," and – precious examples of what is what! – that his bow ties were of the "made-up" variety and his cuffs detachable. Such is the snobbishness of little boys that these ridiculous falsehoods were enough to prejudice one's regard.

— Staff 1923, pp. 28–29

He also wasn't well served by the fact that he wasn't very good at communicating his ideas, and it took a long time for him to convey to people what he was planning and aiming to achieve. "It is possible he would have found his earlier years at Oundle easier if he had been more articulate." opined one of the masters. The school magazine, The Old Oundelian, said of him that to him words were "an obdurate medium to the end".

However, Sanderson appointed new assistant masters who shared his views, and ousted those masters that he had inherited from his predecessor who did not, such that after some seven years only three of the latter remained. (The dismissal of the Reverend Richard Edmonds Jones, the school chaplain, led to back and forth on the letters pages of the Journal of Education when Edmonds Jones wrote a letter of complaint about how he had been treated by Sanderson. The Journal editors decided to refuse all further correspondence on the subject in October 1899.)

=== Building programme ===
Sanderson's vision for the future of schools can be seen from an address that he delivered at the University of Leeds:

To enable schools to carry out this prime duty, i.e. to make the highest use of each member, which is to say to make the school highly efficient, it is necessary to have a wide range of subjects in the school. We shall see what changes should come over schools. They must be built in a large and spacious manner, the class-rooms being replaced by halls or galleries, in which the children can move in the midst of abundance, and do and make and research; not confined to a class-room. We shall see how much wider the range of masters must be. We must have the crafts well represented, and a wide range of science, with workshops, scientific laboratories, gardens, fields. Also several languages will be taught, and there should be a spacious library, and art-room, and museum.

— Frederick William Sanderson, The Service of Schools, 1920

This vision can be compared to the building programme that Sanderson undertook at Oundle over the years, which comprised the construction of laboratories, workshops, metalwork and woodwork shops, a forge, a foundry, botanical gardens, a meteorological station, an experimental farm, a drawing office, an observatory, and a library.

The observatory was constructed the year before Sanderson died, 1921, on a school playing field, the Home Close, near to the centre of Oundle town, to house a 4-inch (102 mm) Cooke refracting telescope that had been presented to the school by W. T. Carr MP, an old boy of the school.

The museum was intended to be a "Temple of Vision", containing exhibits that illustrated the progress of humanity, and diagrams and charts of history. Its construction was funded by Sir Alfred Fernandez Yarrow, who like Sanderson had lost a son (Eric Yarrow, an Oundelian) in the First World War. The project wasn't completed at the time of Sanderson's death, and he wavered somewhat on the name, sometimes referring to his idea as a "Tent of Meeting" or a "House of Vision". It is now the Yarrow Gallery.

=== Curriculum reform ===
In addition to the extensive building programme, Sanderson completely reformed Oundle's curriculum. He introduced wholly new subjects including biochemistry and agriculture, and restructured the school into Classical, Modern Languages, Engineering, and Science sides. The latter two attracted boys to the school who would not have been interested in a strictly classical education. He also widened the scope of the teaching of the humanities, geography and history, to a degree unusual for the time.

In the workshops, boys undertook a range of practical projects. During the First World War they made parts for munitions, and in 1905 a reversing engine for a 4000 horsepower marine engine. Workshop projects were organised as group work, and in the style of an industrial factory: individual tasks were allotted to individual boys, but what they produced had then to be integrated with the output of others.

A similar approach was adopted for non-engineering subjects, such as history and literature. A whole form would be subdivided into groups, each responsible for studying one aspect of a particular subject, whose collective work would be combined to form an overall result. Pupils were encouraged to be "Dalton-like", and to pursue original research of their own. The senior boys also took part in what were called "conversaziones": presentations to their peers (and others) of practical experiments in the sciences, categorised into physics plus mechanics, chemistry, biology, or workshop. These took place in the spring term, and boys who participated were allowed four or five days off all other work immediately before Speech Day, for work on their presentations, although at any other time work was expected to be done outwith school hours.

Other innovations included the boys of the school, each year, producing one of the plays of Shakespeare, and, in the winter term, an oratorio involving all of the boys of the school. More than one boy was cast for each part in the play, to provide a share in the experience for each boy. In the teaching of English, Sanderson preferred to employ the works of John Ruskin, or any other such "uncharted" author, over Shakespeare; on the grounds that annotated copies of the works of such authors, providing ready-made opinions to be regurgitated for examinations, were not available, and therefore boys had to form their own opinions. He favoured Ruskin in particular because his opinions were controversial, and thus potentially stimulating.

Sanderson's encouragement of engineering and practical work greatly influenced, amongst others, the young Joseph Needham. In a 1973 interview, Needham recalled Sanderson thus:

He was very historically minded. His so-called scripture lessons, for example, were not really very much to do with theology, but tended to treat the Bible in a purely historical manner. He also brought the school fame through an expansion of science and engineering, and though I read classics, I still had to spend a lot of time gaining workshop experience. I learnt how to work a lathe, and how to do steam-engine compression diagrams. And these things stood me in enormous good stead later when, for example, I came to write the volume [of Science and Civilisation in China] on mechanical engineering in Chinese history.

— Joseph Needham, (Dickson 1973, p. 122)

=== Educational ethos ===
Sanderson's aforementioned address to the University of Leeds also encompassed his vision of the ways that education should occur, continuing as it does:

The methods will change from learning in class-room to researching in the galleries; from learning things of the past to searching into the future; competition giving place to co-operative work. And somewhere within the field of work each boy or girl may find his own part, and so take part in the creative life, and grow by doing it, and be 'bitten' with the desire to do, and gain in purpose, in determination, in self-determination, in confidence, and outlook. My own view is that at an early stage every effort should be made to get a boy at a 'grip' with some part of knowledge, and that we must not be afraid to specialise at the early ages of fifteen to seventeen, for when once a boy has been caught with the love of research he will go on, and can widen out at a later stage. In fact, he will find the need for extending his knowledge and capacities. Examinations tend the other way, with, as I think, disastrous effects on many a creative boy.

— Frederick William Sanderson, The Service of Schools, 1920

Sanderson's views on education were very similar to Wells', and Sanderson's reform programme was a practical instance of the progressive, science-based, coöperative, and systematic reformism that Wells himself also advocated. Both Sanderson and Wells believed that education should be a synthesis of the arts, humanities, and sciences; geared towards the individual aptitudes and interests of each pupil; and applied and technical in addition to theoretical and experimental. Wells also influenced Sanderson to include the teaching of Russian in the curriculum.

Sanderson regarded schools as altruistic institutions, which should encourage coöperation rather than competition, and regarded them as microcosms of the world that they exist in. In the address to the University of Leeds, he argued that it was more important "for the effective growth of the nation" to "rescue the submerged, and raise the average" – in other words to ensure that the weak are not pushed out of education and to increase the average educational level of all pupils – than to focus exclusively upon enabling the progress of "men of ability".

On the subject of coöperation over competition, he asserted that "the two are not of the same order of dimensions", and that the stimulation to be obtained by a pupil from the former was far greater than the stimulation from the latter. He also maintained that boys learned best by doing, and that all school work should be, at least in some sense, creative.

Sanderson spoke and wrote on his ideas for education reform. In addition to writing Sanderson 1921, Sanderson 1922, and the preface to Gould 1921, he was a member of the 1916 Committee on the Neglect of Science, a lobbyist group of prominent scientists that had been formed after a letter written to The Times claiming that Britain's failure in the First World War to that point had in part been to the neglect of "physical science" teaching in public schools in favour of the classics. The committee published a book in 1918, to which Sanderson contributed Sanderson 1918. He also addressed the May 1919 conference of the League for the Promotion of Science in education, the successor to the 1916 Neglect of Science committee, and in 1917 was a member of a committee of the British Association (alongside Henry Edward Armstrong) that had been charged with reporting on the state of science education in British schools.

== Death and posthumous biographies ==
Sanderson collapsed and died of a heart attack on 15 June 1922 at a meeting of the National Union of Scientific Workers (with Wells as the chairman) in the old Botanical Theatre, University College, London, to whom he had just given an address entitled "The duty and service of science in the new era".

Sanderson had been the inspiration for the character of Henderson, the progressive headmaster of the fictional Caxton School in Wells' novel Joan and Peter. After Sanderson died, Wells was initially involved in the official biography of Sanderson, entitled Sanderson of Oundle and co-authored by over fifty staff of the school, whose proceeds were to go to the school. However, Sanderson's widow objected to the way that Wells portrayed her husband, and Wells left the project in favour of writing his own biography, The Story of a Great Schoolmaster. It was published in 1923 by the same periodicals that had serialised Joan and Peter, The New Leader and The New Republic, and published in book form in 1924. It is also in volume 24 of the Atlantic Edition of the Works of H.G. Wells, immediately following the second part of Joan and Peter, where, incidentally, the character name of the fictional headmaster changed from Henderson to Westinghouse. In the biography, Wells wrote:

Of all the men I have met ... only one has stirred me to a biographical effort. This one exception is F.W. Sanderson, for many years the headmaster of Oundle School. I think him beyond question the greatest man I have ever known with any degree of intimacy. ... To tell his story is to reflect upon all the main educational ideas of the last half-century, and to revise our conception of the process and purpose of the modern community in relation to education.

— Wells 1924, p. 1

Wells's biography and the school-staff-written biography portray Sanderson differently: Wells (who deplored the neglect of the Temple of Vision after Sanderson's death) concentrated upon Sanderson's ideals, whereas the staff concentrated upon Sanderson's actual work at the school. The contrast between the two accounts of Sanderson was described by William George Walker, in his 1956 history of the school, thus:

The composite [staff-written] volume, as was natural, erred on the side of hero-worship, whereas Mr Wells's [own book] showed, as some think, characteristic lapses from good taste. Somehow, between them, the real man has got overlaid and Sanderson is on his way to becoming a legendary figure.

— Walker 1956, p. 570

In 2002 Richard Dawkins, an old boy of the school, was invited to the school to present the first in what was to be a series of annual Oundle Lectures. Michael Downes, a modern language master at the school and the school's recently appointed Sanderson Fellow, suggested to Dawkins that he use Sanderson as the subject of his lecture. Dawkins did so, and just over a week later, wrote an article for The Guardian based upon his lecture (Dawkins 2002), which he then included as a chapter in his book A Devil's Chaplain. Historian A. N. Wilson called it a "joyous essay" in which Dawkins quoted "quite extensively" from the sermons that Sanderson had given in the school's chapel. Wilson noted that Dawkins' account, whilst focussing upon Sanderson's inspirational qualities with respect to science and engineering, that Wilson likened to Dawkins' own, had stripped from the quotations (as compared to the texts of those sermons to be found in the 1923 official biography) any mention of religion, despite Sanderson's background in theology. Wilson observed that "some would consider it dishonest" of Dawkins to have omitted this, since from Dawkins' nonetheless laudatory and moving biography the reader would not have learned that Sanderson was a religious man. Mark T. Coppenger, professor of Christian Apologetics at the Southern Baptist Theological Seminary, was one person who did in fact consider it so, saying that Dawkins' biography of Sanderson, which he too described as one that lauded Sanderson, was, in its omissions, "dishonest but understandable".

Dawkins is one of several recent commentators who have compared Sanderson to, or put him in the place of, modern headmasters. He observed that today Sanderson would have been headmaster of "a large, mixed comprehensive" and would have been "contemptuous of the pussyfooting, lawyer-driven fastidiousness of Health and Safety, and the accountant-driven league-tables that dominate modern education and actively encourage schools to put their own interests before those of their pupils". David E. Hellawell, professor of Education Management at the University of Central England observed that the headmaster-as-autocrat attitude, related in one history of Oundle School by the statement that Sanderson's masters were required to "see eye to eye with him; if they did not they must go", would land a modern British headmaster in the local newspaper, and possibly in jail.

Jonathan Gathorne-Hardy, in his 1979 book The Public School Phenomenon, praised Sanderson even though he was highly critical of public school education in general.

== Legacy and commemoration ==
Few of the headmasters during the inter-war period adopted Sanderson's ideas. Wells was particularly critical of Kenneth Fisher, Sanderson's immediate successor at Oundle, for not maintaining the spirit of Sanderson's reformist programme.

The third Hadow Report (Hadow 1927) didn't mention Sanderson by name, but several of his ideas are identifiable therein.

Sanderson House, one of the boarding houses of Oundle School (now and since 2000 a girls' boarding house, after the school began to admit both sexes), is named after Sanderson and was constructed in 1938. From 1992 to 2002, a Sanderson Trust funded the appointment of a fellow at the school whose task was to further "in every possible way the opportunities open to Oundelians to understand the importance of industry to the prosperity of the nation". The position of Sanderson Fellow survives, although the funding trust no longer exists.

A bust of Sanderson, by Edward Lacey, once stood in the livery hall of the Grocers' Company. However, in the fire of 22 September 1965 it was completely melted. The original cast was still available, and another bust was made, that stood in the Piper Room until that room's refurbishment in 2001, when the bust was moved elsewhere.
