= Brynhild (novel) =

1937 novel by H.G. Wells

- First UK edition
- Author: H. G. Wells
- Original title: Brynhild, or The Show of Things
- Language: English
- Publisher: Methuen (UK); Scribner's (US)
- Publication date: 1937
- Publication place: United Kingdom
- Pages: 302
- Preceded by: Star Begotten
- Followed by: The Camford Visitation

Brynhild, or The Show of Things is a 1937 novel by H. G. Wells.

== Plot summary ==
Rowland Palace is a novelist married to a distant cousin, Brynhild, a "Quiet Lovely" who is twelve years younger than he. Inordinately sensitive to criticism, Palace has been withdrawing from a wife who is becoming critical of him. When he decides he needs to engage a publicist to cultivate his neglected public image, he hides his plan. The publicist he chooses, Immanuel Cloote, proves to be an agent with imagination and "manifest gusto."

Meanwhile, Brynhild meets and becomes the unique confidant of Alfred Bunter, a rising young novelist of whose popular success Palace is jealous. Bunter confides to Brynhild that he is really David Lewis, from Cardiff, who has left his wife and assumed a new identity as an author. Scarcely has he confided in Brynhild, however, than his true identity is exposed by someone who turns out to be Mr. Cloote, intent on sabotaging Rowland Palace's literary competitors. The plight of Bunter/Lewis elicits Brynhild's sympathies. Brynhild, who had been feeling that she was "too aloof for life," gains a new sense of confidence and self-assurance from her brief affair, and the novel closes with the news that she is with child.

== Themes ==
Brynhild is principally a literary satire in which Wells mocks developments in the contemporary literary scene in Great Britain, especially with respect to publicity. The novel also scrutinises marital misunderstanding in a comic vein.
