= The Pearl of Love =

- Short story by H. G. Wells
- Country: United Kingdom
- Language: English
- Genre: Fiction

Publication
- Publisher: The Strand Magazine
- Publication date: December 1925

"The Pearl of Love" is a 1925 short story about devotion by H. G. Wells.

== Plot summary ==
The narrator of Wells's tale—or Wells, if you will—begins by saying that while "[t]he pearl is lovelier than the most brilliant of crystalline stones, the moralist declares, because it is made through the suffering of a living creature," he himself "feel[s] none of the fascination of pearls." The tale he tells is said to be "familiar to students of medieval Persian prose," and a considerable amount of commentary has accumulated around it. But the narrator says he cannot decide "whether The Pearl of Love is the cruellest of stories or only a gracious fable of the immortality of beauty."

A young prince in northern India meets and falls deeply in love with, “a young maiden of indescribable beauty and delightfulness.” Theirs is a love, "beyond anything you have ever dreamt of love." The couple marries but have spent little more than a year together when the prince's beloved dies from, "some venomous sting that came to her in a thicket." After days of silent mourning, the prince orders that his wife’s body be placed in a coffin of silver and lead inside a coffin of precious scented wood wrought in gold inside an alabaster sarcophagus inlaid with gems. Some time later, after long brooding, the Prince announces his intention to renounce all further commerce with women and devote his life to constructing a monument to his beloved, to be known as the Pearl of Love. The people consent.

For years the Prince works. First he builds "a pavilion of cunning workmanship" with a dome, but later replaces that dome with a grander one. His architectural sophistication increases, and he realizes "new possibilities in arch and wall and buttress," develops a "finer and colder" "sense of colour", and, wearying "altogether of carvings and pictures and inlaid ornamentation", has them "put aside". The prince comes "to care . . . more and more" for "a great aisle" that permits "a vista" of, "the snowy wildernesses of the great mountain, the lord of all mountains, two hundred miles away." All who look upon the Pearl of Love are "exalted", yet the prince feels that, "The Pearl of Love had still something for him to do . . . before his task was done." He realizes that the problem is "a certain disproportion about the sarcophagus" that causes it to "lay incongruously in the great vista of the Pearl of Love." He returns with "an architect and two master craftsmen and a small retinue" and then, after long, silent deliberation—"no one knew the thoughts that passed through his mind"—he points at his wife’s sarcophagus and says, "Take that thing away."

== Background ==
"The Pearl of Love" was first published in The Strand Magazine in December 1925.

In 1927 Wells told the Sunday Express that "The Pearl of Love" and "The Country of the Blind" were his favorites among the stories he had written.
