= The Holy Terror (Wells novel) =

1939 novel by H. G. Wells

- First US edition
- Author: H. G. Wells
- Language: English
- Publisher: Michael Joseph (UK); Simon & Schuster (US)
- Publication date: 1939
- Publication place: United Kingdom
- Pages: 454

The Holy Terror is a 1939 work by H. G. Wells that is in part an analysis of fascism and in part a utopian novel.

== Plot summary ==
The Holy Terror presents itself as a biography of Rudolf "Rud" Whitlow, who is born with such an aggressive temperament that scarcely is he born but his monthly nurse exclaims: "It's a Holy Terror!" Rud Whitlow goes on to become the founder of the first world state, long a Wellsian dream.

The Holy Terror is divided into four books. The events of Book One take place in the recognizable recent English past, although Wells warns that "Every person, place and thing in this story—even the countries in which it happens—are fictitious . . . The England, the America, the London in this book are not the England, America and London of geography and journalism, but England, America, and London transposed into imaginative narrative." The novel even takes a futuristic turn and the action of the novel extends into the early 1950s.

Book One describes Rud Whitlow's early life and education, including his years at university, where Richard Carstall, a childhood acquaintance who is the son of the doctor who brought Rud into the world, recognizes and admires Rud's emerging political genius. On a summer walking tour through the English countryside Rud meets Chiffan, a politically seasoned militant activist who is also disenchanted with democracy and left politics. Chiffan becomes a sort of advisor and mentor to Rud Whitlow.

In Book Two, Rud is taken up by a wealthy half-American, Steenhold, who believes in Rud's political future and foots the bill as he gathers a group of like-minded collaborators who work out of "two large flats in Camborne Square just out of the Euston Road." These include Rogers, a boxer who handles security, and Bodisham, an intellectually inclined strategist trained at the London School of Economics who will be the mastermind of the future World Revolution. The Group (as it calls itself) successfully stages a coup to oust from the leadership of the Popular Socialist Party its founder, Lord Horatio Bohun, a character inspired by Oswald Mosley's British Union of Fascists. The putsch does not succeed, however, before a brief imprisonment reveals the cowardice and fear that underlie Rud Whitlow's bold aggressiveness.

In Book Three, Rud and his collaborators purge the party of anti-Semitism and rename it the Common-Sense Movement. Over a twelve-year period they fulfill a project of which Wells had long dreamed and which he described in The Open Conspiracy (1930): the foundation of a world state. Rud regularly visits America to promote his views. Their movement is joined by "a disgruntled military genius and expert" named Reedly and "a brilliant and quite disinterested aeronautical engineer" named Bellacourt. A future chief of secret police named Thirp also joins. By 1944 the Common Man's Party is known everywhere in the world. When the global War of the Ideologies breaks out and develops toward a worldwide stalemate, Rud is able to anticipate a coup on Reedly's part. He uses Bellacourt's control of air power not only to exterminate Reedly, but also to decapitate the military leadership of the various world powers. Steenhold dies in this final conflict, but the others survive to establish, with opportune support from the World Association for the Advancement of Science, "a Common World-State."

Book Four, however, reveals that Rud is not the enlightened leader the world takes "the Director" to be. The fierce aggression in Rud Whitlow's character re-emerges as The Group finds it necessary to mount a propaganda campaign adulating him as a world savior. Stalin-like, Rud develops a taste for secret police and secret prisons. He turns on collaborators who try to restrain him, including Chiffan, who is executed for having dared to warn Whitlow that he is betraying their revolution. Rud is becoming obsessed with the Jews and beginning to plot "an ultimate pogrom," "a cumulative massacre," when Richard Carstall, now a famous physician, is able to take matters into his own hand and kill the dictator in his clinic. But he keeps his deed a secret, and as the book concludes Carstall is discussing with his young son an official history of the World Revolution in which Rud Whitlow is still considered a hero.

== Composition and reception ==
Wells, 72, completed reviewing the proofs for The Holy Terror in December 1938, just before embarking on a lecture tour of Australia.

Wells' old friend Richard Gregory, the editor of Nature from 1919 to 1939, "found the message in The Holy Terror alarming, but very true." J. B. Priestley also appreciated the novel and discussed it.

Biographers Norman and Jeanne Mackenzie believe that The Holy Terror demonstrates "the link between the unconscious fears and aggressions which were so marked in [Wells'] youth and the plans for the saving of the world which ran through his adult writing." Similarly, another biographer, Michael Sherborne, sees in the novel "an unhinged psychodrama concerning Wells' own yearnings for extremes of discipline and freedom."
