= A Dream of Armageddon =

Short story by H. G. Wells

- Short story by H. G. Wells
- Country: United Kingdom
- Genre: Science fiction

Publication

"A Dream of Armageddon" is a short story by H. G. Wells which was first published in 1901 in the British weekly magazine Black and White.

== Plot summary ==
The story opens aboard a train, when an unwell-looking man strikes up a conversation with the narrator when he sees him reading a book about dreams. The white-faced man says that he has little time for dream analysis because, he says, his dreams are killing him.

He goes on to tell how he has been experiencing consecutive dreams of an unspecified future time in which he is a major political figure who has given up his position to live with a younger woman on the island of Capri. The dreamer describes the island in detail, despite never having visited it, which impresses the narrator, who has actually been to Capri. The dreamer tells how his dream idyll comes to an end. While dancing, he is approached by an envoy from his own country who implores him to return and resume his old role before his successor brings about a war. However, this would mean leaving the woman he loves, and his dream self chooses love over duty.

For three weeks of dreams, the solicitor is present at the collapse of the paradisical island of Capri and the future world, while war draws closer and flights of military aircraft are described flying overhead. The global war finally erupts, and his dream life ends in worldwide catastrophe and personal tragedy: the dreamer sees his love killed and experiences his death. At the very end of the story the protagonist reveals that despite being killed in his dream, he nevertheless carried on dreaming even as his body was being ravaged by "great birds that fought and tore."

== Adaptations ==
An adaptation of "A Dream of Armageddon" was transmitted on the CBS drama program Escape, on 5 September 1948. In 2000 the National Theater of the Ear produced a dramatic adaptation of the short story for National Public Radio under the series title 2000X and which was picked up by Audible (store) for its catalog. A later adaptation, in two 30 minute episodes, was broadcast on BBC Radio 7 in 2008, read by Robert Bathurst.

Dai Fujikura composed an opera that premiered in November 2020 in Tokyo.

== Historical background ==
Historically, the Roman Emperor Tiberius withdrew to the island of Capri, leaving the actual governing of the Roman Empire to the ruthless Praetorian Prefect Sejanus; eventually, Tiberius moved to reassume power and destroy Sejanus and his supporters. This well-known historical episode might have inspired Wells' story.

== Influence on later writing ==
Later, in the 1934 The Shape of Things to Come, Wells took up on a larger scale the literary device of a person able to dream of the future and relate his dreams in the present - and also in the latter work, the dreams concern a future of catastrophic global war. The same device was also used by others such as Edgar Rice Burroughs and Jack Williamson as the frame story of, respectively, The Moon Maid and The Moon Men and of The Legion of Space.
