= Travels of a Republican Radical in Search of Hot Water =

1939 collection of essays by H.G. Wells

First edition (publ. Penguin Books)

Travels of a Republican Radical in Search of Hot Water is a collection of essays by H. G. Wells written in 1939, detailing his travels in Australia. It is best known for the following description:

A bush fire is not an orderly invader, but a guerrilla. It advances by rushes, by little venomous tongues of fire in the grass; it spreads by sparks burning leaves and bark. Its front is miles deep. It is here, it is there, like a swarm of venomous wasps. It shams dead and stabs you in the back. It encircles you so that there is no sure line of flight for its intended victims. It destroys bridges in your rear. It bars the road with blazing trees.
