= The Stolen Body =

- Short story by H. G. Wells
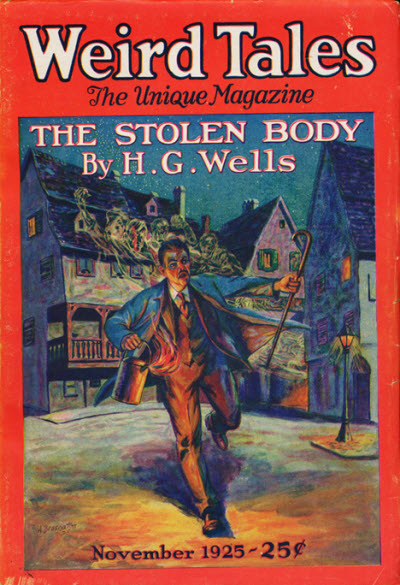
- Country: United Kingdom
- Genre: Science fiction

Publication
- Publication date: 1898

"The Stolen Body" is a science fiction short story by H. G. Wells that was originally published in The Strand Magazine (November 1898); collected in Twelve Stories and a Dream (1903) and Tales of the Unexpected (1924); reprinted in Weird Tales magazine (November 1925) and was later reprinted in many collections and anthologies.

== Plot summary ==
The story's main characters are a pair of casual paranormal researchers who are experimenting with the idea of astral projection. One night, one of them inadvertently succeeds in projecting his spirit from his body, which is then taken possession of by a malevolent entity in his absence. His partner receives a vivid sensation of him calling out for help and rushes to his residence, only to find him absent and the place in shambles. The researcher continues to search for his partner and learns that he has perpetrated a series of violent incidents around London. He seeks the aid of a medium, who he discovers had channelled his partner's spirit and finds that he has fallen down an excavation shaft and subsequently been abandoned by the possessing entity. They locate the shaft and rescue him, after which he recounts the story of his possession.
