= Joan and Peter =

1918 novel by H. G. Wells

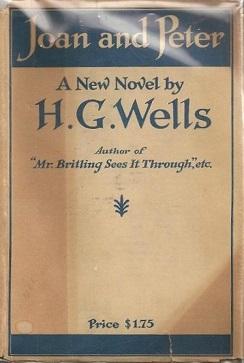
- First US edition
- Author: H. G. Wells
- Language: English
- Genre: Philosophical novel
- Publisher: Cassell (UK); Macmillan (US)
- Publication date: September 1918
- Publication place: United Kingdom
- Pages: 784

Joan and Peter, a 1918 novel by H. G. Wells, is at once a satirical portrait of late-Victorian and Edwardian England, a critique of the English educational system on the eve of World War I, a study of the impact of that war on English society, and a general reflection on the purposes of education. Wells regarded it as "one of the most ambitious" of his novels.

== Plot ==
The novel begins in 1893 with the birth of Peter Stublands, but the first three chapters are devoted to the lives of his parents. Peter's father, Arthur, is one of the heirs of a wealthy family of Quaker manufacturers from the West of England. His mother Dolly is the daughter of a vicar from a well-off family, but being intellectually inclined, she has "read herself out of the great Anglican culture." Arthur, artistically inclined but not especially gifted, is a devotee of the Arts and Crafts movement and a Fabian socialist. Dolly meets him and falls in love with him while she is studying "in the Huxley days as a free student at the Royal College of Science." Arthur designs a house near Limpsfield called the Ingle-Nook, where they live, and where Peter is born. Arthur has two sisters with advanced ideas, Aunt Phyllis and Aunt Phoebe, who are regular visitors.

Dolly, however, has retained strong feelings for a cousin who joined the navy, Oswald Sydenham, whose face is badly scarred from the bombardment of Alexandria, and is devoting his career to extending the British Empire in Africa. When Arthur's free-thinking goes so far as to make him unfaithful to Dolly, it is strongly implied that Oswald and Dolly fall in love, but Dolly eventually rejects Oswald's passionate appeal to defy convention and live with him in Central Africa. Dejected, Oswald returns to Africa. The reconciliation of Dolly and Arthur has a tragic consequence, however: on a trip meant to celebrate the overcoming of their differences, Arthur's recklessness with an amateur boatman causes them to drown off Capri.

In their wills, Dolly and Arthur had named Oswald as the guardian of their son; because of Dolly's leanings toward Oswald, Arthur changed his will before he died to replace him with three other guardians: Aunts Phoebe and Phyllis, on his side, and Lady Charlotte Sydenham on Dolly's, having assumed that she was a dignified, tolerable woman. The family solicitor, Mr. Sycamore, sends Oswald a letter telling him that, due to the lack of information, he has had to generalize and state that Dolly drowned before Arthur, therefore validating his will. This generalization results in an extended battle over the education of Peter and also of Joan, a child of Dolly's brother born out of wedlock and entrusted to them.

Phoebe and Phyllis are eccentrics devoted to the suffragette cause and undertake their guardianship with enthusiasm, but Lady Charlotte, "one of those large, ignorant, ruthless, Low-Church, wealthy, and well-born ladies who did so much to make England what it was in the days before the Great War," abhors their values. She schemes to christen Joan and Peter, then plots to remove the children from the faddish "School of St. George and the Venerable Bede," based on the ideas of Froebel and Ruskin, in order to educate them more traditionally. With the assistance of her solicitor, Lady Charlotte kidnaps the children; Peter is placed in the High Cross Preparatory School, located near Windsor Castle, and Joan finds herself at the mercy of an evil-spirited Mrs. Pybus, the sister of Lady Charlotte's maid. Peter is bullied and mistreated by fellow-students and teachers alike, and runs away after being unjustly punished; Joan falls ill with measles. Oswald returns to England after having "given nearly eighteen years to East and Central Africa," especially Uganda. It is 1903, and his health has forced him to return to England, determined to devote himself to the education of his wards.

The battle over control of the children's education ends when witnesses prove that Dolly perished after Arthur. As a result, her will prevails. Oswald becomes sole guardian of Joan and Peter and undertakes to find them the best education possible. He is disappointed to learn that there are no schools adapted to the needs of the time. Ultimately, he sends Peter to White Court and Joan to Highmorton School. Peter later attends Caxton, and Oswald moves to a home at Pelham Ford, in Ware, Hertfordshire. A lady named Mrs. Moxton keeps house.

Chapter 11, "Adolescence," is the longest of the novel, and analyzes in some detail the growth to maturity of Joan and Peter. That they have grown up as brother and sister delays the realization that they love each other; indeed, for much of their adolescence they are deeply at odds with one another, especially about their friends. But when Joan accidentally learns through a friend and Aunt Phyllis that her family is largely unrelated to Peter, deeper feelings re-emerge. Joan and Peter are now both students at Cambridge.

The Great War begins, and all the men of their acquaintance enlist. Oswald is invalided; most of Joan's lovers are killed in various ways; Peter joins the Royal Flying Corps. He is nearly killed in combat, and as he recovers from serious wounds that he becomes more enlightened about life. It is while he is on leave back in England that Joan tells Peter she loves him. They marry. Peter is again badly wounded when the observation balloon in which he is serving is shot down. But he is out of the war, and looks forward to working toward a future World State.

== Characters ==
Joan and Peter features an expansive cast of characters who are all connected to the protagonists, each contributing to the narrative to varying degrees.

=== Parents and their family ===
Presented in order of importance.

Dolly Sydenham was the mother of Peter.

Arthur Stubland was the father of Peter.

William Sydenham was the father of Joan; through Huntley (see below), Joan learns that he was also a poet. He eventually died in a motoring accident.

Fanny Dibenham was the mother of Joan; through Aunt Phyllis, Joan learns that she died soon after giving birth to her.

Oswald Sydenham is the cousin of Dolly and the guardians of Joan and Peter.

Aunts Phyllis and Phoebe are Arthur's sisters and Joan and Peter's guardians for about six years; of the two, Phoebe has the more radical ideas. She writes books and poems under the persona of a stitch-woman, is a suffragette, and Lady Charlotte, as well as being disgusted by their smoking cigarettes, suspects that she does not wear stays. Oswald is unsettled at her habit of leaving shocking books around the house. During the Great War, she starts sleepwalking (much to her sister's distress) and plans to write an "Open Letter to German Women". Aunt Phyllis is calmer, and she takes a motherly attitude to Joan.

=== Scholarly Acquaintances ===
Presented in order of death; if alive, in order of their being last mentioned. Pupils at the High Cross Preparatory School are unincluded - they do not voluntarily meet after Oswald becomes the children's guardians. For them, see "Other".

Troop was a friend of the two protagonists. He is an American who insists on calling Joan "Kid" and playing tennis by the rules, much to her and Peter's annoyance. He enlists six days before Peter; his fate is unknown.

Winterbaum was a friend of the two protagonists. During their years at the School of St. George and the Venerable Bede, he and Peter were briefly rivals. They re-unite at Cambridge, during a tea-party arranged by Bunny Cuspard (see below); he tells Joan that he admires cubism. He prides in taking Joan out to clubs; when he is in the army, he also wears fopperies but, in his "heroic" letters to Joan, he admits that he does not want to go any further to "the Contago peerage". He dies mysteriously in the Battle of Loos, and is the first of their circle of acquaintance to be killed during the Great War.

Wilmington was a friend of the two protagonists, particularly of Joan. He was a friend of Peter's at White Court, but when he takes him home to meet Joan, he falls in love with her immediately. Of all of her acquaintances, he loves her the most passionately, and meeting her before he dies, he realizes and tells her that she is always thinking of Peter when she's with him, and that he doubts Peter's faithfulness with her. During a Christmas ball-party, they particularly enjoy themselves: she creates an illusion that he can dance, and before he plays the Kreutzer Sonata to her she kisses him. He enlists as a gunner during the Great War, and soon he sends her lecture-length letters on the stupidity on the army. One day, he was setting up some six-inch guns and is moved against his will to what he knows is an inferior place, and is killed by a German bomb whilst making a gun-pit.

Bunny Cuspard was a friend of the two protagonists. Somewhat eccentric but light-hearted, he cannot take life particularly seriously, and during his time at Cambridge, he organizes "First Wednesday of the Month" tea-parties. At the start of the Great War, he struggles between being a conscientious objector or enlisting; he eventually becomes a soldier and resolves to simply shout and disarm the Germans. He is particularly haunted by two gruesome incidents he hears of in the army, hence his resolve. He and his regiment are sent to Ireland, and is shot fatally around the chest by a Sinn Féin sniper; interested in the drunken spinning of his legs and thinking that he has invented a new sort of dance ("the backwards-step"), he dies laughing.
It is briefly mentioned that he has a copy of Little Wars, a games-manual written by Wells.

Mir Jellaludin is a friend of the two protagonists. An Indian, he is a Muslim, but says that he is interested in every other faith. He meets Joan at a meeting, where she lectures on Buddhist principles; he eventually starts sending her books, poetry, and flowers. Peter is prejudiced against him at first meeting, but changes his mind when he visits him in hospital and he realizes that he saved his life in his dogfight. Jellaludin is severely disappointed that the British Army do not take on Indians as pilots, and is therefore working in the French Air Force.

The Sheldrick circle are an eccentric family who attended the School of St. George and the Venerable Bede. Their costume-parties inspire Miss Murgatroyd (see below) and Joan's dancing skills; one of their games are mentioned to be exciting. During the Great War, however, they take a pacifist stance and shelter Huntley; a dreamer, he was once one of Joan's lovers and reveals to her who her father was, but after she emotionally wounds him by telling him to enlist rather than visit him in Cornwall, he starts writing and spreading pacifist pamphlets; it is implied that he falls in love with one of the daughters, Babs, who is an actress.

=== Other ===
Presented in order of appearance.

The unnamed Italian boatman in Capri; he tells Arthur and Dolly Stublands that because he was a stonemason, his lungs became unhealthy and he therefore went to Italy. His inexperience at boating and being easily goaded by Arthur causes them all to drown.

Mary was the nurse of Joan and Peter. Once Oswald takes responsibility of the children, she subtly disappears from the story-line.

Mr. Sycamore is the family lawyer of Aunts Phyllis and Phoebe.

Muir is Oswald's trusted companion-explorer during his life in Africa; when it is verified that he can no longer return, Muir sends the rest of his possessions to England.

Miss Murgatroyd is the founder and a teacher at the School of St. George and the Venerable Bede. She stages plays with the help of the Sheldrick circle (see below), and bases her school on Pre-Raphaelite and aesthetic principles. John William Waterhouse and Walter Crane are two of the artists mentioned in her school.

Miss Mill is a teacher at the School of St. George and the Venerable Bede. She is trying to get a diploma at a London university, but she is incompetent at mathematics and literacy.

Unwin is the maid of Lady Charlotte, with whom the latter hypocritically has conversations with. She provides her with most of her "good" ideas; her sister, Mrs. Pybus, takes care of Joan when they send Peter to the High Cross Preparatory School.

Mr. Grimes is the lawyer of Lady Charlotte Sydenham.

Probyn was a pupil at the High Cross Preparatory School. He is the first to take an interest in Peter, but involuntarily causes him to be bullied by his yes-man, Newton. He enlists during the Great War as a bomb-slinger - his shocking appearance (long hair and painted face) and recklessness allows him to be worshipped by his fellow soldiers and feared by the Germans. He and two other Germans are eventually killed by the latter's machine-gun after he carelessly leads the enemy to English trenches.

Newton is a pupil at the High Cross Preparatory School. He bullies Peter; his fate during the Great War is unknown.

Ames is a pupil at the High Cross Preparatory School. He enlists during the Great War as a soldier, but loses the lower half of his leg after a month of service; when he meets Peter on the boat to England on the latter's first leave after his dogfight, he informs him that Probyn (see below) was killed as a bomb-slinger.

Mr. Mainwaring is the cruel headmaster of the High Cross Preparatory School. He, along with two other teachers, are incompetent teachers and make life difficult for Peter. He instructs that the students write falsely-enthusiastic letters to their guardians, and inflict severe punishments on misbehavior. When Peter escapes, he lets loose a sailing-boat and leaves his hat on it, making them believe that he has drowned.

Mr. Mackinder is an apologetic schoolmaster. Oswald meets him, in the hope of sending one of the children to his school, and is moved by his conversation on the futility of changing the school system to reflect current affairs.

== Themes ==
Joan and Peter develops a number of characteristically Wellsian themes.

=== The Unity of Humanity and Its Relation to the Universe ===
Joan and Peter concludes with an extended meditation by Oswald Sydenham in which he poses the problem of a collective human will, a notion that Wells would make one of the central themes of his history of humanity, The Outline of History. "Men . . . are wills and part of a will that is . . . paradoxically free and bound. . . . Where was this alleged will of the species? If there was indeed such a will in the species, why was there this war? And yet, whatever it might be, assuredly there was something greater than himself sustaining his life. l . . There was a light upon his life, and the truth was that he could not discover the source of the light nor define its nature; there was a presence in the world about him that made all life worth while, and yet it was Nameless and Incomprehensible. It was the Essence beyond Reality; it was the Heart of All Things." After having published God the Invisible King the year before, in Joan and Peter Wells was in the process of pulling back from his theistic stance, but here he still presents religion among a number of equivalent symbols for the relation of humanity to the cosmos.

At the same time, Oswald is haunted by a nightmare in which this belief is denied and humanity is doomed: "It was the idea of a dark forest. And of an endless effort to escape from it. He was one of the captains of a vaguely conceived expedition that was lost in an interminable wilderness of shadows . . . and this forest which was Life, held him back; it held him with its darkness, it snared him with slime and marshy pitfalls, it entangled him admidst pools and channels of black and blood-red stinking water . . . Then far off through the straight bars of the tree stems a light shone, and a great hope sprang up in him. And then the light became red . . . and he realised that the forest had caught fire."

While recuperating from his combat wounds, Peter has a rather Kafkaesque dream of God as a "Great Experimenter" who reproaches him with not sufficiently exerting himself to realize his ideals. Human beings should not complain to God about the world, the Lord God explains, but "change it." As a result of this vision and of an encounter with an enlightened Indian, Peter "clearly decided to become personally responsible for the reconstruction of the British Empire."

=== Education ===
Joan and Peter is an indictment of "the educational stagnation of England during those crucial years before the Great War," and England's suffering in the war is attributed directly to this.

Wells devotes a section to an "Apology of the Schoolmaster," in which Mr. Mackinder, the headmaster of White Court, explains the constraints that prevent schoolmasters from making ideal schools: "I had to be what was required of me."

=== England's Need to Get Free of the "Anglican System" ===
Lady Charlotte Sydenham represents the sclerosis of Anglicanism, which in Wells's mind stands high among the causes of Britains' ills. "The curious student of the history of England in the decade before the Great War will find the clew to what must otherwise seem a hopeless tangle in the steady, disingenuous, mischievous antagonism of the Old Anglican system to every kind of change that might bring nearer the dreaded processes of modernisation."

=== The British Empire as a Trustee for the Incipient World State ===
Both Oswald and Peter become advocates for this Wellsian hope.

== Redaction and publication ==
Joan and Peter was written in 1917.

== Reception ==
Joan and Peter was "well received by [Wells's] friends, but less so by outside reviewers"; Virginia Woolf, for example, judged it to be too didactic to be successful fiction. However, she did grant the book "continuity and vitality" and praised Wells's ability to constitute a "whole world." Thomas Hardy praised the book and read it aloud to his wife in the evening.
