= New Worlds for Old (Wells book) =

1908 book by H. G. Wells

- First Edition Cover
- Author: H. G. Wells
- Language: English
- Genre: Nonfiction
- Publisher: Macmillan
- Publication date: March 1908
- Publication place: United Kingdom
- Media type: Print (Hardback)
- Pages: 333

New Worlds for Old (1908), which appeared in some later editions with the subtitle "A Plain Account of Modern Socialism," was one of several books and pamphlets that H. G. Wells wrote about the socialist future in the period 1901–1908, while he was engaged in an effort to reform the Fabian Society.

== Background ==
As a result of Wells's earlier books and articles, he was "bombarded with requests for pieces on socialism." Many of the chapters of New Worlds for Old are reworked versions of these pieces. He told an American publisher that his intended audience was intelligent young people, especially those living in the United States.

== Argument ==
New Worlds for Old identifies two "Main Generalizations of Socialism": (1) "The ideas of the private individual rights of the parent and of his isolated responsibility for his children are harmfully exaggerated in the contemporary world." (2) "The idea of the private ownership of things and the rights of owners is enormously and mischievously exaggerated in the contemporary world."

Wells advocates the replacement of a "social system, based on Private Ownership" with one based on the "spirit of service," arguing that this will be more productive as well as more just. He devotes several chapters to addressing objections to socialism, then analyzes the history of socialism.

Wells places the origins of socialism in "a disconnected series of protests against the extreme theories of Individualism and Individualist Political Economy" and notes that the word dates from 1835; in its initial phase, he says, it was "immediately revolutionary" and teemed with "rash, suggestive schemes." This early phase was ended by Karl Marx, who, influenced by evolutionary thinking, "for the first time viewed our age of individualist industrial development, not as a possible permanent condition of humanity, but as something unstable and in motion, as an economic process." But Wells rejects the "revolutionary socialism" of Marx as flawed by an exaggeration of the economic factor, an invidious concept of class warfare, and an excessive determinism. In a following chapter, he criticizes the "administration socialism" of which the Fabians are an example, as excessively bureaucratic in spirit. The label Wells gives to what he advocates is "constructive socialism," which is to be realized "through the operation of a collective mind that must by its nature be constructive and enterprising, because only through the creation of such a mind can Socialism be brought about."

For Wells, socialism is more in the nature of a religion than a political movement. Near the end of New Worlds for Old, he writes: "Socialism is a moral and intellectual process, let me in conclusion reiterate that. Only secondarily and incidentally does it sway the world of politics. It is not a political movement; it may engender political movements, but it can never become a political movement; any political body, any organization whatever, that professes to stand for Socialism, makes an altogether too presumptuous claim. . . . There can be no pontifical Socialism; the theory lives and grows. It springs out of the common sanity of mankind."

== Reception ==
New Worlds for Old was very successful, and went through many editions; it was reprinted five times over the next six years and later went through two revisions. Leopold Bloom cites it in the "Night Town" section of James Joyce's Ulysses. The book influenced an entire generation of British socialists. It was praised by William Archer, John Galsworthy, Ray Lankester, Joseph Conrad, and many others; in a review, Arnold Bennett called it a masterly work. Helen Keller listed New Worlds for Old as the book that made her become a socialist.
