= The Work, Wealth and Happiness of Mankind =

1932 book by H. G. Wells

- First edition (UK)
- Author: H. G. Wells
- Language: English
- Genre: Political economy
- Publisher: William Heinemann (UK); Doubleday, Doran (US)
- Publication date: 1932
- Pages: 850

The Work, Wealth and Happiness of Mankind by H. G. Wells is the final work of a trilogy of which the first volumes were The Outline of History (1919–1920) and The Science of Life (1929). Wells conceived of the three parts of his trilogy as, respectively, "a survey of history, of the science of life, and of existing conditions." Intended as an unprecedented "picture of all mankind to-day" in all its manifold activities, he called it "the least finished work . . . because it is the most novel." He hoped the volumes would play a role in the open conspiracy to establish a progressive world government that he had been promoting since the mid-1920s.

== Genesis and reception ==
Wells had great difficulty devising a comprehensive book discussing the world's economic life from a psychological point of view. The Work, Wealth and Happiness of Mankind had at various times more than a dozen working titles (such as The Anatomy of Money). As in The Science of Life, Wells worked with collaborators. Hugh P. Vowles and Edmund Cressey agreed to work with him on the book in 1928, but Vowles's work did not satisfy Wells. A bitter wrangle ensued in which the Society of Authors became involved, to Wells's chagrin. In early 1929 he overcame the discouragement these difficulties caused and resumed work on the book, with the help of Amber Reeves on the sections on money and economics and of Alexander Carr-Saunders on demography. Odette Keun, Wells's lover from 1924 to 1933, served as the work's general editor. Graham Wallas also offered substantial assistance.

The Work, Wealth and Happiness of Mankind sold relatively well (17,000 copies in England in the first month alone). But the Great Depression restrained sales and Wells's optimistic utopianism struck many as passé and naïve in the increasingly violent political climate of the 1930s. When published in the United States in 1936, the book was retitled The Outline of Man's Work and Wealth.

== Organization of work ==
The Work, Wealth and Happiness of Mankind is divided into sixteen chapters following an introduction explaining the work's conception. The historical development of human mastery over matter and energy occupies Chapters 1–3. Chapter 4 is on agriculture, Chapter 5 on clothing and shelter. Chapter 6 describes the distribution of goods and Chapter 7 the organisation of work. Chapter 8 offers an original analysis of the psychology of work. Chapters 9 and 10 analyse money, finance, and economic inequality. Chapter 11 is devoted to the social and economic role of women. Chapter 12 depicts government and the military. Chapter 13 discusses the problem of races, rejecting segregation, racism, and eugenics. Chapter 14 discusses sport, art, and entertainment. Chapter 15 analyses problems of religion, education, and social discipline. Chapter 16 addresses the future prospects of humanity.

Two historical figures are praised near the beginning and the end of The Work, Wealth and Happiness of Mankind because they seem to Wells to be essentially linked to his enterprise: Roger Bacon, a precursor of the Enlightenment, and Denis Diderot, the first writer to envision the possibilities of modern encyclopaedias.

== Overarching themes ==
=== Economics is grounded in biology and psychology ===
Humans are "economic animals" because they prepare and store food socially. This important development occurred in the Pleistocene, when man "became very rapidly indeed an unprecedented species." For Wells, the adaptation of the "very imperfect instrument" of the human mind to new and developing possibilities is the essence of humanity's economic problem.

=== Satisfying the demands of the persona is the fundamental human enterprise ===
Wells endorses Jung's concept of the persona, which he regards as susceptible of education. "Beneath the material processes of economics lies the social idea; its driving force is will. The clearer the idea, the better organized the will in the personas of our species, the more hopeful and successful the working of the human ant-hill."

Wells proposes that there are three fundamental types of persona that differ in many ways, but in particular in their attitude toward property: (1) the peasant; (2) the nomad; (3) the priest. "The first type is acquisitive, tenacious, and preservative; the second is rapacious and consumes; the third professes to be more or less aloof from possession and gain, and to carry on the service of the community for satisfaction of a quite different type." Wells seriously entertains the proposal of Frederick Soddy that the "money manipulator" may be "a new type whose primary delight is domination and oppression through relative gain" but concludes that if this is so, "the conception pervading this book . . . is unsound" and "[t]here is nothing for it but . . . a class war against the rich and the able . . . and beginning again upon a different ground plan, with whatever hope is left to us, amidst the ruins."

=== The stupidity of contemporary political institutions ===
Wells's treatment of contemporary political institutions is aggressively satirical, but he attributes their shortcomings to their need to accommodate the biological heritage human beings have inherited to solve the problem of what he calls "assent," or legitimation.

=== The importance of education ===
What hope Wells has for the prospects of humanity rests primarily on human educability. "Every human being is to some extent an educable creature." Religion's social role has been to a large degree educational; moreover, "[e]ducation has been the last field of intellectual activity to pass out of religious control, and it is still imperfectly and doubtfully released." Wells has doubts about the role played by universities, attached as they are to religious institutions and wealthy interests. But he has high hopes for extra-scholastic education, including newspapers, literature, and encyclopaedias. Ultimately he hopes for "a recasting of [the world's] schools to meet the needs of a new education," helped or controlled by "a world government."

== Translations ==
The book was translated in German in 1932, with the title Arbeit, Wohlstand und das Glück der Menschheit.
