= God the Invisible King =

1917 theological tract by H. G. Wells

- Title page for God the Invisible King (1st American edition, 1917)
- Author: H. G. Wells
- Language: English
- Genre: Theology
- Publisher: Cassell and Company (UK); The Macmillan Company (US)
- Publication date: May 1917
- Publication place: London, United Kingdom; New York City, New York, United States
- Media type: Print (hardback)
- Pages: 206
- OCLC: 1123727467

God the Invisible King is a theological tract published by H. G. Wells in May 1917.

== Argument ==
Wells describes his aim as to state "as forcibly and exactly as possible the religious belief of the writer." He distinguishes his religious beliefs from Christianity, and warns readers that he is "particularly uncompromising" on the doctrine of the Trinity, which he blames on "the violent ultimate crystallization of Nicaea." He pleads for a "modern religion" or "renascent religion" that has "no revelation and no founder."

Wells rejects any belief related to God as Nature or the Creator, confining himself to the "finite" God "of the human heart." He devotes a chapter to misconceptions about God that are due to mistaken "mental elaboration" as opposed to "heresies of speculation," and says that the God in which he believes has nothing to do with magic, providence, quietism, punishment, the threatening of children, or sexual ethics. Positively, in a chapter entitled "The Likeness of God," he states his belief that God is courage, a person, youth (i.e. forward- rather than backward-looking), and love.

Wells finds in scientific atheists like Metchnikoff beliefs that are equivalent to what he regards as "the fundamental proposition of religious translated into terms of materialistic science, the proposition that damnation is really over-individuation and that salvation is escape from self into the larger being of life."

In God the Invisible King, Wells regards belief in God as welling up from within the individual: "if you do not feel God then there is no persuading you of him; we cannot win over the incredulous." The book argues that God seeks "the conquest of death," through a struggle to "transform the world into a theocracy" that he regards as "more and more manifestly the real future of mankind," not through suffering or non-resistance. Sin is seen not as bad conduct but as the product of disharmonies of "the inner being" that "snatch us away from our devotion to God's service" and such weaknesses "cannot damn a man once he has found God."

A final seventh chapter rejects the idea that "the new religion" can or should be organised into a church: "Whatever religious congregations men may form henceforth in the name of the true God must be for their own sakes and not to take charge of religion." In a section titled "The State Is God's Instrument," Wells speaks of a coming "theocracy" and argues that in the probably not too distant future "Religion which is free, speaking freely through whom it will, subject to a perpetual unlimited criticism, will be the life and driving power of the whole organised world. So that if you prefer not to say that there will be no church, if you choose rather to declare that the world-state is God's church, you may have it so if you will."

In an "envoy," Wells invokes "my friend and master, that very great American, the late William James," as one who shared his conception of God. He asserts that "modern religion" is "a process of truth, guided by the divinity in men. It needs no other guidance, and no protection. It needs nothing but freedom, free speech, and honest statement."

== Background ==
Biographers (including Wells himself) agree in regarding this foray into theology, which is also remarkable in the novel Mr. Britling Sees It Through (1916), as the result of the trauma of World War I.

God the Invisible King "was so different from what Wells normally wrote that most people did not know how to handle it." The book led to Wells having lunch with the Archbishop of Canterbury, and provoked a number of works controverting his statement of his beliefs.

Wells later repudiated the God of God the Invisible King as "no God at all." "What we have here is really a falling back of the mind towards immaturity under the stress of dismay and anxiety. . . . I thought it was pitiful that [men looking for some lodestar for their loyalty] should pin their minds to 'King and Country' and suchlike claptrap, when they might live and die for greater ends, and I did my utmost to personify and animate a greater, remoter objective in God the Invisible King. So by a sort of coup d'état I turned my New Republic for a time into a divine monarchy." "In What Are We to Do with Our Lives? (1932) I make the most explicit renunciation and apology for this phase of terminological disingenuousness."
