= The Country of the Blind and Other Stories =

Short story collection by H. G. Wells

- First edition
- Author: H. G. Wells
- Language: English
- Genre: Science fiction, fantasy
- Published: 1911 (Thomas Nelson and Sons)
- Publication place: United Kingdom
- Media type: Print (hardback)
- Pages: 574

The Country of the Blind and Other Stories is a collection of thirty-three fantasy and science fiction short stories written by the English author H. G. Wells between 1894 and 1909. It was first published by Thomas Nelson and Sons in 1911. All the stories had first been published in various weekly and monthly periodicals. Twenty-seven of the stories had also been previously published in five earlier story collections by Wells.

The title of this collection refers to one of Wells's best-known short stories, "The Country of the Blind", which is included in this book.

== Introduction ==
In his introduction to this book, Wells wrote that this collection covers "all the short stories by me that I care for any one to read again." He went on to say that except for the two sets of linked stories "A Story of the Stone Age" and "A Story of the Days To Come" in his earlier collection, Tales of Space and Time (1899), "no short story of mine of the slightest merit is excluded from this volume."

== Contents ==
These are the short stories contained in this collection showing the periodicals in which they were first published.

- "The Jilting of Jane" (Pall Mall Budget, 12 July 1894) ^{2} ^{3}
- "The Cone" (Unicorn, 18 September 1895) ^{2} ^{3}
- "The Stolen Bacillus" (Pall Mall Budget, 21 June 1894) ^{1} ^{3}
- "The Flowering of the Strange Orchid" (Pall Mall Budget, 2 August 1894) ^{1}
- "In the Avu Observatory" (Pall Mall Budget, 9 August 1894) ^{1} ^{3}
- "Æpyornis Island" (Pall Mall Budget, 27 December 1894) ^{1} ^{3}
- "The Remarkable Case of Davidson's Eyes" (Pall Mall Budget, 28 March 1895) ^{1}
- "The Lord of the Dynamos" (Pall Mall Budget, 6 September 1894) ^{1} ^{3}
- "The Moth" (Pall Mall Gazette, 28 March 1895) ^{1} ^{3}
- "The Treasure in the Forest" (Pall Mall Budget, 23 August 1894) ^{1} ^{3}
- "The Story of the Late Mr. Elvesham" (The Idler, May 1896) ^{2} ^{3}
- "Under the Knife" (The New Review, January 1896) ^{2}
- "The Sea Raiders" (The Weekly Sun Literary Supplement, 6 December 1896) ^{2} ^{3}
- "The Obliterated Man" (New Budget, 15 August 1895 as "The Sad Story of a Dramatic Critic") ^{2} ^{3}
- "The Plattner Story" (The New Review, April 1896) ^{2} ^{3}
- "The Red Room" (The Idler, March 1896) ^{2} ^{3}
- "The Purple Pileus" (Black and White, December 1896) ^{2} ^{3}
- "A Slip Under the Microscope" (The Yellow Book, January 1896) ^{2} ^{3}
- "The Crystal Egg" (The New Review, May 1897) ^{4}
- "The Star" (The Graphic, December 1897) ^{4}
- "The Man Who Could Work Miracles" (The Illustrated London News, July 1898) ^{4}
- "A Vision of Judgment" (Butterfly, September 1899)
- "Jimmy Goggles the God" (The Graphic, December 1898) ^{5}
- "Miss Winchelsea's Heart" (The Queen, October 1898) ^{5}
- "A Dream of Armageddon" (Black and White, May/June 1901) ^{5}
- "The Valley of Spiders" (Pearson's Magazine, March 1903) ^{5}
- "The New Accelerator" (The Strand, December 1901) ^{5}
- "The Truth About Pyecraft" (The Strand, April 1903) ^{5}
- "The Magic Shop" (The Strand, June 1903) ^{5}
- "The Empire of the Ants" (The Strand, December 1905)
- "The Door in the Wall" (The Daily Chronicle, 14 July 1906)
- "The Country of the Blind" (The Strand, April 1904)
- "The Beautiful Suit" (Colliers, 10 April 1909)

=== Previous collections ===
Many of the above stories were previously published in the following story collections by Wells.

- The Stolen Bacillus and Other Incidents (1895)
- The Plattner Story and Others (1897)
- Thirty Strange Stories (1897)
- Tales of Space and Time (1899)
- Twelve Stories and a Dream (1903)
