= The Door in the Wall =

The Door in the Wall may refer to:

- "The Door in the Wall" (short story) by H. G. Wells
- The Door in the Wall and Other Stories, a 1911 short story collection by H. G. Wells
- The Door in the Wall (novel) (1949) by Marguerite de Angeli
- "The Door in the Wall", a 1965 collection of short stories by Oliver La Farge.
