= Cephalopods in popular culture =

Popular depictions of the class Cephalopoda

The NROL-39 mission patch, depicting the National Reconnaissance Office as an octopus with a long reach

Cephalopods, usually specifically octopuses, squids, nautiluses and cuttlefishes, are most commonly represented in popular culture in the Western world as creatures that spray ink and use their tentacles to persistently grasp at and hold onto objects or living creatures.

The octopus (or kraken, a legendary sea creature sometimes depicted as a giant octopus) has been used as a negative metaphor for an entity which is perceived as sending out many "tentacles" from one "head" in order to exert power and control.

== Cartoons ==
The first cephalopod character to play a title role in an American animated cartoon series was the Hanna-Barbera character Squiddly Diddly. The animated series Oswald revolves around the life of the titular blue octopus and his friends. Cephalopods more commonly appear as supporting characters, or make guest appearances. Supporting characters in cartoons include Occy, a pet octopus in Snorks, the Maximals Scuba and Ikad along with the Seacon Space Pirate Scylla from Beast Wars II, and Squidward Tentacles, an octopus from the Nickelodeon series SpongeBob SquarePants; Squilliam Fancyson is an octopus from the same cartoon. Numerous cephalopods have made cameo appearances in the cartoon series Octonauts. The character Eight-Armed Willy from the animated series The Marvelous Misadventures of Flapjack is another example of a cephalopod cameo. In an episode of the animated series The Adventures of Jimmy Neutron: Boy Genius, entitled "Nightmare in Retroville", Jimmy Neutron transforms himself into an octopus-like creature to battle his friends, who have similarly been transformed into monsters.

== Comics ==
Doctor Octopus and Lady Octopus are two supervillains from the Marvel Comics universe. The former was a scientist who augmented his human body by adding four back-mounted mechanical arms (bringing his total number of limbs to eight). Another villain is Zitzbath Zark, otherwise known as the Octopus, from the hardboiled comic Spirit. The DC Comics hero Aquaman had a pet octopus named Topo who assisted him in a variety of ways, often taking advantage of his multiple limbs. The Space Squids are frequent enemies of Earthmen in Brewster Rockit: Space Guy!.

== Film ==
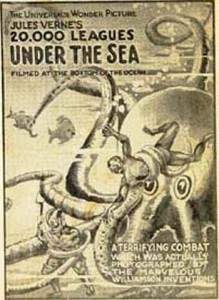
20,000 Leagues under the sea (1916)

20,000 Leagues Under the Sea, based on the 1870 novel Twenty Thousand Leagues Under the Seas by Jules Verne, is the best known representation of a giant cephalopod in cinema. The story's plot follows a group of humans who travel in a submarine called Nautilus (another cephalopod reference) and encounter a giant cephalopod. At least five film adaptions of the story exist (1907, 1916, 1954, 1985 and 1997), variously presenting the monster as a squid or an octopus, or a fantastic combination of the two.

Other films which feature giant cephalopods include It Came from Beneath the Sea (1955), Voyage to the Bottom of the Sea (1961), Space Amoeba (1970), Tentacles (1977), Warlords of Atlantis (1978), Octopus (2000), Octopus 2: River of Fear (2001) Kraken: Tentacles of the Deep (2006) Mega Shark Versus Giant Octopus (2009) and Arrival (2016). The Beast (1996) and Deep Rising (1998) both feature squid.

Octopuses have also been depicted in cinema as hybrids, such as in Octaman, which features a mutant humanoid octopus. In the Disney animated movie The Little Mermaid, Ursula (the sea witch) is depicted as a human-octopus hybrid with the torso of a woman and the arms of an octopus in place of her legs. Monster Shark (1984) and Sharktopus (2010) feature fish-octopus hybrids.

Cephalopods have been depicted in animated feature films for family audiences. Finding Nemo (2003) includes a flapjack octopus among its cast of aquatic characters. The sequel Finding Dory features an East Pacific red octopus as a major supporting character. Toy Story 3 (2010) features a toy rubber octopus named Stretch (voiced by Whoopi Goldberg) and Shark Tale (2004) features an octopus named Luca (voiced by Vincent Pastore). An octopus named Dave (voiced by John Malkovich) is the main antagonist in the 2014 Penguins of Madagascar movie. The Australian animated film Dot and the Whale (1986) features a giant octopus with magical powers.

Cuttlefish and their unique attributes have been a recurring topic or plot point in several major films. Captain Jack Sparrow asked feuding pirates to consider the cuttlefish and their capacity for cannibalism in Pirates of the Caribbean: At World's End (2007). Cuttlefish and their hypnotic strobing ability were discussed as the greatest fear of Ulysses Klaue in Marvel Studios' Avengers: Age of Ultron (2015). In the same year, the DNA of cuttlefish were discussed as contributing to the intelligence and camouflage of the Indominus rex in the science fiction action film Jurassic World (2015).

== Literature ==
Cthulhu is a fictional deity created by H. P. Lovecraft and first appearing in the short story "The Call of Cthulhu", published in the pulp magazine Weird Tales in February 1928. Cthulhu is portrayed as a malevolent and powerful being that, though for the most part incomprehensible to human understanding, appears to have features reminiscent of an octopus and a dragon. Cthulhu appeared in the three-episode arc of the series South Park that began with the episode "Coon 2: Hindsight".

Other examples of cephalopods in literature include the man-eating squid species Haploteuthis ferox from H. G. Wells' short story "The Sea Raiders". In the Harry Potter franchise, a benevolent giant squid lives in the Black Lake, located next to Hogwarts. The Norwegian science fiction novel De heldige tre konger features intelligent cephalopods that occupy the land. In Thomas Pynchon's novel Gravity's Rainbow, octopus Grigori is trained through Pavlovian conditioning to attack the double agent Katje Borgesius.

== Music ==
The Beatles song "Octopus's Garden", the Syd Barrett song "Octopus", the Bloc Party song "Octopus", and the Salmonella Dub song "Octopus" all incorporate octopuses in their song titles or lyrics. The song "Giant Squids" by Australian musician Baterz speculates about the lives of the animals. The Australian band Do-Re-Mi wrote and recorded a song called "Cuttlefish Beach", which appears on the album Domestic Harmony. The Australian children's musical group The Wiggles features an octopus as one of their mascots.

=== Electronic music ===
Several musicians, producers and composers of electronic music have names inspired by cephalopods. These include the chip-tune composer Cuttlefish, and the electronic music producers, Tron Sepia (whose name refers to a genus of cuttlefish). Cephalopods are reflected in track titles and the names of several record labels, including Octopus Records, Octopus Black Label, Black Octopus Sound, Squid and the Stereo, Siamese Squids, and Nautilus Recordz. As of December 2023, Beatport's electronic music catalog includes over 150 releases which include the word "octopus" in their title. Other titles with references to cephalopods include the Spenghead tracks "Gargantuan Cuttlefish Liasons" and "Romancing the Collossal Squid"; the latter appears on an EP entitled The Cephalopod.

== Video games ==
In the Mario franchise, a Blooper is an enemy character resembling a squid, debuting in Super Mario Bros. (1985). In the sandbox game Minecraft, squids are passive, non-playable characters that carry obtainable ink sacs. In the media franchise Pokémon, Omanyte, Omastar, Octillery, Inkay, Malamar, Clobbopus and Grapploct are all cephalopod-like organisms. Splatoon, a game by Nintendo released in 2015, features squid-like humanoids called Inklings as the player characters. The 2017 sequel Splatoon 2 introduced Octolings, playable octopus-like humanoids as part of the Octo Expansion DLC. Night of the Cephalopods (2008) is a free retro pixel art survival game in which human players must fend off levitating cephalopods. A discussion thread on TONMO.com is dedicated to noting appearances of cephalopod characters in video games.

In Galactopus, a homebrew action game for the Atari 2600, the player pilots a spaceship and battles cephalopods in space.

== Erotica ==
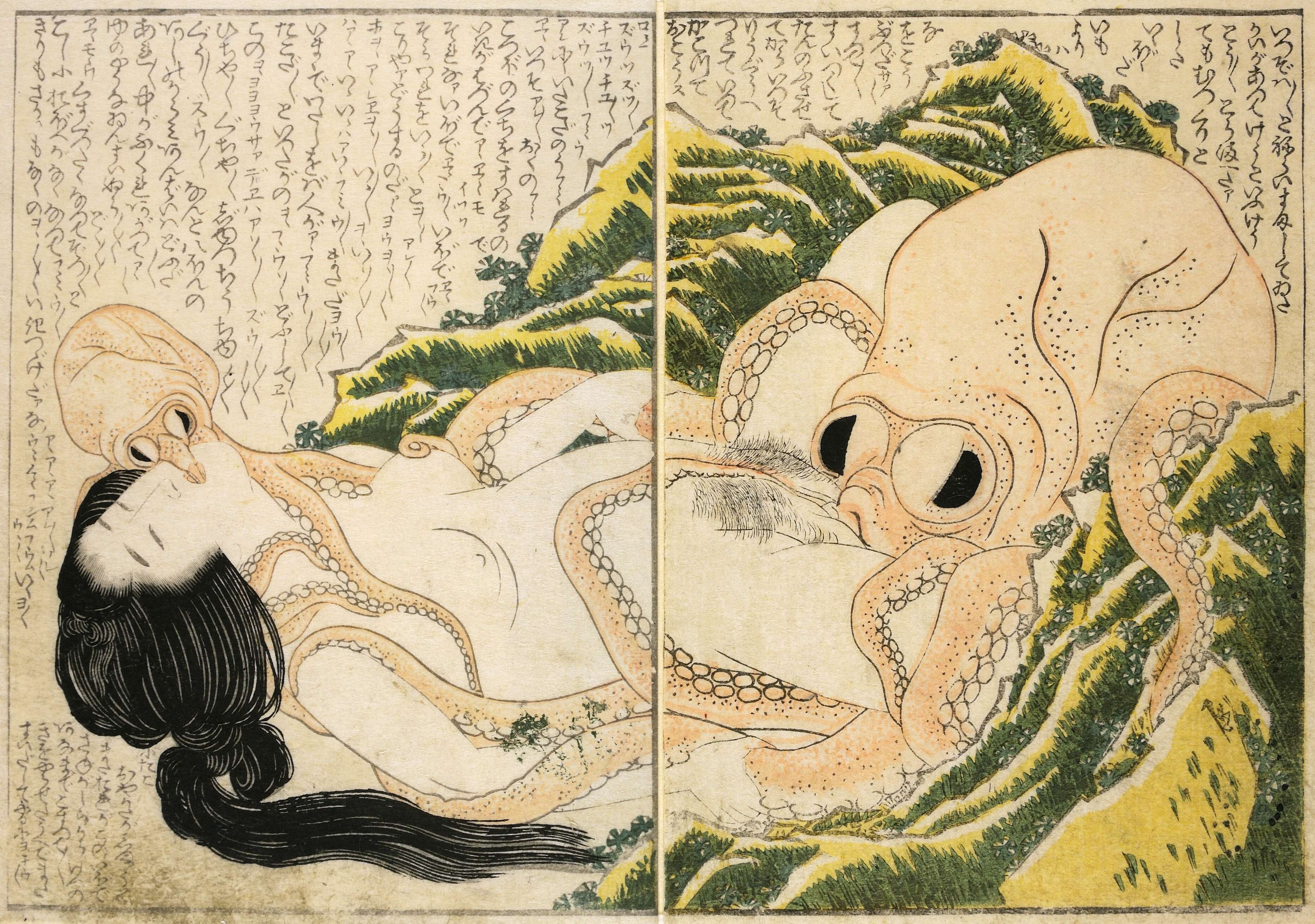
The Dream of the Fisherman's Wife (1814) by Hokusai depicts a woman having sex with two octopuses.

Tentacle erotica (Japanese: 触手責め, Hepburn: shokushu zeme; lit. 'tentacle attack') is a type of erotica most commonly found in Japan that integrates traditional pornography with elements of bestiality, fantasy, horror, and science fiction. It is found in some horror or hentai titles, with tentacled creatures (usually fictional monsters) having sexual intercourse, predominantly with females or, to a lesser extent, males. Tentacle erotica can be consensual but mostly contains elements of rape.

The genre is well known enough in Japan that it is the subject of parody. In the 21st century, Japanese films of this genre have become recognized in the United States and Europe, although it remains a small, fetish-oriented part of the adult film industry. While most tentacle erotica is animated, there are also a few live-action films that depict it. (Full article...)

== Currency ==
In Timor-Leste, the smallest denomination coin (1 centavo) has a nautilus on its reverse. Iceland 10 aurar coins had a squid on the reverse (discontinued in 2004).

== Other appearances ==
Paul the Octopus was an octopus that correctly predicted the outcomes of eleven out of thirteen football matches from the UEFA Euro 2008 Championship and the 2010 FIFA World Cup. Al the Octopus is the mascot of the Detroit Red Wings.

Ninomae Ina'nis, a VTuber affiliated with Hololive Production, can control tentacles in her lore and looks octopus-like, especially sharing flaps with the dumbo octopus.

== See also ==
- Giant squid in popular culture
