= Tales of Space and Time =

Collection written by H. G. Wells

- Cover of the first edition
- Author: H. G. Wells
- Language: English
- Genre: Science fiction, fantasy
- Publisher: Doubleday & McClure Co.
- Publication date: 1899
- Publication place: New York City, New York, U.S.A.
- Media type: Print (hardback)
- Pages: 358
- OCLC: 639626

Tales of Space and Time is a fantasy and science fiction collection of three short stories and two novellas written by the English author H. G. Wells between 1897 and 1898. It was first published by Doubleday & McClure Co. in 1899. All the stories had first been published in various monthly periodicals and this was the first volume to collect these stories.

== Contents ==
These are the stories contained in this collection showing the periodicals in which they were first published.

- "The Crystal Egg" (short story, The New Review, May 1897)
- "The Star" (short story, The Graphic, December 1897)
- "A Story of the Stone Age" (novella, The Idler, May–September 1897) comprising:
  - "Ugh-Lomi and Uya"
  - "The Cave Bear"
  - "The First Horseman"
  - "Uya the Lion"
  - "The Fight in the Lion’s Thicket"
- "A Story of the Days to Come" (novella, The Pall Mall Magazine, June–October 1899) comprising:
  - "The Cure for Love"
  - "The Vacant Country"
  - "The Ways of the City"
  - "Underneath"
  - "Bindon Intervenes"
- "The Man Who Could Work Miracles" (short story, Illustrated London News, July 1898)
