= The Plattner Story and Others =

- First edition
- Author: H. G. Wells
- Language: English
- Genre: Science fiction, fantasy
- Published: 1897 (Methuen & Co.)
- Publication place: United Kingdom
- Media type: Print (hardback)
- Pages: 301

The Plattner Story and Others is a collection of seventeen short stories written by H. G. Wells. This volume was first published in March 1897 by Methuen & Co.

== Stories collected ==
- "The Plattner Story" (New Review, April 1896)
- "The Argonauts of the Air" (Phil May's Annual, December 1895)
- "The Story of the Late Mr. Elvesham" (The Idler, May 1896)
- "In the Abyss" (Pearson's Magazine, August 1896)
- "The Apple" (The Idler, October 1896)
- "Under the Knife" (The New Review, January 1896)
- "The Sea Raiders" (The Weekly Sun Literary Supplement, December 1896)
- "Pollock and the Porroh Man" (New Budget, May 1895)
- "The Red Room" (The Idler, March 1896)
- "The Cone" (Unicorn, 1895)
- "The Purple Pileus" (Black and White, Christmas Number 1896)
- "The Jilting of Jane" (first published in this collection)
- "In the Modern Vein" (first published as "A Bardlet's Romance", Truth, March 1894)
- "A Catastrophe" (New Budget, April 1895)
- "The Lost Inheritance" (first published in this collection)
- "The Sad Story of a Dramatic Critic" (New Budget, August 1895)
- "A Slip Under the Microscope" (The Yellow Book, January 1896)

== See also ==
- H. G. Wells bibliography
