= Giant squid in popular culture =

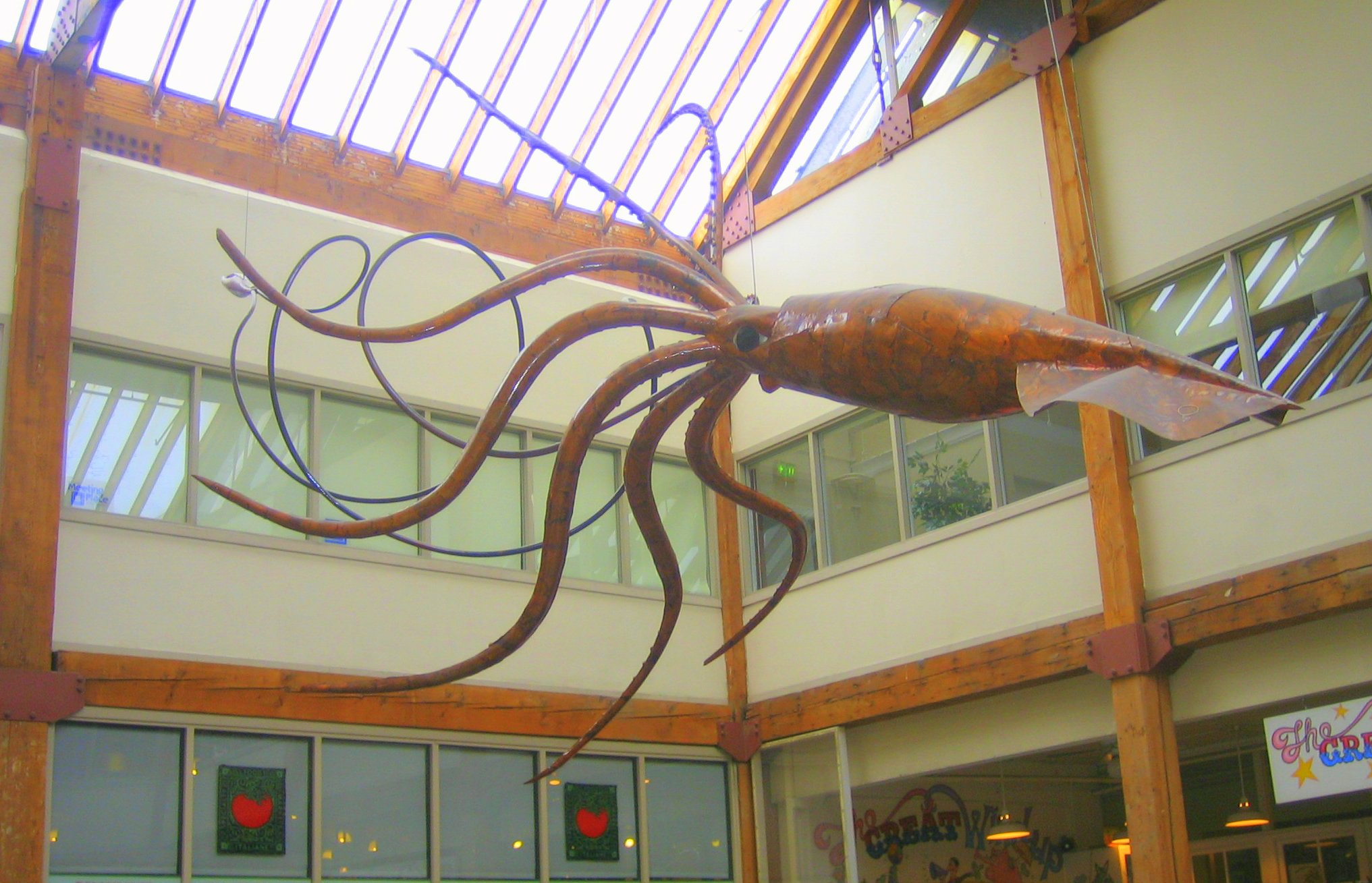
Giant squid sculpture in Seattle, Washington, United States

The giant squid's elusive nature and fearsome appearance have long made it a popular subject of legends and folk tales. Its popularity as an image continues today with references and depictions in literature, film, television, and video games.

Often, the giant squid is represented as being in dramatic, evenly matched combat with a sperm whale. However, this powerful image is no longer considered accurate given the evidence that exists for a simpler predator-prey relationship between whale and squid, with the whale being the predator and the squid the prey, though sucker scars have been seen on sperm whale skin.

== Books and comics ==
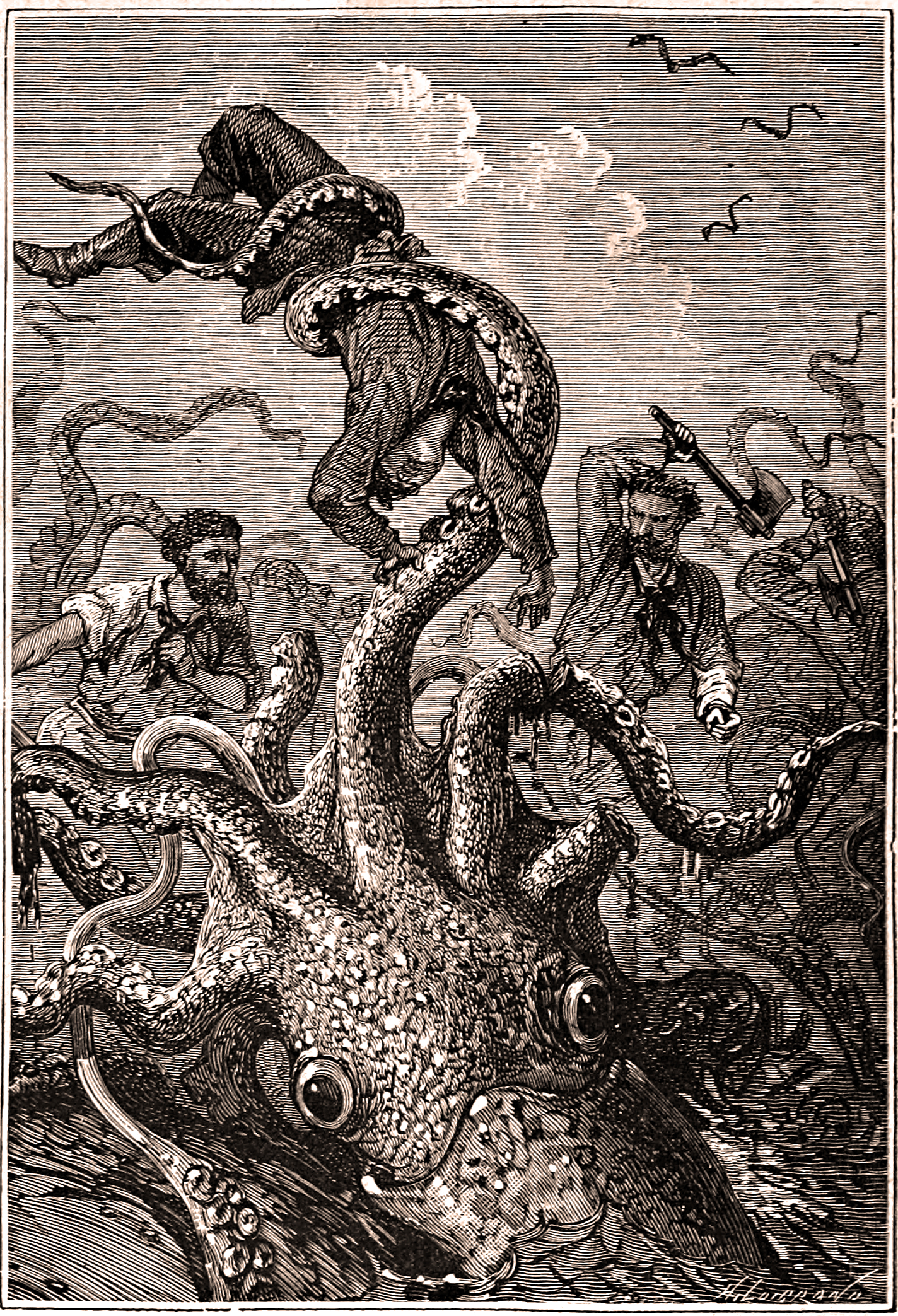
An illustration from the original edition of Jules Verne's 1870 novel Twenty Thousand Leagues Under the Seas depicting a giant squid.

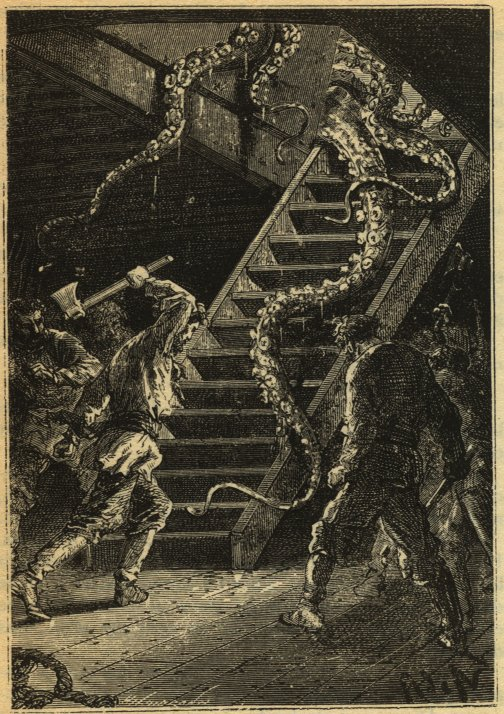
Fighting the squid on the Nautilus.

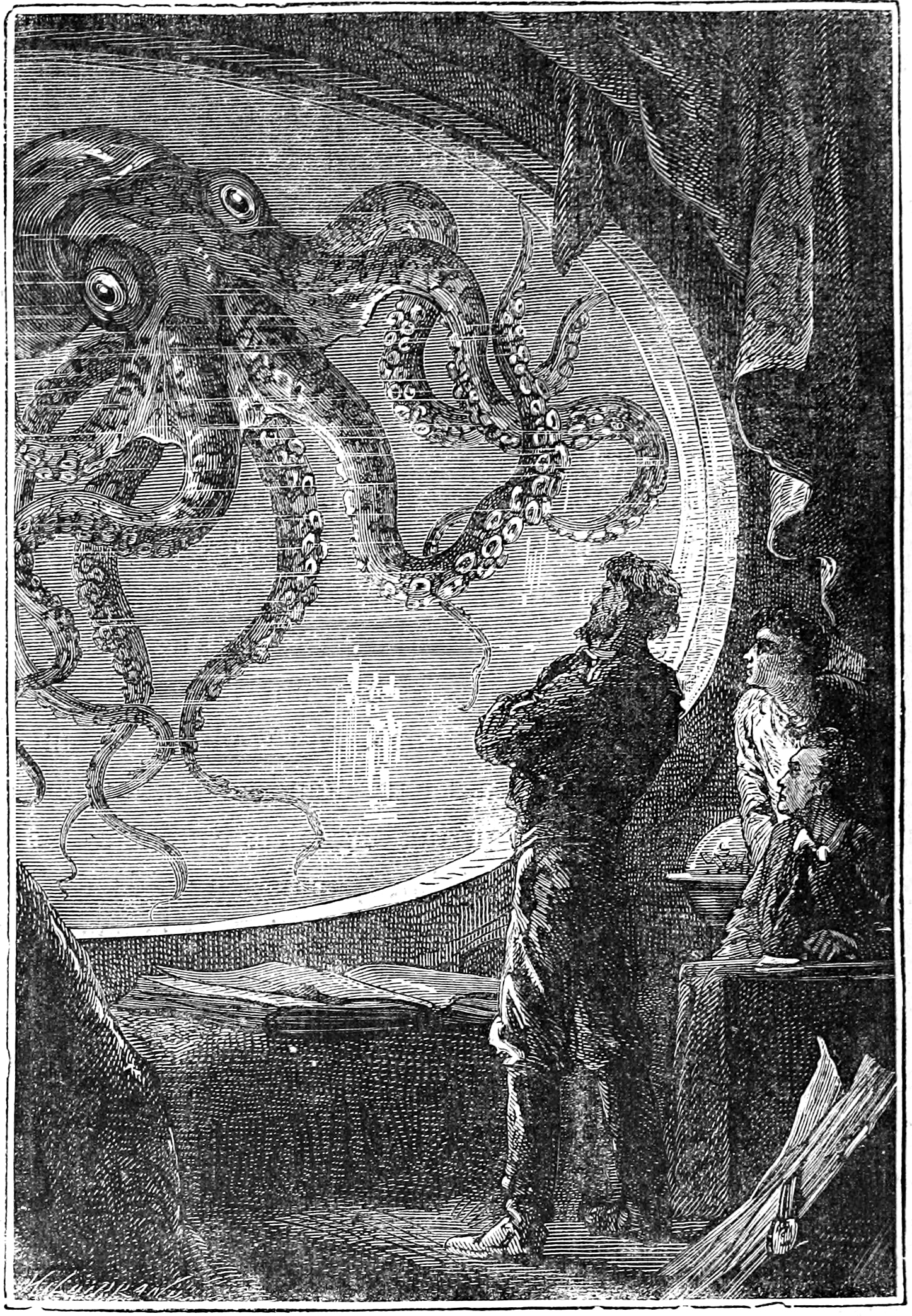
Captain Nemo viewing a giant squid from a porthole.

(Alphabetical by author)

- In Book 27 (The Exposed) of K. A. Applegate's Animorphs book series, Rachel and Tobias morph into sperm whales to find a giant squid, with the rest of the group morphing into squid to find the Pemalite ship hidden on the ocean floor.
- Peter Benchley's novel Beast and its television film adaptation feature a giant squid terrorizing Bermuda.
- The Lost Symbol by Dan Brown includes the body of a giant squid kept in storage at the Smithsonian Institution.
- Arthur C. Clarke used giant squid in many of his works. In The Deep Range, a squid of exaggerated size is captured and exhibited. In the short story "Big Game Hunt", a device capable of controlling the behavior of invertebrates is used in an attempt to capture and film a giant squid. In Childhood's End, one of the characters stows away on an alien spacecraft by hiding inside a model of a giant squid battling a whale.
- A giant squid is a key player in Michael Crichton's novel Sphere, as well as in the film version.
- James Bond fights a giant squid in Ian Fleming's book, Dr. No. The scene is absent from the film adaption.
- A giant squid is mentioned in the book Andrew Lost in the Deep by J. C. Greenburg.
- The 2023 novel Whalefall by Daniel Kraus details a teenage scuba diver who encounters a giant squid being chased by a large bull sperm whale while diving off the coast of Monterey, California. The diver is ensnared by the squid and swallowed along with it when the whale appears to capture its prey. The squid is explicitly identified as Architeuthis, but is inaccurately described as displaying prominent bioluminescence.
- H. P. Lovecraft frequently used tentacled, squid-like monsters in his Cthulhu Mythos, most notably the titular entity, Cthulhu.
- The giant squid specimen currently housed in the Darwin Centre at London's Natural History Museum forms a key role in the plot of fantasy author China Miéville's 2010 novel Kraken.
- Chapter 59 ("Squid") of Herman Melville's Moby-Dick details the Pequod's encounter with a giant squid.
- The creature used by Ozymandias in Alan Moore, Dave Gibbons, and Jim Higgins' comic book series Watchmen resembles the likeness of a squid.
- James Rollins' The Judas Strain (2007), the fourth book in his SIGMA Force series, provides detailed descriptions of sightings of schools of giant predatory attacks by Taningia danae squid in the waters off the island of Pusat and graphic descriptions of collaborative squid attacks on several characters.
- A giant squid dwells in the lake at Hogwarts in J.K. Rowling's Harry Potter series of books. It seems to be friendly towards the students, sometimes acting as a lifeguard when they swim or fall in the lake.
- A giant squid acts as a minor character in Charles Sheffield's novel The Web Between the Worlds.
- Various giant squids are mentioned in Tentacles, the sequel to Cryptid Hunters, by Roland Smith. The character E-Wolf is hired to capture a giant squid for the Northwest Zoo and Aquarium. Smith portrays the squids as pack hunters, when in real life they are solitary.
- In J.R.R. Tolkien's Lord of the Rings: The Fellowship of the Ring, the Fellowship battle the Watcher in the Water, a monster that lurks in the waters of the Sirannon, beneath the western walls of Moria. Although Tolkien's description is vague, the creature is frequently depicted as a giant squid or kraken with varying, often exaggerated, numbers of tentacles, such as in the 2001 film.
- The River Moth, which flows through author Jeff VanderMeer's fictional city of Ambergris, is inhabited by giant squid. The city is named after ambergris, a substance secreted by sperm whales.
- Captain Nemo's submarine, the Nautilus, fights a band of seven giant squid in Jules Verne's 1870 novel Twenty Thousand Leagues Under the Seas. In the 1954 film adaptation, there is only one giant squid, which was portrayed by a large prop and served as the film's antagonist.
- In H. G. Wells' "The Sea Raiders", a voracious swarm of giant squids, of the fictional species Haploteuthis ferox, slay a total of eleven people in boats and attack a man on shore.
- John Wyndham's book The Kraken Wakes depicts an invasion of squid-like aliens.

== Film and television ==
=== Film ===
(Chronological)

- John Wayne and Ray Milland battle a giant squid in the climax to Cecil B. DeMille's 1943 film Reap the Wild Wind.
- Walt Disney's 1954 adaptation, 20,000 Leagues Under the Sea, features a scene where Capt. Nemo's Nautilus is attacked by a giant squid.
- A giant squid appears in the film Voyage to the Bottom of the Sea (1961).
- In the film The Pagemaster (1994), Adventure, searching for a book to help Richard overcome his fear of heights, picks out Twenty Thousand Leagues Under the Seas and turns to a page with an illustration of a giant squid. Immediately, water gushes out of the book and the giant squid's tentacles emerge as Richard and Adventure ascend a ladder to escape.
- The Beast (1996), a film with William Petersen and Karen Sillas and based on Peter Benchley's novel, is about a giant squid terrorizing a Pacific Northwest island.
- At the end of the film Rugrats Go Wild (2003), Nigel Thornberry and the Rugrats see a live giant squid.
- The title of the film The Squid and the Whale (2005) refers to the popularly imagined combat between sperm whale and giant squid, specifically as depicted in the diorama at New York's American Museum of Natural History, which the main character visits in the final scene of the film.
- A blue, bioluminescent giant squid makes an appearance in the 2016 Disney/Pixar animated film, Finding Dory as an antagonist.
- A giant squid Titan, given the codename "MireSquid", appears in the 2017 science fiction kaiju film Kong: Skull Island, where the titular monster, Kong, subdues and eats one.

=== Television ===
(Alphabetical by series)

- The squid becomes a contender in the twelfth episode of Animal Face-Off (2004) against the sperm whale, in which it loses.
- The Doctor Who episode "The Power of Kroll" (1978) features a carnivorous monster resembling a giant squid which lives at the bottom of a swampy lake, and is worshipped by the natives despite the fact that it sometimes eats them.
- The giant squid, also known as Doctor Voltrang's Clone Monster, appears in the Godzilla episode "Calico Clones". After the Calico crew escape from evil clones of themselves, the scientist responsible for the clones' creation, Doctor Voltrang, sends his deadly giant squid to recapture them. Captain Majors summons Godzilla, who ties the squid's tentacles into knots, forcing it to retreat.
- In the Family Guy episode "Death Is a Bitch", a giant squid appears as an uninvited and threatening guest in the Griffin family's home that they choose to "just ignore and pretend it doesn't exist."
- In the Free Willy episode "Cephalopod", a giant squid named Goliath is genetically altered by The Machine and sent to catch and devour Willy the orca, his adopted little brother Einstein, the young orphaned dolphin, and their human friend Jesse. However, Willy defeats Goliath and foils The Machine's evil plan.
- In the Futurama episode "The Deep South" (2000), Fry and Umbriel cheer at a fight between a sperm whale and a giant squid.
- The Invader Zim episode "Zim Eats Waffles" features Dib watching Zim battling a "Giant Flesh-Eating Demon Squid", to the disbelief of his colleagues.
- In the Godzilla: The Series episode "New Family", mutant giant squids are causing trouble in Jamaica, and H.E.A.T. arrives to investigate. They are saved by Godzilla, who was presumed dead after being attacked by the military, and discover that the reported trouble must be coming from a more powerful, super predator, which turns out to be the Crustaceous Rex.
- The giant squid was #3 in the Most Extreme episode, "Body Parts", because it has the largest eyes of any living animal. It was #5 in another episode, "Monster Myths", because it is not a sea monster and cannot sink ships.
- The documentary series The Future Is Wild depicts certain species of squid evolving into land-based, air-breathing forms culminating in the 12-foot (3.7 m) tall, 8 ton "Megasquid" 200 million years in the future. Other squid species include an ocean-dwelling, 120-foot (37 m) long "Rainbow Squid" capable of highly sophisticated optical camouflage and color alterations, and the small, arboreal "Squibbon", highly agile terrestrial squid which spend their lives swinging through the branches of massive lichen trees of the future. It is implied that the Squibbon may someday evolve into Earth's next sapient life form.
- In "Pirates From Below", the eighteenth episode of Jonny Quest, the giant squid is a surprise visitor that gives Dr. Quest the opportunity to try out the underwater prober's arms.
- The British show Octonauts features both giant squid and colossal squid.
- A giant squid appears in the Rocko's Modern Life episode "Fish-N-Chumps". Unlike other depictions of a giant squid, the squid in this episode is friendly and saves Rocko, Heffer and Filburt in exchange for cheese.
- A giant squid attacks the ship Alton Brown is working on in the Good Eats episode "Squid Pro Quo 2".
- In The Replacements episode "The Means Justify the Trend" (2006), a giant squid attacks a submarine.
- In the Scooby-Doo! Mystery Incorporated episode "The Midnight Zone", a giant squid briefly appears when Mystery Incorporated investigate an undersea town in a submarine.
- In Super Friends, Superman and Aquaman rescue a cruise ship from a giant squid, which had been enlarged by the scientist Dr. Pisces. The giant squid's ink had the effect of instantly enlarging any marine creatures that came into contact with it.
- A giant squid and a colossal squid are featured in the Wild Kratts episode "Whale of a Squid".
- Below (miniseries), a 2026 Canadian mini series has a Giant Squid as the main creature terrorizing remote Newfoundland town of Snook's Arm.

== Music ==
(Alphabetical by artist)

=== Artists ===
- The post-metal band Giant Squid takes its name from the animal.
- Deathcore band "Here Comes the Kraken" refers to a giant squid.
- The Wizard Rock band "The Giant Squidstravaganza" takes its name from the animal, and its appearance in the Harry Potter series, and sings songs exclusively from the point of view of the giant squid, often expressing his love for toast.

=== Albums ===
- A giant squid fighting a sperm whale in space is shown on the album cover of They Might Be Giants' Apollo 18 (1992).

=== Songs ===
- Scottish pirate metal band Alestorm has a song on their album Back Through Time (2011) called "Death Throes of the Terrorsquid", about a band of pirates fighting a giant squid. The song is somewhat a continuation of a previous song called "Leviathan" from their Black Sails at Midnight (2008) album.
- Metal band "Engorged" have a song entitled "Architeuthis" from the album Where Monsters Dwell.
- Squid in general, particularly giant squid, are mentioned in several songs written by Robyn Hitchcock, notably the Soft Boys' song Underwater Moonlight
- "Mary The One-Eyed Prostitute Who Fought The Colossal Squid And Saved Us From Certain Death On The High Seas, God Rest Her One-Eyed Soul" is a song from The Dreadnoughts' debut album "Legends Never Die".

== Video games ==
(Alphabetical by game or franchise title)

- Giant squid appear in chapter 4 of Abzû.
- In Assassin's Creed II and Assassin's Creed IV: Black Flag, encounters with a giant squid appears as an Easter egg in both games. In Assassin's Creed II, Ezio can encounter a giant squid in the Assassin Tomb located under the Santa Maria Delle Visitazione. In Assassin's Creed IV: Black Flag, pirate Edward Kenway can watch a battle between white sperm whale and a giant squid while diving on the Antocha Wreck from the window of a wrecked ship.
- In BioShock, when entering the fictional city Rapture aboard an underwater elevator, a giant squid can be seen before it moves away, either fleeing from the elevator, or from the whale seen soon afterwards. Later in the game, a dead giant squid can be seen in a display case.
- In Command & Conquer: Red Alert 2, mind-controlled giant squids are one of the most powerful naval units in the Soviet arsenal.
- In Dragon Quest VIII: Journey of the Cursed King, one of the bosses is a giant squid called Khalamari, who uses two of its tentacles to act as hand puppets. He has attacked several ships, but after being defeated, reveals that he is friendly, but was brainwashed by Dhoulmagus. After being cured, Khalamari gives the party a Gold Bracer.
- In Endless Ocean for the Wii, a giant squid can be found in the Abyss, along with a sperm whale. Being a non-violent game, the giant squid will not hurt the player, and the sperm whale will not attack the giant squid. In the sequel Endless Ocean 2: Adventures of the Deep, however, the giant squid is too dangerous, and the only way to proceed is to lure a sperm whale to fight it, allowing the player to reach the mini-sub.
- In the game Jaws Unleashed, the shark encounters a colossal squid in the level "the Deep", and juvenile colossal squid can be encountered in free roam mode.
- In Kirby's Epic Yarn, the boss Capamari initially appears to be a giant squid wearing a knit cap, but is revealed to actually be an octopus.
- A giant squid is the boss of a level in Super Adventure Island II.
- In the Mario franchise, large squid-like monsters called Bloopers are common enemies of Mario; in some games, giant Bloopers serve as bosses.
  - In Super Mario RPG, the first boss of the sunken ship is a giant squid named King Calamari.
- In Poptropica, the discovery of the giant squid is the catalyst for the events of Cryptids Island, prompting the Mews Foundation to search for other cryptids.
- In the Dreamcast game Skies of Arcadia, the main character fights a giant squid named Obispo in a ship battle.
- In Sly 3: Honor Among Thieves, Sly and the gang attempt to subdue the legendary giant squid known as "Crusher" to defeat Blood Bath Bay's main antagonist, Captain Lefwee. After an battle between Crusher and Sly's crew aboard a pirate ship, they are able to subdue the giant creature and, with the help of The Guru, possess its mind for use in their operation.
- In the game Soulcalibur III, the character Nightmare gains a "giant" squid as his joke weapon.
- In Stranded Deep, the most powerful boss in the game, Lusca The Great, is a giant squid.
- In Super Metroid, the boss character Phantoon resembles a giant squid, as well as the Ozymandias squid creature from the comic series Watchmen.
- In Void Bastards, "junk squids" are a species of omnivorous giant squids capable of surviving in hard vacuum and large enough to devour even sizeable spacecraft.
- In World of Warcraft, the final boss in the Throne of the Tides dungeon is a giant squid called Ozumat. Its model has since been used in Mists of Pandaria as a quest enemy, and a dying one can be seen in the Isle of Thunder.
- In the fighting game X-Men: Children of the Atom, a giant squid is visible in the background in Omega Red's stage.

== Statues and sculptures ==
- The House on the Rock in Spring Green, Wisconsin has an enormous sculpture of a giant squid and sperm whale battling.
- A thirteen meter giant statue was constructed in the Japanese fishing town of Noto in 2021. The purpose of the statue was to attract tourists to the town, although it was widely criticised for being funded with coronavirus relief money.

== Miscellany ==
- The Lego Aqua Raiders "Aquabase Invasion" set is centered on a giant squid.

== See also ==
- Cephalopods in popular culture
- Kraken
- Kraken in popular culture
- Sailors' superstitions
