= When the Sleeper Wakes =

1899 dystopian science fiction novel by H. G. Wells

- First US edition with Lanos illustration
- Author: H. G. Wells
- Illustrator: Henri Lanos (1859–1929)
- Language: English
- Genre: Science fiction
- Publisher: Harper & Brothers (UK, US)
- Publication date: 1899, 1910 (at Wikisource: with 1921 preface)
- Publication place: London, England (UK); New York City, New York (US)
- Media type: Print
- Pages: 329 (1899), 288 (1910)
- OCLC: 2338373
- LC Class: PR5774 .S57 1910
- Text: When the Sleeper Wakes at Wikisource

When the Sleeper Wakes is an 1899 dystopian science fiction novel by English writer H. G. Wells, about a man who sleeps for 203 years and wakes up in a completely transformed late-21st-to-early-22nd-century London in which he has become the richest man in the world. The main character awakens to see his dreams realised, and the future revealed to him in all its horrors and malformities.

It was published as a serial, then as a book, in 1899. It was republished in a revised form in 1910 as The Sleeper Awakes. The 2004 Project Gutenberg title page displays on four lines that suggest a subtitle: The Sleeper Awakes; A Revised Edition of "When the Sleeper Wakes"; By H. G. Wells; 1899. The Library of Congress Catalog uses the subtitle.

== Publication history ==
When the Sleeper Wakes was originally published as a serial in The Graphic (London) and Harper's Weekly (New York), with illustrations by Henri Lanos. Both editions appeared in the first 18 issues of 1899, with Saturday dates 7 January to 5 May.

When the book was about to be reprinted again, Wells used this opportunity "to make a number of excisions and alterations", and changed its title to The Sleeper Awakes. As he explains in the preface of the 1910 edition, he was overworked and wrote under considerable pressure when he authored the original version simultaneously with another novel called Love and Mr. Lewisham, in addition to his journalistic obligations. Before going on a "badly needed holiday" to Italy, he felt he had to complete one of the two novels, and so rushed the ending on When the Sleeper Wakes just to finish it, hoping to return to it when he came back to England and before it went into print. But when he got home he fell seriously ill, and after forcing himself to complete Love and Mr. Lewisham, he never got the chance to do any rewriting of When the Sleeper Wakes before it was published.

What Wells disliked about it was the construction of the story and the rushed latter part. However, as so many years had passed, Wells claimed he could no longer identify with his younger self. As such, the work felt too remote for him to do any significant reconstruction. Instead he played the role of the "editorial elder brother" and cut some passages that felt redundant, improved certain "clumsy phrases and repetitions", straightened out some ambivalences at the end, and removed all signs of any love interest between characters. In the 1910 edition Wells also brought the 'flying machines' up to date.

The short story "A Story of the Days To Come" (1897) is a forerunner of the novel, being a tale set within the same future society.

== Plot ==
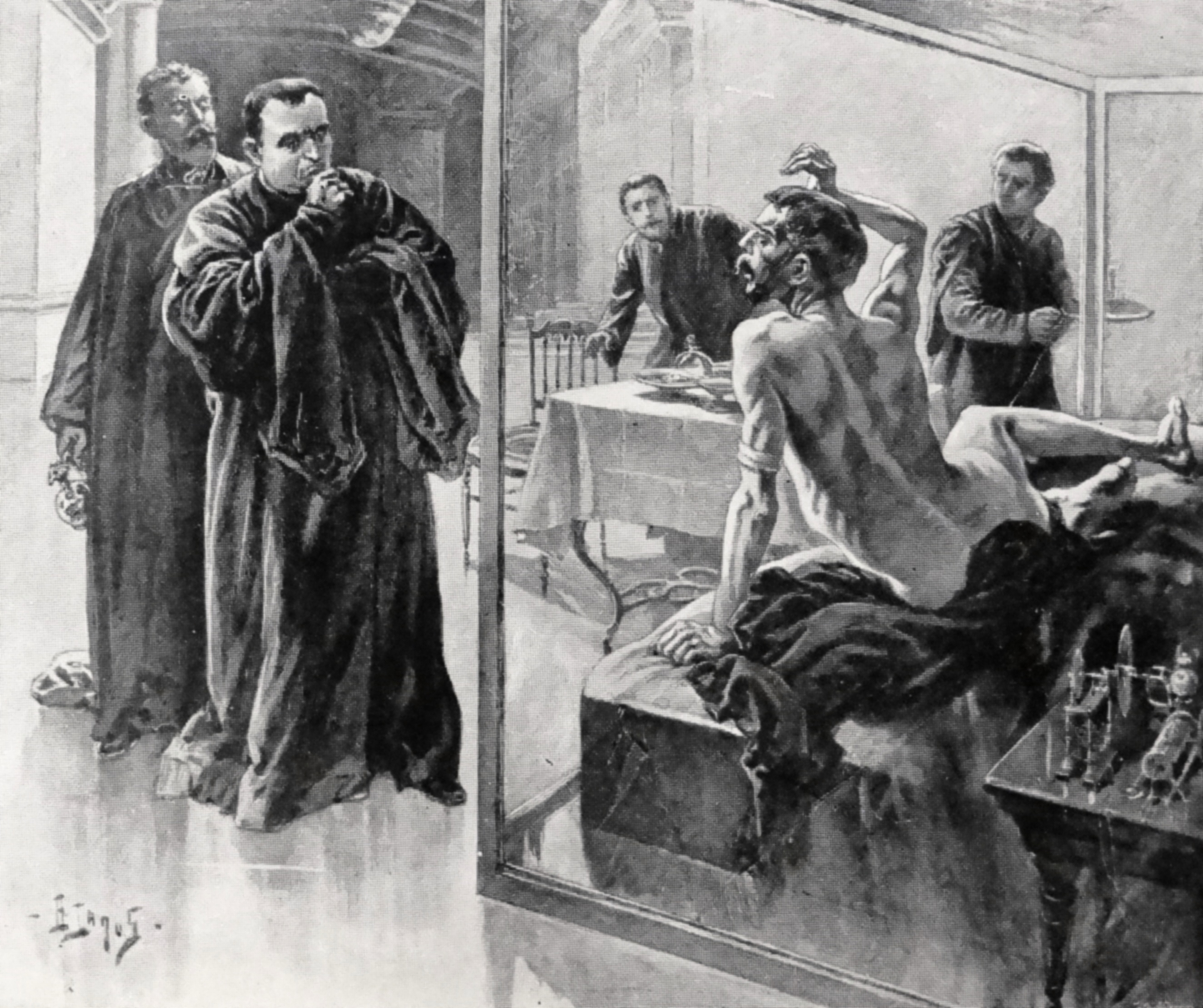
Graham awakens unexpectedly.

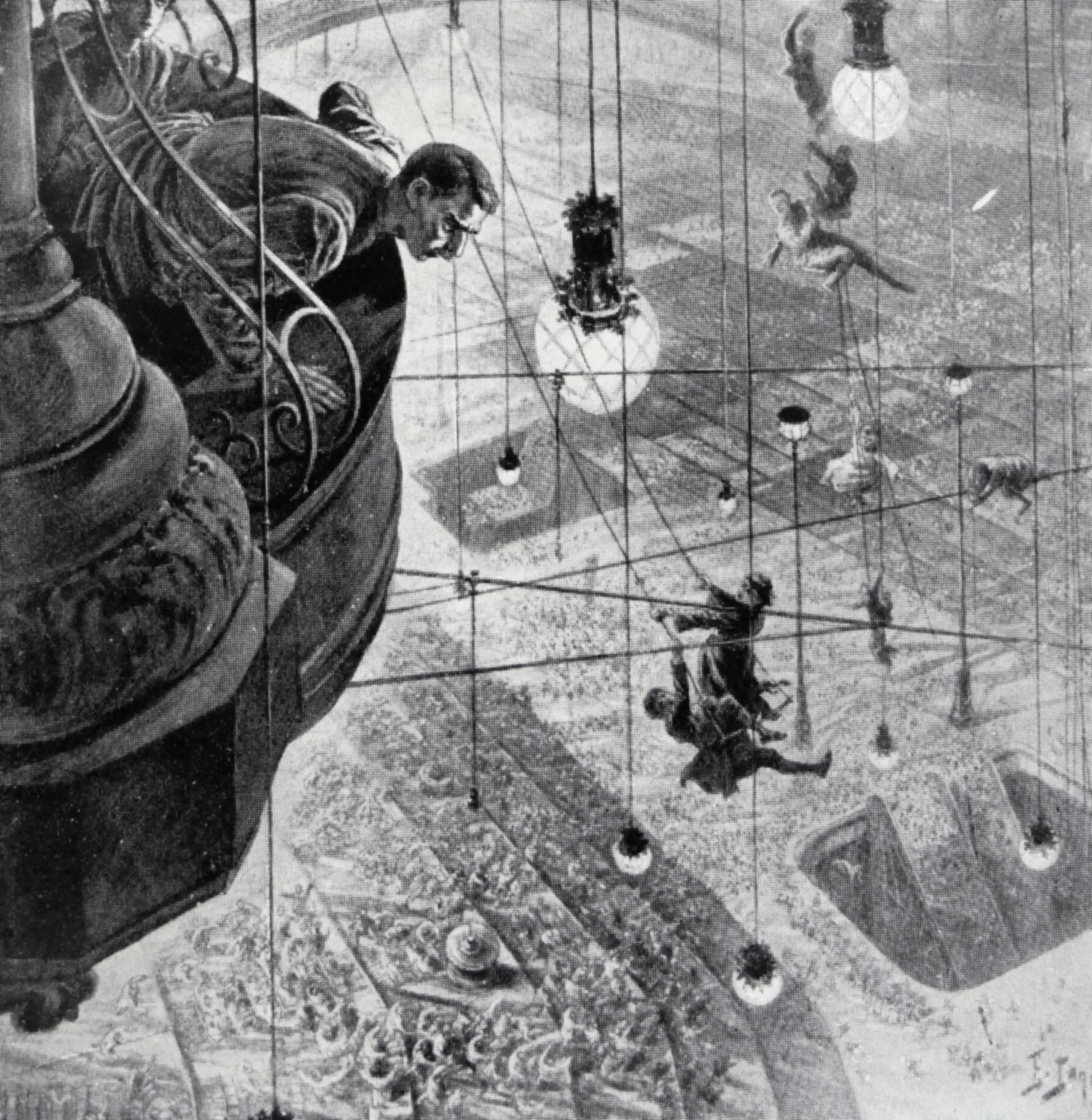
Graham, you must come away!

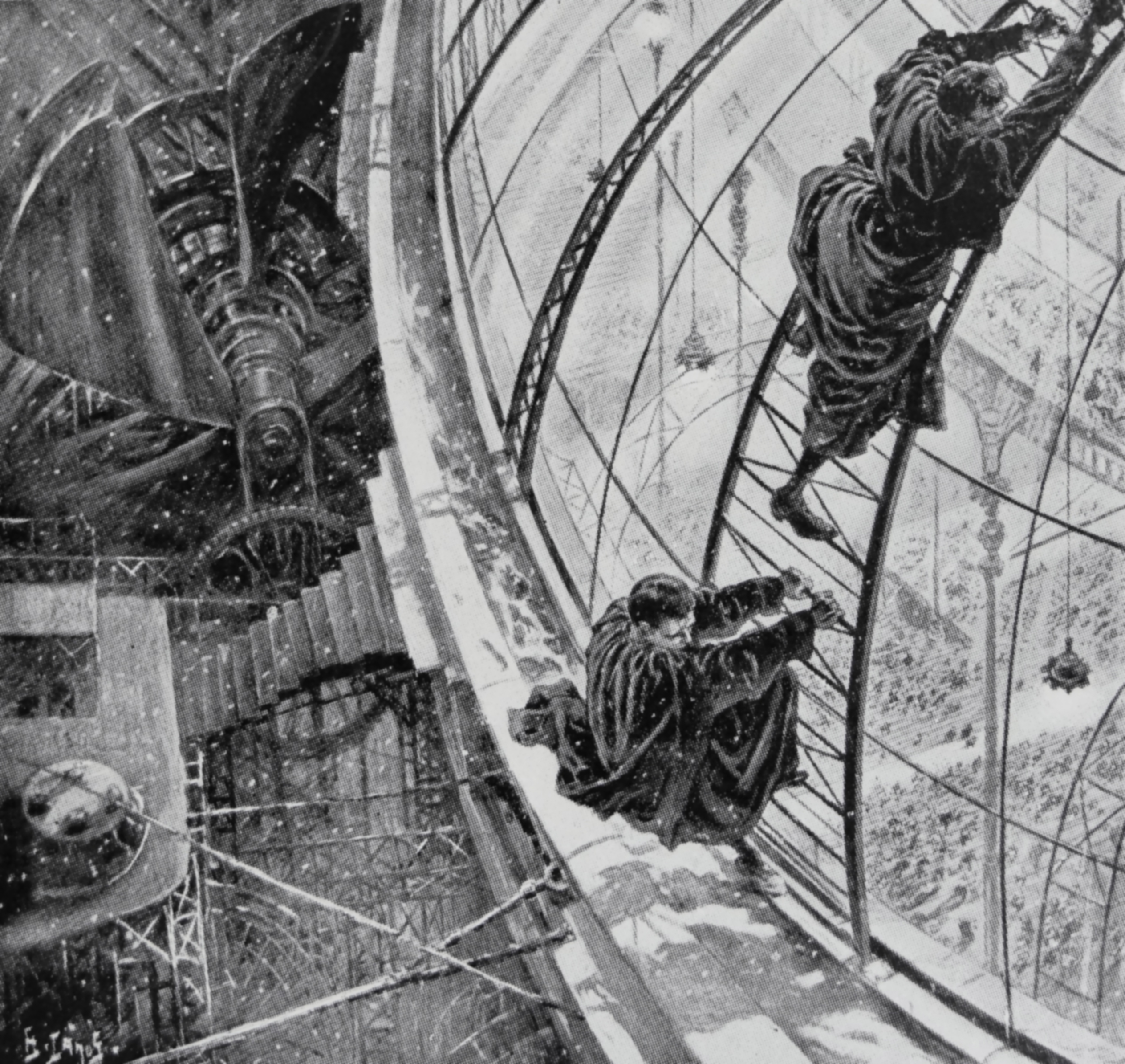
Graham's Escape.

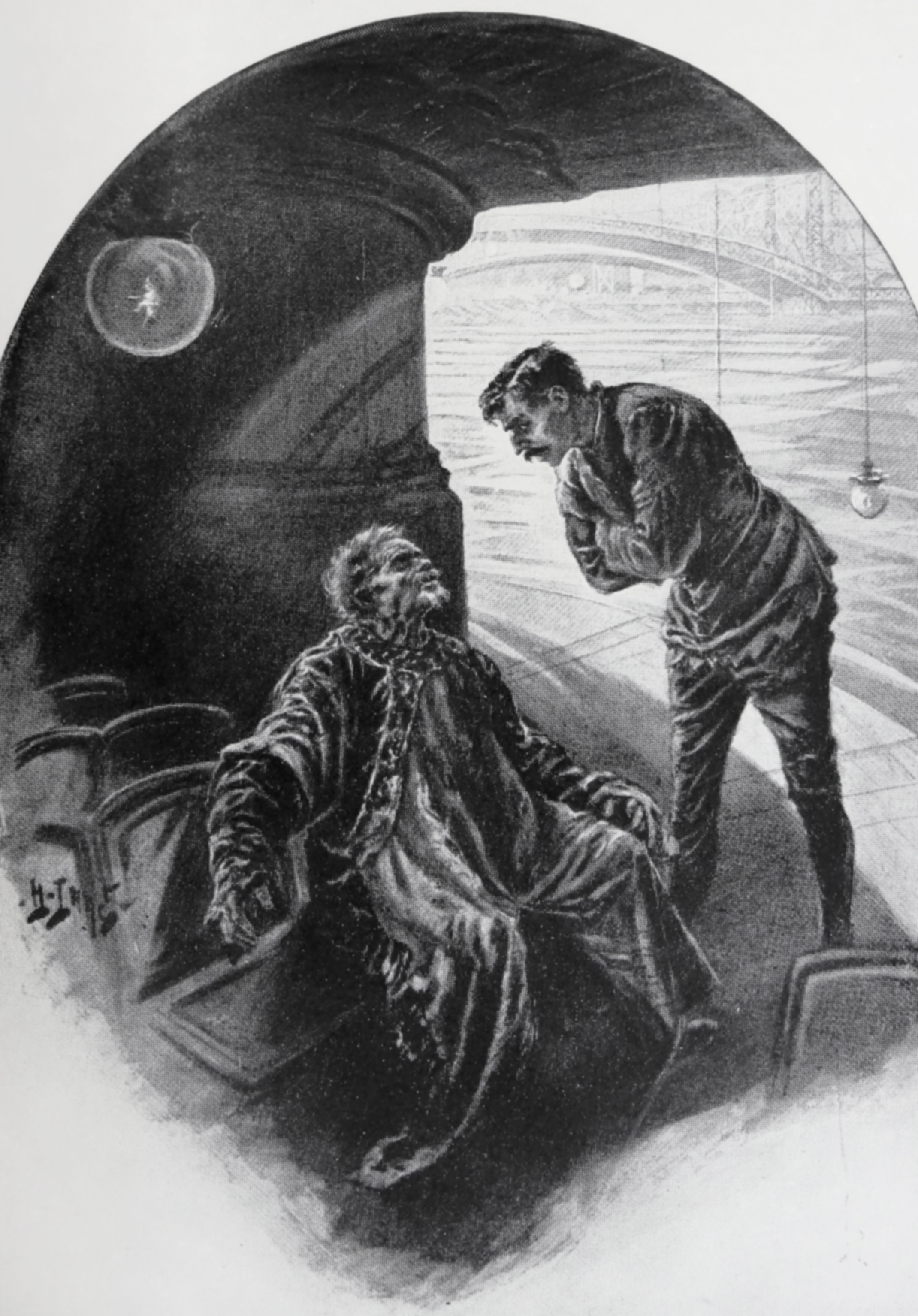
Graham gets a history lesson from the old man.

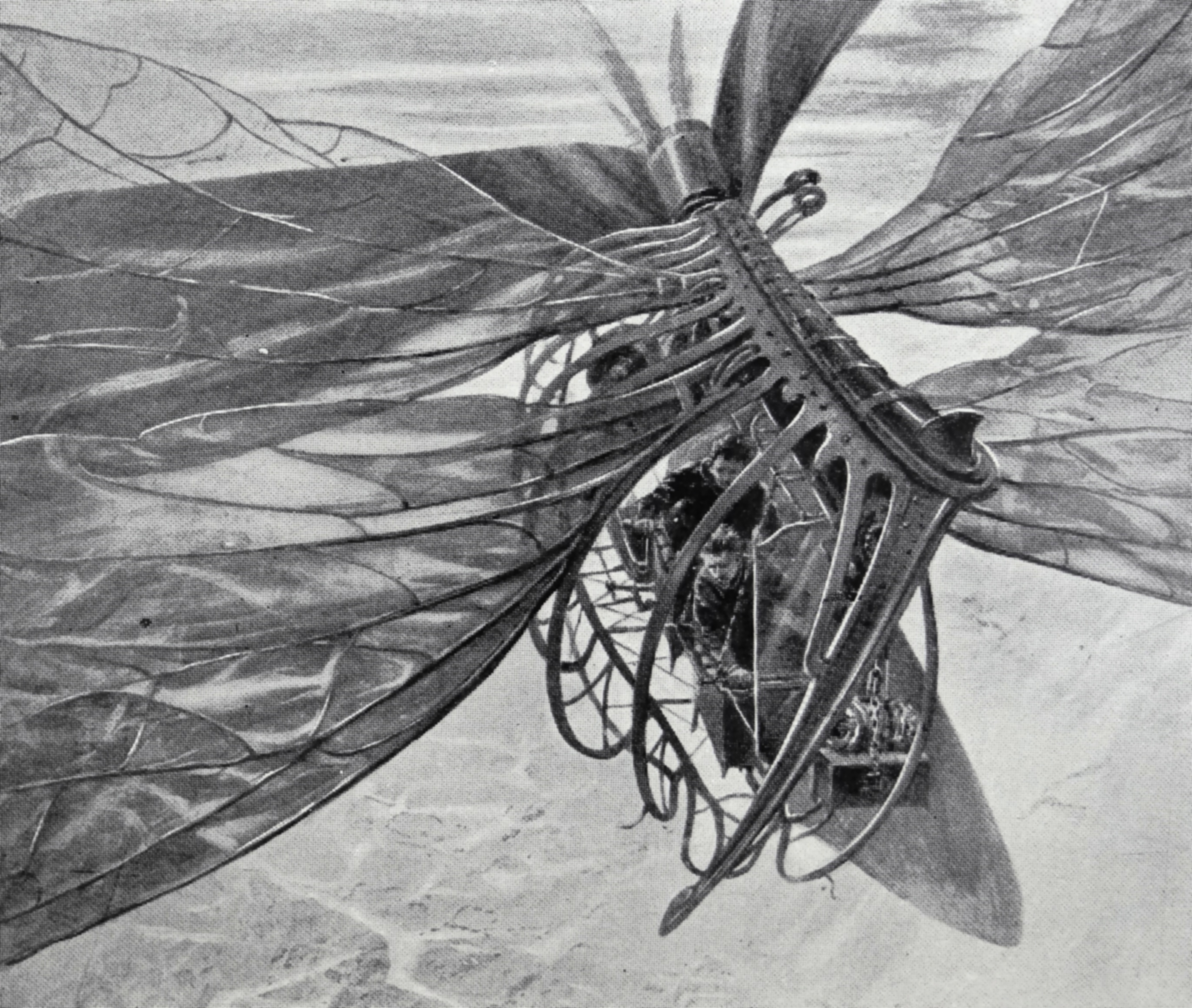
The Aeropile.

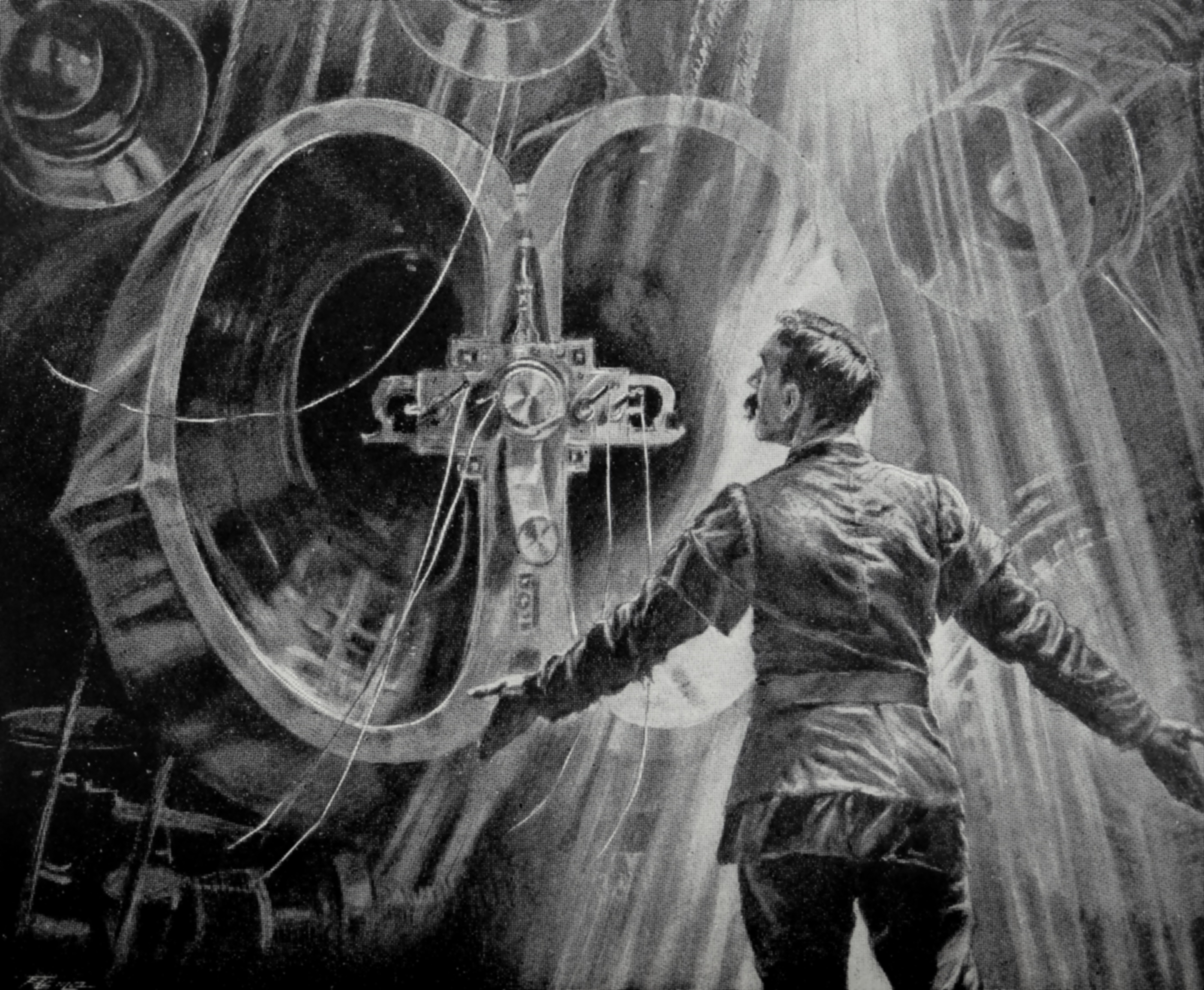
Graham addresses himself to the unseen multitudes.

(as revised, 1910)

Graham, an Englishman living in London in 1897, takes drugs which cause insomnia and falls into a coma. He wakes up in 2100. He later learns that he has inherited huge wealth and that his money has been put into a trust. Over the years, the trustees, the "White Council", have used his wealth to establish a vast political and economic world order.

When Graham wakes, he is disoriented. The people around him had not expected him to wake up, and are alarmed. Word spreads that the "Sleeper" has awakened. A mob gathers around the building and demands to see the fabled Sleeper. The people around Graham will not answer his questions. They place Graham under house arrest. Graham learns that he is the legal owner and master of most of the world.

Rebels led by Ostrog help Graham to escape. They say that the people need Graham's leadership to rise against the White Council. Unconvinced, but unwilling to remain a prisoner, Graham goes with them. Graham arrives at a massive hall where the workers have gathered to prepare for the revolution. They march against the White Council but are soon attacked by the state police. In the confusion, Graham is separated from the revolutionaries. He meets an old man who tells him the story of the Sleeper – the White Council invested his wealth to buy the industries and political entities of half the world, establishing a plutocracy and sweeping away parliament and the monarchy. The Sleeper is just a figurehead. The old man thinks that the Sleeper is a made-up figure used to brainwash the population.

Graham meets Ostrog, who says that the rebels have won and that the people are demanding that the Sleeper should rule. Ostrog retains power while Graham becomes his puppet ruler. Graham gets interested in aeroplanes and learns how to fly. He sees from the air that no-one lives in the country or small towns any more, all agriculture being run like industry; and that there are now only four huge cities in Britain, all powered by huge wind-mills. His carefree life ends when Helen Wotton tells him that, for the lower class, the revolution has changed nothing. Graham questions Ostrog who admits that the lower classes are still dominated and exploited, but he defends the system. It emerges that Ostrog only wanted to take power for himself and has used the revolution and Graham to do so.

Ostrog admits that in other cities the workers have continued to rebel even after the fall of the White Council. Ostrog has used a black African police force to get the workers back in line. Graham is furious and demands that Ostrog keep his police out of London. Ostrog agrees. Graham decides to examine this new society for himself.

Graham visits London in disguise to see how the workers live. Their lives are ghastly. Unskilled workers toil in factories, paid in food for each day's work, with no job security. They speak a dialect so strong that Graham cannot understand them. Industrial diseases are rife. Workers wear uniforms of different colour according to their trade. The family unit no longer exists and children are cared for in huge institutions. Lives are dominated by "babble machines" which spread news and "pleasure cities" where unspecified joys are available. "Euthanasy" is considered normal.

Graham learns that Ostrog has ordered his troops to London. Graham confronts Ostrog, who tries to arrest Graham. The workers rise up again and help Graham to escape. He meets Helen and learns that it was she who told the public about Ostrog's treachery. Graham leads the liberation of London.

Ostrog escapes and joins his troops who are flying to London. His men still hold a few airports. The workers find anti-aircraft guns, but they need time to set them up. The revolutionaries have only one aircraft; Graham gives away all of his wealth to the rebels and proceeds to fly the one aircraft against the invaders, bringing some of them down. The revolutionaries get the anti-aircraft guns working and start to shoot down the invaders. Graham finally attacks Ostrog's aeroplane but fails, and his aeroplane crashes into the ground.

== Themes ==
Themes include socialism; the betrayal of revolution; and how an elite can manipulate a population both by oppression and impoverishment on the one hand, and by the use of technology and provision of pleasure on the other. In this respect, the book has elements explored later both in Brave New World by Aldous Huxley and Nineteen Eighty-Four by George Orwell. The book itself sometimes references prior utopian novels of the time, including Looking Backward, News from Nowhere, and Crystal Age, although the latter two are not mentioned in the revised edition.

== Reception ==
Floyd C. Gale of Galaxy Science Fiction said of The Sleeper Awakes despite the "impossibly timid" and outdated science, "The worth of the story lies in its human values… This is 'Young Wells' at his non-Utopian best".

== Proposed film ==
In the late 1960s, George Pal wanted to make a film of the novel. He heard American International Pictures had the rights and offered to buy it from them. They invited him to make the film for them. However, no film resulted.

== Influence ==
Aspects of the novel's storyline are similar to the plot of the Woody Allen 1973 film Sleeper.

Terry Nation drew inspiration from The Sleeper Awakes for the British dystopian science fiction television series, Blake's 7.

The 1993 American science fiction action film Demolition Man contains allusions to The Sleeper Awakes, borrowing the concept of the "sleeper" as well.
