= The Plattner Story =

- Short story by H. G. Wells
- Country: United Kingdom
- Genre: Science fiction

Publication
- Published in: The New Review
- Publication type: Periodical
- Media type: Print
- Publication date: April 1896

"The Plattner Story" is a short story by English writer H. G. Wells, first published in 1896 in The New Review. It was included in The Plattner Story and Others, a collection of short stories by Wells first published in 1897, and in The Country of the Blind and Other Stories, a collection of his short stories first published in 1911. In the story, a man recounts his experiences in a parallel world, which he speculates is some form of Afterlife.

== Background ==
The story is an early example of science fiction in which a parallel world is described. The protagonist reaches this world by moving through the fourth dimension, a concept described in 1880 by Charles Howard Hinton, a mathematician and writer of science fiction, in his essay "What is the Fourth Dimension?".

== Plot summary ==
The narrator discusses the case of Gottfried Plattner, a schoolteacher in the south of England. He establishes the known facts: the unsymmetrical parts of his body are opposite from the usual way round, and his unsymmetrical facial features are the reverse of what are seen on his portrayal in an old photograph. "The curious inversion of Plattner's right and left sides is proof that he has moved out of our space into what is called the Fourth Dimension, and that he has returned again to our world." Plattner disappeared when he experimented in a chemistry class with green powder found by a boy, which caused an explosion; he re-appeared nine days later. He has related his account of that period to the narrator, who sets it down so that the reader can decide whether it is plausible.

After the explosion, Plattner, still with the bottle containing the rest of the green powder, tries to make sense of his new environment. The schoolroom and people there are seen faintly; they do not see or hear him, and they can walk through him. The solid environment around him, which he explores, is a rocky hillside, and the sky has a green glow. People, dispersing from a mausoleum-like building in a gorge, have heads showing distress and anguish, above tadpole-like bodies. They seem to be unaware of him. Still faintly seeing our world which is superimposed on this "Other-World", he notices that "to almost every human being in our world there pertained some of these drifting heads; that everyone in the world is watched intermittently by these helpless disembodiments". The narrator calls them "Watchers of the Living". "It may be... that, when our life has closed, when evil or good is no longer a choice for us, we may still have to witness the working out of the train of consequences we have laid."

Plattner notices a room in a street near the school, where a dying man lies in bed; a woman in the room is looking for a document. Many "Watchers of the Living", who seem to know the woman, are there, contemplating the event: "Faces that might once have been coarse, now purged to strength by sorrow." When the woman finds what she seeks, perhaps a will, she burns it in the flame of a candle. A shadowy arm stretches across to the man in the bed. Not daring to see the shadow behind the arm, Plattner runs and falls, smashing the bottle of green powder, which explodes; and so he returns to his former world.

The narrator later finds that there was a death in a street near the school at the time of Plattner's return. The widow, much younger than the deceased, soon married again. The narrator interviews her: although she contradicts Plattner's account of events during her husband's last moments, Plattner's description of the room is curiously accurate.

== See also ==
- Fourth dimension in literature
- The Time Ships, which connects "The Plattner Story" to The Time Machine
