= The Cone =

- Short story by H. G. Wells
- Country: United Kingdom
- Genres: Science fiction, horror fiction

Publication
- Published in: Unicorn
- Media type: Print
- Publication date: 18 September 1895

"The Cone" is a short story by H. G. Wells, first published in 1895 in Unicorn. It was intended to be "the opening chapter of a sensational novel set in the Five Towns", later abandoned.

The story is set at an ironworks in Stoke-on-Trent, in Staffordshire. An artist is there to depict the industrial landscape; the manager of the ironworks discovers his affair with his wife, and takes him on a tour of the factory, where there are dangerous features.

== Summary ==
Raut, an artist, is visiting Horrocks, manager of the Jeddah Company Blast Furnaces, in order to study the industrial sights. An affair has developed between Raut and Horrocks's wife; Horrocks, unexpectedly entering the room where they are talking on a midsummer evening, seems to suspect it.

Horrocks takes Raut to show him around.

A blue haze, half dust, half mist, touched the long valley with mystery. Beyond were Hanley and Etruria, grey and dark masses, outlined thinly by the rare golden dots of the street lamps.... Here and there a pallid patch and ghostly stunted beehive shapes showed the position of a pot-bank, or a wheel, black and sharp against the hot lower sky, marked some colliery where they raise the iridescent coal of the place. Nearer at hand was the broad stretch of railway, and half invisible trains shunted... And to the left, between the railway and the dark mass of the low hill beyond, dominating the whole view, colossal, inky-black, and crowned with smoke and fitful flames, stood the great cylinders of the Jeddah Company Blast Furnaces... They stood heavy and threatening, full of an incessant turmoil of flames and seething molten iron, and about the feet of them rattled the rolling-mills, and the steam hammer beat heavily and splashed the white iron sparks hither and thither.

They walk towards Horrocks's ironworks.

'You see the fine effect of the railway signals towards Burslem,' said Horrocks, suddenly breaking into loquacity, striding fast, and tightening the grip of his elbow the while. 'Little green lights and red and white lights, all against the haze. You have an eye for effect, Raut. It's a fine effect.'

The route takes them near the railway line, and Raut wonders if Horrocks, guiding him roughly by the arm, is trying to push him into danger.

In the factory, Horrocks shows him the cone over the "throat" of a furnace, which is held from above by a chain; the cone shuts off the heat from the furnace to save energy, and is regularly lowered by the chain so that more fuel can be added.

Finally Horrocks seizes Raut by the arm; Raut loses his balance and he falls, saving himself by clutching the chain of the cone.

Horrocks, he saw, stood above him by one of the trucks of fuel on the rail. The gesticulating figure was bright and white in the moonlight, and shouting, 'Fizzle, you fool! Fizzle, you hunter of women!...' Suddenly he caught up a handful of coal out of the truck, and flung it deliberately, lump after lump, at Raut.

The cone drops and Raut, enveloped by hot gas escaping from the furnace, begins a slow and agonising death. Horrocks' anger gives way to remorse. He pours a load of coal onto Raut, which knocks him into the flames and ends his suffering.

== Writing and publication ==
Wells lived in Staffordshire for a few months in 1888, in Basford, near to Etruria where there were ironworks. This period saw his first contact with industrial England. Wells found "the strange landscape of the Five Towns with its blazing iron foundries, its steaming canals, its clay whitened pot-banks and the marvellous effects of dust and smoke-laden atmosphere, very stimulating". "The Cone" includes evocative descriptions of the sights and sounds of the industrial landscape.

"The Cone" was included in the collection of Wells short stories The Plattner Story and Others, published by Methuen & Co. in 1897. It was reprinted in The Country of the Blind and Other Stories, a collection of short stories by Wells published by Thomas Nelson & Sons in 1911.
