= In the Abyss =

1896 short story by H. G. Wells

- Short story by H. G. Wells
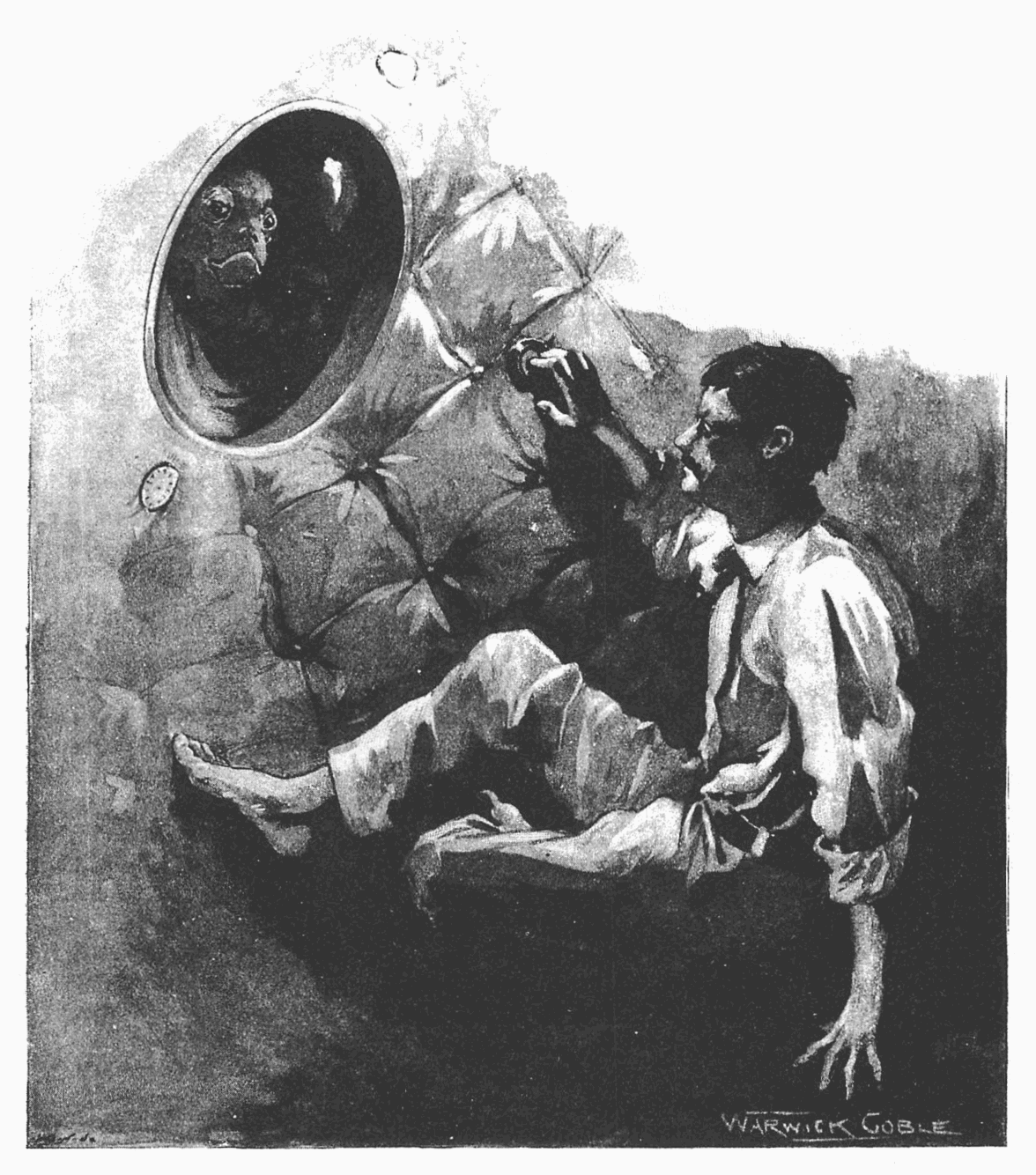
- Country: United Kingdom
- Genre: Science fiction

Publication
- Published in: Pearson's Magazine
- Publication type: Periodical
- Publisher: C. Arthur Pearson
- Media type: Print
- Publication date: August 1896

"In the Abyss" is a short story by English writer H. G. Wells, first published in 1896 in Pearson's Magazine. It was included in The Plattner Story and Others, a collection of short stories by Wells first published in 1897. The story describes a journey to the ocean bed in a specially designed metal sphere; the explorer within discovers a civilization of human-like creatures.

== Historical background ==
The Challenger expedition, arranged by the Royal Society, was the first systematic deep-sea exploration. From 1872 to 1876, HMS Challenger surveyed and explored around the world; the physical and chemical qualities of the deep sea were investigated, and biological samples were collected by dredges.

The bathysphere, a spherical deep-sea submersible which Elstead's apparatus seems to resemble, first appeared in the 1930s.

== Story summary ==
Elstead has invented an apparatus by which a person can travel to great depths and observe the life on the sea bed. It is a steel sphere, about nine feet in diameter, intended to withstand immense pressure. Weights attached to the sphere by a cord take it to the sea bed. The explorer makes observations through the window in the sphere, oxygen inside being replaced by a fictitious "Myers apparatus". A clockwork mechanism cuts the cable after a certain time, and the buoyancy of the sphere takes it back to the surface.

The sphere is to be lowered into the water from the Ptarmigan, which has sailed to a region where the water is five miles deep. The organization behind the project (perhaps funded by a scientific body, or by Elstead) is not specified.

The details of the sphere, and of Elstead's plan to use it to view the ocean floor, are made clear in the conversations of Elstead and the officers of the Ptarmigan; because of the immense pressure at the depth to be explored, the officers have their doubts about the apparatus working to plan, and about Elstead's likelihood of survival.

The sphere does not return on schedule. While the ship's officers wait, "the December sun was now high in the sky, and the heat very considerable." By midnight, they are fearing the worst; then they spot the re-emergence of the sphere. It is eventually retrieved at dawn.

After a week, Elstead has recovered enough to tell his experiences. He relates the eventful descent, lasting several minutes, during which the sphere became unexpectedly hot. On the sea bed, after observing the unusual species of fish and invertebrates, he sees "a strange vertebrated animal.... The vertical pitch of its face gave it a most extraordinary resemblance to a human being.... It was a biped; its almost globular body was poised on a tripod of two frog-like legs and a long thick tail." This creature, together with others, tow the sphere to a kind of altar in their city; the inhabitants prostrate themselves before Elstead, and chant. He observes this for several hours: eventually the cable breaks and the sphere returns to the surface.

The narrator has talked to eminent scientists, who think such a civilization is quite possible; he further speculates: "We should be known to them, however, as strange, meteoric creatures, wont to fall catastrophically dead out of the mysterious blackness of their watery sky. And not only we ourselves, but our ships, our metals, our appliances, would come raining down out of the night.... One can understand, perhaps, something of their behaviour at the descent of a living man...."

Elstead never writes an account of his experience; after making improvements to the sphere, he makes another descent, but (like The Time Traveller in Wells's The Time Machine) he does not return from his second adventure.

== Reception ==
The story was translated to Polish and included in the 1985 two-story collection Atak z głębiny (together with The Sea Riders) that was reviewed by Leszek Bugajski for Fantastyka (5/87, p. 57). The collection also includes an introduction by Polish scholar Andrzej Zgorzelski, analyzing both texts.

== Multilingual editions ==
- In the Abyss / In den Abgrund / Dans l´abîme. Calambac Publishing House, Germany 2023, trilingual edition: English/German/French, ISBN 978-3-943117-25-7.

== See also ==
- Deep-sea exploration
- List of underwater science fiction works
