= The Sea Raiders =

- Short story by H. G. Wells

Text available at Wikisource
- Country: United Kingdom
- Genre: Science fiction

Publication
- Published in: The Weekly Sun Literary Supplement
- Publication type: Periodical
- Media type: Print
- Publication date: 6 December 1896

"The Sea Raiders" is a short story by H. G. Wells, first published in 1896 in The Weekly Sun Literary Supplement. It was included in The Plattner Story and Others, a collection of short stories by Wells published by Methuen & Co. in 1897. It was included in The Country of the Blind and Other Stories, a collection of short stories by Wells published by Thomas Nelson & Sons in 1911.

The story describes a brief period when a previously unknown sort of giant squid, which attacks humans, is encountered on the coast of Devon, England.

== Background ==
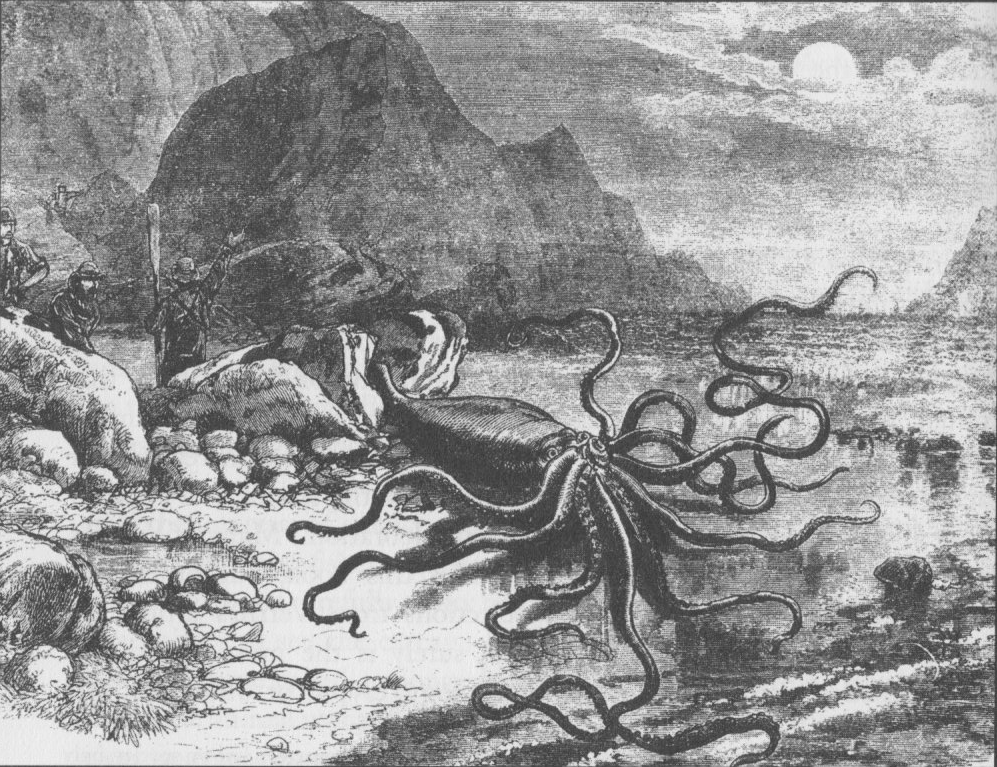
A giant squid that washed ashore in Newfoundland in 1877.

Legendary sea monsters include Scylla and Charybdis of Greek mythology, and the kraken of medieval times which is thought to have been a giant squid.

Previous fictional encounters with giant squids are described in chapter 59 of Herman Melville's Moby-Dick of 1851, and in Jules Verne's Twenty Thousand Leagues Under the Seas of 1870.

== Story summary ==
The narrator describes a recent period when a new sort of giant squid, a species named Haploteuthis ferox, became known. (This fictitious name can be compared with the genus name Architeuthis of the giant squid.) As a part of the survey of the period, including early encounters near Land's End and Terceira Island, he describes the adventure of Fison (whom he has met), the first person to see one and survive:

While walking along the a cliff path, Fison, a retired tea-dealer on holiday in Sidmouth (Devon, England), sees some birds interested in something on the rocky shoreline near Jacob's Ladder. He goes to investigate, and finds octopus-like sea creatures, along with a partially eaten human body. At first he thinks the sea creatures are harmless, but when they notice his presence they chase him to the foot of the cliffs; he barely manages to escape their grasp.

He returns in a boat, with the boatman and two local workmen, to the same area, where the tide is now coming in, and he shows them where he encountered the creatures. They see them below in the shallow water. Their tentacles start to reach for the occupants of the boat, and there is a prolonged struggle, the oars and a boat hook are used as weapons, which are gripped by the creatures. During all this, a larger boat is seen: the occupants, which include three women and a child, seem unaware of the danger. Fison tries to warn them.

The arm of the boatman in Fison's boat becomes covered with tentacles: "the eyes of one of the brutes that had hold of him, glaring straight and resolute, showed momentarily above the surface." He is pulled underwater.

The incoming tide carries the boat onto the rocky shore; Fison and the two workmen, in terror, leave the boat and run from the sea. Fison realizes he is no longer being pursued, and then remembers that there was another boat. "He looked back again, and there were now two boats floating, and the one farthest out at sea pitched clumsily, bottom upward."

After describing a few later incidents, the narrator suggests theories for the presence of the creatures: that hunger forced them to move away from their usual habitat in the deep sea; or that a shoal of them, after a foundering ship happened to sink amongst them, took a liking to human flesh and followed Atlantic traffic to the coast. It seems the incidents have ceased and that the squids have returned to deeper waters for good, but this is not certain.

== Reception ==
The story was translated to Polish and included in the 1985 two-story collection Atak z głębiny (together with In the Abyss) that was reviewed by Leszek Bugajski for Fantastyka (5/87, p. 57). The collection also includes an introduction by Polish scholar Andrzej Zgorzelski, analyzing both texts.

== See also ==
- Giant squid in popular culture
- Kraken in popular culture
- Cephalopods in popular culture
- Cephalopod size
- Beast (Benchley novel)
- Toilers of the Sea by Victor Hugo
