= The Measure of the Rule =

Novel by Robert Barr

The Measure of the Rule is a 1907 coming-of-age novel about a country teacher who migrates to the city to study engineering, but is forced by dint of circumstance to go to a teachers' training college, where he meets his wife-to-be. Written by the one-time Detroit Free Press journalist Robert Barr (known in the Press as 'Luke Sharp') it is both an indictment of an age gone by in which discipline and religion slide towards perversion and voyeurism, and a reminiscence of an innocent time before the great conflicts of the twentieth century, a time in which respect, delicacy and modesty prevailed in the relationships between man and woman, student and teacher. A complex and forgotten masterpiece of observation, whimsy and melodrama, it is reminiscent both of Mark Twain and Booth Tarkington. The title comes from 2 Corinthians 10:13 "according to the measure of the rule which God hath distributed to us, a measure to reach even unto you" (King James Version)

== Reception ==
John Moss called the book second rate but is notable in its portrayal of the city of Toronto as a place of "colourful vigour" which was unmatched until Hugh Garner's Cabbagetown which was not published until 1950.
