= Robert Barr (writer, born 1849) =

Scottish-Canadian writer (1849–1912)

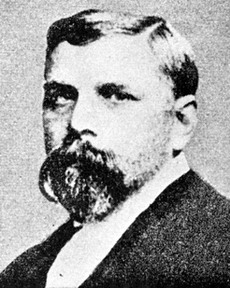
- Born: 16 September 1849; Glasgow, Scotland
- Died: 21 October 1912 (aged 63); Woldingham, Surrey, England
- Occupations: Educator, journalist, editor, publisher, novelist
- Writing career
- Pen name: Luke Sharp

Robert Barr (16 September 1849 – 21 October 1912) was a Scottish-Canadian short story writer and novelist who also worked as a newspaper and magazine editor.

== Early years in Canada ==
Barr was born in Glasgow, Scotland, to Robert Barr and Jane Watson. In 1854, he emigrated with his parents to Upper Canada. His family settled on a farm near the village of Muirkirk. Barr assisted his father with his work as a carpenter and builder and was a teacher in Kent County, then in 1873 entered the Toronto Normal School.

After graduating, he taught in Walkerville and in 1874 became headmaster of the Central School at Windsor in 1874. During the 1870s, he wrote humorous pieces for various publications, including the Toronto Grip, under the pseudonym "Luke Sharp", which he took from an undertaker's sign. After the Detroit Free Press serialized his account of a boating trip on Lake Erie, in 1876 he changed careers and became a reporter there, then a columnist. Two of his brothers followed him to the newspaper.

== London years ==
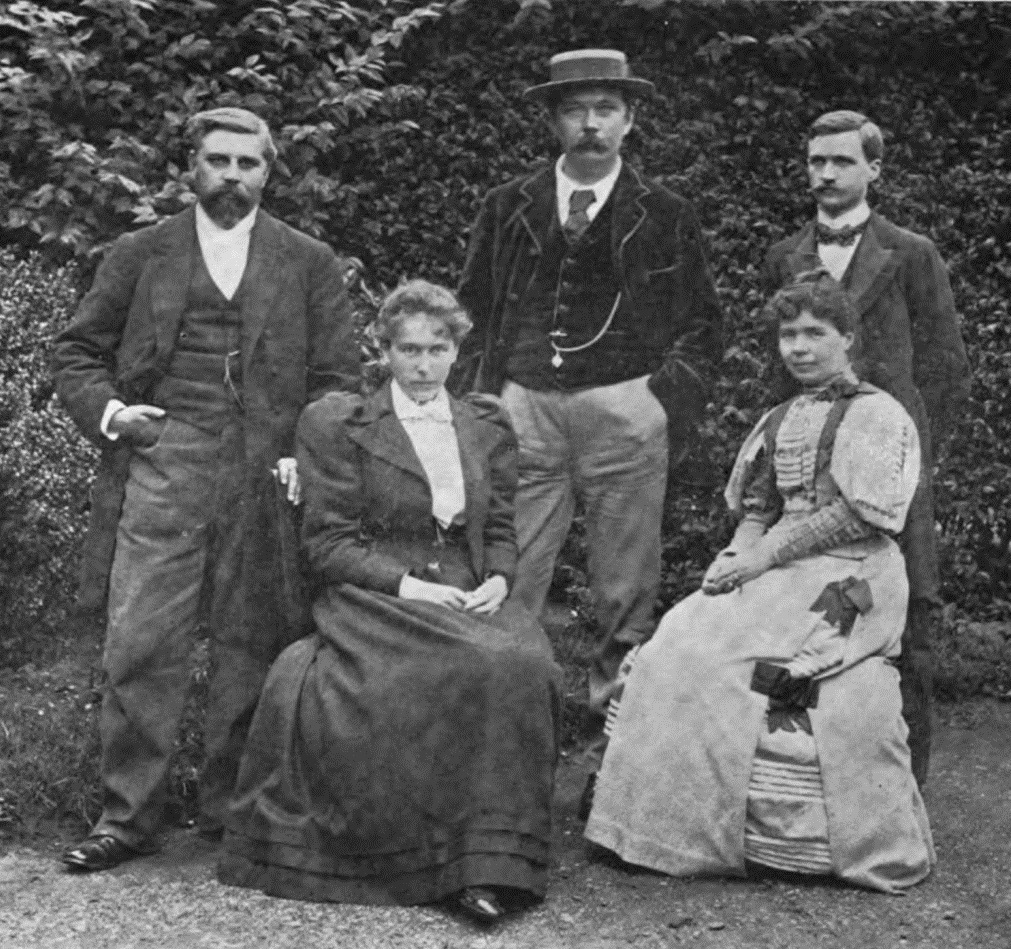
Barr (left) with Arthur Conan Doyle (centre) and Doyle's daughter and wife (front)

In 1881, by which time he was exchange editor of the Free Press, Barr decided to leave the ranch and relocated to London to continue his fiction writing career while establishing a weekly English edition of the newspaper. The magazine was very successful. In 1892, he founded the magazine The Idler, choosing Jerome K. Jerome as his collaborator (wanting, as Jerome said, "a popular name"). This was also very successful. Barr stepped down as co-editor in 1894, but in 1902 became the sole proprietor and returned as editor.

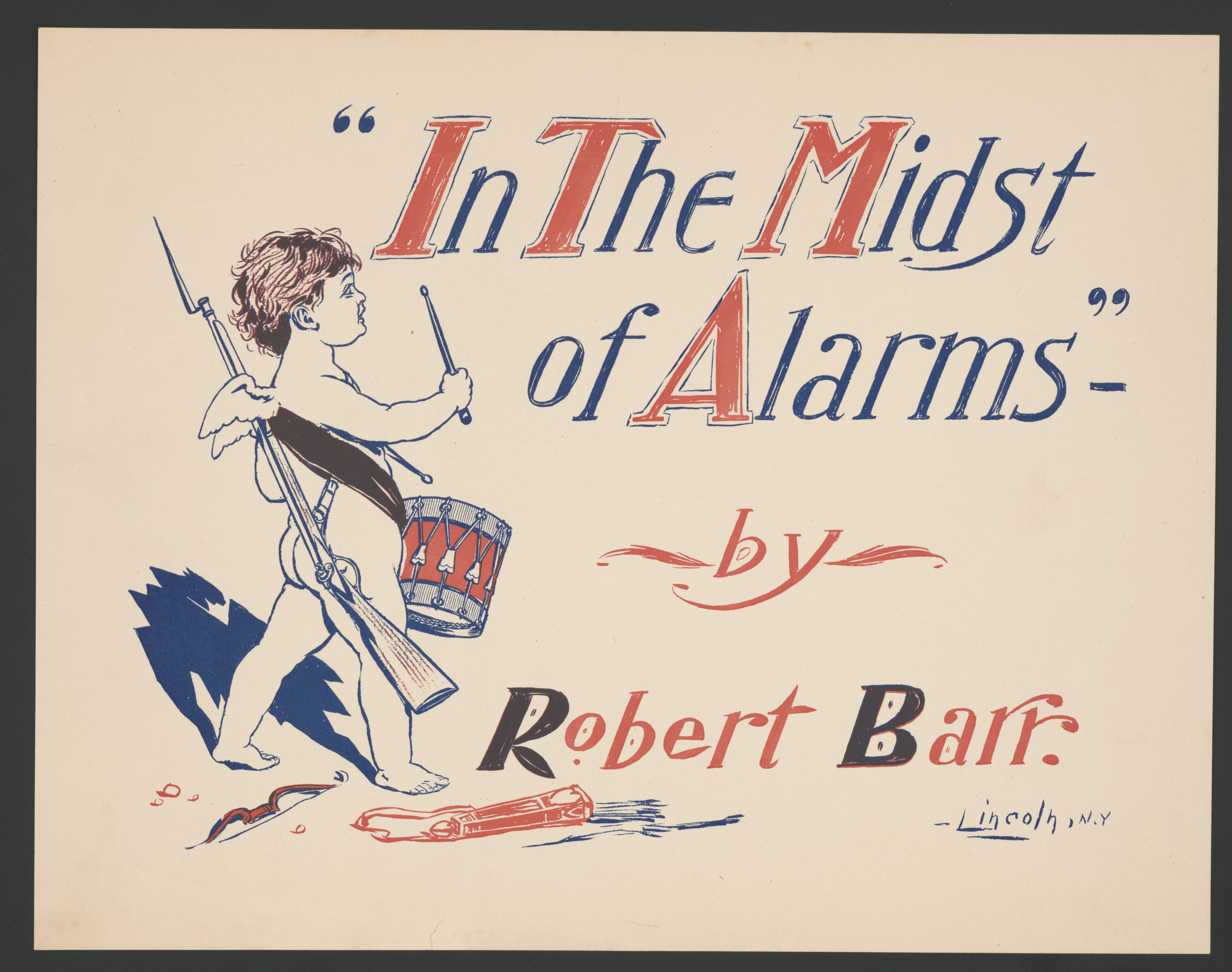

In London in the 1890s, Barr began writing crime novels and became more prolific, publishing a book a year. He also wrote stories of the supernatural. Detective stories were much in vogue because of the popularity of Conan Doyle's Sherlock Holmes stories; Barr published the first Sherlock Holmes parody, "Detective Stories Gone Wrong: The Adventures of Sherlaw Kombs" (also known as "The Great Pegram Mystery") in The Idler in 1892, and followed it in 1894 with "The Adventure of the Second Swag". His 1906 novel The triumphs of Eugène Valmont parodies Holmes and other "gentleman detectives" whose pompous sleuth is a possible antecedent of Agatha Christie's Hercule Poirot.

Barr socialized widely with other best-selling authors. In 1903, despite initial reservations about taking on the project, he completed The O'Ruddy, a novel left unfinished by his recently deceased friend Stephen Crane. Despite his Holmes satires, he remained on very good terms with Conan Doyle, who described him in the 1920s in his memoir Memories and Adventures as "a volcanic Anglo—or rather Scot-American, with a violent manner, a wealth of strong adjectives, and one of the kindest natures underneath it all". Barr himself wrote several humorous articles about being a writer, including in 1899 "Literature in Canada", where he described it as a country whose "average citizen ... loves whiskey better than books".

== Writing style ==
Barr's short stories usually feature a witty narrator and an ironic twist. His novels tend to be episodic, the chapters often linked only by the central character. His work featured a wide range of protagonists, but his characters are often stereotyped. His narration often includes moral and other asides.

== Personal life and death ==
In August 1876, Barr married Ontario-born Eva Bennett. They had two children.

Barr died in Woldingham, Surrey, a village southeast of London, from heart disease on 21 October 1912.

== Honors ==
In 1900, Barr was awarded an honorary degree by the University of Michigan.

== Works ==
- In a Steamer Chair and Other Shipboard Stories (13 short stories, 1892): Gutenberg Library, Librivox
- The Face And The Mask (24 short stories, 1894): Gutenberg Library
- In the Midst of Alarms (a story of the 1866 attempted Fenian invasion of Canada, 1893), Gutenberg Library
- From Whose Bourne (novel, 1896) Gutenberg Library, Internet Archive
- One Day's Courtship (1896) Gutenberg Library
- Revenge! (20 short stories, 1896) Gutenberg Library, Librivox
- The Strong Arm Gutenberg Library
- A Woman Intervenes (novel, 1896) Gutenberg Library
- The Mutable Many (1896)
- Tekla: A Romance of Love and War (1898) Gutenberg Library
- Jennie Baxter, Journalist (1899) Gutenberg Library
- The Unchanging East (1900)
- The Victors (1901)
- A Prince of Good Fellows (1902) Gutenberg Library
- Over The Border: A Romance (1903)
- The O'Ruddy, A Romance, with Stephen Crane (1903) Gutenberg Library
- A Chicago Princess (1904)
- The Speculations of John Steele (1905)
- The Tempestuous Petticoat (1905–12)
- A Rock in the Baltic (1906) Gutenberg Library
- The Triumphs of Eugène Valmont (1906) Gutenberg Library
- The Measure of the Rule (1907)
- Young Lord Stranleigh (1908)
- Stranleigh's Millions (1909)
- The Sword Maker (historical novel, 1910) Gutenberg Library, Internet Archive
- The Palace of Logs (1912)
- The Ambassador's Pigeons (1899)
- And the Rigor of the Game (1892)
- Converted (1896)
- Count Conrad's Courtship (1896)
- The Count's Apology (1896)
- A Deal on Change (1896)
- The Exposure of Lord Stanford (1896)
- Gentlemen: The King!
- The Hour-Glass (1899)
- An invitation (1892)
- A Ladies Man
- The Long Ladder (1899)
- Mrs. Tremain (1892)
- Transformation (1896)
- The Understudy (1896)
- The Vengeance of the Dead (1896)
- The Bromley Gibbert's Story (1896)
- Out of Thun (1896)
- The Shadow of Greenback (1896)
- Flight of the Red Dog (fiction)
- Lord Stranleigh Abroad (1913)
- One Day's Courtship and the Heralds of Fame (1896)
- Cardillac

=== Sources ===
- Robert Barr Book List
- Books: Robert Barr – Project Gutenberg
- Bleiler, Everett (1948). The Checklist of Fantastic Literature. Chicago: Shasta Publishers. p. 41.
