= The Bedridden =

Australian band

- Origin: Canberra, Australia
- Genres: Indie; Folk-rock; Anti-folk; Punk
- Years active: 1989–1993, 1995–2002, 2005
- Labels: Round Records; Army of Nerds
- Past members: Barnaby "Baterz" Ward; Benjow; David M. Lewis; Spaemen; Kirsty Stegwazi; Lillybub; Andy Wiffler; David Wiffler; Razz Mussen; Alex Miller; Mahatt

The Bedridden was an Australian cult band that performed and recorded, somewhat sporadically, between 1989 and 2002. The Bedridden reunited for a series of concerts in 2005 to promote a live album that was recorded in 1998. The band were noted for regular break-ups and constant line-up changes. Song-writing and lead-vocal duties were shared amongst the members of the band, creating a somewhat eclectic style and an evolving sound due to the departure of key members. They created a strong fan base around the Australian pub rock scene, especially in Adelaide which was considered to be the home of the band.

== History ==
The group formed in 1989 in Canberra and quickly moved to Adelaide, where the band remained until Baterz's death in 2002. The original members were Baterz (guitar), David M. Lewis (guitar), Spaemen (Steven McKenzie) (bass guitar), Kirsty Stegwazi (guitar) and Lillybub (William Heuzenroeder) (cello).

The group recorded their first album It's All Fun And Games Until Someone Loses An Eye later in 1989 and it was eventually released through the Adelaide-based label Round Records in 1990. The album introduced some of the group's most well-remembered songs, including Bateman's Bay, Stephen McKenzie, and the Sesame Street tune Capital I.

With the release of their first album, the band toured the Australian cities of Canberra, Sydney, and Melbourne, developing a stronger fan base. Their second album, Big Scary Cow, was released in 1992, again through Round Records. This second collection featured Bedridden favourites including 2/11/1968, Midget, and their second Sesame Street cover, Born To Add.

Between 1993 and 1995, The Bedridden had their longest falling out. Some of the members pursued solo careers, most notably Baterz and Kirsty Stegwazi, and the band members were spread over several states within Australia. This was the longest period of inactivity from the group during Baterz's life.

By 1996 founding band member Baterz had developed an important name for himself as a solo artist. He invested in equipment to set up his own recording studio and label called Army of Nerds and, with recording gear in place, brought back various group members to record the third album as a band, I Told You it Wouldn't Work in 1998. The album had a much cleaner and defined sound, with stronger arrangements than seen before. The tracks included Agent of Satan, Darren Williams, and their most-recognised song The Drowning of the Daddo Brothers.

In various incarnations, which featured Baterz, Benjow, Dave Wiffler, Dave Lewis, Lillybub, and others, The Bedridden performed sporadic shows in Adelaide and Melbourne, perhaps every few months until late 2001. March 2002 saw the release of a new Bedridden single, Inland Sea, which was to herald a fourth album.

The fourth album never materialised (although most of it eventually appeared as Gorilla Gorilla Gorilla in 2013), due to the tragic and untimely death of Baterz at age 33. Baterz was a haemophiliac and, as a young teen, was diagnosed with HIV which he had contracted via a contaminated blood transfusion. In 2002, his condition worsened and lesions were discovered in his brain, affecting his coordination and forcing him to give up performing. Baterz died in July 2002. Triple J, the national youth radio network, broadcast a tribute to Baterz and his music on their Artery program. As Baterz was one of the main driving forces behind The Bedridden, the band stopped performing and the unfinished recordings were temporarily shelved.

In 2005, a new incarnation of The Bedridden performed a series of shows in Adelaide, Ballarat, and Melbourne to launch a live recording of the band - The Anthem of the Crown & Anchor, a collection of live recordings from performances in July 1998 in Ballarat and Melbourne.

In 2013, Army of Nerds released Gorilla Gorilla Gorilla, a 31-song album of previously unreleased tracks, including songs from almost every era of the band's career, from 1989 to 2005.

== Discography ==
=== Releases ===
- It's All Fun And Games Until Someone Loses An Eye album (1990, Round Records)
- Big Scary Cow album (1992, Round Records)
- I Told You It Wouldn't Work album (1998, Army of Nerds)
- Inland Sea EP (2002, Army of Nerds)
- The Anthem of the Crown & Anchor Live compilation (2005, Army of Nerds)
- Gorilla Gorilla Gorilla (Unreleased Recordings 1989-2005) (2013, Army of Nerds)
