= The Country of the Blind =

1904 short story by H. G. Wells

- Short story by H. G. Wells
- First edition cover of The Country of the Blind and Other Stories (1911)

Text available at Wikisource
- Country: United Kingdom
- Language: English
- Genre: Short story

Publication
- Published in: The Strand Magazine
- Media type: Print (Magazine)
- Publication date: April 1904

"The Country of the Blind" is a short story by English writer H. G. Wells. It was first published in the April 1904 issue of The Strand Magazine and included in a 1911 collection of Wells's short stories, The Country of the Blind and Other Stories. It is one of Wells's best known short stories, and features prominently in literature dealing with blindness.

Wells later revised the story, with the expanded version first published by an English private printer, Golden Cockerel Press, in 1939.

== Plot summary ==
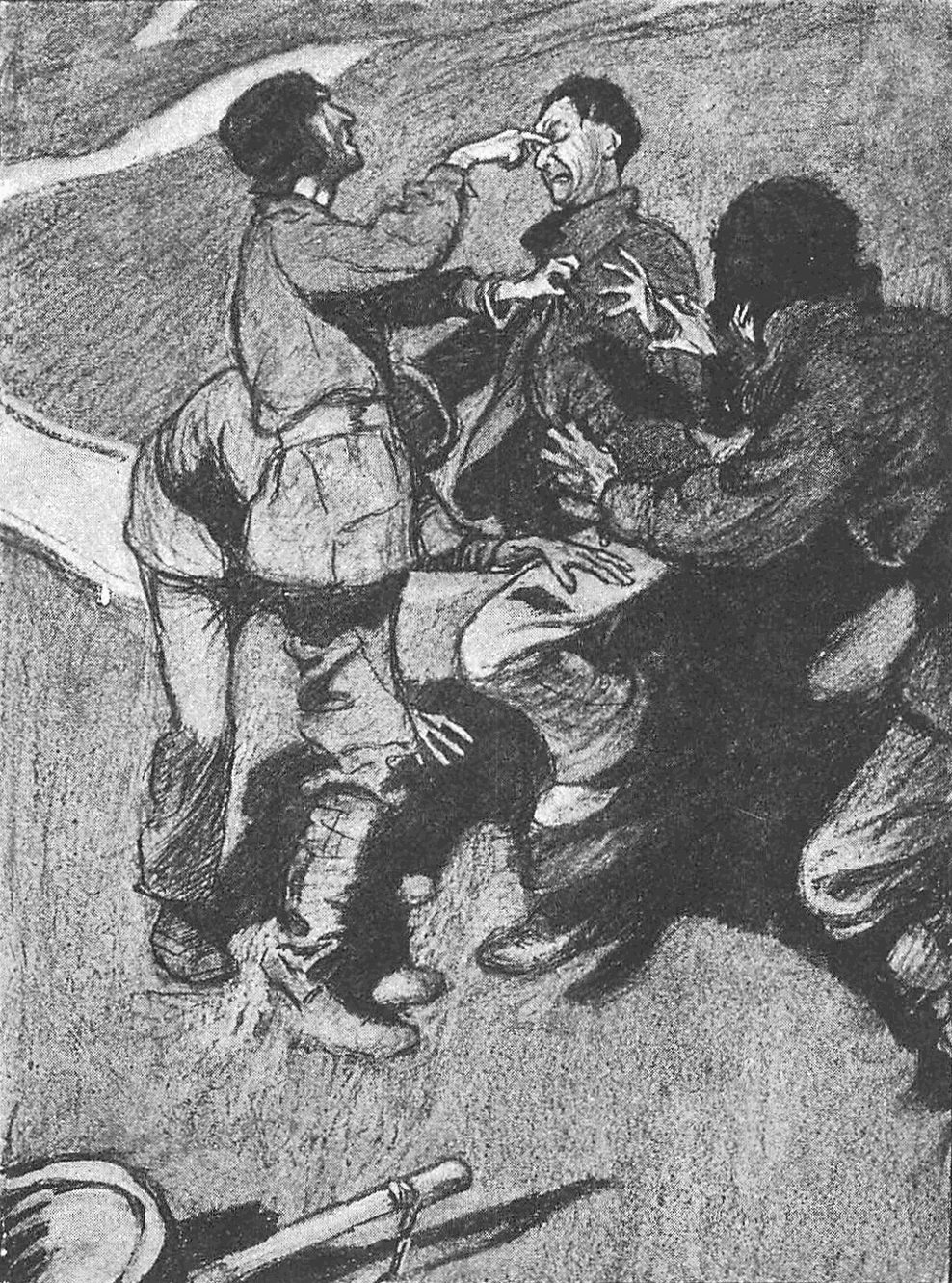
"'Carefully,' he cried, with a finger in his eye." – illustration by Claude Allin Shepperson from "The Country of the Blind", published in The Strand Magazine, April 1904

While attempting to climb the unconquered crest of Parascotopetl (a fictitious mountain in Ecuador), a mountaineer named Nuñez slips and falls down the far side of the mountain. At the end of his descent, down a snow-slope in the mountain's shadow, he finds a valley, cut off from the rest of the world on all sides by steep precipices. Unknown to Nuñez, he has discovered the fabled "Country of the Blind". The valley had been a haven for settlers fleeing the tyranny of Spanish rulers, until an earthquake reshaped the surrounding mountains, cutting the valley off forever from future explorers. The isolated community prospered over the years, despite a disease that struck them early on, rendering all newborns blind. As the blindness slowly spread over many generations, the people's remaining senses sharpened, and by the time the last sighted villager had died, the community had fully adapted to life without sight.

Nuñez descends into the valley and finds an unusual village with windowless houses and a network of paths, all bordered by kerbs. Upon discovering that everyone is blind, Nuñez begins reciting to himself the proverb, "In the Country of the Blind, the One-Eyed Man is King". (Note: Entry of the proverb into English. It appears that the first recorded usage of the proverb used in Wells' story in the English language comes about 150 years after the publishing of Erasmus' popular collection of proverbs. Erasmus wrote in Latin, and his version of the proverb appears to have entered common usage in Europe. George Herbert published in 1640 the book titled The Jacula Prudentum, or Outlandish Proverbs, Sentences, &c. Published semi-anonymously, Herbert's initials are on the title page. Herbert's version of the proverb is that "In the kingdom of blind men, the one-eyed is king." From that first published instance the proverb can be found in its variations in English language and literature. The English version is thought to be derived from the Spanish proverb: "En la tierra de los ciegos es el tuerto rey." The Spanish proverb is very old, with a slight variation dating from 1602: "Entre los ciegos el tuerto es Rey" – Among the blind, the one-eyed man is King, and a similar version from at least 1611: "Para que uno sea grande en un Reyno pequeño, poco es meneterpues: en la tierra de los ciegos el tuerto es Rey" – For one to be great in a small Kingdom, little is necessary: in the land of the blind the one-eyed man is King. The Spanish proverb may derive from an even earlier source in Portuguese, later translated into Spanish. Portuguese: "Em casa do cego, o torto é rei" – In the house of the blind, I'm the king. Spanish: "El casa del ciego, el tuerto es Rey" – In the house of the blind, the one-eyed is King. However, the earliest version of the proverb can be found in Collectanea adagiorum veterum, first publish by Desiderius Erasmus in 1500, and one of the most popular books of its time. Erasmus first quotes a Latin proverb: "Inter caecos regnat strabus" – Among the blind the squinter rules. He follows this with a Greek proverb that is similar, but then translates the Greek into Latin: "In regione caecorum rex est luscus" – In the land of the blind, the one-eyed man is king. So this appears to be the origin of the proverb in Latin-based languages.) He realizes that he can teach and rule them, but the villagers have no concept of sight (or of life outside of their valley), and do not understand his attempts to explain this fifth sense to them. Frustrated, Nuñez becomes angry, but the villagers calm him, and he reluctantly submits to their way of life, because returning to the outside world seems impossible.

Nuñez is assigned to work for a villager named Yacob. He becomes attracted to Yacob's youngest daughter, Medina-Saroté. Nuñez and Medina-Saroté soon fall in love, and having won her confidence, Nuñez slowly starts trying to explain sight to her. Medina-Saroté, however, simply dismisses it as his imagination. When Nuñez asks for her hand in marriage, he is turned down by the village elders on account of his "unstable" obsession with "sight". The village doctor suggests that Nuñez's eyes be removed, claiming that they are diseased and are "greatly distended" and because of this "his brain is in a state of constant irritation and distraction." Nuñez reluctantly consents to the operation because of his love for Medina-Saroté. However, at sunrise on the day of the operation, while all the villagers are asleep, Nuñez, the failed King of the Blind, sets off for the mountains (without provisions or equipment), hoping to find a passage to the outside world, and escape the valley.

In the original story, Nuñez climbs high into the surrounding mountains until night falls. Upon sunset "...he was not longer climbing, but he was far and high. His clothes were torn, his limbs were bloodstained, he was bruised in many places, but he lay as if he were at his ease, and there was a smile on his face. [...] he heeded these things no longer, but lay quite still there, smiling as if he were content now merely to have escaped from the valley of the Blind, in which he had thought to be King. And the glow of the sunset passed, and the night came, and still he lay there, under the cold, clear stars."

In the revised and expanded 1939 version of the story, Nuñez sees from a distance that there is about to be a rock slide. He attempts to warn the villagers, but again they scoff at his "imagined" sight. He flees the valley during the slide, taking Medina-Saroté with him.

== Characters ==
- Nuñez – a mountaineer from Bogotá, Colombia
- Yacob – Nuñez's master
- Medina-Saroté – the youngest daughter of Yacob

== Adaptations ==
Several radio adaptations of the story have been produced. Escape debuted its adaptation starring William Conrad on Thanksgiving week, 1947, which featured a different ending in which Nuñez escapes the Valley alone (and thus is able to tell the story in-character), but goes blind in the process due to the constant glare from the snow. Another episode of Escape aired 20 June 1948, starring Paul Frees. In 1954, 1957 and 1959 the CBS radio series Suspense rebroadcast this version. CBS Radio Mystery Theater aired another radio adaptation 7 May 1979. The episode was titled "Search for Eden" (episode 977) and the main characters' names were changed – Nunez was renamed Carlos and Medina-Saroté was renamed Eva. The BBC folded the story in two others by Wells for a BBC Radio 4 Extra entitled "The Door in the Wall", also with a twist at the end in which the storyteller reveals himself to be the tale's protagonist.

A teleplay written by Frank Gabrielsen was produced in 1962 for the TV series The DuPont Show of the Week. The title of the hour-long episode was "The Richest Man in Bogota", and it aired on 17 June 1962. It starred Lee Marvin as Juan de Nuñez, and Míriam Colón as "Marina" (not Medina-Saroté, as in the original story). In this story it is revealed that something in the water of the valley has caused the blindness of the residents. At the end of the episode Juan de Nuñez is shown to now be blind as well.

The Russian studio Soyuzmultfilm made a wordless 19-minute animated film adaptation in 1995 called Land of Blind (Страна Слепых).

The theme of the protagonist getting lost in the world of the blind was used in the 1997 Malayalam movie Guru starring Mohanlal.

The composer Mark-Anthony Turnage wrote a chamber opera based on the story, completed in 1997.

A stage production was written by Frank Higgins and Mark Evans; the only production to date has been in The Coterie Theater in Kansas City, Missouri in 2006.

A Chinese version of a graded reader was adapted under the name 盲人国 (Mángrén Guó) as part of the Mandarin Companion series. The location was adapted from Ecuador to China's province of Guizhou. A twist at the ending indicates the blindness condition affecting the people is contagious.

An audio version of "The Country of Blind" was published in the Indian language of Malayalam.

== See also ==
- Plato's Allegory of the Cave
- Tall poppy syndrome
