= The Argonauts of the Air =

- Short story by H. G. Wells
- Country: United Kingdom
- Genre: Science fiction

Publication
- Published in: Phil May's Annual
- Media type: Print
- Publication date: December 1895

"The Argonauts of the Air" is a short story by H. G. Wells, first published in 1895 in Phil May's Annual. It was included in the collection of Wells short stories The Plattner Story and Others, published by Methuen & Co. in 1897.

Written several years before the first flight of the Wright brothers, it describes the painstaking development of a flying machine, in the face of public amusement, and its unsuccessful trial flight over London.

Wells lived at one time in Worcester Park, where the machine is launched; he studied at the Royal College of Science, where it crashes.

== Story summary ==
For several years, Monson has used his wealth on a project to build a flying machine. The apparatus for launching it, "a massive alley of interlacing iron and timber", has become a notable landmark for people passing through Worcester Park in south-west London, and sometimes they see a machine rush along the rails of the apparatus, as the latest version of the flying machine is tested.

Monson's money is running out, and he is impatient with the time taken to put the latest modifications into effect. He is annoyed with the attitude of the public, who regard with amusement and indifference what is actually a painstaking and well-researched project, based on the work of Hiram Maxim and Otto Lilienthal. In particular he is annoyed by the remarks of a pretty young lady:

'How are you getting on with your flying-machine?' she asked. ('I wonder if I shall ever meet anyone with the sense not to ask that,' thought Monson.) 'It will be very dangerous at first, will it not?' ('Thinks I'm afraid.').... 'You must let me know when your flying-machine is finished, Mr. Monson, and then I will consider the advisability of taking a ticket.' ('One would think I was still playing inventions in the nursery.')

Monson and his engineer Woodhouse agree to try a flight. They know they will not be able to manage their flight instinctively, as a bird would do. Wimbledon, Primrose Hill and Kensington Gardens are some of the places which they fly over, all the while having difficulty controlling the machine. Eventually their luck runs out and they crash near the Royal College of Science.

So ends Monson's project. All that remains is the rusting ironwork at Worcester Park, and the inspiration for others to attempt creating flying machines.
