= The Red Room (short story) =

- Short story by H. G. Wells
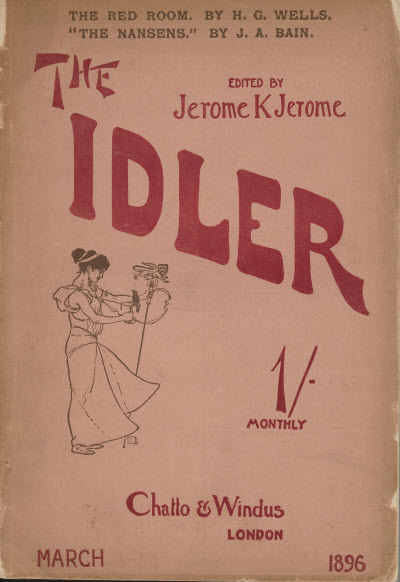

Text available at Wikisource
- Country: United Kingdom
- Genre: Gothic fiction

Publication
- Published in: The Idler
- Publication type: Periodical
- Publisher: Chatto & Windus
- Media type: Print (Magazine)
- Publication date: March 1896

"The Red Room" is a short Gothic story written by H. G. Wells in 1894. It was first published in the March 1896 edition of The Idler magazine.

== Summary ==
A main character chooses to spend the night in an allegedly haunted room, colored bright red in Lorraine Castle. He intends to disprove the legends surrounding it. Despite vague warnings from the three infirm custodians who reside in the castle, the narrator ascends to "the Red Room" to begin his night's vigil.

Initially confident, the narrator becomes increasingly uneasy in the room. He attempts to conquer his fear by lighting candles, but keeping the candles lit in the draughty room becomes an ongoing battle. Each time a candle is snuffed out, the narrator's fear and paranoia increases. He begins to imagine that the drafts are guided by a malevolent intelligence. As the narrator's fear intensifies, he stumbles onto a large piece of furniture (possibly the bed), and ricochets off the walls in a blind panic, hitting his head and eventually falling unconscious. The caretakers, who find him in the morning, feel vindicated when the narrator agrees that the room is haunted. They are eager to hear a description of the ghost, but he surprises them by explaining that there is no ghost residing in the room. The room is haunted by fear itself.

== Adaptations ==
Freddie Jones narrated the story in 1980 as part of the BBC Spine Chillers series.

The story is illustrated by Barry Moser as part of the 1998 children's book, Great Ghost Stories, complete with an afterword by Peter Glassman.
