= The Door in the Wall (short story) =

1906 short story by H. G. Wells

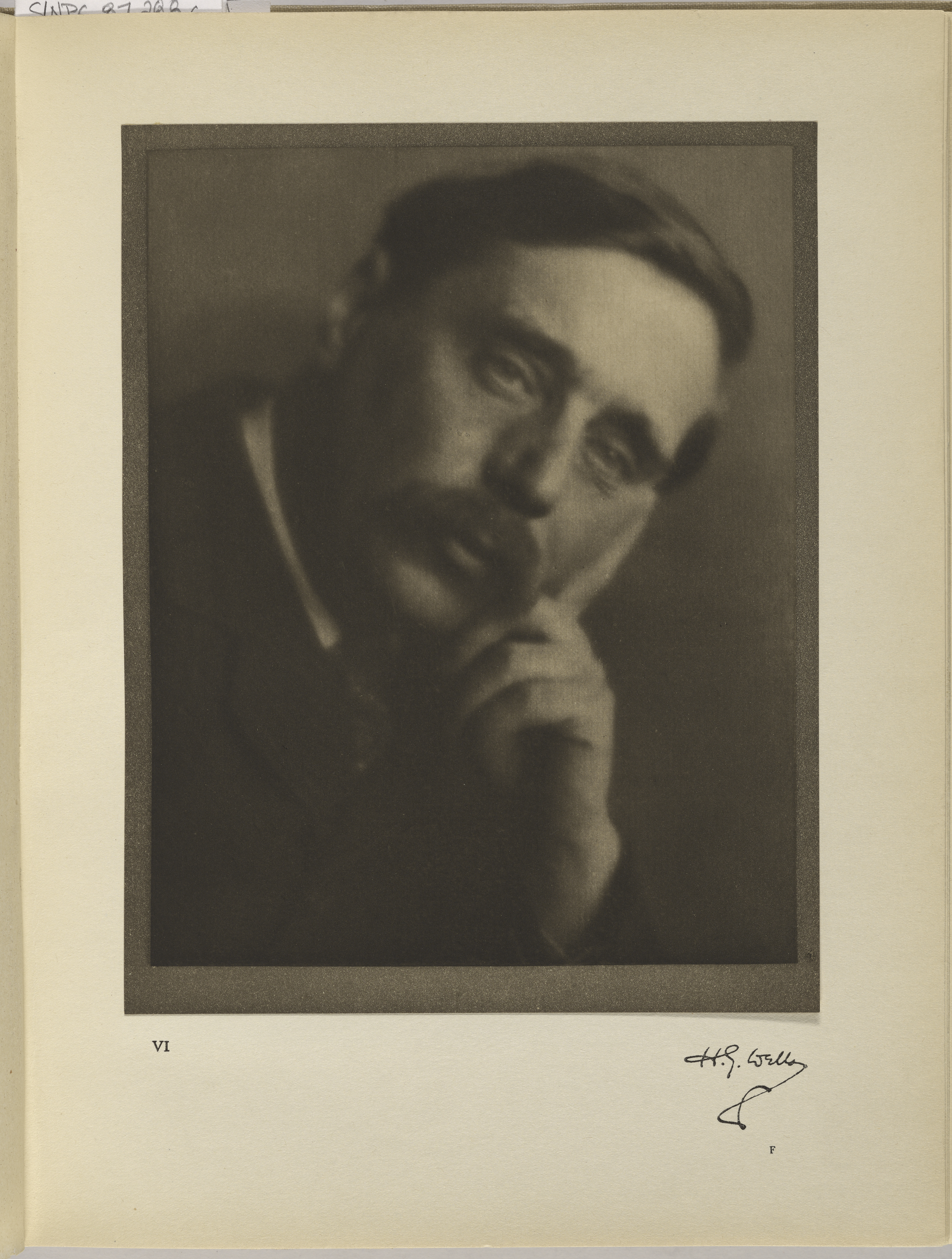
H. G. Wells, photographed by Alvin Langdon Coburn in 1905

"The Door in the Wall" is a short story by H. G. Wells first published in the Daily Chronicle in 1906 and first collected in his The Country of the Blind and Other Stories in 1911. It covers the whole life of a successful politician who has always been haunted by his memory of having in early childhood been welcomed into a paradisal garden of innocent happiness, access to which depends on finding by chance a particular door. Over the years he has several times rediscovered the door in different locations in London, but has always declined to enter, being distracted by some step in the advancement of his worldly career.

It is widely considered to be one of Wells's finest short stories, has influenced other writers, and has been filmed three times.

== Synopsis ==
The narrator begins by telling us that this story was told to him by an old schoolfellow of his, Lionel Wallace. After a period of doubt he has come to believe that Wallace was telling him the truth as he saw it. Wallace confesses that he is haunted by a memory of beauty and happiness that makes his life of worldly success pale by comparison. As a boy of about five years old, orphaned of his mother but given a good deal of freedom, he had once, when wandering through the streets of West Kensington, come across a white wall with a green door. Against his better judgement, he opened the door, walked through, and found himself in a beautiful garden where everyone was happy. He encountered two tame panthers and various friendly people, including a sombre, dark woman who showed him a book which contained the story of his life. When Wallace reached the point in the book where he discovered the green door, the garden disappeared and he found himself, distraught, back in the street. A policeman took him back home, but no-one there believed his story. Time passed, and he began to go to school.

One day, while on his way to school, Wallace discovered the door in the wall again, but was too worried about being late for school to go in. Later he told some of his schoolfellows about the garden, but they disbelieved him and challenged him to take them to see for themselves. However, he was unable to find it, either then or through the rest of his career at school.

The third time he found it was when he was 17, driving in a cab to Paddington. He did not stop the cab, being too intent on catching a train to Oxford to qualify for a scholarship. After Oxford he embarked on a successful political career, and once more encountered the door, this time near Earl's Court, but again he decided against going in since it would make him late for an appointment. He came increasingly to regret not taking any of his chances to return to the garden, and yet three times in the last year he has discovered the green door and passed it by. The first time was because he was hurrying to a crucial division in the House of Commons, the second was when he was on his way to his father's deathbed, and the third time, only a week ago, he was discussing his political future with men who could advance it. He now feels utterly hopeless that he will be given another chance of happiness.

The narrator ends by telling us that Wallace's body has just been found at the bottom of an excavation, and that he had in poor light walked through a small doorway that led onto it. Perhaps this shows that the green door in the wall never existed. "By our daylight standard he walked out of security into darkness, danger, and death. But did he see like that?"

== Publication ==
The Rare Book & Manuscript Library of the University of Illinois Urbana-Champaign holds two manuscripts of "The Door in the Wall", one dated 1905, and a typescript dated 1906. The story first appeared in the Daily Chronicle on 14 July 1906, and later in two 1911 H. G. Wells collections: The Country of the Blind and Other Stories, published in London by Thomas Nelson, and The Door in the Wall and Other Stories, published in New York by Mitchell Kennerley, this last a de luxe edition featuring photographs by Alvin Langdon Coburn and type designed by Frederic Goudy. It was also collected in The Short Stories of H. G. Wells (London: Ernest Benn, 1927).

== Criticism ==
"The Door in the Wall" read by Peter Eastman

"The Door in the Wall" was acclaimed from its first publishing. Writing in Le Temps in 1911, Henry Durand-Davray said that it was "Wells at his best". T. E. Lawrence, reviewing the 1927 Ernest Benn collection in The Spectator, called this story "a very lovely thing, [which] seems rather by itself, like a gloss on an E. M. Forster fragment". "Geoffrey West" (pseudonym of Geoffrey H. Wells) noted in 1926 that it was often considered Wells's best short story, and in 1930 added his own judgement that it was one of the works which "will carry his name even beyond our own century into that literary immortality he seems so anxious to avoid". Critics in the late 20th century and the 21st century have likewise evaluated it as one of Wells's finest short works. Adam Roberts wrote that:

The tone of this piece is exquisitely handled, and it remains one of the most affecting portraits of that palpable but indefinable sense of loss entailed by growing up...the way the petty business of living repeatedly get[s] in the way of recovering that childhood numinosity. And although it is a sad story (it is, indeed, one of the saddest I know) it is not a depressing story, because Wells understands that life is the myriad gettings-in-the-way that define our days, and the desire to get past that is actually the desire to stop living.

It has been seen as a nostalgic look back to the simplicity, continuity and easier pace of the Victorian age, or, more personally, to idyllic scenes in Wells's childhood. John R. Reed took from the story the lesson that life is like a book, never reaching an ordered state until its composition has been finished. Alfred Borrello believed it showed that our "very aspirations...can be the sources of self-delusion and ultimately doom if man understands them only as the means whereby he might escape from his duties to himself and to his race". Bernard Bergonzi found the story's garden unsatisfactory as a believable child's paradise. He saw the door as a womb symbol, the garden as "a return in fantasy to a pre-natal state", and Wallace's relationship with his father as Oedipal, while acknowledging that "The Door in the Wall" is not a systematic Freudian parable. His interpretation of Wallace's death was that it represented Wells's recognition of his own death as a creative artist, but W. Warren Wagar differed, writing that "Far more likely, Wells was advising his readers not to give way, like Wallace, to the seductions of unreason." The garden can be taken as a metaphor for the imagination which dramatizes for us the choice between the aesthetic and the practical sides of life, especially perhaps the choice between imaginative writing and political action faced by Wells himself in 1906. But perhaps, as Sabine Coelsch-Foisner has written, Wells makes the meaning of the supernatural garden motif a mystery to which there can be no final answer. "Was it a daydream, a lie, a sign of the boy's vivid imagination, or a token of a hidden dimension accessible only to a 'visionary' like Wallace?"

In The Weird and the Eerie (2016), Mark Fisher uses Wells's story as an example of the weird, illustrating how as an aesthetic mode the weird always requires there to be an opening or aperture between the familiar world and something other, but that this otherness need not be monstrous.

== Influence ==
Claims have been made for the influence of "The Door in the Wall" on, amongst others, T. S. Eliot's Four Quartets, Rebecca West's novel Harriet Hume, Julio Cortázar's story "La puerta condenada", and various works by Vladimir Nabokov, Valentin Kataev and Yury Olesha.

== Film adaptations ==
At least three short films have been based on Wells's story. The Door in the Wall (1956), an experimental film directed by Glenn H. Alvey Jr., starred Stephen Murray and Ian Hunter. Dver v stene (1990) was a Soviet animation directed by Boris Akulinichev. The Door (2011) was written and directed by Andrew Steggall, and the cast included Charles Dance and Harriet Walter.
