= Baterz =

- Born: Barnaby Charles Ward; 3 July 1969; Canberra, Australia
- Died: 22 July 2002 (aged 33) Adelaide, South Australia
- Occupations: Singer, Multi-instrumentalist
- Years active: 1989–2002
- Labels: Round Records; Army of Nerds
- Formerly of: The Bedridden
- Website: http://www.myspace.com/baterz

Barnaby Charles Ward, aka Baterz, (Canberra, July 3, 1969 - Adelaide, July 22, 2002) was an Australian musician. He was a founding member of cult band The Bedridden and a solo performer. Baterz was born with haemophilia, a hereditary disease which affects the ability of the blood to clot. In 1984 Baterz was diagnosed with HIV infection, contracted via a routine blood transfusion a year earlier. In 2002 he was diagnosed with progressive multifocal leukoencephalopathy and died in Adelaide on July 22.

A tribute album in 2009, Great Big Squiddy Fun, included recordings by Deborah Conway and Tex Perkins.

== Discography ==
=== With The Bedridden ===
- It's All Fun And Games Until Someone Loses An Eye album (1990, Round Records)
- Big Scary Cow album (1992, Round Records)
- I Told You It Wouldn't Work album (1998, Army of Nerds)

=== As Baterz ===
- Get Me a Fork cassette 1997
- Live at The Annandale cassette 1997
- Evil Stench cassette 1999
- The Blue Single (Target) CD 1999
- The Red Single (Darling) CD 1999
- The Yellow Single CD 2000
- Out Of Hell CD album 2000
- Goth CD single 2001
- Live and Well CD album 2001
- Armed Hold Up Song CD single
