= A Story of the Stone Age =

- Short story by H. G. Wells
- Country: United Kingdom
- Genres: Science fiction, prehistoric fiction

Publication

"A Story of the Stone Age" is a short story written in 1897 by H. G. Wells.

The story was featured in three parts between May and August 1897 in The Idler magazine, and was later released in collected editions. The story is set during the Stone Age, and tells of a caveman named Ugh-lomi, who bonds with the young woman Eudena and kills his rival, the de facto tribal leader Uya. Whilst in exile, Ugh-lomi becomes the first man to ride a horse, and to combine stone and wood to fashion an axe. He uses this weapon, along with his wits, to survive encounters with cave bears, hyenas and rhinos, and ultimately claim the position of tribal leader for himself.

== See also ==
- Doggerland – Former landmass in Northern Europe
