= A Story of the Days to Come =

"A Story of the Days To Come"
- Short story by H. G. Wells
- Country: United Kingdom
- Language: English
- Genre: Science fiction

Publication
- Published in: The Pall Mall Magazine
- Media type: Print (Magazine)
- Publication date: June–October 1899

"A Story of the Days To Come" is a novella by H. G. Wells comprising five chapters that was first published in the June to October 1899 issues of The Pall Mall Magazine. It was later included in an 1899 collection of Wells's short stories, Tales of Space and Time.

The novella depicts two lovers in a dystopian future London of the 22nd century and explores the implications of excessive urbanisation, class warfare, and advances in the technology of medicine, communication, transportation, and agriculture. Like When the Sleeper Wakes, published in the same year, the novella extrapolates the trends Wells observed in 19th-century Victorian London two hundred years into the future.

The London of the early 22nd century has a population of over 30 million, with the lower classes living in subterranean dwellings, and the middle and upper classes living in skyscrapers and largely communal accommodations. Moving walkways interconnect the city, with fast air-travel and superhighways available between cities. The countryside is largely abandoned.

Among other things, this novella appears to anticipate technical developments toward massive urbanisation, skyscrapers, moving sidewalks, superhighways, advertising, mass media, psychotherapy, and intercontinental aircraft traveling at jet speeds.

Socially and economically, however, it predicts a very stratified class structure and a largely communal society where few mega-corporations control all means of production. It also predicts hypnosis as a supplement or replacement to psychology, creches where child-rearing is transferred from parents to professionals, and a megapolis served by citywide moving walkways and escalators, with enormous cities (four in England) separated by abandoned countryside.

The story was adapted for BBC television by Ken Taylor, featuring Judi Dench and Dinsdale Landen, and was broadcast on 25 October 1966.

== Plot ==
A wealthy heiress falls in love with a middle-class worker of romantically quaint disposition. In part one, the woman's father hires a hypnotist to program his daughter to instead choose a more appropriate suitor selected by him. When that ploy is unravelled, the couple secretly marry and flee into the abandoned countryside and attempt to live off the land. After being driven back into the city, the couple live a modest middle-class lifestyle until their money runs out. At that point, they move to the "underneath" area of London to toil in physical labour as lower-class workers. Finally, their issues are resolved through the machinations of her spurned would-be suitor, and they resume a middle-class lifestyle.
