= The Idler (1892–1911) =

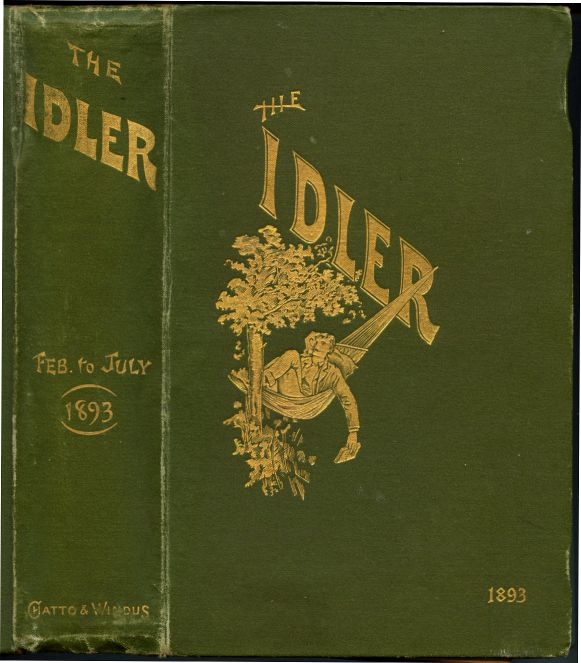
Cover for bound volumes of The Idler 1892 onwards.

The Idler was an illustrated monthly magazine published in Great Britain from 1892 to 1911. It was founded by the author Robert Barr, who brought in the humorist Jerome K. Jerome as co-editor, and its contributors included many of the leading writers and illustrators of the time.

== Content ==
The Idler generally catered to the popular taste, printing light pieces and sensational fiction. The magazine published short stories, serialised novels, humour pieces, poetry, memoirs, travel writing, book and theatre reviews, interviews and cartoons. It also included a monthly feature called 'The Idlers' Club', in which a number of writers would offer their views on a particular topic.

Most of The Idler's contributors were popular and prolific writers of the time. Some of them, such as Rudyard Kipling, Mark Twain and Ernest Bramah, are still read today.

== Editors ==
- February 1892 – July 1895: Jerome K. Jerome and Robert Barr
- August 1895 – November 1897: Jerome K. Jerome
- 1898–1901: Arthur Lawrence and Sidney Sime
- 1902–1911: Robert Barr

== Contributors ==
=== Writers ===
- William Livingston Alden
- Grant Allen
- R. M. Ballantyne
- Robert Barr
- Arthur William Beckett
- Max Beerbohm
- Marie Adelaide Belloc Lowndes as M. A. Belloc
- Aimée Daniell Beringer as Mrs. Oscar Beringer
- Walter Besant
- Raymond Blathwayt
- Mary Elizabeth Braddon
- Addison Bright
- Robert Buchanan
- G. B. Burgin
- Thomas Burke
- Hall Caine
- William Canton
- Albert Chevalier
- Roy Compton
- Marie Corelli
- May Crommelin
- Aleister Crowley
- Guy de Maupassant
- Arthur Conan Doyle
- William Arthur Dunkerley
- Archibald Forbes
- H. Rider Haggard
- Kirby Hare
- Bret Harte
- William Hope Hodgson
- Jerome K. Jerome
- Rudyard Kipling
- Arthur H. Lawrence
- Eliza Lynn Linton
- Katherine Mansfield
- Richard Marsh
- Frank Mathew
- David Christie Murray
- J. F. Nisbet
- Barry Pain
- Joseph Parker
- James Payn
- W. Pett Ridge
- Eden Phillpotts
- Arthur Quiller-Couch as 'Q'.
- Lilian Quiller-Couch
- Jean Richepin
- Morley Roberts
- Frederick William Robinson
- William Clark Russell
- Francis Saltus Saltus
- Evelyn Sharp
- Robert H. Sherard
- George Robert Sims
- Lincoln Springfield
- Robert Louis Stevenson
- Mark Twain
- Allen Upward
- Mary Augusta Ward as Mrs Humphry
- H. G. Wells
- Gleeson White
- John Strange Winter (Henrietta E. V. Stannard)
- Israel Zangwill

=== Artists ===
- Sydney Adamson
- Frank Barnard
- Lewis Baumer
- Aubrey Beardsley
- Thomas C.S. Benham
- Ada Bowley
- Alexander Stuart Boyd
- Frank Brangwyn
- Dion Clayton Calthrop
- Sydney Cowell
- Frank Cadogan Cowper
- Max Cowper
- Cynicus (Martin Anderson)
- A Hugh Fisher
- Archibald Stevenson Forrest (1869 - 1963)
- Frances L Fuller
- Florence Briscoe))
- Ernest Goodwin
- James Grieg
- John Gulich
- Louis Gunnis
- Hal Hurst
- B. J. Hutchinson
- George Wylie Hutchinson
- Ronald Ian
- Richard Jack
- Ernest M. Jessop
- J. Kerr Lawson
- H. R. Millar
- John Bernard Partridge
- Charles Pears
- Frederick Pegram
- Melton Prior
- Andrew Scott Rankin
- Robert Sauber
- Sidney Sime
- F. Sketchley
- Penryn Stanley
- Frederic Villiers
- Rob Wagner
- Louis Wain
- John L. Wimbush
