= Spade House =

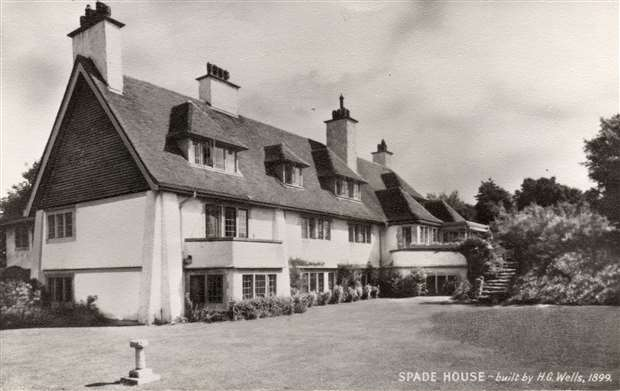

- Location within Kent
- 51.0747°N 1.1525°E
- Type: Country house
- Location: Sandgate, Kent

History
- Built: 1899-1903

Site notes
- Architect: C. F. A. Voysey
- Architectural style: Arts & Crafts
- Governing body: Privately owned

Listed Building – Grade II*
- Official name: Spade House
- Designated: 11 March 1975
- Reference no.: 1061164

Spade House, (now Wells House), is a large mansion overlooking Sandgate, near Folkestone, in southeast England. It was the home of the science fiction writer H. G. Wells from 1901 to 1909. Designed by C. F. A. Voysey, it is a Grade II* listed building.

== History ==
The house was designed by C. F. A. Voysey, and extended in 1903. Voysey included a signature heart shape on the door of every home he designed, but Wells rejected this in favour of a spade. H.G. and Catherine Wells' two sons were born here, and while living at Spade House Wells wrote books including Kipps, Tono-Bungay and Ann Veronica.

The house has been Grade II* listed on the National Heritage List for England since March 1975. It is now occupied by the "Wells House" nursing home. At the entrance is an ornate nameplate and a blue plaque from the Sandgate Society, commemorating the link to Wells.

== Gallery ==
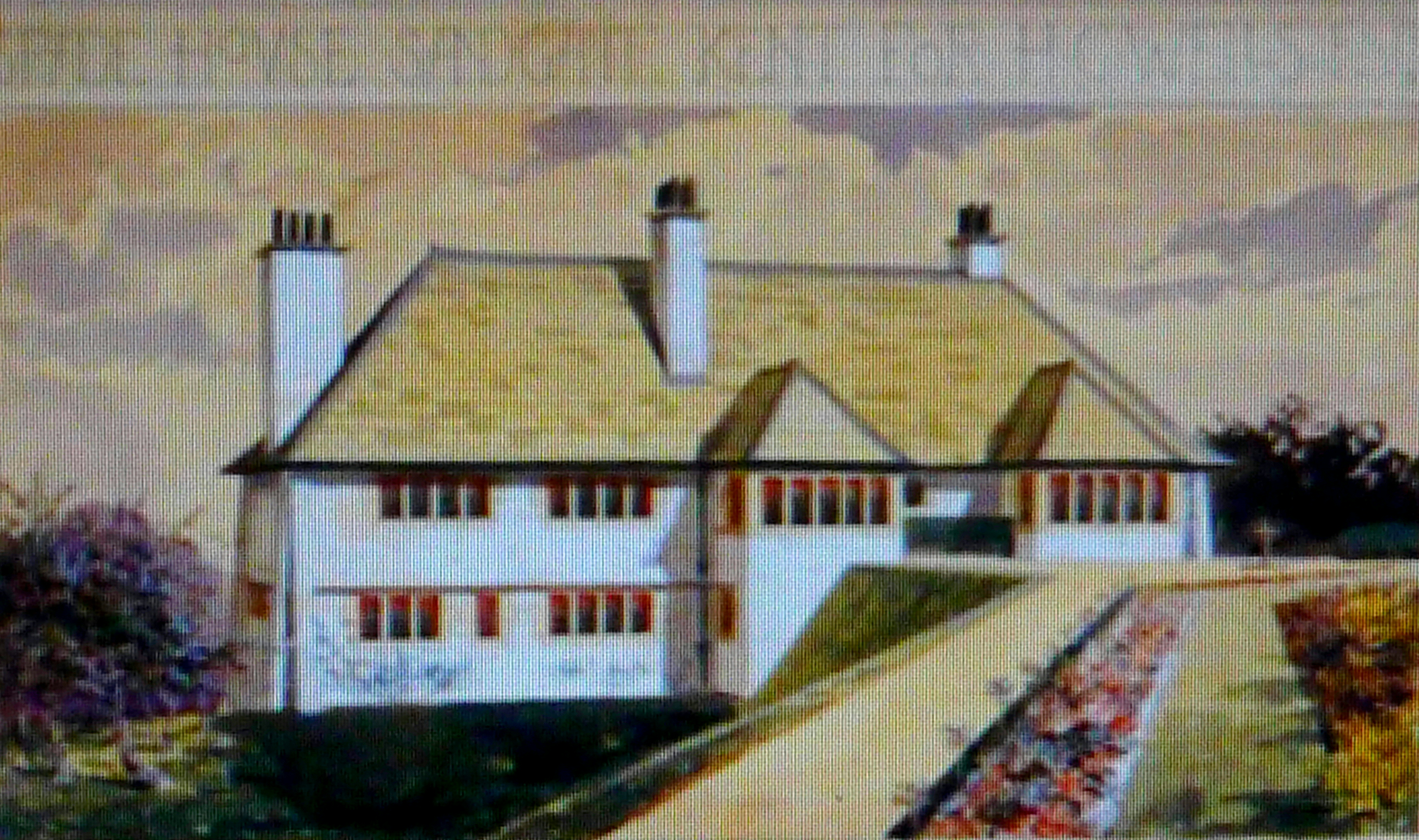
Vosey design

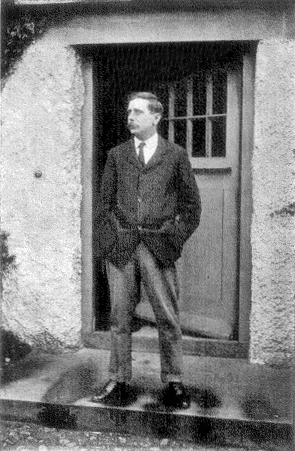
Wells at Spade House, 1907

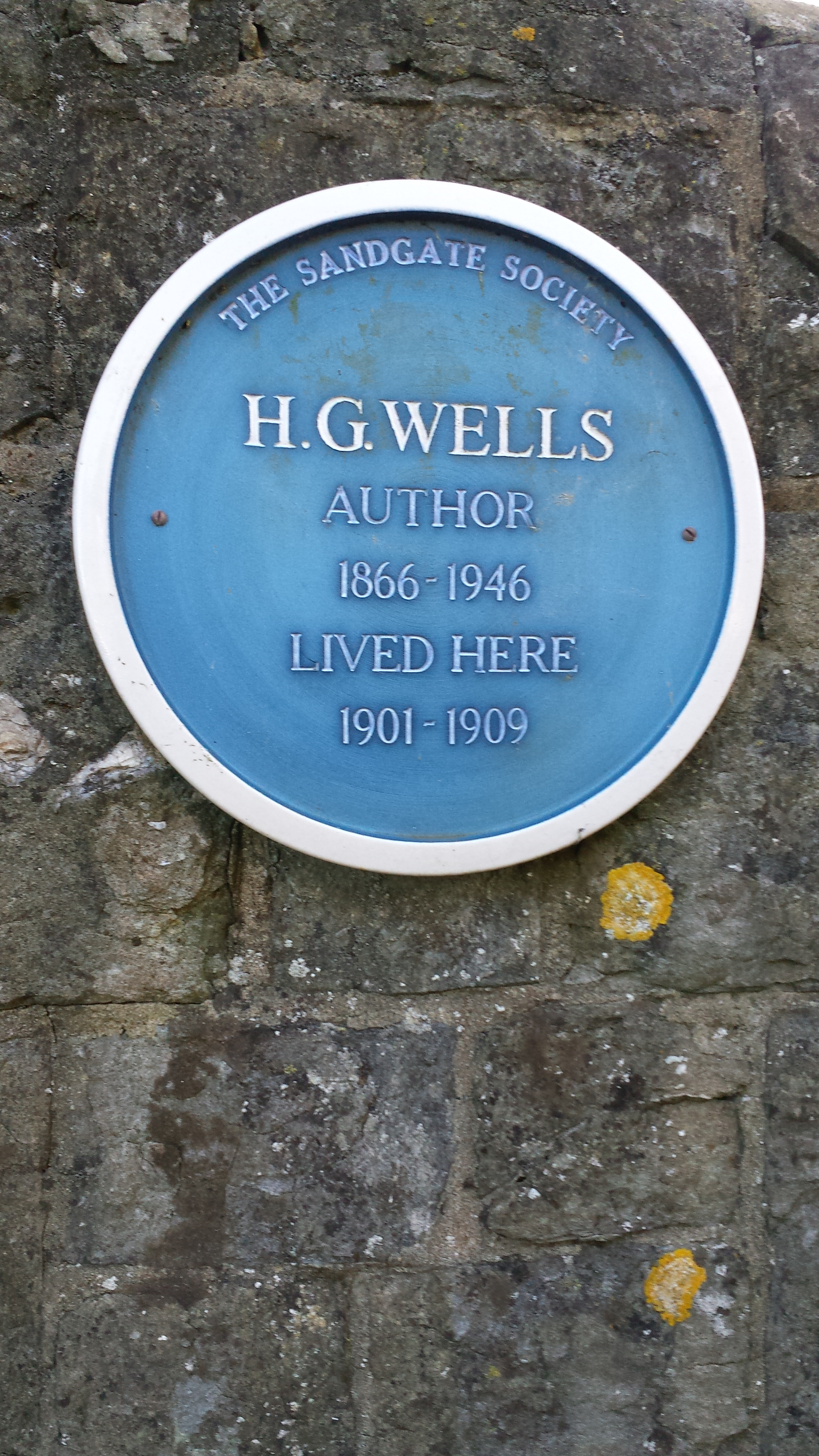
Blue plaque commemorating Wells
