= G. P. Wells =

British zoologist and author (1901–1985)

George Philip Wells
- Born: 17 July 1901
- Died: 27 September 1985 (aged 84)
- Occupations: Zoologist and author
- Parent(s): H. G. Wells (father); Amy Catherine Robbins (mother)

George Philip Wells FRS (17 July 1901 – 27 September 1985) was a British zoologist and author. A son of the author H. G. Wells, he co-authored, with his father and Julian Huxley, The Science of Life. A pupil at Oundle School, he was in the first class to learn Russian as a modern language in a British school. He accompanied his father to Soviet Russia in 1920, acting as his Russian translator and exchanging ideas with Russian zoology students. He won an entrance Exhibition to Trinity College, Cambridge, where he became Senior Scholar in his first year of residence.

Wells, a comparative physiologist, worked on invertebrates of several phyla. He determined their tolerance for changes in the salinity and the ionic balance of the surrounding water, and analysed the water relations of land gastropods.

For the latter part of his career he was a member of staff in the Zoology Department of University College London, eventually as professor. His main research was on the behavior of the lugworm Arenicola. He determined its habits by experiments, and showed that the rhythm which controls many of its activities arises in the oesophagus. Such spontaneous rhythmic activity was shown to occur in many polychaetes.

He was known to all by his nickname, Gip, and appears by this name in his father's fictional story "The Magic Shop". He was elected Fellow of the Royal Society in 1955.

Wells also published the 1971 (and last) edition of his father's The Outline of History in the wake of Raymond Postgate's death in March of that year. Postgate had revised four previous editions following H. G. Wells' death in 1946, published in 1949, 1956, 1961 and 1969. He also edited and published H. G. Wells in Love, his father's account of his main extramarital love affairs.
