= Certain Personal Matters =

1897 collection of essays by H. G. Wells

- First edition
- Author: H. G. Wells
- Original title: Certain Personal Matters: A Collection of Material, Mainly Autobiographical
- Language: English
- Genre: Essays
- Publisher: William Heinemann
- Publication date: 1897
- Publication place: United Kingdom

Certain Personal Matters is an 1897 collection of essays selected by H. G. Wells from among the many short essays and ephemeral pieces he had written since 1893. The book consists of thirty-nine pieces ranging from about eight hundred to two thousand words in length. A one-shilling reprint (two shillings in cloth) was issued in 1901 by T. Fisher Unwin.

The essays in Certain Personal Matters are written from a consistent first-person perspective, but only one describes an identifiable event in Wells's life—how he responded to being diagnosed with tuberculosis in the fall of 1887.

The other essays adopt the playful persona of an aspiring young writer living in modest circumstances with a wife, Euphemia, who is only sketchily and obliquely described. Their tone reflects the demands of the market in London magazines for "short essays, or short stories, often with a twist, which can be read in half a dozen minutes, but which will pique a reader's attention and ultimately allow him to think, 'How true. I have done that myself', or to make some similar remark."

More than half of the essays are humorous social satire; serious subjects are addressed only ironically. Politics, historical and economic topics, and identifiable portraiture are eschewed. Ten essays have literary themes, and in these, too, the point of view is humorous. One ("On Schooling and the Phases of Mr. Sandsome") gently critiques the choice of subjects studied in the course of primary and secondary education. Half a dozen essays engage scientific themes, especially natural selection and evolution, and in "The Extinction of Man" Wells shows he is contemplating themes that would be expressed in his next novel, The War of the Worlds: "Even now, for all we can tell, the coming terror may be crouching for its spring and the fall of humanity may be at hand."

== Composition and Publication ==
The essays in Certain Personal Matters rely on stock characters that Wells developed in his early days as a writer. This vein was inspired by his reading of When a Man's Single, an 1888 novel by J.M. Barrie, in which a character explains that saleable articles can be devised from everyday things like pipes, umbrellas, and flower pots. According to biographer David C. Smith, one character is "probably based on his father (and perhaps partly on his older brothers), another based on his mother apparently (although the character is always referred to as an 'aunt', which may be somewhat symbolic), and a third character, 'Euphemia'. This last is usually thought to be a portrait of Jane [Catherine] Wells, though the figure may have some traits of Isabel [Wells's cousin and first wife] as well."

"Wells naturally retained affection for the writings that had launched his career, so much so that he became embroiled in a furious dispute about the contents and title page with the publisher, who eventually had to call in Gissing to act as a mediator and persuade Wells to climb down."

Certain Personal Matters was well received; one critic called it "a very pleasant moneysworth, full of wit and humour." The book sold well and was never remaindered.

== Contents ==
The essays are presented approximately chronologically rather than thematically:

- "Thoughts on Cheapness and My Aunt Charlotte"
- "The Trouble of Life"
- "On the Choice of a Wife"
- "The House of Di Sorno: A Manuscript Found in a Box"
- "Of Conversation: An Apology"
- "In a Literary Household"
- "On Schooling and the Phases of Mr. Sandsome"
- "The Poet and the Emporium"
- "The Language of Flowers"
- "The Literary Regimen"
- "House-Hunting as an Outdoor Amusement"
- "Of Blades and Bladery"
- "Of Cleverness: Apropos of One Crichton"
- "The Pose Novel"
- "The Veteran Cricketer"
- "Concerning a Certain Lady"
- "The Shopman"
- "The Book of Curses"
- "Dunstone's Dear Lady"
- "Euphemia's New Entertainment"
- "For Freedom of Spelling: The Discovery of an Art"
- "Incidental Thoughts on a Bald Head"
- "Of a Book Unwritten"
- "The Extinction of Man"
- "The Writing of Essays"
- "The Parkes Museum"
- "Bleak March in Epping Forest"
- "The Theory of Quotation"
- "On the Art of Staying at the Seaside: A Meditation at Eastbourne"
- "Concerning Chess"
- "The Coal-Scuttle: A Study in Domestic Aesthetics"
- "Bagarrow"
- "The Book of Essays Dedicatory"
- "Through a Microscope: Some Moral Reflections"
- "The Pleasure of Quarreling"
- "The Amateur Nature Lover"
- "From an Observatory"
- "The Mode in Monuments: Stray Thoughts in Highgate Cemetery"
- "How I Died"
