= Tono-Bungay =

1909 novel by H. G. Wells

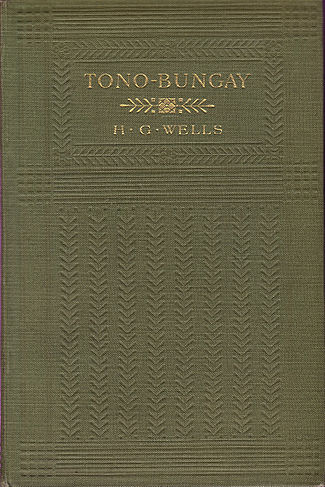
- First UK Edition Cover (1909)
- Author: H. G. Wells
- Language: English
- Genre: Novel
- Publisher: Macmillan
- Publication date: 1909
- Publication place: United Kingdom
- Media type: Print (hardcover)
- Text: Tono-Bungay at Wikisource

Tono-Bungay /ˌtɒnoʊˈbʌŋɡi/ is a realist semiautobiographical novel written by H. G. Wells and first published in book form in 1909. It has been called "arguably his most artistic book". It had been serialised before book publication, both in the United States, in The Popular Magazine, beginning in the issue of September 1908, and in Britain, in The English Review, beginning in the magazine's first issue in December 1908.

== Plot ==
George Ponderevo, the narrator and protagonist of the novel, is persuaded to help develop the business of selling Tono-Bungay, a patent medicine created by his uncle Edward. George devotes seven years to organising the production and manufacture of the product, even though he believes it is "a damned swindle". He then quits day-to-day involvement with the enterprise in favour of aeronautics, but he remains associated with his uncle, who becomes a financier of the first water and is on the verge of achieving social as well as economic dominance when his business empire collapses. George tries to rescue his uncle's failing finances by stealing quantities of a radioactive compound called "quap" from an island off the coast of West Africa, but the expedition is unsuccessful. George then engineers his uncle's escape from England in an experimental aircraft he has built, but the ruined entrepreneur turned financier catches pneumonia on the flight and dies in a village near Bordeaux, France, despite George's efforts to save him. The novel ends with George finding a new occupation: designing destroyers for the highest bidder.

== Themes ==
=== Scepticism about religion ===
George's resolve to struggle against "the whole scheme of revealed religion" is strengthened by his experience with his evangelical cousin at Chatham, Nicodemus Frapp, a baker to whom he is briefly "a fully indentured apprentice".

=== Socialism ===
George is influenced by Bob Ewart, a childhood friend and the son of an artist who becomes an artist himself, struggling against a system in which "[n]obody wants to do and be the things people are". It is Ewart who first interests George in socialism, but Ewart's socialism is detached, cynical and merely "discursive". (Here Wells was probably satirising the Fabian Society, which Wells had tried and failed to reorient between 1903 and 1906.) Ewart is important to George in that he "kept my fundamental absurdity illuminated for me during all this astonishing time [of working for the success of Tono-Bungay]."

=== Ennui ===
George struggles with ennui after breaking with Marion: "I suffered, I suppose, from a sort of ennui of the imagination. I found myself without an object to hold my will together. I sought. I read restlessly and discursively. . . . it seems to me as if in those days of disgust and abandoned aims I discovered myself for the first time. Before that I had seen only the world and things in it, had sought them self-forgetful of all but my impulse. Now I found myself GROUPED with a system of appetites and satisfactions, with much work to do – and no desire, it seemed, left in me. There were moments when I thought of suicide". George only partially resolves this moral crisis by, as he says, "idealis[ing] Science".

=== English society ===
George shares intimate details of his life with the reader. His uncle Edward, however, remains a somewhat flat character whose chief function is to symbolise the "wasting aimless fever of trade and money-making and pleasure-seeking" that became, in Wells's view, the most important social force in late-Victorian and Edwardian England. England is interpreted in the novel as a "social organism". The country estate of Bladesover, "up on the Kentish Downs," epitomises a "seventeenth-century system" which offers "the clue to all England. . . . There have been no revolutions, no deliberate restatements or abandonments of opinion in England since the days of the fine gentry, since 1688 or thereabouts, the days when Bladesover was built; there have been changes, dissolving forces, replacing forces, if you will; but then it was that the broad lines of the English system set firmly. . . . The fine gentry may have gone; they have indeed largely gone, I think; rich merchants may have replaced them, financial adventurers or what not. That does not matter; the shape is still Bladesover". Bladesover was based on Uppark, on the South Downs, where Wells's mother worked.

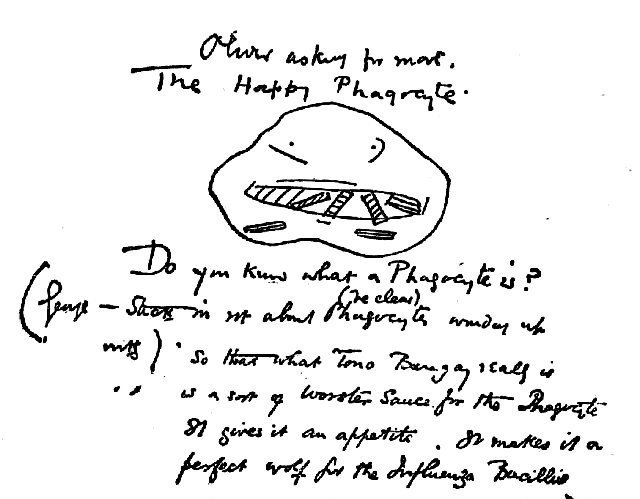
A drawing by H. G. Wells from the novel

This society has fallen prey to shabby forces of greed and acquisition that are embodied by Edward Ponderevo, who idealises Napoleon and who muses superficially about "[t]his Overman idee, Nietzsche—all that stuff." The trashy emptiness of Edward's ideal of life is expressed in his absurd attempt to build a vast mansion at Crest Hill. The character may have been based on the fraudster Whitaker Wright.

As a Bildungsroman, Tono-Bungay also explores the development of the narrator's emotional life. Three sexual relationships are analysed: his unsuccessful marriage to Marion; his affair with the liberated Effie; and his doomed relationship with Beatrice Normandy, a belle dame sans merci whom he has known since childhood and who loves but refuses to marry him. George also tells of his frustrated love for his stern, austere mother, who was a domestic servant, and his powerful attachment to his aunt Susan, a character whose depiction may be, in part, a portrait of Wells's second wife, Amy Catherine Robbins (better known as Jane).

=== Metaphysics ===
So powerful have corrupting social forces become that they overcome and denature George's life, for while in his youth he was capable of virtue, love and creativity, he finds no ideal he can devote himself to. Instead he becomes the fabricator of powerful machines whose destructive potential can only be guessed at. The concluding chapter, "Night and the Open Sea", depicts a test run of the X2, a destroyer that George has designed and built. The vessel becomes a symbol of a metaphysical "something" that "drives", that "is at once human achievement and the most inhuman of all existing things".

== Reception and criticism ==
Initial reviews were mixed. The novel was criticised by Hubert Bland and Robertson Nicoll, but the Daily Telegraph praised it as "a masterpiece". Gilbert Murray praised the book in three separate letters to the author, comparing Wells to Leo Tolstoy. Biographer Vincent Brome has written that "Tono-Bungay came fresh and vivid to men and women of Wells's generation. These great questionings, the challenge to one eternal verity after another, shook their world and their way of life, and it was all tremendously exciting".

Wells himself was "disposed to regard Tono-Bungay as the finest and most finished novel upon the accepted lines" that he had "written or was ever likely to write".

In the view of one of Wells's biographers, David C. Smith, Kipps, The History of Mr Polly and Tono-Bungay together make it possible for Wells "to claim a permanent place in English fiction, close to Dickens because of the extraordinary humanity of some of his characters, but also because of his ability to invoke a place, a class, a social scene. These novels are very personal as well, treating aspects of Wells's own life, matters which would come under attack later, but only after he added his sexual and extramarital views to the personal side of his work."

The book was praised by H. L. Mencken in "Prejudices, First Series".
