= Catherine Wells =

English writer and poet (1872–1927)

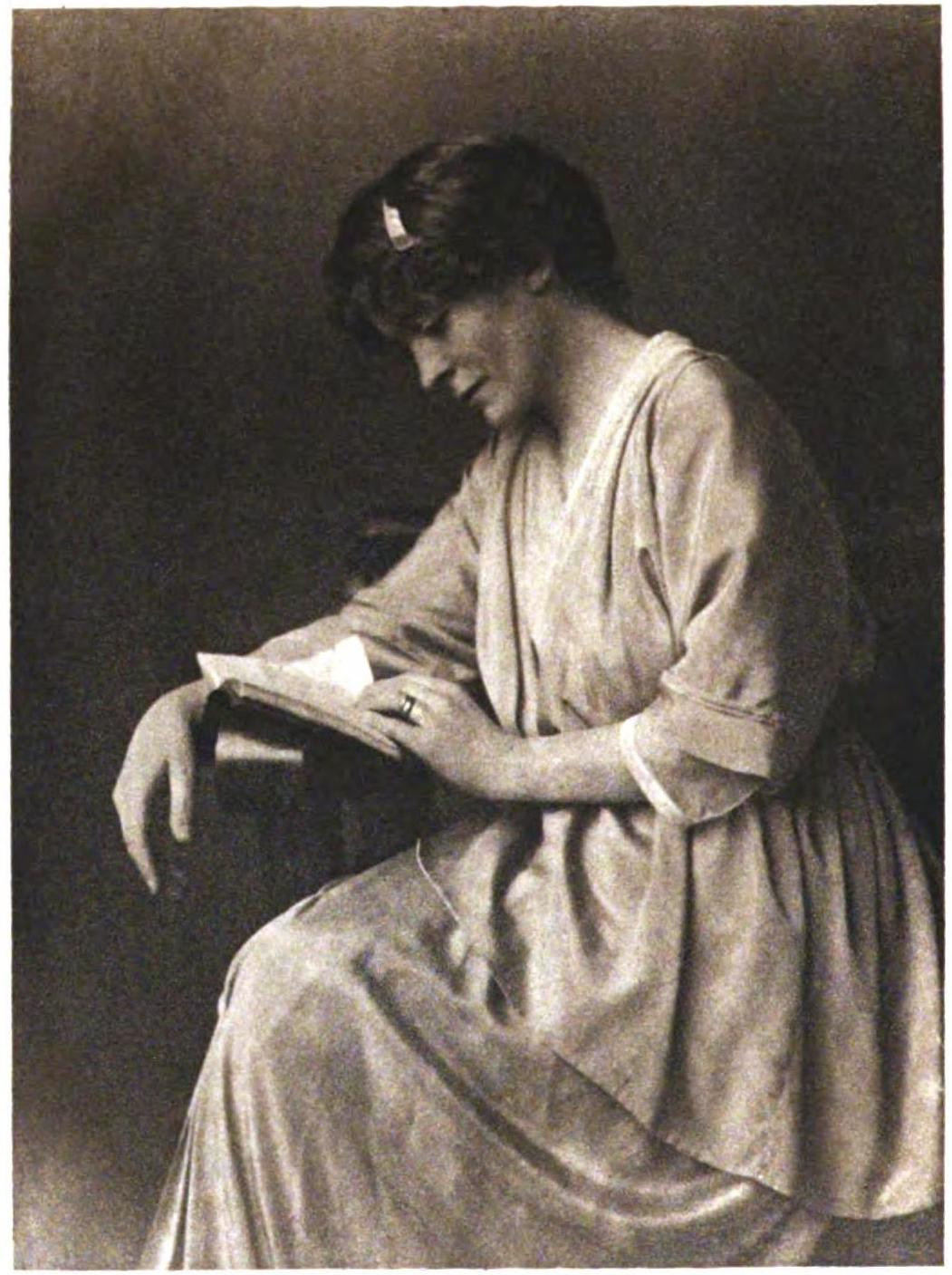
- Wells in 1914
- Born: Amy Catherine Robbins; 8 July 1872; Islington, London
- Died: 6 October 1927 (aged 55)
- Resting place: Golders Green Crematorium
- Occupations: Writer, poet
- Spouse: H. G. Wells (m. 1895)
- Children: 2, including G. P.

Amy Catherine Wells (née Robbins; 8 July 1872 – 6 October 1927) was an English writer and poet. She was a former student of H. G. Wells, to whom she was married from 1895 until her death.

== Life ==
Amy Catherine Robbins was born in Islington, London, on 8 July 1872, the daughter of Frederick and Maria Catherine Robbins.

She was described as "fragile figure, with very delicate features, very fair hair, and very brown eyes". Following the death of her father, she undertook degree study in order to become a teacher. She was a student of H. G. Wells at the Tutorial College in Holborn, and they married on 27 October 1895. They lived initially in Camden Town and Sevenoaks, and later at Woking and Worcester Park in Surrey. Their household in Worcester Park was portrayed by Dorothy Richardson in Pilgrimage (1915). Richardson had been a schoolfriend of Catherine Wells. The couple were known to their friends as H. G. and Jane.

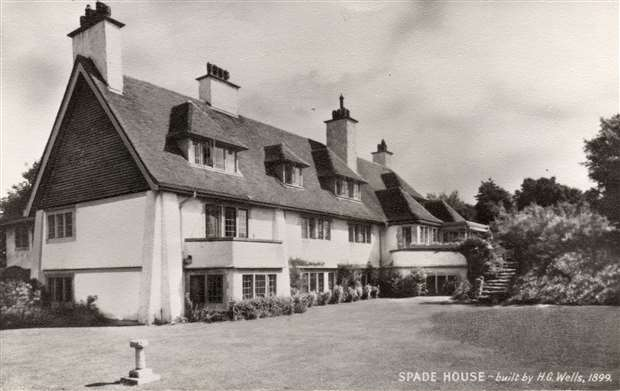
Spade House, home of the Wells family from 1900

In 1900, they moved to Spade House, a home built for them and designed by architect C. F. A. Voysey. They had two sons: George Philip (born 1901) and Frank Richard (born 1903). The Times described Catherine Wells as "her husband's devoted friend and assistant", and "one of the very few transcribers who could read the odd mixture of longhand and shorthand in which he wrote his books", adding that she showed a business acumen which supported her husband. Her own literary output, they wrote, "was necessarily restricted by her domestic responsibilities".

== Writings ==
During her lifetime, Catherine Wells had a small number of writings published. Reviewing her stories (published posthumously in The Book of Catherine Wells), Katherine Anne Porter wrote that Catherine Wells' writing was partly a reaction against her identity being subsumed to domestic life and overshadowed by H. G. Wells. Porter argued that:

this indefatigable woman asked for one thing more. She asked for one fragment of her mind to use as she liked. She resolutely set herself to write... [and] the stories offer a strange contrast to the portrait her husband gives.

Sylvia Lynd in The Daily News described the collection as offering:

a sense of the short story as a medium for revealing life rather than for surprising the reader... There is so much insight, so much observation, so much courage, so much compassion in them. Their writer was too good an artist to succeed as a magazine writer, perhaps too good a magazine writer to please herself as an artist.

The Civil & Military Gazette wrote that "For lightness of touch: power of making her readers see what she sees: and almost uncanny insight, these short stories can scarcely be surpassed".

== Death and legacy ==
Catherine Wells died from cancer on 6 October 1927. Her funeral at Golders Green Crematorium was led by T. E. Page, using a service written by H. G. Wells. He had based this on the secular ceremony script created by humanist and educationist F. J. Gould. Attendees included George Bernard Shaw and Arnold Bennett. In an obituary in The Times, Catherine Wells was described as having been "an admirable hostess... [with] a pretty sense of humour":

Nor was her benevolence confined to her home, which she made an abiding centre of harmony and good-will. For she was always ready to help any lame dog over a stile in the most tactful and unobtrusive manner.

Following her death, H. G. Wells collected Catherine's poetry and short stories for publication.The Book of Catherine Wells was published by Chatto & Windus in 1928.

Fifteen pocket-book diaries kept by Catherine Wells are held in the archives of University of Illinois Urbana-Champaign.
