= Joseph Wells (cricketer) =

English cricketer

Cricket information
- Batting: Right-handed
- Bowling: Right-arm roundarm fast

Career statistics
Competition	First-class
Matches	8
Runs scored	48
Batting average	4.36
100s/50s	0/0
Top score	10
Balls bowled	453
Wickets	15
Bowling average	9.14
5 wickets in innings	1
10 wickets in match	0
Best bowling	6/35
Catches/stumpings	6/−
- Source: CricInfo, 11 March 2017

Joseph Wells (14 July 1828 – 14 October 1910) was an English cricketer and father of the noted author H. G. Wells.

== Life ==
Wells was born at Penshurst Place in Kent. His uncle was Timothy Duke, a Penshurst bat and ball manufacturer.

He married Sarah Neal, a former domestic servant who was housemaid at Uppark in West Sussex between 1850 and 1855 (later she was re-employed as housekeeper from 1880 to 1893). Joseph was the head gardener at Uppark in 1851 and married Sarah in 1853. An inheritance allowed them to acquire a shop selling china and sporting goods, although it failed to prosper: the stock was old, and the location poor. Wells earned a meagre income, but little of it came from the shop; Joseph also received unreliable earnings from playing professional cricket for the Kent county team. Payment for skilled bowlers and batsmen came from voluntary donations after the matches, or from small payments from the clubs where the matches were played.

Wells was the first bowler to take four wickets in four balls in a first-class cricket match: in 1862 he dismissed Sussex's James Dean, Spencer Leigh, Charles Ellis and Richard Fillery with successive balls. (Spencer Leigh was the great-nephew of Jane Austen.) In 1866, while living at Atlas House, 46 High Street, Bromley, the couple had their fourth and last child "Bertie", who later became the author H. G. Wells.

Wells died at Liss in Hampshire.

== Bibliography ==
- Carlaw, Derek (2020). Kent County Cricketers, A to Z: Part One (1806–1914) (PDF). Cardiff: ACS.
