= The Science of Life =

1929 book by H. G. Wells, Julian Huxley and G. P. Wells

- First publication
- Author: H. G. Wells, Julian S. Huxley, and G. P. Wells
- Language: English
- Genre: Non-fiction
- Publisher: Cassels (England); Nelson Doubleday (US)
- Publication date: 1929
- Publication place: UK
- Media type: Print (hardback)
- Pages: 1514 (Cassell 1938 edition: 1575 pages, 32 plates, 263 figures)

The Science of Life is a book written by H. G. Wells, Julian Huxley and G. P. Wells, published in three volumes by The Waverley Publishing Company Ltd in 1929–30, giving a popular account of all major aspects of biology as known in the 1920s. It has been called "the first modern textbook of biology" and "the best popular introduction to the biological sciences". Wells's most recent biographer notes that The Science of Life "is not quite as dated as one might suppose".

In undertaking The Science of Life, H. G. Wells, who had published The Outline of History a decade earlier, selling over two million copies, desired the same sort of treatment for biology. He thought of his readership as "the intelligent lower middle classes ... [not] idiots, half-wits ... greenhorns, religious fanatics ... smart women or men who know all that there is to be known".

Julian Huxley, the grandson of T. H. Huxley under whom Wells had studied biology, and Wells' son "Gip", a zoologist, divided the initial writing between them; H. G. Wells revised, dealt (with the help of his literary agent, A. P. Watt) with publishers, and acted as a strict taskmaster, often obliging his collaborators to sit down and work together and keeping them on a tight schedule. (H. G. Wells had begun the book during his wife's final illness and is said to have used work on the book as a way to keep his mind off his loss.)

The text as published is presented as the common work of a "triplex author". H. G. Wells took 40% of the royalties; the remainder was split between Huxley and Wells's son. In his will, H. G. Wells left his rights in the book to G. P. Wells.

In 1927, Huxley gave up his chair of Zoology at King's College, London to concentrate on the work. Thanks to the success of the book, Huxley was able to give up teaching and devote himself to administration and experimental science.

The book was originally serialised in 31 fortnightly parts, published in 3 volumes in 1929–30 and in a single volume in 1931. The volume includes more than 300 illustrations. It was a great success, though the stock market crash and subsequent depression held back sales, in part because of declining memberships in book clubs.

It has been said of Book Four (The How and Why of Development and Evolution) that it "offers perhaps the clearest, most readable, succinct and informative popular account of the subject ever penned. It was here that [Huxley] first expounded his own version of what later developed into the evolutionary synthesis".

The Science of Life is also notable for its introduction of modern ecological concepts. It is also notable for its emphasis on the importance of behaviorism and Jung's psychology. Toward the end The Science of Life strays from the scientific to the moral realm and devotes a chapter (Book Eight, Ch. VIII: "Modern Ideas of Conduct") to practical moral advice to the reader, advising him (the masculine pronoun is used throughout, a universal practice circa 1930): "After his primary duties to himself, the first duty of Mr. Everyman to others is to learn about himself, to acquire poise and make his persona as much of a cultivated gentleman as he can. He has to be considerate. He has to be trustworthy." In its last pages, Wells emphasises the lack of "credibility" of personal immortality, and advocates "realization of [one's] participation in a greater being with which he identifies himself", whether this be "the Deity" or "Man".

== Publication record ==
The Science of Life: a summary of contemporary knowledge about life and its possibilities was first issued in 31 fortnightly parts published by Amalgamated Press in 1929–30, bound up in three volumes as publication proceeded. A mail-order version of the book was also published, though this was dropped after the stock market crash. It was first issued in one volume by Cassell in 1931, and reprinted in 1934 and 1937; a popular edition, fully revised, with a new preface by H. G. Wells, appeared in 1938. It was again published as separate volumes by Cassell in 1934–1937: I The living body. II Patterns of life (1934). III Evolution—fact and theory. IV Reproduction, heredity and the development of sex. V The history and adventure of life. VI The drama of life. VII How animals behave (1937). VIII Man's mind and behaviour. IX Biology and the human race. In New York, it was published by Doubleday, Doran & Co. in 1931, 1934 and 1939; and by The Literary Guild in 1934. Doubleday also issued a four-volume limited edition of the work in 1931, limited to 750 sets, with the first volume autographed on the limitation page by the three authors. Three of the Cassell spin-off books were also published by Doubleday in 1932: Evolution, fact and theory; The human mind and the behaviour of Man; Reproduction, genetics and the development of sex. The Science of Life was translated into French. During World War II a one-volume edition designed for use in military classes was issued. As late as 1960 the work was still being used in college classes in the US

Of historic interest is Book Three – The Incontrovertible Fact of Evolution, comprising five chapters; I. The fact to be proved, II. The evidence in the rocks, III. The evidence from plant and animal structure, IV. The evidence from the variation and distribution of living things, V. The evolution of Man. Considering that this was written less than five years from the Scopes Trial, it is a bold, comprehensive account of the scientific knowledge of evolution at the time. Book Four concentrates on the controversies about evolution concluding that "the broad positions of Darwinism emerge from a scrutiny of the most exacting sort, essentially unchanged".

The section entitled "The Ecological Outlook" anticipates many of the themes of the later green movement, including stressing the importance of reducing pollution and protecting endangered species from extinction, as well as the importance of alternative power sources.

The reference given is the most complete available, but there may have been other publishers and dates, and some books may have been given alternative titles. There are editions in some other languages.

== Outline ==
- Introduction
  - The Range, Nature, and Study of Living Things 1
- Book One—The Living Body
  1. The Body is a Machine 24
  2. The Complex Body-Machine and How It Works 32
  3. The Harmony and Direction of the Body-Machine 97
  4. The Wearing Out of the Machine and Its Reproduction 140
- Book Two—The Chief Patterns of Life
  1. The First Great Phylum: Vertebrates 168
  2. The Second Great Phylum: The Arthropods 194
  3. Further Patterns of Individualized Animal Life 210
  4. Less Individualized Animals 235
  5. Vegetable Life 253
  6. The Lowly and Minute 268
  7. Is our Knowledge of the forms of life complete? 311
- Book Three—The Incontrovertible Fact of Evolution
  1. The Fact to be Proved 314
  2. The Evidence of the Rocks 318
  3. The Evidence from Plant and Animal Structure 356
  4. The Evidence from the Variation and Distribution of Living Things 374
  5. The Evolution of Man 402
- Book Four—The Hows and the Why of Development and Evolution
  1. The Essence of the Controversies about Evolution 425
  2. How Individuals Originate 433
  3. The Mechanism of Inheritance 459
  4. The A B C of Genetics 468
  5. The Growth of the Individual 508
  6. What Determines Sex 552
  7. Variation of Species 576
  8. Selection in Evolution 600
  9. Is there a mystical Evolutionary Urge? 629
- Book Five—The History and Adventures of Life
  1. The Prologue 644
  2. Life Before Fossils 660
  3. The Era of Crawling and Swimming 675
  4. Life Conquers the Dry Land 701
  5. The Full Conquest of the Land 738
  6. The Modern Era 774
  7. Man Dawns Upon the World 796
- Book Six—The Spectacle of Life
  1. Habitats 823
  2. Life in the Sea 839
  3. Life in Fresh Water and on Land 878
  4. Some Special Aspects of Life 922
  5. The Science of Ecology 961
  6. Life Under Control 1012
- Book Seven—Health and Disease
  1. Infectious and Contagious Disease 1033
  2. The Nourishment of the Body 1054
  3. Fresh Air and Sunlight 1076
  4. The Present Health of Homo Sapiens 1089
- Book Eight—Behavior, Feeling, and Thought
  1. Rudiments of Behaviour 1102
  2. How Insects and Other Invertebrates Behave 1147
  3. The Evolution of Behaviour in Vertebrates 1200
  4. Consciousness 1270
  5. The Culminating Brain 1278
  6. The Cortex at Work 1288
  7. Human Behaviour and the Human Mind 1318
  8. Modern Ideas of Conduct 1390
  9. Borderland Science and the Question of Personal Survival 1411
- Book Nine—Biology of the Human Race
  1. Peculiarities of the Species Homo Sapiens 1436
  2. The Present Phase of Human Association 1454
- Index 1481–1515

The pagination is that of the 1934 Literary Guild edition.
