= Select Conversations with an Uncle =

1895 short story collection by H. G. Wells

- First edition title page
- Author: H. G. Wells
- Original title: Select Conversations with an Uncle (Now Extinct) and Two Other Reminiscences
- Language: English
- Genre: Essays
- Publisher: John Lane
- Publication date: 1895
- Publication place: United Kingdom
- Pages: 117
- Preceded by: Honors Physiography
- Followed by: The Time Machine: An Invention

Select Conversations with an Uncle, published in 1895, was H. G. Wells's first literary publication in book form. It consists of reports of twelve conversations between a fictional witty uncle who has returned to London from South Africa with "a certain affluence," as well as two other conversations (one on aestheticism that takes place in a train, titled "A Misunderstood Artist," and another on physiognomy, titled "The Man with a Nose").

== Themes ==
The principal themes of the conversations between a Wells-like character named "George" and his uncle are fashion, the inevitability of human "discomfort" due to passing social movements, the resemblance of ideals to interior decoration, the art of being photographed, the social basis of taste in art and music, the state of being engaged, the agony of having to listen to a near neighbor playing the piano, tricycles, social novels, and the effects of marriage.

== Contents ==
These are the short stories contained in this collection showing the periodicals in which they were first published.

- "Of Conversation and The Anatomy of Fashion"
- "The Theory of The Perpetual Discomfort of Humanity"
- "The Use of Ideals"
- "The Art of Being Photographed"
- "Bagshot's Mural Decorations"
- "On Social Music"
- "The Joys of Being Engaged"
- "La Belle Dame Sans Merci"
- "On a Tricycle"
- "An Unsuspected Masterpiece"
- "The Great Change"
- "The Pains of Marriage"
- "A Misunderstood Artist" (Pall Mall Gazette, 29 October 1894)
- "The Man With a Nose" (Pall Mall Gazette, 6 February 1894)

== Publication ==
Select Conversations with an Uncle was published in a limited edition by John Lane in a series called "The Mayfair Set" and in New York by Merriam. The volume was dedicated to "To my dearest and best friend, R.A.C.," which is a misprint either for R.A. Gregory, Wells's friend who later became the editor of Nature between 1919 and 1939, or for Wells's wife, Amy Catherine Robbins (better known as "Jane"); it was published the day before The Time Machine. The pieces in the book were drawn from thirty or more articles by Wells published in the Pall Mall Gazette beginning in 1893.

== Reception ==
Wells's "uncle" character had been "very well received" in the Pall Mall Gazette, but not all reviews of the volume were favorable. The Athenaeum panned it as "a dreary and foolish assemblage of commonplace ideas expressed in stilted phraseology."
