= The History of Mr Polly =

1910 comic novel by H. G. Wells

The History of Mr. Polly
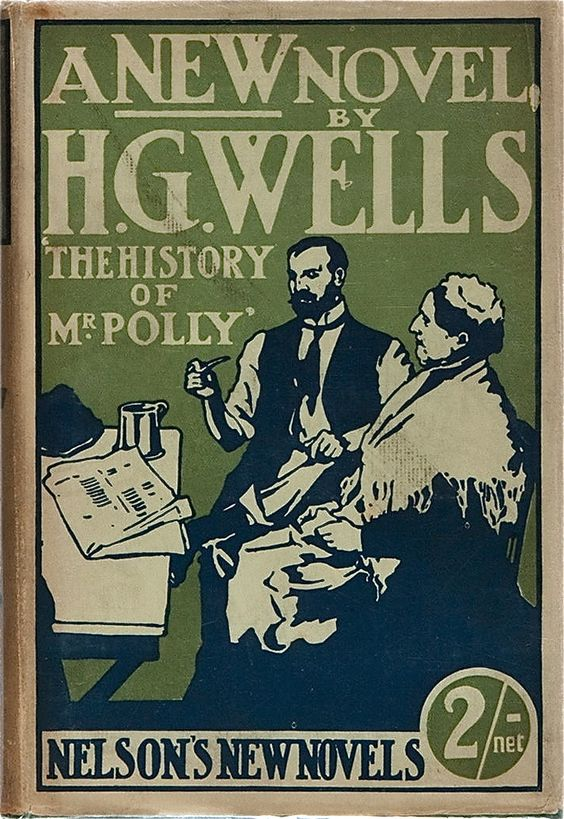
- first edition cover
- Author: H. G. Wells
- Language: English
- Genre: Comedy novel
- Publisher: Thomas Nelson and Sons
- Publication date: 1910
- Publication place: United Kingdom
- Pages: 318
- Text: The History of Mr. Polly at Wikisource

The History of Mr. Polly is a 1910 comic novel by H. G. Wells.

== Synopsis ==
The protagonist of The History of Mr. Polly is an antihero inspired by H. G. Wells's early experiences in the drapery trade: Alfred Polly, born circa 1870, is a timid and directionless young man living in Edwardian England. Despite his own bumbling, he achieves contented serenity with little help from those around him. Mr. Polly's most striking characteristic is his "innate sense of epithet", which leads him to coin hilarious expressions like "the Shoveacious Cult" for "sunny young men of an abounding and elbowing energy" and "dejected angelosity" for the ornaments of Canterbury Cathedral.

Alfred Polly resides in the imaginary town of Fishbourne in Kent. (Note: Not to be confused with Fishbourne, West Sussex or Fishbourne, Isle of Wight, the town in the story is thought to be based on Sandgate, Kent where Wells lived for several years.) The novel begins in medias res by presenting a miserable Mr. Polly: "He hated Foxbourne, (Note: Both the UK and the US first editions erroneously call the village "Foxbourne" in this passage, even though it is "Fishbourne" elsewhere, and in subsequent reprints.) he hated Foxbourne High Street, he hated his shop and his wife and his neighbours – every blessed neighbour – and with indescribable bitterness he hated himself". Thereafter, The History of Mr. Polly is divided in three parts. Chapters 1–6 depict his life up to age 20, when he marries his cousin Miriam Larkins and sets up an outfitter's shop in Fishbourne. Chapters 7–8 show Mr. Polly's spectacular suicide attempt, which ironically makes him a local hero, wins him insurance money that saves him from bankruptcy, and yields the insight that "Fishbourne wasn't the world", which leads him to abandon his shop and his wife. Chapters 9–10, at the Potwell Inn (apparently located in West Sussex), culminates in Mr. Polly's courageous victory over "Uncle Jim", a malicious relative of the innkeeper's granddaughter. An epilogue then depicts Mr. Polly at ease as assistant-innkeeper, after a brief visit to ascertain Miriam's prosperity.

== Themes ==
The novel's principal conflict is Mr. Polly's struggle with life, told "in the full-blooded Dickens tradition". (Note: Brome believed that The History of Mr. Polly was "guaranteed at least longevity at least by reason of the special alchemy which finds universality in everyday events, great comic scenes and natural unrestrained life") This moral struggle is slow to develop, for Mr. Polly is a stunted, rather than a gifted or self-confident character. He is not without imagination and a flair for language, but his mind is "at once too vivid in its impressions and too easily fatigued". His mother dies when he is seven, and his formal education ends at the age of fourteen, by which "Mr. Polly had lost much of his natural confidence, so far as figures and sciences and languages and the possibilities of learning things were concerned". His unsympathetic father apprentices him to The Port Burdock Drapery Bazaar. Unsatisfied there, he leaves to look for work in London, and is employed for a time in Canterbury, whose cathedral pleases him greatly: "There was a blood affinity between Mr. Polly and the Gothic".

Mr. Polly's struggles are chiefly moral: he has no confidence in his intellectual powers (though he is an avid reader), and his emotions are confused and timid. The reader is invited to see things from Mr. Polly's point of view, even when this leads him to commit arson and, perhaps, manslaughter. "This is a history and not a glorification of Mr. Polly, and I tell of things as they were with him." H. G. Wells's moral point of view in the novel is complex and often ironic, as Mr. Polly's musings at the end of the novel suggest: "One seems to start in life expecting something. And it doesn't happen. And it doesn't matter. One starts with ideas that things are good and things are bad – and it hasn't much relation to what is good and what is bad. . . . There's something that doesn't mind us. It isn't what we try to get that we get, it isn't the good we think we do is good. What makes us happy isn't our trying, what makes others happy isn't our trying. There's a sort of character people like and stand up for and a sort they won't. You got to work at it and take the consequences".

For the most part in The History of Mr. Polly the author's penchant for social reform is in abeyance; but Wells does cite twice the diagnosis of "a certain highbrowed, spectacled gentleman living at Highbury, wearing a gold pince-nez, and writing for the most part in the beautiful library of the Reform Club," who without knowing Mr. Polly diagnoses the situation of "those ill-adjusted units that abound in a society that has failed to develop a collective intelligence and a collective will for order, commensurate with its complexities." A later passage of several hundred words from the same unidentified author critiques "that vast mass of useless, uncomfortable, under-educated, under-trained and altogether pitiable people that we contemplate when we use that inaccurate and misleading term, the lower middle class."

== Criticism ==
The History of Mr. Polly received mostly enthusiastic reviews. H. L. Mencken published a glowing review in the July 1910 number of The Smart Set. The novel has been called "a complete comic miracle." Mr. Polly' has been called a "wonderful incarnation of what might have happened to Wells without education, a Wells driven to use the words bubbling in him and getting them all so delightfully muddled." (Note: According to Brome, Wells "drew his inspiration from a deep, inexhaustible sense of inferiority. He had been made to feel inferior, he had inherited many hurts, humiliations and snobberies and his very physical appearance put him on the defensive.") But Wells said his protagonist was based not on himself, but on his elder brother Frank.

The History of Mr. Polly was included by Robert McCrum in his list of the 100 best novels in English in The Guardian.

== Adaptations ==
A film version of the same name was made in 1949 by Anthony Pellisier, with John Mills as Polly. It was adapted by the BBC as a six-part television serial shown between 28 August – 2 October 1959, with Emrys Jones as Polly, and again as a five-part adaptation starring Andrew Sachs, shown between 2 and 30 March 1980. The 1959 version no longer exists. A feature-length version starring Lee Evans was shown on ITV in May 2007.

BBC Radio 4 broadcast a two-part dramatisation by Stephen Sheridan on 26 January and 2 February 2025. It starred Stephen Mangan as the Narrator and Paul Ready as Alfred Polly.
