= Ostrich egg =

Largest type of egg from any living bird

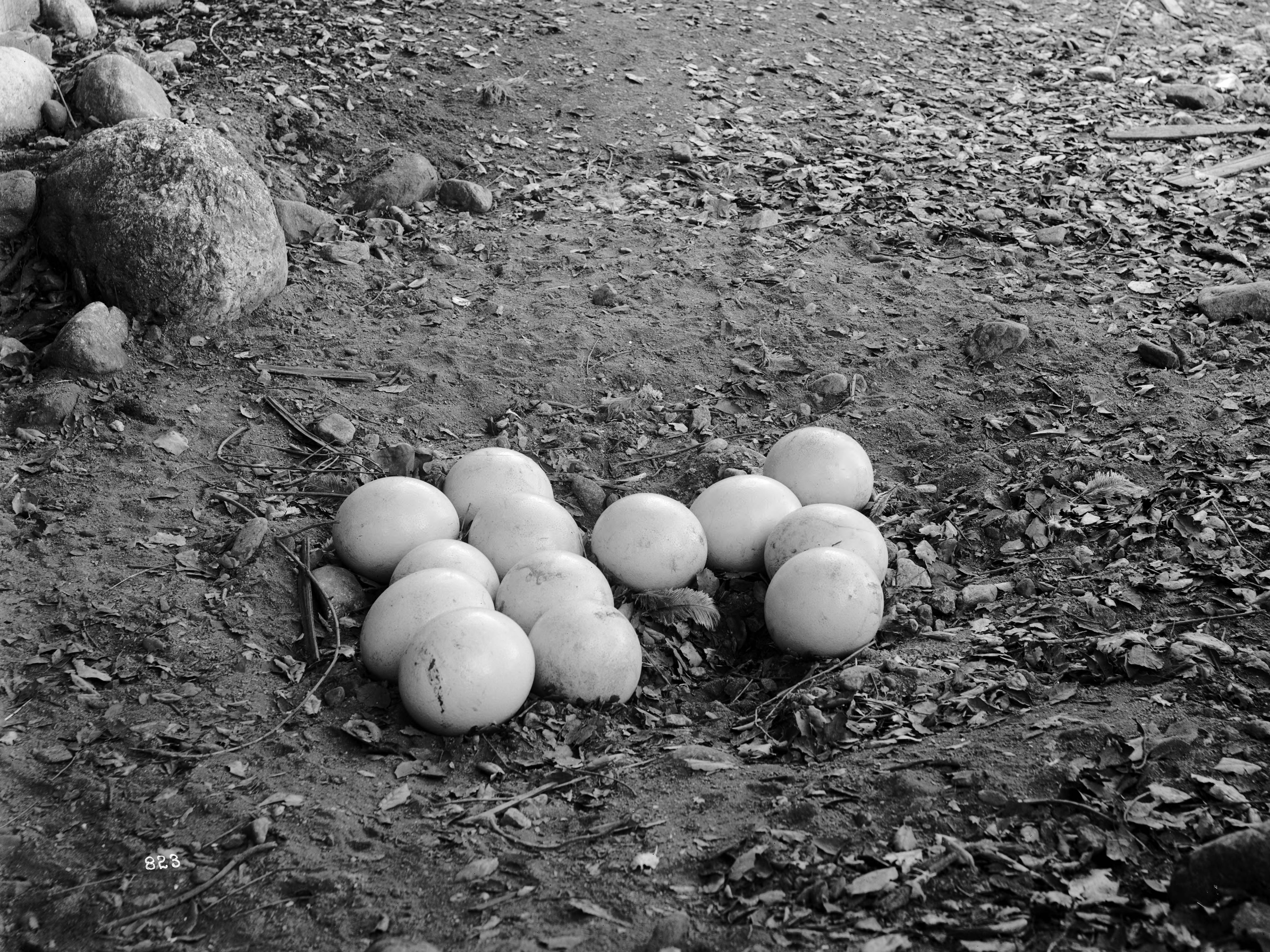
Ostrich eggs in a nest on a farm

The egg of the ostrich (genus Struthio) is the largest of any living bird (being exceeded in size by those of the extinct elephant bird genus Aepyornis and some moa such as the genus Dinornis). The shell has a long history of use by humans as a container and for decorative artwork, including beads. The eggs are edible but not commonly eaten.

== Biology ==
The female common ostrich lays her fertilized eggs in a single communal nest, a simple pit, 30 to 60 cm (12–24 in) deep and 3 m (9.8 ft) wide, scraped in the ground by the male. The dominant female lays her eggs first, and when it is time to cover them for incubation she discards extra eggs from the weaker females, leaving about 20 in most cases. A female common ostrich can distinguish her own eggs from the others in a communal nest. Ostrich eggs are the largest of all eggs, though they are actually the smallest eggs relative to the size of the adult bird — on average they are 15 cm (5.9 in) long, 13 cm (5.1 in) wide, and weigh 1.4 kilograms (3.1 lb), over 20 times the weight of a chicken's egg and only 1 to 4% the size of the female. They are glossy cream-colored, with thick shells marked by small pits.

The eggs are incubated by the females by day and by the males by night. This uses the coloration of the two sexes to escape detection of the nest, as the drab female blends in with the sand, while the black male is nearly undetectable in the night. The incubation period is 35 to 45 days, which is rather short compared to other ratites. This is believed to be the case due to the high rate of predation. Typically, the male defends the hatchlings and teaches them to feed, although males and females cooperate in rearing chicks. Fewer than 10% of nests survive the 9 week period of laying and incubation, and of the surviving chicks, only 15% of those survive to 1 year of age.

A possible origin for the myth that ostriches bury their heads in sand to avoid danger lies with the fact that ostriches keep their eggs in holes in the sand instead of nests, and must rotate them using their beaks during incubation; digging the hole, placing the eggs, and rotating them might each be mistaken for an attempt to bury their heads in the sand.

== Human uses ==
In Thebes, Egypt, the tomb of Haremhab, dating to approximately 1420 BC, shows a depiction of a man carrying bowls of ostrich eggs and other large eggs, presumably those of the pelican, as offerings.

Ostrich eggshells were used as containers in North Africa as early as the fourth millennium BC and in the Royal Cemetery at Ur from the third millennium. From the first millennium in the ancient Punic civilization, there are many examples of ostrich eggs decorated with painted geometric designs for use as cups and bowls. These have been found in Carthage, Sardinia, Sicily, the Iberian Peninsula and Ibiza. The tradition of using ostrich eggs as containers (sometimes decorated) continues to the present among the San people.

In the Middle Ages, ostrich eggs from Ethiopia were exported through the port of Bāḍiʿ on the Red Sea. During the Renaissance in Europe (15th–16th centuries AD), ostrich eggs were mounted in silver as goblets for display in cabinets of curiosities. Decorated eggs continue to be widely displayed in Eastern Orthodox churches, although their symbolism is disputed. They may symbolize the Virgin Birth, since according to Job 39:13–17 the ostrich lays its eggs in the sand and forgets, so they are hatched by the sun alone. This significance may lie behind the egg suspended above the Virgin Mary in Piero della Francesca's Brera Madonna painting.

In 2020, studies of decorated ostrich eggs in the British Museum showed that the methods by which they had been sourced, produced and traded were more complicated than had previously been imagined. Isotope analysis showed that eggs from the same archaeological site had originated in different places. The studies suggested that, rather than the eggs having been laid by captive birds, almost all had most likely been collected in the wild; a potentially hazardous undertaking.

Today, ostrich eggs are occasionally eaten as a culinary novelty. A single egg weighs 500–600 g (18–21 oz) and can serve about six people in dishes such as omelettes or pâtisserie, though the shell is very hard to crack and the pronounced flavour is typically tempered with milder ingredients like fresh herbs or cheese.

== Gallery ==
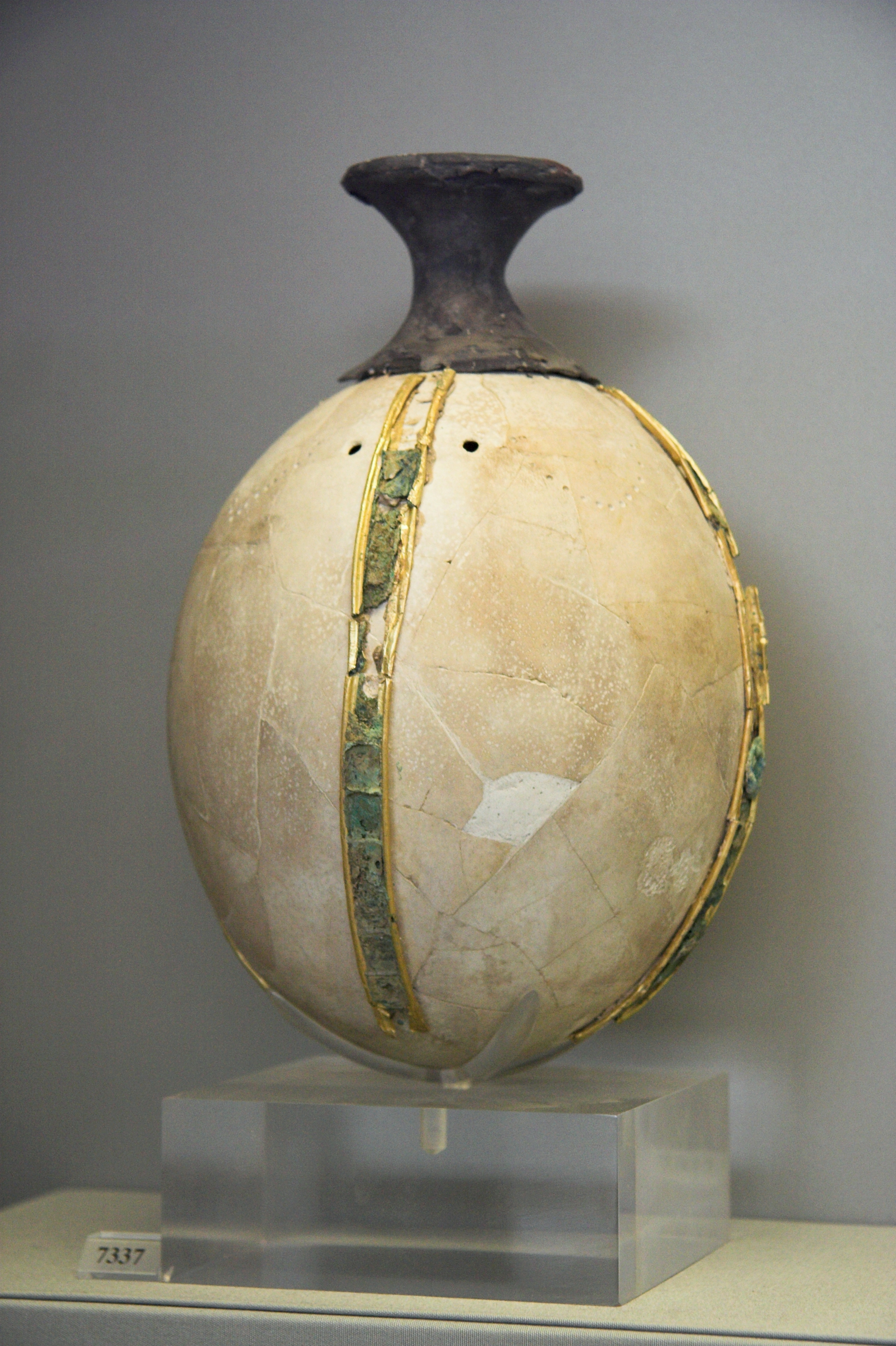
Mycenaean ostrich egg drinking vessel

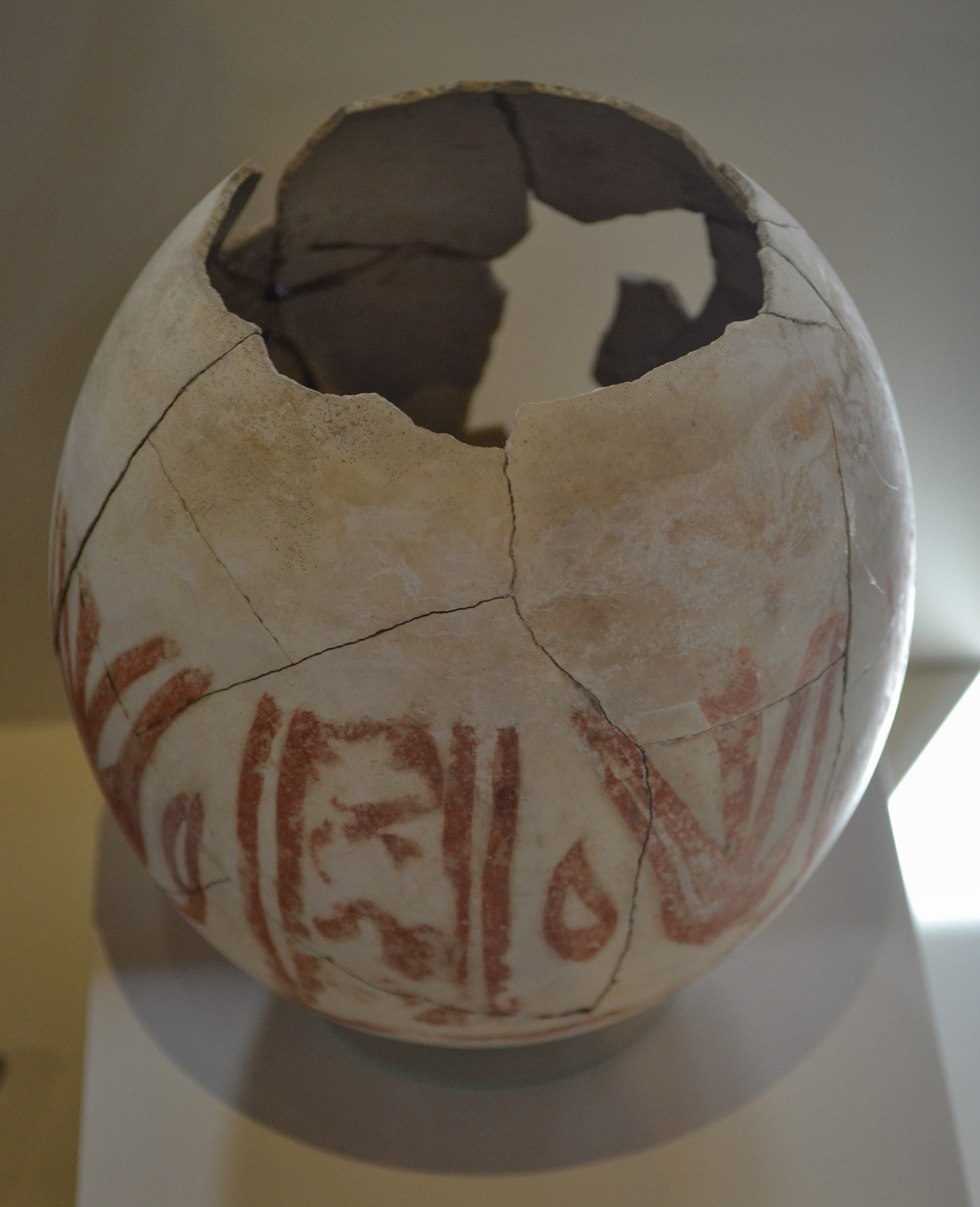
Decorated Punic egg

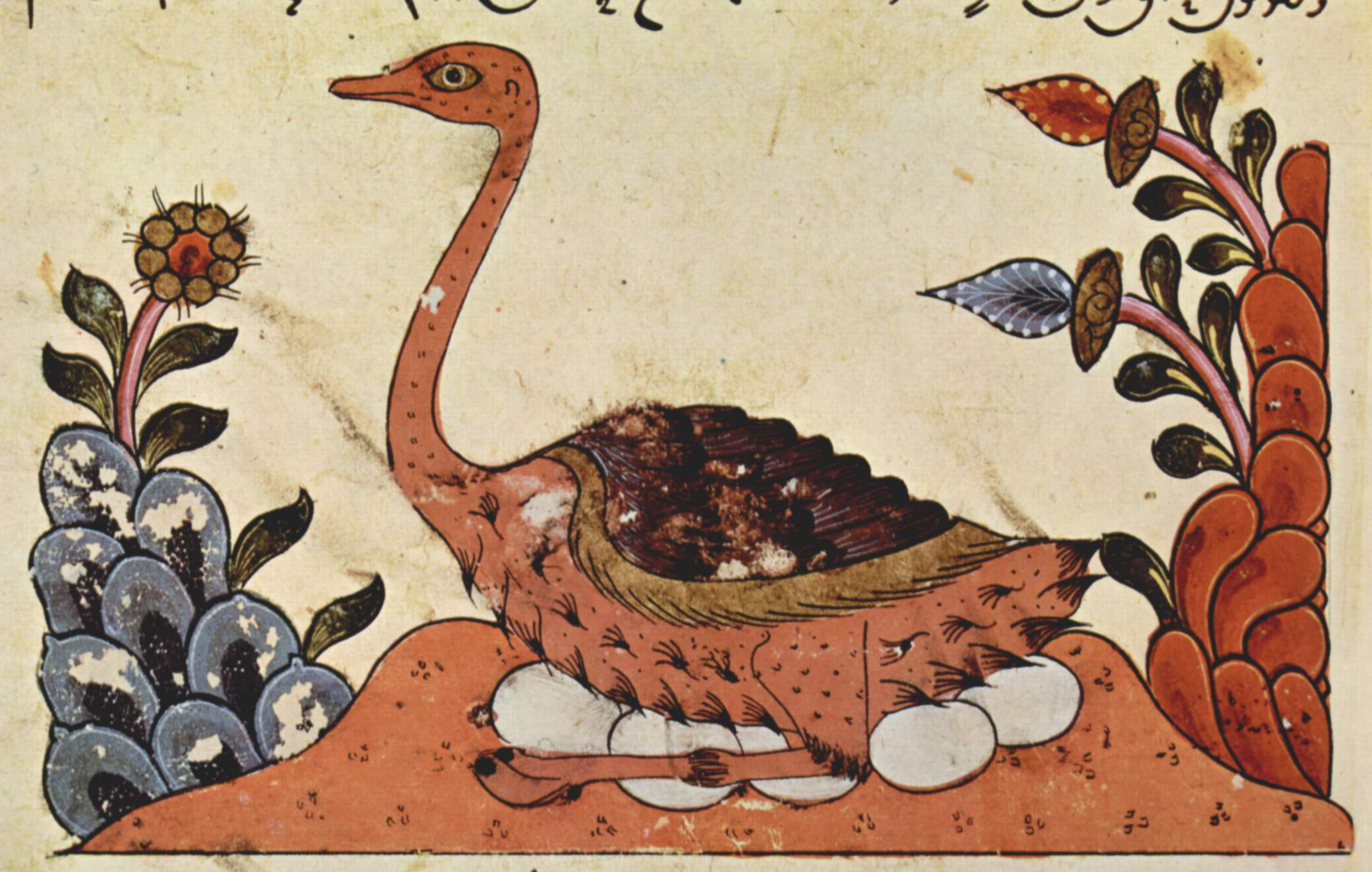
Ostrich sitting on eggs, from the Book of Animals of al-Jahiz

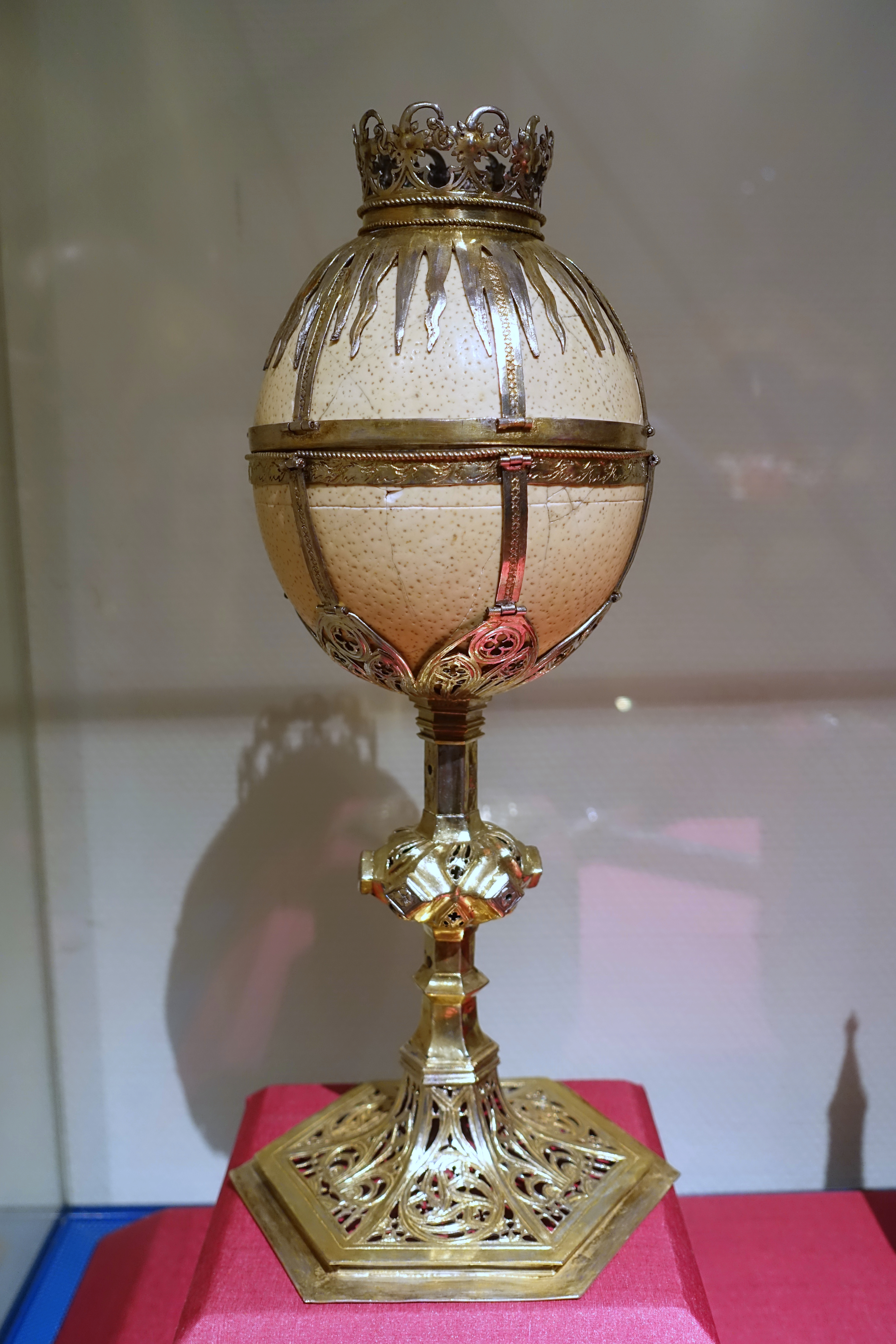
15th-century reliquary

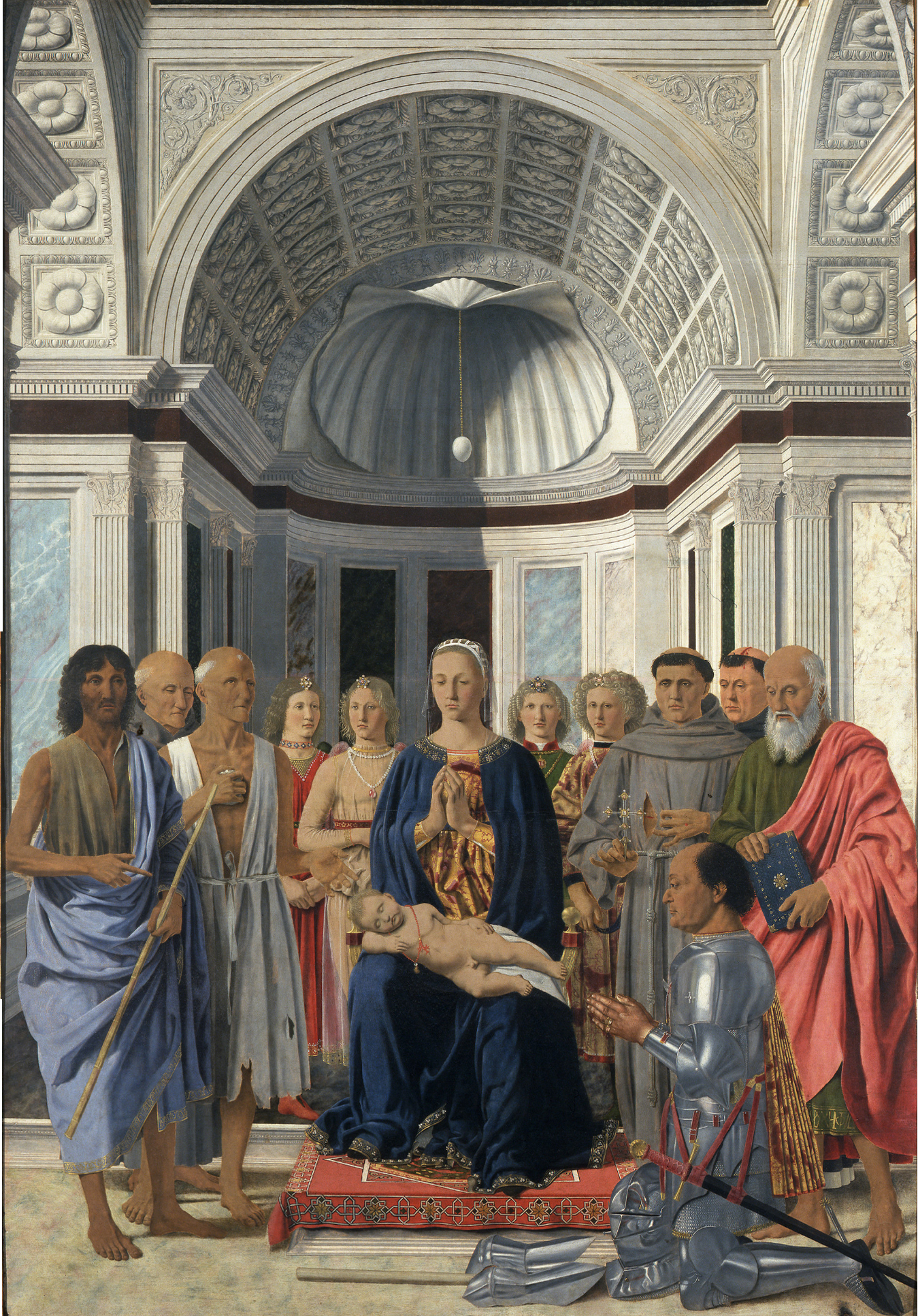
Brera Madonna by Piero della Francesca (c. 1472)

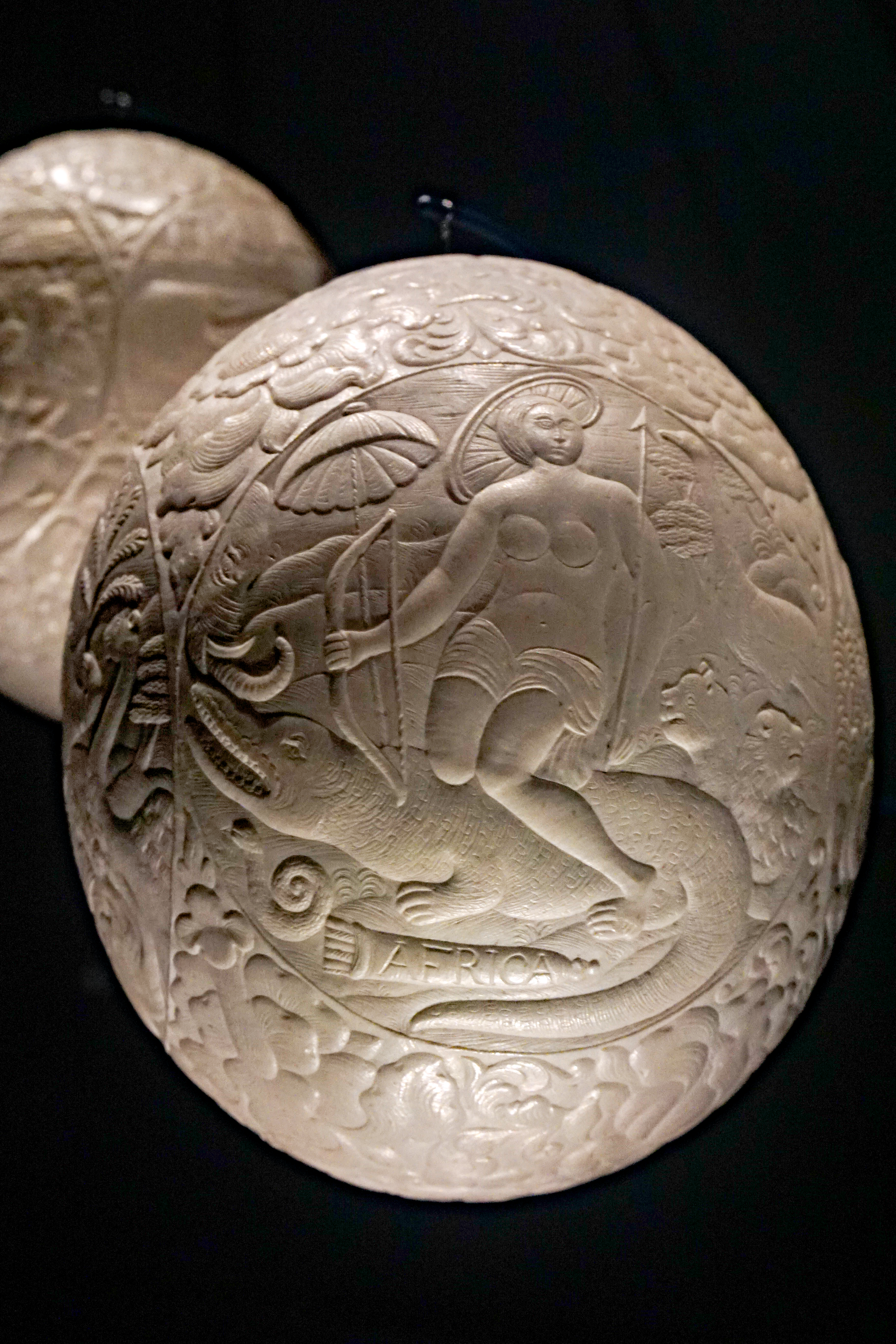
Carved ostrich egg (17th century)

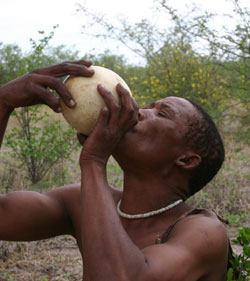
A San man drinking from an ostrich egg

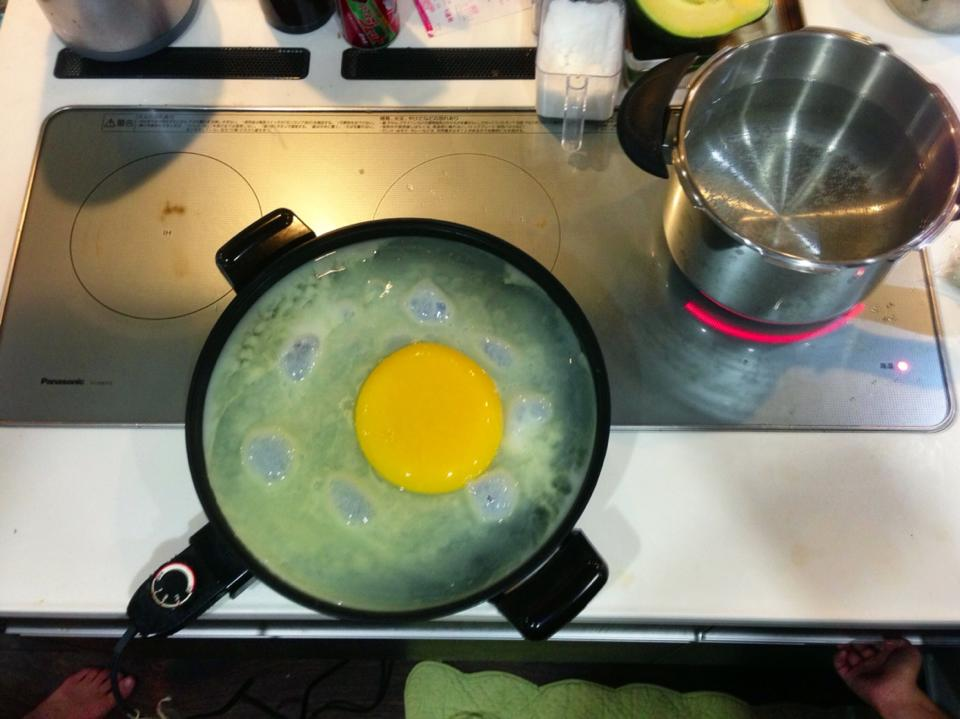
In a frying pan

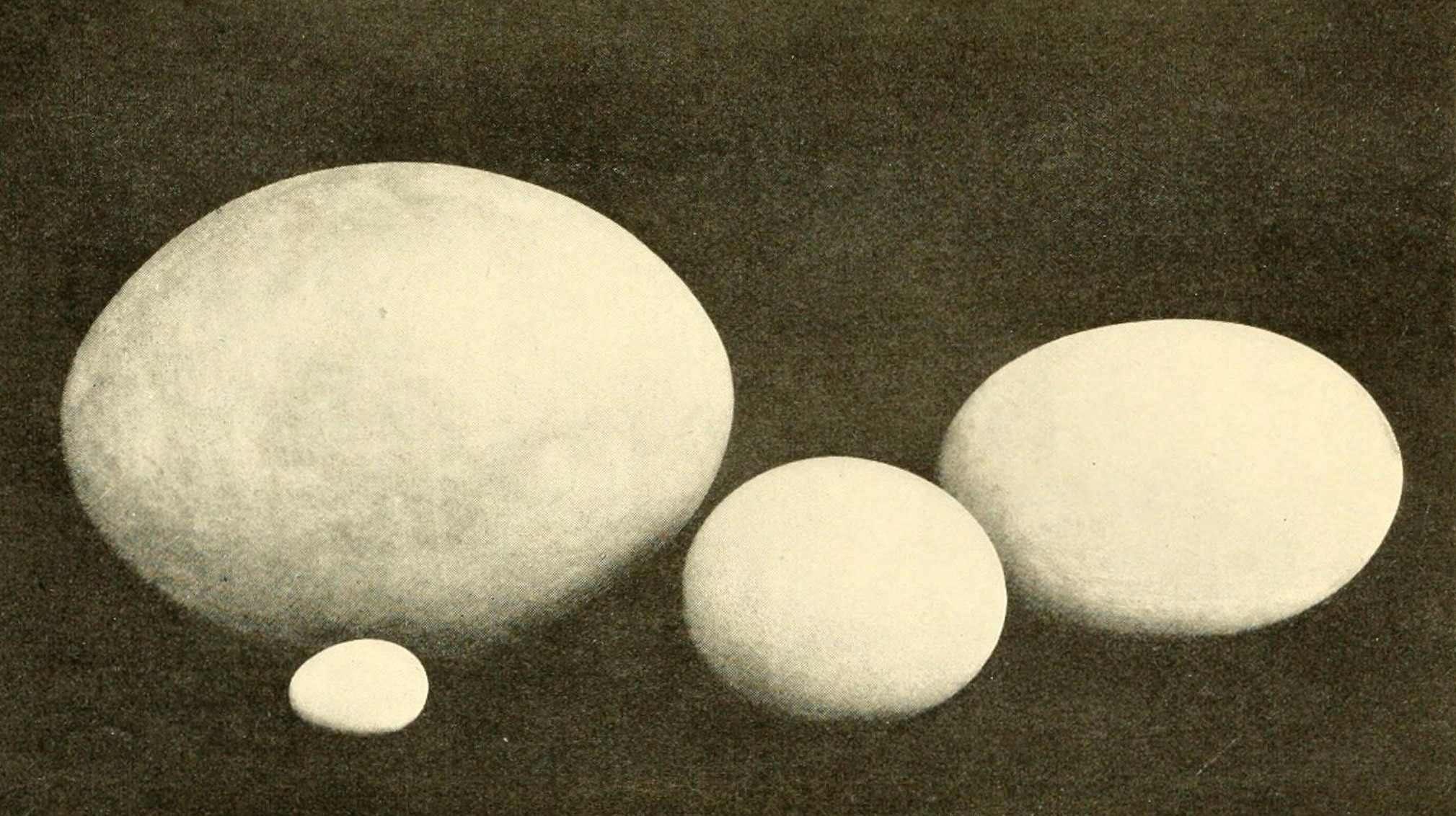
Comparison of an ostrich egg (centre) with that of the elephant bird Aepyornis (top left), a chicken (bottom left) and a moa (right)

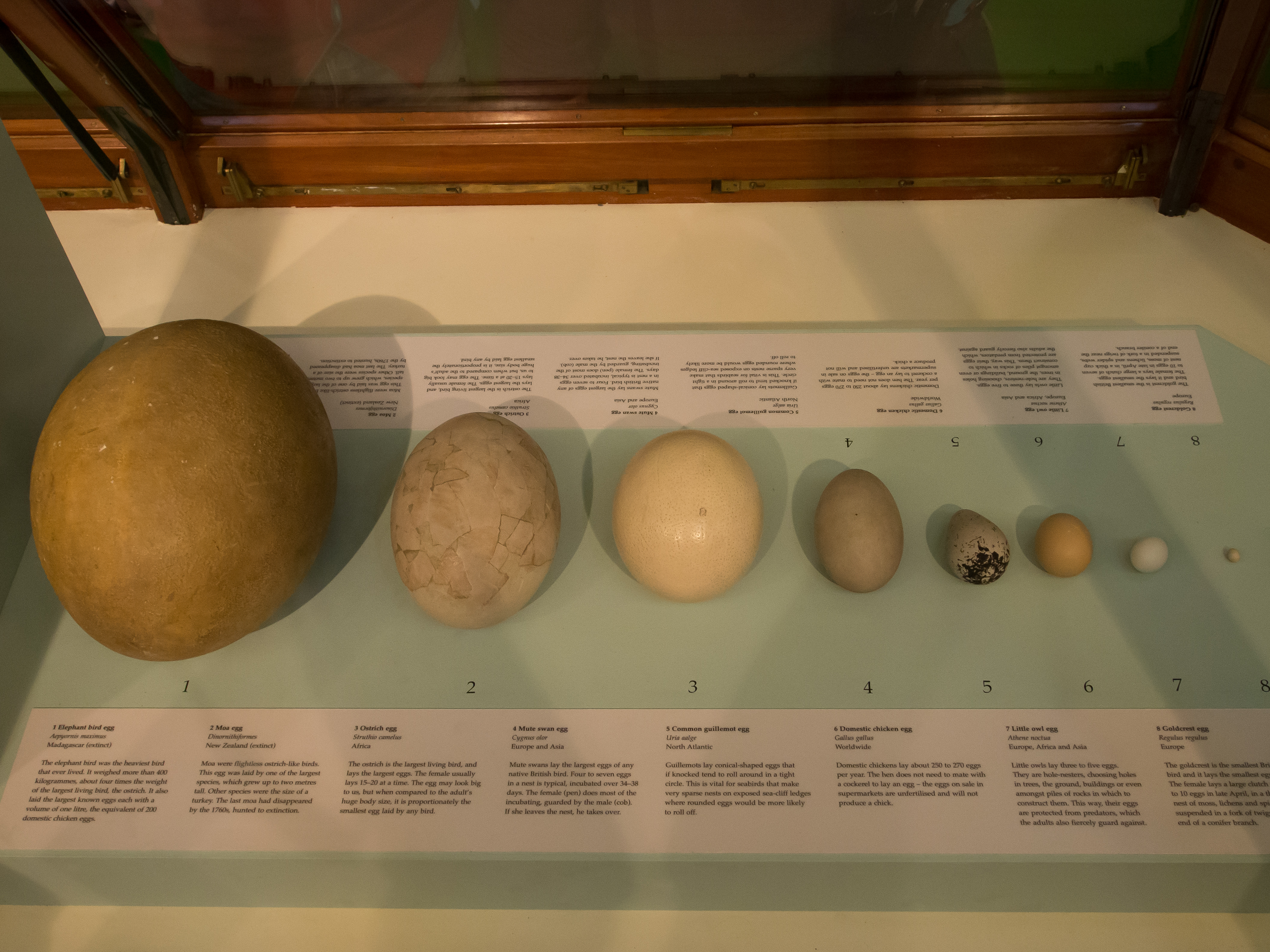
Size of ostrich egg (labeled 3, centre) compared to those of the elephant bird Aepyornis (1, far left), moa (2), mute swan (4), common murre (5), chicken (6), little owl (7) and goldcrest (8, far right)
