= Erythrina hazomboay =

Conservation status
- Endangered (IUCN 3.1)

Scientific classification
- Kingdom: Plantae
- Clade: Tracheophytes
- Clade: Angiosperms
- Clade: Eudicots
- Clade: Rosids
- Order: Fabales
- Family: Fabaceae
- Subfamily: Faboideae
- Genus: Erythrina
- Species: E. hazomboay

Binomial name
- Erythrina hazomboay Du Puy & Labat

Species of legume

Erythrina hazomboay is a species of legume in the family Fabaceae. It is found only in Madagascar. It grows as a shrub. It has a dehiscent fruit that when mature reveal black and red seeds, approximately 1.2 centimetres (0.47 in) in diameter. It has been suggested that these seeds may have been adapted to be ingested by the now extinct elephant birds, as their morphology mimics that of fleshy fruit.
