= The Lord of the Dynamos =

Short story by H. G. Wells

- Short story by H. G. Wells
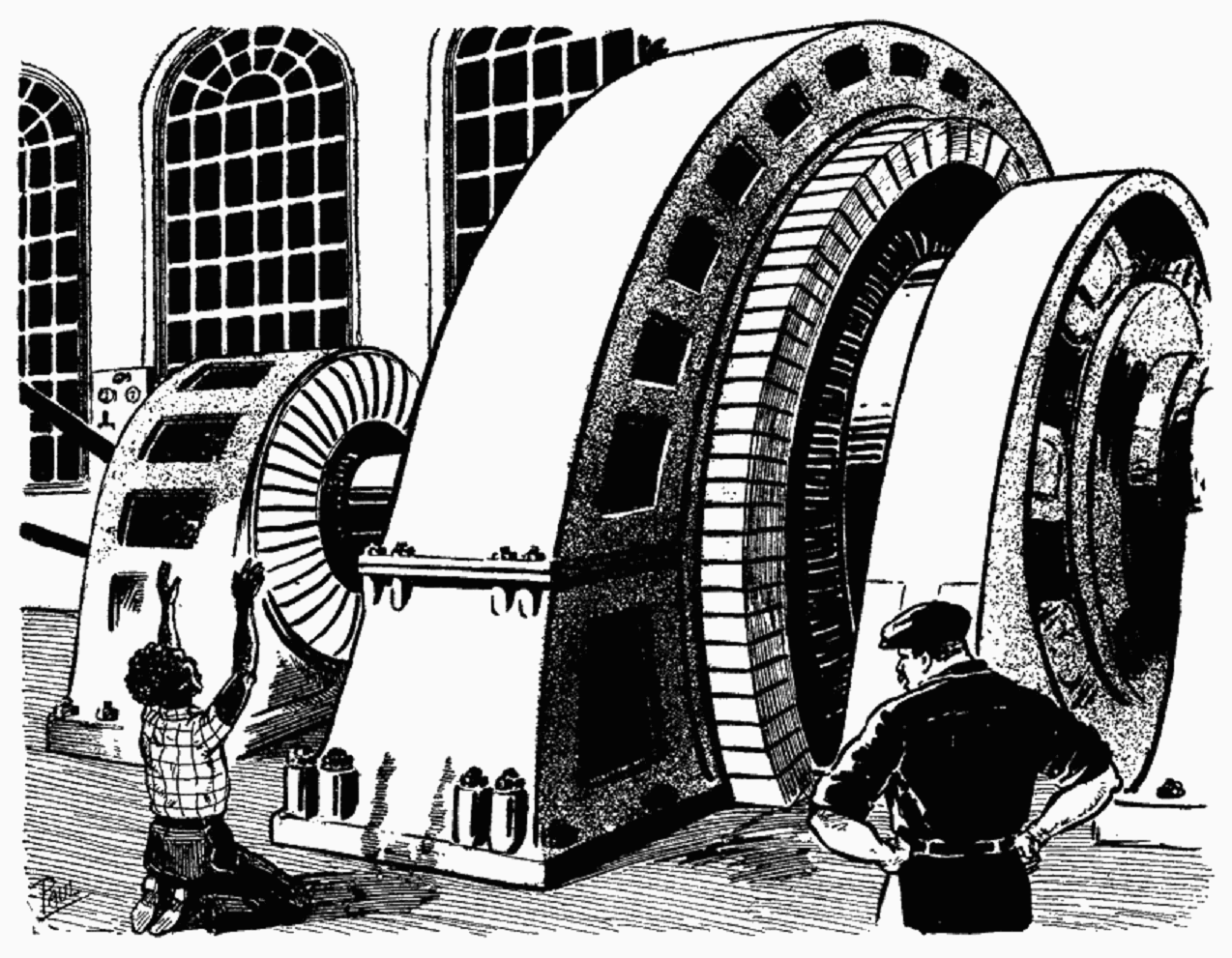
- Opening illustration for the story in Amazing Stories magazine, 1929.
- Country: United Kingdom
- Genres: Techno-thriller; Science fiction

Publication

"The Lord of the Dynamos" is a short story by English author H. G. Wells (1866–1946). It was originally published in the Pall Mall Budget (6 September 1894), and then included in the collection The Stolen Bacillus and Other Incidents, published by Methuen & Co. in 1895, and subsequently in his Complete Short Stories. It deals with what Wells describes as "certain odd possibilities of the negro mind brought into abrupt contact with the crown of our civilisation".

== Plot summary ==
Azuma-zi, a character of South-East Asian origin, arrives in London from the Straits Settlements on board a steamer where he was a stoker. He speaks no English and is bewildered by the turmoil of London; he loses all the money he has earned serving on the steamer and eventually finds work, again as a stoker, in a power station at Camberwell which supplies power to an underground electric railway (given the date of publication, this can only be the City and South London Railway, although the power station supplying this line was actually at Stockwell).

The power station is in the charge of one James Holroyd, an electrician from Yorkshire. He is a bully and a racist; he drinks whisky while on duty and beats Azuma-zi with a rod of copper wire. He is irreligious; he lectures Azuma-zi against religion, and suggests to him that the largest and most impressive of the three dynamos in the plant is more of a "Gord" than the one preached by missionaries.

Azuma-zi is powerfully impressed by the humming, whirling machinery and comes to believe that the big dynamo is indeed a god. He starts to worship it; he salaams to it when he arrives at work, prays to it to save him from Holroyd, cleans and polishes it with devotional care, and anoints it with oil – by which he unintentionally damages an area of the insulating varnish on the coils, and on discovering this Holroyd orders him to stay away from the machine with threats of violence.

Holroyd's bullying and Azuma-zi's dynamo worship combine to convince Azuma-zi that his god disapproves of Holroyd and eventually that it desires Holroyd as a human sacrifice. Azuma-zi surprises Holroyd, trips him and throws him against the exposed live terminals on the end of the dynamo, where he is electrocuted. Investigation of Holroyd's death is extremely perfunctory; the police are not called, Holroyd is presumed to have committed suicide, and nobody thinks to suspect Azuma-zi of murder.

Holroyd is replaced by a character named only as "the scientific manager"; in contrast to Holroyd's bullying, he takes very little notice of Azuma-zi at all. Nevertheless, impressed by the swift death inflicted on Holroyd by the dynamo, Azuma-zi decides to make the scientific manager a sacrifice as well. The scientific manager fights back, and manages to keep himself clear of the live parts until a third person happens to arrive on the scene, at which Azuma-zi panics, abandons the struggle and seizes the live terminals in his own hands.
