= The Stolen Bacillus and Other Incidents =

1895 collection of tales by H. G. Wells

- First British edition cover
- Author: H. G. Wells
- Language: English
- Genre: Short story, science fiction and fantasy
- Published: 1895
- Publisher: Methuen & Co.
- Publication place: United Kingdom
- Media type: Print (hardback)
- Pages: 275
- OCLC: 28923293
- Text: The Stolen Bacillus and Other Incidents at Wikisource

The Stolen Bacillus and Other Incidents is a collection of fifteen fantasy and science fiction short stories written by the English author H. G. Wells between 1893 and 1895. It was first published by Methuen & Co. in 1895 and was Wells's first book of short stories. All of the stories had first been published in various weekly and monthly periodicals.

== Contents ==
These are the short stories contained in this collection showing the periodicals in which they were first published.

- "The Stolen Bacillus" (Pall Mall Budget, 21 June 1894)
- "The Flowering of the Strange Orchid" (Pall Mall Budget, 2 August 1894)
- "In the Avu Observatory" (Pall Mall Budget, 9 August 1894)
- "The Triumphs of a Taxidermist" (Pall Mall Gazette, 3 March 1894)
- "A Deal in Ostriches" (Pall Mall Budget, 20 December 1894)
- "Through a Window" (Black and White, 25 August 1894)
- "The Temptation of Harringay" (The St. James’s Gazette, 9 February 1895)
- "The Flying Man" (Pall Mall Gazette, December 1893)
- "The Diamond Maker" (Pall Mall Budget, 16 August 1894)
- "Æpyornis Island" (Pall Mall Budget, 27 December 1894)
- "The Remarkable Case of Davidson’s Eyes" (Pall Mall Budget, 28 March 1895)
- "The Lord of the Dynamos" (Pall Mall Budget, 6 September 1894)
- "The Hammerpond Park Burglary" (Pall Mall Budget, 5 July 1894)
- "The Moth" (Pall Mall Gazette, 28 March 1895)
- "The Treasure in the Forest" (Pall Mall Budget, 23 August 1894)
