= The Diamond Maker =

- Short story by H. G. Wells
- Country: United Kingdom
- Genre: Science fiction

Publication
- Published in: Pall Mall Budget
- Media type: Print
- Publication date: 16 August 1894

"The Diamond Maker" is a short story by H. G. Wells, first published in 1894 in the Pall Mall Budget. It was included in The Stolen Bacillus and Other Incidents, the first collection of short stories by Wells, published in 1895.

In the story, a businessman hears an account from a man who has devoted years attempting to make synthetic diamonds, only to end as a desperate outcast.

== Historical background ==
It was known since experiments of Antoine Lavoisier that diamond was a form of carbon.

Wells's story appeared a few years after the claims of James Ballantyne Hannay in 1879 and Henri Moissan in 1893, that they had made artificial diamonds. Moissan heated charcoal (a form of carbon) and iron in a furnace until the iron melted, then rapidly cooled it, claiming that the iron would generate high pressure and transform some of the charcoal into (very small) diamonds. Others tried to repeat this experiment in later years, with only a few reporting that they could reproduce the result; commercially successful production of synthetic diamonds was not achieved until the 1950s.

== Story ==
The narrator is getting relief from his business life by gazing at the river from the Thames Embankment near Temple (Essex Street is mentioned, and there is a view of Waterloo Bridge and the towers of Westminster beyond). Here, someone who looks like a tramp starts a conversation with him. Despite his appearance he talks like an educated businessman. He has a bag of what appear to be uncut diamonds. One, which is as big as the tip of a thumb, he offers to sell for a hundred pounds, but the narrator is suspicious.

The man tells him that he has spent years on a project to make diamonds. It was done secretly, so that others would not copy his work, and so that he could sell his diamonds without it being known that they could be produced in large quantities. After his money ran out he conducted his experiments in cheap lodgings in Kentish Town, and had various menial jobs. He finally succeeded when, using an idea suggested by experiments of Gabriel Auguste Daubrée, he put the mixture which might produce diamonds together with dynamite in a cylinder too strong to burst. However, as he inspected the results, a neighbour in the lodgings house, thinking he was a bomb-making anarchist, told him he had called the police. He abandoned the lodgings house, taking with him his diamonds; this left him in the state in which the narrator has found him: homeless and carrying diamonds which he cannot try to sell without causing suspicion.

The narrator thinks the man's story might be genuine, and gives him his business card, but although he has some communication with him for a period, he does not see the man again. Reflecting later on the encounter, he wonders if the man is dead, or will perhaps re-emerge and become famous; he wonders if he missed a business opportunity.

== See also ==
- The Doings of Raffles Haw, an 1891 novel by Sir Arthur Conan Doyle involving an inventor of a process for turning lead into gold
