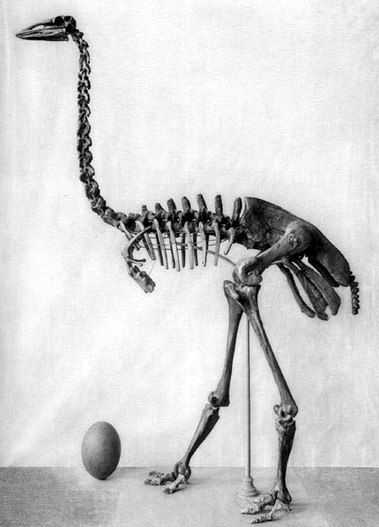
- Aepyornis maximus skeleton and egg

Scientific classification
- Kingdom: Animalia
- Phylum: Chordata
- Class: Aves
- Infraclass: Palaeognathae
- Clade: Notopalaeognathae
- Order: †Aepyornithiformes (Newton, 1884)

Type species
- †Aepyornis maximus Hilaire, 1851

Genera
- †Aepyornis; †Mullerornis

= Elephant bird =

Elephant birds Temporal range: Quaternary

Extinct order of birds

Elephant birds are extinct flightless birds belonging to the order Aepyornithiformes that were native to the island of Madagascar. They are thought to have gone extinct around 1000 AD, likely as a result of human activity. There are three currently recognised species, one in the genus Mullerornis, and two in Aepyornis. Aepyornis maximus is possibly the largest bird to have ever lived, with their eggs being the largest known for any amniote. Elephant birds were herbivores and major components of Madagascar's pre-human ecosystems. Elephant birds are palaeognaths (whose flightless representatives are often known as ratites), and their closest living relatives are kiwi (found only in New Zealand), suggesting that ratites did not diversify by vicariance during the breakup of Gondwana but instead convergently evolved flightlessness from ancestors that dispersed more recently by flying.

== Discovery ==
Elephant birds have been extinct since at least the 17th century. Étienne de Flacourt, a French governor of Madagascar during the 1640s and 1650s, mentioned the Vouron patra, an ostrich-like bird. This has generally been taken as a reference to elephant birds, although it has been argued that he may have been repeating folk tales from generations earlier. In his 1658 work, Histoire de la grande isle Madagascar, Flacourt wrote of the bird (in translation):

Vouron patra, it is a large bird that lives in the Ampatres [an old name for the Androy region in southern Madagascar], & makes eggs like the Ostrich, it is a kind of Ostrich, the inhabitants of those parts cannot catch it, it seeks the most deserted places.

There has been speculation, especially popular in the latter half of the 19th century, that the legendary roc from the accounts of Marco Polo was ultimately based on elephant birds, but this is disputed.

Between 1830 and 1840, European travelers in Madagascar saw giant eggs and eggshells. British observers were more willing to believe the accounts of giant birds and eggs because they knew of the moa in New Zealand. In 1851 the genus Aepyornis and species A. maximus were scientifically described in a paper presented to the Paris Academy of Sciences by Isidore Geoffroy Saint-Hilaire, based on bones and eggs recently obtained from the island, which resulted in wide coverage in the popular presses of the time, particularly due to their very large eggs. The name "elephant bird" was in use in English to refer to Aepyornis by 1890. The genus Mullerornis was described in 1894 by Alphonse Milne-Edwards & Alfred Grandidier.

Two whole eggs have been found in dune deposits in southern Western Australia, one in the 1930s (the Scott River egg) and one in 1992 (the Cervantes egg); both have been identified as Aepyornis maximus rather than Genyornis newtoni, an extinct giant bird known from the Pleistocene of Australia. It is hypothesized that the eggs floated from Madagascar to Australia on the Antarctic Circumpolar Current. Evidence supporting this is the finding of two fresh penguin eggs that washed ashore on Western Australia but may have originated in the Kerguelen Islands, and an ostrich egg found floating in the Timor Sea in the early 1990s.

== Taxonomy and evolution ==
Like the ostrich, rhea, cassowary, emu, kiwi and extinct moa, elephant birds are ratites and members of infraclass Palaeognathae; they could not fly, and their breast bones had no keel.

Sequencing of ancient DNA obtained from elephant bird remains including eggs, as well as genetic sequencing of other palaeognaths indicate that New Zealand kiwis are their closest known relatives, though the split between the two groups is deep, with kiwis and elephant birds being estimated to have diverged from each other around 54 million years ago, during the early Eocene epoch.

Placement of elephant birds within Palaeognathae, after Takezaki et al. 2023 and Kück and Suh 2026.

- Paleognathae
  - Struthionidae (ostriches)
  - Notopalaeognathae
    - Rheidae (rhea)
    - Dinocrypturi
      - Tinamidae (tinamou)
      - †Dinornithiformes (moa)
    - - Apterygidae (kiwis)
      - †Aepyornithiformes (elephant birds)
    - Casuariiformes
      - Casuarius (Cassowary)
      - Dromaius (Emu)

Historically, it was thought that the ancestor of ratites had been flightless and lived on Gondwana prior to its breakup, and that the various ratite lineages had diverged as a result of vicariance as Gondwana broke up during the Cretaceous. It is now thought, based on genetic evidence, such as the flighted tinamou being nested within the ratites, that ratites, including elephant birds, convergently evolved flightlessness many times considerably after Gondwana broke apart. Madagascar has a notoriously poor Cenozoic terrestrial fossil record, with essentially no fossils from the end of the Cretaceous around 66 million years ago until around 80,000 years ago, during the early Late Pleistocene, leaving the time of arrival and evolution of elephant birds on Madagascar almost entirely unknown. Complete mitochondrial genomes obtained from elephant birds eggshells suggest that Aepyornis and Mullerornis are significantly genetically divergent from each other, with molecular clock analyses estimating the split between the ancestors of Aepyornis and Mullerornis around 27-30 million years ago, during the Oligocene epoch.

Historically, some other extinct birds were included in Aepyornithiformes, such as the emu-sized presumably flightless bird Eremopezus and its synonym Stromeria from the Eocene of Egypt, but they are now considered unrelated. Eggshell fragments found on Lanzarote in the Canary Islands, dating to the early Pliocene, around 4 million years ago, have been suggested by some authors to represent those of close relatives of elephant birds based on their pore morphology, though it is now argued that they likely represent those of ostriches.

=== Systematic taxonomy and species ===
All elephant birds are usually placed in the single family Aepyornithidae Bonaparte, 1853, but some authors suggest Aepyornis and Mullerornis should be placed in separate families within the Aepyornithiformes, with the latter placed into Mullerornithidae Lamberton, 1934. The authority of the order Aepyornithiformes is generally given as Newton 1884, after Alfred Newton's usage of Aepyornithes (originally spelled Æpyornithes) in the "Ornithology" article in the 9th edition of the Encyclopædia Britannica. However, Newton had already used Aepyornithes in an 1877 article in The Annals and Magazine of Natural History. The first use of Aepyornithiformes was by Max Fürbringer in 1888.

At least 11 species in the genus Aepyornis have been named, but the validity of many have been disputed, with numerous authors treating them all in just one species, A. maximus. Up to three species have been described in Mullerornis. A major systematic review by Hansford and Turvey (2018) based on morphological analysis recognised only four valid elephant bird species, Aepyornis maximus, Aepyornis hildebrandti, Mullerornis modestus, and the new species and genus Vorombe titan to accommodate the largest elephant bird remains. However, the validity of Vorombe titan was later questioned by genetic sequencing data, which did not find evidence for a third genus of elephant bird in sampled eggshell DNA sequences, and skeletal remains assigned to Vorombe were found within the genetic group containing Aepyornis maximus skeletal remains and eggshells (including those of the largest elephant bird eggs), and it has thus been proposed that specimens assigned to Vorombe actually represent large specimens of A. maximus, perhaps sexually dimorphic larger females, as is observed in the giant moa genus Dinornis. Eggshells that have had their DNA sequenced from the far north of Madagascar may represent a third species of Aepyornis, due to their genetic distinctiveness from the other two species, but the lack of skeletal remains from this region renders this currently inconclusive, and may instead represent a genetically distinctive subpopulation of A. hildebrandti.

- Order Aepyornithiformes authority traditionally given as (Newton 1884)
  - Genus Aepyornis Geoffroy Saint-Hilaire 1850 (Synonym: Vorombe Hansford & Turvey 2018)
    - Aepyornis hildebrandti Burckhardt, 1893
    - Aepyornis maximus Hilaire, 1851
  - Genus Mullerornis Milne-Edwards & Grandidier 1894
    - Mullerornis modestus (Milne-Edwards & Grandidier 1869) Hansford & Turvey 2018

== Description ==
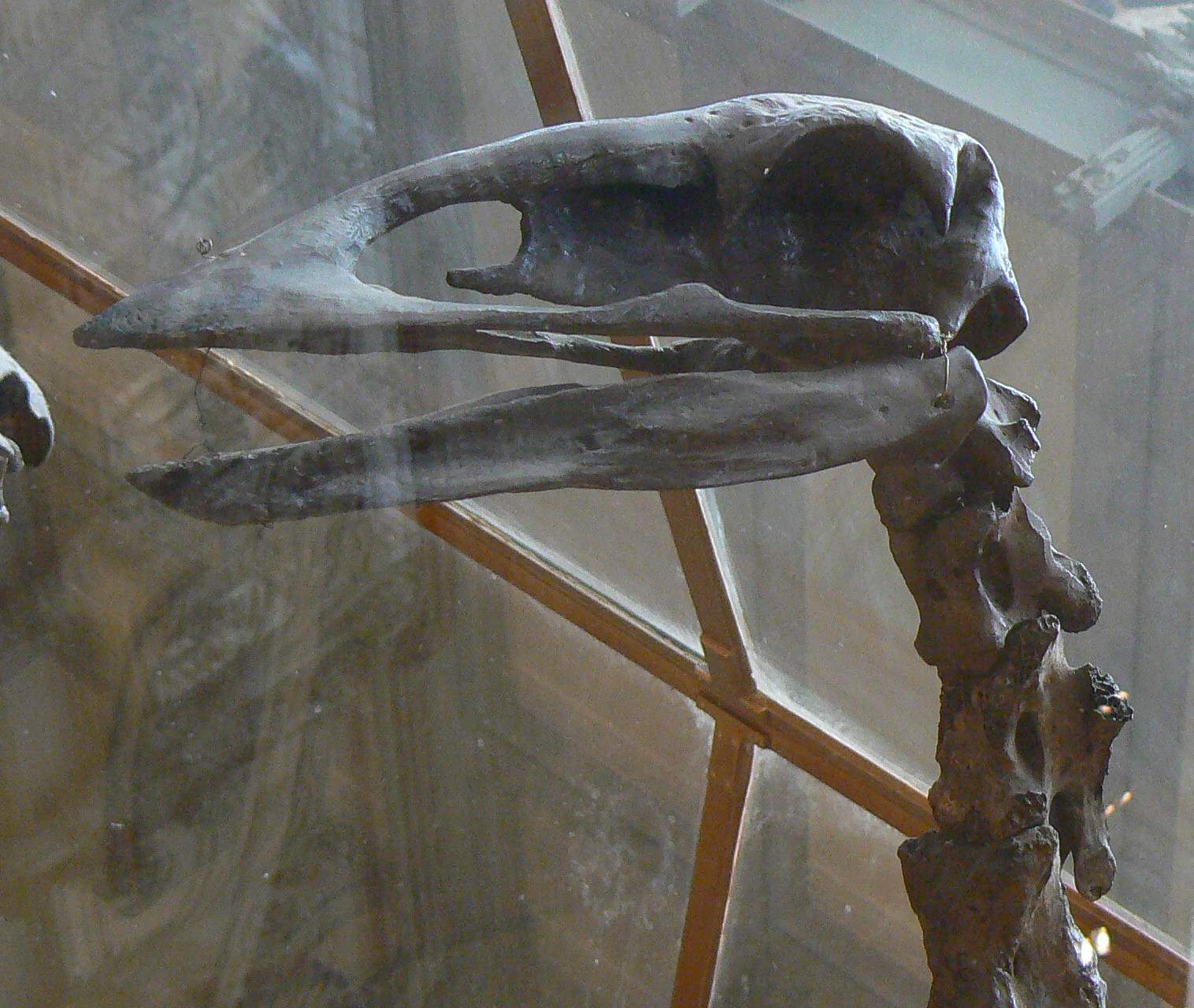
Aepyornis skull

Elephant birds were large birds, the largest reaching 3 metres (9.8 ft) tall in upright standing posture. Like most other ratites, they had long legs and elongate necks, with small heads relative to body size. Their skulls bore straight, thick conical beaks that were not hooked. The skulls of elephant bird species differ little from each other except in size, though the front part of the skull in Mulleronis is less robustly built than in Aepyornis. The tops of elephant bird skulls display punctuated marks, which may have been attachment sites for fleshy structures or head feathers. The wings were vestigial. The spinal column is suggested to have been made up of 24 free unfused vertebrae, 16-17 cervical vertebrae in the neck, and 6-7 thoracic vertebrae. The pelvis of Aepyornis is robust and all its constituent elements (pubis, ilium and vertebrae) heavily fused to each other. The pelvis of Mulleronis is generally three times wider than long. The hindlimb bones, especially the femur and tibiotarsus, are very robust (proportionally stocky/thick) in Aepyornis, with the femur of Aepyornis being distinctly short and wide. The hindlimb bones were somewhat more gracile in Mullerornis. The terminal claw-bearing phalanges in the feet are uncurved and relatively broad, though somewhat more elongate and sharper in shape in Mullerornis.

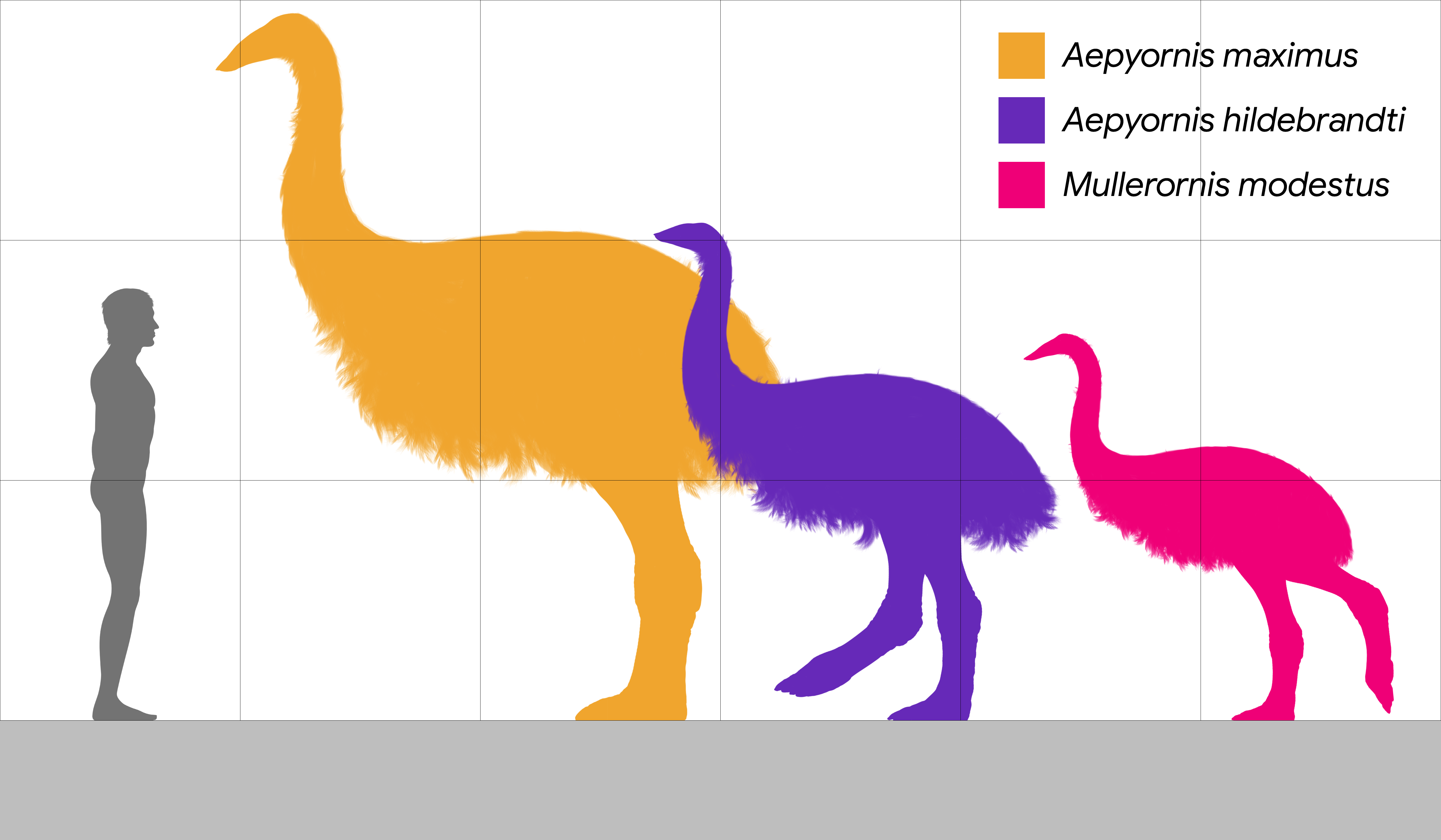
Size comparison of the three recognised elephant bird species compared to a human

Mullerornis is the smallest of the elephant birds, with a body mass of around 80 kilograms (180 lb), with its skeleton much less robustly built than Aepyornis. A. hildebrandti is thought to have had a body mass of around 230–285 kg (507–628 lb). Estimates of the body mass of Aepyornis maximus span from around 275 kg (606 lb) to 700–1,000 kg (1,500–2,200 lb) making it one of the largest birds ever, alongside Dromornis stirtoni and Pachystruthio dmanisensis. Females of A. maximus are suggested to have been larger than the males, as is observed in other ratites.

== Biology ==
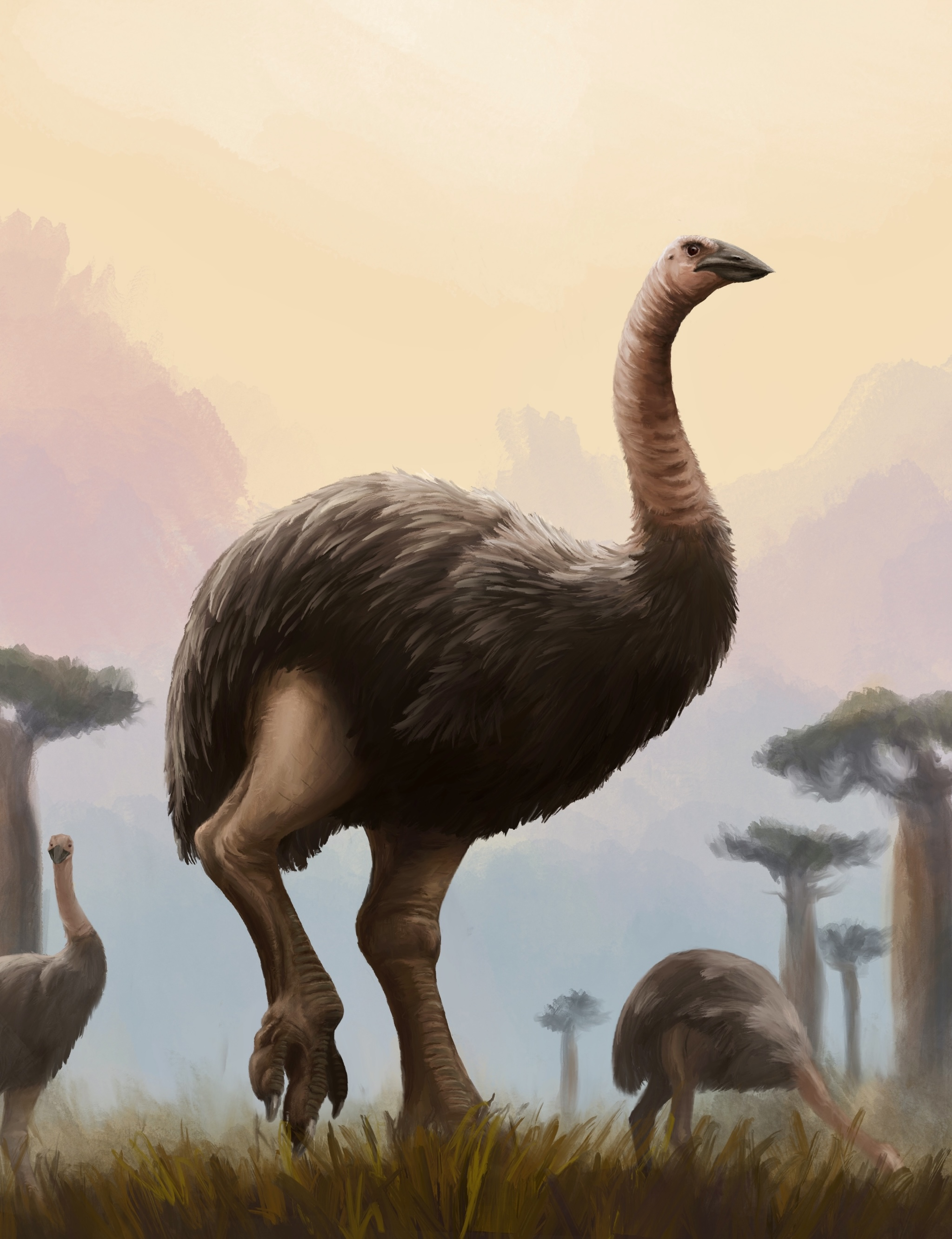
Aepyornis maximus restoration

Examination of brain endocasts has shown that both A. maximus and A. hildebrandti had greatly reduced optic lobes (a part of the brain that processes visual information), compared to most other ratites, similar to those of their closest living relatives, the kiwis, and consistent with a similar nocturnal lifestyle. The optic lobes of Mullerornis were also reduced, but to a lesser degree, suggestive of a nocturnal or crepuscular lifestyle. A. maximus had relatively larger olfactory bulbs than A. hildebrandti, suggesting that the former occupied forested habitats where the sense of smell is more useful while the latter occupied open habitats. Elephant birds probably heavily relied on their sense of smell. Morphological analysis of their ears suggests that they had relatively poor hearing. Based on the proportions of their leg bones, unlike most living ratites such as ostriches, emus and rheas, but similar to moas, elephant birds are thought to have walked with a relatively slow graviportal locomotion, though the smaller Mullerornis may have been capable of somewhat more agile locomotion than the larger Aepyornis species.

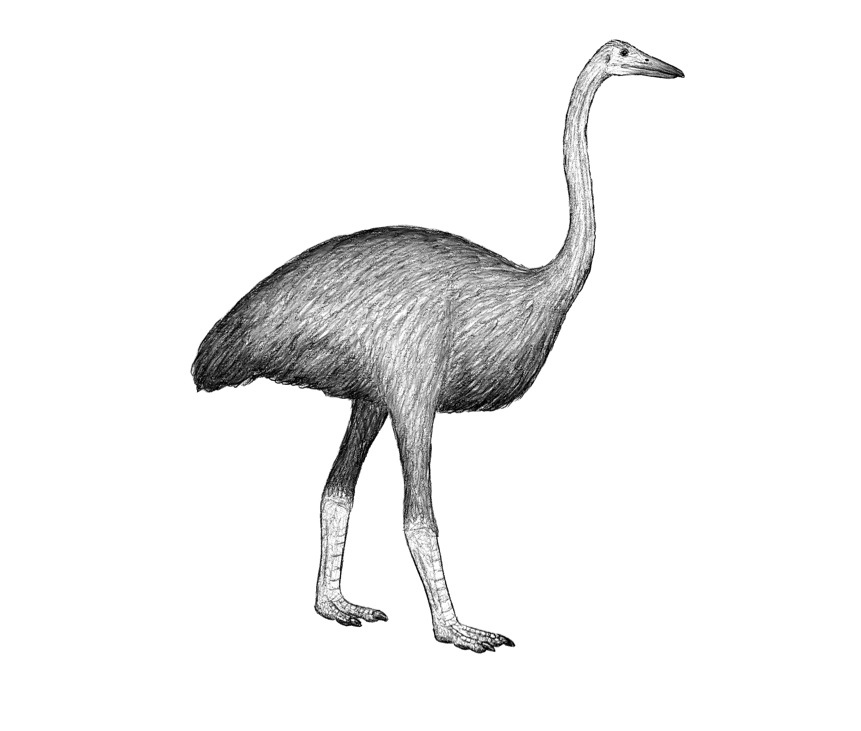
Mullerornis modestus

=== Diet ===
Elephant birds are inferred to have been herbivorous and a major component of Madagascar's pre-human herbivore guild. A 2022 isotope analysis study suggested that some specimens of Aepyornis hildebrandti were mixed feeders that had a large (~48%) grazing component to their diets, similar to that of the living Rhea americana and may have lived primarily in open habitats, while the other species (including A. maximus and Mullerornis modestus) were probably browsers in forested environments. It has been suggested that Aepyornis straightened its legs and brought its torso into an erect position in order to browse higher vegetation. Some Malagasy fleshy palm fruits with hard, thick, highly sculptured endocarps (the inner layer directly surrounding the seed), such as those of the highly threatened forest coconut palm (Voanioala gerardii), which lacks effective living seed dispersers, and Satranala decussilvae may have been adapted to be ingested by elephant birds and allow the seed to survive the journey through the crop and gastrointestinal tract, as palm fruits with similar features native to New Guinea are readily ingested by cassowaries, who serve as major seed dispersers to these palm species. Other plant species whose seeds are suggested to be adapted for dispersal by elephant birds include the legume Erythrina hazomboay (which has large colourful seeds that may have served to trick elephant birds into eating them by mimicking fleshy fruit) and possibly Tabernaemontana stellata. Species of the bur-producing genus Uncarina may have been adapted to dispersing via attaching to elephant bird feet. A considerable number of Malagasy thicket shrubs and juvenile trees have several shared traits, including wide (divaricate) branching, thin, elastic, difficult to break stems, relatively small leaves, and stems that move considerably when pulled, that have been suggested to have been adaptations to resist the inferred plucking style of elephant bird feeding (due to their hard beaks, birds are largely undeterred by spines, unlike soft-lipped mammals). Similar traits in New Zealand plants have been suggested to serve to resist moa herbivory.

=== Growth and reproduction ===
Elephant birds are thought to have had a k-selective life strategy, taking at least several years from hatching to reaching maximum body size, as opposed to taking around a year to reach maximum body size from hatching as is typical of birds. Elephant birds are suggested to have grown in periodic spurts rather than having continuous growth. An embryonic skeleton of Aepyornis is known from an intact egg, around 80–90% of the way through incubation before it died. This skeleton shows that even at this early ontogenetic stage that the skeleton was robust, much more so than comparable hatchling ostriches or rheas, which may suggest that hatchlings were precocial.

The eggs of Aepyornis are the largest known for any amniote, and have a volume of around 5.6–13 litres (12–27 US pt), a length of approximately 26–40 centimetres (10–16 in) and a width of 19–25 cm (7.5–9.8 in). The largest Aepyornis eggs are on average 3.3 mm (1/8 in) thick, with an estimated weight of approximately 10.5 kg (23 lb). Eggs of Mullerornis were much smaller, estimated to be only 1.1 mm (3/64 in) thick, with a weight of about 0.86 kg (1.9 lb). The large size of elephant bird eggs means that they would have required substantial amounts of calcium, which is usually taken from a reservoir in the medullary bone in the femurs of female birds. Possible remnants of this tissue have been described from the femurs of A. maximus.

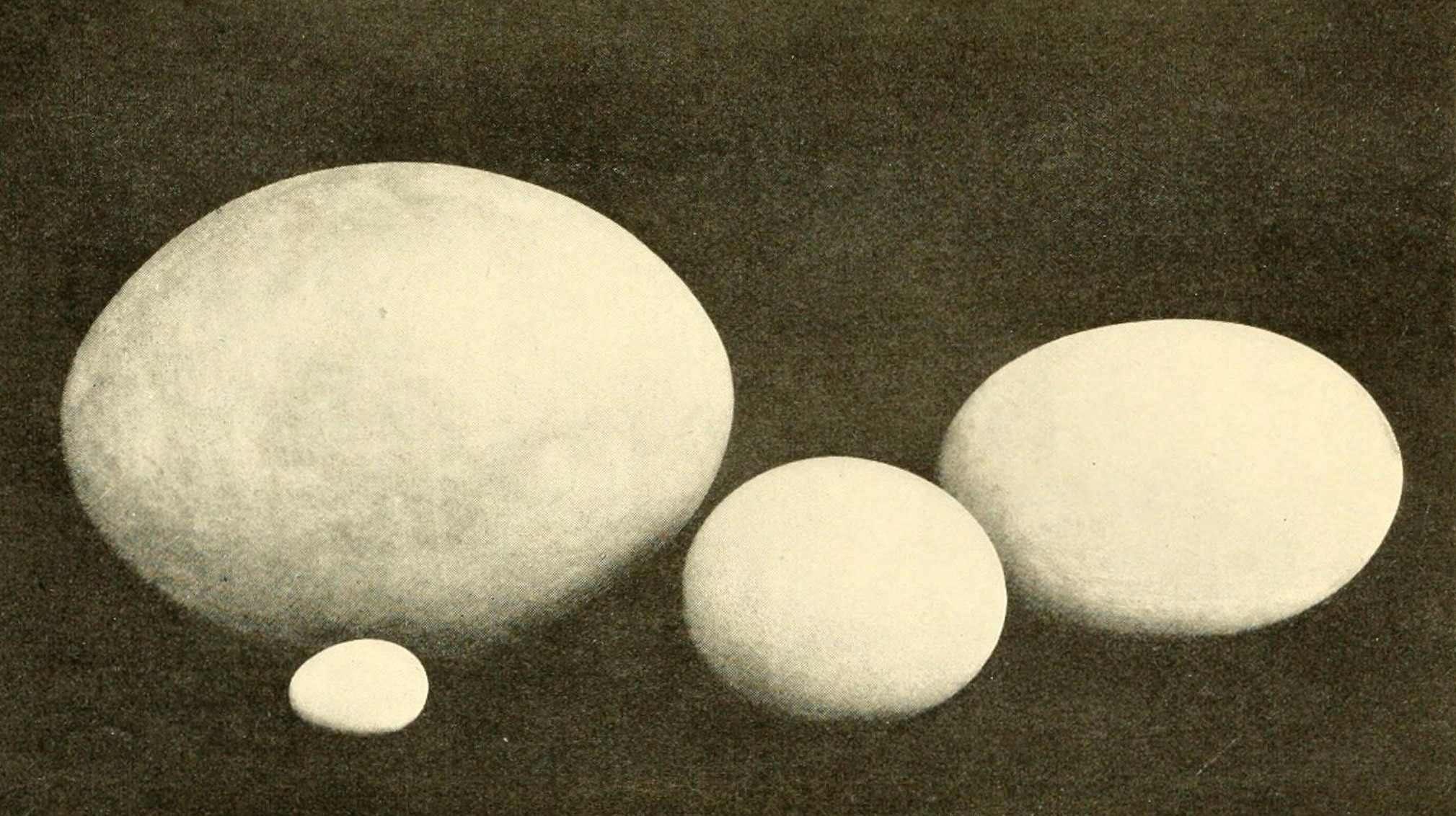
Eggs of Aepyornis (top left) chicken (bottom left) moa (right) and ostrich (centre)

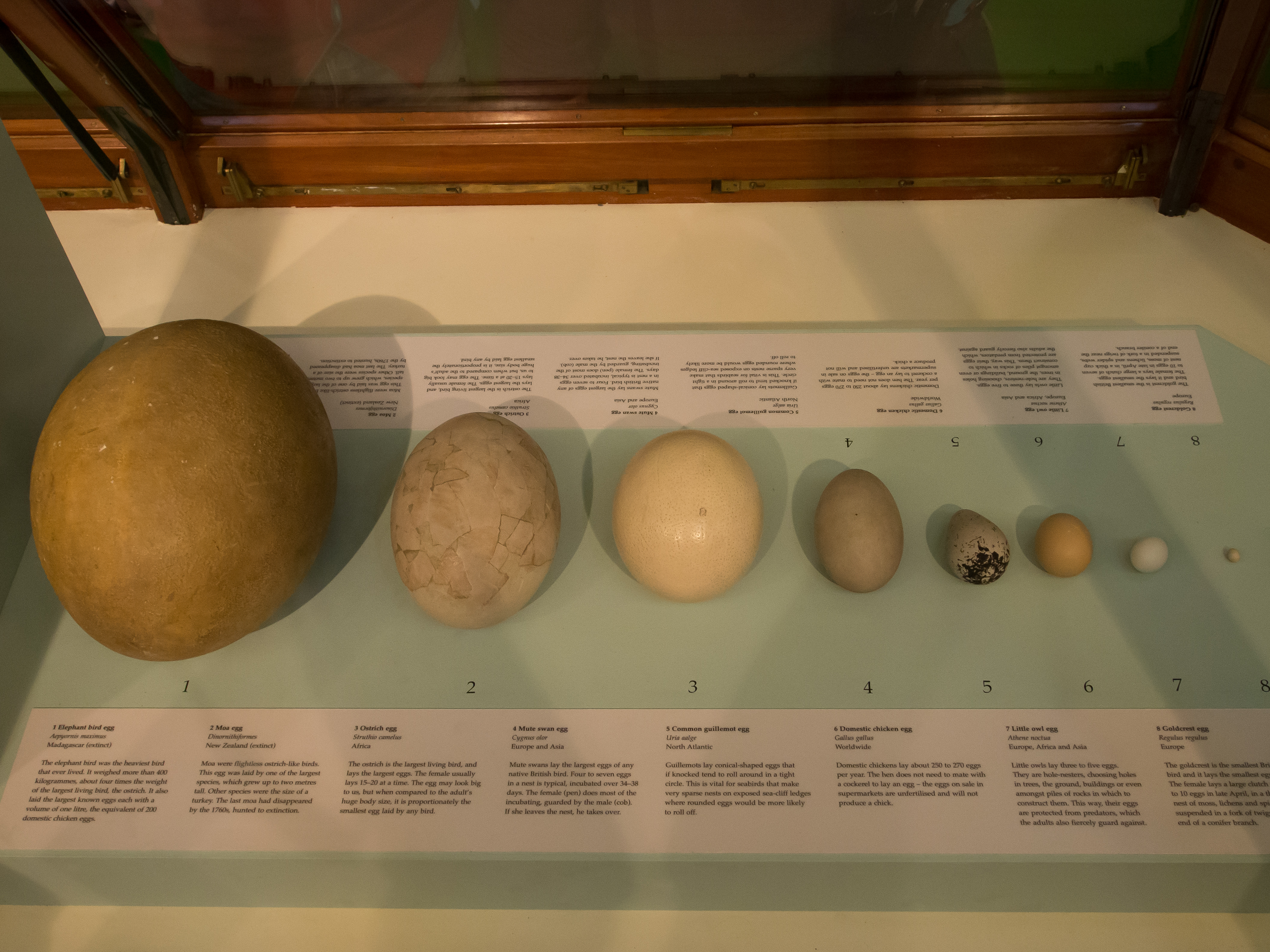
Aepyornis maximus egg (far left, 1) in comparison to other eggs, including ostrich egg (centre, 3) and chicken egg (third from right, 6)

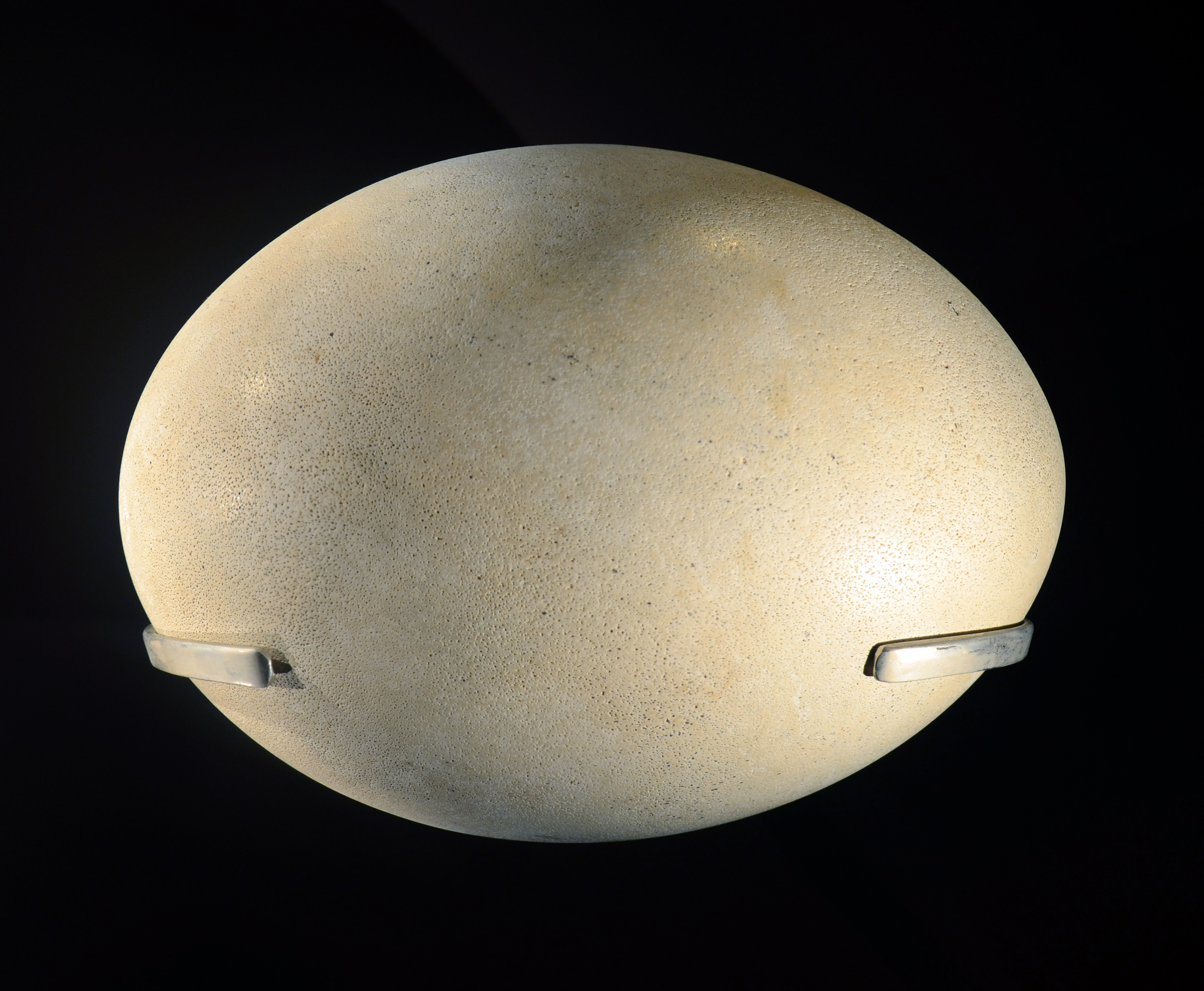
Well preserved egg showing porous surface

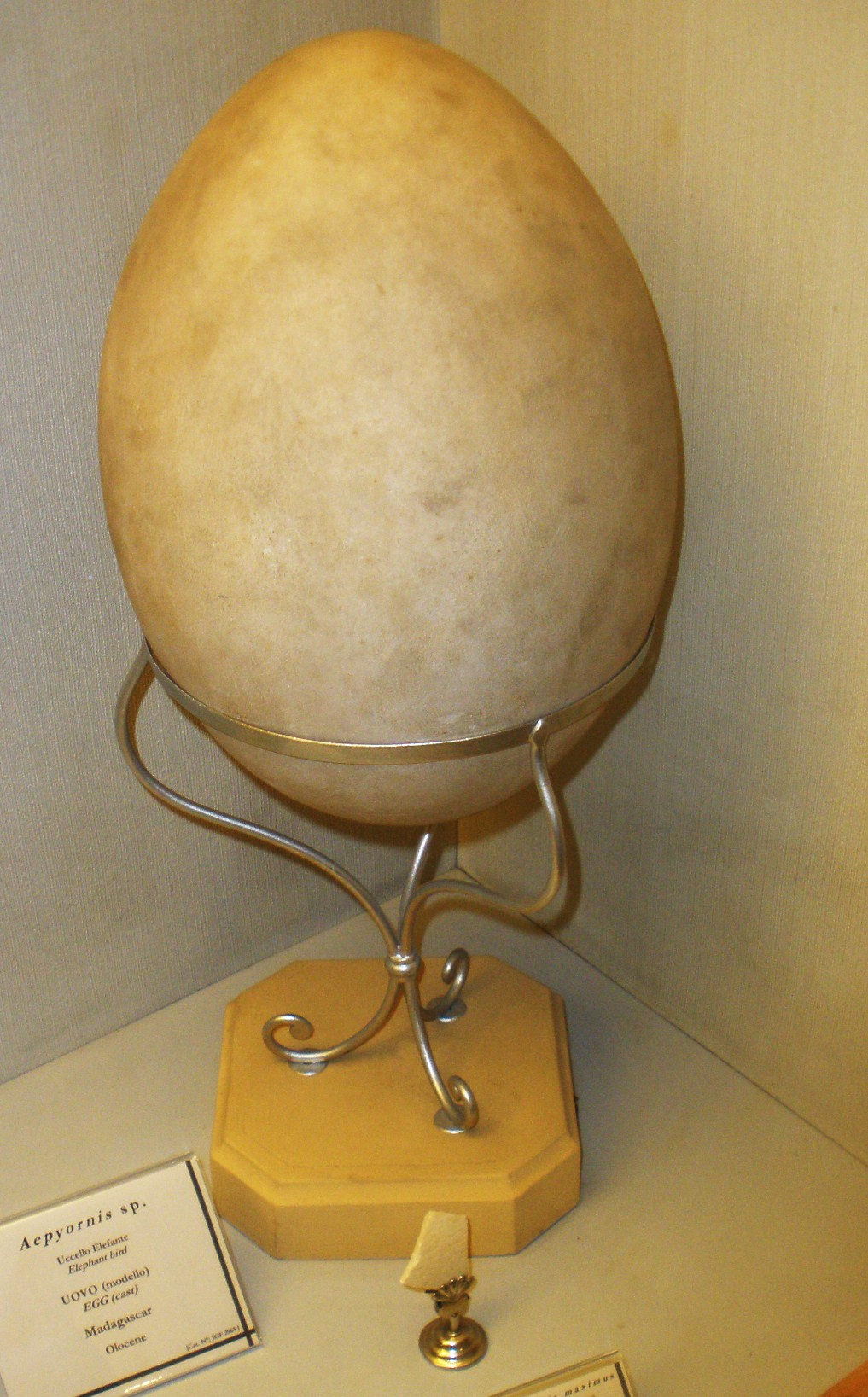
Egg of Aepyornis standing upright

== Extinction ==
It is widely believed that the extinction of elephant birds was a result of human activity. The birds were initially widespread, occurring from the northern to the southern tip of Madagascar. The late Holocene also witnessed the extinction of other Malagasy animals, including several species of Malagasy hippopotamus, two species of giant tortoise (Aldabrachelys abrupta and Aldabrachelys grandidieri), the giant fossa, over a dozen species of giant lemurs, the aardvark-like animal Plesiorycteropus, and the crocodile Voay. Several elephant bird bones with incisions have been dated to approximately 10,000 BC which some authors suggest are cut marks, which have been proposed as evidence of a long history of coexistence between elephant birds and humans; however, these conclusions conflict with more commonly accepted evidence of a much shorter history of human presence on the island and remain controversial. The oldest securely dated evidence for humans on Madagascar dates to the mid-first millennium AD.

A 2021 study suggested that elephant birds, along with the Malagasy hippopotamus species, became extinct in the interval 800–1050 AD (1150–900 years Before Present), based on the timing of the latest radiocarbon dates. The timing of the youngest radiocarbon dates coincided with major environmental alteration across Madagascar by humans changing forest into grassland, probably for cattle pastoralism, with the environmental change likely being induced by the use of fire. This reduction of forested area may have had cascade effects, like making elephant birds more likely to be encountered by hunters, though there is little evidence of human hunting of elephant birds. Humans may have utilized elephant bird eggs. Introduced diseases (hyperdisease) have been proposed as a cause of extinction, but the plausibility for this is weakened due to the evidence of centuries of overlap between humans and elephant birds on Madagascar.

== See also ==
- Late Quaternary prehistoric birds
- Holocene extinction
