= A Deal in Ostriches =

- Short story by H. G. Wells
- Country: United Kingdom
- Language: English

Publication
- Publication date: 1894

"A Deal in Ostriches" is a short story by the British writer H. G. Wells. It is a cautionary tale about simple human greed. The taxidermist of Wells’ story "Triumphs of a Taxidermist" (1894) makes a return appearance as the narrator of the story.

== Background ==
The story was originally published anonymously in the December 20th, 1894 issue of the Pall Mall Gazette and later republished in the 1895 short story collection The Stolen Bacillus and Other Incidents. The story is the tale of a carefully crafted and skillfully executed con or scam that exploited the natural greed of the protagonist's fellow passengers.

== Plot ==
A taxidermist is talking with an unnamed acquaintance about the price of birds when he tells the story of a bird auction on an East India Company ship en route from India to London. Sir Mohini Padishah, a wealthy native Indian, is aboard the vessel. An unnamed caretaker is on deck with five ostriches when one of the birds swallows the diamond from Padishah’s turban. The bird becomes mixed with the others during the resulting confusion. Word of the incident sweeps the vessel as Padishah demands the return of the diamond. He swears he will retrieve the diamond, but will not buy the birds. He demands his rights as a British Subject and plans to appeal to the British House of Lords.

The passengers debate the legalities of the situation. As no barrister is aboard, much of the discussions are speculation. Padishah demands the ostriches from the caretaker, who refuses because he does not own the birds. Following a stopover in Aden, Padishah offers to buy all five birds. The caretaker refuses, but tells Padishah that another passenger, Potter, made a similar offer. While in Aden, Potter wired the birds' owners in London, made the offer and his answer would be waiting in Suez. He intends to kill the birds to find the diamond. Padisha rages over this and the taxidermist curses himself for not having thought of it.

The birds’ owner accepts Potter’s offer, and Padishah weeps over the sale. Potter offers to sell the birds to Padishah for more than twice the amount he paid. When Padishah balks, Potter sells the birds at auction on the ship. Interest in the auction flares when a Jewish diamond merchant assesses the diamond at three to four thousand British pounds. After the first bird sold is slaughtered upon the deck, Potter forbids their slaughter until landfall in London. The price for each subsequent bird grows, netting Potter more than one thousand pounds. Padishah provides each new owner with his address and begs the men to mail the diamond once they find it. They rebuff him and go their own ways.

A week later, the taxidermist sees Padishah and Potter together in London. Padishah was an eminent Hindu, the diamond was indeed real, but the taxidermist doubts the bird swallowed the diamond.
