= Triumphs of a Taxidermist =

- Short story by H. G. Wells
- Country: United Kingdom
- Language: English
- Genre: short story

Publication
- Publication date: 1894

"Triumphs of a Taxidermist" is an 1894 short story by British writer H. G. Wells. The story was originally published anonymously in the March 3 and 15, 1894 issues of the Pall Mall Gazette and later published in the 1895 short story collection The Stolen Bacillus and Other Incidents.

== Plot summary ==
Bellows visits a friend, the taxidermist of the title, in the latter’s home. Like much of Wells’ fiction, the Taxidermist remains unnamed and the story is a concealed assault on the English culture of the time of its writing. The Taxidermist proudly tells the younger man of his accomplishments both grotesque and fraudulent.

The Taxidermist once stuffed a black man stating "I made him with all his fingers out, and used him as a hat rack..." Unfortunately, a man named Hornesby "got up in a quarrel with him...and spoilt him." The Taxidermist dismissively stated that if it was not so hard to get skins he would have made another. He defends this practice by proclaiming that taxidermy is a third option to burial and cremation.

The Taxidermist claims that about half of the stuffed great auks are fakes and admits to having faked one himself. He proceeds to briefly explain how it is done using the feathers of other birds.

The Taxidermist reports that he has even forged a specimen of an extinct species of bird. He justifies this as giving his own push to the advancement of science.

The Taxidermist claims to have created a nonexistent species of New Zealand bird. The species was described in an old German pamphlet and appears to be a confused combination of an existent species and one long extinct. A local collector, Javvers, swore he would have a specimen. The Taxidermist fashioned the creature and sold it to Javvers.

== Continuity ==
The Taxidermist of the title also appears in a second story, A Deal in Ostriches, published during the same year.
