= Æpyornis Island =

Short story by H. G. Wells

- Short story by H. G. Wells
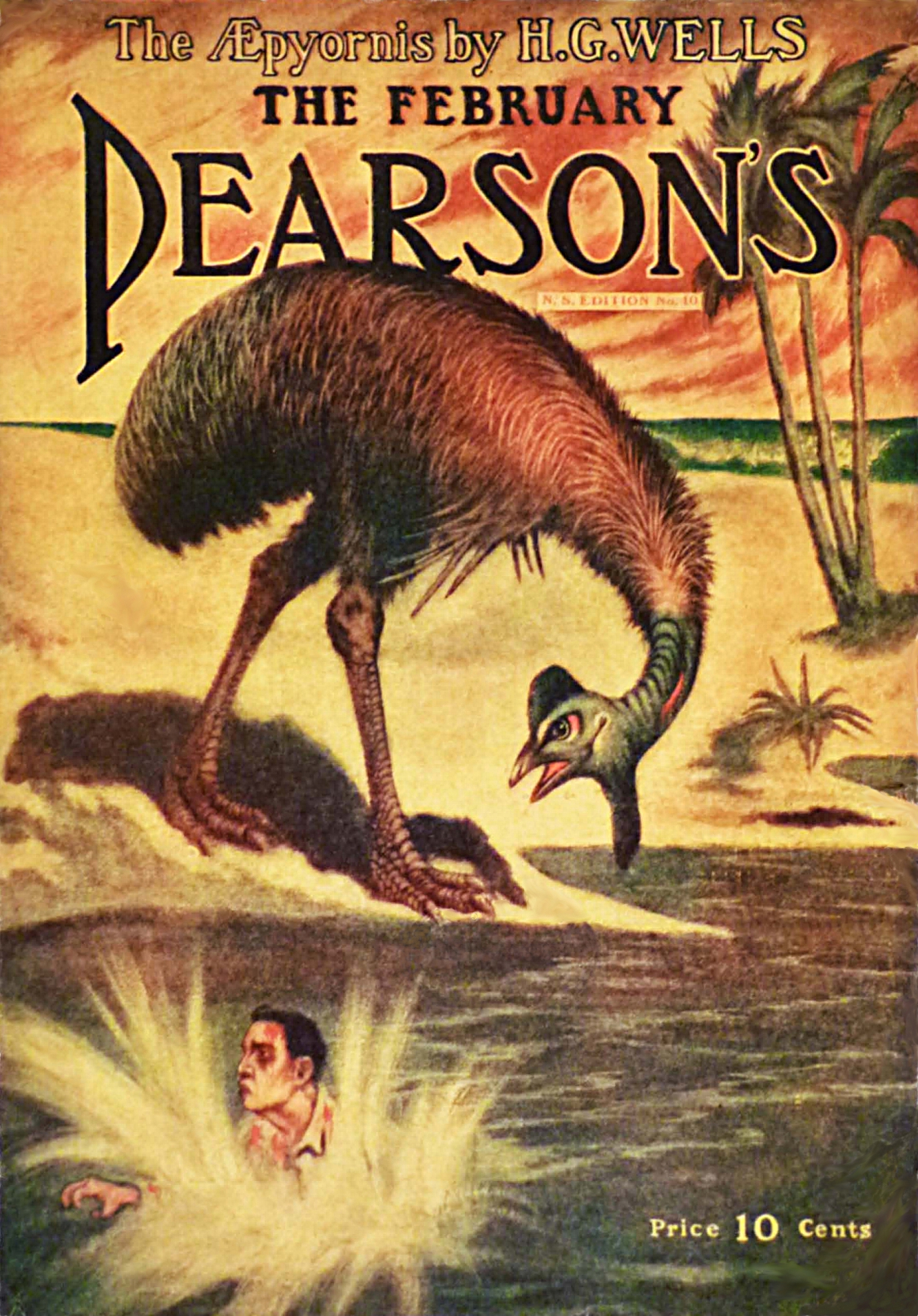
- The cover of Pearson's Magazine that illustrates "Æpyornis Island", 1905.
- Country: United Kingdom
- Genre: Science fiction

Publication
- Published in: Pall Mall Budget
- Media type: Print
- Publication date: 27 December 1894

"Æpyornis Island", or "Aepyornis Island", is a short story by H. G. Wells, first published in 1894 in the Pall Mall Budget. It was included in The Stolen Bacillus and Other Incidents, the first collection of short stories by Wells, first published in 1895.

In the story, a man looking for eggs of Aepyornis, an extinct flightless bird, passes two years alone on a small island with an Aepyornis that has hatched.

== Historical background ==
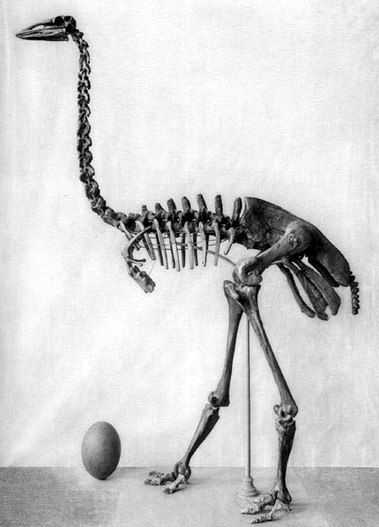
Aepyornis maximus skeleton and egg

Aepyornis maximus (the giant elephant-bird) was a giant flightless bird that lived in Madagascar. They became extinct sometime around 1000 AD, probably as a result of human activity. The bird was more than 2 metres (6 ft 7 in) tall, and its egg weighed about 10 kilograms (22 lb). Fragments of the eggs are still found.

== Story summary ==
The narrator starts a conversation with a rough individual named Butcher in an unspecified foreign location. Remembering reports of a court case years earlier, in which Butcher sued his employer for salary accrued while cast away on a desert island for four years, the narrator encourages him to tell the story related to the case:

Butcher, employed by a collector, is engaged in finding Aepyornis eggs. He is looking for them in a swamp on the east coast of Madagascar, helped by two native assistants in a canoe who are probing the mud with iron rods. They find several whole eggs but one is dropped by an assistant who says that he was bitten by a centipede. Butcher beats the assistant, as a result of which both natives conspire to maroon him on the island with three days' provisions. When Butcher sees them leaving in the canoe, he shoots the uninjured assistant dead with his revolver. He then swims out to intercept the drifting canoe and reaches it by nightfall, finding that the other assistant has also died of a snake, scorpion, or centipede bite. As the canoe has no paddle, Butcher cannot steer it and drifts for ten days. During this period, he eats two of the Aepyornis eggs, finding that the embryo of the second egg has started developing due to the tropical heat.

The canoe drifts onto an atoll, where the remaining egg hatches. Butcher calls the young bird Man Friday, after the character in Robinson Crusoe, as it is a welcome companion. For two years, Butcher lives with the bird, feeding it and enjoying its company. At the end of the second year the bird, now about fourteen feet high, suddenly becomes aggressive towards Butcher and attacks him, giving him a scar on his face. He escapes the bird's attack by swimming into the lagoon, but subsequently has to spend his time in the lagoon or up a palm tree to avoid attacks. He eventually manages to capture it using a bolas made out of fishing line and coral and then kills it. He feels guilty and misses its companionship, but soon afterwards is rescued from the atoll. He sells the bones of the bird to a collector; since it is larger than Aepyornis maximus, scientists give it the (fictional) scientific name Aepyornis vastus.
