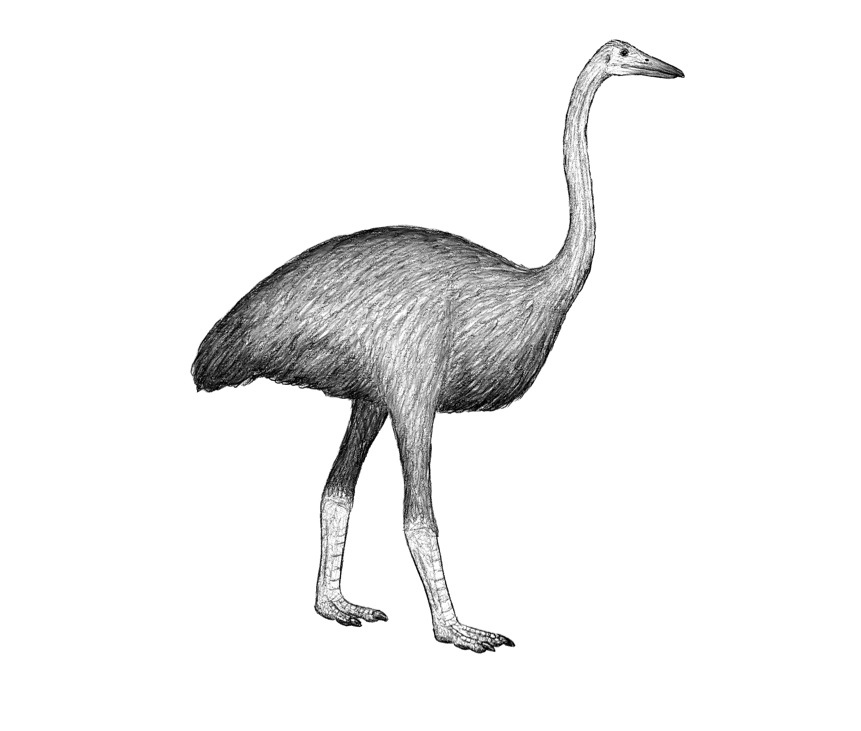
- Life restoration

Scientific classification
- Kingdom: Animalia
- Phylum: Chordata
- Class: Aves
- Infraclass: Palaeognathae
- Order: †Aepyornithiformes
- Genus: †Mullerornis; Milne-Edwards & Grandidier 1894

Type species
- Mullerornis betsilei Milne-Edwards & Grandidier 1894

Species
- M. modestus (Milne-Edwards & Grandidier, 1869) Hansford & Turvey 2018
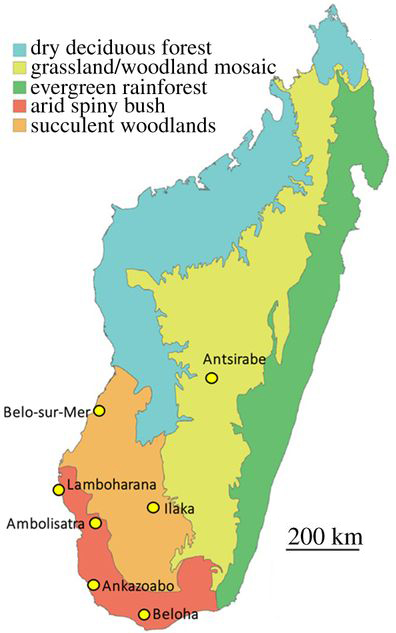
- Map of Madagascar showing where specimens have been found

Synonyms
- Flacourtia Andrews 1895; Aepyornis modestus Milne-Edwards & Grandidier 1869; Mullerornis agilis Milne-Edwards & Grandidier, 1894; Mullerornis betsilei Milne-Edwards & Grandidier, 1894; Mullerornis rudis Milne-Edwards & Grandidier, 1894; Flacourtia rudis (Milne-Edwards & Grandidier 1894) Andrews 1895; ?Mullerornis grandis Lamberton 1934

= Mullerornis =

Mullerornis Temporal range: Quaternary

Extinct species of birds

Mullerornis modestus is an extinct species of elephant bird, and the only member of the genus Mullerornis.

== Taxonomy ==
The genus Mullerornis was described in 1894 by Alphonse Milne-Edwards & Alfred Grandidier. The genus is named after Georges Muller, a French explorer, who was killed in 1892 by hostile members of the Sakalava people.

=== Synonyms of Mullerornis modestus ===
- Mullerornis betsilei Milne-Edwards & Grandidier, 1894 (Betsileo elephant bird)
- Mullerornis agilis Milne-Edwards & Grandidier, 1894 (agile/coastal elephant bird)
- Mullerornis rudis Milne-Edwards & Grandidier, 1894 (robust elephant bird)
- ?Mullerornis grandis Lamberton 1934 (holotype destroyed in a fire in 1995)

== Description ==
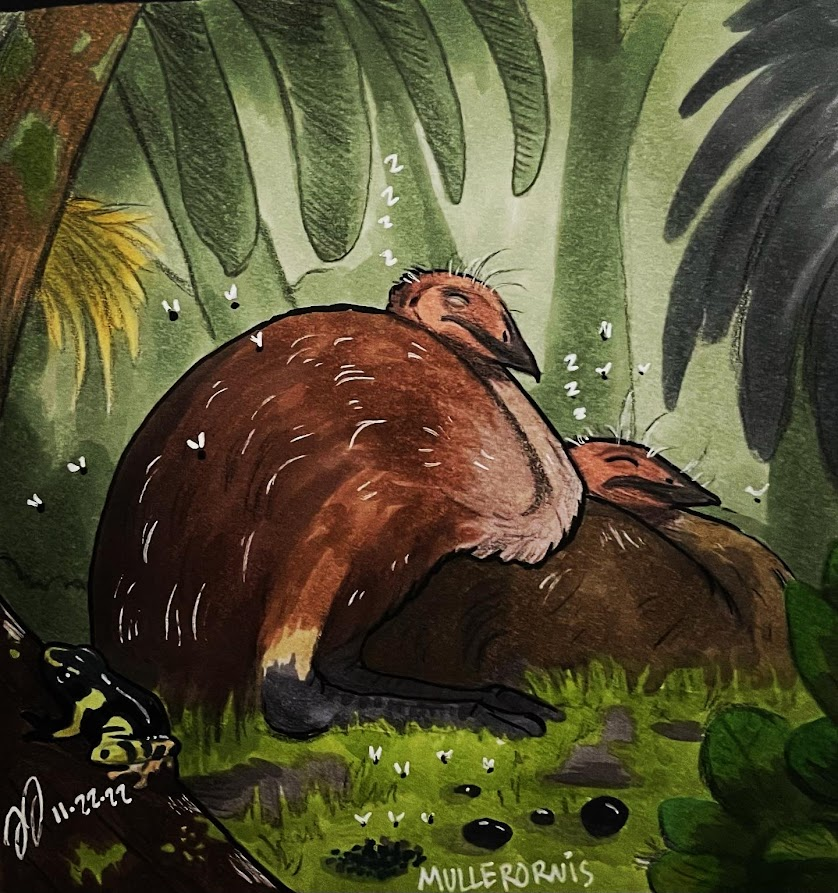
Artist's stylized impression of a M. modestus pair roosting during the day.

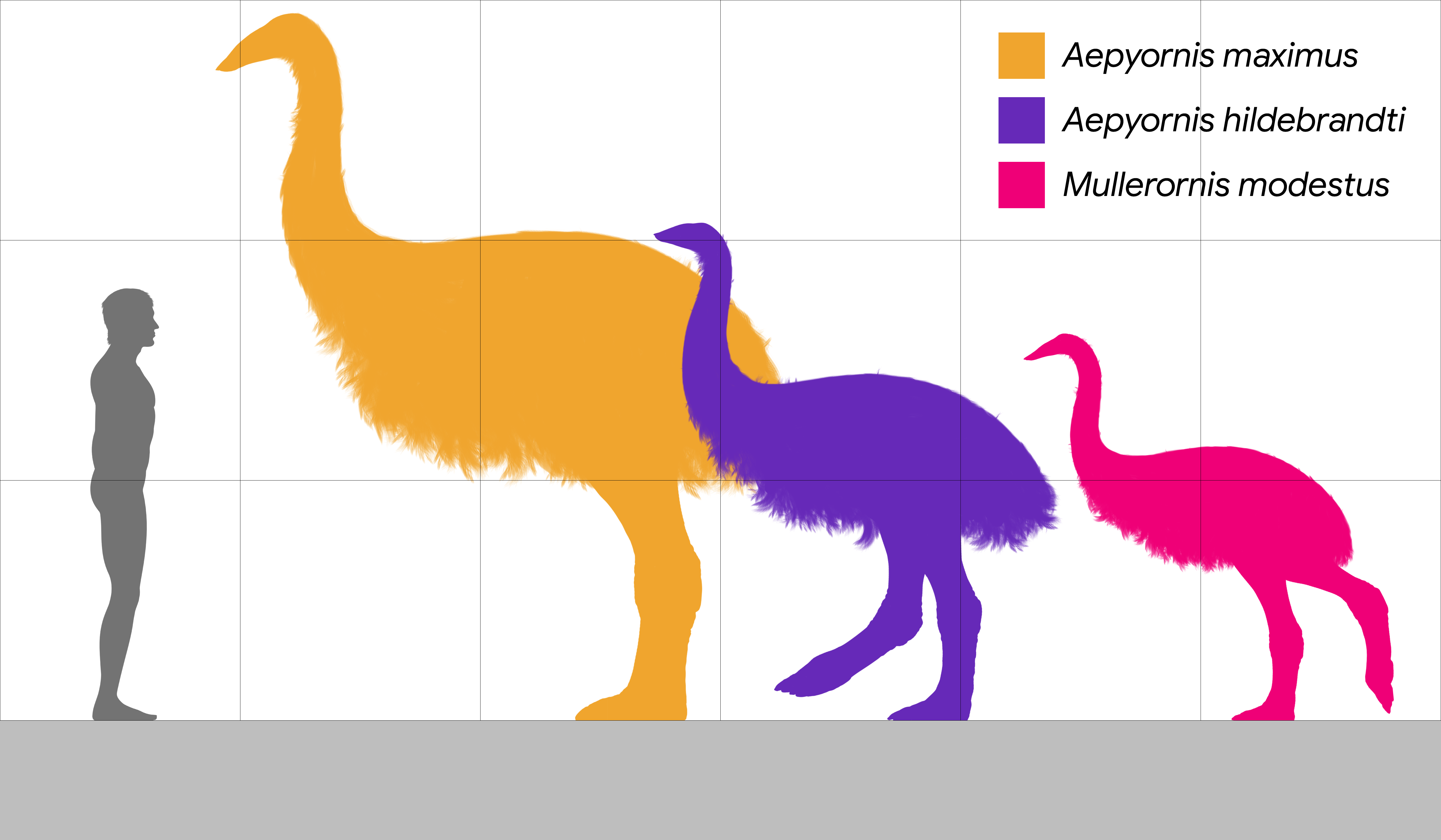
Size comparison of Mulleornis (in pink) as well as other elephant bird species compared to a human

Mullerornis is smaller than the more well-known Aepyornis, with a still substantial body mass of approximately 80 kilograms (180 lb), along with a height of 1.49 meters (4.88 ft). A bone possibly belonging to Mullerornis has been radiocarbon dated to about 1260 BP, suggesting that the animal was still extant at the end of the first millennium. Aepyornis modestus was shown by Hansford and Turvey (2018) to be a senior synonym of all nominal Mullerornis species described by Milne-Edwards and Grandidier (1894), resulting in the new combination Mullerornis modestus.

== Palaeobiology ==
=== Nocturnality ===
Like other elephant birds and its kiwi relatives, Mullerornis probably was nocturnal based on the small size of its optic lobes, though it shows less optical lobe reduction than these other taxa, implying slightly more crepuscular habits.

=== Diet ===
Isotopic evidence suggests that Mullerornis was likely a browsing herbivore.

=== Reproduction ===
The eggs of Mullerornis are substantially smaller than those of Aepyornis, weighting approximately 0.86 kilograms (1.9 lb), with a shell thickness of about 1.1 mm (3/64 in).
