= The Doings of Raffles Haw =

1891 novel by Arthur Conan Doyle

- Author: Sir Arthur Ignatius Conan Doyle
- Language: English
- Genre: Science fiction
- Published: 1891 (Pittsburgh Commercial)

The Doings of Raffles Haw (1891) is a science fiction novel authored by Sir Arthur Conan Doyle involving an inventor who has discovered a way to turn lead into gold.

== Plot outline ==
A mysterious millionaire, Raffles Haw, comes to reside in Tamfield in Staffordshire. Prior to his arrival, locals gossip about him. As his house is being constructed, people wonder at the number of workers, their speed, and the complete disregard for the amount of money spent. When Haw arrives, he acquaints himself with the McIntyre family, which consists of Robert, his sister Laura, and their father. McIntyre senior had been a prosperous gun merchant, but has gone bankrupt and lost his sanity. Laura is engaged to Hector, the son of the vicar, Mr. Spurling. Hector is a sailor who is summoned for Naval duty at the beginning of the novel.

Disregarding McIntyre senior as a greedy beggar, Haw sets about to alleviate the misery of the people of Tamfield through the agency of the McIntyre siblings and Mr. Spurling. He saves many families and businesses with his timely financial succour. He has limitless funds, due to having discovered a process to turn lead into gold.

With the passage of time, he becomes disillusioned because his philanthropic activities—though they improve the situations of the recipients—don't improve the recipients themselves. Instead of becoming better citizens, most become parasites reliant upon alms from the millionaire. Despondent, he seeks the counsel of his fiancée, Laura McIntyre, the one person he supposes to be true to him. Unbeknownst to him, Laura has accepted his proposal of marriage without ending her previous engagement to Hector Spurling. As Raffles and Laura are talking, Hector enters the room, his service having ended earlier than expected. When Raffles discovers Laura and Hector are still engaged, he is heartbroken. The fallen millionaire locks himself in his laboratory, destroys his equipment and his immense fortune, and later is found dead. The process that he used to build his fortune is unrecoverable.

== Reception ==
Dave Langford in a review White Dwarf #83, said that "Doyle has an old and familiar tale to tell: The Well-Meaning (but Mad) Scientist who can Make Gold, yet like King Midas finds out that Wealth Is But A Curse. Fascinating for collectors and completists."

== Reviews ==
- Review by Don D'Ammassa (1986) in Science Fiction Chronicle, #87 December 1986
- Review by John R. Pfeiffer (1986) in Fantasy Review, December 1986
- Review by Chris Bailey (1986) in Vector 135
- Review by Everett F. Bleiler (1991) in Science Fiction: The Early Years

== See also ==
- "The Diamond Maker", an 1894 short story by H. G. Wells
