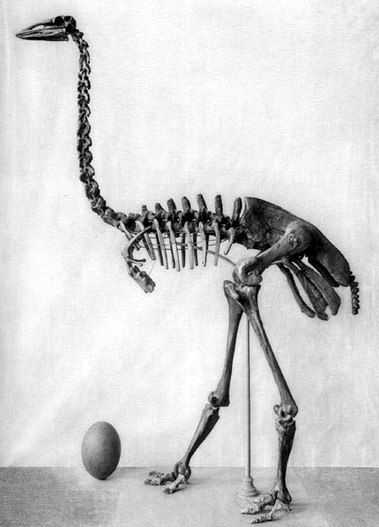
- Aepyornis maximus skeleton and egg

Conservation status
- Extinct (1000 AD)

Scientific classification
- Kingdom: Animalia
- Phylum: Chordata
- Class: Aves
- Infraclass: Palaeognathae
- Order: †Aepyornithiformes
- Genus: †Aepyornis; I. Geoffroy Saint-Hilaire, 1851

Type species
- Aepyornis maximus I. Geoffroy Saint-Hilaire 1851

Species
- A. hildebrandti Burckhardt 1893; A. maximus I. Geoffroy Saint-Hilaire 1851
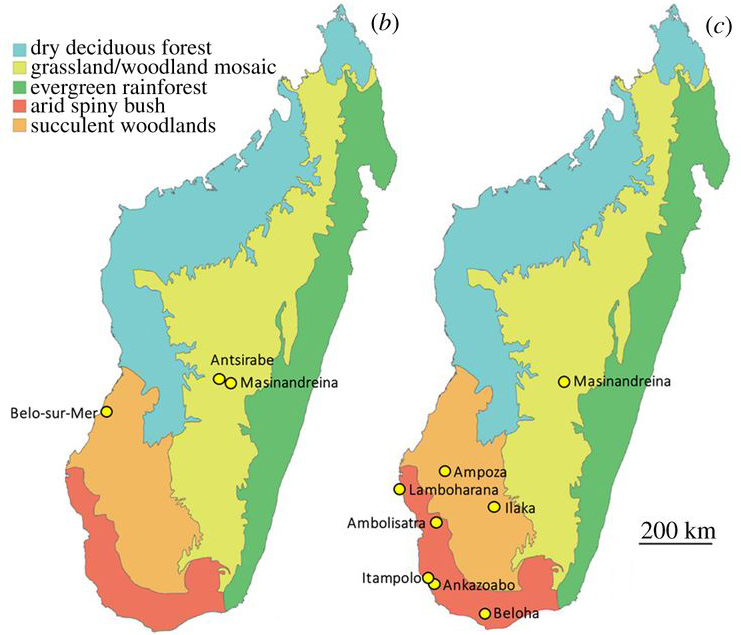
- Map of Madagascar showing where A. hildebrandti (b) and A. maximus (c) specimens have been found

Synonyms
- Vorombe? Hansford & Turvey, 2018

= Aepyornis =

Aepyornis Temporal range: Quaternary

Extinct genus of birds

Aepyornis is an extinct genus of elephant bird formerly endemic to Madagascar. The genus had two species, the smaller A. hildebrandti and the larger A. maximus, which is possibly the largest bird ever to have lived. Its closest living relative is the New Zealand kiwi. The genus became extinct sometime around AD 1000, probably as a result of human activity.

== Taxonomy ==
Brodkorb (1963) listed four species of Aepyornis as valid: A. hildebrandti, A. gracilis, A. medius and A. maximus. However, Hume and Walters (2012) listed only one species, A. maximus. Most recently, Hansford and Turvey (2018) recognized only A. hildebrandti and A. maximus.

- ?Aepyornis grandidieri Rowley 1867 nomen dubium
- Aepyornis hildebrandti Burckhardt, 1893
  - Aepyornis gracilis Monnier, 1913
  - Aepyornis lentus Milne-Edwards & Grandidier, 1894
  - ?Aepyornis minimus
  - ?Aepyornis mulleri Milne-Edwards & Grandidier, 1894
- Aepyornis maximus Hilaire, 1851
  - Aepyornis cursor Milne-Edwards & Grandidier, 1894
  - ?Aepyornis intermedius
  - Aepyornis medius Milne-Edwards & Grandidier, 1866
  - Vorombe titan (Andrews 1894) Hansford & Turvey 2018,

The nominate species Aepyornis titan Andrews, 1894, was placed in the separate genus Vorombe by Hansford and Turvey (2018), with A. ingens a synonym of titan. Aepyornis grandidieri Rowley, 1867 is an ootaxon known only from an eggshell fragment and hence a nomen dubium. Hansford and Turvey (2018) also found Aepyornis modestus a senior synonym of all Mullerornis nominal species, making modestus the epithet of the Mullerornis type species. However, later DNA studies found that Vorombe titan was indistinguishable from A. maximus, and probably represented large females of the species.

=== Evolution ===
Like the cassowaries, ostriches, rheas, emu and kiwis, the elephant birds were ratites; they could not fly, and their breast bones had no keel. Because Madagascar and Africa separated before the ratite lineage arose, Aepyornis and other elephant birds are thought to have dispersed and become flightless and gigantic in situ. More recently, it has been deduced from DNA sequence comparisons that the closest living relatives of elephant birds are the New Zealand kiwis, from which they were estimated to have diverged over 50 million years ago.

== Description ==
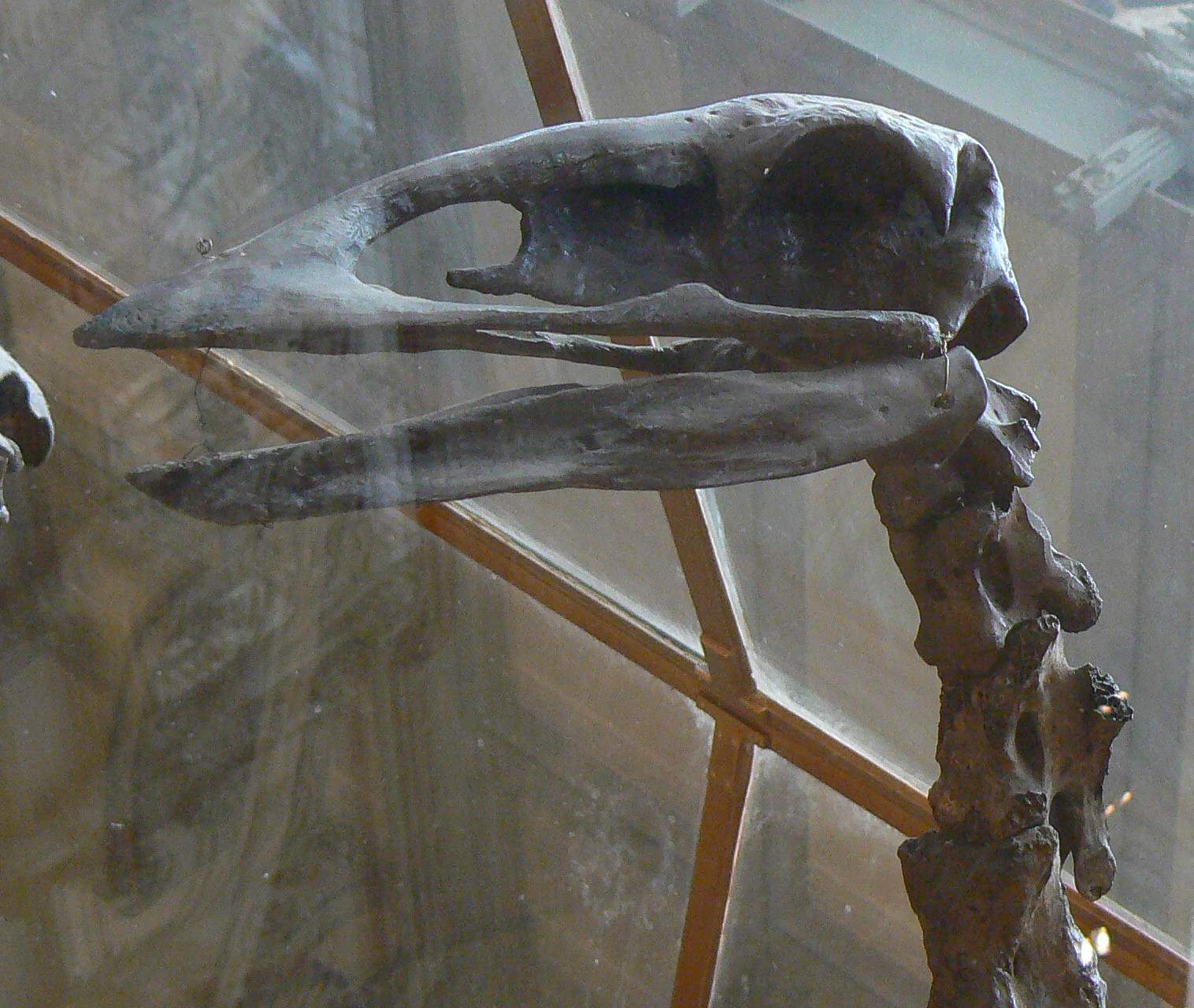
The skull

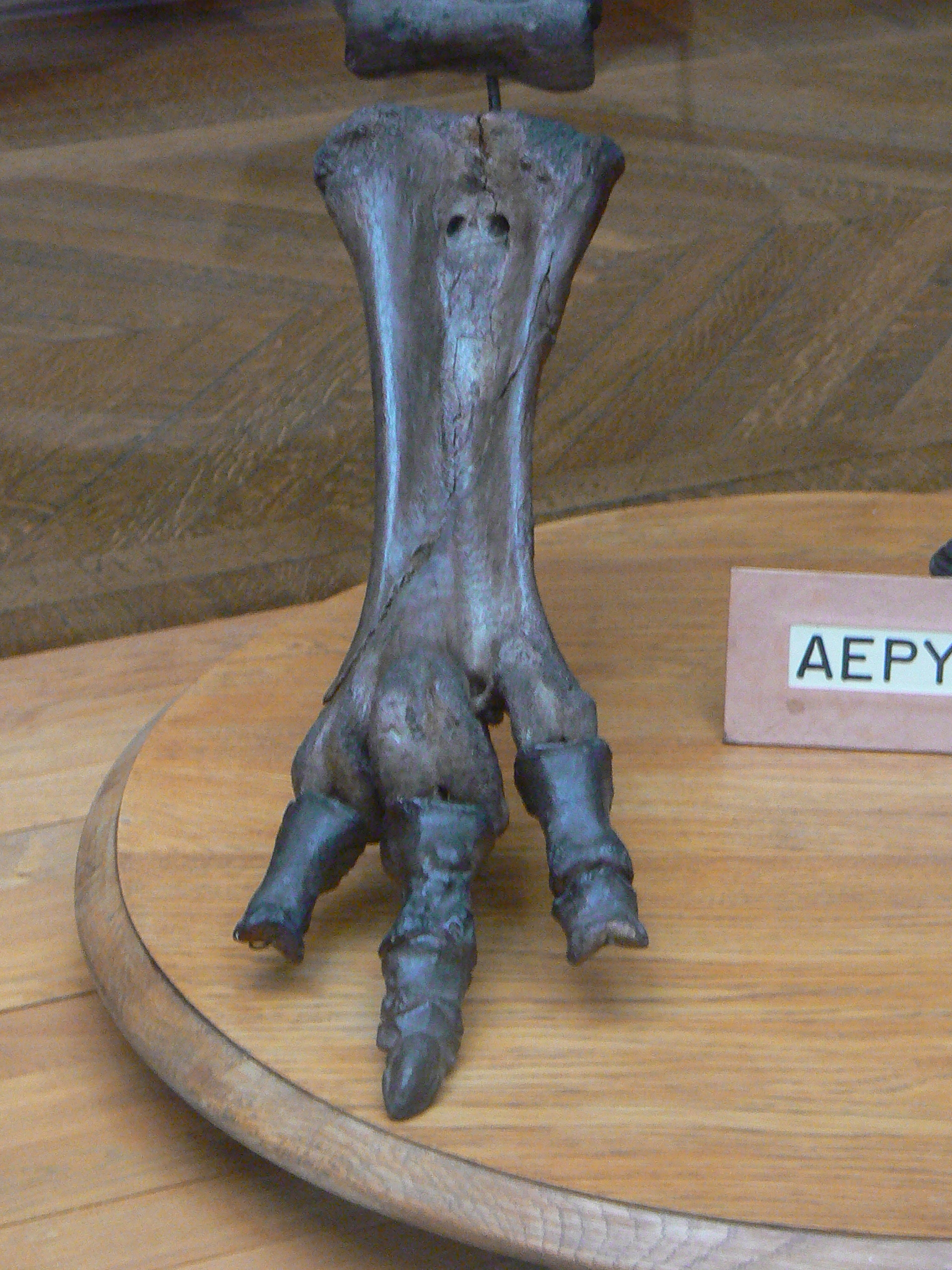
The foot bones
Both photographed at the National Museum of Natural History in Paris

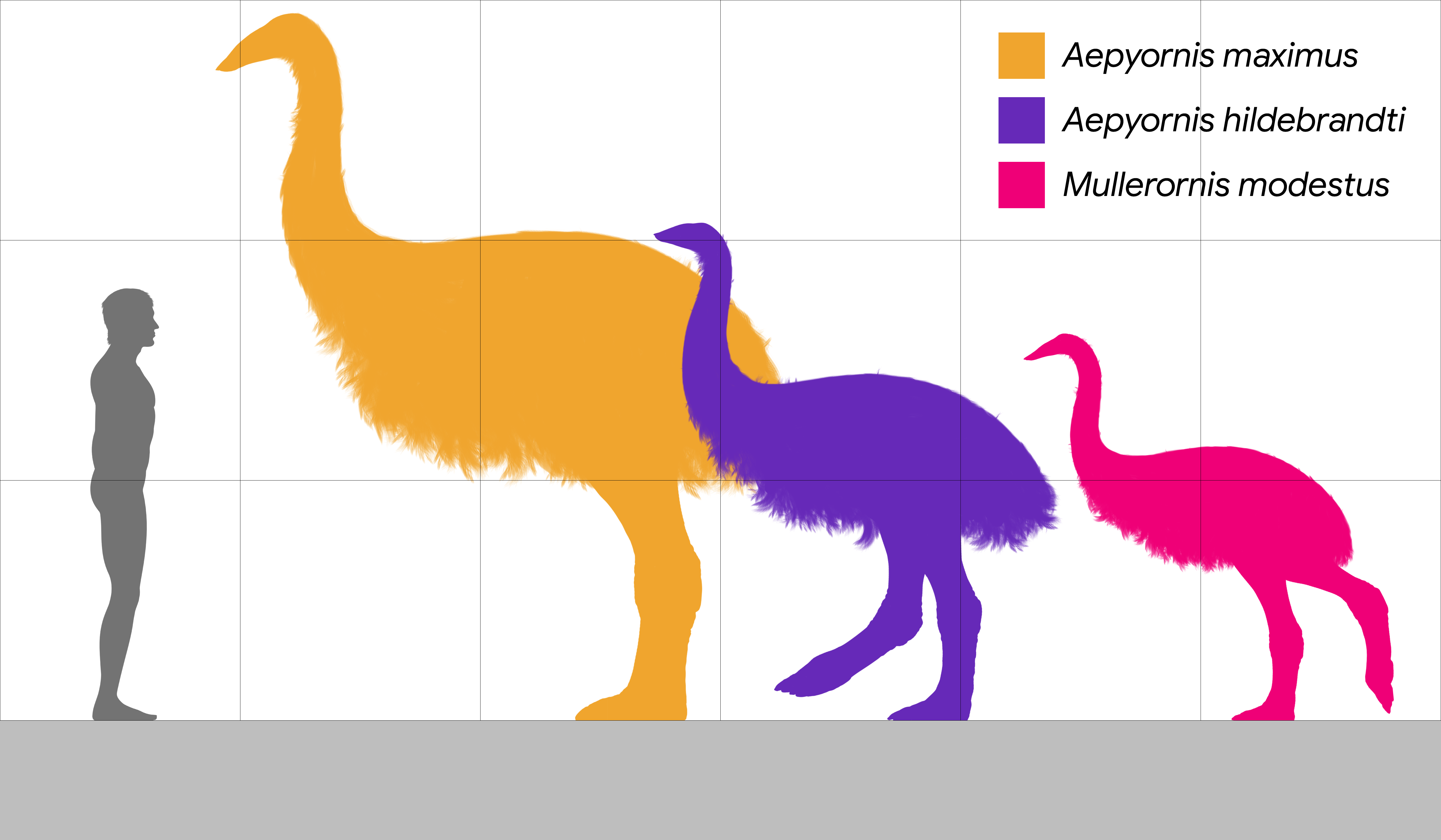
Size comparison of elephant birds to a human, including A. maximus (yellow) and A. hildebrandti (purple)

The species of Aepyornis are amongst the largest birds, with weights of 235 kilograms (520 lb) estimated for A. hildebrandti and 275–1,000 kilograms (610–2,200 lb) for A. maximus, making it one of the largest, if not the largest bird to have ever lived, with the latter reaching 3 metres (9.8 ft) in height. The head bore a straight, thick conical beak, which was proportionally larger in A. hildebrandti than in A. maximus, though the heads in both birds were small relative to body size. The neck was proportionally long, with 16-17 cervical vertebrae. The wings were vestigial. The pelvic bones (vertebrae, ilium and pubis) were heavily fused to each other, so much so that their boundaries are difficult to discern. The hindlimb was proportionally long, with its bones being robust, with the femur in particular being very short and thick. The tibiotarsus has a prominent longitudinal ridge for muscle attachment. There is no evidence for the presence of a fourth toe or spur. The terminal toe bones (phalanges) of the foot are broad and not hooked. The females of A. maximus are suggested to have been larger than the males, as is observed in other ratites.

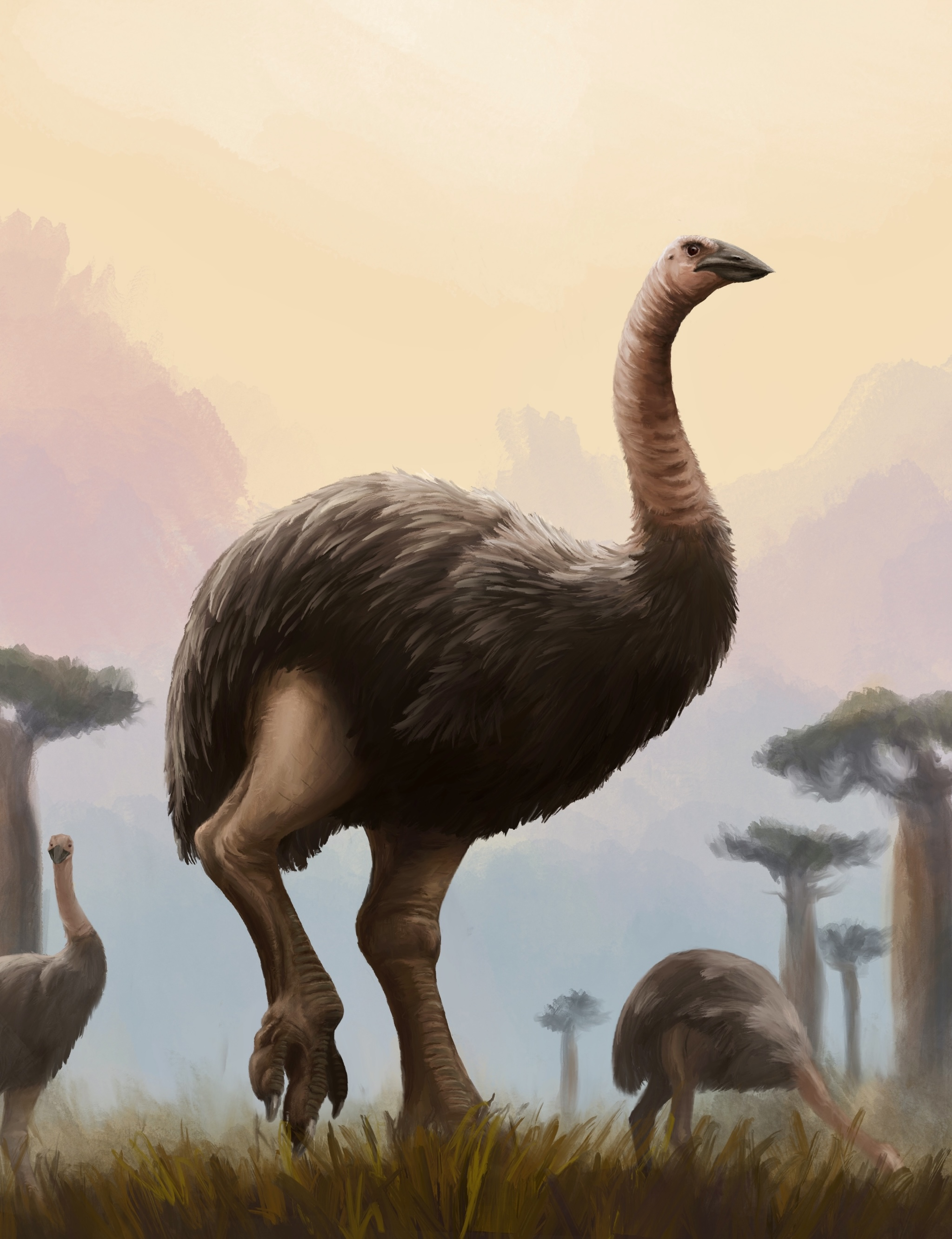
Life restoration

== Ecology ==
Examination of brain endocasts has shown that both A. maximus and A. hildebrandti had greatly reduced optic lobes, similar to those of their closest living relatives, the kiwis, and consistent with a similar nocturnal lifestyle. A. maximus had relatively larger olfactory bulbs than A. hildebrandti, suggesting that the former occupied forested habitats where the sense of smell is more useful while the latter occupied open habitats. Elephant birds are suggested to have grown in periodic spurts rather than having continuous growth. A 2022 isotope analysis study suggested that individuals of Aepyornis hildebrandti from central Madagascar were mixed feeders that had a large (~48%) grazing component to its diet, similar to that of the living Rhea americana, while A. maximus was probably a browser. Isotope analysis of eggshells attributed to a population of A. hildebrandti from northern Madagascar suggests that this population were probably browsers rather than mixed feeders.

An embryonic skeleton of Aepyornis is known from an intact egg, around 80-90% of the way through incubation before it died. This skeleton shows that even at this early ontogenetic stage that the skeleton was robust, much more so than comparable hatchling ostriches or rheas. The eggs of Aepyornis are the largest known for any amniote, and have a volume of around 5.6–13 litres, and a length of approximately 26–40 centimetres (10–16 in) and a width of 19–25 centimetres (7.5–9.8 in). The egg is about 160 times greater volume than a chicken egg. The large size of elephant bird eggs means that they would have required substantial amounts of calcium, which is usually taken from a reservoir in the medullary bone in the femurs of female birds. Possible remnants of this tissue have been described from the femurs of A. maximus.

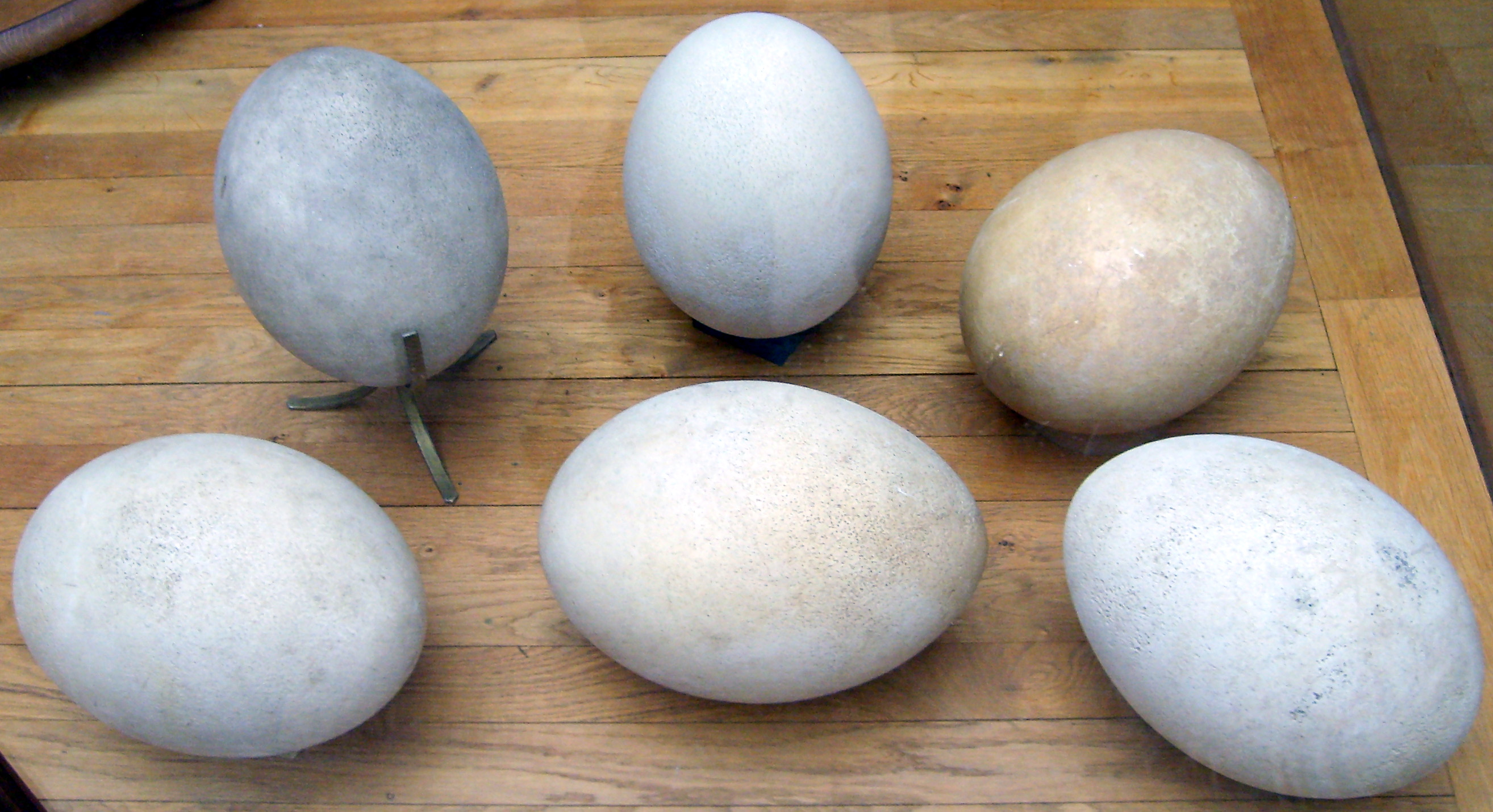
Aepyornis eggs, Muséum national d'Histoire naturelle, Paris

== Extinction ==
The extinction of Aepyornis was likely due to human activity after the arrival of humans on Madagascar. The birds were initially widespread, occurring from the northern to the southern tip of Madagascar. One theory—the blitzkrieg hypothesis—contends that humans hunted the elephant birds to extinction in a very short time after their arrival. There is indeed evidence that they were killed. However, their eggs may have been the most vulnerable point in their life cycle. A recent archaeological study found fragments of eggshells among the remains of human fires, suggesting that the eggs regularly provided meals for entire families.

The exact time period when they died out is also not certain; tales of these giant birds may have persisted for centuries in folk memory. There is archaeological evidence of giant elephant bird (A. maximus) from a radiocarbon-dated bone at 1880 +/- 70 BP (c. AD 120) with signs of butchering, and on the basis of radiocarbon dating of shells, about 1000 BP (= c. AD 1000). It is thought that the A. maximus is the Malagasy legendary extinct animal called the vorompatra (pronounced [vuˈrumpə̥ʈʂ]), Malagasy for "bird of open spaces". After many years of failed attempts, DNA molecules of Aepyornis eggs were successfully extracted by a group of international researchers and the results were published in 2010 in the Proceedings of the Royal Society B.

It has also been suggested that the extinction was a secondary effect of human impact due to transfer of hyperdiseases from human commensals, such as chickens and guineafowl. The bones of these domesticated fowl have been found in subfossil sites on the island (MacPhee and Marx, 1997: 188), such as Ambolisatra (Madagascar), where Mullerornis modestus and A. maximus have been reported.

== See also ==
- Island gigantism
- "Æpyornis Island", an 1894 short story by H. G. Wells that features the bird
