= Winners & Losers season 3 =

Season of television series

Winners & Losers
- Season 3
- Region 4 DVD cover
- No. of episodes: 26

Release
- Original network: Seven Network
- Original release: 9 July 2013 – 24 June 2014

Season chronology
- ← Previous; Season 2 Next → Season 4

The third season of the television drama series Winners & Losers was aired in three parts on the Seven Network in Australia. Season 3A – comprising 13 episodes – aired from 9 July to 25 September 2013 while Season 3B – comprising 13 episodes – aired from 28 January to 24 June 2014, before the immediate start of season 4. It replaced Packed to the Rafters due to the series ending. Season three follows the lives of Jenny, Bec, Sophie and Frances four months on from the death of Bec's husband Matt. Filming for the season began in September 2012 and wrapped in July 2013.

== Production ==
On 7 August 2012, it was announced that Seven has renewed Winners & Losers for a third season to air in 2013.

Julie McGauran, the head of Drama at Seven stated, "2013 is going to be a landmark year for Channel Seven's drama department. Our drama slate is at full capacity with the return of Winners & Losers as well as Packed to the Rafters, Home and Away and the new drama A Place to Call Home." Filming for the third season began on 24 September 2012 and wrapped on 4 July 2013.

Of the series, Melanie Vallejo told Scott Gavin from TV Week, "the show has evolved quite a bit. It's not just about four girls anymore. Each of their four worlds has become bigger and more complicated." Of the return of the third series, Erin Millar from the same publication wrote, "there's plenty of love in the air, but this season won't be all about romance."

Script producer, Dan Bennett confirmed that there are 26 episodes in season three.

== Plot ==
Bec must deal with the painful reality of Matt's death, Frances's sense of security is affected following a terrifying episode, Jenny is adjusting to a new life in the wake of a bombshell secret shaking the Gross family, and Sophie discovers her feelings for Doug re-emerging after she returns from a traumatic trip to Nairobi.

== Cast ==
=== Main ===
- Melissa Bergland as Jenny Gross
- Virginia Gay as Frances James
- Zoe Tuckwell-Smith as Bec Gilbert
- Melanie Vallejo as Sophie Wong
- Katherine Hicks as Sam MacKenzie
- Tom Wren as Doug Graham
- Sibylla Budd as Carla Hughes (13 episodes)
- Damien Bodie as Jonathan Kurtiss (24 episodes)
- Stephen Phillips as Zach Armstrong (22 episodes)
- Mike Smith as Callum Gilbert (12 episodes)
- Tom Hobbs as Flynn Johnson
- Jack Pearson as Patrick Gross (25 episodes)
- Denise Scott as Trish Gross
- Francis Greenslade as Brian Gross
- Sarah Grace as Bridget Fitzpatrick (24 episodes)

=== Recurring ===
- PiaGrace Moon as Jasmine Patterson (20 episodes)
- David Paterson as Ryan Sharrock (13 episodes)
- Paul Moore as Wes Fitzpatrick (11 episodes)
- Anne Phelan as Dot Gross (11 episodes)
- Luke McKenzie as Shannon Taylor (10 episodes)
- Ryan Hayward as Brett Tully (7 episodes)
- Ben Geurens as Adam Grbowski (7 episodes)
- Nell Feeney as Carolyn Gilbert (5 episodes)
- Danielle Horvat as Coco Jones (5 episodes)
- Dieter Brummer as Jason Ross (5 episodes)
- Nick Russell as Gabe Reynolds (4 episodes)
- Davini Malcolm as Anna MacKenzie (3 episodes)
- Amelia Best as Stephanie Hennessey (3 episodes)
- Greg Stone as Steve Gilbert (3 episodes)
- Dan O'Connor as Nate Simpson (3 episodes)

=== Guest ===
- Cassandra Magrath as Cynthia Tengrove (2 episodes)
- Dimitri Baveas as Noah Foley (2 episodes)
- Mahesh Jadu as Evan Madawella (2 episodes)
- Pia Prendiville as Jess Byrnes (2 episodes)
- Zoe Bertram as Jacqui Grbowski (2 episodes)
- Brett Swain as Roy Grbowski (2 episodes)
- Nathin Butler as Luke MacKenzie (2 episodes)
- Nicki Paull as Leanne O'Connor (1 episode)
- Adam Lucas as Jackson Norton (1 episode)
- Fletcher Humphrys as Lincoln Sullivan (1 episode)
- Roger Oakley as Pat O'Keeffe (1 episode)
- Ronald Falk as Ken Ross (1 episode)
- Todd McKenney as Bryce Thomson (1 episode)
- Nick Simpson-Deeks as Rhys Mitchell (1 episode)

==== Casting ====
Blair McDonough did not return due to his character's death in the season two finale. Katherine Hicks was promoted to the main cast as Sam MacKenzie.

== Episodes ==
No. overall	No. in season	Title	Directed by	Written by	Original release date	Australian viewers
Part 1
45	1	"Whys & What Ifs"	Nicholas Bufalo	Trent Roberts	9 July 2013	0.991
The girls attend Matt's funeral. Bec is struggling to cope with the tragedy but is putting on a brave face. Doug has moved in with Bec to help her cope with Matt's death and with baby Harrison, but Bec has become overprotective of him. Jenny's relationship with Callum and her family life appears rock solid, however her long-lost half-sister Sam causes tension between the family. Sophie returns from her trip to Africa a different woman. Frances is still reeling from her near-death experience and the fact that Zach is in Abu Dhabi is not helping.
46	2	"Head in the Sand"	Nicholas Bufalo	Alix Beane	16 July 2013	1.014
After a Skype call with Zach, Frances worries that he might be cheating with his assistant Charlie, even though she is growing close to her self-defence instructor, Shannon. Sophie is pretending to be okay after the accident that happened in Kenya. Bec finally agrees to go to counseling. Patrick continues to be annoyed with Brian's urge to get to know his daughter, but Jenny discovers his guilt stems from Matt's death.
47	3	"Self Defence"	Declan Eames	Nicky Arnall	23 July 2013	1.005
Sophie and Frances get a shock when they discover that Jackson Norton has been released from gaol. Despite her money woes, Jenny is determined to have the wedding of her dreams. Bec immerses herself and lies to her friends even more after Ryan tells her that she needs to take some time to herself. Frances has troubles coming to terms with Jackson's release and accidentally hits Shannon with a beer bottle.
48	4	"When You Least Expect It"	Declan Eames	Dan Bennett	30 July 2013	1.173
Bec finally works through all her grief and scatters Matt's ashes at sea. Acting as the primary carer for Harrison takes a toll when Doug make a very bad first impression with his new boss, Dr. Carla Hughes. Jenny is not happy when she discovers that Callum has been participating in medical trials to earn extra money for the wedding. Zach decides to move back to Australia for good. Frances begins to get closer to Shannon. Callum receives some devastating news. Tiffany tries to get in contact with Matt.
49	5	"In An Instant"	Pino Amenta	Dan Bennett	6 August 2013	1.154
Callum stuns Jenny by calling off the wedding. Shock turns to anger as Jenny demands a proper explanation, but Callum is vague and evasive. Sophie reveals the truth to Bec about Matt's affair with Tiffany. Bec's anger at Sophie is quickly replaced by anger at Matt, but Sophie does not get off so lightly with Doug who declares that her lying has ruined any chance they ever had of getting back together. As she assists Shannon after his assault, Frances remains blissfully unaware that he is developing romantic feelings for her – but not for long.
50	6	"Blame It on the Moon"	Pino Amenta	Trent Roberts	13 August 2013	1.203
The full moon brings out the green-eyed monster as the girls grapple with jealousy issues at Patrick's 21st party. Sophie's still fighting her feelings for Doug so when he invites Carla to Patrick's 21st, she brings her own date to make him jealous. Frances brings Shannon to the party, making Zach jealous. Jackson, the man who held Frances, Jonathan and Sophie hostage the previous year is released from prison and shows up outside the party. He is then bashed to death by Shannon.
51	7	"I Shall Be Released"	Lucas Testro	Kirsty Fisher	20 August 2013	1.153
The pressure builds on Frances as Shannon's committal hearing looms. Sophie struggles with Doug and Carla being a couple. When she lets her frustrations show, it leads Doug to reveal the truth about their past to Carla. Bec's anger about Matt and Tiffany's affair is bubbling away with nowhere to go. Flynn's inept efforts to woo Sam force her to realise she does indeed have feelings for him lurking behind her tough facade. Anxiety simmers at the Gross house in the wake of Mrs Gross' decision to invite Anna to family roast night.
52	8	"Angle of Repose"	Lucas Testro	Nicky Arnall	27 August 2013	1.115
After a patient with a suspected case of swine flu is admitted to the hospital, Sophie and Sam find themselves spending the night in isolation with their respective exes. After a night spent in isolation with Doug, Sophie comes to a realisation of her own. Struggling with Doug's blossoming relationship with Carla, Sophie decides to request a transfer to a different ward. Meanwhile, Bec makes a bold life move when she decides to sell the salon. But things become muddled when she realises that she has no idea what to do with her days.
53	9	"You Can Run..."	Nicholas Bufalo	Alix Beane	3 September 2013	1.144
As Sophie, Sam, Callum, Doug and Carla try to keep their issues secret, they each learn that you can only avoid your problems for so long before the truth comes out...
54	10	"How to Hide a Scar"	Nicholas Bufalo	Trent Roberts	10 September 2013	1.177
Difficult truths are brought to light as new secrets are concealed. Bec throws herself into plans for Harrison and Aalivyah's first birthday party as an avoidance technique for dealing with where Matt should feature in the celebrations. Callum continues to keep his money troubles a secret. To combat his jealousy about Sam, Flynn asks Sophie to join him on a night out. With Zach and Jasmine in her space once more, Frances feels like she's going backwards. Sam's nervous about her date with Brett, and Sophie's inquisition does little to help.
55	11	"Dirty Little Secrets"	Pino Amenta	Emma Gordon	17 September 2013	1.068
All the girls are keeping secrets, but someone's about to find their little white lies are more dangerous than they could possibly have imagined. With a fresh sense of closure, Bec starts a blog about her recent experiences. Jenny throws herself into pre-wedding counselling with gusto but, on a downwards gambling spiral, Callum's less keen to bare his soul to the local priest. Sophie's glamorous fauxmance with Nate starts to lose its lustre when Doug appears to be on to their lack of chemistry.
56	12	"Love's Labours Lost"	Pino Amenta	Art Benjamin, Rene Zandveld & Eloise Healey	24 September 2013	1.245
As his wedding to Jenny gets closer, Callum realises that he needs a loan, and Bec agrees to give it to him, if he tells Jenny the truth. Jenny begins to feel the pressure of her upcoming nuptials. Frances and Zach argue over whether Frances should be going to Shannon's self-defense classes. Sophie breaks up with Nate after a magazine article accuses her of cheating. Bec organises an Alice in Wonderland-themed hens' night for Jenny. Patrick gets arrested at the bucks' night for indecent exposure after a nude run.
57	13	"It's a Nice Day to Start Again"	Jean-Pierre Mignon	Trent Roberts	25 September 2013	1.147
Jenny asks Sam to do a reading at the wedding, and with a bit of help from Flynn, she overcomes her fear of public speaking. After overhearing a remark about his family, Patrick breaks up with Coco and confides in Jasmine. At the altar, Callum delivers a heartfelt speech and together he and Jenny decide to call off the wedding. Sophie opens up and tells Flynn what really happened in Africa. Carla and Doug confirm their love for each other. Frances begins to feel like she is falling out of love with Zach. After a confrontation, Shannon tries to kills Zach and hides him in his boot. Final appearance of Mike Smith as Callum Gilbert
Part 2
58	14	"The Wake–Up Call"	Jean-Pierre Mignon	Pete McTighe	28 January 2014	1.159
Zach is on life support after having emergency brain surgery. After two weeks in America, Jenny returns home scarily euphoric about the prospects of life. After backing her car into him, Bec goes on a date with handsome bikie, Jason. After niggling comments from Jonathan, Frances confronts Shannon about the night of Zach's attack. Sophie tries to set up Flynn and Sam.
59	15	"Slip Sliding Away"	Ian Gilmour	Rene Zandveld	4 February 2014	1.160
Sam realizes that she likes Flynn, and after a tension filled ice skating night, she finally admits her feelings to a sleeping Flynn. Carla becomes increasingly worried after seeing Doug and Sophie sharing two close moments. Bec goes on a date with Jason and they share a kiss. Jasmine and Patrick share an unexpected kiss. During emergency surgery, Zach has a stroke. Frances refuses to turn off the life support, claiming she has faith that Zach will wake up.
60	16	"The Real Me"	Ian Gilmour	Alix Beane	11 February 2014	1.084
Carla reveals to Doug that she has bipolar and he then proposes. Bec is troubled when she discovers that Jason smokes marijuana and finds his crop. Flynn gets Patrick off his obscene exposure charge without a criminal record. Jonathan hires three women to treat Frances. Sophie is devastated to discover Doug and Carla's engagement. Dot and Trish intervene to stop Brian hurting himself when he starts a strenuous exercise regime.
61	17	"Afternoon Delight"	Fiona Banks	Nicky Arnall	18 February 2014	1.201
The friends go out to Sam's farm to reconnect. Sophie tries too hard to be supportive of Doug and Carla. Sam and Flynn find it awkward after their night together and she decides to stay at the farm. Bec feels it is too early to move on and breaks up with Jason. Frances worries that she will become Zach's full-time carer when she does not love him anymore. Jenny ends her drought and has sex with the farmhand. Trish and Brian rediscover their sex life. Patrick and Jasmine grow closer. Zach wakes up from his coma.
62	18	"Selective Reality"	Fiona Banks	Trent Roberts	25 February 2014	1.160
Three weeks have passed and Frances has trouble taking care of Zach when he returns home. Jenny gets back into the dating game and discovers the pitfalls of two-timing when Drew walks in on her kissing the teenaged Noah. Bec has her final session with Ryan, but he later hangs out with Doug at her house. Sophie tries to convince Flynn not to contact Sam. After finally confronting Brett and accusing a patient of abuse, Sam returns. Despite Jonathan's warnings, Frances takes Zach back.
63	19	"Fallout"	Kevin Carlin	Pete McTighe	4 March 2014	1.084
Bec finds out the counsellor at Renwood has been reduced to part-time and she works with Ryan to change this, however he soon becomes uncomfortable when he realises he has feelings for her. Frances has trouble dealing with Zach after he blames her for the accident. Sophie tries to moves on and gets the number of a DJ at a club. Sam and Flynn agree to avoid each other after he hooks up with a bridesmaid at a club. Jenny sends Noah a topless photo and when she breaks up with him, he sends it to a number of people including Jasmine.
64	20	"Time Waits for No One"	Kevin Carlin	Eloise Healey	11 March 2014	1.049
Zach enlists Jonathan to help him when he decides to treat Frances and Jasmine to a croquet match. Jenny's photo comes back to haunt her when it appears on a website and ruins her job interview at Renwood. Bec goes to the school board and Ryan turns up and helps her win. Sophie goes on a date with Evan but after Flynn tries to help her, she gets self-conscious and he dumps her. Sam looks after a young man with lymphoma. Ryan tells Bec about his true feelings. Flynn and Sam grow further apart when he sleeps with another woman.
65	21	"The Right Wrong Choice"	Jet Wilkinson	Rene Zandveld & Eloise Healey	11 March 2014	0.929
Jenny goes back to the call centre she used to work at and tries to flirt with one of her colleagues. Despite Doug's warnings, Bec persists in trying to build a friendship with Ryan. After Zach is told he is not going to get any better, Frances decides to show him a sign of her commitment and they have sex for the first time since the accident. Sophie grows attached to a drug-dependent baby after her mother disappears. Flynn begins to self-destruct and turns up to work hungover and unwashed. Sam continues to grow closer to Adam.
66	22	"You Choose You Lose"	Jet Wilkinson	Emma Gordon	18 March 2014	1.117
Bec and Ryan decide to part ways, but it is not long before they have sex. Sam continues to bond with Adam and is shocked when she discovers that his cancer is terminal. Frances tries to make a commitment to Zach to prove how much she loves him, but he later finds the text that Frances sent to Jonathan. Jenny tries to get Gabe to ask her on a date, but he tells her he has a girlfriend. Patrick gives Jenny some advice that makes her think that Gabe does likes her, despite his girlfriend. Sophie hunts down Jess so she can keep her daughter. Flynn tries to redeem himself with Sam. Doug and Sophie get pulled into a team-bonding exercise.
67	23	"The Forbidden Fruit"	Ian Gilmour	Alix Beane	18 March 2014	1.030
Jenny decides to move on from Gabe knowing she cannot have him. Ryan and Bec face the medical board and after consideration, he decides to quit his job. Jonathan discovers Zach has booked a one-way ticket to Abu Dhabi and after she pleads with him in the airport, Frances is heartbroken when Zach leaves. Sam has trouble letting go of Adam after he collapses and she calls an ambulance against his wishes. Patrick and Jasmine have a last lunch together. Doug and Sophie go to the team-bonding activity and he sees her scar for the first time. They girls come together to help Frances after her break-up. Final appearance of Steven Phillips as Zach Armstrong
68	24	"Coming to Terms"	Ian Gilmour	Rene Zandveld	17 June 2014	1.119
Sam is caught up in a legal battle between Adam and his parents when Adam gives her power of attorney. Ryan and Bec decide to move to Singapore together after he is offered a teaching job. Frances is in Jasmine's bad books when she removes every trace of Zach from their apartment. Sophie tries to sabotage Carla and Doug's relationship and vows to make Doug realise that he should be with her. Jenny makes the decision to move out when Trish and Brian receive an offer on the house. Flynn continues to dig a deeper hole with Sam. Patrick and Jasmine move in together until their departure.
69	25	"All Good Things..."	Kevin Carlin	Trent Roberts	17 June 2014	1.000
Carla and Doug's engagement party turns into a reception when they get married. After Jenny asks Gabe to the engagement party, she decides it is time to quit her job and move on. Sam continues to battle Adam's parents. Flynn goes to court and loses the case, but has an idea that could save Adam from his parents. Bec and Ryan move forward with their plans of leaving, despite second thoughts. Sophie has trouble coming to terms after she is rejected by Doug. Jonathan reassures Sophie someone will turn up on her doorstep. Patrick and Jasmine say goodbye. Final appearance of Jack Pearson as Patrick Gross
70	26	"...Must Come to an End"	Kevin Carlin	Dan Bennett	24 June 2014	1.013
Bec and Ryan attend a farewell party and then begin their new lives together. Carla and Doug decide they want to have a baby together and she stops taking her meds. Sam and Adam get married only hours before he dies in her arms. Flynn confesses his love for Sam and moves to New Zealand indefinitely. Rhys returns and asks Jonathan to move to America with him. Sophie has trouble dealing with her crush on Luke. Gabe tells Jenny that he wants to be with her. Frances is made a partner in the law firm and discovers she is five weeks pregnant. Final appearances of Denise Scott, Damien Bodie and Tom Hobbs as Trish Gross, Jonathan Kurtiss and Flynn Johnson

== DVD release ==
Winners & Losers - The Complete Third Season
Set details	Special features	
26 episodes; 6-disc set; 1.78:1 aspect ratio; English (Dolby Digital 5.1); M (recommended for mature audiences: mature themes, violence, sexual references and coarse language)	Behind the Scenes	
Release Dates
Region 1	Region 2	Region 4
—	—	3 July 2014
