= Winners & Losers season 4 =

Season of television series

Winners & Losers
- Season 4
- No. of episodes: 26

Release
- Original network: Seven Network
- Original release: 1 July 2014 – 8 September 2015

Season chronology
- ← Previous; Season 3 Next → Season 5

The fourth season of the television drama series Winners & Losers will air in two parts on the Seven Network in Australia. Season 4A – comprising 13 episodes – began airing on 1 July 2014 and concluded airing on 23 September 2014, while Season 4B – comprising 13 episodes – began airing on 14 July 2015. Season four began immediately after the conclusion of the third season. Season four follows the lives of Jenny, Bec, Sophie, Frances and Sam two months on from the discovery that Frances is pregnant. Filming for the season began in February 2014 and wrapped in November 2014.

== Production ==
On 19 December 2013, it was announced that Seven had renewed Winners & Losers for a fourth season, set to air in 2014.

Julie McGauran, the head of Drama at Seven stated, "Winners & Losers is a show everyone loves working on. The contemporary vibe allows for great storytelling against a backdrop everyone can relate to. There's so much in store for our favourite girls as we follow them through triumph, tragedy and everything in between."

A fourth season was confirmed on 19 December 2013. A nine-month production commenced in Melbourne in February 2014. The first scripts for season four were delivered on 10 February 2014. The table read for season four was held on 25 February 2014. Filming for the fourth season began on 3 March 2014 and wrapped on 19 November 2014.

TV Week announced that season four, like season three, would be split into two batches of 13 episodes with the first half to air at the end of 2014 and the second half to air at the beginning of 2015.

== Plot ==
This season follows Bec, Sophie, Jenny, Frances, and Sam as they balance their relationships, friendships, careers, and personal goals. As new challenges emerge in these areas, they evaluate their priorities and what they want to achieve.

== Cast ==
=== Main cast ===
- Melissa Bergland as Jenny Gross
- Virginia Gay as Frances James
- Zoe Tuckwell-Smith as Bec Gilbert (7 episodes)
- Melanie Vallejo as Sophie Wong
- Katherine Hicks as Sam MacKenzie
- Tom Wren as Doug Graham
- Sibylla Budd as Carla Hughes
- Francis Greenslade as Brian Gross (25 episodes)
- Denise Scott as Trish Gross (4 episodes)
- Nathin Butler as Luke MacKenzie (25 episodes)
- Nick Russell as Gabe Reynolds
- Laura Gordon as Izzy Hughes (16 episodes)
- Jack Pearson as Patrick Gross (2 episodes)
- Sarah Grace as Bridget Fitzpatrick

=== Recurring cast ===
- Jacob Holt as Cory Baxter (25 episodes)
- Paul Moore as Wes Fitzpatrick (13 episodes)
- Anne Phelan as Dot Gross (13 episodes)
- Laurence Brewer as Jack Macauley (13 episodes)
- Rupert Reid as Rob Hill (9 episodes)
- James Saunders as Pete Reeves (5 episodes)
- Anna Samson as Hayley Baxter (4 episodes)
- Susie Dee as Michelle Reynolds (4 episodes)

=== Guest cast ===
- Glenda Linscott as Lily Patterson (3 episodes)
- Katherine Tonkin as Nicole Jacobs (3 episodes)
- Ben Steel as Aden Thomas (3 episodes)
- Jesse Rosenfeld as Xavier England (3 episodes)
- Dieter Brummer as Jason Ross (2 episodes)
- PiaGrace Moon as Jasmine Patterson (2 episodes)
- Melissa Howard as Cassie Gormley (2 episodes)
- Kevin Kiernan-Molloy as Tyler Dale (2 episodes)
- Nell Feeney as Carolyn Gilbert (1 episode)
- Jessica Gower as Ava Murdoch (1 episode)
- Jeremy Stanford as Derek Watters (1 episode)
- Nicholas Bell as Keith Maxwell (1 episode)

==== Casting ====
Former General Hospital actor, Nathin Butler joined the series as Sam's brother Luke MacKenzie. Melissa Howard appeared in two episodes as Cassie Gormley, the ex-girlfriend of Gabe Reynolds. Former City Homicide actress, Katherine Tonkin was cast as Nicole Jacobs. While Dieter Brummer reprised his role of Jason Ross, the "right-guy wrong-time" ex of Bec Gilbert. Laurence Brewer portrays Jack Macauley, a new doctor at the hospital. Former Stingers actor, James Saunders appeared as "P-Dog" Pete Reeves in August. Laura Gordon joined the series as Carla's sister, Isobel "Izzy" Hughes. Jack Pearson and PiaGrace Moon will reprise their roles of Patrick Gross and Jasmine Patterson, respectively. Former Blue Heelers actor, Rupert Reid will appear as Rob Hill.

== Episodes ==
No. overall	No. in season	Title	Directed by	Written by	Original release date	Australian viewers
Part 1
71	1	"Two Out of Three Ain't Bad"	Pino Amenta	Emma Gordon	1 July 2014	1.097
Frances decides to keep the baby and tells the girls about it. After a failed pregnancy test, Carla and Doug both begin noticing symptoms of her bipolar disorder. Jenny and Gabe's new apartment is not what they make it out to be and Gabe's ex, Cassie, tries to contact him. Bec's seemingly happy life in Singapore is not all it is cracked up to be. Bridget begins working as Frances' personal assistant. Sam finds Adam's ex, Hayley and their son, Cory and delivers them the life insurance cheque. After a drunken game, Sophie and Luke have sex and continue with a "friends with benefits" arrangement.
72	2	"Shadow of a Doubt"	Pino Amenta	Eloise Healey	8 July 2014	1.005
Jenny tells Gabe to meet up with Cassie for closure. Sam learns that Hayley has taken the cheque and gone to Thailand, leaving Cory by himself. Frances has her first ultrasound and is thrown out of her depth when she has to look after Aalivyah. When Doug and Carla visit Singapore, they discover a very lonely Bec. Sophie notices Luke's scar and is shocked to discover that he was stabbed during a hostage situation. Brian has trouble with Trish living in Switzerland. Sam, Luke and Sophie decide to let Cory move into the share house with them.
73	3	"No Woman Is an Island"	Peter Carstairs	Kirsty Fisher	15 July 2014	1.101
Sophie throws Luke a birthday party and admits she is in love with him. Jenny becomes jealous when Cassie and Gabe bond over their dog Barney, however when he is put down, Jenny feels more secure in her relationship. Frances attends a father's group after refusing to go to ante-natal classes. Bec connects with Ava, an ex-pat in Singapore. Doug and Carla benefit from some of the symptoms of her bipolar disorder. Sam discovers she got the nursing unit manager position at the Westmore. Cory and Brian bond when Cory is forced to stay at the Gross house. Luke asks Sophie to be his date to the B&S ball.
74	4	"An Ass of You and Me"	Peter Carstairs	Trent Roberts	22 July 2014	1.044
Bec discovers that Jason is going to court for marijuana possession. Frances refuses to accept Bridget's theory that she is suffering from baby brain. Luke invites Gabe and Jenny to the B&S Ball. When Wes is called in for a job interview, he is forced to leave Aalivyah with Cory. Sam's first day as NUM does not go to plan as Carla steps down as the head of Emergency. Sophie learns that Luke was once married when she unknowingly talks to his ex-wife, Megan. Cory and Sam move in with Brian. Sophie and Luke agree to let Jenny move into Sam's room. Bec and Jason kiss.
75	5	"The Easy Way Out"	Jean-Pierre Mignon	Rene Zandveld	29 July 2014	0.911
Jenny moves into the share house early to help Sophie discontinue her sexual relationship with Luke. After waking up in Jason's bed, Bec admits to Carla that they had sex. Gabe plans a special night for his and Jenny's four-month anniversary. Doug and Carla go on a diet to help them fall pregnant. The new trauma surgeon, Jack Macauley, wins over Doug, Sophie and Sam. Brian talks some sense into Cory when he believes Sam does not want him to live with her anymore. Frances collapses in court and after being rushed to hospital, is forced to have emergency surgery. Bec decides to end her relationship with Ryan.
76	6	"Ctrl-Alt-Delete"	Jean-Pierre Mignon	Emma Gordon	5 August 2014	1.012
Sam suspects that Cory is looking at porn, but when she gets Doug to talk to him, they discover he is trying to find his mum. Frances is asked out on a date by her client, P-Dog Pete, and decides that she will tell Zach about the baby eventually. Jenny learns that Gabe was a bully in high school. Luke is jealous when Sophie and Jack attend a function together, where she is given the opportunity to have her scar removed. Bec breaks up with Ryan and the truth about her affair with Jason causes a rift between her and Jenny. Carla discovers she is pregnant.
77	7	"The New Me"	Pino Amenta	Nicky Arnall	12 August 2014	0.902
Carolyn returns to Renwood and tells Bec that Callum has a drug addiction. Frances begins to feel uncomfortable when Pete suggests that they decide on a couple name. Jenny goes to a dinner with Gabe's family and realises how important his Judaism is to him. Sophie and Jack grow closer after they spend the day together, with what they were doing determined by the flipping of a coin. The Gross family pressure Sam into improving her social life. Carla and Doug bond with Frances and Pete. Bec decides to leave to help get Callum settled. Final appearance of Zoe Tuckwell-Smith as Bec Gilbert
78	8	"Rock and a Hard Place"	Pino Amenta	Eloise Healey	19 August 2014	0.990
Trish informs the Gross family that Deidre has been diagnosed with breast cancer. Sam organises breast checks for all the girls and later, a fundraiser to help find a cure. Jenny has a difficult decision to make when she learns she may have the breast cancer gene. Frances is mortified by the prospect of embarrassment when she learns that Pete's new obsession is with magic tricks. Sophie tries to get time off to go to Vietnam with Jack, but wonders whether she is making the right decision when she grows jealous of Luke's new fling, Brooke. Sam has a one-night stand with plastic surgeon, Xavier. Return appearance of Denise Scott as Trish Gross
79	9	"Who Run the World?"	Ian Gilmour	Alix Beane	26 August 2014	1.003
Jenny learns that she has the breast cancer gene and decides to undergo a double mastectomy. Sam threatens Xavier with a sexual harassment lawsuit if he persists with his discriminatory behaviour against her. With Jack in Vietnam, Sophie tries to avoid the awkwardness between her and Luke. Frances learns that she is having a baby girl and is forced to turn to the internet for parenting tips. Carla's sister Izzy arrives to complete a midwifery course. Doug worries when Harrison comes home from a friend's house in a dress. Bridget organises a dinner to apologise for her behaviour.
80	10	"Terms and Conditions"	Ian Gilmour	Trent Roberts	2 September 2014	0.925
Carla is heartbroken when she suffers a miscarriage. Izzy and Luke grow closer after a day together, and she asks him out on a date. Frances continues to laugh in the face of traditional motherhood as Bridget tries to create a nursery replicated to Frances'. Jenny and Gabe organise a weekend away as she anxiously prepares for her operation. Sophie seeks solace in Luke's arm after comforting Carla. Sam and Doug organise Cory a corporate box at an AFL game for his birthday and are shocked to discover Hayley at their house when they return home.
81	11	"So Long, Farewell"	Fiona Banks	Rene Zandveld	9 September 2014	0.879
The day of Jenny's double mastectomy arrives and causes angst among the ladies. Sam learns that Hayley was a drug addict when she discovers Cory is going back to stay with her. Izzy asks the girls if she can hook up with Luke. Sophie is caught in a love triangle when Jack returns from Vietnam and Luke admits his true feelings. Frances tries to avoid Carla. Jenny undergoes her operation and is worried when Gabe isn't at her bedside when she awakens. Having trouble dealing with the loss of her baby, Carla hits rock bottom and attempts to commit suicide.
82	12	"Same, Same, But Different"	Fiona Banks	Nicky Arnall	16 September 2014	0.966
One month has passed and the girls want everything to be the same, despite the fact they couldn't be more different. Frances treats the ladies to a day at a spa in lieu of a baby shower. Sophie is guilt-ridden after Jack says he loves her and then breaks up with her. Sam pines over Cory's departure and decides to stay on at the Gross house with Brian. Jenny feels that her relationship has deteriorated since her operation and she makes the decision to break up with Gabe. Carla is released from the mental institution and asks Izzy to stay on after Doug tries to distance himself.
83	13	"When You Least Expect It"	Pino Amenta	Eloise Healey	23 September 2014	1.041
While interviewing for a replacement, Frances goes into labour and delivers her daughter, George. Carla and Doug look into adoption and after feeling bad for them, Izzy offers to be a surrogate. Sophie tries to battle her growing romantic feelings for Luke. Sam and Cory are taken hostage by Hayley in a barn, and after she lets them leave, Hayley sets it on fire and dies. Jenny discovers a half-naked Gabe on her doorstep and after a day of bonding, they reconcile. Frances learns Zach has had another stroke and will never recover or know his daughter. After trying to save Hayley from the fire, Luke collapses.
Part 2
84	14	"The Great Unknown"	Pino Amenta	Alix Beane	14 July 2015	0.824
Sam is forced to perform a crichothyrotomy on Luke, with an unsterilised straw, after he stops breathing. Jenny and Gabe decide to move into the share house together, however Jenny begins to have second thoughts. Izzy's offer shocks both Carla and Doug but after some thought, they accept. Frances' pain over Zach is eased when she realises how much she loves their daughter. Bridget reveals that she is falling out of love with Wes. Sam and Brian take Cory into the Gross house and discover his true feelings about his mother's death. Sophie tries to ease the tension within her household as Luke returns from hospital. Luke begins to binge drink.
85	15	"This Is Your Life?"	Jean-Pierre Mignon	Shaun Topp	21 July 2015	0.749
Jenny struggles to understand why Gabe turned down a job promotion until she convinces him to follow his heart. Frances struggles to deal with her limited exposure to George and decides to return to work. Sam's love life takes an unexpected turn when Dot introduces her to Tinder and she goes on a date. Bridget and Wes' marriage continues to crumble when he accepts a job and she refuses to look after Aalivyah permanently. Sophie worries when she learns that Luke has been drinking alone. Izzy feels out of her depth as Carla races through the surrogacy process.
86	16	"The Cold Light of Day"	Jean-Pierre Mignon	Rene Zandveld	28 July 2015	0.786
Izzy informs Carla and Doug that she wants to slow down the surrogacy process, but after her car breaks down, she reconsiders and has the embryos transferred. Gabe is fired but Jenny is worried when he procrastinates by cleaning the apartment. Sam and the girls decide to spy on Tyler at his stripping gig, however after he learns about Cory, he breaks up with Sam. Luke learns that Sophie has told people he has an alcohol problem and decides to leave town indefinitely. Frances runs into trouble when her babysitter quits and she is forced to hire Dot. Brian's anger is curbed when Dot buys him a plane ticket to be with Trish.
87	17	"What You Wish For"	Fiona Banks	Trent Roberts	28 July 2015	0.722
Frances clashes with Dot but after second thoughts, realises the importance of family and contacts her mother. Doug and Carla learn that Izzy is pregnant with their child and are forced to hide the fact, causing Doug to get incredibly drunk while trying to hide the pregnancy. Jenny and Gabe are thrilled when his app idea is accepted, but are later disappointed when the investors back out at the last minute. Sam worries that Cory is being bullied and after a horrendously bad date, she learns that not only is Cory's year advisor her date, but Cory is the bully. Sophie learns that Luke is returning to Melbourne.
88	18	"Intervention"	Fiona Banks	Pete McTighe	4 August 2015	0.744
Carla's overbearing attitude causes tension with Izzy and Doug, but she later has second thoughts and eases up. Frances' day begins with drawing up divorce papers for Bridget and Wes and ends with her mother Lily's reappearance. Jenny begins work at an all-boys school and quickly wins them over with her wit, but her day is jeopardised when she and Rob witness Cory in a fight. Sam and Sophie grow worried about Luke's drinking habits and, after disagreeing over a course of action, stage an impromptu intervention. While arguing with Wes about the divorce papers, Bridget is oblivious when Luke storms out of the house and runs over Aalivyah.
89	19	"Now the Rain Is Gone"	Kevin Carlin	Alix Beane	4 August 2015	0.734
Aalivyah is rushed into surgery. She survives and is placed in an induced coma but later awakens. Sophie is accused of tampering with evidence when Luke's BAL test goes missing, however Carla discovers it was sent to the wrong lab. After a day of bonding at Luna Park, Doug and Izzy almost share a kiss. Jenny is stuck between a rock and a hard place when Cory brings a knife to school and she is forced to tell Sam, against Cory's wishes. Frances refuses to let her mother back into her life until she sees Dot with Aalivyah, causing her to reconsider and offer Lily some quality time with George. Sophie breaks up with Luke.
90	20	"Lean on Me"	Kevin Carlin	Mithila Gupta	11 August 2015	0.781
Sophie continues to worry about Luke despite their break-up, but soon learns he's booked himself into rehab. Jenny becomes the latest victim in Cory's bitter rivalry with his former friend Logan, when Logan accuses her of inappropriately touching him. After a fight with Lily, Frances learns that her late dad George may not be her biological father and she tells Lily to leave her and her daughter alone. Izzy tries to hide her true feelings for Doug, and after a talk with Carla, she decides to move on. Bridget makes a decision to move back in with Wes and try to make her marriage work. Sam begins to develop feelings for Rob.
91	21	"Proof of Identity"	John Hartley	Trent Roberts	11 August 2015	0.745
Jenny's professional standards are called into question when she has to defend herself against allegations of sexual assault, but they are later dropped. Frances and Aden grow competitive, which begins as a friendly competition, and ends in the revelation that someone is suing a doctor at the Westmore. Izzy tries to mask her true feelings for Doug by going on a date with Aden, however it ends in disaster when he learns she's a surrogate. Sophie visits Luke and worries that he might still be in love with his ex-wife Megan. After Jenny is acquitted, Gabe realises how much he loves her and decides to ask her to marry him.
92	22	"Through the Looking Glass"	John Hartley	Nicky Arnall	18 August 2015	0.820
Izzy books a one-way flight to Sydney and before leaving she reveals to Doug that she is in love with him. Frances and Sophie's friendship is tested when the former is revealed to be the plaintiff's lawyer in a malpractice case against Jack. While juggling the lawsuit, Carla is further saddened when she learns the truth about Doug and Izzy from Sophie. After bonding over Cory's basketball game, Sam and Rob give into temptation and kiss in the change-rooms. Luke returns home from rehab and helps Gabe organises a special Alice in Wonderland-themed engagement for Jenny, but the latter is later surprised to learn that she is already wearing the engagement ring.
93	23	"Pride & Prejudice"	Nicholas Bufalo	Pete McTighe	18 August 2015	0.795
Sophie and Frances are duped into working with each other when Jenny realises that there is a rift between the two of them, however another argument over Jack ensues, further crippling the already dire situation. Wes and Bridget forgive Luke for running over Aalivyah. Sam is confused by Rob's hostility towards her after their kiss, until she finally makes him admit that he really does like her. Jenny and Gabe's engagement party brings their families together when they realise that their relatives have more in common than first thought. Carla and Izzy have it out before their ultrasound appointment. Gabe learns that his father had a heart attack and passed away.
94	24	"Unfinished Business"	Nicholas Bufalo	Alix Beane	25 August 2015	0.828
Carla returns from Sydney and she and Doug make the decision to reveal their impending parenthood. The death of Gabe's father takes a toll on both Gabe's professional life when he returns to a call centre, but he and Jenny later decide to bring their wedding forward. Frances fires Dot after she betrays her wishes to try controlled crying with George, and later reveals to Bridget that she is trying to teach her four-month old a life lesson. Sam and Rob reveal their relationship and experience open hostility from Cory. Sophie gets propositioned by Jack and announces that she is leaving Melbourne to return to her clinic in Kenya.
95	25	"Surface Tension Theory"	Bill Hughes	Emma Gordon	1 September 2015	0.739
Jasmine, Patrick and Trish return to Melbourne to help celebrate Jenny and Gabe's upcoming nuptials. The girls attend a bridal expo, which leads Frances to bump into her ex-boyfriend, Pete and they reconcile. Sophie and Luke sleep together, but soon after, decide to end their hot-and-cold relationship for good. Jenny visits Mystic Marg, who tells her that her dream wedding will never happen. Sam and Rob rekindle their relationship and make it official. Carla, Doug and Izzy decide to move back to Sydney for Carla's career. Patrick accepts Gabe into the Gross family when he asks the Gross family to help plan his wedding. Frances and Sophie reconcile. Return appearance of Jack Pearson as Patrick Gross
96	26	"Happy Endings"	Bill Hughes	Dan Bennett	8 September 2015	0.840
Jenny and Gabe are married in a small ceremony, surrounded by friends and family, and are further overjoyed when Gabe sells his app to a company for $1.3million. Patrick and Jasmine's holidaying plans are thrown into chaos when Trish and Brian decide to join them. Frances plucks up the courage to admit her true feelings for Pete, but her happiness soon turns to turmoil when a man named Keith Maxwell arrives, claiming to be her father. Sam and Cory learn that Rob has been offered a principal's job in South Australia and decide to leave Melbourne with him. Sophie's rash decision to move to Africa with Jack is halted when she realises that she's in love with Luke. Doug, Carla and Izzy pack up their belongings, ready to start fresh in Sydney with their newly-kicking baby. Final appearance of Katherine Hicks, Tom Wren, Sibylla Budd, Francis Greenslade, Denise Scott, Laura Gordon and Jack Pearson as Sam MacKenzie, Doug Graham, Carla Hughes, Brian Gross, Trish Gross, Izzy Hughes and Patrick Gross, respectively

== Ratings ==
Episode	Title	Original airdate	Overnight Viewers	Consolidated Viewers	Nightly Rank	Adjusted Rank
1	Two Out of Three Ain't Bad	1 July 2014	0.941	1.097	9	7
2	Shadow of a Doubt	8 July 2014	0.867	1.005	9	7
3	No Woman is an Island	15 July 2014	0.952	1.101	10	8
4	An Ass of You and Me	22 July 2014	0.860	1.044	11	9
5	The Easy Way Out	29 July 2014	0.768	0.911	11	9
6	Ctrl-Alt-Delete	5 August 2014	0.848	1.012	10	8
7	The New Me	12 August 2014	0.725	0.902	11	9
8	Rock and a Hard Place	19 August 2014	0.782	0.991	8	7
9	Who Run the World?	26 August 2014	0.820	1.003	8	6
10	Terms and Conditions	2 September 2014	0.770	0.925	9	8
11	So Long, Farewell	9 September 2014	0.730	0.879	12	8
12	Same, Same, but Different	16 September 2014	0.839	0.966	8	7
13	When You Least Expect It	23 September 2014	0.993	1.041	8	7
14	The Great Unknown	14 July 2015	0.646	0.824	15	11
15	This is Your Life?	21 July 2015	0.589	0.749	17	11
16	The Cold Light of Day	28 July 2015	0.604	0.786	16	9
17	What You Wish For	28 July 2015	0.539	0.722	19	12
18	Intervention	4 August 2015	0.570	0.744	18	11
19	Now the Rain is Gone	4 August 2015	0.574	0.734	17	13
20	Lean on Me	11 August 2015	0.609	0.781	15	10
21	Proof of Identity	11 August 2015	0.587	0.745	17	12
22	Through the Looking Glass	18 August 2015	0.648	0.820	13	10
23	Pride & Prejudice	18 August 2015	0.637	0.795	14	11
24	Unfinished Business	25 August 2015	0.661	0.828	11	9
25	Surface Tension Theory	1 September 2015	0.600	0.739	16	12
26	Happy Endings	8 September 2015	0.713	0.840	13	10

- Figures are OzTAM Data for the 5 City Metro areas.
- Overnight - Live broadcast and recordings viewed the same night.
- Consolidated - Live broadcast and recordings viewed within the following seven days.

== DVD release ==
Winners & Losers - Season 4: Part One
Set details	Special features	
13 episodes; 3-disc set; 1.78:1 aspect ratio; English (Dolby Digital 5.1); M (recommended for mature audiences: mature themes and sexual references)	Behind the Scenes	
Release Dates
Region 1	Region 2	Region 4
—	—	4 December 2014

Winners & Losers - Season 4: Part Two
Set details	Special features	
13 episodes; 3-disc set; 1.78:1 aspect ratio; English (Dolby Digital 5.1); M (recommended for mature audiences: TBA)	Behind the Scenes	
Release Dates
Region 1	Region 2	Region 4
—	—	1 October 2015
