= Frances James (Winners & Losers) =

- Winners & Losers character
- First appearance: "Covert Aggression in Netball" (2011)
- Last appearance: "The Last Five Years"(201
- Created by: Bevan Lee
- Portrayed by: Virginia Gay

In-universe information
- Occupation: Businesswoman; Judge
- Family: Lily Patterson (mother); Jasmine Patterson (half-sister)
- Significant other: Zach Armstrong
- Children: George James (daughter)

Frances James is a fictional character in the Australian Channel Seven drama series Winners & Losers, played by Virginia Gay. Frances made her debut screen appearance in the pilot episode "Covert Aggression in Netball", which was broadcast on 22 March 2011. She is one of the show's four female protagonists alongside Sophie Wong (Melanie Vallejo), Jenny Gross (Melissa Bergland) and Bec Gilbert (Zoe Tuckwell-Smith). The series follows their lives after they win eight million dollars on the Oz Lotto. Frances is portrayed as a smart and savvy businesswoman, yet a "complete social loser" disengaged with emotional relationships. Frances' persona is said to have been modeled on the behaviour of her father following the absence of female influence in her upbringing.

The character's storyline takes her on the journey finding romance with Zach Armstrong (Stephen Phillips), bonding with her long-lost sister Jasmine Patterson (PiaGrace Moon) and maintaining a close friendship with her personal assistant Jonathan Kurtiss (Damien Bodie). The characters go on to create a family unit. Several storylines involve relationship problems with Zach as meddling characters such as Claire Armstrong (Natalie Saleeba) and Shannon Taylor (Luke McKenzie) threaten their happiness. While others include Frances being held at gunpoint, becoming a lawyer and a same-sex tryst with terminally ill Cat Johnson (Peta Sergeant). The character faced more uncertain times following Jonathan, Jasmine and Zach's departures and the discovery she is pregnant with the latter's child.

The character has been favoured by critics such as Debi Enker (The Age) and Michael Idato (The Sydney Morning Herald) who argued that she is one of the show's better written characters. While Idato's colleague's Bridget McManus and Frances Atkinson have praised Gay's acting skills in comparison to the remainder of the cast.

== Creation and casting ==
Bevan Lee created the character with Gay in mind. He had previously worked with her on All Saints. Gay was considering moving to the US to pursue her career, but Lee asked her to wait until she read the part. Gay was attracted to the role because she thought it was "wonderful" to read a script in which the main characters were all female. She viewed the characters as "unusual" and "flawed". Gay told Kate Mead from Stuff.co.nz that "I love that about this show and that it's about how our flaws make you the woman that you are today".

Gay explained to Mead that she quickly bonded with Melanie Vallejo, Melissa Bergland and Zoe Tuckwell-Smith (who play Frances' best friends Sophie Wong, Jenny Gross and Bec Gilbert respectively). She said that they all undertook "a crash course in each other's lives", share meals and wine to get to know each other. By the third day of rehearsals Gay felt as though they did not have to act their friendships out anymore because they had already been formed.

== Character development ==
=== Characterisation ===
"Witnessing pudgy and unhappy Sophie Wong being picked on by school bullies, Frances wasted no time in coming to her defence and thus sealed her high school fate. She gained a formidable friend and study buddy in Sophie. And some formidable enemies intent on making her school years miserable. Later, Bec and Jenny made up the numbers in 'The Losers' group and Frances found herself with a few loyal friends. But that didn't stop the bullies labeling her 'Frank the Lemon,' thanks to her tomboy appearance and lack of feminine qualities."

— A writer from Yahoo!7 explaining Frances' backstory. (2011)

On the official Winners & Losers website Frances is described as a "one of the smartest, most business savvy women you could ever meet". She has double degree in Economics and Law, an MBA from Harvard and "uncommon intelligence". But the character is "a complete social loser and does not know much about the "emotional and social side of life". Frances' mother Lily Patterson (Glenda Linscott) walked out on her when she was seven years old and she "moulded herself entirely" on her father and did not learn "girl" ways. The website's writers add that Frances is a partner in a management consultancy business and works many hours to establish herself in the business world. Frances shares a close friendship with her personal assistant Jonathan Kurtiss (Damien Bodie) and considers him "family". He is "very protective" of her and attempts to set her up with men on a regular basis. But Frances' has a "tough, self-confident exterior" and she feels "silly and out of her depth" when it comes to romance and she has a dislike for the way it makes her behave.

Gay told a reporter from TVNZ that her character is good with "any kind" of business related matters but not with the social world. She added that Frances "swings on a really big pendulum between someone who knows what's going on to someone who is so far behind the game that she's on another pitch." She told a Yahoo!7 reporter that Frances is a "wildly intelligent and high-powered business woman". She spent her life "getting to the top of her game in a man's world, surrounded by men".

Gay told Mead that she could not place Frances in the "winner" or "loser" category because she has traits of both. She has "the most outward expressions of winning" because she has a career, a car and a "beautiful apartment". But Frances is the more "emotionally fragile" out of the four females. She explained her belief that they were all "chronically stuck in the headspace of high school" which serves as a reminder that they are "flawed". In 2013, Gay described her as "very smart at facts and figures but terrible at emotions ... she's very straitlaced."

=== Relationship with Zach Armstrong ===
In one storyline dates Zach Armstrong's (Stephen Phillips) father Paul Armstrong (Geoff Morrell) even though she is attracted to Zach. Gay told Clare Rigden from TV Week that Frances spends time with Zach in a dark setting while they drink wine. In the scenes Frances is having "conflicting impulses" in which she thinks "Hey, let's be intimate...but let me ask you questions about your father." Gay told Yahoo!7's writer that Paul "treats Frances like a lady and I think that's quite a new sensation for her". She finds being taken out "by a man of the world quite beguiling" because she is used to being in control. Frances is "innocent in the face of his worldliness".

Frances and Zach begin a relationship but soon after her sister, Jasmine Patterson (PiaGrace Moon) is forced to move back in with Frances. Gay told Rigden that she did not believe Frances had ever "really anticipated children". She had not enjoyed her own childhood which makes "the idea of having 'teenagehood' thrust upon her again ... [is] her own personal nightmare". While looking after Jasmine, she is trying to make her relationship with Zach work too. Frances also accuses Zach of not stepping into the role of step-father for Jasmine. But their relationship is also strained by Zach's ex-wife Claire Armstrong (Natalie Saleeba) goading Frances. Gay explained that Claire said "that Frances is not a match for Zach physically or sexually". It was an "awful" comment to make as the actress believed that there is not "a thing that you can say to someone that's worse" - which means Frances cannot forget about it. Their relationship faces further problems as Frances decides to concentrate of giving Jasmine her undivided attention. Gay told TV Week's Erin Miller that Frances is just trying to be responsible and take the role Lily could not provide. But Gay believed that her character was doing so at the expense of her relationship with Zach. Claire uses the opportunity to try and steal Zach from Frances.

The duo eventually sort out their relationship problems. But Zach is later offered a job in Abu Dhabi and Frances is forced to decide if she can cope with a long-distance relationship. Gay told Miller that Frances makes a spreadsheet to weigh up the pros and cons. Despite the outcome being negative, Gay added that "she thinks they can be happy individuals on opposite sides of the world from each other." The characters ultimately needed to prove be "spectacularly good at communicating" for it to succeed.

The show decided to create more problematic scenarios for Frances and Zach's relationship during the third season. Frances' self-defense instructor Shannon Taylor (Luke McKenzie) becomes attracted to her. Gay was happy with the development because she enjoys her character most when she is "conflicted and falling out of love". She added that Frances "just doesn't deal well with things". The plot does not involve infidelity with Frances becoming wary of Shannon when he kisses her. He soon makes Frances believe they could remain friends by claiming to have a girlfriend. Gay told a TV Week reporter that Frances believes Shannon realised his mistakes. But Zach orders Frances to cease contact with Shannon; a demand which she takes issue with. Gay explained that "Frances has been an individual all her life. so, this is the first time anybody has laid claim to ask her not to see somebody." Frances plays a pivotal role in the season cliffhanger when Shannon attacks Zach and leaves him for dead following his heightened obsession. Gay said that it is a "very tense [and] very stressful" time on-screen, but equally exciting viewing. She added that her character was "left on a massive cliff". A writer from Prime7 named it the toughest challenge the character faced during her tenure. Zach was written out of the series in 2014. He decides to leave Australia after he believes that Frances no longer loves him. Despite an emotional plea from Frances at an airport Zach still leaves her. A feature compiled by TV Week included the scene in their "Best 5 moments" of the entire show.

=== Friendship with Cat Johnson ===
During the show's second season Frances' befriends Cat Johnson (Peta Sergeant) and the show used her to implement a series of changes to Frances' personality. Though the pair do not get off to a good start when Cat kisses Zach. Sergeant told TV Week's Miller that Sophie informs Cat about the situation between Frances and Zach. Frances is not impressed with Cat. But she does not think about how seducing Zach will make Frances feel. Frances and Cat become close friends and later share a kiss. But Cat is hiding a secret that she is terminally ill. Sergeant told Miller that Cat finds Frances irresistible because she hiding her their true self. She added that "Cat sees that in Frances and sees straight away she isn't living out the life of who she wants to be." Cat believes that Frances has a suppressed mischievous persona and wants to help her to discover it.

The terminally ill character wants to live life to its full potential with Frances. Cat convinces her friend to participate in trapeze classes. Gay explained that the storyline served to take her character outside her comfort zone, noting that she would never normally behave impulsively. She believed that Cat's personality and way of life serves as an inspiration to Frances. The bond with Cat enlightens Frances to the extent that she wants to change her life and tackle new scenarios and challenges. But their friendship soon becomes problematic. Cat tells Frances about her illness by mistake. Sergeant said that her character wanted it to remain secret. But the situation becomes to upsetting and she chooses Frances as her confidant. The burden of Cat's secret proves difficult and she tells Sophie the truth. Gay said that Cat could not control her illness but could decide who knew about it. Cat believes that Frances has taken that control from her. Gay found filming the emotional confrontation scenes difficult due to her own friendship with Sergeant.

Cat throws herself a wake and this leaves Frances in turmoil and she hides away drinking whisky. Unable to cope with the situation Frances pushes her friends away and even distances herself from Jonathan. Gay told Miller that "she's gutted, she's heartbroken for her friend, but also confused and, well, just gutted."

=== Pregnancy ===
Frances learns that she is pregnant following Zach's departure. She decides to not inform him and decides on being a single parent. A writer from Soap World reported that Frances would ignore abdominal pains fearing that Zach will discover the truth. But her ignorance leads to her requiring surgery to save the unborn child's life. It is with this storyline that fellow characters Doug Graham (Tom Wren) and Sophie find out she has lied. They suggest that Frances still loves Zach and fears him knowing about the pregnancy. The writer added that subsequently the character "impulsively" agrees to a date with Pete "P-Dog" Reeves (James Saunders) in the hope that he can distract her from the predicament.

== Reception ==
Debi Enker writing for The Age said that Winners & Losers had a problem of being to broad with the narrative. But she felt that Gay "notably" often managed "to transcend the limitations" as the "socially awkward Frances". The writer later said that Frances has a "self-sabotaging lack of confidence" and that Zach has "the patience of a saint" to put up with her "frequent eruptions of nervy insecurity". Michael Idato from The Sydney Morning Herald said that four actresses had a "palpable chemistry" but Frances and Jenny were "the most fully formed in the writing". He added that Frances is an "over-thinker" and "bright". His colleague Frances Atkinson echoed his views writing that Gay and Bergland were given more opportunity to show off their acting skills. Idato has also branded Frances awkward and bright. He added that Frances being mistaken for a lesbian was one of the series premiere's "sharper moments".

James Joyce of The Newcastle Herald branded the character a "tomboy-turned-corporate high-flyer". Nathanael Cooper from The Courier-Mail labeled Frances "the lost-in-love-and-life lawyer". A writer from NewsMail described her as "bright and business-savvy" and Louise Nunn of The Advertiser observed her as "delightfully repressed". A critic from The Canberra Times believed that Gay had only received good stories to work on during the show's second season. Bridget McManus (The Sydney Morning Herald) said of the episode titled "...Must Come to an End" that "there are some seriously heavy scenes but the only true tearjerker comes from the wonderful Virginia Gay as Frances, facing an unexpected goodbye."
