= Bec Gilbert =

- Winners & Losers character
- First appearance: "Covert Aggression in Netball"; 22 March 2011
- Last appearance: "The New Me"; 12 August 2014
- Created by: Bevan Lee
- Portrayed by: Zoe Tuckwell-Smith

In-universe information
- Occupation: Beauty therapist
- Family: Carolyn Gilbert (mother); Steve Gilbert (father); Callum Gilbert (brother)
- Spouse: Matt O'Connor (2011–12)
- Significant others: Doug Graham; Ryan Sharrock
- Children: Harrison Graham

Rebecca Louise "Bec" Gilbert (previously O'Connor) is a fictional character from the Australian drama series Winners & Losers, played by Zoe Tuckwell-Smith. She made her debut screen appearance in the pilot episode "Covert Aggression in Netball", which was broadcast on the Seven Network on 22 March 2011. Tuckwell-Smith auditioned for the role of Bec. At the callback, she was introduced to Blair McDonough, who was cast as Bec's partner, before she was given the role. Having previously appeared in guest parts, Winners & Losers marks Tuckwell-Smith's major television acting debut. The series revolves around four "losers" who are reunited at their school reunion and then win the Oz Lotto.

Bec was portrayed as being "bright", "rational" and "hard-working". Tuckwell-Smith thought Bec was a typical girl next door, but with a bit more complexity. She liked her character's generosity and how she did not change after winning the Lotto. Reuniting with her friends – Jenny (Melissa Bergland), Frances (Virginia Gay) and Sophie (Melanie Vallejo) – brought out Bec's more playful side. Unlike the other girls, Bec was not given a cruel nickname at school and she knew that if she did not hang out with Jenny, she may have been popular. However, Bec stuck up for Jenny against the bullies from an early age and they remained best friends years after school.

At the start of the first season, Bec had been with McDonough's character, Matt O'Connor, for ten years, and engaged for four. Matt later called off their engagement and Bec had a brief relationship with Doug Graham (Tom Wren). Bec and Matt reunited and married in the season finale episode, which also saw Bec learn that she was pregnant with Doug's baby. Tuckwell-Smith liked that the writers had made Doug the father of Bec's baby, calling it a great opportunity for drama. The actress also enjoyed playing out a pregnancy on-screen for the first time and liked the change it brought out in Bec's personality. Bec spent the majority of the third season dealing with Matt's death and learning that he had an affair. Bec and Tuckwell-Smith have received a mostly positive reception from television critics. Tuckwell-Smith departed the show on 12 August 2014.

== Creation and casting ==
Australian writer Bevan Lee had wanted to create a television drama focusing on a group of women for a number of years before he came up with the idea for Winners & Losers. Lee also created Packed to the Rafters, which focused on family relationships, while Winners and Losers centred on friendships and was aimed at a younger demographic. Lee commented that the show focuses on the "fun and drama of how we all carry the inner loser inside us, no matter how much life makes a winner of us." Winners and Losers revolves around the lives of four women: Bec Gilbert, Jenny Gross (Melissa Bergland), Frances James (Virginia Gay) and Sophie Wong (Melanie Vallejo). The girls were "the losers" in high school, but ten years later, they realise that they are really winners once they renew their friendship at their school reunion and afterwards, win the Oz Lotto.

Actress Zoe Tuckwell-Smith was cast as Bec Gilbert following an audition process. Series producer MaryAnne Carroll stated that it was "crucial" to the show to get four actresses with the right chemistry. At the callback, Tuckwell-Smith met with Blair McDonough, who went on to play Bec's partner Matt O'Connor. Tuckwell-Smith had made several guest appearances on Australian television shows, before being cast in Winners & Losers, which marks her first major television role. Tuckwell-Smith relocated to Melbourne from Sydney for filming. Of the show, Tuckwell-Smith said "I love that it's about friends. It has great pace; the dialogue is witty. It takes you on a journey."

== Development ==
=== Characterisation ===
Describing Bec, a writer for the show's official press pack said "Rebecca Gilbert is the kind of girl you'd want as your best friend. She's fair, rational and considered, with a mischievous sense of humour and a sexy smile that lights up the room." Lorelei Vashti from The Sydney Morning Herald called Bec "bright" and "hard-working", while Tuckwell-Smith thought her character was a typical girl next door only with more substance, complexity and spunk!" She admired Bec's generosity and that she looked out for other people, and added that Bec "has an awareness beyond herself and that's really uplifting to play." Tuckwell-Smith said that Bec was not really affected by winning the Lotto and she did not change who she was just because she became a millionaire. Bec continued to work in her beauty salon and did not want to spend the money on thing she did not need. Tuckwell-Smith thought it was "sweet" and showed that Bec was "a strong character."

=== Friendships ===
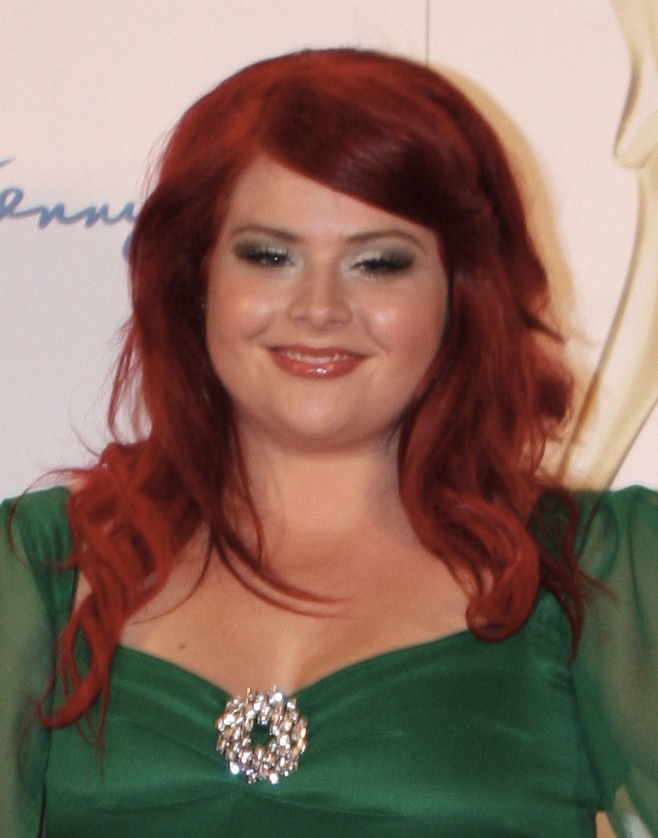
Melissa Bergland plays Bec's best friend, Jenny Gross.

The first episode of Winners & Losers saw Bec, Jenny, Francis and Sophie attend their high school reunion. The girls were "thrown together" in school as they each tried to avoid the attention of the school bully Tiffany Turner (Michala Banas). They attended the reunion to try and prove that they were no longer losers, but rediscovered their friendship when they realised that Tiffany had not changed. Series producer MaryAnne Carroll stated "The heart of the show is the idea of friendship and the relationship you have with friends that you've known for a really long time." Carroll told Michael Idato from The Sydney Morning Herald that there was "something really magical" about Bergland, Gay, Tuckwell-Smith and Vallejo, which no other combination of actresses had. Carroll added that it felt like the actresses had known each other since school.

Tuckwell-Smith said it was good for Bec to reconnect with her friends, as she had been "very safe in her world" with Matt and her business. The girls brought out Bec's playful side and shook things up for her. When asked why Bec and Jenny were friends, Tuckwell-Smith called them "the perfect odd couple" and explained that they were both loyal and had similar values when it came to family and friends. Out of all the girls, Bec was never given a cruel nickname and she knew that if she was not friends with Jenny, then she may have been popular. However, Bec stuck up for Jenny against the bullies from an early age and they remained best friends. Bec can depend on Jenny no matter what, as she is always there for her. The main storyline for the first season revolved around the girls winning the Oz Lotto, which was bought during the reunion night. Lee explained that introducing the "unexpected windfall" not only helped cement the girl's friendships, but also threw them into several conflicts.

=== Family problems ===
When Jenny throws Bec and Matt a party to celebrate them setting a date for the wedding, the gathering developed into "an all-out war" between Bec and her family. Bec's calm demeanour was shaken when her mother, Carolyn (Nell Feeney), told her that Matt was not good enough for her and believed she could do better. Bec then asked her mother to leave the party. Bec's brother, Callum (Mike Smith), then compared his sister to their mother and got into a fight with Matt, which ended with him being punched. Tuckwell-Smith explained "Callum claims Bec is just like their mum and that's why Matt took so long to set the wedding date – because he didn't really want to marry her. Bec's very hurt by that. She wanted to make the whole marriage fun and breezy, but her family's getting in the way."

Bec's family's problems continued when her father, Steve (Greg Stone), introduced Bec and Matt to his much younger fiancee, Brandi (Maya Aleksandra). Bec tried to welcome Brandi into the family by hosting a hen's night for her, but she was shocked when a drunk Brandi kissed Matt. Erin Miller from TV Week commented that it was "a huge slap in the face for Bec", especially as she had been trying her best to accept Brandi. It then left Bec with a hard decision as to whether she should tell her father about the kiss or keep it to herself. Tuckwell-Smith said it gave Bec an idea of how mature Brandi was and her level of commitment to Steve. McDonough told Miller that Steve had a history of gambling and being unreliable, so Brandi did not seem like the type of person who would help keep him on the straight and narrow.

=== Relationships with Matt and Doug ===
When the show began, Bec was engaged to McDonough's character, Matt O'Connor. Matt was branded the "catch" of their neighbourhood while they were growing up. He was a prospective builder, who went to school with Bec's brother Callum (Smith). After dating several girls, Matt finally noticed Bec and they began a relationship. Bec and Matt were together for ten years, and engaged for four at the start of the first season. Tuckwell-Smith found it "effortless" to play a character in a long-term relationship. She thought Bec and Matt made a good couple, saying "they have their share of rough moments but learn from them and grow through them." Bec was devastated when Matt called off their engagement and ended their relationship. When Bec saw Matt with another woman, it "hit home" for her that she had to move on and that Matt had not been joking when Matt told her it was over between them. Tuckwell-Smith commented, "It really hurts her that he can move on so quickly after 10 years together, but it also makes her think, 'Ok, I need to get over this.'"

When Bec decided to get rid of Matt's furniture and repaint the house, her friend Doug Graham (Tom Wren) offered to help out. Of Bec and Doug's initial interactions, Tuckwell-Smith quipped "Doug fulfils that role as a man – someone to help her with stuff in the house – but I think it's in a friendship way." Eventually Bec ended up sharing a flirtatious moment with Doug. They were then interrupted by Matt, who could not hide his jealously. However, this made Bec decide to end things between them once and for all, by handing back her engagement ring and telling him to take his things. This led to Bec and Doug developing feelings for one another and they had a brief relationship. The pairing caused problems for Bec's friendship with Sophie, who had recently had a one-night stand with Doug and rejected the offer of a relationship. Vallejo teased the future of the storyline, saying it would have huge complications for all involved. Bec later reunited with Matt, when they realised they still loved each other, and they married.

=== Pregnancy ===
During her wedding reception, Bec learned she was pregnant and soon realised that Doug was the father of the baby. Tuckwell-Smith stated that there was no doubt, as Bec and Matt did not have sex until after the wedding and were separated for months before hand. Tuckwell-Smith thought Doug being the father of Bec's baby was a great opportunity for drama, and she called the situation "very complex". Things became even more complicated for Bec when Sophie and Doug began dating. Tuckwell-Smith told TV Week's Clare Rigden that it was "a brave situation" for all the characters involved and really showed off Bec's strength. Tuckwell-Smith was pleased to show off that side to Bec during the second season. While the first season focused on Bec and Matt's relationship problems, the second season showed them on a more even level. Tuckwell-Smith explained that Matt was being great about the pregnancy because he was making up for the fact that he caused the problems in their relationship in the first place. Wren commented that Doug was "super-excited" about becoming a father, but wished it was with Sophie. Wren added that it was not an ideal situation for any of the characters to be in.

Tuckwell-Smith enjoyed playing a pregnant character for the first time and liked the change in Bec's personality, saying "It's been great to go from playing the light side of Bec to her turning into a woman and dealing with womanly issues. Bec decided to have a home birth, but things started to go wrong when the midwife was delayed and Doug and Matt were out on a fishing trip. Bec had her friends with her and since Sophie was a trainee doctor, she felt quite good about having a home birth. However, Sophie was not comfortable being the only medically trained person available at the time. Vallejo commented that the situation was quite stressful for everyone, and Sophie was "scared and really reluctant to take charge" even though Bec kept telling her she could do it. Tuckwell-Smith and Vallejo researched the topic and watched footage of home births. Bec's labour took "a worrying turn" when the baby's heart rate began racing, and Sophie was worried about Bec giving birth at home because of a recent accident she had suffered. Bec refused to go to the hospital as she was clear in her beliefs and wanted things to play out as she had imagined them. With the help of her friends, Bec safely delivered a son, Harrison.

=== Widowhood ===
In the season 2 final, Matt died after an acetylene tank exploded and engulfed him in flames. Bec spent the majority of the third season dealing with his death and the fact that he had an affair with Tiffany. Bec later chose to sell her salon and move on with her life. Tuckwell-Smith told Colin Vickery from news.com.au, "Bec has been through the wringer. She has been through all the possible lows that life can throw at you. Losing Matt in such a traumatic way, raising a child pretty much on her own – the only way is up really." Tuckwell-Smith also said Bec was going to go through "a transition" as she headed towards a brighter future. The actress relished the chance to act out the darker storyline, as she believed it added more depth to her character and showed her evolving. Tuckwell-Smith researched people whose loved ones had died and how they coped with their loss for the storyline. She added, "I really enjoyed doing that justice – bringing a voice to some of the darker experiences of life, but also showing a glimmer of light at the end of the tunnel – that people can overcome huge tragedy."

Bec embarked on some "very out-of-character behaviour" when she had a brief relationship with bikie Jason (Dieter Brummer), who also dealt maujana on the side. Bec then began a relationship with her therapist, Ryan Sharrock (David Paterson). After Ryan lost his job, she moved to Singapore with him, after he was offered a new job out there. Bec later cheated on Ryan with Jason, and moved back to Melbourne. On 12 August 2014, Bec departed Winners & Losers. Her exit storyline saw her leave to go and help Callum.

== Reception ==
While reviewing the series, The Sydney Morning Herald's Lorelei Vashti wrote "The only character who seems at all real is Bec, who is so sweet and insipid you actually do believe her dream in life is just to have a nice wedding and a well-behaved hubby." Frances Atkinson from The Age had a similar reaction to the character, saying "Initially, I found Bec way too sweet but she busts out of her floaty, pink persona when her long-term relationship with Matt (Blair McDonough) disintegrates." The Newcastle Herald's James Joyce branded Bec an "unlikely but loyal protector" for Jenny. While The Sydney Morning Herald's Michael Idato called her "bright" and "fun-loving".

Bec and Matt's wedding was named as one of "2011's Best TV Weddings" by a Yahoo! TV writer. They said "After almost 10 years, Winners & Losers couple Bec Gilbert and Matt O'Connor finally tied the knot in a ceremony that reflected their down-to-earth sensibilities. One of the most memorable TV weddings of the year!" Debi Enker for The Age thought Bec was "radiant" in her "great gown", but disliked her "unfortunate hairdo". Amanda Dunn from The Sydney Morning Herald said Tuckwell-Smith was "a standout as Bec."

Reporters for The Age also praised Tuckwell-Smith and Bec, saying "Playing Miss Goody Two-Shoes without becoming boring or repellent is a tough gig, but Zoe Tuckwell-Smith absolutely nails it." The reporters were also impressed by the depth and "sweetness" Tuckwell-Smith brought to the role. Following Matt's death, Dianne Butler, writing for news.com.au, observed that Bec had become a "wan, steely, grieving widow". While TV Week's Sharon Goldstein thought Bec had become lost as a result of Matt's death and her subsequent grieving. She added, "Bec's flighty career aspirations, lack of love interest and softly spoken demeanour mean she's pretty much flying under the radar compared to other characters."
