= Sophie Wong =

- Winners & Losers character
- First appearance: "Covert Aggression in Netball"; 22 March 2011
- Last appearance: "The Last Five Years"; 12 September 2016
- Created by: Bevan Lee
- Portrayed by: Melanie Vallejo

In-universe information
- Occupation: Medical school student Personal trainer
- Family: Charles Wong (father); Louise Wong (mother); Donna Wong (sister)
- Significant others: Leo Chung; Doug Graham; Luke MacKenzie

Sophie Wong is a fictional character in the Australian Channel Seven drama series Winners & Losers, played by Melanie Vallejo. Sophie is one of the show's four female protagonists and made her debut screen appearance in the pilot episode "Covert Aggression in Netball", which was broadcast on 22 March 2011. Vallejo did not undertake much preparation for her audition, opting to be natural to impress the casting staff. Upon receiving the role she moved home from Adelaide to Melbourne for filming. The series focuses on the lives of Sophie, Frances James (Virginia Gay), Jenny Gross (Melissa Bergland) and Bec Gilbert (Zoe Tuckwell-Smith) who attend a school reunion and later win money on the Oz Lotto.

Sophie is characterised as a "self-aware, sexy, confident and hot female" who used to be bullied for being over-weight during high school. Vallejo said that Sophie is likeable because "she is fun, she wears great clothes [and] kisses lots of boys". One early storyline for the character is a cocaine habit, which was deemed "risky" for the network to air. Sophie's problems are attributed to her backstory; once engaged to Leo Chung, she was devastated when he died in a car accident. She was a medical student but left the profession and began working as a personal trainer. Throughout the series Sophie shares a close friendship with Doug Graham (Tom Wren), but he is in love with her. Some of Sophie's "steamy" sexual scenes involve Doug, both Vallejo and Wren thought the plot was "hilarious". At the end of season one the two characters began a relationship, which began Sophie's story arc for the second season of Winners & Losers. Bec discovers that she is pregnant with Doug's child – but the characters decide to try to make their situation work. Sophie also returns to train in medicine.

The reception Sophie has garnered from critics has been mixed. The character's sexual prowess has often been reported on; Clem Bastow from The Vine said that Sophie is "the sex kitten of the show", while Ruth Beloff from The Jerusalem Post branded her "sexy" and "promiscuous". One reviewer felt that Vallejo became a "household face" because of Sophie – and Darren Devlyn and Colin Vickery from the Herald Sun said the critics were "raving" about Vallejo's performance. But The Age's Debi Enker labelled Sophie a "standard" stereotype of the "glamorous, troubled brunette" and Melinda Houston writing for The Sydney Morning Herald left unimpressed with Vallejo's acting, likening her to a "slightly wooden pretty face".

== Creation and casting ==
Vallejo told Belinda Wan from Jetstar Magazine that she did not carry out much preparation before she auditioned for the role. She added "I just made sure I arrived on time, knew my lines and crossed my fingers that they'd like me." She was having a good time in the role and felt that being in the show from the very beginning was "special". Vallejo told Debbie Schipp from the Herald Sun that she auditioned alongside Virginia Gay who went on to play Frances James. Vallejo moved home from Adelaide to Melbourne for the role.

The character and Vallejo's casting, alongside the series itself, were first announced in September 2010. Created by Bevan Lee, the show focuses on the friendship between four females; consisting of Sophie, Frances, Jenny Gross (Melissa Bergland) and Bec Gilbert (Zoe Tuckwell-Smith). The quartet were labelled "losers" while at school and Lee said that it would explore how society carries their "inner loser". Producers wanted the four characters to have chemistry and forced the actresses to spend time together in the early stages of production. Vallejo told Colin Vickery from The Daily Telegraph that it resulted in them "really" connecting and developing real friendships. The show's producer Maryanne Carroll told Michael Idato from The Sydney Morning Herald that it was not her team's intention to cast low profile artists in the lead roles. The "crucial" requirement was to have "four girls with the right chemistry together"; and Carroll felt that there was "something really magical" about the dynamic Vallejo and her co-stars shared.

== Character development ==
=== Characterisation ===
Sophie is described on the show's website as being a self-aware "sexy, confident and hot" female. Although in her backstory she had been overweight and bullied throughout school and gained the nickname "So Wong". She was academically bright and her Chinese father, Charles Wong (Ferdinand Hoang) was strict. She was "miserable and lacked self-esteem" but found safety through her "friendship and close rivalry" with Frances. She finished Dux of the school and went on to study medicine where she found love with Leo Chung. He was killed in an accident and Sophie went on a "downward spiral". Sophie becomes a personal trainer and "spends her time partying and flitting through the world having casual sex with anyone she wants." She also shares a friendship with Doug Graham (Tom Wren) who attempts to bring order to her life – although Sophie "really has no idea who she is anymore".

Vallejo told Wan that Sophie was fun to play because she is "straight-talking, confident, fun-loving and has a wicked sense of humour. She often says what everyone else is thinking but too afraid to say." Vallejo revealed that she could identify with Sophie's "lust for life and sense of loyalty", but not her wild side. The actress also found it "quite easy" to portray Sophie's emotional scenes because she knew the character well. Carroll coordinated a team of "experts" to create the lives of the four protagonists. One aspect focused upon is their accommodation; with each item within signifying something about the characters. Sophie's flat is a "clash of high heels and boxing gloves".

Vallejo told Schipp that it was hard not to like Sophie because "she's fun, she wears great clothes, kisses lots of boys". The wardrobe department dressed Sophie in "tiny little hot pants" made from lycra and midriff tops, which Vallejo believed that no one in real life would wear unless they were sixteen. They also tried to get her Sophie into short hemmed skirts, but the actress got into "tussles" to have them longer. Sophie has an enthusiasm for men and one-night stands. Vallejo explained that she found her character's sex scenes more "fun than raunchy". Sophie often feels awkward about her flings the following morning. Vallejo added that "her enthusiasm for men is OK; it's part fun, part distraction, she hides herself in men. But she also does it because she can, because she used to be a very big girl, so now she's flaunting it."

=== The reunion and friendships ===
Vallejo told a writer from the show's website that Sophie had much insecurity because of the way she used to look. When she goes to her school reunion it causes her insecurities to come "flooding back". The actress told Scott Ellis from The Sun-Herald that Sophie, Frances, Jenny and Bec are not the type of people portrayed on television most of the time. The four are "unashamedly the losers from high school and that's okay" because they are just older but "still just the same friends as they always were". This was something that she felt made them "normal" people. A theme for Winners & Losers is "Can you escape who you are?". Vallejo said that Sophie was a "good example" because her physicality had changed to the point she looks "completely different". She has a new life, but when she is around the girls again – it makes her feel like the same sixteen year old." Vallejo believed that women would easily relate to the girl's behaviour; as she also believed that people do not change as much as they would like to think they have.

Vallejo told Vickery that she felt lucky to play Sophie because she stands out from the rest of the girls from the first episode. She stated that their personalities develop over time, while Sophie immediately has "all these layers" visible. She is also the character who has changed the most since their high school years. An early storyline for Sophie is her cocaine habit. Vickery reported that the show was taking "a big risk" portraying the issue via a lead character because it "could easily alienate viewers". Vallejo admitted that she judged Sophie from the beginning as she questioned why Sophie was acting this way. She added that when viewers first see Sophie, she is "at the height of her craziness".

Following the reunion the girls play the Oz Lotto on a drunken whim and end up winning. Lee told Frances Atkinson from The Age that most people do not keep in touch following reunions, but their lotto win "binds the girls and sets them on a new path". They each have certain aspects of their lives that they are dishonest about and it forces them to confront this. Lee explained that "Sophie's in a lot a pain and just wants to keep dancing on a glass floor".

=== Relationship with Doug Graham ===
Sophie and Doug later sleep together; Wren told Lizzy Lovette of The Sun-Herald that it was "hilarious" to get nude with his "good mate" Vallejo. The pair eventually "got into it" after a period of giggles. Lovette predicted that Sophie and Doug's "super steamy" scenes would boost the show's ratings. Doug later expresses his interest in a relationship with Sophie, but she turns him down. He becomes close to Bec and a romance develops between them. Vallejo told Clare Rigden from TV Week that "down the track, this leads to lots of complications for Sophie. There's a very pivotal moment coming up for her."

"Last season Sophie had a drug habit, lost love, had a stalker and won a million dollars, so it's a different Sophie for sure this season, We get to see her in a relationship, which is very new for her, and watching her and Doug struggle with that is fabulous."

— Vallejo comparing the changes in Sophie from season one and two. (2012)

Sophie and Doug get together but soon after they discover that Bec is pregnant with his child. At first Sophie, Doug, Bec and her husband Matt O'Connor (Blair McDonough) attempt to carry on with their lives as normal. The actress told Debbie Schipp, writing for The Daily Telegraph, that they had an "excruciating" wait to see how Sophie would deal the scenario between production break. Vallejo told Clare Ridgen from TV Week that Sophie would embrace a "new adult mature life" while she is with Doug. She explained that Sophie and Doug share moments "where they're blissfully happy, then there's the baby". None of them actually know what changes the baby will have in their lives and everyone "is being fine" about the situation, but it has an "ominous presence". She even likened the baby to a "tiny little growing elephant [...] in the room". The situation becomes strained and Sophie is the first implode. Vallejo said that up until that point, Sophie had ignored that situation, believing it would not change her relationship with Doug. But Doug tells Sophie that her home is not big enough for a baby, and she begins to think "this is starting to affect me way too much". The actress explained that because the four characters did not discuss it enough, it causes a lot of drama, "especially from Sophie". Sophie has tried to be the "supportive friend" to Bec and ends up feeling left on the outside. Doug and Matt later get into a fight about their predicament, while Bec is "oblivious". Vallejo also branded the concluded that the storyline "may be a little out there, but those tensions are very real".

For Sophie the problems come at a time she is "in a good place" – but they have to act grown up because it is no longer "just about them". In addition Sophie decides to return to study medicine. Vallejo told Schipp that her character feels as though she has "let go of parts of the old Sophie" and taken charge of her life steering it in the direction she wants. As a result, Sophie is left questioning "why did I muck around for so long?" Sophie passes her re-entry exam and starts work at the hospital as a trainee doctor. But Sophie soon becomes bored of menial tasks and wants more. Vallejo told TV Week's Erin Miller that Sophie feels as though "she can put her brain to work" and it "sparks that passion for medicine". She feels like she has waited long enough, she is good at her work but impatient and "keeps trying to skip ahead". The actress did not believe that Sophie is the best student because she thinks that she already "knows it all". Sophie becomes embroiled in a dilemma when a patient has a seizure and she is the only one present. Sophie treats the patient but it draws criticism from her peers. Vallejo felt that Sophie was "brave" and she makes a decision in the moment. She added "I guess [that] makes her well suited to medicine, and she's been in situations where she has had to save the day before." Her actions have bigger ramifications; whenever Sophie lands herself in trouble it deals her "a kick in the guts". She always attempts to do "the right thing and it always backfires".

== Storylines ==
Sophie attends her high school reunion and meets with her old friends Frances, Jenny and Bec. Tiffany Turner (Michala Banas) taunts Sophie because she used to be fat in high school and Sophie takes some cocaine. After a night of clubbing Sophie, Frances and Bec buy a lottery ticket between them and they win eight million dollars. She tells her sister, Donna Wong (Natalie Walker) not to tell their parents and she throws a drug fuelled party. Sophie is arrested for cocaine possession and Frances bails Sophie out because she does not want Doug to know. Sophie's landlord attempts to evict her for not paying the rent – so she decides to buy the apartment instead. Sophie gets drunk at Bec's engagement party and sleeps with Patrick Gross (Jack Pearson).

Sophie's teacher from medical school, Prof Kerry Green (Carmen Duncan) asks for a donation to Westmore Hospital's new cardiothoracic wing, and offers to install a plaque memory of Sophie's late fiancé Leo. She tells Doug that having a plaque will not stop her blaming herself for Leo's death. She decides to donate money and approves the plaque. Doug urges Sophie to open up to her friends about Leo's death. She invites her parent Charles and Louise Wong (Carolyn Bock) around to tell them about her Lotto win. She buys them expensive gifts and Charles assumes that she is a prostitute and they argue. Sophie and Doug sleep together after they question how different their lives would have been if they had remained together. Sophie avoids Doug and when Jenny finds out that she slept with Patrick, she tells Sophie to stop sleeping around and realise that she has Doug. Sophie takes a barman (Shane Fox Neville) home for sex, which hurts Doug, who suggests they keep away from one another.

For her courts case Sophie needs a good character reference and a valid reason to take drugs. She attempts to ask Doug but he is still annoyed at her. Donna tells Sophie that she needs to tell the court about Leo's accidental death, but she refuses. Frances tells Doug that he has to be a character witness. Doug accepts and tells the court that Sophie and Leo were involved in a car accident which killed him. Sophie was left with the prospect of not walking again. Due to the circumstances the Judge (Andrea Swifte) gives Sophie a good behaviour bond and a counselling order. Sophie reveals that she blamed herself because she was the designated driver, but she was drunk and Leo drove instead. Sophie cries and admits that she misses Leo. Doug urges her to confront her issues, but they argue and he confesses his love to her. Sophie returns to the counselling and admits that she is scared of forgetting about Leo. She tells Doug that she does not love him but wants them to remain friends.

Sophie meets JB and they get on, but she decides not to sleep with him and instead opts for a date at the fair. She tells him she wants to take things slow. On their way to tapas with Frances, Doug and Bec are involved in a car accident. Sophie rushes to save Bec and Doug, she helps him to breathe and saves him from the burning vehicle, but he cannot feel his legs. Sophie ignores JB and tells Frances that she loves Doug, but she cannot tell Doug because of his romance with Bec. Sophie ends her relationship with JB, who pretends to be okay with it. She then starts sleeping with Jake Peters (Dan Feuerriegel). She decides to end their fling and he becomes angry and calls her a bitch. Sophie then starts being stalked and she presumes that it is Jake. The stalking campaign becomes more frequent with calls and a fire at her apartment, and JB is later revealed to be her stalker. Doug accepts a job in London, Sophie's friends convince her to go to the airport and confess her love and he decides to stay and be with her. Bec discovers that she is pregnant with Doug's child. Sophie, Doug, Bec and Matt decide to try to make the situation work. Sophie announces that she has been studying in secret in a bid to return to medicine. She is given a work placement at the hospital and clashes with fellow student, Spencer (Matt Levett), who believes she is receiving special treatment. Spencer plants drugs in Sophie's bag, but she spots him taking pills and gets him to confess. Sophie and Doug's friend, Cat Johnson (Peta Sergeant), returns from Kenya and throws a party. She has sex with Frances' ex-boyfriend, Zach (Stephen Phillips), which annoys Sophie who warned her not to. Bec goes into labour and Sophie is left to deliver her Baby Boy who they later name Harrison O'Connor Graham. When Doug Starts to talk about marriage Sophie Freaks out and proposes to Doug herself. After their Engagement party Sophie decides she doesn't want to get married at all, Doug takes this news very hard. They try and work through their issues but When Sophie reveals that she is pregnant and she doesn't plan on keeping the baby, Doug is hurt and devastated. Sophie has an abortion and Doug decides there is nothing keeping them together so they end their relationship. At Matt's funeral Sophie feels guilty knowing about his affair with Tiffany, so confides in Flynn. Sophie decides to move to Kenya indefinitely, to be there while they are building the medical clinic. After 4 months of being in Kenya (cutting her trip short) she returns to Melbourne. Sophie soon moves into a house with Flynn and Jenny's sister Sam. Sophie gets a job at the hospital and her a Doug seem to be working well together and Sophie admits to Flynn that she is still in love with Doug. Things change when Sophie admits to Bec the truth about Matt's affair and Doug shouts at Sophie for being selfish. Bec and Sophie make up and she goes to try and sort things with Doug but he accuses her of always putting herself first and it was a good thing that they broke up. Sophie leaves the hospital heartbroken. At Patrick's 21st Doug brings new boss Carla as his date, so Sophie brings a date to make him feel jealous, but Sophie was the only jealous one. After an outbreak of swine flu at the hospital Doug and Sophie are made to spend the night together in isolation. During the night Sophie has a bad dream and she gets upset when Doug attempts to comfort her. The following day Sophie goes to see Doug and tells him she is going to try and switch to a different department. Doug get angry when he realises its to do with his relationship with Carla, Sophie admits she still loves Doug and can't be anywhere he is.

== Reception ==
Ruth Beloff from The Jerusalem Post branded Sophie a "sexy, promiscuous raven-haired beauty" and Nathanael Cooper of The Courier-Mail wrote that she is a "mega-babe personal trainer". Clem Bastow from The Vine said that Sophie is "the sex kitten of the show"; but would have preferred the role to be attributed to Jenny instead. Darren Devlyn and Colin Vickery from the Herald Sun said that when the show premiered, "the critics were raving about talented" Vallejo – but Tuckwell-Smith was their "standout star". The Herald Sun's Schipp observed Sophie as being "savvy, sexy and straight-talking" with a "voracious appetite for men". A writer from the Daily Mirror chose Sophie's rebuffing of JB's advances in their one to watch feature. Dianne Butler from The Sunday Times wrote that she could not see Sophie and Doug ever getting together. She labelled her "a big drama queen" and said that if Sophie didn't have multiple problems, "she would just make them up". Butler added "love her and everything [...] but she is exhausting to be around."

A writer of the Illawarra Mercury chose Sophie's stalker storyline as a television "highlight". They added that "the adage 'money doesn't buy happiness' has been ringing true for Sophie for a while now", due to her stalker. Lenny Ann Low of The Sydney Morning Herald praised Winners & Losers for filling the four lead roles with females; and added that the actresses were "excellent" and "full of pep". While Michael Idato opined that the four girls have "a palpable chemistry", but Frances and Jenny seemed more "fully formed in the writing" than Sophie and Bec. The Sun-Herald's Jo Casamento opined that the role of "bad girl Sophie" had propelled Vallejo into a "household face".

Columnists from the newspaper The Age have often analysed and written about Sophie. Frances Atkinson said that Sophie is "the fitness instructor who trains men, sleeps with them and forgets them (in that order)." Lorelei Vashti opined that she is "a hot fitness instructor who used to be fat and smart but now she's skinny and thus has heaps of sex." While Bridget McManus stated that the show's "potentially interesting characters" were restricted by "four tired female stereotypes"; with Sophie being "the damned whore". While Debi Enker branded her a "standard" stereotype of the "glamorous, troubled brunette". Her Age colleague Paul Kalina wrote that the "over-sexed Sophie" appeared "determined to not repeat the mistakes of her past" with JB. Jim Schembri said that Sophie's court-ordered counselling provided "the show's dramatic centre of gravity". Holly Richards of The West Australian said that Sophie, Doug, Bec and Matt were "little bit too OK with the awkward situation" of Bec's pregnancy. Melinda Houston from The Sydney Morning Herald thought that Vallejo and Tuckwell-Smith "were slightly wooden pretty faces" during season one and that during season two they were "noticeably more relaxed and able to be".
