= Carla Hughes (Winners & Losers) =

- Winners & Losers character
- First appearance: "When You Least Expect It"; 30 July 2013
- Last appearance: "Happy Endings"; 8 September 2015
- Created by: Dan Bennett
- Portrayed by: Sibylla Budd

In-universe information
- Occupation: Doctor; Head of Emergency Medicine
- Family: Izzy Hughes (sister)
- Spouse: Doug Graham (2014–)

Carla Hughes is a fictional character in the Australian Channel Seven drama series Winners & Losers, played by Sibylla Budd. Carla made her debut screen appearance in the episode "When You Least Expect It", which was broadcast on 30 July 2013 and is one of the show's regular female characters. The character is Budd's first ongoing role in five years. Carla was introduced as a love interest of Doug Graham (Tom Wren). She works as the Head of Emergency Medicine at Westmore Public Hospital. She is characterised as a bubbly over-achiever who is always ready to be challenged professionally. The character has been used to portray topical storylines such as bipolar disorder and miscarriage. After marrying Doug they decide they want a child which requires the character to abstain from taking her medication and Carla becomes pregnant. She later suffers a miscarriage and attempts suicide.

== Development ==
=== Casting ===
On 25 July 2013, it was announced that actress Sibylla Budd had been cast as Carla. She was introduced to serve as a love interested for the already established character Doug Graham (Tom Wren). Clare Rigden (The Sydney Morning Herald) reported that Budd began filming in December 2012 and that it was her first ongoing since being cast in Canal Road.

=== Characterisation ===
Dr Carla Hughes is a smart, sassy and self-assured overachiever who has always followed her dreams and aspirations. She was born and raised in Sydney, but after graduating top of her class and completing ten years of medical rotations at various hospitals, she decided she wanted a challenge – a position where she could make a difference. Taking a huge step out of her comfort zone and knowing no one, Carla relocated to Melbourne, determined to establish a new life for herself. She also hoped to possibly find love – a department in which she’s rarely had luck as work bears the title of being her first priority.

=== Relationship with Doug Graham ===
Carla arrived at Westmore Public Hospital, having been employed as the Head of Emergency Medicine and Doug’s boss. After learning her aunt was horrified at what Carla was doing, Budd stated that she would be interested to see how viewers would react to her character’s relationship with Doug. After being caught taking pills by her love rival, Carla is forced to tell Doug that she has suffered from bipolar disorder since her mid-teens. Fearing that this would tear them apart, Carla is pleasantly surprised when Doug proposes. A writer at Prime7 reported, “[for Carla] meeting Dr Doug Graham changed her bad luck in the romance department and that he respected her both professionally and personally”. They decide to get married but begin to fight over the proceedings. To stop their arguing, Doug and Carla decide to get married at their engagement party. Vallejo told Seanna Cronin at The Toowoomba Chronicle that Sophie becomes a little bit crazy and decides she wants Doug and will do anything to get him, but there is a little part of her that knows that Carla is a really awesome woman and this annoys her. However she is still convinced that her and Doug are meant to be. The actress stated that the storyline was consistent with the real-life situation of realising that you are in love with someone when they have a new partner and also confirmed that it gives closure to the fans of Doug and Sophie.

=== Pregnancy ===
After getting married, Doug and Carla decided that they wanted a child. In order to improve their chances of falling pregnant, she decides to go off her bipolar medicine and prepares to deal with the ramifications. After several failed attempts, a frazzled Carla finally discovers that she is pregnant. After performing an ultrasound on a worried patient, Carla decides to give herself an ultrasound and worries when she cannot find a heartbeat. Sophie walks in and after some initial hesitation, she decides to perform an ultrasound and is devastated to inform Carla that she is unable to detect a heartbeat. Carla later suffers a miscarriage, falls into a downward spiral of emotions and attempts to commit suicide. After a month in a psychiatric hospital, Carla is given the all clear to go home and after a heated discussion with Doug, they decide they will look into adoption and surrogacy.

In August 2014, it was announced that Winners & Losers planned to introduce a sister for Carla. Laura Gordon had been cast as the character named Izzy Hughes.

== Storylines ==
Carla arrives in Melbourne after being employed in the position of Director of Emergency Medicine at Westmore Public Hospital. When she arrives, she does not receive a warm reception from Doug. After he apologises to her, Doug invites Carla to Patrick’s 21st birthday party and they begin dating. After learning that Doug and Sophie were once engaged, Carla begins to grow paranoid that Doug still loves her. When Sophie catches her taking a pill, Carla is forced to tell Doug that she has bipolar disorder and when she believes that their relationship is over, he proposes. Carla organises an engagement party and after her relationship with Doug becomes strained, she considers calling off the engagement. Doug and Carla turn their engagement party into a surprise wedding and get married. After the wedding, Carla and Doug decide to have a child. To improve her chances of falling pregnant, she throws out her lithium pills and prepares for the ramifications. She later develops a close bond with Bec when she relocates from Singapore. She is elated to learn she is expecting a baby and basks in the glory of pregnant life. She later suffers a miscarriage and after falling into a downward spiral of emotions, she attempts to commit suicide.

== Reception ==
Fellow actress, Melanie Vallejo, said "Carla is a really awesome woman, which really annoys Sophie". Sharon Goldstein from TV Week stated that Carla is paranoid that Doug will cheat on her because she has never had a stable love life.
