= Jenny Gross =

- Winners & Losers character
- First appearance: "Covert Aggression in Netball"; 22 March 2011
- Last appearance: "The Last Five Years"; 12 September 2016
- Created by: Bevan Lee
- Portrayed by: Melissa Bergland

In-universe information
- Occupation: Technical support worker Teacher
- Family: Brain Gross (father); Trish Gross (mother); Patrick Gross (brother); Deidre Gross (sister); Bridget Gross (sister); Sam McKenzie (half-sister); Nana Dot (grandmother)
- Spouse: Gabe Reynolds (2015–)
- Significant others: Rhys Mitchell; Callum Gilbert (ex-fiancé); Glenn Young
- Children: 2

Jennifer Elizabeth "Jenny" Reynolds (also Gross) is a fictional character from the Australian drama series Winners & Losers, played by Melissa Bergland. She made her debut screen appearance in the pilot episode "Covert Aggression in Netball", which was broadcast on the Seven Network on 22 March 2011. Bergland successfully auditioned for the role of Jenny after her agent submitted her details to the producers. Bergland's signature red hair and glasses were kept by the producers for her character. Bergland made her television acting debut as Jenny. The series revolves around four "losers" who are reunited at their school reunion and then win the Oz Lotto.

Jenny is portrayed as being bright, opinionated, funny, loyal and daggy. Bergland said that she had some things in common with Jenny, like sticking up for her opinions and her fashion sense. Jenny comes from a large family, who love her unconditionally. They often helped when she was bullied at school, where she received the nickname "Gross-out". Jenny also had a loyal best friend in Bec Gilbert (Zoe Tuckwell-Smith). The show's creator Bevan Lee explained that Jenny's story arc would be about her growing up and maturing.

During the first season, Jenny embarked on a relationship with Rhys Mitchell (Nick Simpson-Deeks), which ended when he revealed he was gay. Bergland named the storyline as one of her favourites. Jenny has also been engaged to Callum Gilbert (Mike Smith), been part of a love triangle and dated an older man. In the third and fourth seasons, she began dating Gabe Reynolds (Nick Russell) and learned that she carried the BRCA1 gene. The character has received a mixed reception from critics. For her portrayal of Jenny, Bergland received the Logie Award for Most Popular New Female Talent and a nomination for Most Outstanding New Talent in 2012.

== Creation and casting ==
Bevan Lee had wanted to create a television drama focusing on a group of women for a number of years before he came up with the idea for Winners & Losers. Lee's also created Packed to the Rafters, which focused on family relationships, while Winners and Losers centred on friendships and was aimed at a younger demographic. Lee commented that the show focuses on the "fun and drama of how we all carry the inner loser inside us, no matter how much life makes a winner of us." Winners and Losers revolves around the lives of four women: Jenny Gross, Bec Gilbert (Zoe Tuckwell-Smith), Frances James (Virginia Gay) and Sophie Wong (Melanie Vallejo). The girls were "the losers" in high school, but ten years later, they realise that they are really winners once they renew their friendship at their school reunion and afterwards, win the Oz Lotto.

When the casting brief was sent out to the talent agencies, Melissa Bergland's agent thought she would be "a good fit" for one of the characters and submitted her details. Bergland was in the final stages of auditions for a production of Hairspray when she was asked to audition for the role of Jenny in Winners & Losers. The brief she received asked her to dress "daggy", so she attended the audition wearing "what looked like an oversized tent and track pants covered in cat hair." Bergland also wore her own glasses and sported her "signature" red hair, which the producers loved and decided to keep for the character. Bergland was contacted a couple of days after the audition and told that she had won the role. Of learning she had the part, the actress commented "It's daunting and overwhelming but fabulously fun at the same time." Bergland made her television acting debut as Jenny.

== Development ==
=== Characterisation ===
Jenny comes from a large family, who love her unconditionally. Her parents, Trish (Denise Scott) and Brian (Francis Greenslade), "would walk over hot coals for her", while her siblings – Deidre (Madeleine West), Bridget (Sarah Grace) and Patrick (Jack Pearson) – are very protective of her. The family's closeness and supportive nature meant that Jenny often lacked "the worldliness of her peers." In addition to her family, Jenny has a loyal best friend in Bec Gilbert. Prior to the reunion, Jenny had never been popular at school and was nicknamed "Gross-out" by the other students. Frequently bullied, Jenny often spent her days hiding in the school library or the toilets. Jenny later used her knowledge of IT to gain a job as a technical support worker after leaving school. Alexa Coetsee from The Sunday Times thought Jenny was "socially awkward" and noted that she had not moved away from the area she had grown up in.

Jenny is portrayed as being "bright, bubbly and lots of fun but deep down a bit of a dag." She has a thick skin and always bounces back from rejection. Describing her character, Bergland stated "She is loud and opinionated. She's really brash and bold, funny and fiercely loyal." She later called Jenny a "fun and effervescent and quite easygoing" character. Speaking to a reporter from The Advertiser, Bergland revealed that she had some similarities with Jenny. She sticks up for her opinions, but unlike Jenny, she knows when to stop and keep things to herself. Bergland also shares a similar style to Jenny and owns several of the dresses she wears during the show. The actress explained that Jenny wears a lot of Route 66 and Hellbunny dresses which are flattering on girls with a fuller figure.

The show's creator Bevan Lee explained that Jenny would initially be quite an immature character. Her bad experiences during high school caused her to "retreat in to life" with her family and Bec because that is where she felt safe. Jenny's character arc throughout the first season was about her growing up and maturing. The money and her friends allowed newer sides to Jenny's personality come through. During the second season, Jenny began to grow up. Bergland revealed "Jenny is falling in love and getting everything she ever wanted… and then ruining her life! She's doing everything in two years that everyone else has done over 10. She's 28 next season, and she's catching up." Jenny realised that she had been "too generous" with her money and should have been saving instead of spending. She also embarked on a career change and went back to university to study teaching. Bergland told a reporter for The Daily Telegraph that she did not relate to Jenny's need to settle down and have a family, as she had "itchy feet" and wanted to travel.

=== Friendships ===
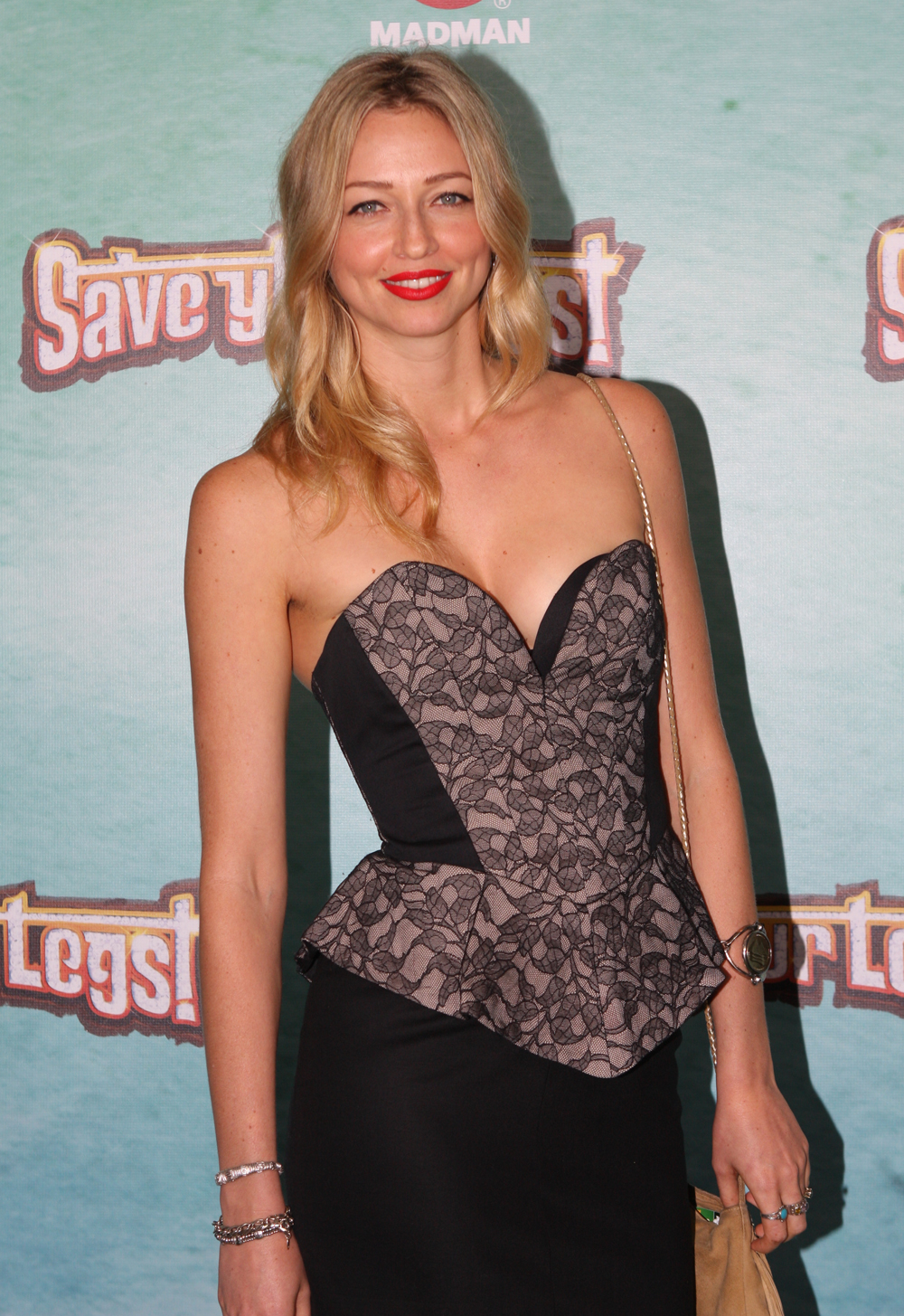
Zoe Tuckwell-Smith plays Jenny's best friend, Bec Gilbert.

The first episode of Winners & Losers saw the four protagonists or "losers" – Jenny, Bec, Francis and Sophie – attend their high school reunion. The girls were "thrown together" in school as they each tried to avoid the attention of the school bitch Tiffany Turner (Michala Banas). Attending the reunion to try and prove that they are no longer losers, the girls rediscovered their friendship and realised that Tiffany had not changed. Series producer MaryAnne Carroll stated "The heart of the show is the idea of friendship and the relationship you have with friends that you've known for a really long time. There is a different comfort level there than there is with friends you've made more recently in your life. There's the idea that you can be yourself with those people because they truly know you."

Carroll told Michael Idato from The Sydney Morning Herald that once the audition process began, they realised that they had to get four girls with the right chemistry together. The producer thought there was "something really magical" about Bergland, Gay, Tuckwell-Smith and Vallejo, which no other combination of actresses had. Carroll added "It feels like they've known each other since high school." The main storyline for the first season revolved around the girls winning the Oz Lotto, which was bought during the reunion night. Lee explained that introducing the "unexpected windfall" not only helped cement the girl's friendships, but also threw them into several conflicts. Lee added "Winning the money binds the girls and sets them on a new path. It also makes them confront the lies they tell themselves."

During the second season, Jenny returned to university to study teaching. The experience forced her to recall the feelings of isolation that she went through in high school. Even though she had attended university before, Jenny did not really talk to anyone and thought she would go through the same thing the second time around. Bergland commented "She figures that now Bec's married and going to have a baby, she needs to start expanding her horizons rather than clinging on to her few friends." Erin Miller from TV Week wrote that it is Sophie, who gives Jenny the courage to face the other students. Sophie is going through a similar situation as she is back at medical school. Sophie made Jenny realise that she does not need to be scared and the advice worked when Jenny met a "cool new group of people."

=== Relationships ===
==== Rhys Mitchell ====
During the first season, Jenny embarked on a relationship with Rhys Mitchell (Nick Simpson-Deeks). As the relationship advanced, Jenny lost her virginity to Rhys and he introduced her to his parents. Bergland told TV Week's Clare Rigden that after having lunch with Rhys's parents, who seemed to really like her, Jenny believed everything was great. So, when Rhys abruptly ended the relationship, stating that his parents did not approve of her upbringing, Jenny was shocked and felt like everything she ever felt about herself had been confirmed by Rhys's parents not liking her. Rhys later told Jenny that he had lied and admitted that he ended the relationship because he was gay. During a live web chat with the show's fans, Bergland stated that the Jenny/Rhys relationship was one of her favourite storylines from the first season.

==== Callum Gilbert ====
Towards the end of season one, Jenny developed feelings for Bec's older brother Callum (Mike Smith) and they eventually began dating in the second season. Bergland thought that Jenny and Callum had secretly loved each other all along. She commented "Her getting together with Callum is all a part of Jenny growing up. She thinks she's maybe ready to explore something with someone she hasn't considered before. He's not gay, and he's not a user – so thumbs up!" Jenny became involved in a love triangle when she met Lachie Clarke (Luke Arnold) at university. Jenny became the manager of Lachie's band and helped get them a meeting with a record label. Jenny's grandmother, Dot (Anne Phelan), told her that Lachie liked her, but Jenny assured Dot that they were just friends. However. Lachie later admitted he had feelings for Jenny and they kissed. Of the moment, the actress explained "When the kiss happens, Jenny's surprised and shocked and doesn't know how to react. She's in a very loving relationship and [cheating] isn't where her head's at." Bergland believed that Jenny was attracted to Lachie's reckless side, which she found "intoxicating". Jenny felt guilty about the kiss when Callum told her he loved her.

Jenny found herself in a difficult situation following the kiss with Lachie. She began developing feelings for him, while Callum told her he loved her for the first time. Jenny went to a psychic to get some advice and she was told that she was not with the person she was meant to be with. Bergland said that this made Jenny think that maybe she should be with Lachie. After attending one of Lachie's gigs, Jenny delayed returning home to Callum and she had sex with Lachie. Jenny later admitted her infidelity to Callum and he ended their relationship, before leaving town. Following his return, Callum proposed to Jenny for a second time and she accepted. Bergland said that Jenny was really happy with the engagement being back on, as it meant she could plan a wedding and move out of her parents' house. The actress added "She's really excited because it took her a long time to find what she wanted. She wants everything that Bec has – she's going to get married and have babies."

At the beginning of season three, Jenny and Callum's relationship appeared to be going well. Bergland told TV Week's Gavin Scott, "She thinks they're on the straight and narrow from here on in, but like every relationship, they'll have their ups and downs." As the wedding costs mounted up, Callum came under financial pressure and began undergoing medical experiments to raise money. He decided not to tell Jenny and Bergland stated that as their wedding approached, a frustration grew between the couple as Callum kept things from Jenny. After Jenny convinced Callum to stop the medical experiments, he soon discovered that he was infertile. Deciding to keep this from Jenny, he told her he did not love her anymore and called off the wedding. When Callum eventually told Jenny about his infertility, she accepted it and the wedding was back on. Unbeknownst to Jenny, Callum had also been gambling to pay for the wedding and in a final all-or-nothing bet, he lost everything. When Jenny learned the truth, she decided to proceed with the wedding, but at the altar, Callum told Jenny that he wanted her to reach her full potential – and she could not do that with him. They mutually decided to call off the wedding, end their relationship and part as friends.

==== Glenn Young ====
Following the end of her engagement to Callum, Jenny briefly dated Glenn Young (Brett Cousins). Jenny met Glenn when she took his bullied daughter, Tilly (Lara Robinson), under her wing. She had to call him in to discuss the matter and Glenn was "immediately impressed" by Jenny's effort with his daughter. Glenn and Jenny later ran into each other at a restaurant and Jenny invited him and Tilly to join her family for dinner. Bergland explained that Glenn found Jenny refreshing and he enjoyed her company. She continued "They have a lot in common and they care a lot about Tilly. The more they talk, the more Glenn seems really easygoing and she feels into him." Having been set up on dates with two men she was not impressed with, Jenny found being with Glenn more natural.

Miller thought that Jenny took a big step forward in getting over Callum. While her parents approved of Glenn, Jenny's brother, Patrick, did not like him and thought he was too old for her. Patrick's fears about Glenn were proved right when he witnessed Glenn snap. Glenn became protective of Jenny and jealous when she spoke to other men. Bergland commented that Glenn was "hurting" and not over his last relationship, like Jenny. Bergland added that her character just wanted to help Glenn and Tilly. She had trouble resolving her issues with Callum, so she tried to resolve their problems instead.

==== Gabe Reynolds ====
Gabe Reynolds, played by Nick Russell, was introduced as a love interest for Jenny in the third season. Jenny met Gabe after she returned to work in the call centre. Before Jenny and Gabe could begin a relationship, they had to deal with the fact that Gabe had a girlfriend. Russell called his character a geek and said he helped take the edge off Jenny's extreme reactions to things. He added, "Sometimes Jenny has a tendency to think the world's caving in around her because of one small thing that's happened to her. Gabe's the sort of person who says, 'It's not that bad, lets keep it in perspective.' It makes Jenny a lot less stressed, makes the world a lot more fun for her."

=== Cancer scare ===
"Things like failed relationships suck and they're part of life. But when it becomes about your health and the future is uncertain, that puts a whole new perspective on everything. When the mortality card is on the table, people can behave very differently."

— Bergland speaking to The Sydney Morning Herald's Amy Cooper about the plot. (2014)

Towards the end of the fourth season, Jenny learned that she carried the BRCA1 gene, meaning she was at greater risk of getting breast cancer. The storyline began after Jenny learned that her elder sister, Deidre, had breast cancer. Deidre's diagnosis also brought up bad memories of Trish's own fight with cancer and Bergland said that it caused the Gross family to realise that there was a pattern, and it could affect Jenny. She commented, "I think initially they were hoping that Trish developing breast cancer was kind of a one-off and they were very lucky but then the big C-bomb really rears its ugly head again." While Jenny dealt with the situation in a positive way, her sister Bridget found it hard and began focusing on the negatives. Bergland pointed out that girls' different reactions showed that there was right or wrong way to react to the news.

Jenny gathered advice from her friends, before making an appointment for a breast check-up. She and Bridget then underwent genetic testing to discover their own risk of developing cancer. Bergland hoped the storyline would get people talking about the issue and realise that it does not just affect older women. When she was first given the storyline, Bergland immediately thought about the death of her own father from cancer, but did want to draw on that experience too much, as she believed each cancer battle was different. Bergland later said that she had decided to look at the situation from Jenny's perspective, and no one else. She explained "The beauty of scripts is that they’re not real. Even though they deal with real issues that happen to real people, every experience of illness is different, so it's hard to compare to anything real life. At the end of the day I just hope to tell the story with honesty and integrity." After learning that she had the BRCA1 gene, Jenny was left with the decision about whether or not to take preventative measures.

== Reception ==
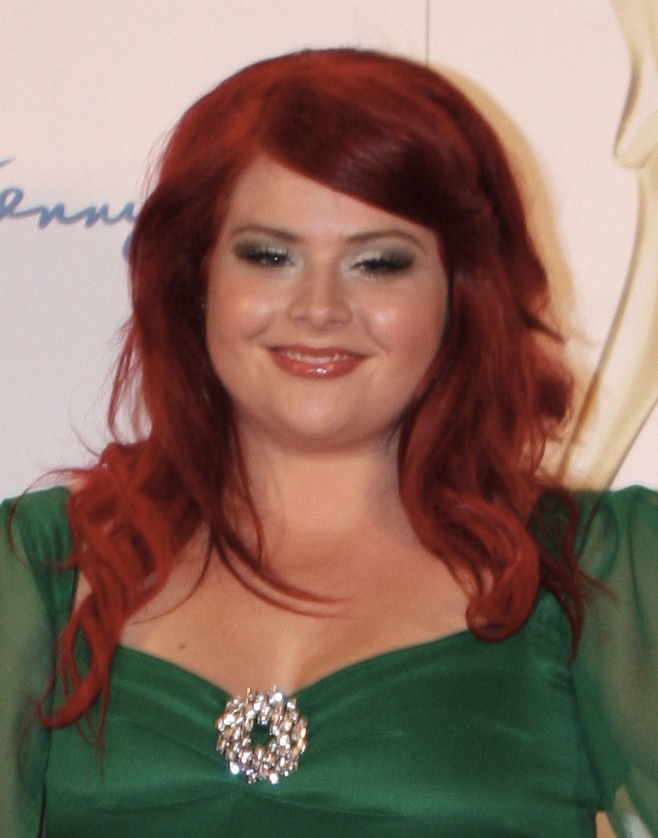
Bergland won a Logie Award for her portrayal of Jenny.

For her portrayal of Jenny, Bergland won the Most Popular New Female Talent Logie Award in 2012. She also garnered a nomination for Most Outstanding New Talent. While critiquing the first season, Lorelei Vashti from The Age branded Jenny "a whiny fat girl who lives at home with her parents." She went on to say "if only the writers would let us under the surface of Jenny's character, we'd be more capable of sympathising. Instead, her personality has been watered down and she spends most of the time whining, being annoying and cuddling an oversized teddy bear." Vashti's colleague Paul Kalina likened Jenny to a "comforting and reassuring" log fire. Michael Idato from The Sydney Morning Herald observed that the "almost pathetic" Jenny was one of the more fully formed characters, while a Canberra Times reporter named her the "most complex character" of the four protagonists.

Clem Bastow from The Vine praised Bergland, saying that she does her best with the material she is given as Jenny. However, Bastow bemoaned the fact that Jenny appeared to "play into every stereotype" the writers could think of. Bastow explained "Yes, Jenny is big – and, it follows in TV logic, she's also nervy, suffers from a lack of confidence, sleeps with a teddy bear, has a dead-end job, is single, and lives at home. The other 'losers' on the show escaped their teenaged hell of being 'dumpy' (read: fat) and became 'successful'; Jenny stayed fat and kept on losing. Because fat people are losers! Amirite?! The thing is, it didn't have to be this way." Bastow hoped things would get better for Jenny and for Bergland. The Age's Debi Enker was thankful that Jenny had become "a bit less needy and hysterical" in the second season.

Dianne Butler of the Herald Sun praised the character's singing at Matt's funeral, writing "what a cracker job of 'Amazing Grace' Jen does". Ben Pobjie, writing for the Brisbane Times observed that Jenny had "a doughtily down-to-earth spirit that epitomises the grounded nature that is W&L's most addictive element". Pobjie praised Jenny's mastectomy storyline and said Bergland shined as she portrayed Jenny in a situation that some viewers would find familiar.
