= Doug Graham (Winners & Losers) =

- Winners & Losers character
- First appearance: "Covert Aggression in Netball"; 22 March 2011
- Last appearance: "Happy Endings"; 8 September 2015
- Created by: Bevan Lee
- Portrayed by: Tom Wren

In-universe information
- Occupation: Doctor; Emergency Medicine Registrar
- Spouse: Carla Hughes (2014–)
- Significant others: Sophie Wong; Bec Gilbert
- Children: Harrison Graham

Doug Graham is a fictional character in the Australian Channel Seven drama series Winners & Losers, played by Tom Wren. Doug made his debut screen appearance in the pilot episode "Covert Aggression in Netball", which was broadcast on 22 March 2011. Doug is one of the show's regular male characters. Wren was cast in the show after only working as a guest artist on other shows. Actor Stephen Phillips also auditioned for the role but he was cast as Doug's friend Zach Armstrong. Doug works a registrar at a local hospital. He is characterised as a caring and patient individual with a high sense of morality. He shares a close on-screen friendship with Sophie Wong (Melanie Vallejo). But Doug is also in love with her. Their "will they, won't they?" story arc has spanned throughout the character's tenure. Though Doug also has relationships with Bec Gilbert (Zoe Tuckwell-Smith) and Carla Hughes (Sibylla Budd).

Doug has been centric to a number of the shows pregnancy storylines. His encounter with Bec results in her giving birth to his son Harrison Graham. It proved complicated and occurred while he was in a relationship with Sophie. The latter also becomes pregnant but has an abortion. While Carla becomes pregnant and suffers a miscarriage. Doug has also been involved in a topical storyline involving Cat Johnson's (Peta Sergeant) euthanasia. The show concluded Doug romantic involvement with Sophie when he chooses to marry Carla. Wren believed that his character had not been fully developed during season one. But the following season saw Doug being explored to a greater extent. Wren believed his character had become "fully flesher-out".

The actor gained a "Most Popular New Talent" Logie Awards nomination for his portrayal. Guy David (The Newcastle Herald) believed the character was sidelined by other characters. While his colleague branded him the show's "resident nice guy". An Illawarra Mercury writer believed that Doug's serious car accident marked Winners & Losers' transition into "darker territory".

== Development ==
=== Casting ===
Actor Tom Wren had only appeared in guest roles prior to joining Winners & Losers. Wren's management publicised his casting prior to the season premiere, stating that he was a regular cast member. Actor Stephen Phillips also auditioned for the role but the casting department thought he was ideal to play fellow regular character Zach Armstrong.

=== Characterisation ===
"Doug Graham, a registrar, specialising in Emergency Medicine, genuinely cares about the lives of the patients in his hands. He's cool in a crisis, calm under fire and completely dependable. He is not so calm when it comes to his best friend Sophie."

— A writer from Yahoo!7 on Doug. (2011)

Doug had a difficult childhood because his parents died in a house fire when he was five years old. He was raised by his grandmother and the healing process formed him into the adult character portrayed on-screen. Wren stated that Doug is a "fairly low-key dude who works in a high pressured environment. So in his social life and his interactions with everyone else he's very relaxed and he is loyal to a fault." Doug is played as the show's "resident nice guy". He is characterised as a patient and caring individual. Sometimes he reaches a point where he dislikes these traits. Wren views his character as "way more patient and forgiving" than he could ever be. Wren has stated that he likes Doug's high moral code. He added that we wished Doug would have more fun and "let his hair down a little more often."

Wren told Jo Casamento that his character has been a "handbag" in season one. He believed that male characters played supporting roles to the main female cast. But he revealed that during the show's second season his character would be explored in more detail and become fully "fleshed out". The changes occurred through his partnership with Sophie. Wren enjoyed filming the second season more. He had been given more material and believed his character to be better structured. Wren explained that with Doug and Sophie cohabiting there was more to their dynamic than "Doug throwing these unrequited I love you glances Sophie's way. It's more enjoyable having a tiff now and then." He observed as Doug as spending the entire first season "waving the flag for nice guys worldwide". Wren branded it a transition resulting in Doug becoming a more normal type of guy.

=== Sophie Wong & Bec Gilbert ===
"It was never going to be an easy situation - she's having her ex's baby, he's now dating her best friend, and her hubby has to pretend everything's rosy. But this week the charade is over.."

— TV Week's Clare Ridgen on the "unusual" storyline. (2012)

Doug shares a romantic backstory with the character Sophie Wong (Melanie Vallejo). An official show press release described how the character was never destined to be Sophie final lover. But he decided to remain close friends with her and support her while being her "covert admirer". He makes sure that he is there to look after her and often has to sort out her problems. But Doug does not put his life on hold and continues to date other women despite hoping that Sophie will reciprocate his love. Sophie and Doug later have casual sex; Wren told Lizzy Lovette of The Sun-Herald that it was "hilarious" getting naked with his friend Vallejo. The pair eventually "got into it" after a period of scene disruptive laughter. Lovette wrote of her prediction that the duo's "super steamy" scenes would boost the show's ratings. Doug asks Sophie to begin a relationship with him following the tryst. But she rejects his offer wanting to remain friends.

Doug grows close to Sophie's newly single friend Bec Gilbert (Zoe Tuckwell-Smith). He and Bec are involved in serious car accident. The event leaves Sophie with bad memories of being widowed and leads her to question her feelings for Doug. Bec herself realises that she likes Doug. The actress told Clare Rigden from TV Week that Bec is upset that her ex-fiancé Matt O'Connor (Blair McDonough) has moved on so quickly and this makes her realises that she needs to do the same. Bec needs help around the house and Tuckwell-Smith believed that Doug assumes that role but at which stage they only share friendship. Their situation becomes awkward when Matt walks in on the duo sharing a flirtatious moment. His disapproval is met with an angry reaction from Bec. Ridgen said that with Matt now cut out of Bec's life completely, Doug was free to take his place. Rigden added that the relationship would cause issues between good friends Bec and Sophie. When she sees Bec with Doug she becomes jealous and may rethink her stance on being with Doug. His relationship with Bec is short-lived and she marries Matt. Tuckwell-Smith told Darren Devyln (The Daily Telegraph) that "it was very clear the relationship with Doug was going nowhere." In the first season finale Doug prepares to leave for work in London. But Sophie declares her love and they begin a relationship. Vallejo said "she got the guy and now has to sort out what's next?"

The season finale also featured the discovery that Bec is pregnant with Doug's baby. Vallejo told Debbie Schipp of The Daily Telegraph, that the cast had an "excruciating" wait to see how the characters would react to the news. An official season two press release also teased whether Doug and Sophie's relationship could survive beyond the news. Upon its return it was revealed that Doug, Bec, Sophie and Matt decide to make the most of their predicament. Vallejo told Rigden that Doug and Sophie share moments of blissful happiness but there is always the issue of Bec's baby in the background. She likened the baby to a "tiny little growing elephant ... in the room". Wren added that "it's made for a very modern-day scenario". Tuckwell-Smith added that Bec assumes the role of the pacifist. She constantly attempts to keep the peace ensuring that both Doug and Matt are okay.

Ridgen later reported that Bec's carefully constructed plan would come "crashing down in spectacular fashion". All four involved actors spoke of dramatic consequences that occur from the tangled story arc. Initial problems arise when Doug accompanies Bec to an antenatal class. Sophie and Matt walk in on the two sharing an intimate moment. Wren said that it causes concern for them and noted Matt was beginning to hate Doug for invading his life. More anguish is created as Doug asks Sophie to move away when the baby is born. He tells her that her flat is not big enough to home a child. Vallejo told Rigden that the scenes aggravate Sophie. She begins to realise that Doug and Bec's child is negatively affecting her own life. The actress concluded that "there's a lot that hasn't been said which is where a lot of the drama comes from." Wren agreed with his co-star, evaluating that three months of tension from trying to behave responsible result in a "total blowout". Doug and Matt have a physical fight following Doug feeling his baby kick. Wren said that Doug and Matt are two different characterised males and the situation riles Matt. McDonough said that Matt believes Doug has invaded his territory by feeling Bec's stomach and "everything spills over into anger". Wren also believed that Doug has issues of snobbery. He views Matt as childish and is annoyed he will help bring up his child. Wren added "Doug thinks Matt isn't equipped to deal with it perhaps as well as he would." Wren later admitted that he did not think writers would let Bec keep the baby because he thought the story would be too complicated.

=== Abortion & euthanasia ===
Doug's relationship with Sophie also helped develop her character. Vallejo stated that "we get to see her in a relationship, which is very new for her, and watching her and Doug struggle with that is fabulous." Following the birth of Doug and Bec's child, Harrison Graham, Sophie repairs her friendship with Bec. Sophie confides in Bec that she is pregnant with Doug's child but considering an abortion. Bec urges Sophie to tell Doug the truth. Vallejo told Erin Miller (TV Week) that Sophie truly believes that concealing her pregnancy will save Doug pain. But the couple's relationship becomes problematic and Doug suggests counseling. Vallejo stated that "he really wants the relationship to work and he's very wise going down that road." But while seeking counseling Sophie reveals her pregnancy and he is "furious". She described it as a "complicated situation and he's really hurt". But Sophie adds to Doug's pain by revealing her intentions of a termination. The storyline was issue led exploring the rights of the mother and father. Vallejo believed it was an important subject for Winners & Losers to tackle. She branded it a "sticky situation" for any couple because both have rights to the child. While it Sophie's body, "there's a whole range of emotions the father would feel to."

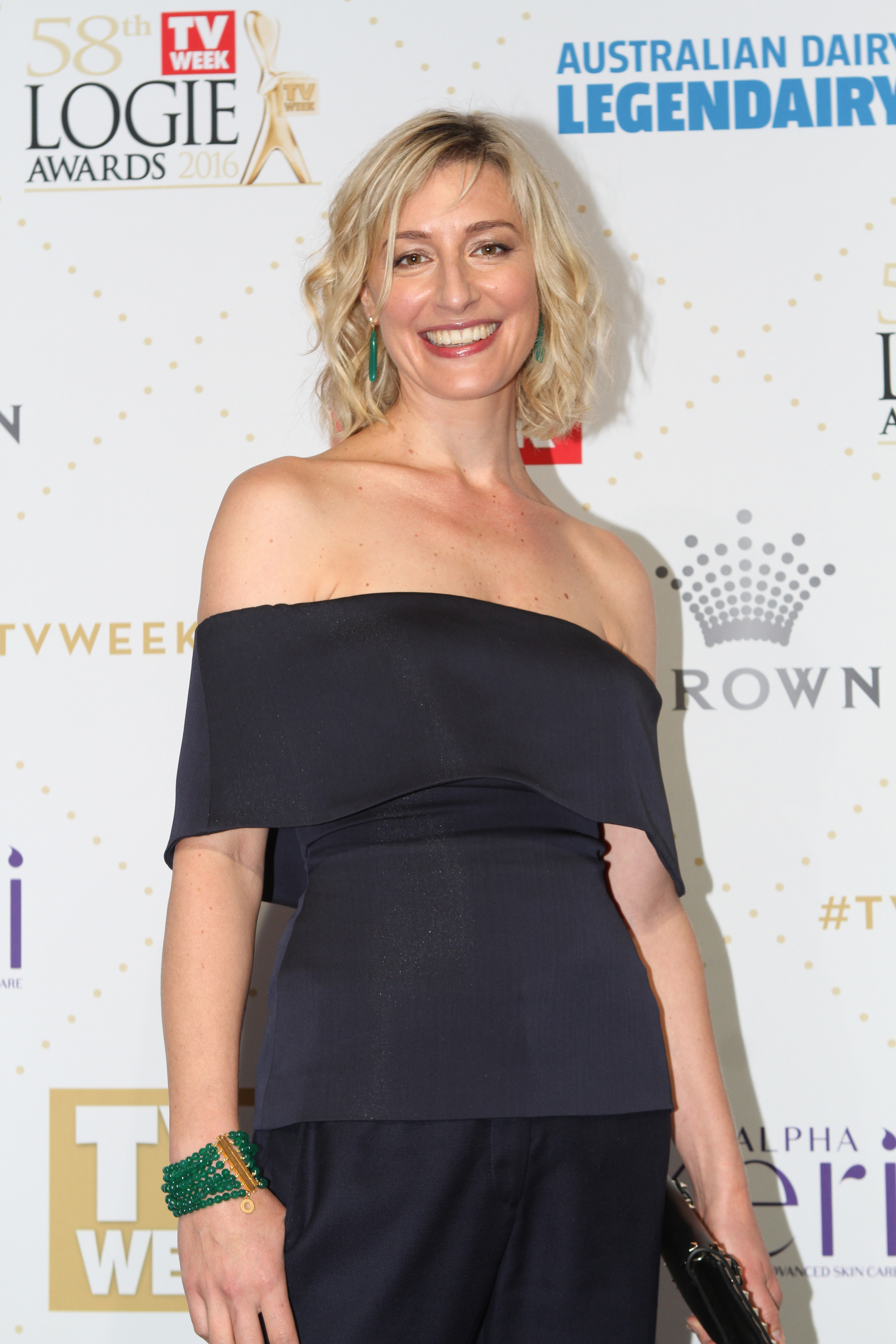
Sibylla Budd (pictured) played Doug's third love interest and eventual wife Carla Hughes.

Following the character's abortion Doug is devastated because he wanted to marry and have children with Sophie. But Vallejo told a News.com.au writer that "it (abortion) is a completely valid choice (for Sophie). It would be ridiculous for her to have a child to Doug at this point in her life." Wren said it was tough to play. He said that in one scene viewers see "Doug's entire future just collapse in front on him." The show explored a different side to the character when his relationship with Sophie fails. She leaves to work in Kenya. Doug causes trouble with Bec, drinks excessive alcohol and gets banned from driving his motorcycle following his drink driving charge. Siobhan Duck of the Herald Sun reported that the character had "hit rock bottom". The break-up was Wren's favourite Doug story from his entire tenure. It was "messy and horrible and hard" proving a challenge for him to act it out.

Doug also became centric to another topical storyline involving euthanasia. Doug discovers that terminally Cat Johnson (Peta Sergeant) plans to take her own life. Doug plays the role of being against the act. Wren told Miller that Doug tries to use the rationale approach and change her mind. But he is also understanding about her decision. The show bared the task to portray the storyline with sensitivity. Sergeant stated that there was a lot of honesty in the storyline. She also believed it was correct for ending for Cat.

=== Carla Hughes ===
In July 2013, it was announced that actress Sibylla Budd had been cast as Head of Emergency Medicine, Carla Hughes, who would be a new love interest for Doug. Budd said that she was interested to see viewer reaction to her character becoming between Doug and Sophie. They decide to get married but begin to fight over the proceedings. Doug and Carla decide to spontaneously marry at their own engagement party.

Vallejo told Seanna Cronin from The Toowoomba Chronicle that Sophie goes "crazy" and becomes determined to sabotage their relationship. But Sophie cannot deny that "Carla is a really awesome woman" which really annoys her. But still Sophie is convinced that she is meant to be with Doug. The actress believed it was the consistent scenario of realising that you love someone when they are with a new partner. Vallejo believed that the storyline offered closure for fans of Doug and Sophie. She concluded that "the Sophie and Doug storyline has been going on since the very beginning, what I love to watch on television is the 'will they, won't they'. Doug and Sophie have gone through a lot and this is the final axe (to grind) for their relationship."

Carla performs a test and fears she cannot hear her babies' heartbeat. She asks Sophie to perform an ultrasound try to determine it. A Soap World writer revealed that Carla is desperate and "clings to her sometime love rival for support." Sophie is unable to detect the heartbeat.

== Reception ==
For his portrayal of Doug, Wren was nominated in the Most Popular New Talent category at the 2012 Logie Awards. Guy David from The Newcastle Herald said "for most of the show's first season, Doug was sort of sidelined, which was surprising. After all, he's a good-looking fella with a prestigious job in emergency medicine." A fellow critic from the outlet branded him the show's "resident nice guy". Commenting on the character's love interests, Cameron Adams of the Herald Sun stated "Doctor Doug (the bloke who spends half the show sans shirt) is finally getting some lovin' with Bec, the hot lotto millionaire who, you may remember, didn't marry Matt. Cut to Bec and Doug telling their exes they're now officially an item. Or whatever Sophie and Doug were – that one was complicated." Debi Enker (The Age) believed that Doug only served as "an understanding lover for Sophie". Their colleague Paul Kalina said that the story between Doug, Sophie, Bec and Matt was really complicated and ironic. A writer from the Illawarra Mercury said that Doug and Bec's car crash was the moment the show began to explore "darker territory" moving away from "bubbly Aussie drama". The Age's Clare Rigden branded Doug a "dreamboat" doctor.
