= Australia's Cheapest Weddings =

- Genre: Reality, Wedding
- Narrated by: Melanie Vallejo
- Country of origin: Australia
- Original language: English
- No. of seasons: 1
- No. of episodes: 6

Production
- Running time: 60 minutes

Original release
- Network: Seven Network
- Release: 22 August – 17 November 2016

Australia's Cheapest Weddings is an Australian reality television series which premiered on the Seven Network on 22 August 2016. The program is narrated by Melanie Vallejo and follows couples who plan their wedding on a very small budget.

After three episodes, following poor ratings, Channel Seven pulled the show from its schedule indefinitely but did not confirm its cancellation. Unaired episodes returned from 10 November 2016.

== Ratings ==
No.	Title	Air date	Timeslot	Overnight ratings		Consolidated ratings		Total viewers	Ref(s)
No.	Title	Air date	Timeslot	Viewers	Rank	Viewers	Rank	Total viewers	Ref(s)
1	Episode 1	22 August 2016	Monday 8:30pm	708,000	16	48,000	15	756,000	
2	Episode 2	29 August 2016	Monday 8:30pm	485,000	—N/a	—N/a	—N/a	485,000	
3	Episode 3	6 September 2016	Monday 8:30pm	391,000	—N/a	—N/a	—N/a	391,000	
4	Episode 4	10 November 2016	Thursday 8:30pm	455,000	15	38,000	16	492,000	
5	Episode 5	17 November 2016	Thursday 8:30pm	538,000	11	37,000	12	575,000	
6	Episode 6	17 November 2016	Thursday 9:30pm	461,000	15	35,000	16	496,000	
