= Nathin Butler =

Australian actor, writer and producer

Nathin Art Butler
- Born: Australia
- Education: National Institute of Dramatic Art (BFA)
- Occupations: Writer, Producer, Actor
- Years active: 2007–present

Nathin Art Butler is an Australian actor, writer and producer. His career has spanned over 300 episodes of television and 15 films in America and Australia, including NCIS: Los Angeles, Hawaii Five-0, General Hospital and Westworld.

== Early life ==
Born in Australia, Butler grew up on a cattle ranch in Queensland. His father worked on the ranch and his mother was a country singer. As a child, Butler was interested in playing guitar and singing. In high school, he participated in many theatrical productions. At age 17, Butler was accepted into National Institute of Dramatic Art.

== Career ==
In 2008, at age 23, Butler moved to Los Angeles to pursue a professional career as a writer and an actor.

Butler's most prominent television roles were that of Dr. Ewen Keenan in General Hospital and as Nick Towne in Hawaii Five-0. His other film and television credits include X-Men Origins: Wolverine, Australia, The Pacific, the Hulu series Casual, Winners & Losers and Agents of S.H.I.E.L.D. In 2020, Butler was to appear in season 3 of Westworld.

Butler has created several projects and is writing and producing an Australian true crime drama titled Bloodwood.

== Personal life ==
Butler resides with his wife Irina and two children in the Woodland Hills section of Los Angeles.
