= Melissa Bergland =

Australian actress

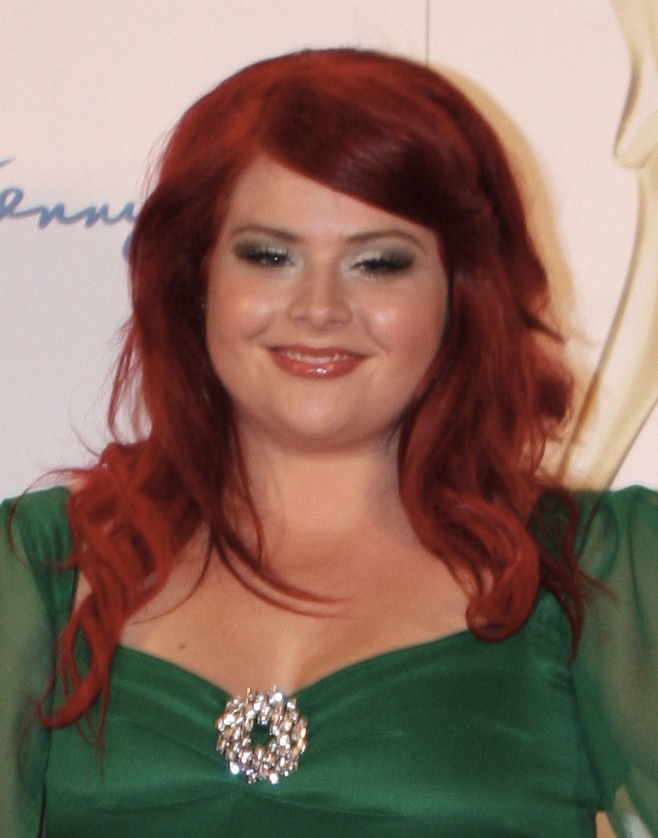
- Bergland at the 2011 Logie Awards
- Born: Adelaide, Australia
- Occupation: Actress
- Years active: 2010–present

Melissa Bergland is an Australian actress best known for her role as Jenny Gross in the Seven Network drama Winners & Losers.

== Early life ==
Bergland was born in Adelaide and she attended Pembroke School. Her father died of cancer when she was 14. Bergland then attended Flinders University, where she completed a Bachelor of Arts degree in drama. Bergland then went to the Victorian College of the Arts and she spent six months studying acting in New York. Bergland is also a singer and possesses a mezzo-soprano vocal range.

== Career ==
Bergland created and toured a cabaret show called Blue Eyed Soul at the Adelaide Fringe Festival. Bergland was in the final stages of auditions for a production of Hairspray when she was asked to audition for the role of Jenny Gross in Bevan Lee's new drama Winners & Losers. Bergland wore her own glasses and sported her "signature" red hair, which the producers loved and decided to keep for the character. Bergland made her television acting debut as Jenny.

After wrapping the third series of Winners & Losers, Bergland flew to Los Angeles in August and signed with Untitled Management. Two weeks later she was cast as the lead in Relative Happiness, an independent Canadian film based on the eponymous novel by Lesley Crewe. Bergland stars as Lexie Ivy, a bed and breakfast owner, who is looking for love. After filming on Relative Happiness wrapped, Bergland returned to Australia to continue working on Winners & Losers. Bergland appears in the 2016 romantic comedy film Spin Out, alongside Xavier Samuel and Morgan Griffin.

In 2019, Bergland appeared in the fourth episode of the Hulu anthology horror series Into the Dark. In 2024, she starred in Robert Lang's mockumentary film Mind, Body & Soul.

== Filmography ==
Year	Title	Role	Notes
2011	Underbelly Files: Tell Them Lucifer was Here	Joanne Debs	
2011–2016	Winners & Losers	Jenny Gross	Main cast
2012	10 Terrorists	Car Hijack Victim	
2014	Relative Happiness	Lexie Ivy	
2016	Spin Out	Mary	
2019	Into the Dark	Chloe	Episode: "New Year, New You"
2024	Mind Body & Soul	Mimi Wilde	
2024	Matlock	Rosie Martin	Episode: "No, No Monsters"

== Awards and nominations ==
Year	Award	Category	Result
2012	Logie Awards	Most Popular New Female Talent	Won
2012	Logie Awards	Most Outstanding New Talent	Nominated
