= Virginia Gay =

Australian actress (born 1981)

- Born: 16 September 1981 (age 45); Sydney, New South Wales, Australia
- Occupations: Actress, writer, director
- Years active: 2001–present
- Known for: All Saints; Safe Home; Savage River
- Website: Lisa Mann Creative Management

Virginia Gay is an Australian actress, writer, and director, mostly known for her work on the Australian TV dramas Winners & Losers (as Frances James) and All Saints (as Gabrielle Jaeger).

== Early life and education ==
Born in Sydney, Australia, Gay attended Summer Hill Public School and Newtown High School of the Performing Arts in Sydney as a drama and music student.

She studied English literature and performance studies at Sydney University and was a member of the Sydney University Dramatic Society from 2001 to 2003. She left Sydney University and enrolled at the Western Australian Academy of Performing Arts (WAAPA), at Edith Cowan University, Perth, where she graduated in 2005 with an Advanced Diploma of Performing Arts. She won the Coles Myer Institute Vocational Student of the Year award and the Sangora Education Foundation Award for Vocational Education and Training.

== Career ==
While still at WAAPA, Gay unsuccessfully auditioned for the role of Ricky on All Saints. However, she impressed the directors so much that after graduation in 2006, she was called in to audition for the role of Gabrielle Jaeger, and won the role.

In 2008, she appeared with Ian Moss (of Cold Chisel fame) as her professional partner on the reality series It Takes Two, and the pair came third. Gay and Moss made It Takes Two history, scoring a 10 from judge Ross Wilson in their first performance on the show.

In October 2008, Gay was part of the cast in a concert performance of the musical Breast Wishes in support of breast cancer.

In February/March 2009, when Shane Jenek (Courtney Act) injured his leg in a skiing accident, Gay was asked to replace Jenek in the production Gentlemen Prefer Blokes for the Mardi Gras festival.

From March 2011 on, Gay portrayed Frances James in the TV series Winners & Losers on the Seven Network.

From 2011 to 2016, Gay made several appearances as a guest panellist on the ABC's First Tuesday Book Club, hosted by Jennifer Byrne.

During August 2012, Gay performed her cabaret show Dirty Pretty Songs at the Edinburgh Fringe Festival in The Famous Spiegeltent.

In 2016, Gay played the title character in Hayes Theatre Co's production of Calamity Jane. It was directed by Richard Carroll, with musical director Nigel Ubrihien, choreographer Cameron Mitchell, and producer Michelle Guthrie. The show ran from August 3 to 7. This was Calamity Janes professional debut in Australia, although the play has a long production history via Australian amateur troupes. Virginia Gay reprised the title role in a full production of Calamity Jane which played at the Hayes Theatre from 8 March - 1 April 2017 and later at the Belvoir Theatre, Sydney. It then toured to many venues in south-eastern Australia, including Melbourne and Canberra in 2018.

In 2022, Virginia Gay wrote and performed in the play, Cyrano for the Melbourne Theatre Company. The play is a gender-flipped, modern re-imagining of Cyrano de Bergerac written in 1897 by Edmond Rostand.

In 2022, Gay joined the filming for the SBS drama Safe Home and was a part of the ABC drama Savage River as the character of Rachel Kennedy.

In May 2023, it was announced that Gay would participate in the twentieth series of Dancing with the Stars and was paired with Ian Waite. In the same year, she appeared on the fifth season of Thank God You're Here.

In June 2023 Gay was announced as the artistic director of the 2024 season of the Adelaide Cabaret Festival. Gay was later announced to return as the 2025 Artistic Director of the Cabaret Festival.

== Personal life ==
In June 2008, Gay was the victim of a violent assault by two men in the suburb of Marrickville in Sydney. The men then went on to murder chef Daniel Owen.

== Charity work ==
In May 2009, Gay was the national ambassador for Cystic Fibrosis Australia's annual awareness and fundraising campaign 65 Roses Day. Gay also attends the Good Friday Appeal held in Melbourne every year to support the Royal Children's Hospital.

== Filmography ==
=== Film ===
| Year | Title | Role | Notes |
|---|---|---|---|
| 2005 | Once Upon a Time | Gabriella | Short |
| 2006 | Violet | Woman in toilet | Short |
| 2008 | Winners & Losers | Alison Atkinson | Short |
| 2015 | Palindromes | Narrator (voice) | Short |
| 2017 | Mrs McCutcheon | Mrs. Clutterbuck | Short |
| 2017 | Naked Strangers | DJ Benny J (voice) | |
| 2018 | Paper Cut | 000 Operator (voice) | Short |
| 2019 | Judy and Punch | Ma | |

=== Television ===
| Year | Title | Role | Notes | Ref |
|---|---|---|---|---|
| 2006 | Nightmares & Dreamscapes: From the Stories of Stephen King | Fan #1 | Episode: "The Road Virus Heads North" | |
| 2006 | The Team | Virginia (voice) | TV series | |
| 2006–2009 | All Saints | Gabrielle Jaeger | Main role (series 9–12) | |
| 2011 | Some Say Love | Various | Episode: "Pilot" | |
| 2011–2016 | Winners & Losers | Frances James | Regular role | |
| 2019 | Preacher | Truck driver | Episode: "Last Supper" | |
| 2022 | After the Verdict | Trish | 6 episodes | |
| 2022 | Savage River | Rachel Kennedy | ABC TV: 6 episode crime drama | |
| 2022 | The Crew's Ship | Maggie | | |
| 2023 | We Interrupt This Broadcast | Various | 7 episodes | |
| 2023 | Mother and Son | Liz | 3 episodes | |
| 2023 | Safe Home | Eve | 4 episodes | |
| 2024 | Colin from Accounts | Rumi | 2 episodes | |

=== Self appearances ===
| Year | Title | Role | Notes |
|---|---|---|---|
| 2023 | Dancing with the Stars | Self | 7 episodes |
| 2023 | Thank God You're Here | Self | Season 5 Episode 3 |
| 2022 | The Cook Up with Adam Liaw | Self | 1 episode |
| 2009 | Good News Week | Herself | Series 7 Episode 34 |

== Theatre ==
| Year | Title | Role | Venue | Notes |
|---|---|---|---|---|
| 2012 | On the Production of Monsters | Shari | Melbourne Theatre Company | |
| 2012 | Dirty Pretty Songs | Herself | The Spiegeltent, Edinburgh Festival | Also Adelaide Cabaret Festival and other venues. |
| 2013 | Songs to Self-Destruct To | Herself | Adelaide Cabaret Festival | |
| 2013 | The Beast | Sue | Melbourne Theatre Company | |
| 2016 | High Society | Liz Imbrie | Hayes Theatre Company | |
| 2016 | Calamity Jane | Calamity Jane | Hayes Theatre and Belvoir Theatre | In 2018 toured to Melbourne, Canberra and other venues in Australia. |
| 2016 | Wonderful Town | Ruth | Sydney Opera House, Concert Hall | With Squabblogic and Sydney Philharmonic Choir |
| 2016 | Hidden Sydney - The Glittering Mile | Bea Miles | The World Bar (formerly The Nevada) | in collaboration with Trevor Ashley and Working Management |
| 2017 | Vivid White | Güüs | Melbourne Theatre Company | |
| 2022 | Cyrano | Cyrano | Melbourne Theatre Company | written by Virginia Gay after Edmond Rostand |

== Awards and nominations ==
| Year | Award | Category | Work | Result |
|---|---|---|---|---|
| 2017 | Sydney Theatre Awards | Best female performer in a musical | Calamity Jane | Won |
