= Zoe Tuckwell-Smith =

Australian actress

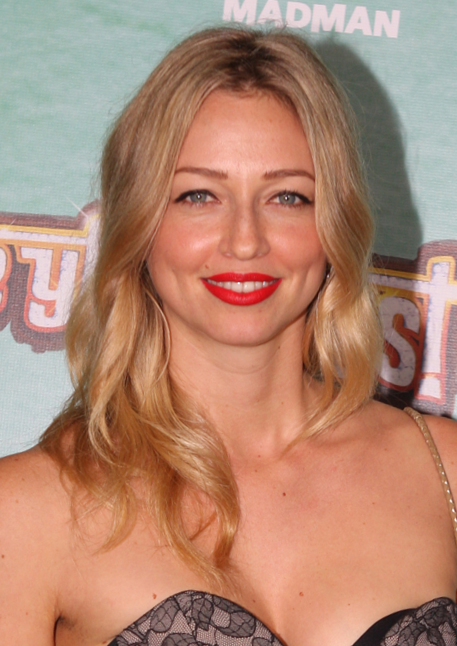
- Tuckwell-Smith in February 2013
- Born: c. 1982 (age c. 43); Sydney, New South Wales, Australia
- Occupation: Actress
- Spouse: Damon Gameau (m. 2016)
- Children: 2

Zoë Tuckwell-Smith (born c. 1982) is an Australian actress. She is best known for her role as Bec Gilbert on the Australian television show Winners & Losers.

== Early life ==
Zoë Tuckwell-Smith was born in Sydney. Shortly after, her parents returned to Bangladesh where they were working at the time. Tuckwell-Smith's parents divorced when she was five years old and she was raised by her mother in Sydney. Tuckwell-Smith visited her father during her school holidays. Tuckwell-Smith enjoyed acting from a young age and said "I've always been a dreamer – imaginative and creative. As a child I loved putting on plays and making up stories to perform for my parents or my toys!." After finishing high school, Tuckwell-Smith was accepted into the National Institute of Dramatic Art (NIDA) and graduated three years later.

== Career ==
In 2004, Tuckwell-Smith appeared in Six Pack, All Saints, and The Cooks. She went on to appear in Home and Away and In Search of Paradise. Tuckwell-Smith was cast in Stupid Stupid Man in 2007. The following year, the actress made appearances in The Cut and The Strip.

As well as television, Tuckwell-Smith has appeared in various feature films, including Son of the Mask (2004), Gone (2005), Cactus (2008) and Primal (2010). In 2010, Tuckwell-Smith also guested in Short Stack's video clip for "Planets".

In 2011, Tuckwell-Smith joined the cast of Winners & Losers in the leading role of Rebecca "Bec" Gilbert. She relocated to Melbourne from Sydney for filming.

Tuckwell-Smith appears in the 2019 documentary film 2040 written and directed by her husband Damon Gameau.

== Personal life ==
Tuckwell-Smith began dating actor Damon Gameau in 2009, after the couple were introduced to each other by fellow actor Gyton Grantley, while they were both in East Timor. Tuckwell-Smith and Gameau announced that they were expecting their first child in June 2013, and Tuckwell-Smith gave birth to the couple's daughter, Velvet Gameau, in November 2013. Tuckwell-Smith and Gameau married in January 2016.

== Filmography ==
Film and television
Year	Title	Role	Notes
2004	Son of the Mask	Mrs. Babcock	First film role
2004	Six Pack	Charlie Butterfield	First television role
2004	All Saints	Elle Campbell	Season 7, episode 28
2004	The Cooks	Anna	
2005	Home and Away	Lisa Stanniford	
2005	Gone	Ingrid	
2006	In Search of Paradise	Nicki	
2007	Stupid Stupid Man	Gwen	
2008	Cactus	Sammy	
2008	The Strip	Cassie	
2010	Primal	Anja	
2011–2014	Winners & Losers	Bec Gilbert	Leading role
2014	That Sugar Film	Herself	Supporting role
2019	2040	Herself	Supporting role
