= Melanie Vallejo =

Australian actress (b. 1979)

- Born: Adelaide, Australia
- Occupation: Actress
- Years active: 2002-present
- Spouse: Matt Kingston (m. 2011)
- Children: 2

Melanie Vallejo is an Australian actress best known for portraying Madison Rocca, the Blue Mystic Ranger in Power Rangers Mystic Force, and Sophie Wong in the Australian television series Winners & Losers.

== Early life and education ==
Melanie Vallejo was born in Australia. She is of Filipino and Ukrainian descent.

In 2001, she graduated from Flinders University Drama Centre.

== Career ==
Vallejo played the role of shy Madison Rocca in Power Rangers Mystic Force. Since then, she has starred in other Australian shows, including Winners & Losers.

On 17 June 2026, Vallejo was named in the extended cast for Stan Australia film Scales.

== Personal life ==
Vallejo married New Zealander Matt Kingston, an advertising planner, in June 2011. They live in New Zealand and have two children.

== Filmography ==
=== Film ===
Year	Title	Role
2008	Dying Breed	Rebecca
2009	The Sculptor	Renee
2018	Upgrade	Asha Trace
TBA	Scales	Evangeline

=== Television ===
Year	Title	Role
2005	All Saints	Lynica Forbes
2006	Power Rangers: Mystic Force	Madison Rocca (Blue Mystic Ranger)
2008	Packed to the Rafters	Kat Ripley
2010	Dance Academy	Dana Strong
2011-2016	Winners & Losers	Sophie Wong
2016	Australia's Cheapest Weddings	Narrator
2025	All Her Fault	Sarah Larsen

=== Theatre ===
- The Return (2002–2003) .... Lisa, productions at Adelaide Fringe Festival, Adelaide Come Out Festival, Edinburgh Festival Fringe
- Gosling (2003) .... Sydney Theatre Company production
- Myth, Propaganda and Disaster in Nazi Germany & Contemporary America (2003 and 2005) .... Marguerite, Sydney Theatre Company production
- Morph (2004) .... Grace Black, Adelaide Fringe Festival production
- Baghdad Wedding (2009) .... Luma, Belvoir St Theatre production
