= 2017 in Philippine television =

The following is a list of events affecting Philippine television in 2017. Events listed include television show debuts, finales, cancellations, and channel launches, closures and rebrandings, as well as information about controversies and carriage disputes.

== Events ==
=== January ===
- January 30 – Solar Entertainment Corporation aired the live coverage of Miss Universe 2016 together with ABS-CBN, TV5, and GMA.

=== February ===
- February 1 - After a year and 8 momths, Catsup has ceased its operations by TV5 Network, Inc. due to low ratings, programming redundancies and lack of advertising support.
- February 14–15 – The Digital TV Summit was held in Novotɲ̩el Manila, Quezon City.
- February 28 – Light Network migrated its broadcast signal reception to digital terrestrial transmission from switching off its analog frequency in Metro Manila after almost 11 years. Digital transmission began the following day.

=== March ===
- March 2–3 – TV Patrol celebrated its 30th anniversary, becoming the longest-running Filipino news program in the Philippines, since it premiered in 1987.
- March 5 – Maymay Entrata of Cagayan de Oro was hailed as the Big Winner of Pinoy Big Brother Lucky Season 7, making the said season the longest season in the history of Pinoy Big Brother that surpassed Unlimited.
- March 7 – Fox+, a streaming service owned by Fox Networks Group, was launched and became available in the Philippines.
- March 11 – Noven Belleza of Victorias City, Negros Occidental, Visayas was hailed as It's Showtime's first-ever Tawag ng Tanghalan Grand Champion. It was held at the Newport Performing Arts Theater, Resorts World Manila, Pasay.
- March 18 – Blaster Silonga (Electric Guitarist) of Marikina was hailed as the Ultimate Music Hero on Eat Bulaga!.
- March 25 – Maribel Rilo and Aldrin Ocol (#AlBel, Dance Tandem No. 3) was hailed as the first-ever Dancing in Tandem: Nagmahal, Nasaktan, Nagsayaw grand winner on It's Showtime.
- March 31 – Michelle Arceo of Mandaluyong was crowned as the first-ever Gandang Filipina of Wowowin.

=== April ===
- April 3
  - ABS-CBN News Channel has switched its airing of aspect ratio format quality on the channel's standard-definition feed and its programming to widescreen format (16:9) as being converted its mitigation of reception through Sky Cable and other cable providers, iWant TV, TFC IPTV, and other digital platforms after 20 years and ten months on the usage of broadcast video picture resolution that migrated from fullscreen format (4:3).
  - CNN Philippines (owned by Nine Media Corporation and Warner Bros. Discovery and parent by Radio Philippines Network) has switched its airing of aspect ratio format quality on the channel feed and its programming to widescreen format (16:9) as being converted its mitigation of reception through analog and digital signal reception through free TV and other cable and satellite providers after more than 2 years on the usage of broadcast video picture resolution that migrated from fullscreen format (4:3).
- April 9 – Awra Briguela of Las Piñas (impersonated as Nicki Minaj) won as the first Your Face Sounds Familiar Kids grand winner. It was held at the Newport Performing Arts Theater, Resorts World Manila, Pasay.
- April 10 – Sky Cable, Sky Direct, Destiny Cable & Sky On Demand was dropped with Solar Entertainment Corporation cable channels: Basketball TV, Jack TV, CT, Solar Sports & NBA Premium TV allegedly due to Sky Cable's unpaid carriage fees. The dispute was occurred just in time for the start of the 2017 NBA playoffs which been held five days later. In addition, Solar terminates the programming involving the boxing matches of Manny Pacquiao, the free-to-air and radio broadcasting rights to Pacquiao's matches with GMA Network and its radio broadcasting arm was not unaffected by this.
- April 12 - eGG Network, a dedicated e-sports and gaming channel owned by MEASAT Satellite Systems (under the joint venture of Rocketfuel Entertainment Sdn Bhd.) through its partner BEAM TV, was launched on digital subchannel via Channel 32 and became available in the Philippines.
- April 17 - DZRH News Television (owned by Manila Broadcasting Company) has switched its airing of aspect ratio format quality on the channel feed and its programming to widescreen format (16:9) as being converted its mitigation of reception through analog and digital signal reception through cable and satellite providers after 55 years on the usage of broadcast video picture resolution that migrated from fullscreen format (4:3).
- April 21 – President Rodrigo Duterte signs an act regarding the renewal of the television and radio franchises of GMA Network, Inc. for another 25 years in order to provide free public service time equivalent of 10% of all its ad time to the government to relay important public announcements and warnings as well as requiring to make closed captioning available for its programs. Rival network ABS-CBN Corporation also plans to file a renewal for their television and radio franchises following the network was critical by the president for its twisting news reports as well as failing to provide the airtime he had paid for during his election campaign in 2016.
- April 24 – Dobol B sa News TV returned to television after a 5-year hiatus.

=== May ===
- May 6
  - The Ateneo Blue Eagles wins the UAAP Season 79 men's volleyball championship title after defeating the NU Bulldogs 2–0 in a best-of-three series. This was their 3rd consecutive title, and also the team to have a perfect 16–0 record.
  - The DLSU Lady Spikers wins the UAAP Season 79 women's volleyball championship title after defeating the Ateneo Lady Eagles 2–0 in a best-of-three series. This was their 10th championship title as they won their title, back-to-back.
- May 11 - Sonshine Media Network International (owned by the Kingdom of Jesus Christ led by Apollo Quiboloy) has switched its airing of aspect ratio format quality on the channel feed and its programming to widescreen format (16:9) as being converted its mitigation of reception through analog and digital signal reception through free TV and other cable and satellite providers after 30 years on the usage of broadcast video picture resolution that migrated from fullscreen format (4:3).
- May 15
  - Sky Cable launched Aniplus Asia on their channel lineup.
  - DW-TV is now on Cignal on channel 168 on their channel lineup.
- May 18 – ABS-CBN Corporation launched "Kapamilya Tickets" (KTX), an online portal that can purchase tickets to get access on its produced live events, shows, and experiences.
- May 20 – Laride Twins (Grand Finalist no. 4) was hailed as Twin It to Win It Grand Winner on It's Showtime.
- May 27 – JC Teves, Debbie Then, Kim Cruz and Arturo Daza were named as the four new myx VJs at the end of MYX VJ Search 2017.
- May 30 – Angela Lehmann from Bicol was declared as the grand winner of Philippines' Next Top Model: High Street competition.

=== June ===
- June 4 – Wacky Kiray was hailed as the first I Can Do That! Greatest Entertainer.
- June 10 – Jhon Clyd Talili of Surigao del Sur emerged as the grand champion of It's Showtime's Tawag ng Tanghalan Kids that spanned for three months.
- June 22 – Wansapanataym celebrated its 20th anniversary on television.
- June 25 – Umagang Kay Ganda celebrated its 10th anniversary on television.
- June 28 – Maureen Wroblewitz representing the Philippines, was declared as the grand winner of Asia's Next Top Model (cycle 5).

=== July ===
- July 2 – GMA Network broadcasts the boxing match between Manny Pacquiao and Australian boxer Jeff Horn, billed as the "Battle of Brisbane", which took place at Suncorp Stadium in Brisbane, Queensland, Australia. This will be the only Manny Pacquiao's fight to be under the new production ownership of the concert promoter ALV Events International, it is the only Pacquiao fight to be aired exclusively on the said network after they cut ties with Solar Entertainment following the bout against Jessie Vargas In 2016. and it will be the last Pacquiao fight to broadcast on the network after 11 years. The boxing match was also broadcast live on the network's radio station DZBB-AM and the network of RGMA radio stations nationwide; ABS-CBN (through its subsidiary Sky Cable) has also sub-licensed the live broadcast of the fight to all cable and satellite broadcasting affiliates nationwide via pay-per-view; the network also announced that they aired the next bout against Lucas Matthysse next year via tape-delay on its mother network and its rebroadcast on its sister network S+A.
- July 14
  - Sarah Lahbati and Richard Gutierrez are engaged. She wears an engagement ring in Switzerland during Its Gutz to be a Gutierrez on E!
  - ABS-CBN launched "Kapamilya, Thank You!", a loyalty program tasked to give, earn or redeem points to its customers with gifts, rewards and privileges as a thank you for its support on the network, as well as "Kapamilya Accounts", an authentication scheme system similar to other online services that allows the user to access media-owned sites using an account ID.
- July 23 – Good Morning Kuya celebrated its 10th anniversary on television.
- July 27 – MyPhone launched "MyPhone DTV Dongle", a digital TV dongle for Android smartphones.
- July 30 – Jona Soquite of Davao City won as the first-ever The Voice Teens grand champion.

=== August ===
- August 1 – MTVph was launched on all cable/satellite providers in the Philippines. It is co-owned by Viacom International Media Networks Asia and Solar Entertainment Corporation.
- August 21 – FPJ's Ang Probinsyano celebrated its 100th week on television.

=== September ===
- September 21 – TV personality and former ABS-CBN news reporter Atom Araullo returned to GMA Network.
- September 28 – FPJ's Ang Probinsyano celebrated its 2nd anniversary on television.
- September 30 – Julia Gonowon of Camarines Sur was crowned as the first ever Miss Millennial Philippines 2017 of noontime show, Eat Bulaga!. It was held at the SM Mall of Asia Arena.

=== October ===
- October 6 – After nearly four years, Blink has ceased its operations by OMNI Digital Media Ventures (an affiliate of Solar Entertainment Corporation) due to the review of the management's decision through changes in business direction.
- October 13 – MediaQuest Holdings thought TV5 Network Inc. rebrands its sporting division to ESPN 5 as part of a partnership with The Walt Disney Company and Hearst Corporation, the co-owners of ESPN Inc. the rebranding was held to coinciding with the start of the 2017 PBA Governors' Cup Finals. Prior to the TV5-ESPN partnership, the ESPN branding was formerly used by Fox Networks Group Asia before rebranded to Fox Sports Asia in 2014.
- October 19 – Globe Telecom and Roku, Inc. signed a licensing agreement to utilize a Roku powered system on an upcoming digital media player device made by Globe.
- October 21 – Team Vhong hailed as It's Showtime's eighth anniversary (Magpasikat 2017: Let's Celebr8!) champion.
- October 24 – Globe Telecom launched a digital media player device box, Globe Streamwatch.
- October 30 – Intercontinental Broadcasting Corporation signs on its full digital transmission after a set of test broadcasts; later on November 8, the new station ID was debuted featuring some clips from old IBC programs (excluding programming from the network's primetime blocks (Viva Entertainment's VTV on IBC/Viva TV on IBC, TV5 Network Inc.'s AKTV and Asian Television Content Corporation's ATC @ IBC) as well as some old station IDs from 1975 to 1990 and 1994 onwards (including 1990–92 during Islands TV 13 era).

=== November ===
- November 4 – Karen Ibasco was crowned as Miss Earth 2017 held at Mall of Asia Arena, Pasay.
- November 13 – ABS-CBN launches the Christmas song Just Love Ngayong Christmas, after the news program TV Patrol.
- November 26 – "Titibo-Tibo", a song entry composed by Libertine Amistoso and interpreted by Moira Dela Torre was named as Himig Handog 2017 grand winner held at ABS-CBN. This was aired on ABS-CBN's "ASAP".
- November 27 – Christi McGarry was hailed as Eat Bulaga!'s Ultimate Jackpot En Poy Champion.
- November 28 – Born To Be Wild celebrated its 10th anniversary on television.

=== December ===
- December 2 – Donna Cariaga was hailed as Funny One Season 2 grand winner on It's Showtime.
- December 3 – The Ateneo Blue Eagles clinched the UAAP Season 80 men's basketball title after defeating the archrivals De La Salle Green Archers 2–1 in winner-take-all game 3 of the best-of-three finals series held at the Smart Araneta Coliseum in Quezon City. This was their 9th basketball championship title since they last won in 2012.
- December 5 – Ika-6 na Utos celebrated its first anniversary on television.
- December 20 – GMA Network and GMA News TV signs on its full-time digital transmissions.
- December 31
  - After 2 years and 9 months, CT ceased broadcast by Solar Entertainment due to low ratings, programming redundancies and cost-cutting measures. The closure was announced by Solar Entertainment a day before the air.
  - Dream Satellite TV officially ceased its operations.

== Debuts ==
=== ABS-CBN ===
The following are programs that debuted on ABS-CBN:

- January 7: Your Face Sounds Familiar Kids season 1
- January 9: A Love to Last
- January 23: My Dear Heart
- February 5: Superbook Reimagined (season 3)
- February 13: The Better Half and Wildflower
- March 6: Love in the Moonlight
- March 11: I Can Do That
- April 2: The Legend of Korra (seasons 3 and 4)
- April 16: Pluma (season 2)
- April 16: The Voice Teens season 1
- April 24: Pusong Ligaw
- May 1: Ikaw Lang ang Iibigin
- May 8: Goblin and Legend of the Blue Sea
- May 13: Bet on Your Baby (season 3)
- June 10: G Diaries and Lethal Weapon (season 1)
- June 17: MathDali
- June 19: La Luna Sangre
- July 10: Weightlifting Fairy
- August 12: Little Big Shots
- September 9: Dok Ricky, Pedia
- September 11: The Promise of Forever
- September 16: I Can See Your Voice
- September 25: My Dearest Intruder and The Good Son
- October 30: Hwarang
- November 27: Hanggang Saan

==== Re-runs ====
- July 17: Love in the Moonlight
- September 4: Legend of the Blue Sea
- October 29: Teenage Mutant Ninja Turtles (2012) season 3^{1}
- November 13: Goblin

Notes
^ ^{1} Originally aired on Yey!

=== GMA ===
The following are programs that debuted on GMA Network:

- January 9: Meant to Be
- January 15: Oreca Battle and People vs. the Stars
- January 16: Pokémon XY: Kalos Quest (season 18)
- January 22: Majin Bone
- January 23: The Big One
- January 30: Pinulot Ka Lang sa Lupa and Pretty Woman
- February 14: EZ Shop and Wolfblood (season 1)
- February 18: Case Solved and Full House Tonight
- February 20: Legally Blind
- February 27: Destined to be Yours
- March 6: Alien Surf Girls
- March 27: Ice Fantasy, Scarlet Heart and Voltes V (dub reboot)
- April 8: Rowdy Sumo Wrestler Matsutaro
- April 17: D' Originals and Moribito: Guardian of the Spirit
- April 23: Follow Your Heart
- April 30: Daig Kayo ng Lola Ko
- May 1: Aliados
- May 13: Dragon Collection
- May 20: Tadhana
- May 22: Mulawin vs. Ravena
- May 29: My Love from the Star (remake)
- June 3: Celebrity Bluff (season 13)
- June 5: Street Fighter: Assassin's Fist
- June 12: Innocent Defendant
- June 19: Moribito II: The Anguish of the Destroyers
- June 26: I Heart Davao
- July 3: Impostora
- July 10: Haplos
- July 23: Road Trip (3rd incarnation)
- July 24: All About My Mom and Mirror of the Witch
- July 29: The Global Filipino
- August 9: Saimdang: Soulmates Across Time
- August 12: Grami's Circus Show
- August 13: Ultraman Ginga
- August 14: Alyas Robin Hood (season 2)
- August 19: G.R.I.N.D. Get Ready It's a New Day
- August 21: My Korean Jagiya
- August 28: One Mindanao (GMA Davao/GMA Cagayan de Oro/GMA General Santos)
- September 3: All-Star Videoke
- September 18: Let's Fight Ghost! and Super Ma'am
- September 23: Joker
- September 24: Bossing & Ai
- September 25: My Daughter, Geum Sa-weol and The Lolas' Beautiful Show
- September 30: Gaist Crusher
- October 2: Daimos (2017 dub reboot)
- October 4: Strong Girl Bong-soon
- October 23: One Piece season 10
- October 29: Stories for the Soul
- November 5: Philippine Seas
- November 20: Crimson Girl and Starry Night, Starry Sea
- November 27: Kambal, Karibal and My Secret Romance
- December 2: Light Up
- December 4: Dragon Ball Z Kai: The Final Chapters
- December 23: Gyrozetter
- December 25: The Romantic Doctor

==== Unknown ====
- Lifegiver

===== Re-runs =====
- January 28: Virtua Fighter
- February 11: One Piece season 3
- March 4: Dragon Ball Z
- May 22: Slam Dunk^{5}
- June 5: Sonic X
- July 10: Bleach season 6
- July 23: Pororo the Little Penguin and Thomas & Friends^{2}^{3}^{4}
- October 2: Jackie Chan Adventures^{1}^{6}

Notes
^ ^{1} Originally aired on ABS-CBN
^ ^{2} Originally aired on TV5
^ ^{3} Originally aired on Yey!
^ ^{4} Originally aired on Studio 23 (now S+A)
^ ^{5} Originally aired on ABC (now TV5)
^ ^{6} Originally aired on Jack TV

=== TV5 ===
The following are programs that debuted on TV5:

- January 9: All Hail King Julien, Attack on Titan: Junior High, Disaster Date, KanColle: Kantai Collection, Myriad Colors Phantom World, and The Adventures of Puss in Boots
- January 10: Voltron: Legendary Defender
- January 15: Ultimate Spider-Man and Winx Club
- February 4: Brillante Mendoza Presents
- February 5: FIBA World Basketball and Heavy Hitters: Elite Boxing
- February 13: Henry Hugglemonster (season 2)
- February 24: Vikings season 3
- February 27: Arrow season 3
- March 9: Marvel's Agents of S.H.I.E.L.D. season 2
- March 16: Prison Break season 1
- March 21: Dragons: Race to the Edge, Philippines' Next Top Model: High Street and Supergirl season 1
- April 12: Knights of Sidonia
- April 17: Asia's Next Top Model (cycle 5), The Flash season 2 and Timon & Pumbaa
- April 20: Norn9
- April 29: Wattpad Presents (new season)
- April 30: WWE SmackDown
- May 2: Quantico season 1
- May 8: Boiling Points
- May 11: Is It Wrong to Try to Pick Up Girls in a Dungeon?
- May 12: Scorpion
- May 21: Lakbai
- May 22: Tulong Ko, Pasa Mo
- May 25: The Walking Dead season 4
- June 4: Elena of Avalor
- June 27: Blindspot (season 1)
- July 5: Knights of Sidonia: Battle for Planet Nine
- July 11: Pimp My Ride
- July 29: Coke Studio Philippines (season 1) and Manindigan
- July 30: Turning Point
- July 31: Bunnicula
- August 28: Wabbit
- August 29: Supergirl season 2
- September 3: Japan Japan 47
- September 5: The Best of PSL
- September 9: Transformers: Robots in Disguise
- September 10: Bakbakan Na
- September 16: Oddbods
- October 1: Tukaan
- October 2: NFL Sunday Night Football
- October 21: 10 Signatures to Bargain with God and Hapi House
- October 22: Taddy Taddy Po and The Mysterious Case of Ana Madrigal
- October 23: Arrow season 4
- October 28: Angelo Rules
- November 6: Henry Hugglemonster (season 3)
- November 15: ESPN College Basketball (remained as NCAA College Basketball)
- November 17: Supernatural (season 12)
- November 20: The World of X Games
- November 26: Star vs. the Forces of Evil and Versus
- December 13: Blindspot (season 2)
- December 17: SportsCenter Philippines

==== Unknown ====
- Pulso: Aksyon Balita (formerly from ABS-CBN)

==== Re-runs ====
- January 7: Smallville season 2^{2}
- January 9: Higglytown Heroes and Once Upon a Time season 1^{1}
- January 15: Star Wars Rebels
- February 18: Third Eye
- February 27: Inspector Gadget (2015) and Krypto the Superdog
- May 8: The Jungle Bunch to the Rescue
- May 14: Hulk and the Agents of S.M.A.S.H.
- June 5: Doc McStuffins and Sofia the First
- June 24: Arrow season 2^{3}^{4}
- July 10: The Tom and Jerry Show
- August 5: Be Cool, Scooby-Doo!
- November 5: Lakbai
- November 6: Doc McStuffins
- December 1: Voltron: Legendary Defender

Notes
^ ^{1} Originally aired on S+A
^ ^{2} Originally aired on Studio 23 (now S+A)
^ ^{3} Originally aired on 2nd Avenue
^ ^{4} Originally aired on Jack TV

=== PTV ===
The following are programs that debuted on People's Television Network:

- January 8: Healthline and Sagisag Kultura TV
- January 23: Kilos Pronto
- February 1: Insider Exclusive Kapihan
- February 18: The Legendary Doctor: Hur Jun
- February 19: The Doctor is In (season 5)
- March 6: Like Pinas
- April 2: iTravel Pinas
- May 6: Philippines Football League
- May 8: Daily Info
- May 17: Bagong Pilipinas
- May 19: Mula sa Masa, Para sa Masa
- May 28: CGTN Block
- May 29: DOSTv: Science for the People
- June 14: PTV VisMin NewsBreak
- July 10: PTV News Headlines, Sentro Balita and Ulat Bayan
- August 15: Bitag Live
- September 15: Sa Totoo Lang
- September 18: PTV News (3rd incarnation)
- October 6: Damayan Ngayon
- October 16: Guangzhou: Ang Pamamalakad, PNA Newsroom, PTV Cordillera NewsBreak, PTV News Mindanao (PTV Davao) and PTV Sports (2nd incarnation)
- October 24: One ASEAN
- October 25: Kalusugan Mo, Sagot Ko (Philhealth)

=== IBC ===
The following are programs that debuted on IBC:

- February 4: Salpukan 360
- July 1: An Evening with Raoul
- September 1: Business and Beyond (season 2)

=== Minor networks ===
The following are programs that debuted on minor networks:

- January 6: Chinatown TV on Net 25
- January 7: Metro Central Luzon Weekend Recap on CLTV 36
- January 9: Ing Balen on CLTV 36
- January 11: Focus on CLTV 36
- February 13: Life at its Best on CLTV 36
- May 8: Big@10 and Negososyo on CLTV 36
- May 21: UNTV Cup Executive Face Off 2017 on UNTV Public Service
- June 3: HANS-aya ng Buhay on CLTV 36
- June 13: The Pinoy Boy Vlogserye on CLTV 36
- September 17: UNTV Cup (season 6) on UNTV Public Service
- September 23: Istorya on UNTV Public Service
- September 30: The Dive Philippines on UNTV Public Service
- October 9: Chinese News TV (CNTV) on Net 25
- October 16: Freestyle Kitchen on Net 25
- October 28: Spotlight on UNTV Public Service
- December 1: Christmas from the Heart 2017 on SMNI

==== Unknown dates ====
- Balen, Discover Japan, Metro Central Luzon Weekend Recap, Pasada Balita, Sine Gitnang Luzon Originals and So to Speak on CLTV 36
- Beautiful Sunday and Gabay at Aksyon on Net 25

=== Other channels ===
The following are programs that debuted on other channels:

- January 1: Healing Galing (Sunday edition) and Iba 'Yung Pinoy on AksyonTV
- January 1: Doctor Stranger on Cine Mo!
- January 1: America's Got Talent season 11 on RTL CBS Entertainment
- January 2: Aksyon Solusyon, Bitag Live and Punto Asintado on AksyonTV
- January 2: People Behaving Badly on AXN Asia
- January 2: Lingkod Kapamilya sa DZMM on DZMM TeleRadyo
- January 2: Bitten (season 2) on ETC
- January 2: American Dad! season 13 on Jack TV
- January 2: Cheongdam-dong Alice on Jeepney TV
- January 4: Bones season 12 on 2nd Avenue
- January 4: Healthline with Cheryl Cosim on AksyonTV
- January 5: Alagang Kapatid sa Radyo5 on AksyonTV
- January 7: Love Idol and Magbago Tayo on AksyonTV
- January 8: Save with Jamie and The Biggest Loser USA season 14: Challenge America on 2nd Avenue
- January 8: Funny Ka, Pare Ko (season 3) on Cine Mo!
- January 8: Rainbow Ruby on Yey!
- January 10: It's Always Sunny in Philadelphia season 12 on Jack TV
- January 11: Hawaii Five-0 season 7 on AXN Asia
- January 14: Under the Dome season 1 on Fox TV Philippines
- January 14: Your Face Sounds Familiar Kids season 1 on Yey!
- January 16: The Rose of Guadalupe on Telenovela Channel
- January 17: NCRUCLAA Season 1 on Basketball TV and Solar Sports
- January 20: The Grind on AksyonTV
- January 20: Nobunagun on Hero
- January 22: Halfworlds (season 2) on HBO Asia
- January 22: Superstore season 2 and The Carmichael Show on Sony Channel
- January 23: Gametime on ANC
- January 25: CSI: Crime Scene Investigation season 5 on Fox TV Philippines
- January 27: Beautiful Bones: Sakurako's Investigation on Hero
- January 28: Ha-pi House on Sari-Sari Channel
- February 2: BrainDead on AXN Asia
- February 2: Friends to Lovers? on ETC
- February 2: Chicago Med and Minute to Win It (UK) on Sony Channel
- February 3: Training Day on 2nd Avenue
- February 4: Legal Edge on ANC
- February 4: Blood, Sweat & Heels (season 2) on ETC
- February 5: Mocha Uson Blog on DZRH News Television
- February 6: Newsroom Ngayon on CNN Philippines
- February 6: 24: Legacy on Fox Asia
- February 7: APB on 2nd Avenue
- February 7: Inazuma Eleven GO on Yey!
- February 8: Adventures of Sonic the Hedgehog on Yey!
- February 9: Legion on Fox
- February 10: No Tomorrow on RTL CBS Entertainment
- February 10: Gillette World Sport on S+A
- February 11: Reign (season 4) on ETC
- February 13: Reliable Sources on CNN Philippines
- February 14: Dragon Crisis! on Hero
- February 16: Ultimate Otaku Teacher on Hero
- February 17: The 100 (season 4) on Jack TV
- February 18: Harvest on CNN Philippines
- February 20: Cunning Single Lady on Jeepney TV
- February 21: FIBA World Basketball on AksyonTV
- February 22: Heavy Hitters: Elite Boxing on AksyonTV
- February 23: Dayaw (season 3) on ANC
- February 24: Powerless on ETC and Jack TV
- February 27: Early Edition on ANC
- February 27: Global Newsroom on CNN Philippines
- February 28: CSI: Crime Scene Investigation season 6 on Fox TV Philippines
- March 2: Mobil 1 The Grid on S+A
- March 3: Political Insider on CNN Philippines
- March 3: Red Envelope on Sari-Sari Channel
- March 4: Newsroom Weekend on CNN Philippines
- March 5: Dates on ETC
- March 5: The Fiercest of Them All on GMA News TV
- March 6: Winners & Losers season 5 on 2nd Avenue
- March 6: Hindsight on ETC
- March 6: Making History and Time After Time on Jack TV
- March 9: Survivor: Game Changers on Jack TV
- March 11: Sports Desk Weekend on CNN Philippines
- March 11: ChinoyTV on ANC
- March 11: Emergency Couple on Jeepney TV
- March 12: Jamie & Jimmy's Food Fight Club (season 1) on 2nd Avenue
- March 12: Sensory Couple on Cine Mo!
- March 12: Trippies on CNN Philippines
- March 18: Blindspot (season 2) on 2nd Avenue
- March 18: The Originals season 4 on ETC
- March 19: 40 is the New 30 on Colours
- March 22: The Heroic Legend of Arslan on Hero
- March 23: Pinas Sarap on GMA News TV
- March 27: Work Out New York on 2nd Avenue
- March 27: News Night on CNN Philippines
- March 27: It's Okay, That's Love on Jeepney TV
- March 27: Strawberry Shortcake's Berry Bitty Adventures (season 1) on Yey!
- March 27: Head Over Heels on Telenovela Channel
- March 29: Orange on Hero
- April 1: Martina Cole's The Runaway on CT
- April 2: The Biggest Loser USA season 15: Second Chances 2 on 2nd Avenue
- April 2: Mr Selfridge (season 2) on CT
- April 2: Are You the One? season 2 on ETC
- April 2: HitRecord on TV (season 1), Sisterhood of Hip Hop and This Is Mike Stud on Jack TV
- April 2: Himouto! Umaru-chan on Yey!
- April 3: CSI: Crime Scene Investigation season 7 on Fox TV Philippines
- April 4: Rich Kids of Beverly Hills on ETC
- April 5: Prison Break season 5 on 2nd Avenue
- April 5: Asia's Next Top Model (cycle 5) on Star World
- April 8: Metal Fight Beyblade 4D on Yey!
- April 10: NCIS season 12 on CT
- April 14: Gotham season 2 on Jack TV
- April 15: DC's Legends of Tomorrow season 1 on Jack TV
- April 17: Bandila and Rated K on DZMM TeleRadyo
- April 17: Team Yey! (season 2) on Yey!
- April 18: Madam Secretary season 3 on 2nd Avenue
- April 18: Matanglawin on DZMM TeleRadyo
- April 19: Ipaglaban Mo! on DZMM TeleRadyo
- April 19: iZombie (season 3) on ETC
- April 20: S.O.C.O.: Scene of the Crime Operatives on DZMM TeleRadyo
- April 21: Mukha on DZMM TeleRadyo
- April 21: Pandora in the Crimson Shell: Ghost Urn on Hero
- April 22: Hoop Nation on CNN Philippines
- April 24: Dobol B sa News TV on GMA News TV
- April 27: Project Runway season 15 on ETC
- April 28: Fate/kaleid liner Prisma Illya 3rei! on Hero
- April 29: Myx VJ Search on Myx
- April 29: Taddy Taddy Po on Sari-Sari Channel
- May 2: Brief Encounters on 2nd Avenue
- May 6: Beauty Crush and SNL Korea (season 9) on E!
- May 6: The Odd Couple (season 2) and You're the Worst (season 3) on Jack TV
- May 7: The K2 on Cine Mo!
- May 7: Open House Overhaul and The Expandables on ETC
- May 7: HitRecord on TV (season 2) on Jack TV
- May 8: Bitten (season 3) on ETC
- May 9: CSI: Crime Scene Investigation season 8 on Fox TV Philippines
- May 14: Odd Mom Out on ETC
- May 15: Lakas Tawa on Cine Mo!
- May 18: Project Runway All Stars season 5 on ETC
- May 18: Dennis the Menace on Yey!
- May 25: 91 Days on Hero
- May 26: Tadhana on GMA News TV
- May 26: Nogizaka Haruka no Himitsu on Hero
- May 28: Jamie & Jimmy's Food Fight Club (season 2) on 2nd Avenue
- May 31: House of Cards season 5 on RTL CBS Entertainment
- June 1: CSI: Crime Scene Investigation season 9 on Fox TV Philippines
- June 3: My Hero Nation (season 8) on Hero
- June 3: Tulong Ko, Pasa Mo on AksyonTV
- June 4: Skin Wars (season 2) on Jack TV
- June 5: Playing House (season 1) on ETC
- June 9: The Mysterious Case of Ana Madrigal (season 2) on Sari-Sari Channel
- June 10: The Americans season 5 on CT
- June 11: Knife Fight (season 3) and The Biggest Loser USA season 16: Glory Days on 2nd Avenue
- June 16: G Diaries on Lifestyle
- June 17: Lip Sync Battle USA on GMA News TV
- June 18: Beyond Today on GMA News TV
- June 19: Good Vibes and On the Spot on DZMM TeleRadyo
- June 19: La malquerida on Telenovela Channel
- June 21: Serbisyong Kapatid with Cheryl Cosim on AksyonTV
- June 22: Project Runway: Junior (season 3) on ETC
- June 22: The Kings on TLC Asia
- June 24: Agri Preneur on GMA News TV
- June 25: Who Lives Here? on ETC
- June 26: Haikyu!! season 3 on Hero
- June 29: Nogizaka Haruka no Himitsu: Purezza on Hero
- July 1: From Helen's Kitchen (season 1) on Colours
- July 1: The Strain (season 3) on CT
- July 1: Are You the One? season 3 on ETC
- July 1: Superstore season 1 on Jack TV
- July 2: Signal on Cine Mo!
- July 2: Brew Dogs (season 3), Best Bars in America (season 2) and Geeks Who Drink on Jack TV
- July 3: KonoSuba season 1 on Hero
- July 3: Spartan: Ultimate Team Challenge on Jack TV
- July 3: Harvey Beaks (season 1) on Yey!
- July 5: CSI: Crime Scene Investigation season 10 on Fox TV Philippines
- July 8: No Second Chance on CT
- July 8: The Better Half on Jeepney TV
- July 8: Metal Fight Beyblade Zero G and Teenage Mutant Ninja Turtles (2012) season 3 on Yey!
- July 9: University Town (season 2) on S+A
- July 10: Showbuzz on DZMM TeleRadyo
- July 13: Suits season 7 on 2nd Avenue, Diva and Jack TV
- July 15: Motive (season 3) on CT
- July 15: Rob the Robot on Yey!
- July 17: Game of Thrones season 7 on HBO Asia
- July 17: All Out!! on Hero
- July 22: Autopsy: The Last Hours of... (season 2) on CT
- July 23: Funny Ka, Pare Ko (season 4) on Cine Mo!
- July 24: BeyWheelz on Yey!
- July 25: The Slap on 2nd Avenue
- July 29: The Final Pitch on History
- August 3: MasterChef U.S. season 8 on Lifestyle
- August 5: Autopsy: The Last Hours of... (season 3) on CT
- August 5: You, Me and the Apocalypse on Jack TV
- August 5: Hourglass on Sari-Sari Channel
- August 6: Hell's Kitchen U.S. season 13 on 2nd Avenue
- August 7: Girlfriends' Guide to Divorce (season 2) on ETC
- August 7: CSI: Crime Scene Investigation season 11 on Fox TV Philippines
- August 7: BeyWarriors: BeyRaiderz on Yey!
- August 18: The Asterisk War (season 1) on Hero
- August 20: Ride PH on GMA News TV
- August 21: You've Have Been Warned Asia on Discovery Channel
- August 21: BeyWarriors: Cyborg on Yey!
- August 23: Keijo!!!!!!!! Hip Whip Girl on Hero
- August 27: The Expandables (season 2) on ETC
- August 28: DISHkarte of the Day (season 2) on GMA News TV
- September 1: The Kasambahays (season 1) on Sari-Sari Channel
- September 2: Autopsy: The Last Hours of... (season 4) on CT
- September 2: Myx Moves Street Dance Competition 2017 on Myx
- September 2: Thunderbird Sabong Nation on S+A
- September 3: In Touch with Dr. Charles Stanley on Fox TV Philippines
- September 4: Sports Desk @ 6:30pm on CNN Philippines
- September 6: The Ellen DeGeneres Show season 15 on 2nd Avenue
- September 6: CSI: Crime Scene Investigation season 12 on Fox TV Philippines
- September 9: Tayo the Little Bus on Yey!
- September 10: Hyde Jekyll, Me on Cine Mo!
- September 16: Black Work on CT
- September 17: Car Matchmaker (season 3), Heroes of Cosplay and Welcome to Fairfax on Jack TV
- September 17: Doowee Hooper Beat Band Competition (season 4) on S+A
- September 18: Twenty Again on Jeepney TV
- September 18: Sesame Street on Knowledge Channel
- September 19: Breathless on 2nd Avenue
- September 21: The Asterisk War (season 2) on Hero
- September 24: Bones season 11, Cold Case season 6, House season 7 and Unforgettable on Fox TV Philippines
- September 25: Pasada Pelikula on Jeepney TV
- September 25: Strawberry Shortcake's Berry Bitty Adventures (season 2) on Yey!
- September 26: Tanaka-kun is Always Listless on Hero
- September 26: The Big Bang Theory season 11 and This Is Us season 2 on Jack TV
- September 28: Survivor: Heroes vs. Healers vs. Hustlers on Jack TV
- September 30: A Gifted Man, Eleventh Hour, Fringe season 3, Stalker, The Mentalist season 4 and Without a Trace season 7 on Fox TV Philippines
- October 3: Lucifer (season 3) on Jack TV
- October 4: The Middle season 9 on 2nd Avenue
- October 6: DC's Legends of Tomorrow season 2 on 2nd Avenue
- October 6: CSI: Crime Scene Investigation season 13 on Fox TV Philippines
- October 7: Gossip Girl season 4, Nikita season 2 and Smallville season 9 on Fox TV Philippines
- October 8: 90210 season 4, Covert Affairs (season 2), Hart of Dixie season 1 and One Tree Hill season 7 on Fox TV Philippines
- October 9: The Loud House (season 1) on Yey!
- October 10: Supergirl season 3 on ETC and Jack TV
- October 11: The Flash season 4 on ETC and Jack TV
- October 12: Asia's Got Talent season 2 on AXN Asia
- October 13: Arrow season 6 on 2nd Avenue and Jack TV
- October 16: Blancpain GT Series Asia on AksyonTV
- October 20: The Good Place (season 2) on ETC
- October 23: Anti-Magic Academy: The 35th Test Platoon on Hero
- October 23: Carrossel on Telenovela Channel
- October 27: Rev on ANC
- October 27: Style Factory on ETC
- October 27: Tabi Po (season 2) on Sari-Sari Channel
- October 28: DiscoverEats (season 1) on Colours
- October 30: KonoSuba season 2 on Hero
- November 4: Mr Selfridge (season 3) on CT
- November 4: Mr. Robot (season 1) on Jack TV
- November 5: Magandang Gabi Pilipinas with Ceasar Soriano on Inquirer 990 Television
- November 6: DC's Legends of Tomorrow (season 2) on Jack TV
- November 7: Doctor Foster (season 1) on 2nd Avenue
- November 7: CSI: Crime Scene Investigation season 14 on Fox TV Philippines
- November 7: People of Earth (season 2) on Jack TV
- November 11: Game of Silence on CT
- November 12: Are You the One? season 4 on ETC
- November 12: Knife Fight (season 4) on 2nd Avenue
- November 13: Famous in Love on ETC
- November 13: Gotham season 3 on Jack TV
- November 19: Now Showing on GMA News TV
- November 22: This Is Us season 2 on 2nd Avenue
- November 23: Love Live! Sunshine!! (season 1) on Hero
- November 24: 100% Hotter on ETC
- November 25: Mr. Robot (season 2) on Jack TV
- November 26: Hell's Kitchen U.S. season 14 on 2nd Avenue
- November 26: English Premier League on S+A
- November 27: La Liga on S+A
- December 2: My Philippines on CNN Philippines
- December 7: CSI: Crime Scene Investigation season 15 on Fox TV Philippines
- December 9: Operation Break the Casanova's Heart on Sari-Sari Channel
- December 12: Black Work on 2nd Avenue
- December 18: Liar on 2nd Avenue
- December 20: Anohana: The Flower We Saw That Day on Hero
- December 23: Hero TV Tambayan on Hero

==== Re-runs ====
- January 2: Supernatural (seasons 1 to 7) on AksyonTV^{3}^{14}
- January 2: Born to be Wild, JejeMom and Rhodora X on Fox Filipino^{2}
- January 2: Annaliza and The Heirs on Jeepney TV^{1}
- January 2: The Master's Sun on GMA News TV^{2}
- January 2: The Adventures of Tom Sawyer on Yey!^{1}
- January 7: Arrow season 1 on AksyonTV^{3}^{12}^{13}
- January 9: Kapamilya, Deal or No Deal (season 5)^{1} and Pasión de Amor^{1}^{4} on Jeepney TV
- January 14: Bagito on Jeepney TV^{1}
- January 22: Galema: Anak ni Zuma on Jeepney TV^{1}
- January 23: Full House on GMA News TV^{2}
- January 23: May Bukas Pa (2009) on Jeepney TV^{1}
- January 30: My Girl (2005) on Jeepney TV^{1}
- January 31: Naruto: Shippuden season 2 on Yey!^{1}^{10}
- February 6: My Destiny on Fox Filipino^{2}
- February 6: Prime Minister and I on GMA News TV^{2}
- February 6: Wako Wako on Yey!^{1}
- February 13: Banana Split, Forevermore and Pure Love (2014) on Jeepney TV^{1}
- February 27: Winter Sonata on Jeepney TV^{2}
- March 6: Lobo on Jeepney TV^{1}
- March 13: Kambal Sirena and Magic Palayok on Fox Filipino^{2}
- March 13: Fall in Love with Me on GMA News TV^{2}
- March 13: Power Rangers Dino Thunder on Yey!^{1}^{10}
- March 15: Marcelino Pan y Vino on Yey!^{1}^{10}
- March 20: Leviathan: The Last Defense on Hero
- April 1: Temptation on GMA News TV^{2}
- April 5: Mara Clara (2010) and WansapanaSummer on Jeepney TV^{1}
- April 10: Yu-Gi-Oh! Arc-V season 1 on Yey!^{10}
- April 17: Ang Dalawang Mrs. Real on Fox Filipino^{2}
- April 17: Fated to Love You (Korean version) on Jeepney TV^{1}
- April 18: Kuroko's Basketball season 3 on Hero^{1}
- April 19: Captain Earth on Hero
- April 20: Ouran High School Host Club on Hero
- April 21: Gourmet Girl Graffiti on Hero
- April 24: Haikyu!! season 1^{1}^{10} and Little Women II^{1} on Yey!
- May 1: All of Me and My Love Donna on Jeepney TV^{1}
- May 1: Biyahe ni Drew on Fox Filipino^{7}
- May 4: Kampanerang Kuba on Jeepney TV^{1}
- May 6: Juan dela Cruz on Jeepney TV^{1}
- May 15: Hiram na Alaala on Fox Filipino^{2}
- May 15: Reply 1997 on GMA News TV^{2}
- May 22: Miss Ripley on Jeepney TV^{1}
- May 22: Haikyu!! season 2 on Yey!^{10}
- May 23: Bodacious Space Pirates on Hero
- May 29: Love Live! School Idol Project on Hero
- May 29: Ningning on Jeepney TV^{1}
- June 3: Blade Man on Jeepney TV^{4}
- June 5: Two Mothers on GMA News TV^{2}
- June 5: Boys Over Flowers^{1}^{15}, Goin' Bulilit Classics (Year 5)^{1} and Palibhasa Lalake^{1} on Jeepney TV
- June 5: Agimat: Ang Mga Alamat ni Ramon Revilla on Yey!^{1}^{7}
- June 10: The Legal Wife on Jeepney TV^{1}
- June 12: Katipunan on Fox Filipino^{2}^{7}
- June 12: Yu-Gi-Oh! Zexal season 2 on Yey!^{10}
- June 14: Power Rangers Wild Force on Yey!^{1}^{10}
- June 16: Ilustrado on Fox Filipino^{2}^{7}
- June 19: Angel Eyes on Jeepney TV^{1}
- June 19: Charlotte on Yey!^{1}^{2}^{16}
- June 24: Nikita season 1 on AksyonTV^{3}^{11}
- June 26: Carmela on Fox Filipino^{2}
- June 26: Got to Believe and On the Wings of Love on Jeepney TV^{1}
- July 2: Yowamushi Pedal on Yey!^{10}
- July 3: Kaya ng Powers on Fox Filipino^{2}
- July 4: Playing House (season 1) on Lifestyle^{15}
- July 8/November 26: Oreca Battle on Hero^{2}
- July 8/July 24: My Girlfriend Is a Gumiho on Jeepney TV^{1}^{15}
- July 9: Kabuhayang Swak na Swak on Jeepney TV^{1}
- July 31: Genesis on Fox Filipino^{2}
- July 31: Unforgettable Love and You're My Home on Jeepney TV^{1}
- August 12: Let's Get Married and My Lovely Girl on Jeepney TV^{1}
- August 19: Little Big Shots on Yey!^{1}
- August 20: Dragon Collection on Hero^{2}
- August 21: Makapiling Kang Muli on Fox Filipino^{2}
- August 21: Cunning Single Lady on Jeepney TV
- August 28: Secret Hotel on GMA News TV^{2}
- August 31: Agua Bendita on Jeepney TV^{1}
- September 4: Dolce Amore and Magkaribal on Jeepney TV^{1}
- September 11: Tubig at Langis on Jeepney TV^{1}
- September 18: Aso ni San Roque on Fox Filipino^{2}
- September 18: It's Okay, That's Love and Pangako Sa 'Yo (2000)^{1} on Jeepney TV
- September 18: Samurai X on Yey!^{1}^{10}^{15}^{16}
- September 25: Princess Sarah (2007) on Jeepney TV^{1}
- September 30: DC's Legends of Tomorrow season 1 on 2nd Avenue^{12}
- October 1: Home Along Da Riles on Jeepney TV^{1}
- October 2: Legendary Women on GMA News TV^{2}
- October 2: Princess Sara (1985) on Yey!^{1}
- October 6: Haikyu!! (season 2) on Hero^{5}
- October 13: Yu-Gi-Oh! Arc-V (season 1) on Hero^{5}
- October 16: Emergency Couple and Two Wives (2014)^{1} on Jeepney TV
- October 21: Doctor Stranger on Jeepney TV^{4}
- October 22: Power Rangers S.P.D. on Yey!^{1}^{10}
- October 23: Love & Lies on Fox Filipino^{2}
- October 23: Kokey on Jeepney TV^{1}^{5}
- October 24: Naruto: Shippuden season 8 on Hero^{1}
- October 28: The Mermaid on GMA News TV^{2}
- October 30: Lucifer (season 1) on 2nd Avenue^{12}
- October 30: Odd Mom Out (season 1) on Lifestyle^{11}
- November 5: Lethal Weapon (season 1) on Cine Mo!^{1}
- November 6: Ang Utol Kong Hoodlum and Kidlat on AksyonTV^{3}
- November 6: Futbolilits and Machete on Fox Filipino^{2}
- November 7: Class 3-C Has a Secret on Fox Filipino^{9}
- November 8: Ang Kwarto sa may Hagdanan on Fox Filipino^{9}
- November 12: Obsession on AksyonTV^{3}
- November 19: Blood on Cine Mo!^{8}
- November 27: Iglot and Pilyang Kerubin on Fox Filipino^{2}
- November 27: Sensory Couple on Jeepney TV^{4}
- November 27: Marco on Yey!^{2}^{16}
- December 4: Give Love on Christmas, Kambal sa Uma and Mga Anghel na Walang Langit on Jeepney TV^{1}
- December 9: Hi! School: Love On on GMA News TV^{2}
- December 11: Nathaniel and Walang Hanggan on Jeepney TV^{1}
- December 11: Girl Detective on GMA News TV^{2}
- December 18: All My Life on Fox Filipino^{2}
- December 18: Birth of a Beauty on GMA News TV^{2}
- December 25: The K2 on Jeepney TV^{4}
- Notes
1. ^ ^{a} Originally aired on ABS-CBN
2. ^ ^{b} Originally aired on GMA
3. ^ ^{c} Originally aired on TV5
4. ^ ^{d} Originally aired on Cine Mo!
5. ^ ^{e} Originally aired on Yey!
6. ^ ^{f} Originally aired on S+A
7. ^ ^{g} Originally aired on GMA News TV
8. ^ ^{h} Originally aired on Jeepney TV
9. ^ ^{i} Originally aired on Sari-Sari Channel
10. ^ ^{j} Originally aired on Hero
11. ^ ^{k} Originally aired on ETC
12. ^ ^{l} Originally aired on Jack TV
13. ^ ^{m} Originally aired on 2nd Avenue
14. ^ ^{n} Originally aired on CT
15. ^ ^{o} Originally aired on Studio 23 (now S+A)
16. ^ ^{p} Originally aired on Q (now GMA News TV)
17. ^ ^{q} Originally aired on C/S 9 (now CNN Philippines)

=== Video Streaming Services ===
The following are programs that debuted on video streaming services:

- January 6: One Day at a Time on Netflix
- January 13: A Series of Unfortunate Events on Netflix
- January 28: Emerald City on Iflix
- January 30: Black Sails (season 4) on Iflix
- February 4: Santa Clarita Diet on Netflix
- February 24: Ultimate Beastmaster on Netflix
- March 17: Iron Fist on Netflix
- April 1: 13 Reasons Why on Netflix
- May 31: House of Cards season 5 on Netflix
- July 25: Midnight, Texas on Iflix
- July 29: Assassination Classroom season 1 on Iflix
- August 8: Umbra: Anino sa Dilim on iWantTV
- August 19: Marvel's The Defenders on Netflix
- September 21: The Good Place season 2 on Iflix
- September 28: Star (season 2) on Iflix
- October 12: Dynasty on Netflix
- October 28: Stranger Things season 2 on Netflix
- December 1: Hoy, Bibig Mo! on Iflix

== Returning or renamed programs ==
=== Major networks ===
Show	Last aired	Retitled as/Season/Notes	Channel	Return date
Supernatural	2016	Same (season 11)	TV5	January 23
Superbook Reimagined	2016	Same (season 3)	ABS-CBN	February 5
Henry Hugglemonster	2015	Same (season 2)	TV5	February 13
Vikings	2016	Same (season 3)	TV5	February 24
Arrow	2016	Same (season 3)	TV5	February 27
Agents of S.H.I.E.L.D.	2016	Same (season 2)	TV5	March 9
Philippine Basketball Association	2017 (season 42: "Philippine Cup")	Same (season 42: "Commissioner's Cup")	TV5 / PBA Rush	March 17
Pluma	2016	Same (season 2)	ABS-CBN	April 16
Asia's Next Top Model	2016	Same (season 5: "Cycle 5")	TV5	April 17
The Flash	2016	Same (season 2)	TV5	April 17
Wattpad Presents	2016	Same (season 3)	TV5	April 29
Bet on Your Baby	2015	Same (season 3)	ABS-CBN	May 13
Home Foodie	2016	Same (season 3)	GMA	May 15
Mulawin	2005	Mulawin vs. Ravena	GMA	May 22
The Walking Dead	2017	Same (season 4)	TV5	May 25
Celebrity Bluff	2016	Same (season 13)	GMA	June 3
Impostora	2008	Same (2017)	GMA	July 3
Knights of Sidonia	2017	Same (season 2: "Battle for Planet Nine")	TV5	July 5
Philippine Basketball Association	2017 (season 42: "Commissioner's Cup")	Same (season 42: "Governor's Cup")	TV5 / PBA Rush	July 19
Road Trip	2016 (GMA News TV / Light Network)	Same (3rd incarnation)	GMA	July 23
Avengers Assemble	2015	Same (season 2)	TV5	August 3
Ultraman	2014 (ABS-CBN / S+A / Hero; season 15: "Mebius") / 2016 (Yey!)	Same (season 17: "Ginga")	GMA	August 13
Alyas Robin Hood	2017	Same (season 2)	GMA	August 14
Supergirl	2017	Same (season 2)	TV5	August 29
NBA Sabados	2017	Same (2017–18 season)	ABS-CBN	October 21
One Piece	2014	Same (season 10)	GMA	October 23
Arrow	2017	Same (season 4)	TV5	October 23
Teenage Mutant Ninja Turtles	2016	Same (season 3)	ABS-CBN	October 29
Henry Hugglemonster	2017	Same (season 3)	TV5	November 6
Blindspot	2017	Same (season 2)	TV5	December 13
Philippine Basketball Association	2017 (season 42: "Governor's Cup")	Same (season 43: "Philippine Cup")	TV5 / PBA Rush	December 17

=== State-owned networks ===
Show	Last aired	Retitled as/Season/Notes	Channel	Return date
Healthline	2013 (IBC)	Same	PTV	January 8
BizNews	2015	Same	PTV	January 23
The Doctor is In	2016	Same (season 5)	PTV	February 19
Business and Beyond	2016	Same (season 2)	IBC	September 1
PTV News	2017	Same (3rd incarnation)	PTV	September 18
Damayan	2010 (NBN)	Damayan Ngayon	PTV	October 6
PTV Sports	2016	Same (2nd incarnation)	PTV	October 16

=== Minor networks ===
Show	Last aired	Retitled as/Season/Notes	Channel	Return date
D'X-Man	2017	Same	UNTV Public Service	August 22
UNTV Cup	2017	Same (season 6)	UNTV Public Service	September 12
Istorya	2016	Same	UNTV Public Service	September 23

=== Other channels ===
Show	Last aired	Retitled as/Season/Notes	Channel	Return date
Healing Galing (Sunday edition)	2016	Same	AksyonTV	January 1
American Dad!	2016	Same (season 13)	Jack TV	January 2
Aksyon Ngayon	2016	Lingkod Kapamilya sa DZMM	DZMM TeleRadyo	January 2
Bitten	2016	Same (season 2)	ETC on SBN	January 2
Punto Asintado	2016	Same	AksyonTV	January 2
Bitag Live	2016	Same	AksyonTV	January 2
Aksyon Solusyon	2016	Same	AksyonTV	January 2
Bones	2016	Same (season 12)	2nd Avenue on RJTV	January 4
Healthline with Cheryl Cosim	2016	Same	AksyonTV	January 4
Alagang Kapatid sa Radyo5	2016	Same	AksyonTV	January 5
Metro Sabado	2016	Same	AksyonTV	January 7
Love Idols	2011	Same	AksyonTV	January 7
The Biggest Loser USA	2016 (season 13: "No Excuses")	Same (season 14: "Challenge America")	2nd Avenue on RJTV	January 8
It's Always Sunny in Philadelphia	2016	Same (season 12)	Jack TV	January 10
PBA D-League	2016 (season 5: "Foundation Cup")	Same (season 5: "Aspirants' Cup")	AksyonTV / PBA Rush	January 20
Blood, Sweat & Heels	2016	Same (season 2)	ETC on SBN	February 4
UAAP Men's & Women's Volleyball	2016	Same (season 79)	S+A	February 4
UAAP Men's Football	2016	Same (season 79)	S+A	February 9
Reign	2016	Same (season 4)	ETC on SBN	February 11
Reliable Sources	2016	Same	CNN Philippines	February 13
The 100	2016	Same (season 4)	Jack TV	February 17
Philippine Super Liga	2016 (season 4: "Grand Prix Conference")	Same (season 5: "Invitational Cup")	AksyonTV / Hyper	March 4
Winners & Losers	2016	Same (season 5)	2nd Avenue on RJTV	March 6
Survivor	2016 (season 33: "Millennials vs. Gen X")	Same (season 34: "Game Changers")	Jack TV	March 9
The Originals	2016	Same (The Originals)	ETC on SBN	March 18
Blindspot	2017	Same (season 2)	2nd Avenue on RJTV	March 18
TalkAsia	2016	Same	CNN Philippines	March 19
The Biggest Loser USA	2017: (season 14: "Challenge America")	Same (season 15: "Second Chances 2")	2nd Avenue on RJTV	April 2
Are You the One?	2016	Same (season 2)	ETC on SBN	April 2
Asia's Next Top Model	2016	Same (season 5: "Cycle 5")	Star World	April 5
Metal Fight Beyblade	2016	Same (season 3: "4D")	Yey!	April 8
NCIS	2015	Same (season 12)	CT	April 10
Gotham	2016	Same (season 2)	Jack TV	April 14
Bandila	2011	Same	DZMM TeleRadyo	April 17
Team Yey!	2017	Same (season 2)	Yey!	April 17
Madam Secretary	2016	Same (season 3)	2nd Avenue on RJTV	April 18
iZombie	2016	Same (season 3)	ETC on SBN	April 19
Dobol B sa News TV	2012	Same (Saksi sa Dobol B, Super Balita sa Umaga Nationwide and Dobol A sa Dobol B programs)	GMA News TV	April 24
Project Runway	2016	Same (season 15)	ETC on SBN	April 27
Shakey's V-League	2016 (season 13: "Reinforced Open Conference")	Same (season 14: "Reinforced Conference")	S+A	April 30
Philippine Super Liga	2017 (season 5: "Invitational Cup")	Same (season 5: "Beach Volleyball Challenge Cup")	AksyonTV / Hyper	May 4
You're the Worst	2016	Same (season 3)	Jack TV	May 6
The Odd Couple	2015 (CT)	Same (season 2)	Jack TV	May 6
HitRecord on TV	2017	Same (season 2)	Jack TV	May 7
Bitten	2017	Same (season 3)	ETC on SBN	May 8
Women's National Basketball Association	2016	Same (2017 season)	S+A / Basketball TV / NBA Premium TV	May 14
Project Runway: All Stars	2016	Same (season 5)	ETC on SBN	May 18
Hungry with Chef JP	2016	Same (all-new episodes)	CNN Philippines	May 20
PBA D-League	2017 (season 6: "Aspirants' Cup")	Same (season 6: "Foundation Cup")	AksyonTV / PBA Rush	May 26
Jamie & Jimmy's Food Fight Club	2017	Same (season 2)	2nd Avenue on RJTV	May 28
Philippine Super Liga	2017 (season 5: "Beach Volleyball Challenge Cup")	Same (season 5: "All-Filipino Conference")	AksyonTV / Hyper	June 3
Skin Wars	2016	Same (season 2)	Jack TV	June 4
Playing House	2015 (2nd Avenue)	Same (season 2)	ETC on SBN	June 5
The Americans	2016	Same (season 5)	CT	June 10
Knife Fight	2015	Same (season 3)	2nd Avenue on RJTV	June 11
The Biggest Loser	2017 (season 15: "Second Chances 2")	Same (season 16: "Glory Days")	2nd Avenue on RJTV	June 11
Project Runway: Junior	2016	Same (season 3)	ETC on SBN	June 22
The Strain	2015	Same (season 3)	CT	July 1
Are You the One?	2017	Same (season 3)	ETC on SBN	July 1
Premier Volleyball League	2017 (season 14: "Reinforced Conference")	Same (season 14: "Open Conference")	S+A	July 1
Brew Dogs	2015	Same (season 3)	Jack TV	July 2
Best Bars in America	2015 (CT)	Same (season 2)	Jack TV	July 2
National Collegiate Athletic Association	2016	Same (season 93)	S+A	July 8
Teenage Mutant Ninja Turtles	2015	Same (season 3)	Yey!	July 8
Mismo	2017	Showbuzz	DZMM TeleRadyo	July 10
Suits	2016	Same (season 7)	2nd Avenue on RJTV / Diva / Jack TV	July 13
Motive	2015	Same (season 3)	CT	July 15
Autopsy: The Last Hours of...	2017	Same (season 2)	CT	July 22
MasterChef U.S.	2016	Same (season 8)	Lifestyle	August 3
Autopsy: The Last Hours of...	2017	Same (season 3)	CT	August 5
Hell's Kitchen U.S.	2012	Same (season 13)	2nd Avenue on RJTV	August 6
Girlfriends' Guide to Divorce	2015 (2nd Avenue)	Same (season 2)	ETC on SBN	August 7
The Expandables	2017	Same (season 2)	ETC on SBN	August 27
DISHkarte of the Day	2016	Same (season 2)	GMA News TV	August 28
Autopsy: The Last Hours of...	2017	Same (season 4)	CT	September 2
Premier Volleyball League	2017 (season 14: "Open Conference")	Same (season 14: "Collegiate Conference")	S+A	September 2
The Ellen DeGeneres Show	2017	Same (season 15)	2nd Avenue on RJTV	September 6
University Athletic Association of the Philippines	2016	Same (season 80)	S+A	September 9
Car Matchmaker	2016 (CT)	Same (season 3)	Jack TV	September 17
Doowee Hooper Beat Band Competition	2016	Same (season 4)	S+A	September 17
Strawberry Shortcake's Berry Bitty Adventures	2017	Same (season 2)	Yey!	September 25
The Big Bang Theory	2017	Same (season 11)	Jack TV	September 26
This Is Us	2017	Same (season 2)	Jack TV	September 26
Survivor	2017 (season 34: "Game Changers")	Same (season 35: "Survivor: Heroes vs. Healers vs. Hustlers")	Jack TV	September 28
Lucifer	2017	Same (season 3)	Jack TV	October 3
The Middle	2016	Same (season 9)	2nd Avenue on RJTV	October 4
DC's Legends of Tomorrow	2017	Same (season 2)	2nd Avenue on RJTV and Jack TV	October 6 (2nd Avenue); November 6 (Jack TV)
Supergirl	2017	Same (season 3)	ETC on SBN / Jack TV	October 10
The Flash	2017	Same (season 4)	ETC on SBN / Jack TV	October 11
Asia's Got Talent	2015	Same (season 2)	AXN Asia	October 12
Arrow	2017	Same (season 6)	2nd Avenue on RJTV / Jack TV	October 13
National Basketball Association	2017	Same (2017–18 season)	S+A / Basketball TV / NBA Premium TV	October 18
The Good Place	2017	Same (season 2)	ETC on SBN	October 20
Philippine Super Liga	2017 (season 5: "All-Filipino Conference")	Same (season 5: "Grand Prix Conference")	AksyonTV / Hyper	October 21
Mr Selfridge	2017	Same (season 3)	CT	November 4
People of Earth	2016	Same (season 2)	Jack TV	November 7
Are You the One?	2017	Same (season 4)	ETC on SBN	November 12
Knife Fight	2017	Same (season 4)	2nd Avenue on RJTV	November 12
Gotham	2017	Same (season 3)	Jack TV	November 13
This Is Us	2017	Same (season 2)	2nd Avenue on RJTV	November 22
Mr. Robot	2017	Same (season 2)	Jack TV	November 25
Hell's Kitchen U.S.	2017	Same (season 14)	2nd Avenue	November 26
La Liga	2013 (IBC)	Same (2017–18 season)	S+A	November 27
Shop TV	2016	Same	AksyonTV	December 4
UEFA Champions League	2015	Same (2017–18 season)	S+A	December 6

=== Video streaming services ===
Show	Last aired	Retitled as/Season/Notes	Service	Return date
The Good Place	2017	Same (season 2)	Iflix	September 21
Channel Zero	2016	Same (season 2: "The No-End House")	Iflix	September 21
Star	2016	Same (season 2)	Iflix	September 28

== Programs transferring networks ==
=== Major networks ===
Date	Show	No. of seasons	Moved from	Moved to
January 15	Winx Club	—N/a	ABS-CBN	TV5
January 15	Ultimate Spider-Man	—N/a	ABS-CBN	TV5
January 15	Oreca Battle	—N/a	Hero	GMA
March 21	Philippines' Next Top Model: High Street	—N/a	RPN (now CNN Philippines)	TV5
April 17	Timon & Pumbaa	—N/a	GMA	TV5
April 30	WWE SmackDown	—N/a	Fox Philippines	TV5 / Hyper
May 8	Boiling Points	—N/a	MTV Philippines (now AksyonTV)	TV5
May 13	Dragon Collection	—N/a	Hero	GMA
July 23	Thomas & Friends	—N/a	TV5 / Studio 23 / S+A / Yey!	GMA
July 23	Road Trip	—N/a	GMA News TV / Light Network	GMA
August 13	Ultraman	17	ABS-CBN / S+A / Hero / Yey!	GMA
September 10	Bakbakan Na	—N/a	IBC	TV5
October 1	Tukaan	—N/a	IBC	TV5

=== State-owned networks ===
Date	Show	No. of seasons	Moved from	Moved to
January 8	Healthline	—N/a	IBC	PTV
January 23	Kilos Pronto	—N/a	UNTV Public Service	PTV
August 15	Bitag Live	—N/a	AksyonTV	PTV

=== Other channels ===
Date	Show	No. of seasons	Moved from	Moved to
January 1	Panahon.TV	—N/a	PTV	Great Commission Television (GCTV) / Pilipinas HD on BEAM TV
February 10	Gillette World Sport	—N/a	Solar Sports	S+A
March 2	Mobil 1 The Grid	—N/a	Solar Sports	S+A
March 11	ChinoyTV	—N/a	PTV	ANC
March 27	Strawberry Shortcake's Berry Bitty Adventures	—N/a	9TV (now CNN Philippines)	Yey!
April 3	Mr Selfridge	2	My Movie Channel (now defunct)	CT
April 5	Prison Break	—N/a	C/S 9 (now CNN Philippines)	2nd Avenue
May 6	The Odd Couple	2	CT	Jack TV
June 5	Playing House	2	2nd Avenue	ETC
July 2	Best Bars in America	2	CT	Jack TV
July 8	Teenage Mutant Ninja Turtles (2012)	3	ABS-CBN	Yey!
August 7	Girlfriends' Guide to Divorce	2	2nd Avenue	ETC
September 2	Thunderbird Sabong Nation	—N/a	IBC	S+A
September 17	Car Matchmaker	3	CT	Jack TV
September 18	Sesame Street	—N/a	Yey!	Knowledge Channel
September 18	Samurai X	—N/a	ABS-CBN / Studio 23 (now S+A) / Q (now GMA News TV) / Hero	Yey!
September 30	DC's Legends of Tomorrow	1	Jack TV	2nd Avenue
October 10	The Tonight Show Starring Jimmy Fallon	—N/a	CT	Jack TV
October 15	Philippine Star's Wheels TV	—N/a	S+A	Bloomberg TV Philippines
November 5	Lethal Weapon	1	ABS-CBN	Cine Mo!
November 27	Marco	—N/a	GMA / Q (now GMA News TV)	Yey!
November 27	La Liga	87	AKTV on IBC (now defunct)	S+A
December 12	Black Work	—N/a	CT	2nd Avenue

== Milestone episodes ==
The following shows made their Milestone episodes in 2017:

Show	Network	Episode #	Episode title	Episode air date
Till I Met You	ABS-CBN	100th	"In Your Face"	January 13
Magandang Buhay	ABS-CBN	200th	"Maganda ang Buhay Kung Ang Bawat Desisyon, Paninindigan!"	January 18
The Greatest Love	ABS-CBN	100th	"Against All Odds"	January 20
Sa Piling ni Nanay	GMA	150th	"Kapit Lang, Ysabel"	January 23
FPJ's Ang Probinsyano	ABS-CBN	350th	"Sumbong"	February 1
Tonight with Boy Abunda	ABS-CBN	350th	"Patti Austin Interview"	February 1
Alyas Robin Hood	GMA	100th	"Sorry Sarri"	February 3
Encantadia	GMA	150th	"Avisala, Luna"	February 10
Mukha	ANC	150th	"Disenyo"	February 15
Wowowin	GMA	300th	"#Wowowin"	February 17
Reaksyon	TV5	1,100th	"Interview with Presidential Son Baste Duterte"	March 2
Gandang Gabi Vice	ABS-CBN	300th	"GGV Can Do That"	March 5
Trops	GMA	100th	"100th episode"	March 10
Karelasyon	GMA	100th	"She Maid It"	March 18
Family Feud	ABS-CBN	100th	"100th Game"	March 19
Winners & Losers	2nd Avenue on RJTV	100th	"When the Wheels Come Off"	March 27
Magandang Buhay	ABS-CBN	250th	"Maganda ang Buhay Ngayong Tag-Araw, Kasama Ang Pamilya!"	March 30
The Greatest Love	ABS-CBN	150th	"Beginning of The End"	March 31
FPJ's Ang Probinsyano	ABS-CBN	400th	"Kalbaryo"	April 12
Tonight with Boy Abunda	ABS-CBN	400th	"Diego Loyzaga Interview"	April 12
Langit Lupa	ABS-CBN	100th	"Morality Bites"	April 18
Ika-6 na Utos	GMA	100th	"Buking"	April 21
Encantadia	GMA	200th	"Taktika"	April 25
Trops	GMA	150th	"150th episode"	May 2
Wowowin	GMA	350th	"#Wowowin"	May 23
A Love to Last	ABS-CBN	100th	"Meltdown"	May 30
Meant to Be	GMA	100th	"Pusuan Na 'Yan"	May 30
Ipaglaban Mo!	ABS-CBN	150th	"Dukot"	June 10
My Dear Heart	ABS-CBN	100th	"Pagsundo"	June 13
Magandang Buhay	ABS-CBN	300th	"Dahil sa Pagmamahal ni Popshie, Siguradong may Magandang Buhay"	June 16
Healing Galing	TV5	150th	"Special Father's Day"	June 18
Ika-6 na Utos	GMA	150th	"Bagong Hamon"	June 20
FPJ's Ang Probinsyano	ABS-CBN	450th	"Pasimuno"	June 23
Tonight with Boy Abunda	ABS-CBN	450th	"Sarah Lahbati and Shara Chavez Interview"	June 23
The Tonight Show Starring Jimmy Fallon	CT	700th	"Pharrell Williams/Chris Coffer/Vince Staples"	June 27
The Better Half	ABS-CBN	100th	"Kapatawaran"	July 4
Wildflower	ABS-CBN	100th	"Salba"	July 4
Sunday PinaSaya	GMA	100th	"Puso ng Saya"	July 9
Wowowin	GMA	400th	"#Wowowin"	July 11
Pepito Manaloto	GMA	250th	"Mukhang Malas"	July 15
Reaksyon	TV5	1,200th	"Kumusta nga ba ang ikalawang SONA ni Presidente Duterte?"	July 24
Wansapanataym	ABS-CBN	750th	"#WansaAVBullies"	July 30
Trops	GMA	200th	"200th episode"	August 1
A Love to Last	ABS-CBN	150th	"Stolen Moment"	August 8
Sarap Diva	GMA	250th	"Food Trip"	August 12
Ika-6 na Utos	GMA	200th	"Paglubog"	August 16
Magandang Buhay	ABS-CBN	350th	"Pag Naging Daan Ka Sa Tagumpay ng Iba, Dala Nito Para sa Lahat ay Magandang Buhay!"	August 25
FPJ's Ang Probinsyano	ABS-CBN	500th	"Naiinggit"	September 1
Tonight with Boy Abunda	ABS-CBN	500th	"Noven Belleza Exclusive"	September 1
Pusong Ligaw	ABS-CBN	100th	"Lihim"	September 11
Wildflower	ABS-CBN	150th	"Huli"	September 13
Ikaw Lang ang Iibigin	ABS-CBN	100th	"Taguan"	September 15
Wowowin	GMA	450th	"#Wowowin"	September 20
It's Showtime	ABS-CBN	2,500th	"SeptemVerySpecial"	September 21
Eat Bulaga!	GMA	11,500th	"11,500th episode"	September 21
Magpakailanman	GMA	250th	"Beki Ka, Tibo Ako, Forever Tayo (The Genimi Naraga and Myen Oronan Story)"	September 23
i-Witness	GMA	1,000th	"Oplan Pokémon"	September 23
Alyas Robin Hood	GMA	150th	"Buwis Buhay"	September 29
Failon Ngayon	ABS-CBN	400th	"400th Episode"	September 30
Reaksyon	TV5	1,250th	"Former Ateneo School of Government Atty. Tony La Viña Interview"	October 2
Tulong Mo, Pasa Ko	TV5	100th	"100th episode"	October 6
Banana Sundae	ABS-CBN	100th	"100 Scoops"	October 8
Ika-6 na Utos	GMA	250th	"Paglalapit ng Loob"	October 13
Magandang Buhay	ABS-CBN	400th	"Dahil Malupit ang Idol Kong si Kuya, Lahat Tayo'y May... Magandang Buhay!"	October 20
Bubble Gang	GMA	1,100th	"1100th Episode"	October 27
La Luna Sangre	ABS-CBN	100th	"Flatline"	November 3
The Ellen DeGeneres Show	2nd Avenue	2,500th	"2,500th show"	November 10
FPJ's Ang Probinsyano	ABS-CBN	550th	"Suportado"	November 10
Tonight with Boy Abunda	ABS-CBN	550th	"Karen Ibasco Interview"	November 10
Impostora	GMA	100th	"Bagong Plano"	November 17
Home Sweetie Home	ABS-CBN	200th	"200th episode"	November 18
Pusong Ligaw	ABS-CBN	150th	"Exposed"	November 20
Wildflower	ABS-CBN	200th	"Paninigil"	November 22
Ikaw Lang ang Iibigin	ABS-CBN	150th	"Pangako"	November 24
Haplos	GMA	100th	"Singsing"	November 24
Goin' Bulilit	ABS-CBN	600th	"Tiangge Episode"	November 26
Wowowin	GMA	500th	"#Wowowin"	November 29
iBilib	GMA	300th	"300th Episode"	December 3
The Middle	2nd Avenue	200th	"The 200th"	December 6
Ika-6 na Utos	GMA	300th	"Sanib Pwersa"	December 11
Magandang Buhay	ABS-CBN	450th	"Makaluma Man o Makabagong Tradisyon, If We Will All Just Love This Christmas, Hatid Nito'y Magandang Buhay!"	December 25

== Finales ==
=== ABS-CBN ===
The following are programs that ended on ABS-CBN:

- January 1: Kapamilya Weekend Specials
- January 6: Magpahanggang Wakas
- January 20: Till I Met You
- January 29: Oyayi (season 1)
- February 10: Doble Kara and Pinoy Big Brother: Lucky Season 7 – Mga Kwento ng Dream Team ni Kuya
- March 5: Pinoy Big Brother: Lucky Season 7
- March 26: Avatar: The Legend of Aang season 3 (rerun)
- April 9: Your Face Sounds Familiar Kids season 1
- April 21: The Greatest Love
- April 28: Langit Lupa
- May 5: Love in the Moonlight and Minute to Win It – Last Man Standing
- May 7: Family Feud (3rd incarnation)
- June 4: I Can Do That
- June 16: My Dear Heart
- July 7: Goblin
- July 9: Pluma (season 2)
- July 14: Legend of the Blue Sea
- July 30: The Voice Teens season 1
- September 1: Weightlifting Fairy
- September 2: G Diaries (season 1)
- September 8: The Better Half
- September 9: Lethal Weapon (season 1) and Mga Kwento ni Marc Logan
- September 10: Bet on Your Baby (season 3)
- September 22: A Love to Last and Love in the Moonlight (rerun)
- October 14: MathDali
- October 22: The Legend of Korra (seasons 3 and 4)
- October 27: Legend of the Blue Sea (rerun)
- November 10: My Dearest Intruder
- November 24: The Promise of Forever
- December 30: Arangkada (ABS-CBN TV-2 Cagayan de Oro)
- December 31: Little Big Shots

==== Stopped airing ====
- December 3: Kapamilya Mega Blockbusters (Reason: pre-empted by UAAP)
- December 16–17: I Can See Your Voice (Reason: pre-empted by Just Love: The ABS-CBN Christmas Special 2017)
- December 18–22: ABS-CBN News and Current Affairs (replay) (Reason: pre-empted by Kapamilya Simbang Gabi 2017)
- December 31: Gandang Gabi, Vice! (Reason: pre-empted by Paglalayag Minamahal: The ABS-CBN News 2017 Yearender and Salubong 2018: The ABS-CBN New Year Countdown)

=== GMA ===
The following are programs that ended on GMA Network:

- January 6: Someone to Watch Over Me
- January 8: Pac-Man and the Ghostly Adventures (season 2)
- January 13: Pokémon XY: The Series (season 17; re-run)
- January 20: Heart of Asia Presents (Year 2)
- January 21: Bakugan: Gundalian Invaders
- January 26: Codename: Yong Pal
- January 27: Sa Piling ni Nanay
- February 4: Wonderballs
- February 11: #LIKE and Kapuso Movie Night
- February 13: Mako Mermaids (rerun)
- February 17: Hahamakin ang Lahat
- February 24: Alyas Robin Hood season 1
- March 3: The Big One
- March 23: Pretty Woman
- March 24: Pokémon XY: Kalos Quest (season 18) and Wolfblood (season 1)
- March 25: Case Solved
- April 12: Alien Surf Girls and Pinulot Ka Lang sa Lupa
- April 16: People vs. the Stars
- April 23: Tsuperhero
- April 28: Moribito: Guardian of the Spirit
- May 6: My Little Pony: Friendship Is Magic (season 1)
- May 13: Karelasyon
- May 19: Encantadia and Voltes V (dub reboot)
- May 26: Destined to be Yours
- May 27: Full House Tonight
- June 2: Aliados
- June 8: Scarlet Heart
- June 16: Street Fighter: Assassin's Fist
- June 23: Meant to Be
- June 30: Legally Blind
- July 7: D' Originals
- July 16: Follow Your Heart and Kapuso Sine Klasika
- July 21: Ice Fantasy and Moribito II: The Anguish of the Destroyers
- July 23: Majin Bone
- August 5: One Piece (season 3) (rerun)
- August 8: Innocent Defendant
- August 11: My Love from the Star
- August 18: Home Foodie (season 3) and I Heart Davao
- August 25: 24 Oras Davao (GMA Davao)
- August 27: Hay, Bahay!
- September 15: Mirror of the Witch and Mulawin vs. Ravena
- September 16: Rowdy Sumo Wrestler Matsutaro
- September 22: All About My Mom and Trops
- September 23: Virtua Fighter (rerun)
- September 29: Bleach (season 6) (rerun) and Sonic X (rerun)
- October 3: Saimdang: Soulmates Across Time
- October 20: Slam Dunk (rerun)
- October 21: G.R.I.N.D. Get Ready It's a New Day
- October 28: The Global Filipino
- November 11: Dragon Collection
- November 12: Oreca Battle
- November 17: Let's Fight Ghost! and My Daughter, Geum Sa-weol
- November 23: Strong Girl Bong-soon
- November 24: Alyas Robin Hood season 2
- November 26: Adyenda
- December 1: Daimos (2017 dub reboot)
- December 21: My Secret Romance
- December 29: Starry Night, Starry Sea

==== Unknown ====
- PJM Forum

==== Stopped airing ====
- July 2: Sunday PinaSaya (Reason: pre-empted by Pacquiao vs. Horn)
- November 18: True Horror Stories (rerun) (Reason: pre-empted by Miss World 2017 and I-Witness Sunday timeslot)
- December 17: Daig Kayo ng Lola Ko and Bossing & Ai (Reason: pre-empted by Paskong Kapuso: The GMA Christmas Special 2017)
- December 21: EZ Shop (reason: Program continued to air on GMA News TV.)
- December 31: All-Star Videoke and Bossing & Ai (Reason: pre-empted by 2018 GMA New Year Countdown: Buong Puso Para sa Kapuso as part of SNBO block)

=== TV5 ===
The following are programs that ended on TV5:

- January 5: La Reina del Sur
- January 6: Doc McStuffins (season 2) and Inspector Gadget (2015)
- January 8: Bugging Out
- January 13: America's Funniest Home Videos
- January 19: The Vampire Diaries season 2
- January 21: Ex on the Beach and Catfish
- January 29: Manny Pacquiao Presents: Blow by Blow and UFC Vault
- February 4: Kakaibang Lunas
- February 10: Randy Cunningham: 9th Grade Ninja (season 2)
- February 23: Supernatural (seasons 9 to 11)
- February 24: Mr. Bean: The Animated Series and The Looney Tunes Show (rerun)
- February 28: Nikita season 1
- March 9: Teen Wolf (seasons 4 &nd 5)
- March 13: Arrow season 3
- April 10: KanColle: Kantai Collection
- April 12: Henry Hugglemonster (season 2) and Myriad Colors Phantom World
- April 23: Third Eye (rerun)
- April 25: Scandal season 2
- May 5: Disaster Date, Krypto the Superdog (rerun) and Vikings season 3
- May 7: Attack on Titan: Junior High and Star Wars Rebels (rerun)
- May 30: Philippines' Next Top Model: High Street
- June 2: Mickey Mouse Clubhouse (rerun) and Timon & Pumbaa
- June 3: Higglytown Heroes (rerun) and Wander Over Yonder
- June 17: Smallville season 2 (rerun)
- June 28: Knights of Sidonia
- June 30: Boiling Points
- July 2: Hulk and the Agents of S.M.A.S.H. (rerun) and Ultimate Spider-Man
- July 7: Inspector Gadget (2015; rerun)
- July 9: Lakbai
- July 23: FIBA World Basketball
- July 27: Norn9
- July 28: The Jungle Bunch to the Rescue (rerun)
- July 29: Wattpad Presents (season 3)
- July 30: Penn Zero: Part-Time Hero and Brillante Mendoza Presents
- July 31: Asia's Next Top Model cycle 5
- August 8: Supergirl season 1
- August 12: Be Cool, Scooby-Doo!
- August 25: Bunnicula
- August 30: Knights of Sidonia: Battle for Planet Nine
- September 1: Hi-5 Philippines (rerun)
- September 3: The 7D
- September 4: Is It Wrong to Try to Pick Up Girls in a Dungeon? and Voltron: Legendary Defender
- September 7: Marvel's Agents of S.H.I.E.L.D. season 2
- September 14: Prison Break season 1
- September 15: Doc McStuffins (rerun)
- September 18: The Flash season 2
- September 19: Quantico season 1
- October 7: The Best of PSL
- November 3: Aksyon sa Umaga and Reaksyon
- November 10: Scorpion (season 1)
- November 12: Turning Point
- November 20: Tulong Ko, Pasa Mo
- November 26: Japan Japan 47
- December 6: Blindspot (season 1)
- December 15: Oddbods
- December 30: Angelo Rules and Coke Studio Philippines (season 1)
- December 31: Winx Club

==== Stopped airing ====
- August 14: The Tom and Jerry Show (rerun) (reason: series break)
- August 31: Avengers Assemble (season 2)
- September 1: Wabbit (reason: one week only)
- September 3: The Powerpuff Girls (2016) and We Bare Bears (reason: Pulled out to give way new programming lineup of sports, original English audio rerun transferred to CNN Philippines on September 1, 2018)
- November 17: Doc McStuffins (rerun) and Henry Hugglemonster (season 3) (reason: accommodating for ESPN College Basketball)

=== PTV ===
The following are programs that ended on People's Television Network:

- March 5: ChinoyTV
- May 5: Good Morning Pilipinas (2nd incarnation)
- June 2: RadyoBisyon
- July 9: PTV News (2nd incarnation)
- September 15: Ulat Bayan (weekday edition)

=== IBC ===
The following are programs that ended on IBC:

- June 2: RadyoBisyon
- August 19: An Evening with Raoul
- August 26: Thunderbird Sabong Nation
- September 2: Tukaan

=== Minor networks ===
The following are programs that ended on minor networks:

- January 20: Kilos Pronto on UNTV Public Service
- May 6: Tara Lets! on CLTV 36
- September 1: Masayang Umaga Po! on Net 25
- October 20: Hataw Balita on UNTV
- November 23: Adyenda on Light Network

==== Unknown dates ====
- Arangkada sa Umaga, Balen, Belly Good, Biz Mode, Ing Balen, Metro Central Luzon Tonite, Metro Central Luzon Weekend Recap and Pasada Ala-Una on CLTV 36
- Buhay Unleash, I Love Pinas, OrganiqueTV, Prayer for the Nation, Sarap Pinoy and Shout Out: Sigaw ng Kabataan! on Light Network

==== Stopped airing ====
- January 6: Balen at Balita on CLTV 36
- July 2: D'X-Man on UNTV Public Service

=== Other channels ===
The following are programs that ended on other channels:

- January 5: Chicago P.D. (season 3) on CT
- January 6: Nathaniel and Pilipinas, Game Ka Na Ba? on Jeepney TV
- January 7: Lastikman (rerun) on Jeepney TV
- January 8: Four Weddings (season 2) and The Journey to the Crown on ETC
- January 9: Crowded on 2nd Avenue
- January 13: Ikaw ay Pag-Ibig (rerun) on Jeepney TV
- January 13: The Tempest on Telenovela Channel
- January 15: Dyesebel on Jeepney TV
- January 17: This Life (season 1) on 2nd Avenue
- January 18: Huwag Ka Lang Mawawala on Jeepney TV
- January 19: Empress Ki on GMA News TV
- January 20: The Good Place (season 1) on ETC
- January 20: Dream Dad on Jeepney TV
- January 21: Blindspot (season 1) on 2nd Avenue
- January 21: Underemployed on ETC
- January 23: Undateable (season 3) on Jack TV
- January 24: CSI: Crime Scene Investigation season 4 on Fox TV Philippines
- January 26: Haikyu!! season 2 on Hero
- January 27: Pure Genius on 2nd Avenue
- January 27: Serbisyo All Access on CNN Philippines
- January 27: Cheongdam-dong Alice on Jeepney TV
- January 30: Naruto: Shippuden (season 1) on Yey!
- February 3: Rhodora X on Fox Filipino
- February 3: The Master's Sun on GMA News TV
- February 4: Extant (season 2) on 2nd Avenue
- February 12: Save with Jamie on 2nd Avenue
- February 13: JejeMom on Fox Filipino
- February 16: Project Runway season 14 on ETC
- February 16: The Heirs (rerun) on Jeepney TV
- February 20: Bitten (season 2) on ETC
- February 24: Mornings @ ANC on ANC
- February 24: News.PH on CNN Philippines
- February 24: My Girl (2005; rerun) on Jeepney TV
- February 26: Halfworlds (season 2) on HBO Asia
- February 27: CSI: Crime Scene Investigation season 5 on Fox TV Philippines
- March 2: Suits season 6 on 2nd Avenue and Jack TV
- March 5: Doctor Stranger on Cine Mo!
- March 5: Good Doctor on Jeepney TV
- March 9: America's Next Top Model (cycle 23) on ETC
- March 10: My Destiny on Fox Filipino
- March 10: Prime Minister and I on GMA News TV
- March 11: The Vampire Diaries (season 8) on ETC
- March 14: It's Always Sunny in Philadelphia (season 12) on Jack TV
- March 14: The Adventures of Tom Sawyer on Yey!
- March 15: This Is Us (season 1) on 2nd Avenue
- March 15: Nobunagun on Hero
- March 16: Star (season 1) on ETC
- March 16: Motorcycle Diaries on GMA News TV
- March 17: Samurai X on Hero
- March 18: Blood, Sweat & Heels (season 2) on ETC
- March 23: Friends to Lovers? on ETC
- March 23: Cunning Single Lady on Jeepney TV
- March 24: CNN Philippines Network News on CNN Philippines
- March 24: Full House on GMA News TV
- March 24: Life of Lies on Telenovela Channel
- March 26: The Biggest Loser USA season 14: Challenge America on 2nd Avenue
- March 26: CNN Philippines Network News Weekend on CNN Philippines
- March 26: Secret Love on GMA News TV
- March 26: America's Got Talent (season 11) on RTL CBS Entertainment
- March 26: UNTV Cup (season 5) on UNTV Public Service
- March 27: Time After Time on Jack TV
- March 29: Bones season 12 on 2nd Avenue
- March 29: Yu-Gi-Oh! Arc-V season 1 on Hero
- March 30: Legion season 1 on Fox Asia
- March 31: Asian Horror Stories on GMA News TV
- March 31: Cebuano News and Kapampangan News on CNN Philippines
- March 31: CSI: Crime Scene Investigation season 6 on Fox TV Philippines
- April 2: Jamie & Jimmy's Food Fight Club (season 1) on 2nd Avenue
- April 3: Hindsight on ETC
- April 4: Forevermore on Jeepney TV
- April 4: Wako Wako on Yey!
- April 5: New Girl season 6 on ETC
- April 7: Mr Selfridge (season 2) on CT (now defunct)
- April 7: Magic Palayok on Fox Filipino
- April 7: Winter Sonata (rerun) on Jeepney TV
- April 7: Inazuma Eleven GO and Naruto: Shippuden season 2 on Yey!
- April 8: Martina Cole's The Runaway on CT (now defunct)
- April 8: Under the Dome season 1 on Fox TV Philippines
- April 13: Kambal Sirena on Fox Filipino
- April 15: Your Face Sounds Familiar Kids season 1 on Yey!
- April 15: Harvest on CNN Philippines
- April 16: Funny Ka, Pare Ko (season 3) on Cine Mo!
- April 16: Team Yey! (season 1) on Yey!
- April 17: Kuroko's Basketball season 2 (rerun) on Hero
- April 18: NCIS season 12 on CT
- April 18: 2 Broke Girls season 6 on ETC
- April 18: 24: Legacy on Fox Asia
- April 18: Majestic Prince on Hero
- April 19' Ixion Saga DT (rerun) n Hero
- April 20: Beautiful Bones: Sakurako's Investigation and Dragon Crisis! on Hero
- April 21: Born to Be Wild (old episodes), Front Row (old episodes) and Takilya Blockbusters on GMA News TV
- April 21: What Life Took from Me on Telenovela Channel
- April 21: Marcelino Pan y Vino on Yey!
- April 23: ABS-CBN Sports presents Top Rank Boxing on S+A
- April 24: Pure Love (2014) on Jeepney TV
- April 25: APB on 2nd Avenue
- April 27: BrainDead on AXN Asia
- April 27: Fate/kaleid liner Prisma Illya on Hero
- April 27: Ina Kapatid Anak (rerun) and It's Okay, That's Love on Jeepney TV
- April 27: Action Movie Zone on S+A
- April 28: Lunch Blockbusters and FPJ: Kampeon ng Aksyon on S+A
- April 29: Dugong Buhay on Jeepney TV
- April 30: Sensory Couple on Cine Mo!
- April 30: Dates on ETC
- April 30: HitRecord on TV (season 1) on Jack TV
- May 5: Powerless on ETC and Jack TV
- May 5: No Tomorrow on RTL CBS Entertainment
- May 8: The Last Man on Earth (season 3) on Jack TV
- May 8: CSI: Crime Scene Investigation (season 7) on Fox TV Philippines
- May 12: Ang Dalawang Mrs. Real on Fox Filipino
- May 12: Fall in Love with Me on GMA News TV
- May 12: The Big Bang Theory season 10 on Jack TV
- May 13: House season 6 and The Mentalist season 3 on Fox TV Philippines
- May 13: Himouto! Umaru-chan on Yey!
- May 14: Bones season 10 and Terminator: The Sarah Connor Chronicles (season 2) on Fox TV Philippines
- May 15: Work Out New York on 2nd Avenue
- May 17: Life in Pieces (season 2) and The Middle season 8 on 2nd Avenue
- May 17: Adventures of Sonic the Hedgehog on Yey!
- May 18: Modern Family season 8 on 2nd Avenue
- May 19: Fated to Love You (Korean version; rerun) and Pasión de Amor on Jeepney TV
- May 19: Karelasyon on GMA News TV
- May 19: Haikyu!! season 1 (rerun) on Yey!
- May 20: Cold Case season 5, Fringe season 2, Gossip Girl season 3, Nikita season 1, Smallville season 8, Under the Dome season 1, Without a Trace season 6 and White Collar (season 6) on Fox TV Philippines
- May 21: Training Day on 2nd Avenue
- May 21: 24 season 8, 90210 season 3, Angel season 5 and One Tree Hill season 6 on Fox TV Philippines
- May 21: Sisterhood of Hip Hop (season 2) and This is Mike Stud on Jack TV
- May 22: Orange on Hero
- May 22: Family Guy season 15, Making History and The Simpsons season 28 on Jack TV
- May 23: Supergirl season 2 on ETC and Jack TV
- May 23: Annaliza on Jeepney TV
- May 24: The Flash season 3 on ETC and Jack TV
- May 24: Pandora in the Crimson Shell: Ghost Urn on Hero
- May 24: Bull (season 1) on RTL CBS Entertainment
- May 25: Arrow season 5 on 2nd Avenue
- May 25: Ouran High School Host Club (rerun) on Hero
- May 25: Arrow (season 5), Empire season 3 and Survivor: Game Changers on Jack TV
- May 26: Ultimate Otaku Teacher on Hero
- May 26: Goin' Bulilit Classics (Year 3 and 4) on Jeepney TV
- May 27: Emergency Couple on Jeepney TV
- May 28: HitRecord on TV (season 2) on Jack TV
- May 29: Winners & Losers season 5 on 2nd Avenue
- May 29: Banana Split (season 1) on Jeepney TV
- May 30: Rich Kids of Beverly Hills (season 1) on ETC
- May 30: Lucifer (season 2) on Jack TV
- May 30: OK Fine, 'To Ang Gusto Nyo! on Jeepney TV
- May 31: Prison Break season 5 on 2nd Avenue
- May 31: Fate/kaleid liner Prisma Illya 3rei! on Hero
- May 31: !Oka Tokat (rerun) on Jeepney TV
- May 31: CSI: Crime Scene Investigation season 8 on Fox TV Philippines
- June 1: My Love Donna and Quizon Avenue on Jeepney TV
- June 2: Biyahe ni Drew on Fox Filipino
- June 2: Reply 1997 on GMA News TV
- June 2: Red Envelope on Sari-Sari Channel
- June 3: Bagito on Jeepney TV
- June 4: The Biggest Loser USA season 15: Second Chances 2 on 2nd Avenue
- June 5: Finding Carter (season 2) on ETC
- June 6: Brief Encounters on 2nd Avenue
- June 9: Hiram na Alaala on Fox Filipino
- June 9: Yu-Gi-Oh! Arc-V (season 1) on Yey!
- June 11: Temptation on GMA News TV
- June 12: Bob's Burgers season 7 on Jack TV
- June 13: Power Rangers Dino Thunder on Yey!
- June 14: Lobo (rerun) on Jeepney TV
- June 15: Katipunan on Fox Filipino
- June 16: Healthline with Cheryl Cosim on AksyonTV
- June 16: Dr. Love: Always and Forever, Radyo Patrol Balita: Alas Kwatro and Magandang Gabi Dok on DZMM TeleRadyo
- June 16: Miss Ripley on Jeepney TV
- June 16: A Shelter for Love on Telenovela Channel
- June 16: Little Women II on Yey!
- June 17: Arrow season 1 on AksyonTV
- June 17: Reign season 4 on ETC
- June 17: The 100 (season 4), The Odd Couple (season 2) and You're the Worst (season 3) on Jack TV
- June 18: 40 is the New 30 on Colours
- June 18: Are You the One? season 2, Open House Overhaul and The Expandables (season 1) on ETC
- June 23: Ilustrado on Fox Filipino
- June 23: Mara Clara (2010; rerun) and WansapanaSummer on Jeepney TV
- June 23: Haikyu!! (season 2) on Yey!
- June 25: The K2 on Cine Mo!
- June 25: Skin Wars (season 2) on Jack TV
- June 28: Pretty Little Liars (season 7) on ETC
- June 28: Asia's Next Top Model (cycle 5) on Star World
- June 30: Bitag Live on AksyonTV
- July 1: Pasada Astig on Jeepney TV
- July 2: Jamie & Jimmy's Food Fight Club (season 2) on 2nd Avenue
- July 2: Sunday Hi-way on Jeepney TV
- July 2: Metal Fight Beyblade 4D on Yey!
- July 4: CSI: Crime Scene Investigation season 9 on Fox TV Philippines
- July 7: Mismo on DZMM TeleRadyo
- July 8: The Originals (season 4) on ETC
- July 10: Spartan: Ultimate Team Challenge (season 1) on Jack TV
- July 10: Bitten (season 3) on ETC
- July 12: iZombie (season 3) on ETC
- July 15: CNN Go on CNN Philippines
- July 15: OrganiqueTV and Sine Totoo (rerun) on GMA News TV
- July 15: Superstore season 1 on Jack TV
- July 21: Angel Eyes (rerun) on Jeepney TV
- July 21: Metal Fight Beyblade Zero G on Yey!
- July 22: FIBA World Basketball on AksyonTV
- July 23: Imbestigador on GMA News TV
- July 24: All of Me on Jeepney TV
- July 27: Boys Over Flowers (rerun) on Jeepney TV
- July 28: Carmela on Fox Filipino
- July 29: DC's Legends of Tomorrow season 1 on Jack TV
- July 29: Teenage Mutant Ninja Turtles season 3 on Yey!
- July 29: Extra Challenge (rerun) on GMA News TV
- July 30: Every Day Sarap with CDO on GMA News TV
- July 30: Knife Fight (season 3) on 2nd Avenue
- August 1: Nogizaka Haruka no Himitsu: Purezza on Hero
- August 1: Playing House (season 1) on Lifestyle
- August 1: Rich Kids of Beverly Hills (season 2) on ETC
- August 3: Project Runway All Stars season 5 on ETC
- August 4: Haikyu!! season 3 on Hero
- August 4: BeyWheelz on Yey!
- August 4: CSI: Crime Scene Investigation season 10 on Fox TV Philippines
- August 5: Blade Man on Jeepney TV
- August 6/August 18: My Girlfriend Is a Gumiho (rerun) on Jeepney TV
- August 10: Project Runway season 15 on ETC
- August 12: Blindspot (season 2) on 2nd Avenue
- August 13: Geeks Who Drink on Jack TV
- August 18: Genesis on Fox Filipino
- August 18: BeyWarriors: BeyRaiderz on Yey!
- August 24: Kampanerang Kuba (rerun) on Jeepney TV
- August 25: Two Mothers on GMA News TV
- August 25: KonoSuba (season 1) on Hero
- August 27: University Town (season 2) on S+A
- August 28: Game of Thrones (season 7) on HBO Asia
- August 30: Ningning on Jeepney TV
- September 1: Political Insider on CNN Philippines
- September 1: On the Wings of Love on Jeepney TV
- September 2: The Strain (season 3) on CT
- September 2: You, Me and the Apocalypse on Jack TV
- September 3: Signal on Cine Mo!
- September 3: Are You the One? season 3 on ETC
- September 4: Kaya ng Powers on Fox Filipino
- September 5: CSI: Crime Scene Investigation season 11 on Fox TV Philippines
- September 8: May Bukas Pa (2009; rerun) on Jeepney TV
- September 9: The Insider on Fox TV Philippines
- September 10: The Insider Weekend on Fox TV Philippines
- September 11: The Insider on ETC
- September 12: The Slap on 2nd Avenue
- September 14: Unforgettable Love (rerun) on Jeepney TV
- September 15: Makapiling Kang Muli on Fox Filipino
- September 15: Gotham season 2 on Jack TV
- September 15: Cunning Single Lady (rerun) on Jeepney TV
- September 15: Yu-Gi-Oh! Zexal season 2 (rerun) on Yey!
- September 19: Madam Secretary season 3 on 2nd Avenue
- September 20: The Asterisk War (season 1) on Hero
- September 21: Got to Believe (rerun) on Jeepney TV
- September 23: My Lovely Girl on Jeepney TV
- September 24: Galema: Anak ni Zuma on Jeepney TV
- September 24: Prison Break (season 5) on Fox TV Philippines
- September 29: Secret Hotel on GMA News TV
- September 29: BeyWarriors: Cyborg on Yey!
- September 30: From Helen's Kitchen (season 1) on Colours
- September 30: Black Work on CT
- October 5: CSI: Crime Scene Investigation season 12 on Fox TV Philippines
- October 7: The Tonight Show Starring Jimmy Fallon on CT
- October 11: Keijo!!!!!!!! Hip Whip Girl on Hero
- October 11: You're My Home on Jeepney TV
- October 12: MasterChef U.S. season 8 on Lifestyle
- October 13: It's Okay, That's Love (rerun) and Magkaribal (rerun) on Jeepney TV
- October 14: C the Difference on GMA News TV
- October 14: Let's Get Married on Jeepney TV
- October 14: 2017 Premier Volleyball League Collegiate Conference on S+A
- October 15: Welcome to Fairfax on Jack TV
- October 19: Twenty Again on Jeepney TV
- October 20: Aso ni San Roque on Fox Filipino
- October 20: Princess Sarah (2007) on Jeepney TV
- October 20: I Don't Trust Men Anymore on Telenovela Channel
- October 21: The Final Pitch on History
- October 22: Lip Sync Battle USA on GMA News TV
- October 22: Yowamushi Pedal on Yey!
- October 24: Breathless on 2nd Avenue
- October 24: The Asterisk War (season 2) on Hero
- October 27: All Out!! and Tanaka-kun is Always Listless on Hero
- October 28: Tulong Ko, Pasa Mo on AksyonTV
- October 29: Car Matchmaker (season 3) on Jack TV
- November 3: Aksyon sa Umaga and Reaksyon on AksyonTV
- November 3: Love & Lies on Fox Filipino
- November 5: The Biggest Loser USA season 16: Glory Days on 2nd Avenue
- November 6: Girlfriends' Guide to Divorce (season 2) on ETC
- November 6: CSI: Crime Scene Investigation season 13 on Fox TV Philippines
- November 7: Jam and Shout Out: Ligaw ng Kabataan on GMA News TV
- November 10: KonoSuba season 2 on Hero
- November 12: Hyde Jekyll, Me on Cine Mo!
- November 18: Banana Bites on Cine Mo!
- November 18: Mr. Robot (season 1) on Jack TV
- November 19: Hell's Kitchen U.S. season 13 on 2nd Avenue
- November 23: Anti-Magic Academy: The 35th Test Platoon on Hero
- November 24: Futbolilits on Fox Filipino
- November 24: Dolce Amore and Emergency Couple (rerun) on Jeepney TV
- November 24: Princess Sara (1985) on Yey!
- November 25: Dragon Collection (rerun) on Hero
- November 26: Misteryo (rerun) on GMA News TV
- December 1: Agua Bendita (rerun) on Jeepney TV
- December 1: Punto Asintado on AksyonTV
- December 3: The Mermaid on GMA News TV
- December 3: Heroes of Cosplay on Jack TV
- December 5: Doctor Foster (season 1) on 2nd Avenue
- December 6: CSI: Crime Scene Investigation season 14 on Fox TV Philippines
- December 7: Tubig at Langis on Jeepney TV
- December 8: Legendary Women on GMA News TV
- December 8: Kokey (rerun) on Jeepney TV
- December 14: Asia's Got Talent season 2 on AXN Asia
- December 15: Iglot and Pilyang Kerubin on Fox Filipino
- December 15: Girl Detective on GMA News TV
- December 16: DiscoverEats (season 1) on Colours
- December 16: Mr. Robot (season 2) on Jack TV
- December 17: My Hero Nation (season 8) on Hero
- December 21: Survivor: Heroes vs. Healers vs. Hustlers on Jack TV
- December 22: Be Careful with My Heart and Give Love on Christmas (rerun) on Jeepney TV
- December 23: Alamat on GMA News TV
- December 26: Black Work on 2nd Avenue
- December 28: Sensory Couple on Jeepney TV
- December 29: Global Newsroom, Real Talk and Sports Desk @ 6:30pm on CNN Philippines
- December 29: CSI: Crime Scene Investigation season 15 on Fox TV Philippines
- December 29: Two Wives (2014; rerun) on Jeepney TV
- December 29: Head Over Heels and La malquerida on Telenovela Channel
- December 30: Game of Silence on CT
- December 30: Wonderballs on GMA News TV
- December 30: Doctor Stranger on Jeepney TV

==== Unknown dates ====
- Funny Ka, Pare Ko (season 4) on Cine Mo!
- Rainbow Ruby on Yey!

==== Stopped airing ====
- February 26/June 25: GMA Public Affairs specials on GMA News TV
- March 19: Pop Talk (Sunday replay) on GMA News TV
- April 21: i-Witness (old episodes) on GMA News TV (replaced by GMA Public Affairs replay 4:45pm timeslot)
- April 21: Reel Time (old episodes) on GMA News TV (replaced by EZ Shop 6pm timeslot)
- April 22: Ang Mahiwagang Baul (rerun) and Hamon ng Kalikasan (rerun) on GMA News TV (replaced by EZ Shop 8am timeslot)
- April 23: Tunay na Buhay (Sunday replay) on GMA News TV
- May 26: Reel Time (Friday replay) on GMA News TV
- May 29/October 30: Biyahe ni Drew (Monday replay) on GMA News TV
- May 30/October 24: Good News Kasama si Vicky Morales (Tuesday replay) on GMA News TV
- May 31/October 25: Brigada (Wednesday replay) on GMA News TV
- June 1/October 26: iJuander (Thursday replay) on GMA News TV
- July 1: iJuander (Saturday replay) on GMA News TV
- July 9: Sunday Screening on GMA News TV (Reason: pre-empted by Sa Serbisyong Totoo, Nagbago ang Buhay Ko)
- July 9/December 17: Elemento (rerun) on GMA News TV
- July 17–28: Two Mothers on GMA News TV (Reason: pre-empted by 700 Club Asia live telethon TV special)
- July 23: Biyahe ni Drew (Sunday replay) on GMA News TV
- July 24: EZ Shop, Balita Pilipinas Ngayon, Born to Be Wild, News TV Quick Response Team, Every Day Sarap with CDO and Mars on GMA News TV (Reason: pre-empted by SONA 2017 live coverage)
- July 29: Pinas Sarap (Saturday replay) on GMA News TV
- August 20/November 4: Motorcycle Diaries (rerun) on GMA News TV
- August 26: Ang Pinaka (Saturday replay) on GMA News TV (replaced by 100% Pinoy! rerun)
- August 27: 100% Pinoy! (12:45pm Sunday rerun) on GMA News TV (replaced by 100% Pinoy! rerun)
- September 11–22: Secret Hotel on GMA News TV (Reason: pre-empted by 700 Club Asia live telethon TV special)
- September 23: Alamat and Motorcycle Diaries on GMA News TV (Reason: pre-empted by Alaala: A Martial Law Special)
- October 14: Tunay na Buhay (Saturday replay) on GMA News TV
- October 27: Investigative Documentaries (Friday replay) on GMA News TV
- November 4: Biyahe ni Drew (Saturday replay) on GMA News TV
- November 5: Pinas Sarap (Sunday replay) and Pinoy Meets World (rerun) on GMA News TV
- November 11: Alamat on GMA News TV (Reason: pre-empted by Philippine Seas)
- November 12: Ride PH on GMA News TV
- November 13–24: Legendary Women on GMA News TV (Reason: pre-empted by 700 Club Asia live telethon TV special)
- November 20: Reliable Sources on CNN Philippines
- December 3: Biyahe ni Drew (Sunday replay) on GMA News TV (Reason: pre-empted by Battle of Palawan)
- December 14: 100% Pinoy! (rerun) (reason: program replaced by Dishkarte of the Day) on GMA News TV
- December 29: MMK Klasik, SRO: Suhestiyon, Reaksyon at Opinyon, TNT: Tapatan ni Tunying and Usapang de Campanila on DZMM TeleRadyo (Reason: pre-empted by Ganap 2017)

=== Video streaming services ===
- January 20: Legend of the Blue Sea on Iflix
- February 9: Humans (season 1) on Iflix
- March 15: This Is Us (season 1) on Iflix
- March 16: Star (season 1) on Iflix
- March 25: Emerald City on Iflix
- April 3: Black Sails (season 4) on Iflix
- September 19: Midnight, Texas (season 1) on Iflix
- October 26: Channel Zero (season 2) on Iflix

== Networks ==
The following are a list of free-to-air and cable channels or networks launches and closures in 2017.

=== Launches ===
Date	Station	Channel	Source
April 8	Star Cinema PPV	Destiny Cable / Sky Cable Channel 158 SD, Channel 258 HD (Metro Manila) and Channel 58 SD, Channel 958 HD (Provincial); Sky Direct Channel 45 (Nationwide)	
April 12	eGG Network	Channel 32 HD (DTT)	
May 15	Aniplus Asia	Sky Cable Channel 139 SD (Metro Manila); EasyTV Home Channel 10 (Metro Manila)	
June 10	Fox Movies Philippines	Sky Cable / Destiny Cable Channel 55 SD / Channel 170 HD (Metro Manila) and Channel 406 SD / Channel 714 HD (Provincial); Cignal Channel 55 SD / Channel 211 HD (Nationwide); Dream Satellite TV Channel 18 SD (Nationwide); G Sat Channel 13 SD / Channel 47 HD (Nationwide)	
July 3	Salaam TV	Channel 42 (DTT)	
August 1	MTVph	Cablelink Channel 2 Cignal Channel 151 (Nationwide); Sky Cable / Destiny Cable Channel 71	
October 1	Fox Life	Sky Cable Channel 48 SD / Channel 172 HD (Metro Manila) and Channel 606 (Provincial); Destiny Cable Channel 48 SD Digital / Channel 114 SD Analog / Channel 172 HD (Metro Manila); Cablelink Channel 28 SD / Channel 310 HD; Cignal Channel 124 SD / Channel 232 HD (Nationwide); Dream Satellite TV Channel 16 (Nationwide); G Sat Channel 36 HD (Nationwide)	
December	MTV Classic	Cablelink Channel 100 SD	

=== Rebranded ===
The following is a list of television stations or cable channels that have made or will make noteworthy network rebrands in 2017.

Date	Rebranded from	Rebranded to	Channel	Source
September 3	ADDTV	Truth Channel	Channel 38 (DTT)	

=== Closures ===
Date	Station	Channel	Sign-on debut	Source
January 1	Discovery Kids	Sky Cable Channel 120	April 15, 2012	
January 31	Sundance Channel	Sky Cable Channel 183 HD (Metro Manila)	September 1, 2012	
February 1	Catsup	Channel 51 (DTT)	June 1, 2015	
March 31	Fox Sports News	Sky Cable Channel 86 SD (Metro Manila)	January 28, 2013	
March	Kids Nation Channel (KNC)	Channel 38 (DTT)	December 9, 2016	
June 10	Star Movies Philippines	Sky Cable Channel 55 SD (Metro Manila); Cignal Channel 55 SD (Nationwide); Dream Satellite TV Channel 18 SD (Nationwide); G Sat Channel 13 SD (Nationwide)	January 1, 2010	
June 10	Fox Movies Premium	Sky Cable / Destiny Cable Channel 170 HD (Metro Manila); Cignal Channel 211 HD (Nationwide); G Sat Channel 47 HD (Nationwide)	January 1, 2012	
June 30	SyFy	Sky Cable / Destiny Cable Channel 114 SD / Channel 188 HD (Metro Manila)	February 25, 2013	
June 30	Universal Channel	Sky Cable Channel 73 SD / Channel 187 HD (Metro Manila); Destiny Cable Channel 27 SD Analog / Channel 73 SD Digital / Channel 187 HD (Metro Manila); Cablelink Channel 31 (Metro Manila); Cignal Channel 118 SD (Nationwide)	August 3, 2012	
September 30	Juan Sports Channel	Cignal Channel 105 SD (Nationwide)	August 15, 2015	
October 1	Star World	Sky Cable Channel 48 SD / Channel 172 HD (Metro Manila) and Channel 606 (Provincial); Destiny Cable Channel 48 SD Digital / Channel 114 SD Analog / Channel 172 HD (Metro Manila); Cablelink Channel 28 SD / Channel 310 HD; Cignal Channel 124 SD / Channel 232 HD (Nationwide); Dream Satellite TV Channel 16 (Nationwide); G Sat Channel 36 HD (Nationwide)	July 1, 2000	
December 31	CT	Channel 30 (DTT); Cablelink Channel 40 (Metro Manila); Cignal Channel 22 SD (Nationwide); Sky Cable Channel 138 SD (Metro Manila)^{1} Destiny Cable Channel 138 SD (Metro Manila)^{1}	March 22, 2015	
December 31	RTL CBS Entertainment	Sky Cable Channel 53 SD / Channel 196 HD (Metro Manila); Cablelink Channel 37 SD / Channel 313 HD; Sky Direct Channel 35 SD (Nationwide)	October 2013	
December 31	RTL CBS Extreme	Sky Cable Channel 104 SD / Channel 209 HD (Metro Manila); Cablelink Channel 31 SD / Channel 219 HD	2015	

- Notes
1. ^1: On April 10, the provider pulled-out the channel due to unpaid carriage fees.

== Awards ==
- February: 3rd Students Choice Mass Media Awards, organized by Eastern Visayas State University
- February 18: 4th Paragala Central Luzon Media Awards, organized by Holy Angel University
- November 12: 31st PMPC Star Awards for Television, organized by Philippine Movie Press Club

== Births ==
- January 15: Imogen Cantong, singer and actress, daughter of Six Part Invention vocalists Rey and Kaye Cantong
- July 4: Jaze Capili, actor and singer
- October 29: Enicka Xaria Orbe, actress and model
- November 13: Ryrie Sophia, actress and model

== Deaths ==
January

- January 17 – Donna Villa, actress, film producer, and wife of Carlo J. Caparas (b. 1960)

February

- February 9 – Rev. Fr. Erick Santos, preacher of Kerygma TV and former host of Family Rosary Crusade (b. 1962)
- February 12 – Herminio Bautista, comedian, director, and former Quezon City councilor (b. 1934)

March

- March 2 – Cornelia "Angge" Lee, radio and talent manager of ABS-CBN (b. 1946)
- March 5 – Roden Araneta, finalist of Clown in a Million, Yes Yes Show mainstay, actor and comedian (b. 1961)

April

- April 17 – Wilfredo Cruz, songwriter (b. 1947)

May

- May 2 – Romeo Vasquez, actor (b. 1939)
- May 24 – Gil Portes, film director, film producer and screenwriter (b. 1945)

June

- June 3 – Carlos "Bobong" Velez, founder of Vintage Television (b. 1945)
- June 30 – Jake Tordesillas, writer of GMA Network programs (b. 1948)

July

- July 14 – Veronica Alejar, News Anchor, former UNTV and PTV Host and recently host of The Breaking Point and Kilos Pronto (b. 1975)
- July 21 – Soxie Topacio, director of GMA Network programs, actor, film and theater director (b. 1951)

August

- August 1 – Alfie Lorenzo, talent manager and entertainment columnist (b. 1939)
- August 8 – Zeny Zabala, movie and television actress (b. 1937)
- August 24 – Amelyn Veloso, News Anchor, former IBC, TV5 and CNN Philippines News Anchor (b. 1974)

September

- September 30 – Joe Taruc, News Anchor of DZRH and host of Liberty Live with Joe Taruc/Liberty on TV (b. 1946)

October

- October 9 – Tony Calvento, News Anchor of ABS-CBN (b. 1954)
- October 11 – Emmanuel Borlaza, film director (b. 1935)
- October 15 – Chinggoy Alonzo, actor (b. 1950)
- October 22 – Baldo Marro, actor and director (b. 1948)

November

- November 4 – Isabel Granada, actress and singer (b. 1976)
- November 8 – Alvin Sejera, former IBC 13 news reporter (b. 1987)
- November 11 – Franco Hernandez Lumanlan, dancer and member of It's Showtime's all-male group, Hashtags (b. 1991)

== See also ==
- 2017 in television
