= An Evening with Raoul =

- Directed by: Joel Mendoza
- Presented by: Raoul Imbach
- Country of origin: Philippines
- No. of episodes: 8

Production
- Producer: Asian Television Content Corporation
- Camera setup: Multi-camera setup
- Running time: 60 minutes

Original release
- Network: Intercontinental Broadcasting Corporation
- Release: July 1 – August 19, 2017

An Evening with Raoul was a weekly musical variety talk show hosted by Raoul Imbach, with the band The Wild Tortillas. Imbach is a counselor and deputy chief of mission of the Embassy of Switzerland in the Philippines from August 2013 to December 2021, and a singer more popularly known by his renditions of Filipino and Italian songs.

The program was produced by Asian Television Content Corporation (ATC) and aired over IBC-13 every Saturday at 10:00 p.m. to 11:00 p.m. (UTC +08) for one season, starting July 1, 2017. The program has featured different segments including cooking, interviews and performances, among others.

== See also ==
- List of programs broadcast by Intercontinental Broadcasting Corporation
