= Case Solved =

2017 Philippine television drama series

- Title card
- Genre: Docudrama
- Presented by: Dingdong Dantes
- Country of origin: Philippines
- Original language: Tagalog
- No. of episodes: 6

Production
- Camera setup: Multiple-camera setup
- Running time: 45 minutes
- Production company: GMA Entertainment TV

Original release
- Network: GMA Network
- Release: February 18 – March 25, 2017

Case Solved is a 2017 Philippine television drama documentary anthology series broadcast by GMA Network. Hosted by Dingdong Dantes, it premiered on February 18, 2017, on the network's Sabado Star Power sa Hapon line up. The series concluded on March 25, 2017, with a total of six episodes.

== Ratings ==
According to AGB Nielsen Philippines' Nationwide Urban Television Audience Measurement, the pilot episode of Case Solved earned a 14.2% rating.
