= The Expandables =

- Genre: Home renovation reality
- Starring: Rob Evans; Mia Parres
- Country of origin: Canada
- No. of seasons: 2

Production
- Production company: Tricon Film & Television

Original release
- Network: HGTV Canada
- Release: January 8, 2015

The Expandables is a Canadian home renovation television series produced by Tricon Films & Television, which premiered January 8, 2015 on HGTV Canada. The series is also slated to air on DIY Network in the United States.

Hosted by contractor Rob Evans and designer Mia Parres, the series features the duo meeting with homeowners whose living spaces are not meeting their needs. Each of the hosts then comes up with a renovation plan to improve the functionality of the home, which are presented to the homeowners. After the homeowners make their choice of which plan to pursue, the hosts collaborate to finish the renovation and design work.

The series premiered in Australia on September 14, 2015 on LifeStyle Home.
