= Kapampangan News =

Defunct kapampangan newscast of CNN Philippines

- Logo used from 2015–2016
- Created by: Nine Media Corporation; Radio Philippines Network
- Developed by: CNN Philippines/CNN
- Presented by: Nicolette Henson-Hizon
- Narrated by: Bong Aportadera
- Theme music composer: Hit Productions, Inc.
- Country of origin: Philippines
- Original language: Kapampangan
- No. of episodes: n/a (airs daily)

Production
- Production locations: CNN Philippines Newscenter; Mandaluyong
- Running time: 30 minutes (2014–16); 15 minutes (2016–17)

Original release
- Network: Solar News Channel (2014); 9TV (2014-15); CNN Philippines (2015-17)
- Release: August 4, 2014 – March 31, 2017

CNN Philippines Kapampangan News is a Philippine television news broadcasting show broadcast by Solar News Channel, 9TV and CNN Philippines. Anchored by Nicolette Henson-Hizon, it aired from August 4, 2014 to March 31, 2017. The newscasts aired weekdays at 1:15 p.m.

== Background ==
=== Premiere ===
Following Cebuano News, Kapampangan News was another innovative program by Solar News Channel to deliver its trademark newsgathering in Kapampangan language, the 6th widely spoken language in the Philippines and one of the most widely spoken in Luzon. Kapampangan News was launched on August 4, 2014, with its graphics and title card updated 20 days later (August 24) following channel's rebrand to 9TV. The current incarnation was launched on March 16, 2015, in lieu with the launch of CNN Philippines along with a CNN-themed graphics and a revamped news studio.

=== Revamp and cancellation ===
On February 15, 2016, Cebuano News and Kapampangan News reduced their timeslot from their half-hour running time to 15 minutes until the network quietly axed the newscast on March 31, 2017.

Along with Cebuano News and the 1:30 pm filler slot, Kapampangan News was replaced on April 3, 2017, by the simulcast of the 1 am EDT hour of CNN Newsroom with Cyril Vanier and Natalie Allen (Monday) and John Vause and Isha Sesay (Tuesday to Friday) as a part of Armie Jarin-Bennett's continuing revamps on the network.

== Anchors ==
=== Final anchor ===
- Nicolette Henson-Hizon

=== Final substitute anchors ===
- Jayvee Dizon
- Nevi Calma

=== Final reporters ===
- Justine Dizon
- Jaypee Bugayon
- Amir Medina
- Joelyn Baluyut

== See also ==
- Nine Media Corporation
- CNN Philippines
