= Winners & Losers season 5 =

Season of television series

Winners & Losers
- Season 5
- Season 5 DVD
- No. of episodes: 13

Release
- Original network: Seven Network
- Original release: 5 July – 12 September 2016

Season chronology
- ← Previous; Season 4

The fifth and final season of the television drama series Winners & Losers premiered on 5 July 2016 on the Seven Network in Australia. In season five, friendship and love will triumph as Jenny, Frances, Sophie and Riley support each other through happiness and heartache, delivering the show's most emotional season yet. Filming for the season began in March 2015 and concluded in July 2015.

== Production ==
On 3 December 2014, it was announced that Seven had renewed Winners & Losers for a fifth season, set to air in 2016.

Julie McGauran, the head of Drama at Seven stated, "At its heart, Winners & Losers is about the unbreakable bond of friendship and that's why it resonates with so many Australians. It's an evolving story about young women trying to make their way in life, connected by shared experiences and supporting each other along the way. We're delighted the journey continues."

A fifth season was confirmed on 3 December 2014. A four-month production commenced in Melbourne in March 2015. Production for the season began on 2 March 2015 and concluded on 21 July 2015. Filming for the season began on 16 March 2015, with the first block directed by Fiona Banks.

== Cast ==
=== Main cast ===
- Melissa Bergland as Jenny Reynolds
- Virginia Gay as Frances James
- Melanie Vallejo as Sophie Wong
- Demi Harman as Riley Hart
- Sarah Grace as Bridget Fitzpatrick
- Nathin Butler as Luke MacKenzie (12 episodes)
- Nick Russell as Gabe Reynolds
- James Saunders as Pete Reeves
- Scott Smart as Alex MacKenzie (12 episodes)
- Paul Moore as Wes Fitzpatrick (6 episodes)

=== Recurring cast ===
- Rachael Maza as Veronica Sewell (5 episodes)
- Nicholas Bell as Keith Maxwell (4 episodes)
- Nick Carrafa as Cliff Boyes (4 episodes)
- Jeremy Stanford as Derek Watters (3 episodes)
- Katrina Milosevic as Eliza Dempsey (3 episodes)
- Frank Sweet as Cain Godfrey (3 episodes)
- Francis Greenslade as Brian Gross (1 episode)
- Denise Scott as Trish Gross (1 episode)
- Jack Pearson as Patrick Gross (1 episode)
- Michala Banas as Tiffany Turner (1 episode)

=== Guest cast ===
- Daisy and Lucy Bennett as George James (11 episodes)
- Chloe and Madeleine Taylor as Aalivyah Fitzpatrick (5 episodes)
- Joshua Hine as Dan Fawkner (2 episodes)
- Ian Bliss as Colin Gammell (2 episodes)
- Bob Morley as Ethan Quinn (2 episodes)
- Todd McKenney as Bryce Thomson (1 episode)
- Carolyn Bock as Louise Wong (1 episode)
- Glenda Linscott as Lily Patterson (1 episode)

=== Casting ===
The cast for the fifth season was confirmed in July 2015, when the series was being filmed. Former Home and Away actress, Demi Harman will join the series as Riley Hart. James Saunders will reprise his role of Pete Reeves. Wentworth actress, Katrina Milosevic will join the series as Eliza Dempsey. Katherine Hicks, Tom Wren, Sibylla Budd, and Laura Gordon will not return as Sam Mackenzie, Doug Graham, Carla Hughes and Izzy Hughes.

== Episodes ==
No. overall	No. in season	Title	Directed by	Written by	Original release date	Australian viewers
97	1	"Let the Right One In"	Fiona Banks	Emma Gordon	5 July 2016	0.697
Jenny is having nightmares about her and Gabe's windfall after they buy a new house, and her dreams become a reality when she mistakenly talks Gabe into hiring an attractive new partner, Riley. Frances and Pete's relationship blossoms as she agrees to have a paternity test with Keith and learns he is gay and her biological father. Sophie is hired at a women's clinic and meets a charming, young barista named Alex, who flirts with her. Luke introduces Alex to the girls as his younger brother. Riley arrives in Melbourne and befriends the girl group, moving in with Sophie and Luke.
98	2	"Ready Set Go"	Fiona Banks	Shaun Topp	12 July 2016	0.679
Frances has trouble letting Keith into her life, but after a slip of the tongue, she decides to let him in, ignorant to the fact that he is tackling cancer. Riley is forced into moving on from her ex Dan, when Sophie hooks her up with a young journalist called Jamie, who she sleeps with. Sophie moves into Luke's room so Alex can move into the share house permanently. Alex hides the fact he is a cocaine user by using a disagreement with his landlord to explain his war wounds. Jenny is over the moon when she learns that she is pregnant, but is later saddened to learn it is an ectopic pregnancy and has to have an abortion.
99	3	"NBF"	Nicholas Bufalo	Rene Zandveld	19 July 2016	0.705
Sophie discovers that Alex is a cocaine user and, giving into her past temptation, uses for the first time in five years. Riley introduces Gabe and Luke to the world of ice hockey and gives Gabe an idea for his new app - a spoiler blocker. Frances learns of Keith's cancer after he collapses and in a moment of gratitude, she decides to give him money to secure a spot in his treatment, ignorant to the fact that he is up to no good. Jenny is astounded by the teaching style of Rob's replacement, Eliza Dempsey and soon declares her as her 'NBF' when she introduces her to the world of roller derby.
100	4	"When the Wheels Come Off"	Nicholas Bufalo	Eloise Healey	19 July 2016	0.691
Riley and Gabe's professional profiling goes incredibly well, however Riley is soon attacked by online trolls. Jenny's friendship with Eliza develops until Eliza kisses her, which ends with her quitting the school and leaving Jenny by herself. Sophie is forced the treat Cain, a user, who is friends with Alex and lies to Luke when she gives him the truth, without implicating his brother. Frances is horrified when Lily announces that Keith isn't her father, so in an act of spite, she transfers him the $600,000 for his cancer treatment, but later learns he is a con artist and has fled the country. Note: The DVD lists the title of this episode as 'The Happy Ever After Thing'.
101	5	"Hook, Line & Sinker"	Jean-Pierre Mignon	Mithila Gupta	26 July 2016	0.601
Frances pushes her friends away after Keith cons $600,000 out of her, but when Pete decides to call the police against her wishes, she reveals that she embezzled the money. Riley struggles to cope with the trolling that she is receiving online until she discovers the culprit was the competition for her job. Jenny and Gabe are hauled into help the Millner Boys High with a cleanup, and awkwardly encounter Eliza. Sophie and Alex's feuding comes to an end when they decide to tell Luke the truth about Cain, after a day of forced fishing and bonding, and admit they have been lying to him for weeks.
102	6	"Caught in the Crossfire"	Jean-Pierre Mignon	Trent Roberts	26 July 2016	0.583
Riley's irrational fears of not being taken seriously in a male-dominated industry are quashed when a hot shot investor, Colin Gammel, decides to invest in Next Jen and offer her a job, which she declines. Jenny and Gabe find the perfect house, but their marriage begins to hit rough waters when Jenny can't stop comparing their successes. Frances is investigated for embezzlement, but is cleared when Bridget takes the fall. Sophie and Alex's involvement in the drug ring hit a climax when a hostage situation goes wrong and Sophie is forced to use a wrench to defend herself, Luke and Alex, killing Cain in the process.
103	7	"Cold Hard Bitch"	Ian Gilmour	Nicky Arnall	2 August 2016	0.619
Sophie struggles with the guilt of killing Cain, but after learning the manslaughter charge has been dropped, she has sex with Alex. Riley meets Ethan Quinn, an attractive young intellectual investigator, and despite learning he's married, she decides to become his mistress. Jenny and Gabe's holiday is marred when they find Bridget and Wes at the same resort, but their romantic getaway is dampened when Gabe learns that Jenny lied about the house auction, and is jealous of him. Frances apologises to Pete and asks him to move in with her. Luke takes the next step and proposes to Sophie.
104	8	"No Going Back"	Ian Gilmour	Eloise Healey	2 August 2016	0.586
Jenny's decision to follow her passions result in her being put in charge of the school play and involving the boys in it. Sophie, after some initial hesitation, accepts Luke's marriage proposal but decides to stay quiet about her one-night stand with Alex. Frances and Pete's decision to move in together makes them realise how similar they are to one another and how much they love each other. Riley and Gabe attend a tech trade show and after they are forced to break-and-enter to get their stolen presentation back, Gabe realises the issues in his marriage and plants a drunken kiss on Riley.
105	9	"The Woman in the Mirror"	Jet Wilkinson	Trent Roberts	23 August 2016	0.668
Riley decides to accept the job at Zuko offered to her by Colin Gammel and ends her relationship with Ethan. Frances organises a birthday party for George's first birthday, but after a discussion with Bridget about who she should and shouldn't invite, she realises that she is turning into Tiffany Turner. Gabe struggles after his drunken kiss with Riley, and when Jenny learns the truth, the two have an argument. Luke organises to ask Sophie's mother Louise for Sophie's hand in marriage, however when Louise offers up a home truth and some advice, Sophie and Luke begin to question their relationship.
106	10	"Best Laid Plans"	Jet Wilkinson	Daniel O'Sullivan	30 August 2016	0.558
Jenny organises for the girls to go "glamping", however the mood is marred when Sophie and Frances convince Riley to come and Jenny is more than unimpressed. Alex tries to organise a boys' night in, however when Pete brings baby George and Wes brings Bridget, he decides to bail and hooks up with the pizza delivery girl. Sophie admits to Frances that she slept with Alex and blames herself for sabotaging everything. Gabe is given hope for his marriage after talking to Bridget. Riley and Jenny reconcile. When Jenny returns home, she tells Gabe that the breakdown of their marriage is mostly her fault, and gives him her wedding ring.
107	11	"Bloom"	Fiona Banks	Nicky Arnall	6 September 2016	0.609
Frances blasé attitude to the celebration of milestones is revealed to be a poor attempt to cover up her nerves about attending Pete's parents' fortieth wedding anniversary. After learning how much he has sacrificed for her, Frances proposes and the two get married. Sophie and Luke's relationship hits a snag when she reveals she doesn't want kids and they break up. Riley is roped into a woman's empowerment seminar by Bridget, which inspires her to change her life. Jenny admits she misses Gabe, but their relationship remains on life support. Alex gets fired, and Luke discovers his affair with Sophie. Jenny discovers she's pregnant.
108	12	"Ex Marks the Spot"	Fiona Banks	Shaun Topp	12 September 2016	0.667
Jenny realises that a pregnancy does not a marital problem fix, until she and Gabe decide to mend old wounds and learn that they are expecting twins. Riley's attempts to reconnect with her ex-boyfriend Dan turn sour when she learns that he is marrying his high school sweetheart. Sophie's discovery that Luke knows about her one-night stand with his brother forces her to break up a fight between them. Frances and Pete attempt to adjust to married life. Luke makes plans to return home to the farm, while Alex decides to head to Byron Bay. Tiffany sends out invitations to the fifteen-year reunion. Final appearance of Nathin Butler and Scott Smart as Luke MacKenzie and Alex MacKenzie, respectively
109	13	"The Last Five Years"	Fiona Banks	Emma Gordon	12 September 2016	0.711
Jenny, Frances and Sophie take part in a documentary about the lives of lottery winners, five years on. Sophie realises that she isn't truly happy, and in response, buys the women's clinic she's been working at. Riley is asked by Colin to head up the Melbourne office of NextJen, whilst Gabe is offered a job in San Francisco. Frances and Pete buy his parents' house in the suburbs. Patrick, Trish and Brian return, and with the announcement of Patrick and Jasmine's split, a spark is ignited between him and Riley. After imagining what their lives would be like if they'd spent their money differently – Jenny staying at the call centre and meeting Gabe three years earlier, Sophie moving to Kenya permanently and Frances learning how to fly a helicopter – the girls head back to Renwood Girls High for their 15-year reunion. Tiffany apologises for everything that she has put them through in the past 15 years, especially in 2012, which ended in her and Matt having an affair behind Bec's back. As the girls dance, their futures are revealed: Jenny moves to San Francisco with Gabe and they have twin daughters, Frances becomes a judge and loves life in the suburbs with Pete and George and Sophie moves back to Kenya and opens a second women's clinic over there in Cat's name. Return appearance of Francis Greenslade, Denise Scott, Jack Pearson and Michala Banas as Brian Gross, Trish Gross, Patrick Gross and Tiffany Turner, respectively

== Ratings ==
Episode	Title	Original air date	Overnight viewers	Nightly rank	Consolidated viewers	Adjusted rank
1	Let the Right One In	5 July 2016	0.585	19	0.697	15
2	Ready Set Go	12 July 2016	0.551	19	0.679	14
3	NBF	19 July 2016	0.561	14	0.705	11
4	When the Wheels Come Off	19 July 2016	0.553	16	0.691	12
5	Hook, Line & Sinker	26 July 2016	0.465	<20	0.601	16
6	Caught in the Crossfire	26 July 2016	0.450	<20	0.583	17
7	Cold Hard Bitch	2 August 2016	0.501	19	0.619	14
8	No Going Back	2 August 2016	0.470	<20	0.586	17
9	The Woman in the Mirror	23 August 2016	0.514	19	0.668	16
10	Best Laid Plans	30 August 2016	0.411	<20	0.558	18
11	Bloom	6 September 2016	0.463	<20	0.609	17
12	Ex Marks the Spot	12 September 2016	0.552	<20	0.667	17
13	The Last Five Years	12 September 2016	0.582	18	0.711	16

- Figures are OzTAM Data for the 5 City Metro areas.
- Overnight - Live broadcast and recordings viewed the same night.
- Consolidated - Live broadcast and recordings viewed within the following seven days.

== DVD release ==
Winners & Losers - The Complete Fifth Season
Set details	Special features	
13 episodes; 3-disc set; 1.78:1 aspect ratio; English (Dolby Digital 5.1); M (recommended for mature audiences: mature themes, violence, sexual references and coarse language)	Behind the Scenes	
Release Dates
Region 1	Region 2	Region 4
—	—	5 October 2016
