= Monster Retsuden Oreca Battle =

Japanese media franchise

- Monster Retsuden Oreca Battle!!!

モンスター烈伝 オレカバトル!!! (Monsutā Retsuden Oreka Batoru!!!)
- Manga
- Written by: Satoshi Yamaura
- Published by: Shogakukan
- Magazine: CoroCoro Comic
- Original run: June 2012 – February 2015
- Volumes: 6
- Manga

Maō Da Ze! Oreca Battle
- Written by: Satoshi Yamaura
- Published by: Shogakukan
- Magazine: CoroCoro Comic
- Original run: March 2015 – January 2016
- Volumes: 2
- Anime television series
- Directed by: Tetsurō Amino
- Studio: OLM, Xebec
- Original network: TXN (TV Tokyo)
- Original run: April 7, 2014 – March 30, 2015
- Episodes: 51

Monster Retsuden Oreca Battle (Japanese: モンスター烈伝 オレカバトル, Hepburn: Monsutā Retsuden Oreka Batoru) is a Japanese trading card arcade game by Konami, released in March 2012. A manga adaptation was serialized in Shogakukan's CoroCoro Comic from June 2012 to February 2015. It was followed by a sequel series called Maō Da Ze! Oreca Battle from March 2015 to January 2016. An anime adaptation aired between April 7, 2014, and March 30, 2015, alongside Dragon Collection, another Konami video game adaptation. Like Dragon Collection, Oreca Battle has no ending theme and only an opening theme and with all its credits incorporated into the opening theme which is a hallmark for some anime that premiered on TV Asahi in Japan.

A spinoff titled ORE'N (Japanese: オレン) or Battle Meme Chronicle ORE'N was released in April 2024 in Japan only.

A sequel titled Monster Retsuden Oreca Battle 2 (Japanese: モンスター烈伝 オレカバトル2, Hepburn: Monsutā Retsuden Oreka Batoru Tsu) was released in December 2024 in Japan only.

== Characters ==
Fire Orega (俺牙 ファイヤ, Orega Faiya)
Voiced by: Tomo Muranaka
Kerogon (ケロゴン, Kerogon)
Voiced by: Tomoko Kaneda
Data Uchiki (内木 デー太, Uchiki Dē Dai)
Voiced by: Aki Toyosaki
Gantetsu Kurata (倉田 岩鉄, Kurata Gantetsu)
Voiced by: Ryūta Yano
Pandora (パンドラ, Pandora)
Voiced by: Kōichi Sakaguchi
Mayumi Kaede 'Mayuyu' (Photoshop-kun) (倉田岩鉄, Mayuyu)
Voiced by: Romi Park

== Plot ==
One day, the characters depicted on the cards mysteriously disappear. A boy named Fire Orega begins to see the characters from the cards appear in real life and notices them causing problems. Only by approaching an Oreca named Pandora can Fire hope to restore the cards to their normal form, but it means he'll have to participate in real life Oreca Battles to do so.

== Episode list ==
Opening theme

- "Oreca Omaeka Genkai Battle!!" by Akira Kushida

No.	Title	Original release date
1	"A Real Oreca Battle!!" "Honmono no Oreka Batoru!!" (本物のオレカバトル!!)	April 7, 2014
2	"The Warrior Tanta and the Red Dragon" "Senshi Tanta to Reddo Doragon" (戦士タンタとレッドドラゴン)	April 14, 2014
3	"The Warrior of Black Flames Bahn" "Kuro Homura no Senshi Bān" (黒炎の戦士バーン)	April 21, 2014
4	"The Halberd of Darkness" "Yami no Harubāto" (闇のハルバート)	April 28, 2014
5	"Fire Summoner Heat Appears!" "Kenzan! Honō no Shōka Samurai Hīto!" (見参! 炎の召喚士ヒート!)	May 5, 2014
6	"Ashiyura, the Miraculous Union!" "Ashiyura Kyōi no Gattai!" (アシユラ 驚異の合体!)	May 12, 2014
7	"Kerogon Goes Out" "Kerogon no Otsukai" (ケロゴンのおつかい)	May 19, 2014
8	"Smelly Attack! The Raging Serpent Mushufushu" "Nioi Jī! Okoru Hebi Mushufushu" (臭撃! 怒る蛇ムシュフシュ)	May 26, 2014
9	"Dark Warrior Tanta`s Counterattack!" "Ma Senshi Tanta no Gyakushū!" (魔戦士タンタの逆襲!)	June 2, 2014
10	"The Lone Swordsman Dante" "Kokō no Kenshi Dante" (孤高の剣士ダンテ)	June 9, 2014
11	"Pandora`s Dojo from Hell!" "Jigoku no Pandora Dōjō!" (地獄のパンドラ道場!)	June 16, 2014
12	"Demon Queen Riviere of the Demon World" "Makai no Joō Riviēru" (魔界の女王リヴィエール)	June 23, 2014
13	"Scorching Purgatory! The Power of Demon King Mus!" "Shakunetsu Rengoku! Maō Muusu no Chikara!" (灼熱煉獄! 魔王ムウスの力!)	June 30, 2014
14	"The Shocking Rebirth! The Scarlet Dragon!" "Gekitan! Sukāreddo・Doragon!!" (激誕! スカーレッド・ドラゴン!!)	July 7, 2014
15	"Raging Waves Kanicrab!" "Dotō Kanikurabu!" (怒涛 カニクラブ!)	July 14, 2014
16	"The Oreca That Lost Its Memories" "Kioku no Nai Oreka" (記憶のないオレカ)	July 21, 2014
17	"The Trial of the Blue Dragon" "Burū Doragon no Shiren" (ブルードラゴンの試練)	July 28, 2014
18	"Independent Research Project: Insect Wars!" "Jikukenkyū wa Konchū Taisen!" (自由研究は昆虫大戦!)	August 4, 2014
19	"Flow's Memory Returns" "Yomigaetta Furou no Kioku" (よみがえったフロウの記憶)	August 11, 2014
20	"Scissor Dragon Zarigarion!" "Hasami Ryū Zarigarion" (鋏竜ザリガリオン)	August 18, 2014
21	"The Pirtaes of the Kraken" "Pairētsu・Oza・Korāken" (パイレーツ・オブ・クラーケン)	August 25, 2014
22	"The Knight of Darkness Versus the Knight of Light" "Yami no Kishi VS Kō no Kishi" (闇の騎士VS光の騎士)	September 1, 2014
23	"The Evil Vice-Admiral Fisca" "Ma Umishō Fisuka" (魔海将フィスカ)	September 8, 2014
24	"Absolute Zero: Grand Blue Dragon!" "Zettai Reido Gura Burū・Doragon!" (絶対零度 グランブルー・ドラゴン!)	September 15, 2014
25	"Prince Flow's Secret" "Ōji Furō no Himitsu" (王子フロウの秘密)	September 22, 2014
26	"The Secret Treasure: The Sea King's Orb" "Hihō Kaiō no Ōbu" (秘宝 海王のオーブ)	September 29, 2014
27	"Battle Royal in the Evil Depths of the Ocean! Dante`s Decision" "Ma Umi Dai Randen! Dante no Ketsui" (魔海大乱戦! ダンテの決意)	October 6, 2014
28	"Attacked with Despair! Evil Lord Azul!" "Osoi Kuru Zetsubō! Jashin Azūru" (襲い来る絶望! 邪神アズール)	October 13, 2014
29	"The Clang of DJ's Gong" "Uchi Narasa Reru DJ no Gongu" (打ち鳴らされるDJのゴング)	October 20, 2014
30	"Farewell Avadon" "Sayōmata Avadon" (さようならアヴァドン)	October 27, 2014
31	"The Captured Knight, Rock" "Toraware no Kishi Rokku" (囚われの騎士ロック)	November 3, 2014
32	"A New Oreca Battler" "Aratanaru Oreca Batorā" (新たなるオレカバトラー)	November 10, 2014
33	"Tremble with Fear! The Dark Dragon Fafnir" "Senritsu! Ankoku Ryū Fafunīru!" (戦慄!暗黒竜ファヴニール!)	November 17, 2014
34	"Infiltrate Saqqara`s Dungeon" "Sennyū! Sakkāra Kangoku" (潜入! サッカーラ監獄)	November 24, 2014
35	"Escape Saqqara`s Prison!" "Dasshutsu! Sakkāra Kangoku" (脱出!サッカーラ監獄)	December 1, 2014
36	"Hell`s Sweethearts, Gozu and Mezu" "Jigoku no Suītsu Gozu & Mezu" (地獄のスイーツ ゴズ&メズ)	December 8, 2014
37	"Surprise! The Desert`s Hospitality" "Supraizu! Suna Baku no Omotenashi" (サプライズ! 砂縛のおもてなし)	December 15, 2014
38	"Hope Hangs on the Lamp!" "Todoke! Ranpu ni Kakeru Omoi" (届け! ランプにかける想い)	December 22, 2014
39	"We Are the Oreca Boys!" "Oretachi Oreka Shōnen Dan!" (俺たちオレカ少年団!)	January 5, 2015
40	"The Laughing Evil God Saqqara" "Warau Jashin Sakkāra" (笑う邪神サッカーラ)	January 12, 2015
41	"Celestial Dragon, Bahamut" "Tenkai Ryū Bahamūto" (天界竜バハムート)	January 19, 2015
42	"Find the Monsters in the Woods!" "Sagase! Mori No Monsutā!" (探せ! 森のモンスター!)	January 26, 2015
43	"Raging Storm! Demon King Nanawarai" "Ōarashi! Maō Nanawarai" (大嵐! 魔王ナナワライ)	February 2, 2015
44	"Head of the Sacred Wind, Oroshi" "Kaze Komo no Zokuchō Oroshi" (風隠の族長オロシ)	February 9, 2015
45	"The Sacred Tree of the Wind" "Reiboku-fū Shizuku no Ki" (霊木 風しずくの樹)	February 16, 2015
46	"Electrifying Evolution! Kukulkan!" "Dengeki Shinka! Kukurukan!" (電撃進化! ククルカン!)	February 23, 2015
47	"Shocking Evolution! Behemoth!" "Shōgeki Shinka! Behimosu!" (衝撃進化! ベヒモス!)	March 2, 2015
48	"The One Exiled from the Hidden Family" "Kaze Komo no Tsuihō-sha" (風隠の追放者)	March 9, 2015
49	"The Truth Behind the Seed of the Wind" "Kaze Shizuku no Shinjitsu!" (風しずくの真実!)	March 16, 2015
50	"Hayate`s Decision" "Hayate no Ketsui" (ハヤテの決意)	March 23, 2015
51	"Our Oreca Battle!!!" "Oretachi no Oreka Batoru!!!" (俺たちのオレカバトル!!!)	March 30, 2015
