= Follow Your Heart (TV program) =

2017 Philippine television reality show

- Title card
- Genre: Reality show
- Presented by: Heart Evangelista
- Theme music composer: Len Calvo
- Opening theme: "Walang Iwanan" by Julie Anne San Jose and Christian Bautista
- Country of origin: Philippines
- Original language: Tagalog
- No. of episodes: 13

Production
- Camera setup: Multiple-camera setup
- Running time: 36–39 minutes
- Production company: GMA News and Public Affairs

Original release
- Network: GMA Network
- Release: April 23 – July 16, 2017

Follow Your Heart is a 2017 Philippine television reality show broadcast by GMA Network. Hosted by Heart Evangelista, it premiered on April 23, 2017 on the network's Sunday Grande line up. The show concluded on July 16, 2017, with a total of 13 episodes.

The show is streaming online on YouTube.

== Hosts ==
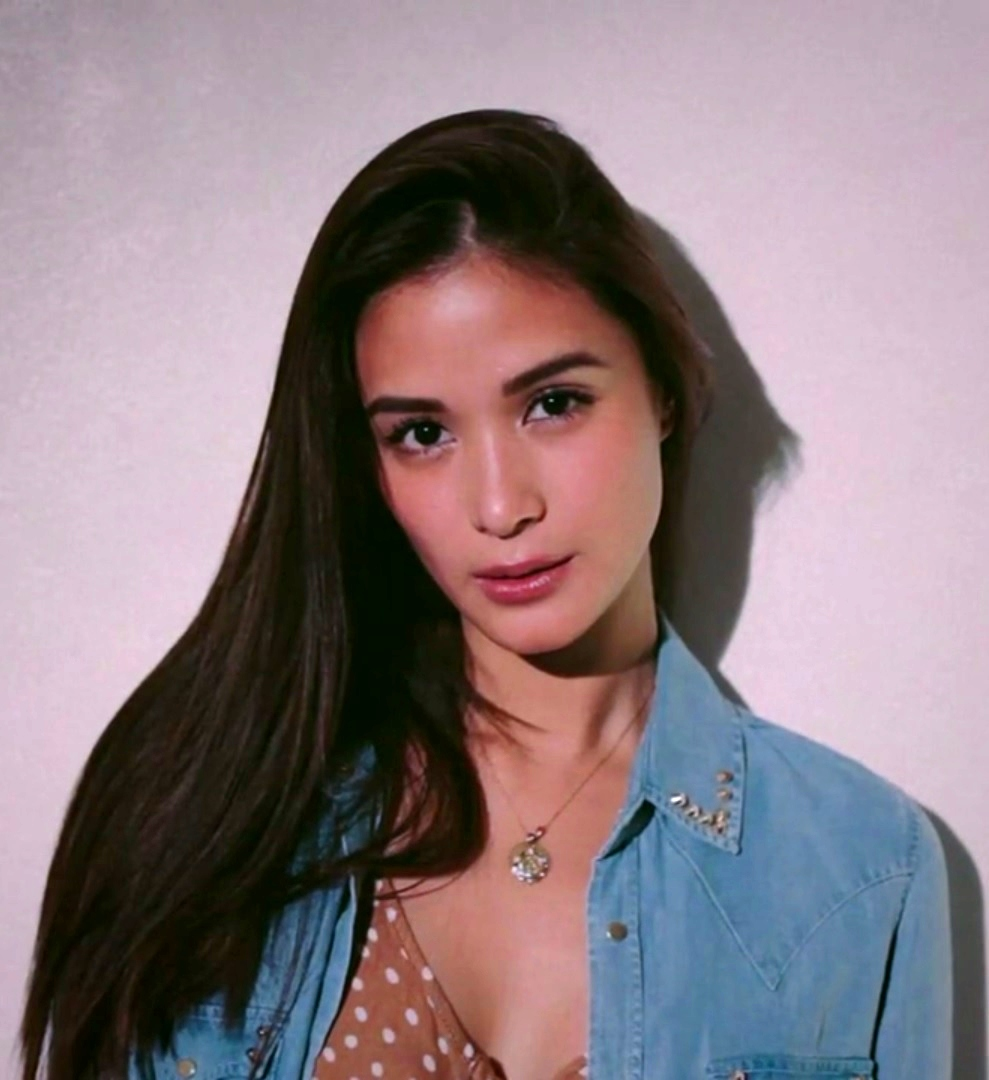
Heart Evangelista served as a host.

- Heart Evangelista
- Terry Gian

== Ratings ==
According to AGB Nielsen Philippines' Nationwide Urban Television Audience Measurement People in television homes, the pilot episode of Follow Your Heart earned a 3.9% rating. The final episode scored a 4.7% rating.
