= Asian Television Content Corporation =

Philippine programming block

Asian Television Content Corporation (ATC Sports)
- Type: Television programming content provider
- Country: Philippines
- Owner: Rare Sales International, Inc. (parent company)
- Key people: Engr. Reynaldo Sanchez (President and CEO); Nikon Salimbagon (Production Head); Gerry Ledonio (Business Consultant)
- Launch date: June 2, 2014
- Dissolved: August 31, 2014 (as a programming block)
- Former names: AKTV on IBC (block) (2011-2013)
- Affiliation: Intercontinental Broadcasting Corporation
- Official website: ATC website

Asian Television Content Corporation (ATC) was a Filipino TV broadcast programming content provider and the major blocktimer of the Intercontinental Broadcasting Corporation, a government-sequestered TV network founded in 1960. Its offices are located at 85 Dona Justina St. Cor. Dalton St. Filinvest II, Brgy. Batasan Hills, Quezon City.

ATC produced specialty programs and specials aired on IBC-13 and People's Television Network. ATC Sports serves as an on-ground production division which organizes and produces on-the-air and on-ground sports content.

== History ==
ATCC was established last June 2013 as the network signed a blocktime agreement with IBC Channel 13. (that time, the blocktime deal with AKTV/TV5 expired due to high blocktime costs and low ratings) Before that, in April 2013, ATC together with ONE Fighting Championship and IBC agreed for the Free TV broadcast of the largest MMA organization in Asia. Therefore, ATC also partners with HubMedia, a Singaporean company that provides TV & movie program international distribution.

Last June 2, 2014, ATCC's primetime block for channel 13 was launched. Programs that will be aired on the primetime slot of 13 are Australian kid-oriented show Hi-5 and two Mexican telenovelas The Two Sides of Ana (Dalawang Mukha ni Ana) and La Teniente. Local programs Stoplight TV, reruns of Retro TV, Travel & Trade and Travel: Philippines, and foreign shows such as Animalia, Beyond Stardom, The Big Planet, Boost, Culture Flavors, Fame, Fashion Memoir, Gadgets & Gizmos, PBA D-League, and ONE FC also part of the programming line-up of ATC @ IBC 13.

However, on August 31, 2014, some of the programs of ATC have been discontinued due to poor ratings and loss of advertisers' support.

It was later relegated into a content provider and producer of different mainstream sports coverages, including the PBA Developmental League, NAASCU, ONE Championship, Philippine Tackle Football League, Universities and Colleges Basketball League (UCBL). and most recently, the Community Basketball Association (CBA – Pilipinas).

== See also ==
- Intercontinental Broadcasting Corporation
- List of Philippine media companies
- Philippine television networks
