= Jumbo Interactive =

Australian lottery company

Jumbo Interactive Limited
- Company type: Publicly listed entity
- Traded as: ASX: JIN
- Industry: Lotteries
- Founded: 1995
- Founder: Mike Veverka
- Headquarters: Brisbane, Australia
- Key people: Mike Veverka (Founder, CEO and Major Shareholder), David Barwick (Chairman)
- Products: Lotteries, Interactive Technology
- Revenue: A$24.1 million (FY2014)
- Subsidiaries: Oz lotteries
- Website: https://www.jumbointeractive.com/

Jumbo Interactive Limited is an Australian corporation and reseller of lottery games in Australia under agreement with government licensed lottery operator Tatts Group. Jumbo Interactive operates ozlotteries.com, one of Australia's largest e-commerce websites retailing Australian lotteries, such as Saturday Lotto, Oz Lotto and Powerball. Jumbo Interactive is a publicly listed corporation on the Australian Stock Exchange (ASX:JIN).

== History ==
Jumbo Interactive was founded by Mike Veverka in 1995 as a software developer and an Internet Service Provider in Queensland, Australia. In 1999, the company listed on the Australian Stock Exchange as Jumbomall.com

Focus shifted towards internet lotteries when the Interactive Gambling Act was passed by the Australian Parliament in 2001. Starting with smaller state-based charity lotteries, the company shifted to national lottery games with the acquisition of TMS Global Services in 2005. This business operated a lottery network since 1984 in various Pacific nations in agreement with Tattersalls. Jumbo acquired Manaccom, a software publisher, in 2007 and focus shifted towards the Internet and to the development of Oz Lotteries website, which continues to this day, having serviced in excess of 1.5 million customers.

In 2012, Robert Leitz acquired a >5% stake in Jumbo via his fund, iolite Partners, during a period of international expansion challenges. Jumbo’s market capitalization rose from A$50 million in 2012 to A$1.1 billion by mid-2019.

In May 2017 Tatts Group invested $15.6 million in Jumbo, and acquired a 15% stake.

In November 2019, Jumbo acquired the UK lottery manager Gatherwell Limited, which creates, launches and manages lottery systems.

In November 2020, Jumbo signed an agreement with Lotterywest to provide its online software platform and services for up to the next 10 years.

In November 2022, it was announced Jumbo had completed the acquisition of the UK-based external lottery manager and digital payments business, StarVale Group.

== Financial statements ==
At the end of financial year 2016, Jumbo Interactive's TTV (total transaction value) was $156 million. The company's website Oz lotteries continued its unbroken run customer growth since relaunch in 2005 with its database increasing by 10% even in a period of reduced jackpots.

Comparing like-for-like jackpots, sales are growing consistently, with the TTV for FY2017 reaching $142 million. The 2017 financial year saw Jumbo reach a net profit after tax of $7.6 million on a continuing basis.

In 2019 Jumbo's share price increased by 263% during the first 10 months of the year.

By November 2020 the company experienced a significant share price movement during the third quarter of the year on the ASX, rising to highs of AU$14.97 and falling to the lows of AU$10.63.
