= RadioTAB =

Australian racing sport radio station

- Brisbane, Queensland; Australia
- Broadcast area: Brisbane RA1 ()
- Frequency: 1008 kHz
- Branding: RadioTAB

Programming
- Language: English
- Format: Horse racing, sport

Ownership
- Owner: Tabcorp; (UBET Radio Pty Ltd)

History
- First air date: 2 September 1935 (as 4IP); 1992 as 4TAB
- Former call signs: 4IP (1935–1978); 4IO (1978–1989); 4IP (1989–1992)
- Call sign meaning: 4 for Queensland plus TAB for Totalisator Agency Board

Technical information
- Licensing authority: ACMA
- Transmitter coordinates: 27.379725°S 153.236194°E
- Repeaters: various in Queensland, Tasmania, South Australia, and the Northern Territory, including 89.7 MHz Beaudesert (5 kW ERP)

Links
- Public licence information: Profile
- Website: tab.com.au

RadioTAB is a radio station primarily covering horse and greyhound racing in Australia and internationally, operated by Tabcorp, which operates the Totalisator Agency Boards based in Queensland, Tasmania, South Australia and Northern Territory. RadioTAB's studios are in Brisbane City.

== History ==
4TAB commenced 1 January 1992. The official opening was conducted on air on 23 January 1992. Its existence prompted 4BC to switch to a country music format. Buying its own radio station instead of airign races on other stations saved TAB $1 million annually in costs. By 1993, 16 FM radio stations in regional Queensland relayed its programs.

Prior to the licence being bought by the TAB, the station was known as 4IP. It commenced in 1935. Between 1965 and 1977, 4IP had a most successful hit music format in Brisbane, and was aligned with its Melbourne and Sydney cousins 3XY and 2SM. In the 1980s, FM radio started making inroads into 4IP's popularity; it changed its call sign to 4IO and adopted a slogan of Radio 10, then Stereo 10 and later "Lite 'n Easy 1008". The sale of 4IP's sister stations in regional Queensland brought in one-time cash but left the station more vulnerable.

In 1999, the businessman George Chapman was forced to resign as a director of Network 10 television when the Australian Broadcasting Authority ruled that he could not serve at Ten and as chair of the Queensland TAB without breaking media ownership rules.

== Programming ==
The station's breakfast show airs daily from 5am, providing listeners with the latest sporting news and results from a variety of sports and codes.

The station's morning shows "Racing Active" is presented from 8:30am Monday to Friday (AEST), and "Select Racing" from 7am on Saturdays and Sundays. The programs feature interviews and racing news, as well as previews of race meetings being covered on that day. It also features racing broadcasts from Australian and international venues when scheduled. Special feature or code specific segments for Harness and Greyhound racing are also featured.

The majority of RadioTAB's programming is a continuous broadcast of thoroughbred, harness and greyhound racing. This occurs daily from 11:30am. While overnight from 2am, a shared programme is taken from Sky Racing.

Following the merger of Tatts Group, which operated RadioTAB for its jurisdictions (its wagering services then styled UBET), with fellow wagering and gaming operator Tabcorp, RadioTAB is now a sister station to Sydney-based Sky Sports Radio. Both stations have retained their separate identities as of 2021.

== See also ==
- Sky Sports Radio, the Tabcorp-owned racing station in New South Wales and the Australian Capital Territory
- RSN Racing & Sport, a racing station operating in Victoria
