= TattsLotto =

Australian lottery game

- Region: Australia
- First draw: 1972
- Website: thelott.com

TattsLotto is a weekly lottery game drawn on Saturday nights in Victoria, Tasmania, and the Northern Territory in Australia. The same game is known as Saturday Lotto in New South Wales, the ACT and Western Australia, X Lotto in South Australia and Gold Lotto in Queensland.

This lottery game offers a multi-million-dollar division one prize pool that is shared among players who hold entries that match the numbers drawn.

Before TattsLotto, official lottery games in Australia were predominantly raffle-style games. It was the first European-format "lotto" style lottery in Australia.

== History ==
The first TattsLotto draw was televised by Melbourne television station HSV7 on 22 June 1972, and was hosted by David Johnston and Lucy Kiraly.

It is drawn every Saturday night and draws were telecast on Channel Seven in Melbourne, Prime7 in Southern NSW & Victoria, and the Seven Network & Network 10 affiliated Southern Cross Television in Tasmania until the mid 2000s.

Draws are now broadcast every Saturday night at approximately 8:30pm (AEST) on 7two and affiliated regional stations.

The game was originally a product of Tatts (Tattersall’s Sweeps Pty Ltd), part of Tatts Group’s Australian lottery brands.

Since 1 June 2016, TattsLotto has been promoted under the master brand The Lott. From 1 June 2022 The Lott is owned by The Lottery Corporation.

== The game ==
Six winning numbers and two supplementary numbers are drawn from the one barrel of 45 numbers.

To play one game, the player chooses six numbers between 1 and 45. Players can choose to play multiple games on the one ticket, including 12 games, 18 games, 24 games, 36 games etc.

Players can choose their own numbers for each game, or allow the lottery terminal to randomly generate numbers, known as a QuickPick entry.

To win division one, players must match all six winning numbers in a single game on their entry.

Winnings are calculated across six divisions with an estimated division one prize pool of $6 million.

However, some Superdraws offer a division one prize pool of $20 million, while Megadraws, usually held around New Year’s Eve, can offer a division one prize pool of $30 million or more.

== Odds: 1 Game - 6/45 balls ==
Division	Category	Odds based on 1 game
1st Division	6 winning Numbers	8,145,060:1
2nd Division	5 winning Numbers + 1 supplementary number	678,755:1
3rd Division	5 winning Numbers	36,689:1
4th Division	4 winning Numbers	733:1
5th Division	3 winning Numbers + 1 supplementary number	298:1
6th Division	3 winning Numbers	53:1

== See also ==
- Lotteries in Australia
