= Powerball (Australia) =

Lottery in Australia

- Region: Australia
- First draw: 23 May 1996
- Highest jackpot: $200 million
- Website: www.thelott.com

Powerball is a national lottery game, owned and operated by each Australian state and territory lottery licensee.

This includes those licensees under The Lottery Corporation's The Lott lottery brand, such as New South Wales Lotteries in New South Wales and the Australian Capital Territory, Tattersalls in Victoria, Tasmania and the Northern Territory, Golden Casket in Queensland and South Australian Lotteries in South Australia. The government-owned Lotterywest owns and operates the lottery game in Western Australia.

Powerball in Australia started in 1996 as a Tattersall's two-barrel, lotto-type gambling game, four years after the game of the same name had started in the USA. At the time, five balls were drawn from the first barrel, which contained 45 balls, then the single Powerball number was drawn from a barrel also containing 45 balls, with the odds of winning the top prize 1 in 54,979,155.

The highest Australian Powerball jackpot was A$200 million on 1 February 2024 and was shared by two ticket holders. The biggest individual Powerball jackpot won by one ticket is A$150 million, won in May 2024. Most jackpot wins are not shared by multiple tickets. A minimum of three numbers is needed, those being two regular numbers plus the Powerball. Winners always collect in lump sum parimutuel winnings.

The game was first revamped on 1 March 2013; drawing six regular numbers from 40 balls plus a Powerball using 20 balls decreasing the odds of winning the top prize to 1 in 76,767,600. This also allowed the introduction of an 8th prize division (two main numbers plus the Powerball). Other changes include an increase of 10c per play, and the introduction of an option (QuickHit40) which "wheel" the 40 Powerballs although not guaranteeing a prize.

The current Powerball format was introduced on 19 April 2018, using two Smartplay Halogen II draw machines with the intention of offering bigger jackpots and creating more overall winners. In each draw, seven winning numbers are selected from a pool of 35, while the additional Powerball continues to be drawn from a separate pool of 20 balls. This format substantially decreased the odds of winning the top prize to 1 in 134,490,400. A new, 9th prize division was added. To enable the new format, the cost of Powerball entries was increased.

== Records ==
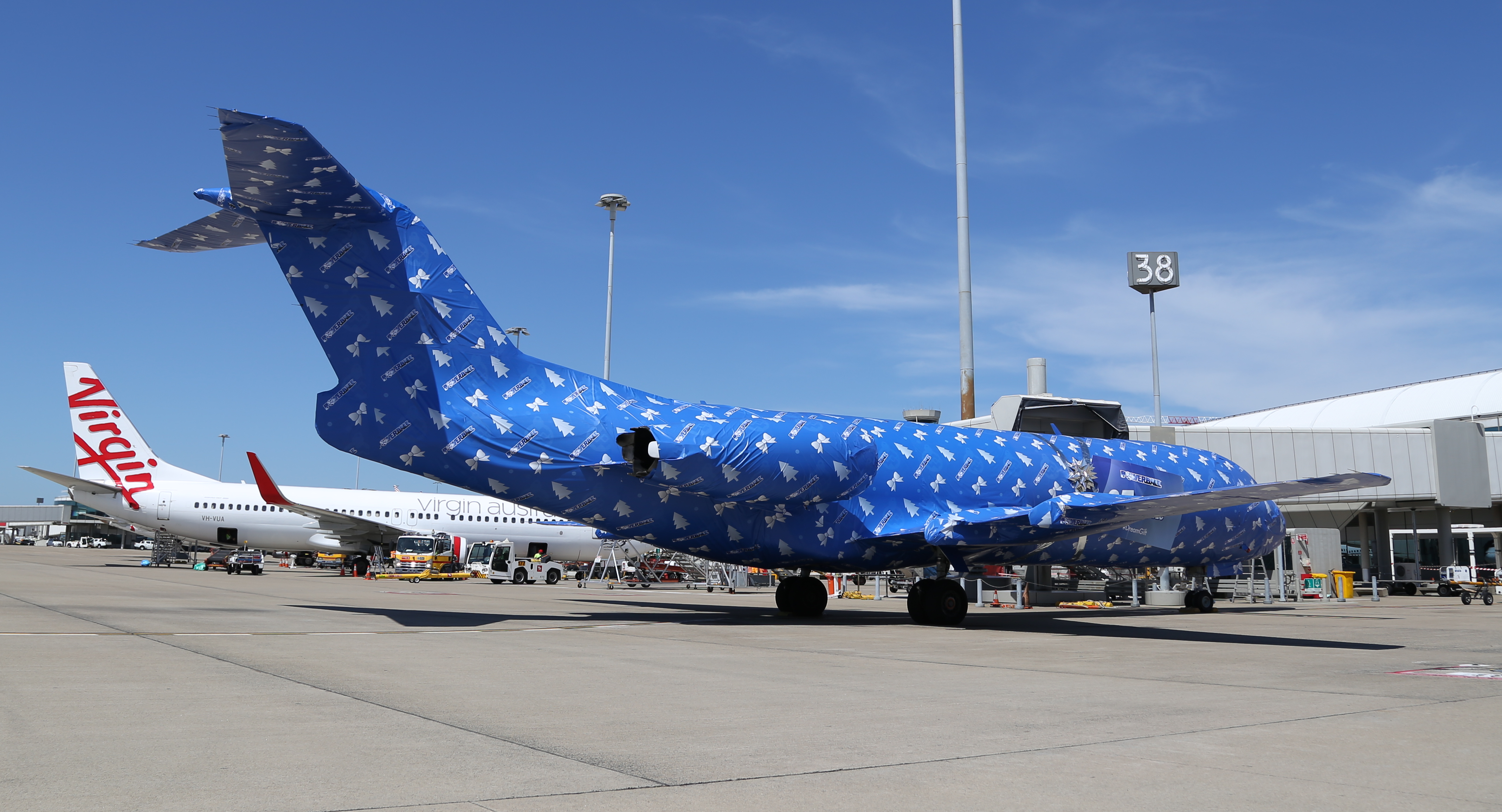
An Alliance Airlines Fokker 70 at Brisbane Airport, wrapped in Powerball wrapping paper (December 2016)

On 1 March 2007, the Division 1 pool was $33 million; it was the largest Australian lottery prize won.

On 5 June 2008, the Division 1 pool was $58,737,207.41; then the largest prize pool in Australian history to that point (since eclipsed several times, including by Oz Lotto in 2012, which had a Division 1 pool of $100 million.)

On 30 July 2009, the Division 1 pool was $80 million, the largest Australian Powerball pool until August 2018. There were two Division 1 winners in the drawing.

On 21 August 2014, the Division 1 pool was $70 million. Two winners walked away with $35 million each.

On 28 May 2015, the Division 1 pool was $50 million, won by a single ticket. The winner was a woman from Canberra.

On 23 July 2015, the Division 1 pool was $50 million, won by a single ticket. The winner was a woman from Western Australia.

On 7 January 2016, the Division 1 pool was $70 million, won by a single ticket. The winner was from Queensland.

On 11 January 2018, the Division 1 pool was $55 million, won by a single ticket in the Melbourne town of Brunswick. The prize went unclaimed for almost six months but was finally claimed anonymously just seven days before it was set to be transferred to the Victorian State Revenue Office. In Victoria, the amount of time someone has to claim a prize is unlimited, however if it is not claimed within six months, it will go to the Victorian State Revenue Office where the winner can claim it at any time.

On 16 August 2018, the Division 1 pool was $100 million, surpassing the previous record for Powerball and equalling the Oz Lotto record. The Division 1 pool was split between two winners, one from Melbourne, one from Sydney. On 17 January 2019, a single person from Sydney won $107 million, making it the largest individual lottery win in Australian history.

As of 18 July 2019, the Division 1 prize was $110 million, split by three winners. It was the largest ever division one prize, in Australia's history.

No one won the $100 million jackpot on 12 September 2019, thus the prize climbed to $150 million on the 19 December 2019, which was shared by three winners, winning $50 million each.

No one won the $150 million jackpot on 25 January 2024, thus the prize climbed to a record Australian Division 1 prize of $200 million, which was drawn on 1 February 2024 and shared by two winners, who each won $100 million.

== Original Odds: 5/45 Regular Balls, 1/45 Powerball (prior to March 2013) ==
Division	Category	Odds based on 1 game
1st Division	5 Numbers + Powerball	54,979,155:1
2nd Division	5 Numbers	1,249,526:1
3rd Division	4 Numbers + Powerball	274,896:1
4th Division	3 Numbers + Powerball	7,049:1
5th Division	4 Numbers	6248:1
6th Division	2 Numbers + Powerball	556:1
7th Division	3 Numbers	160:1
Any Prize		120:1

== Odds: 6/40 Regular Balls, 1/20 Powerball (prior to 13 April 2018) ==
Division	Category	Odds based on 1 game
1st Division	6 Numbers + Powerball	76,767,600:1
2nd Division	6 Numbers	4,040,400:1
3rd Division	5 Numbers + Powerball	376,320:1
4th Division	5 Numbers	19,812:1
5th Division	4 Numbers + Powerball	9,132:1
6th Division	3 Numbers + Powerball	648:1
7th Division	4 Numbers	480:1
8th Division	2 Numbers + Powerball	110:1
Any Prize		78:1

== New Odds: 7/35 Regular Balls, 1/20 Powerball (from 13 April 2018) ==
Division	Category	Odds based on 1 game
1st Division	7 Numbers + Powerball	134,490,400:1
2nd Division	7 Numbers	7,078,443:1
3rd Division	6 Numbers + Powerball	686,176:1
4th Division	6 Numbers	36,115:1
5th Division	5 Numbers + Powerball	16,943:1
6th Division	4 Numbers + Powerball	1,173:1
7th Division	5 Numbers	892:1
8th Division	3 Numbers + Powerball	188:1
9th Division	2 Numbers + Powerball	66:1
Any Prize		44:1

== See also ==
- Lotteries in Australia
