= Totalisator Agency Board =

Gambling agencies in Australia, New Zealand and South Africa

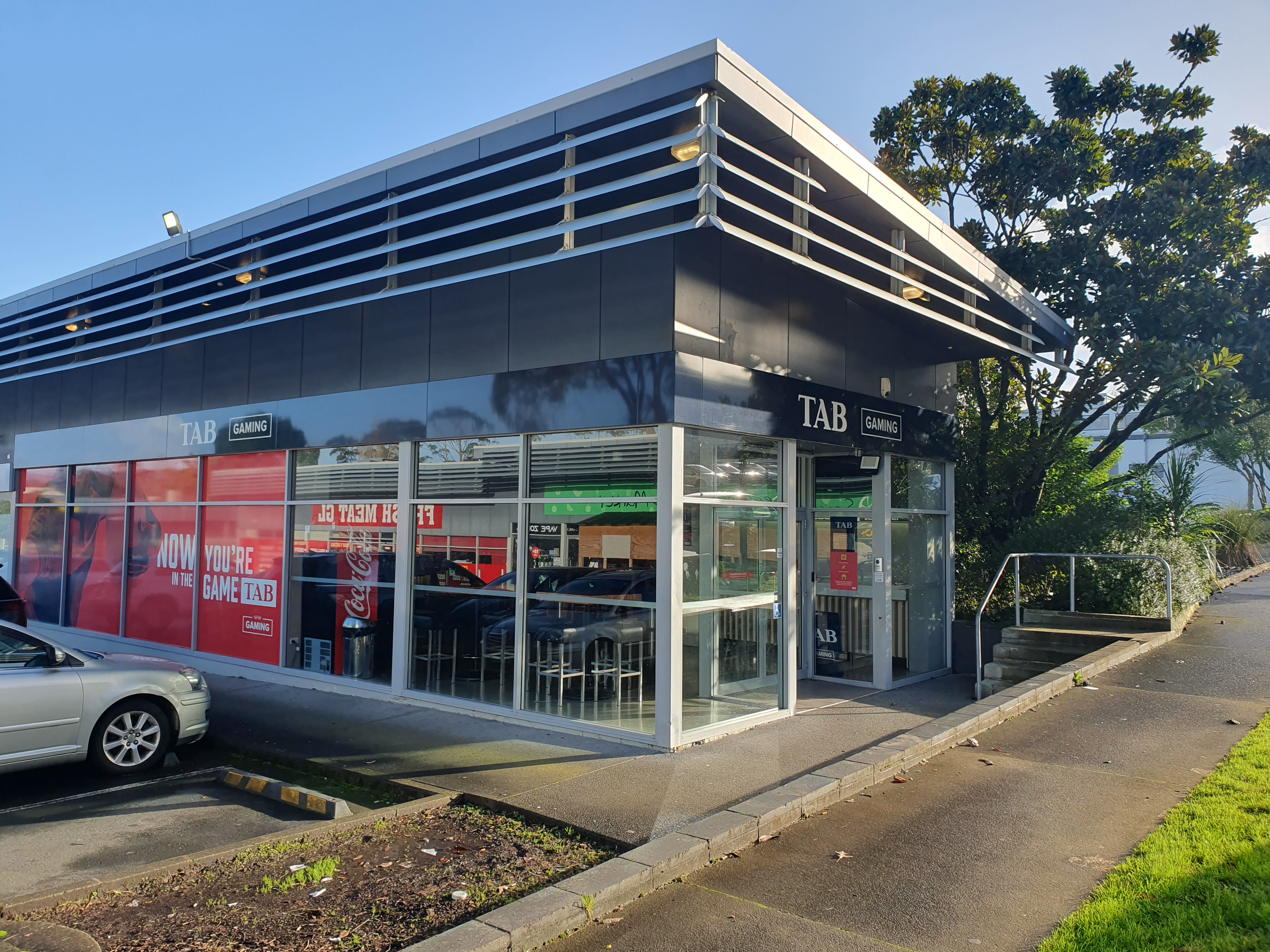
A TAB store in Glen Eden, West Auckland, New Zealand

The Totalisator Agency Board (Note: This was by far the most common expansion of the name, however it varied slightly in some states. For instance, TAB Queensland was known by the full name of the Totalisator Administration Board while under government ownership.), universally shortened to TAB or T.A.B., is the name given to monopoly totalisator organisations in Australia, New Zealand and South Africa. They operate betting shops and online betting. They were originally government owned but, in Australia, most have been privatised. In Victoria, for instance, the Victorian Totalisator Agency Board began operating in March 1961 as a state enterprise, and was privatised in 1994.

== Australia ==
=== History and development ===
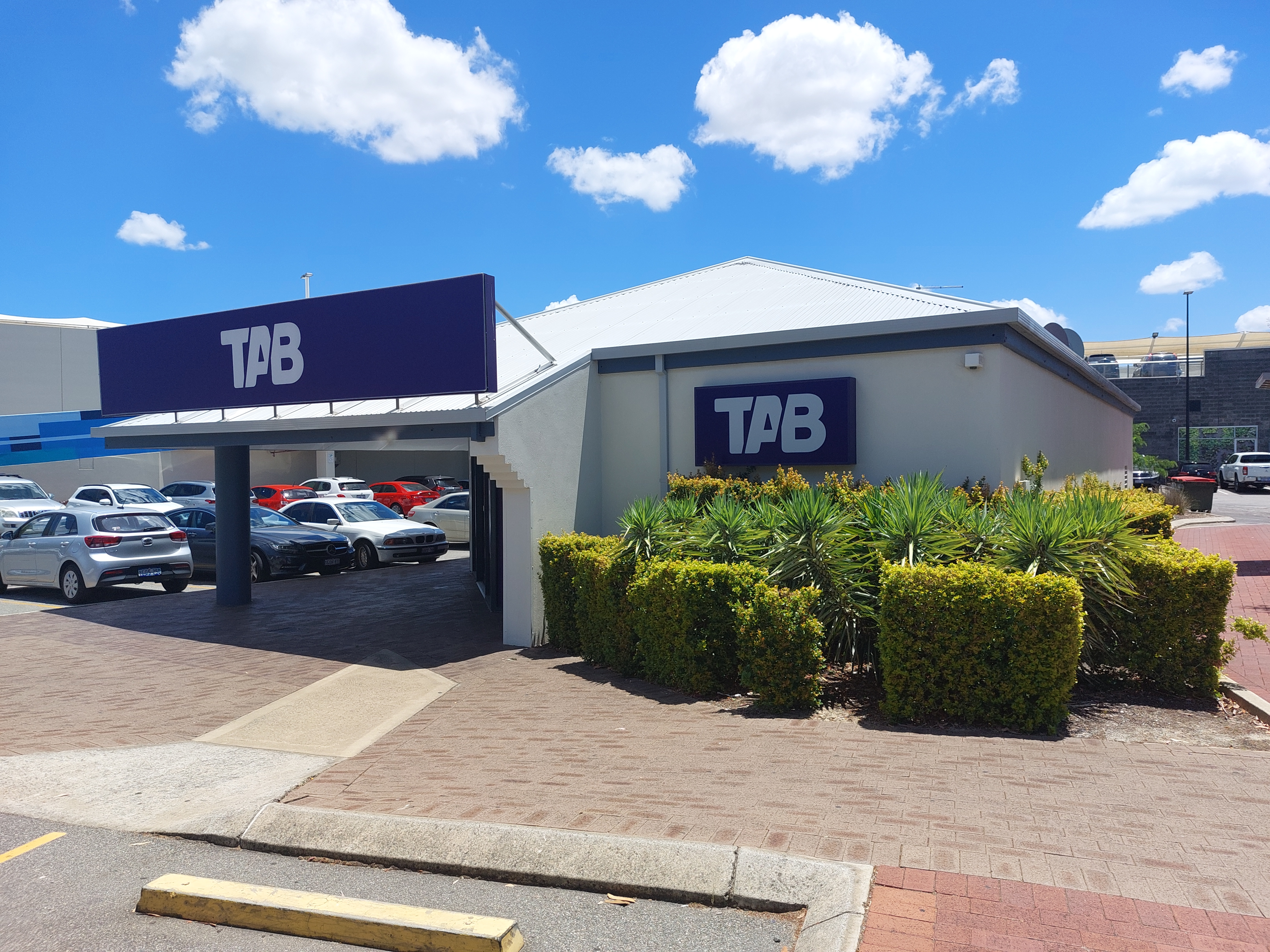
A TAB in Karawara, Perth

Originally having been run as state government agencies, most Australian TABs have been progressively privatised, beginning with Victoria in 1994 (becoming Tabcorp), and following with New South Wales in 1998 (becoming Tab Limited) and Queensland in 1999 (becoming TAB Queensland Limited). TAB Queensland later purchased the Northern Territory and South Australian TABs from their respective governments, becoming UniTAB Limited.

Tabcorp and Tab Limited merged in 2004, followed by UniTAB merging with lotteries operator Tattersall's (to become Tatts Group) in 2006. Tatts Group later purchased TOTE Tasmania in 2011 while Tabcorp bought ACT TAB in 2014, both from their respective governments. These privatisations leave the Western Australian TAB as the only remaining government-owned totalisator.

The online operations of TABs in Queensland, South Australia, Northern Territory and Tasmania were initially re-branded as TattsBet following the Tatts Group merger. A major further rebranding to UBET in 2015 saw the previous TAB brands replaced, including at venue level. Following the merger of Tatts Group with Tabcorp, UBET outlets were rebranded to the Tabcorp "TAB" branding in 2019.

The Western Australia TAB was established in 1961 and is still state run, currently through state racing regulator Racing & Wagering Western Australia. Although TAB agencies in WA are generally still branded "TAB", the overarching brand "TABtouch" was introduced in 2013 operations (replacing former online brands such as TAB Ozbet), to further distinguish from Tabcorp's brand. Attempts to privatise TABtouch have so far proven unsuccessful, the most recent attempt terminated in 2022.

=== Current betting provision ===
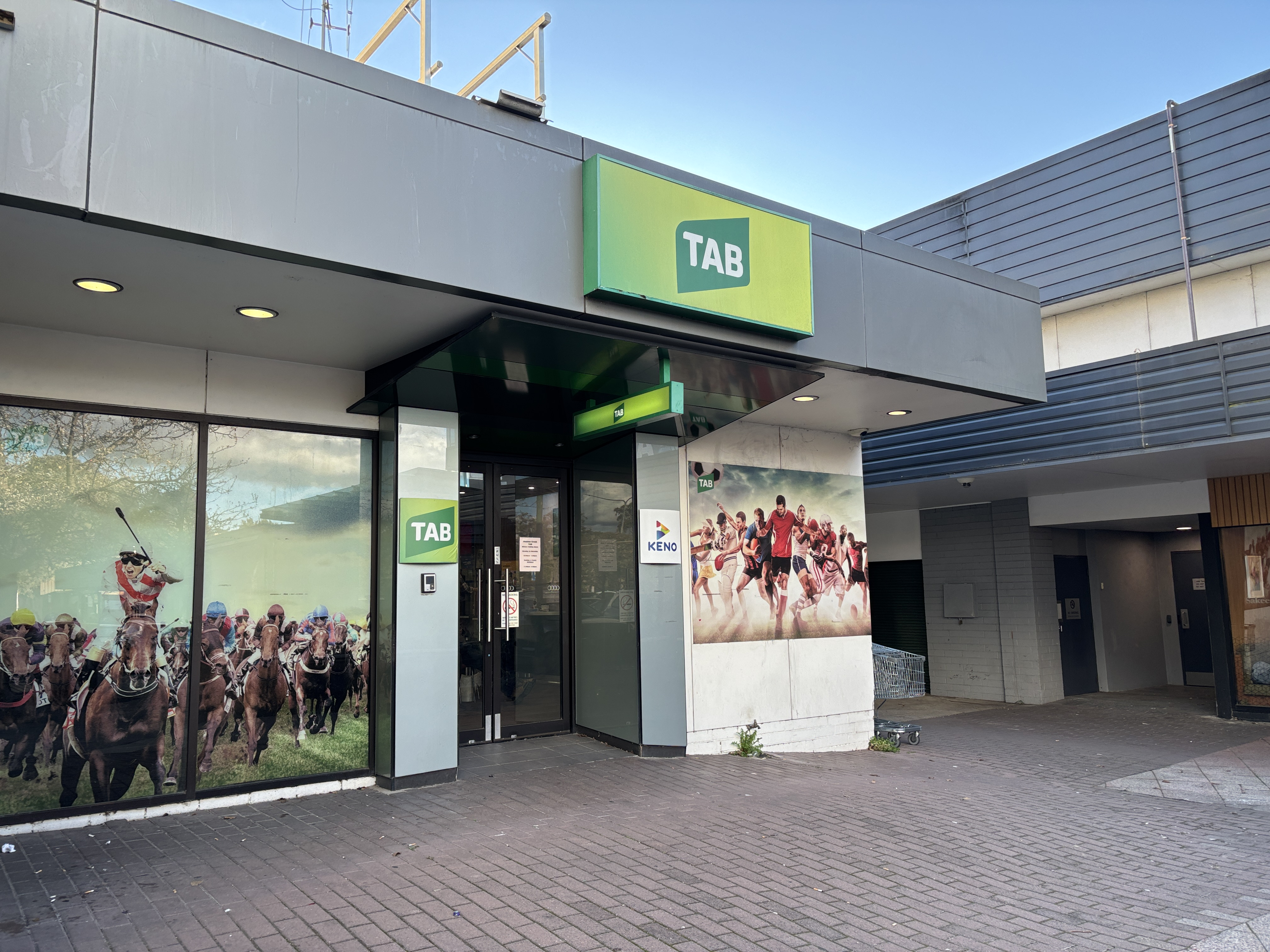
A TAB outlet in Canberra

Although the state TABs are now all owned by Tabcorp except in Western Australia, due to legislative and other reasons three separate totalisator pools continue to exist in Australia, running mostly along historic operator lines:

- SuperTAB (later S-TAB) for Victoria, the Australian Capital Territory and Western Australia (and previously Tasmania before its acquisition by Tatts Group);
- UTAB, for the Tabcorp-acquired markets previously owned by UBET, in Queensland, South Australia, the Northern Territory and Tasmania; and
- a separate New South Wales-only pool.

Wagering in Tasmania once contributed to the SuperTAB pool, however following the sale of TOTE Tasmania to Tatts Group, bets from Tasmania were moved to the TattsBet (now UTAB) pool.

Ironically, the presence of three pools have permitted previously fixed-odds bookmakers, competitors to the TAB, to offer products that derive their returns from various totalisator starting prices (typically as best or middle dividend of the three, depending on the bet type), which provides an alternative to SP bookmaking, which is illegal in Australia.

Limited commingling with international pools (including from the New Zealand TAB; see below) does occur, although generally only with one Australian pool (typically SuperTAB). A notable exception is Hong Kong Jockey Club racing, where all three TAB pools commingle with the Hong Kong pool on certain bet types..

Australian TAB operators in modern times continue to provide totalisator betting on thoroughbred, harness and greyhound racing, as well as fixed-odds horse and sports betting. Prior to the latter becoming available in the 1990s and 2000s, totalisator football pools based on rugby league and Australian football were operated in various states; these continue to be operated in New South Wales (covering the National Rugby League), Victoria (covering the Australian Football League), and Western Australia (covering the AFL and additionally Western Australian Football League matches). The number of stand-alone retail outlets has been steadily declining with the advent of integration of TAB services into hotels and clubs, as well as online betting.

=== Media ===
The TABs have extensive radio networks in Australia, except in Victoria (racing coverage instead provided via RSN 927, operated by Racing Victoria). All these networks share the National Racing Service, a continuous broadcast of thoroughbred, harness and greyhound racing. This makes up the bulk of these networks' content. Collectively, these networks own more radio licences than any other group in Australia – however, their terrestrial coverage is less than the ABC, as they primarily run on low-power narrowcast licences that have tiny wattages.

Racing coverage still operates, however, on commercial licences in Victoria (RSN, via 3UZ in Melbourne, 3BT in Ballarat and 3SR in Shepparton), Sydney (Sky Sports Radio, via 2KY - having been previously acquired by the NSW TAB via Sky Channel) and Brisbane (RadioTAB, via 4TAB, formerly 4IP).

Tabcorp own a racing television network in Sky Racing; originally acquired by the New South Wales TAB in 1998. This was originally provided (as Sky Channel) to hotels and clubs via satellite, later extending to home subscription TV platforms such as Foxtel, and eventually expanded to two channels to accommodate an increased racing schedule. Sky Racing shows virtually all racing coverage covered by TAB tote markets, although some of this content is now sublicensed from entities such as Racing.com.

Due to Australian anti-siphoning law surrounding the Melbourne Cup, the rights to that carnival are separately sold by the Victoria Racing Club, with Sky Racing in the past sublicensing races from a free-to-air TV broadcaster (most recently Network 10 as of 2023). From 2024, Tabcorp holds a direct stake in the VRC carnival rights, on-selling content to the Nine Network to satisfy free-to-air broadcast requirements.

== New Zealand ==
The TAB in New Zealand is the sole legal betting operator located in New Zealand. Bookmaking had been made illegal in New Zealand in 1911, replaced initially by on-course totalisators at thoroughbred and harness racing tracks, and later expanded with authorisation of a TAB in 1949. Notably, modern greyhound racing did not obtain totalisator betting until much later, with on-course so-called "equalisator" betting - with wagering permitted on a random drawn greyhound – permitted effective 1 August 1972, eventually leading to off-course TAB coverage in 1981.

At times the government entity operating the TAB has also regulated the racing codes, such as the 2003 introduction of the New Zealand Racing Board. Following reforms to the operation of the racing industry in New Zealand in 2020, the organisation - now relieved of its regulation of the codes - is once again known as TAB New Zealand. The management rights for TAB New Zealand have since been franchised to multinational gaming entity Entain effective June 2023.

=== Media ===
TAB New Zealand's television service is TAB Trackside, consisting of two channels (previously separately branded Trackside and TAB TV). It commenced in 1992 as Action TV, assuming the Trackside name a year later, and originally operated as a single channel via UHF television - a method also used to broadcast the initial (pre-satellite) incarnation of New Zealand's Sky. However, unlike Sky's channel, Trackside was screened "in the clear" - meaning most New Zealanders could sit at their TV with a standard UHF aerial and watch racing. Since the wind-down and closure of the Sky UHF service, TAB Trackside on conventional television has now been limited to subscription platforms, originally via Sky (including Sky TV services formerly delivered through TelstraClear/Vodafone-owned Hybrid fibre cable in certain cities), and more recently also via the streaming service Spark Sport.

The former AM/FM radio service was most recently branded TAB Trackside Radio (previously Radio Trackside). The service had a history tracing back to Radio Pacific, and was later a part-time simulcast of Trackside TV on stations operated by MediaWorks New Zealand (namely the successors to Radio Pacific in BSport and later Radio Live Sport). The stations were sold to the TAB itself by MediaWorks in 2015.

The Radio Trackside network of frequencies was closed in April 2020, at the start of the COVID-19 pandemic in New Zealand as racing was suspended. The stations were sold later that year to the Australian Sports Entertainment Network, which was used to launch general sport radio station SENZ – a localised version of a format used on their stations in Australia (such as SEN 1116). Unlike stations that previously took Radio Trackside part-time, SENZ does not transmit TAB Trackside content; however SEN continue to host an audio stream of TAB Trackside TV. SENZ was sold back to the newly-franchised TAB New Zealand effective February 2024, with SEN retaining commercial and content provision arrangements with the network.

== South Africa ==
The current totalisator service in South Africa is provided by two companies, who commingle their bets into a nation-wide pool:

- The TAB branded service, run since late 2021 by primary racing operator 4Racing, which operates the totalisator in all provinces except KwaZulu-Natal, and
- The TABgold branded operation of Gold Circle Racing, the operator of thoroughbred racing in the KwaZulu-Natal province.

The larger TAB operated by 4Racing was previously operated by Phumelela Gaming. Phumelela went into bankruptcy protection in May 2020, partly as a result of the COVID-19 pandemic in South Africa, however officially continued to operate the TAB while under bankruptcy supervision, until 4Racing was granted operating licences from the Gauteng Gambling Board in November 2021.

These services generally provide totalisator bets on both horse racing and football, as well as fixed-odds sports betting and online casino games. In KwaZulu-Natal, "TAB" has latterly been backronymed for the latter to "Track And Ball", reflecting the increased scope of the TAB beyond operating a horse racing totalisator.

Both TAB operators also provide television services for South African and international racing (4Racing broadcasting Racing 240 and Global Racing 1, Gold Circle providing Gallop TV) which are made available via various satellite services (4Racing's channels being available on DStv) and online streaming.

== See also ==
- Thoroughbred racing in New Zealand
- Harness racing in New Zealand
