= The Lottery Office =

Australian online lottery operator

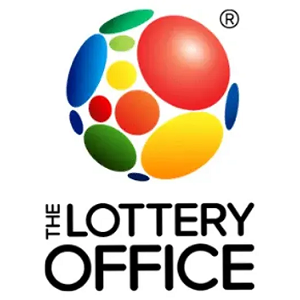
- Trade name: The Lottery Office
- Company type: Private
- Industry: Australian lottery
- Founded: January 2003; 23 years ago
- Headquarters: Darwin, Australia and Gold Coast, Australia
- Area served: Australia
- Products: Licensed seller of lottery tickets and operator of online lottery products
- Parent: Global Players Network Pty Ltd (GPN) (2003–present)
- Website: www.lotteryoffice.com.au

The Lottery Office is an Australian online lottery operator licensed by the Government of the Northern Territory. It allows Australians to play to win from the draws of the largest lotteries in the world, providing access to both international lottery draw products (such as US Powerball and Mega Millions) and internal Australian-operated lottery games (FutureBall). Its parent company, Global Players Network Pty Ltd (GPN), has been licensed and regulated to operate lotteries since 2003.

== Overview ==
The Lottery Office is licensed in the Northern Territory, Australia and allows players to win from the draws of foreign lotteries. The Lottery Office allows players to buy tickets from The Lottery Office; the company then purchases matching tickets in the relevant overseas lottery draw. Combos, Syndicates and matching tickets can be played in the following international lotteries:

- USA Power Lotto (US Powerball)
- USA Mega Lotto (US Mega Millions)
- European Millions (EuroMillions)
- European Jackpot (Eurojackpot)
- Italian Super Jackpot (SuperEnalotto)
- La Primitiva (El Gordo de la Primitiva)
- Irish Lotto (Irish National Lottery)
- UK Lotto (UK National Lottery)

In addition to its international lottery model, the company has expanded its offering to include internally operated lottery games. In 2026, it introduced FutureBall, a lottery conducted under an approved licence in the Northern Territory.

A 29 year old university graduate from Brisbane won $1.89 million AUD in the USA Power Lotto draw in September 2025. She secured the Division 2 prize and, by selecting the multiplier option, she doubled her winnings. In July 2021, a Sydney restaurateur won $1.656 million AUD in USA Power Lotto.

=== FutureBall ===
In 2026, The Lottery Office introduced FutureBall, an online lottery product aimed at Australian players. Unlike the company's traditional model of matching tickets to overseas lottery draws, FutureBall is The Lottery Office’s first non-matched lottery conducted under an approved licence by the Northern Territory Government of Australia. FutureBall is a fixed-prize lottery featuring a top prize of A$1 million. Draws are held twice weekly, on Tuesdays and Fridays, with entries closing at 7.30pm AEST prior to each draw.

The game uses a dual-number pool format in which players select six numbers from a pool of 34, along with one additional number (the "FutureBall") from a pool of three. There are four prize divisions, with the first division awarded for matching all six main numbers plus the FutureBall. A distinguishing feature of FutureBall is that each possible number combination for the top prize is issued only once per draw. This ensures that, when there is a winner, the A$1 million prize is not shared.

Lower prize divisions are paid from the allocated prize pool like other lotteries, and split between entries that match the required numbers.

FutureBall is conducted under the regulatory control of the Northern Territory Government under strict lottery game rules and operational controls.

=== Regulation ===
In 2014, the Government of the Northern Territory of Australia issued Global Players Network an Internet Gaming Licence, which is licensed in Australia to market international lottery products online. Being the parent company, The Lottery Office is licensed via Global Players Network.

To meet all regulatory requirements set out by the Northern Territory Government, lottery companies regularly undertake financial and operational audits. The Lottery Office additionally receives ongoing and contemporaneous auditing of customer orders against matching tickets purchased, from the Northern Territory Government. Requirements include responsible gambling measures for the safety of all players, enforcement of Australia's gambling age, and features such as weekly deposit limits, self-exclusion and take a break functions.

In June 2018, the Australian Federal Government passed legislation to ban 'lottery betting' under the revised Interactive Gambling Act. It was intended to make it illegal for Australians to bet on the outcome of foreign lotteries, but a case before the Supreme Court of New South Wales ruled that such bets were legal on the basis that the players were betting on an event occurring rather than betting on a game. However, as The Lottery Office does not participate in lottery betting, as it does not allow players to bet on the outcome of a draw, it was not prohibited by the law.

=== Sponsorships and partnerships ===
The Lottery Office is the principal partner of the Gold Coast Titans and the official lottery partner of the Gold Coast Suns and Venues NSW (Western Sydney Stadium, Sydney Football Stadium (2022), and Newcastle International Sports Centre).

The Lottery Office sponsors a number of charities, including:

- Sea World Foundation
- Gold Coast Hospital Foundation
- Sydney Children's Hospital Foundation
- Assistance Dogs Australia
- Canteen Australia

== See also ==
- Lotteries in Australia
