= NSW Lotteries =

Agency overview
- Formed: 1931
- Jurisdiction: Government of New South Wales
- Parent agency: The Lottery Corporation
- Website: thelott.com

New South Wales Lotteries, (usually marketed and referred to as NSW Lotteries or the Lott) is a corporation owned by the Government of New South Wales in Australia. Since 2 March 2010, it has been operated by Tatts Group Limited under a 40-year exclusive licence. It runs games of chance through a network of agents, most of which are newsagencies. It falls under the government portfolio of Gaming and Racing and is governed by the Public Lotteries Act 1996.

== Divisions ==
On 1 June 2016 the NSW Lotteries brand became one of the four Tatts Group jurisdictional brands to be incorporated into a national lottery brand called ‘the Lott’. The other brands being Tatts Lottery, Golden Casket and South Australian Lotteries.

NSW Lotteries runs some of its lotteries itself and syndicates a number of others run by interstate lottery organisations. The lotteries offered are:

- Lotto
  - There are three Lotto draws weekly, occurring on Monday, Wednesday and Saturday evenings. Although the three are marketed identically by NSW Lotteries, the Saturday Lotto draw is a national lottery run by Tatts Group Limited and syndicated by NSW Lotteries. It is known elsewhere in Australia as Tattslotto or Gold Lotto. The Monday & Wednesday Lotto draws are run by NSW Lotteries and are available across Australia except Queensland. Although the draws are played identically, all requiring players to select six numbers from a possible 45, Saturday Lotto/Tattslotto is more expensive to enter due to its larger prize pool.
- Lotto Strike
- Lucky Lotteries
  - The 'Lucky Lotteries' brand is used to market the $2 Jackpot Lottery and the $5 Jackpot Lottery, which are separate although similar games.
- Oz Lotto (run by Tatts Group and syndicated by NSW Lotteries)
- Powerball (run by Tatts Group and syndicated by NSW Lotteries)
  - Set For Life is a new NSW Lotteries game launched on 3 August 2015.

NSW Lotteries also sells various scratchcard games, under the brand 'Instant Scratch-its'.

== See also ==
- Lotteries in Australia
