= The Lottery Corporation =

Australian online lottery operator

- Trade name: The Lottery Corporation
- Type: Public company
- Industry: Australian lottery
- Founded: January 2022; 4 years ago
- Headquarters: Brisbane, Sydney, and Melbourne
- Area served: Australia
- Products: Licensed seller of lottery tickets and operator of online lottery products
- Website: www.thelotterycorporation.com

The Lottery Corporation (ASX: TLC) is an Australian online lottery operator that runs major state and national lotteries, including Powerball and Oz Lotto. It operates in all states and territories of Australia apart from in the state of Western Australia. Its brand names are The Lott and Keno.

== History ==
The Tatts Group, formed in 2007 from Tattersalls, acquired NSW Lotteries in 2012 and South Australian Lotteries in 2012. In 2016, it launched a new brand, "The Lott". 2017, Tabcorp combined with Tatts Group Limited to create a group branded Tabcorp.

In December 2021, Tabcorp demerged its Lotteries and Keno businesses and rebranded as The Lottery Corporation. In May 2022, Tabcorp shareholders approved the scheme of arrangement for the demerger.

The Lottery Corporation commenced trading on the ASX on 24 May 2022 as TLC, and floated on the ASX on 1 June 2022 as TLC, with a market value of $10.5 billion. The official launch of the Lottery Corporation took place in June 2022.

== Description ==
The Lottery Corporation operates the exclusive lotteries licences previously held by Tabcorp, including the brands The Lott and Keno. It is the primary licensed operator in all Australian states and territories except Western Australia, (Note: In Western Australia, Lotterywest is owned by the Government of Western Australia.) and operates national draw games under "The Lott" brand, which encompasses Tatts Group, NSW Lotteries, Golden Casket (Queensland), and SA Lotteries. It operates Powerball, Oz Lotto, and Saturday Lotto. Owing to licensing regulations, the business has very limited direct competition.

It has offices in Brisbane, Sydney, and Melbourne.

== People ==
As of September 2026 Wayne Pickup is the managing director and CEO of The Lottery Corporation. Doug McTaggert chairs the board.

In September 2026, Joe Hawkins was appointed leader of creative strategy.

== See also ==
- Lotteries in Australia
- Gambling in Australia
