= List of acts of the Parliament of Western Australia from 1990 =

This is a list of acts of the Parliament of Western Australia for the year 1990.

== 1990 ==
Short title, or popular name	Citation	Royal assent
Long title
Parks and Reserves Amendment Act 1990	No. 1 of 1990	14 June 1990
An Act to amend the Parks and Reserves Act 1895. (Note: Parks and Reserves Act 1895 (59 Vict. No. 30))
Lotteries Commission Act 1990	No. 16 of 1990	31 July 1990
An Act to provide for the continuation of the Lotteries Commission and the conduct of lotteries, games of lotto and soccer football pools, to repeal the Lotteries (Control) Act 1954 (Note: Lotteries (Control) Act 1954 (No. 18)) and the Lotto Act 1981, (Note: Lotto Act 1981 (No. 102)) and for related purposes.
WAGH Financial Obligations Act 1990	No. 55 of 1990	17 December 1990
An Act to appropriate the General Loan and Capital Works Fund for a charge during the year ended 30 June 1990 under the Treasurer's Advance Authorization Act 1989 in relation to Western Australian Government Holdings Limited.
Heritage of Western Australia Act 1990	No. 103 of 1990	22 December 1990
An Act to provide for, and to encourage, the conservation of places which have significance to the cultural heritage in the State, to establish the Heritage Council of Western Australia, and for related purposes.
	No. X of 1990	
Corporations (Taxing) Act 1990	No. 106 of 1990	2 January 1991
An Act to impose certain fees, contributions, and levies referred to in Part 7 of the Corporations (Western Australia) Act 1990 (Note: Corporations (Western Australia) Act 1990 (No. 105)) to the extent that any such fee, contribution, or levy may be a tax.

== Sources ==
- "legislation.wa.gov.au".
