= Minor (law) =

Person below a certain age prescribed by law

In law, a minor is someone under a certain age, usually the age of majority, which demarcates an underage individual from legal adulthood. The age of majority depends upon jurisdiction and application, but it is commonly between 18 and 21. Minor may also be used in contexts that are unconnected to the overall age of majority. For example, the smoking and drinking age in the United States is 21, and younger people below this age are sometimes called minors in the context of tobacco and alcohol law, even if they are at least 18. The terms underage or minor often refer to those under the age of majority, but may also refer to a person under other legal age limits, such as the age of consent, marriageable age, driving age, voting age, working age, etc. Such age limits are often different from the age of majority.

The concept of minor is not sharply defined in most jurisdictions. The age of criminal responsibility, of ability to legally consent to sexual activity, at which school attendance is no longer compulsory and thus a person may leave school, at which legally-binding contracts may be entered into, and so on and so forth, may be different from one another. Parental responsibility for juvenile delinquency varies by country and can include vicarious liability and status offenses.

In many countries, the age of majority is 18. In the United States, where the age of majority is set by individual states, minor usually refers to someone under 18 but can in some areas (such as alcohol, gambling, and handguns) mean under 21. In the criminal justice system a minor may be tried and punished either as a juvenile or as an adult.

In Thailand, a minor is a person under 20 years of age, and, in South Korea, a person under 19 years of age. In New Zealand, the age of majority is also 20 years of age, but most of the rights of adulthood are assumed at lower ages.

== By country ==
=== Canada ===
For all provincial laws, the provincial and territorial governments have the power to set the age of majority in their respective province or territory, and the age varies across Canada, with some provinces setting the (baseline) age of majority at 18 and others at 19. In some territories a person can emancipate, and assume full responsibility from the age of 16.

In Alberta, Manitoba, Ontario, Quebec, Saskatchewan, and Prince Edward Island the (baseline) age of majority is set at 18, while in British Columbia, Yukon, the Northwest Territories, Nunavut, Newfoundland, Nova Scotia, and New Brunswick the age of majority is 19.

In the provinces of Saskatchewan, Ontario, New Brunswick, British Columbia, Nova Scotia, the legal gambling age and the legal drinking age are both 19, while in Alberta, Quebec, and Manitoba it is 18 which is the age of majority.

Under cannabis laws, a minor means anyone under 19 in the country except for Quebec which has a legal age of 21, and Alberta which is age 18.

=== Italy ===
In Italy, law nr. 39 of March 8, 1975, states that a minor is a person under the age of 18. Citizens under the age of 18 may not vote, be elected, obtain a driving license for automobiles or issue or sign legal instruments. Crimes committed in Italy by minors are tried in a juvenile court.

=== Mexico ===
In all 31 states, a minor is referred to as someone under the age of 18.

Minors aged 16 or 17 who are charged with crimes could sometimes be treated as an adult.

=== India ===
In all 28 states and 8 union territories, a minor is referred to as someone under the age of 18. In rare cases minors aged 16 or 17 who are charged with extremely heinous crimes could sometimes be treated as an adult.

=== Thailand ===
The Civil and Commercial Code of the Kingdom of Thailand does not define minor; however, sections 19 and 20 read as follows:

- Section 19 – A person, on completion of 20 years of age, ceases to be a minor and becomes sui juris.
- Section 20 – A minor becomes sui juris upon marriage, provided the marriage is made in accordance with the provisions of Section 1448.

Hence, a minor in Thailand refers to any person under the age of 20, unless they are married. A minor is restricted from doing juristic acts – for example, signing contracts. When minors wish to do a juristic act, they have to obtain the consent from their legal representative, usually (but not always) the parents and otherwise the act is voidable. The exceptions are acts by which a minor merely acquires a right or is freed from a duty, acts that are strictly personal, and acts that are suitable to the person's condition in life and are required for their reasonable needs. A minor can make a will at the age of fifteen.

=== South Korea ===
In South Korea's civil code, anyone over 19 years old (international age) is considered an adult, and an 18-year-old is legally considered a minor.

However, even if a person is 18 years old, on reaching 1 January of the year they turn 19, they are allowed to drink, smoke, and access adult content.

According to the Act on the Protection of Children and Youth Against Sex Offenses (아동·청소년의 성보호에 관한 법률), the definition of a child is under 19 (international age, not so-called Korean age) years of age. Therefore, the legal definition of child sexual abuse material (also known as child pornography) in South Korea is "anything featuring persons under the age of 19". Therefore, pornography featuring an 18-year-old person (including high school graduates) is classified as child pornography in South Korea, even making possession and viewing illegal, unlike other countries. In countries where 18 is not the age of majority, except for South Korea, the definition of child pornography is "anything that features a person under the age of 18". (example: United Arab Emirates)

=== United Kingdom ===
In England and Wales, the Family Law Reform Act 1969 set the age of majority in both nations at 18. While in Northern Ireland, the age of majority is set at 18 by the Age of Majority Act (Northern Ireland) 1969 - (which directly corresponds to the former legislation, enacted in England and Wales). In Scotland, the Age of Legal Capacity (Scotland) Act 1991 sets out that the legal age of capacity within the country is 16.

The (minimum) age of criminal responsibility in England and Wales, and Northern Ireland is 10. Sentencing guidelines in these three jurisdictions is often tiered, so that a person who is over the age of criminal responsibility (but not of full age), will receive more lenient treatment depending on how old said person is (so for example, punishment will differ between an offender who is under 12, under 14, or under 16, at the time of a given offence, for example, with harsher punishments being received the higher the age of the offender in question).

In Scotland, the (minimum) age of criminal responsibility is 12.

Things that persons under 18 are prohibited from doing include sitting on a jury, standing as a candidate, buying or renting films with an 18 or R18 classification or seeing them in a cinema, suing without a litigant friend, and purchasing alcohol, or tobacco products.

Driving certain large vehicles, acting as personal license holder for licensed premises, and adopting a child are permitted only upon the age of 21. The minimum age to drive a HGV1 vehicle was reduced to 18. However, certain vehicles, e.g., steamrollers, require that someone be 21 years of age to obtain an operating license.

=== United States ===
In the United States as of 1971, minor is generally legally defined as a person under the age of 18. The twenty-sixth amendment to the U.S. Constitution, ratified in 1971, granted all citizens the right to vote in every state, in every election, from the age of 18, reducing the minimum ages for most privileges that had previously been set at 21 (signing contracts, marrying without parental consent, termination of legal parental custody) to 18.

Under this distinction, those considered juveniles are usually (but not always) tried in juvenile court, and they may be afforded other special protections. For example, in some states a parent or guardian must be present during police questioning, or their names may be kept confidential when they are accused of a crime. For many crimes (especially more violent crimes), the age at which a minor may be tried as an adult is variable below the age of 18 or (less often) below 16. The death penalty in the United States for those who have committed a crime while under the age of 18 was discontinued by the U.S. Supreme Court case Roper v. Simmons in 2005. The court's 5–4 decision was written by Justice Kennedy and joined by Justices Ginsburg, Stevens, Breyer, and Souter, and cited international law, child developmental science, and many other factors in reaching its conclusion.

However, not all minors are considered juveniles in terms of criminal responsibility. As is frequently the case in the United States, the laws vary widely by state. Some states, including Florida, have passed laws that allow a person accused of certain crimes, such as murder, to be tried as an adult, regardless of age. These laws have been challenged by the American Civil Liberties Union. An estimated 250,000 youth are tried, sentenced, or incarcerated as adults every year across the United States.

==== Medical ====
Whether an adolescent is able to provide consent for medical care and services depends upon whether they are considered emancipated minor, medically emancipated, or mature minors. This also varies from state to state.

Marriage, military service, or living separately from parents and managing one's own financial affairs usually mean emancipation.

==== Drinking and gambling ====
The legal drinking age was raised to 21 around the 1980s due to teen drunk driving cases protested by the Mothers Against Drunk Driving. The gambling age varies by state. So, in the context of alcohol or gambling, people under the age of 21 may also sometimes be referred to as minors.

==== Enemy combatants ====
The U.S. Department of Defense took the position that they would not consider "enemy combatants" held in extrajudicial detention in the Guantanamo Bay detainment camps minors unless they were less than sixteen years old. In any event, they separated only three of more than a dozen detainees under 16 from the adult prison population. Several dozen detainees between sixteen and eighteen were detained with the adult prison population. Now those under 18 are kept separate, in line with the age of majority and world expectations.

== Emancipation of minors ==
Emancipation of minors is a legal mechanism by which a minor is no longer under the control of their parents or guardians, and is given the legal rights associated with adults. Depending on country, emancipation may happen in different manners: through marriage, attaining economic self-sufficiency, obtaining an educational degree or diploma, or participating in a form of military service. In the United States, all states have some form of emancipation of minors.

== See also ==
- Age of consent
