= Oz Lotto =

Lottery brand owned by Tatts Group and operated under the brand 'the Lott'

Oz Lotto is an Australian national lottery. It was launched in 1994 as "Australia's first-ever nationwide lottery game".

== Operation ==
It is owned and operated by each Australian state and territory lottery licensee. This includes those licensees under The Lottery Corporation’s The Lott brand, such as New South Wales Lotteries in New South Wales and the Australian Capital Territory, Tattersalls in Victoria, Tasmania and the Northern Territory, Golden Casket in Queensland and South Australian Lotteries in South Australia. The government-owned Lotterywest owns and operates the lottery game in Western Australia.

== Rules ==
Oz Lotto was first introduced in 1994 and promoted as Australia's first fully national lottery game, at a time when New South Wales was not part of The Australian Lottery Bloc.

Originally, the game was similar to Saturday Lotto, requiring six numbers to be picked out of 45. However, starting 18 October 2005, a seventh number began to be drawn, greatly lengthening the odds of winning Division 1.

To emphasise the addition of the seventh Oz Lotto ball, branding for the game changed in some states, including to Super 7’s Oz Lotto in Tatts jurisdictions and Oz 7 Lotto in Queensland. As of 2012, the game reverted to its nation-wide Oz Lotto brand.

Oz Lotto reached its highest jackpot in 2012. Originally guaranteed at $100 million, four winners shared a Division 1 pool of $111,972,151.04 in the draw on 6 November 2012.

On 17 May 2022, Oz Lotto had its second major change to the game in its history, with the aim of delivering bigger prizes and more winners. The Oz Lotto matrix changed from seven winning numbers drawn from 45 to seven winning numbers drawn from 47. An additional supplementary number was also introduced, increasing the supplementary numbers drawn from two to three. The game change also saw the jackpot base increase from $2 million to $3 million.

On 4 February 2026, Oz Lotto increased the base jackpot from $3 Million to $4 Million. The slogan ‘Kinda Life Changing’ also debuted that day, ditching all the animated lotto balls, including Oz The Oz Lotto Ball.

== Prizes ==
Although the draw now requires seven numbers to be selected, the minimum prize level (of 3 winning numbers and one of the supplementary numbers) was unchanged.

Oz Lotto guarantees a minimum division one prize pool of $3 million.

From time to time, Oz Lotto offers special ‘Prize Boost’ events, which increases the prize amounts that could be won in Divisions 2 to 7.

The Oz Lotto draw takes place every Tuesday at approximately 8.30pm AEDT.

Division	Winning Numbers Required	Probability (Single Game)
1st Division	7	1 in 62,891,499
2nd Division	6 + 1 supplementary	1 in 2,994,834
3rd Division	6	1 in 242,825
4th Division	5 + 1 supplementary	1 in 26,271
5th Division	5	1 in 4,497
6th Division	4	1 in 182
7th Division	3 + 1 supplementary	1 in 71
Any Prize		1 in 51

== See also ==
- Lotteries in Australia
