= Lucy Kiraly =

Australian model and television presenter

Lucy Kiraly (born 1950) is an Australian fashion model and television presenter.

She was, with David Johnston, the presenter of the first TattsLotto draw conducted by Melbourne television station HSV7 on 22 June 1972. Born in Romania, she came to Melbourne with her family in 1965, and was educated at Elwood College and Monash University. Kiraly was Model of the Year in 1969 and represented Australia at Expo 1970 in Osaka, Japan.

Kiraly is director of The Fashion Team, a company producing fashion shows in Victoria. She owns Giant Management, a Melbourne modelling agency.
