= Tabcorp =

Australian gambling entertainment company

Tabcorp Holdings Limited
- Type: Public
- Traded as: ASX: TAH
- Industry: Gambling
- Founded: 1994
- Headquarters: Melbourne, Australia
- Key people: Gillon McLachlan (CEO)
- Products: Gambling; Gaming; Media
- Revenue: ▲AUD$2.6 billion (2025); ▼AUD$2.34 billion (2024)
- Number of employees: 5,000+ (2019)
- Website: www.tabcorp.com.au

Tabcorp is Australia's largest gambling company, employing more than 5,000 people. It is the largest provider of wagering and gaming products and services in Australia. Tabcorp is listed on the Australian Securities Exchange (ASX).

== History ==
In 2017, Tatts Group combined with Tabcorp Holdings Limited to create a diversified entertainment group under the Tabcorp brand. The following year UBET was transitioned back into the flagship TAB brand. In July 2021, Tabcorp announced it would spin off its lotteries and keno business into a separate listed company, called The Lottery Corporation with Tabcorp retaining its wagering and media arm.

=== Tabcorp history ===
In 1961, the Victorian TAB (Totalisator Agency Board) was established, legalising off-course totalisator betting. Three years later in 1964, the NSW TAB was established, betting on two race meetings on its first day at Canterbury and Menangle.

Tabcorp was listed on the Australian Securities Exchange by the Government of Victoria in August 1994, operating a wagering and gaming licence in Victoria. In 1999, Tabcorp announced the acquisition of Star City Holdings and in 2000 it acquired Structured Data Systems which developed wagering and Keno systems and animated games.

Tabcorp merged with Jupiters in November 2003 and in 2004, took over Tab Limited, the New South Wales based wagering and media company, including Sky Channel.

Matthew Slatter became CEO of Tabcorp in 2002, and oversaw the merge with Jupiters in 2003. However, after a 10% fall in profits in early 2007, he was sacked by the Tabcorp board.

In 2011, Tabcorp demerged its casino operations resulting in Tabcorp's casinos business being separately listed as Echo Entertainment Group. The existing wagering, media, gaming and Keno businesses were retained by Tabcorp.

In 2012, Tabcorp commenced operating Victoria's new Wagering and Betting Licence. In 2014 Tabcorp acquired ACT TAB. In 2016, Tabcorp acquired the gaming systems company Intecq.

In May 2022, Tabcorp shareholders approved the scheme of arrangement for the demerger of the Lotteries and Keno business The Lottery Corporation from Tabcorp. The Lottery Corporation commenced trading on the ASX on 24 May 2022. The Lottery Corporation operate the brands The Lott and Keno.

In June 2024, former Australian Football League CEO Gillon McLachlan was appointed CEO of Tabcorp, beginning the role in August 2024.

==== Controversies ====
On 16 March 2017, Tabcorp was fined A$45 million for breaching money laundering laws. Suspicious behaviour on 108 occasions was not reported to the Australian Transaction Reports and Analysis Centre (AUSTRAC).

On 22 August 2007, an investigation by News.com.au reporters Will Temple and David Higgins revealed claims that Tabcorp had secret approval from the NSW government to loan money to "select high value wagering customers".

In April 2018, the UK Gambling Commission fined Tabcorp £84,000 after its subsidiary business Sun Bets, was found to have breached gambling laws for a publicity stunt involving taking bets on Sutton United's reserve goalkeeper eating a pie during an FA Cup tie against Arsenal F.C. in February 2017.

In May 2026, AUSTRAC launched an investigation into Tabcorp over concerns about the company's ability to prevent illegal activity, such as money laundering and terrorism financing, on its platform.

=== Tatts Group history ===
TAB Qld (TABQ) opened for business in 1962 and was listed by the Government of Queensland on the ASX in November 1999. In 2000, TABQ acquired the Northern Territory TAB from the Government of the Northern Territory and in 2002, the South Australian TAB from the Government of South Australia. In December 2002, TABQ changed its name to UNiTAB.

In 2004, UNiTAB acquired Maxgaming NSW and in 2005 Tattersalls Ltd listed on the ASX and acquired Bytecraft. Tattersalls Ltd and UNiTAB conducted a merger of equals in 2006 under the Tattersalls brand. In 2007, Tattersalls acquired Talarius and Golden Casket and changed its name to Tatts Group.

In 2010, Tatts Group acquired NSW Lotteries. In 2012, Tatts Group acquired SA Lotteries and Tote Tasmania. In 2014, Tatts Group secured a Queensland wagering deal with 30 years exclusivity, and in the same year Victorian Instant Scratch-Its returned to Tatts Group. In 2015, Tatts Group launched Set For Life and UBET. In 2016, Tatts Group launched the Lott and MAX as well as securing a 15-year monitoring licence. In the same year, Tatts Group sold Talarius to Novomatic.

=== Wagering and media ===
Tabcorp was the market leader in Australian wagering, operating under the TAB brand until the 2020 combination of Flutter's SportingBet with BetEasy.

TAB operates in 4,400+ venues across Australia and in FY18 delivered $1 billion in returns to industry partners. TAB takes 1.1 billion bets annually and has 57% revenue market share.

== See also ==
- Lotteries in Australia
- Gambling in Australia
