= Golden Casket =

Lottery brand in Queensland

- Industry: Lotteries
- Founded: 1917
- Headquarters: Brisbane, Australia
- Area served: Queensland
- Products: Oz Lotto, Powerball, Gold Lotto, Weekday Windfall, Superdraw and Megadraw, Set For Life, Super '66', The Pools, Lucky Lotteries, Instant Scratch-Its
- Brands: The Lott
- Parent: The Lottery Corporation
- Website: thelott.com

Golden Casket is the lottery corporation in Queensland. It sells lottery tickets and Instant Scratch-Its (scratchcards) through newsagents and other convenience stores. Lottery draws are televised on Channel Seven six nights a week.

The drawing of the first Golden Casket in 1917 by Queensland Patriotic Fund was to raise money to support veterans of World War I with a first prize of £5,000 (around $500,000 in 2019 currency). The operation was taken over by the Queensland Government in 1920. In 1938, the Casket paid for the construction of the new Royal Brisbane Women's Hospital. The Council of Churches, representing the evangelical churches of Queensland, was firmly opposed to government support for gambling, arguing that it legitimized an immoral industry.

In April 2007 the Queensland Government sold the Golden Casket operation to gambling company Tattersall's Limited for $530 million, with the proceeds going to the Royal Children's Hospital and the state government retaining ownership of the Golden Casket trademark via the Queensland Lottery Corporation.

On 1 June 2016 the Golden Casket brand became one of the four Tatts Group. It now sits under the brand 'The Lott' (which also includes Tatts, NSW Lotteries and SA Lotteries) is owned by The Lottery Corporation.

== Lottery Games ==
Golden Casket's lottery games include Oz Lotto, Powerball, Saturday Gold Lotto, Weekday Windfall, Set For Life, Super '66', Lucky Lotteries Super Jackpot and Lucky Lotteries Mega Jackpot and Instant Scratch-Its.

== In popular culture ==
Winning the Golden Casket is a major event in Neville Shute's novel A Town Like Alice.

== See also ==
- Lotteries in Australia
