= Gambling age =

Legal criterion for gambling

The gambling age is an aspect of gambling law — the minimum age at which one can legally gamble in a certain jurisdiction. In some countries, gambling is illegal regardless of age, while some countries have different age limits for different types of gambling, and some countries have no explicit minimum gambling age.

== Oceania ==
Country	Age	Notes
American Samoa	Illegal for all ages 18 (bingo and raffles)	Gambling is illegal except for bingo and community raffles.
Australia	18	The Interactive Gambling Act 2001 passed by the Commonwealth Parliament of Australia banned online gambling in the form of casinos and slots.
Federated States of Micronesia	Dependent on State law	(Chuuk State) Chuuk and (Yap State) Yap – illegal
Fiji	18	
French Polynesia	18	
Kiribati	18	
Marshall Islands	Illegal for all ages	Gambling is illegal except for non-profit bingo, raffles and cakewalks.
Nauru	18	
New Zealand	20 (casinos) 18 (horse racing and instant kiwi); None (other types, including lottery)	
Palau	18	Gambling is illegal in Palau except for social gambling, non-profit organisations, and offshore gambling. The social gambling age is tied to the age of majority, which is 18 under Palauan law.
Papua New Guinea	18	
Samoa	21	Land-based casinos authorized to operate in Samoa are intended exclusively for foreign tourists.
Solomon Islands	18	People below the age of 18 can gamble with parental permission in a private dwelling-house or in the presence of a parent. For certain small lotteries, the minimum age to purchase a ticket is 16.
Tokelau	Illegal for all ages	Gaming is illegal in Tokelau (defined as "a game for money with cards or with dice").
Tonga	Illegal for all ages	All casinos and lotteries are prohibited.
Tuvalu	18	People below the age of 18 can gamble with parental permission in a private dwelling-house or in the presence of a parent. For certain small lotteries, one only needs to be 16 in order to buy a ticket.
Vanuatu	18	The given references only prevent people under the age of 18 from gambling online or in casinos.

== Europe ==
Country/territory	Minimum age	Notes
Albania	21	
Andorra	18	
Austria	18	
Belarus	18	
Belgium	21 (casinos); 18 (national lottery)	
Bosnia and Herzegovina	18	
Bulgaria	18	
Croatia	18 (excluding non-casino machines and private)	
Cyprus	18	
Czech Republic	18	
Denmark	18 (except sports betting)	
Estonia	21 (casinos); 18 (sports betting, national lottery)	
Faroe Islands	18	
Finland	18	
France	18	Lowered from 21 to 18 on May 5, 1987, for casinos.
Germany	18–21	Varies by state and type of gambling; lotteries and casinos are generally rated above 18, except for casinos in Baden-Württemberg, Bavaria and Lower Saxony, which are rated above 21.
Gibraltar	18	
Greece	21 (casinos, online betting, VLT) 18 (offline betting at OPAP betting shops and authorized resellers)	
Georgia	25, or 18 for foreign citizens and stateless persons	
Guernsey	18	
Hungary	18	
Iceland	18	
(Republic of Ireland) Ireland	18	
Isle of Man	18	
Italy	18	
Kosovo	Illegal for all ages	Gambling was outlawed in 2019 for 10 years due to a string of murders that occurred in casinos that year.
Latvia	18	
Liechtenstein	18	
Lithuania	18	
Luxembourg	18	
Malta	18, or 25 for Maltese citizens	
Moldova	18	
Monaco	18	
Montenegro	18	
Netherlands	18	
Northern Cyprus	18	
North Macedonia	18	
Norway	18	
Poland	18	
Portugal	25 (some casinos); 18 (some casinos, and all other types)	Portugal has complicated gambling laws. It depends on each casino, and there are even some casinos which allow tourists from the age of 18, and local people from 25.
Romania	18	On 16 February 2026, the senate passed a bill to raise the age limit to 21.
San Marino	18	
Serbia	18	
Slovakia	18	
Slovenia	18	
Spain	18	
Sweden	20 (casinos) 18 (other types)	
Switzerland	18	
Turkey	Illegal for all ages (casinos); 18 (lotteries)	Gambling is illegal in Turkey except for lotteries and horse races.
Ukraine	21	
UK (United Kingdom)	Age variable by bet: 18; 16; None (See the table for more information)	Gambling ages in the United Kingdom are set out in the Gambling Act 2005: Part 4, Protection of children and young persons.: Type of gambling / Minimum age / Relevant sections of the Act; Gambling in casinos or other licensed gambling premises It is illegal to permit any person under the age of 18 to enter a licensed gambling premises. The only exception is licensed family entertainment centres. / 18 / 46, 47, 48 and 49; Gaming machine (Machine category: A, B1, B2, B3, B3A, B4, C) / 18 / 47 and 48; Gaming machine (Machine category: D) / None / 46 (2)(e) and 48 (2)(e); Lotteries / 16 / 48 (2)(c); Football pool / 16 / 48 (2)(d); Private or non-commercial gaming and betting / None / 48 (2)(a)&(b); Equal chance gaming in accordance with a prize gaming permit, or Equal chance gaming at a licensed family entertainment centre / None / 48 (2)(f)&(g); Prize gaming at a non-licensed family entertainment centre, or Prize gaming at a travelling fair / None / 48 (2)(h)&(i)
Vatican City	Illegal for all ages (casinos) None (lottery)	Gambling is illegal in Vatican City, except for the Government lottery.

== Asia ==
Country/territory	Minimum age	Notes
Akrotiri and Dhekelia	18	
Afghanistan	Illegal for all ages	All casinos and lotteries are forbidden.
Armenia	21	
Azerbaijan	18	
Bahrain	Illegal for all ages None (raffles)	
Bangladesh	Illegal for all ages	
Bhutan	Illegal for all ages 18 (lottery)	Gambling is illegal in Bhutan except for the Government lottery.
British Indian Ocean Territory	18	
Brunei Darussalam	Illegal for all ages	
Cambodia	Illegal for all ages (casinos) 18 (lottery)	
China	Illegal for all ages 18 (lotteries)	Gambling is illegal in China except for lotteries. Macau and Hong Kong are exceptions to these laws and have their own legal frameworks allowing casinos and other forms of betting.
Christmas Island	18	
Cocos (Keeling) Islands	18	
Hong Kong	18	Gambling is illegal in China except for lotteries. Hong Kong is an exception to these laws and has its own legal frameworks allowing casinos and other forms of betting.
India	21	According to Public Gambling Act 1867, gambling is considered as illegal in the majority of the regions across the country. Further information: Gambling in India
Indonesia	Illegal for all ages	All forms of gambling are illegal.
Iran	Illegal for all ages	
Iraq	Illegal for all ages 18 (lottery)	Gambling is illegal in Iraq, except for the Government lottery.
Israel	18	
Japan	20; 18 (pachinko)	Majority is lowered to 18, but gambling age still stays at 20 (for lotteries and casinos).
Jordan	Illegal for all ages 18 (lottery)	Gambling is illegal in Jordan, except for the Government lottery.
Kazakhstan	21	
Kuwait	Illegal for all ages	Gambling is outlawed in Kuwait under influence of Sharia.
Kyrgyzstan	18	
Laos	18	
Lebanon	21	
Macau	21; 18 (lottery, sports betting, racing)	Gambling is illegal in China except for lotteries. Macau is an exception to these laws and has its own legal frameworks allowing casinos and other forms of betting.
Malaysia	21; Illegal for all ages (Muslims)	Resorts World Genting in Genting Highlands is the only casino in Malaysia as of 2025.
Maldives	Illegal for all ages	
Mongolia	Illegal for all ages	The Mongolian parliament outlawed gambling in mid-2025.
Myanmar	18	
Nepal	21 (casinos) 18 (lotteries)	Casinos in Nepal are limited to tourists and foreigners. Nepalese citizens are prohibited from entering casinos.
North Korea	Illegal for all ages	Casinos in North Korea are intended for foreign visitors. There is no publicly available, authoritative source that specifies a minimum legal age for lotteries.
Oman	Illegal for all ages	
Pakistan	Illegal for all ages	
Palestine	Illegal for all ages	
Philippines	21 (casinos); 18 (lottery)	
Qatar	Illegal for all ages	
Russia	18	
Saudi Arabia	Illegal for all ages	
Singapore	21 (casinos); 18 (lottery, sports betting, racing)	
South Korea	19	
Sri Lanka	21	
Syria	Illegal for all ages	
Taiwan	20	
Tajikistan	18	
Thailand	Illegal for all ages (casinos) 20 (lottery)	Gambling is illegal in Thailand, except for the Government lottery.
Timor-Leste	18	Only the Government lottery and licensed slot machines are legal.
Turkey	Illegal for all ages (casinos); 18 (lotteries)	Gambling is illegal in Turkey except for lotteries and horse races.
UAE	21 (casinos) 18 (lotteries)	
Uzbekistan	Illegal for all ages 18 (lotteries)	Gambling was outlawed in 2007, except for lotteries. The Uzbek government went to sign decrees legalizing and regulating online sports betting to fund the development of local football. However, due to internal debates and social concerns, this move was revoked or put on hold, leaving online betting prohibited.
Vietnam	21	
Yemen	Illegal for all ages	

== Africa ==
Country/territory	Minimum age	Notes
Algeria	Illegal for all ages	
Angola	18	
Benin	18	
Botswana	18	
Burkina Faso	18	
Burundi	18	
Cameroon	21	
Cape Verde	18	
Central African Republic	18	
Chad	18	This law is often not enforced virtually.
Comoros	18	
Cote d'Ivoire	18	
Democratic Republic of the Congo	18	
(Republic of the Congo) Republic of Congo	18	
Djibouti	18	
Egypt	21	
Equatorial Guinea	18	
Eritrea	Illegal for all ages	This framework heavily incorporates Islamic Sharia principles.
Eswatini	21 (casinos) 18 (lottery)	
Ethiopia	21	
Gabon	18	As of 2026
The Gambia	18	
Ghana	18	
Guinea	18	
Guinea Bissau	18	As of 2026
Kenya	21	
Lesotho	18	
Liberia	18	
Libya	Illegal for all ages	Under Islamic law (Sharia), gambling is illegal.
Madagascar	18	
Malawi	18	
Mali	18	
Mauritania	Illegal for all ages	
Mauritius	21	Mauritian law blocks access to international betting websites that not are not licensed in Mauritian territory.
Morocco	18	
Mozambique	18	
Namibia	21	
Niger	21 (some casinos) 18 (some other casinos, all other types)	
Nigeria	18	
Rwanda	18	
São Tomé and Príncipe	18	
Senegal	18	
Seychelles	18	
Sierra Leone	18	
Somalia	Illegal for all ages	
South Africa	18	
South Sudan	18	
Sudan	Illegal for all ages	
Tanzania	18	
Togo	18	
Tunisia	18	Casinos are intended for foreign tourists only
Uganda	25	
Zambia	18	
Zimbabwe	18	

== North America ==
Country/territory	Minimum age	Notes
Anguilla	21 (commercial gaming) 16 (minor local and charitable lotteries)	
Antigua and Barbuda	18	
Bahamas	18	
Barbados	18	
Belize	18	
British Virgin Islands	18	
Canada	18–19 (varies by province)	Province / Minimum age / Notes; Alberta / 18 (casinos); 18 (lottery); British Columbia / 19 (casinos); 19 (lottery); Manitoba / 18 (casinos); 18 (lottery); New Brunswick / 19 (casinos); 19 (lottery); Newfoundland and Labrador / 19 (casinos); 19 (lottery); Nova Scotia / 19 (casinos); 19 (lottery); Ontario / 19 (casinos); 18 (lottery); Prince Edward Island / 19 (casinos); 19 (lottery); Quebec / 18 (casinos); 18 (lottery); Saskatchewan / 19 (casinos); 18 (lottery)
Cayman Islands	18	
Costa Rica	18	
Cuba	Illegal for all ages	
Dominica	18	
Dominican Republic	18	
El Salvador	18	
Greenland	18	
Grenada	18	
Guatemala	18	
Haiti	18	
Honduras	18	
Jamaica	18	
Mexico	18	
Nicaragua	18	
Panama	18	
Puerto Rico	18	
Saint Kitts and Nevis	18	
Saint Vincent and the Grenadines	18	
Saint Lucia	18	
Turks and Caicos Islands	21	
US Virgin Islands	21 (casinos); 18 (other)	
United States	18, 19, 21 or illegal (varies by state)	State / Minimum age / Notes; Alabama / 19; Alaska / 21; Arizona / 21; Arkansas / 21; California / 21 or 18 (casinos) 18 (Lottery); Colorado / 21 (casinos) 18 (lottery); Connecticut / 21; Delaware / 21 (casinos) 18 (lottery); District of Columbia / 18; Florida / 21 (casinos) 18 (lottery); Georgia / 18; Hawaii / Illegal for all ages; Idaho / 18; Illinois / 21; Indiana / 21; Iowa / 21; Kansas / 21; Kentucky / 18; Louisiana / 21; Maine / 21 (casinos) 18 (lottery); Maryland / 21; Massachusetts / 21 (casinos) 18 (lottery); Michigan / 18; Minnesota / 18; Mississippi / 21; Missouri / 21; Montana / 18; Nebraska / 21; Nevada / 21; New Hampshire / 21; New Jersey / 21; New Mexico / 21; New York / 18; North Carolina / 21; North Dakota / 19; Ohio / 21 or 18; Oklahoma / 18; Oregon / 21 (casinos) 18 (other); Pennsylvania / 21; Rhode Island / 18; South Dakota / 21; South Carolina / 21; Tennessee / 21 (sports betting) 18 (lottery); Texas / 21; Utah / Illegal for all ages; Vermont / 21; Virginia / 21 (casinos) 18 (other); Washington / 18; West Virginia / 21; Wisconsin / 21; Wyoming / 21

== South America ==
Country/territory	Minimum age	Notes
Argentina	18	
Aruba	18	This law is not often enforced.
Bolivia	18	
Brazil	Illegal for all ages (casinos and bets); 18 (lotteries, VLT)	Gambling is illegal in Brazil except for lotteries. In September 2026, President Luiz Inácio Lula da Silva decided to completely ban online betting sites and digital casinos in Brazil. The measure will be announced in the coming days via a provisional measure.
Chile	18	
Colombia	18	
Curacao	18	
Ecuador	18	
Falkland Islands	18	
French Guiana	18	
Guyana	18	
Paraguay	18	
Peru	18	
Suriname	18	
Trinidad and Tobago	18	
Uruguay	18	
Venezuela	18	

== Antarctica ==
Country/territory	Minimum age	Notes
Antarctica	Not applicable / Varying	See Crime in Antarctica
French Southern and Antarctic Lands	18	
Heard and McDonald Islands	18	
South Georgia and the South Sandwich Islands	18	
