= Lotterywest =

Western Australian lottery operator

Agency overview
- Formed: 1932
- Jurisdiction: Government of Western Australia
- Headquarters: Subiaco
- Annual budget: $1.2 billion (2023)
- Agency executives: Colin Smith, Chief Executive Officer; Karen Brown, Chair
- Website: www.lotterywest.wa.gov.au

Lotterywest was established in 1932 as the Lotteries Commission of Western Australia, to run the lottery in Western Australia. It is referred to in the legislation as the Lotteries Commission. It distributes profits to a number of community beneficiaries, via both government departments and directly to not-for-profit organisations. It is a major supporter of the Perth Festival, with the film festival component of it known as Lotterywest Films.

== History ==
After its establishment in 1932, the Lotteries Commission held its first lottery and made its first grants distribution in March 1933. The commission was established by the government of James Mitchell as a way to raise additional funds during the Great Depression.

== Description ==
Lotterywest is a statutory authority of the Government of Western Australia, under the Lotteries Commission Act 1990 (WA) and associated regulations.

Lotterywest sells lottery tickets and "instant win" Scratch 'n’ Win tickets through a network of newsagents and other authorised retailers. It sells national lottery games including Saturday Lotto, Super66, Oz Lotto, Powerball, Monday and Wednesday lotto; it also administers the locally run Cash 3 game.

== Beneficiaries ==
After some of the money wagered on Lotterywest's games is returned to players as prize money, and operating costs and retailer commission are covered, the balance of the money is returned to the Western Australian community.

The state's hospitals and health services, the Department of Sport & Recreation and the Department of Culture & the Arts, and specifically the Perth Festival, are beneficiaries of Lotterywest funding as prescribed in the Lotteries Commission Act 1990. As well as these beneficiaries, Lotterywest makes grants directly available to not-for-profit community groups and local government authorities for charitable and benevolent purposes. Lotterywest directly supports the Perth Festival, with the associated with the festival known as Lotterywest Films, as well as local screen funding body Screenwest.

Lotterywest provides funding following a formula prescribed in the Lotteries Commission Act 1990. Of profits made (as of 2013), it specifies that 40% of should go to the Department of Health, 5% to the Sports Lottery Account and another 5% to the Arts Lottery Account. The ministers responsible for each portfolio distributes the funds to various organisations. A further 12.5% is allocated to direct distribution by Lotterywest to eligible charitable and community organisations and local government authorities for charitable or benevolent purposes. An additional amount up to 5% is specified in the act for the Perth Festival, awarded to the University of Western Australia, which runs the Festival, and for the support of the Western Australian film industry, which is given to Screenwest.

== See also ==
- Lotteries in Australia
