= Interactive Gambling Act 2001 =

Act of the Parliament of Australia

Parliament of Australia
- Long title: An Act about interactive gambling, and for related purposes
- Citation: No. 84, 2001 as amended
- Territorial extent: States and territories of Australia
- Royal assent: 11 July 2001

Legislative history
- Introduced by: Senator Ian Campbell
- First reading: 5 April 2001
- Second reading: 28 June 2001
- Third reading: 28 June 2001
- Member(s) in charge: Warren Entsch MP
- First reading: 29 June 2001
- Second reading: 29 June 2001
- Third reading: 29 June 2001
- Status: In force

The Interactive Gambling Act (Cth) (or IGA for short) is an Act of the Parliament of Australia, with the purpose of regulating online gambling. The law makes it an offence for online gambling websites to provide their services to customers within Australia, among other measures designed to protect the public from the detrimental effects of gambling. The Act was passed by the Australian Parliament on 29 June 2001, and has been amended a number of times, most recently in 2023.

== Act ==
The Interactive Gambling Act was passed by the Parliament of Australia on 28 June 2001. It received assent on 11 July 2001.

The IGA is targeted at online gambling operators and makes it an offence for them to offer 'real-money' online interactive gambling to residents of Australia. It also makes it illegal for online gambling operators to advertise 'real-money' interactive gambling services (such as online poker and casino) to Australian citizens.

Accessing and using the interactive gambling services is not an offence. It is also allowed to companies based in Australia to offer their gambling services to gamblers located outside Australia with the exception of those countries that were called 'designated countries'. A country can be called designated upon request of the government of this country and on condition that there is corresponding legislation in this country.

Offense

- The law applies to all interactive gambling operators whether they are Australian or foreign owned or whether they are based in Australia or offshore.
- The offence of offering Interactive Gambling Services to Australian residents carries a maximum fine of $220,000 per day for individuals within an Interactive Gambling operation or $1.1 million per day for the actual company.
- The responsibility of upholding the IGA is the responsibility of individual gambling operators. The average Australian citizen cannot be punished for signing up and gambling online.

Reasonable diligence

An offence will not be deemed to have been committed if the online gambling operator could not, with due diligence, have known that they were offering their services to residents of Australia. The IGA defines 'reasonable diligence' in the following ways:

- Whether the operator informed potential customers about the law preventing operators offering Interactive Gambling services to Australian residents.
- Whether a customer's contracts with the online gambling operators stated that the customer could not use the service whilst physically present in Australia
- Whether the customers had to provide personal details such as address and whether the customers' details suggested whether they were residents of Australia

Online wagering

There is some leniency in the Interactive Gambling Act that means not all online gambling was prohibited. For example, sports betting through licensed operators is still legal as long as the betting occurs prior to the sporting event starting – this way the individual is not gambling 'interactively'. Online lotteries are also legal according to the Act, as long as they are not the 'instant-win' style scratch cards.

Advertising

The IGA made it an offence to advertise an interactive gambling service or product - the advertising ban extended across all forms of media (from electronic to print).

Complaints

The IGA has a formal complaints process that is managed by the Australian Broadcasting Authority in which people can register any concerns regarding the advertising of Interactive gambling products.

Act review

On 24 August 2011, the Minister for Broadband, Communications and the Digital Economy, Senator Stephen Conroy, released a discussion paper for the review of the Interactive Gambling Act 2001. The main reasons for reviewing the document are:

- the expansion of online gambling market and the possibility of subsequent growth of problem gambling
- the adequacy of the provisions of the Act to the emerging new technologies
- the necessity to develop an approach to minimisation of negative aspects of online gambling
- the necessity to analyse social, financial and jurisdictional aspects of interactive gambling services in regulated environment
- the necessity to analyse the findings of the Joint Select Committee on Gambling Reform inquiry into interactive and online gambling and gambling advertising and the Productivity Commission Inquiry Report on Gambling

The final report has to be presented by the first half of 2012, subject to the Joint Select Committee on Gambling Reform reporting by the end of 2011.
