= Lotteries in Australia =

Lotteries in Australia include various lottery related products licensed by The Lottery Corporation, The Lottery Office and Lotterywest Australian lottery companies. Lotteries operators are licensed at a state or territory level, and include both state government-owned, not-for-profit and private sector companies. Most major Lotteries have now moved into the online marketplace.

== Major lotteries ==
As of February 2015, the major players in the lottery industry include:

- The Lottery Corporation – In 2022, Tabcorp's Lotteries & Keno business demerged to form The Lottery Corporation – the leader in the Australian lotteries and Keno market, and one of the highest performing lottery businesses globally. The Lottery Corporation, an official Government licensed operator in all States of Australia apart from Western Australia. It operates under the "Tatts" brand in Victoria, Tasmania, and the Northern Territory. It also manages Queensland's Golden Casket Lottery Corporation (which it took over from the Queensland government in 2007), New South Wales Lotteries in NSW and the ACT and South Australian Lotteries in South Australia;
- Lotterywest, the Western Australian Government-owned operator in Western Australia;
- The Lottery Office, operating since 2003, is 100% Australian owned and licensed. The Lottery Office operates FutureBall lottery, as well as issuing matched lottery tickets in corresponding overseas lottery draws;
- Intralot Australia, which operates under "Intralot" in Tasmania;
- The publicly listed Jumbo Interactive, an online re-seller of lotteries operating as Ozlotteries; and
- The privately owned company Netlotto, an online re-seller of lotteries via the netlotto.com.au website.

From 2007 to 2014, Intralot Australia held a lottery licence to sell Instant Scratch-its, Keno and bingo tickets in Victoria. The licence was sold to Tatts Group in October 2014.

State government-owned corporations were once a major sector in the industry. However, with The Lott, part of The Lottery Corporation, taking over operation of all state-owned lotteries apart from Western Australia (though the states still retain legal ownership), the only remaining state owned-and-operated lottery in Australia is Lotterywest in Western Australia.

Although the organisations are predominantly state-based, Australia has a number of national lottery games. Currently, The Lott and Lotterywest operate as a bloc to jointly conduct the national games, pooling their entries and winnings. For example, The Lott administers the Saturday Lotto (also known as TattsLotto, Gold Lotto and X Lotto in some jurisdictions), Oz Lotto and Powerball games on behalf of the bloc; similarly, South Australian Lotteries operated the Australian Soccer Pools on behalf of the other operators. The major operators also market lottery games traditionally running in their own jurisdiction, however recently some of these have become "multi-state" games, if not national.

On 1 June 2016, Tattersall's created a national lottery brand called 'The Lott'. The brand encompasses all its jurisdictional lottery brands under this single entity. Corresponding with the change in branding, online lottery purchases were moved from Tatts.com to the new official lotteries website.

Australian lotteries are subject to many regulations, which generally vary by state. The minimum age to purchase lottery products is 18 in all states except for Western Australia, where the age was lowered to 16.

Most Australian lottery tickets do not include retailer sales commission; purchases often are not to the whole dollar.

== FutureBall ==
FutureBall is Australia's newest lottery, introduced in 2026 and operated by The Lottery Office, under licence by the Northern Territory Government of Australia.

The game features a fixed A$1 million top prize and is drawn twice a week on Tuesdays and Fridays. Players select six numbers from a pool of 34 and one additional number from a secondary pool of three.

FutureBall includes four prize divisions, with the first division requiring all six main numbers plus the FutureBall and the additional number to be matched.

Unlike traditional Australian lotteries, the game has a unique feature where each possible number combination is only issued once per draw, ensuring that the Million Dollar Division 1 prize is never shared if won.

== The Lott ==
=== Saturday Lotto/TattsLotto ===
Saturday Lotto is a national Saturday night draw conducted by Tattersall's, and is syndicated to all Australian states and territories through the Australian Lotto Bloc. The game is marketed as TattsLotto in Victoria, Tasmania and the Northern Territory; as Gold Lotto in Queensland; as X Lotto in South Australia and simply as Lotto or Saturday Lotto in New South Wales, Australian Capital Territory and Western Australia.

In the absence of poker machines, the Victorian state government awarded Tattersall's the right to conduct a weekly lottery to raise additional revenue to complement the state's health system funding. The first TattsLotto draw, with the first prize of A$50,000, was on 24 June 1972, televised on HSV-7 Melbourne.

TattsLotto, which was the first of its type in Australia, was originally based on the European style 6-from-49 lotteries, where six numbers are selected from 40 in a standard game. Each week, six numbers and one supplementary number were mechanically drawn from a transparent barrel. Each televised draw was live-to air and witnessed by three officials, one from Tattersalls and two representatives from the government. From Draw 413, on 6 July 1985, the current standard game format, six from 45, was introduced to increase the chances at winning a prize. Also from this draw, an additional supplementary number was drawn.

Originally, players would complete an entry ticket of between two and 10 games, at a cost of A$0.60 per game. The ticket consisted of an original and a carbon copy. The player would present the ticket to an agent/seller who would validate both copies of the ticket by inserting the ticket into a designated cash register. The copy would be returned to the player and the original would be kept by the agent/seller and sent to Tattersalls prior to the next draw. In the 80s, the network of agents/sellers were computerised. This allowed a later closing time for each draw, scannable entries with printed tickets, randomly selected computer-generated tickets (known variously as a "Quick Pick", "Pick Quick", "Auto-Pick", "Easi-Pick" or "Slikpik"), more games per draw to be purchased, etc.

Variations to the standard game are commonly known as a system entry. These games cost extra but allow the player to increase their chances of winning. The more numbers selected per game, the greater the outlay. Subsequently, if the selected numbers are drawn, multiple prizes are won.

Currently, the game offers a First Division prize of approximately $4 million each week often shared between multiple winners (for example 4 winners each receive $1 million), with regular $20 million "Superdraws" taking place approximately 6-7 times a year. In addition, there are Megadraws (usually around Christmas/New Year) with jackpots of around $30 million. If there is no division 1 winner in TattsLotto it jackpots to at least $8 million, but this rarely happens; the most recent occurrence as of March 2026 was in March 2026. A minimum of four standard games (or six with a Quick Pick entry) must be purchased at a cost of $0.96 per game, which includes agent's commission.

In 2020, history was made when 27 winners won the superdraw.

The following prize divisions can be won (cumulative probability refers to the probability of winning that division or a higher division, thus the chance of winning any prize is 1 in 42):

Division	Winning Numbers Required	Probability (Single Game)	Cumulative Probability (Single Game)
1st Division	6	1 in 8,145,060	1 in 8,145,060
2nd Division	5 + supplementary	1 in 678,755	1 in 626,543
3rd Division	5	1 in 36,690	1 in 34,659
4th Division	4	1 in 733	1 in 718
5th Division	3 + one or both supplementary	1 in 298	1 in 210
6th Division	3	1 in 53	1 in 42

=== Weekday Windfall ===
Weekday Windfall (Millionaire Medley in Western Australia) (formerly Monday & Wednesday Lotto) is a national lottery game, administered by Tattersall's and played on Monday, Wednesday, and Friday nights.

Its current logo features a large purple hand holding dollar bills.

Entries cost $0.68 per game including agent's commission.

The three weekly draws carry a Division 1 prize of $1 million for up to 6 division one winners.

==== History ====
- 5 November 1979: It began life as a New South Wales-only game administered by New South Wales Lotteries, holding its first draw.
- 1994: Oz Lotto is introduced in NSW, ending NSW Lotto's reign as the only lotto game played in the state (New South Wales being the last state to join the Australian Lotto Bloc, in 2000.)
- April 2004: The game was made identical in structure to Saturday Lotto: six winning numbers and two supplementary numbers are drawn from 45 balls, with its five winning divisions the same.
- May 2006: NSW Lotto began expanding interstate, when the state lottery commissions in South Australia and Western Australia started selling tickets, replacing SA Lotto in the process.
- 13 October 2008: Tattersall's started selling Monday and Wednesday Lotto to its territories – having earlier lost the right to run Wednesday TattsLotto after June.
- Monday 17 May 2010: In South Australia, the game was changed from "Lotto" to its original name in that state, X Lotto, coinciding with a new lotteries system – one change of which was the ability to recognise crosses (as opposed to vertical markings) on the Lotto entry form.
- 21 October 2013: Queensland's Golden Casket began selling tickets in Monday & Wednesday Lotto.
- 20 May 2024: Its name changed to Weekday Windfall (Millionaire Medley in Western Australia). This rebrand added a Friday night draw and increased the number of winners that can get the division 1 prize to 6.

==== Significant Changes ====
NSW Lotteries has seen a number of changes since its introduction in 1979:

- Originally a weekly game played on Mondays, a second "mid-week" draw was added on 21 November 1984. Originally on Wednesdays, this was moved to Thursdays between 1989 and 1996. It was returned to Wednesday following the introduction of Powerball on Thursday nights.
- Originally a 6-from-40 game, the game was first expanded to 44 balls, and then to the current 45. The latest change, introduced on 19 April 2004, brought the NSW game in line with Saturday Lotto.
- A second supplementary number was added on 20 August 1990.
- NSW Lotto previously offered a "Double Up" option for an extra $0.15 per game, which doubled any winning Division 2 to 5 prizes. This was eliminated by the time Tattersall's joined the game.
- From 19 April 2004 until 1 May 2006:
  - Divisions 4 and 5 had fixed prizes of $20 and $10, respectively.
  - Division 1 did not jackpot, and instead a "cash rolldown" applied: if there was no Division 1 winner, all Division 2 to 5 prizes were doubled. (Where Double Up was entered, the rolldown did not double the Double Up portion of the prize, effectively "tripling up" the original prize.)
- From 26 February 2012
  - Division 1 has a fixed prize of $1 million for each winner for up to four winners. In the event that more than four tickets have the winning numbers, the $4 million prize pool is shared among them.
  - Division 1 no longer jackpots.
  - Division 6 added.
- Televised Lotto draws were shown only on the Nine Network's GO! Channel during the coverage of the London Olympics from July–August 2012, they continued to air on the Nine Network up until they aired for the last time on 30 December 2012. From 1 January 2013, Televised Lotto draws began to air solely on GO! as part of changes to the classification code of practice.
- Its name changed to Weekday Windfall, and a Friday draw was added.

=== Oz Lotto ===
Oz Lotto is a national lottery game, administered by Tattersall's and played on Tuesday nights. It was introduced on 26 February 1994 and promoted as the first fully national lotto game, as New South Wales was not a part of the Australian Lotto Bloc at that time. Entries cost $1.20 per game plus agents commission.

Originally, the game was identical as Saturday Lotto, requiring six numbers to be picked out of 45. However, starting 18 October 2005, a seventh main number began to be drawn, greatly lengthening the odds of winning Division 1 (close, but not longer, than that of Powerball). In line with this change, branding for Oz Lotto changed in many states, to emphasise the seventh ball (including new names, such as Super 7's Oz Lotto in Tatts regions, and Oz 7 Lotto in Queensland. However, as of 2012, the game has reverted to the branding of Oz Lotto in these regions). Oz Lotto guarantees a minimum division one prize pool of $4 million. (Formerly $2 Million and $3 Million.) The largest jackpot in Oz Lotto was $100 Million, and it occurred in November 2012 and February 2025. (Although $90 Million and $100 Million draws that occurred as records in 2009 and 2012, they bumped the jackpots up with the $90 Million bumped up to $109 Million, but the $100 Million draw was bumped up to $112 Million due to both of those draws getting so many ticket sales.)

On 17 May 2022, the Lott changed the game's matrix from 7/45 to 7/47, plus an additional supplementary number is also drawn.

Although the draw now requires seven numbers to be selected, the minimum prize level (of 3 winning numbers and one of the supplementary numbers) was unchanged, thus leading to seven prize divisions (cumulative probability refers to the chance of winning that division or a higher division, thus the chance of winning any prize is 1 in 50):

Division	Required Numbers	Probability (Single Game)	Cumulative Probability (Single Game)
1st Division	7	1 in 62,891,499	1 in 62,891,499
2nd Division	6 + supplementary	1 in 2,994,833	1 in 2,858,705
3rd Division	6	1 in 242,824	1 in 223,814
4th Division	5 + one or both supplementaries	1 in 26,270	1 in 23,511
5th Division	5	1 in 4,497	1 in 3,775
6th Division	4	1 in 182	1 in 174
7th Division	3 + one or both supplementaries	1 in 71	1 in 50

=== Powerball ===
Powerball is a lottery game modelled on the highly successful American Powerball game. It is administered by Tattersall's, and syndicated to all states through the Australian Lotto Bloc. Draws take place on Thursday nights, with the first draw held on 23 May 1996. Each Powerball game costs $1.575 which includes agents’s commission, with most states requiring standard games be bought four at a time. Powerball guarantees a minimum division one prize pool of $5 million.

To win first division the player needs to have all regular numbers in their game as well as select the correct Powerball. For coupon entries; the Powerball is selected in a separate box to the winning numbers. In an automated pick a computer randomly allocates the player seven numbers as well as a Powerball for each game line.

On 13 April 2018, the format of Powerball changed to 7 regular balls being drawn at random from a barrel of 35 as well as a Powerball being drawn at random from a barrel of 20 (previously 6 regular balls drawn at random from a barrel of 40). The new format contains nine divisions, increasing the odds of winning an overall prize (previously 1 in 78 per single game) but decreasing the odds of winning the jackpot (previously 1 in 76,767,600 per single game). The new divisions are as follows:

Division	Required Numbers	Probability (Single Game)
1st Division	7 + Powerball	1 in 134,490,400
2nd Division	7	1 in 7,078,442
3rd Division	6 + Powerball	1 in 686,176
4th Division	6	1 in 36,115
5th Division	5 + Powerball	1 in 16,943
6th Division	4 + Powerball	1 in 1,173
7th Division	5	1 in 892
8th Division	3 + Powerball	1 in 188
9th Division	2 + Powerball	1 in 65
Any Prize		1 in 44

Systems entries are available on Powerball, however only one Powerball is selected for a standard system entry. Players can also purchase an entry that guarantees the Powerball for a game entry – this costs the same as playing 20 individual games. This is known in New South Wales, South Australia, Queensland and Tatts' states as a "PowerHit", and in Western Australia as a "Powerpik". System entries and guaranteed Powerball options can sometimes be combined.

A major difference between Australian Powerball versus the US game is that the latter was created in part to allow a player to win by matching only one number, if it is the Powerball. Also, while US Powerball prizes are taxable, its players do not pay agents' commission, so wagers are always a multiple of US$2.

Powerball's largest jackpot prize to date is $200 million and it was drawn on 1 February 2024. The previous highest was $160 million. The biggest individual winner was in May also in 2024, winning $150 million.

As of 1 February 2024, the second highest jackpot is $160 million, after the previous one had no winners.

== The Lottery Office ==
The Lottery Office primarily offers lottery products that are matched to overseas lottery draws. When a player purchases a ticket in one of its Northern Territory Government-licensed games, the company purchases a corresponding ticket in an equivalent overseas lottery using the same selected numbers. If the overseas ticket wins a prize, the winnings are collected by The Lottery Office and the equivalent amount is paid to the player.

In recent years, the company has diversified its product offering beyond its original ticket-matching model. In 2026, it introduced FutureBall, an internally operated lottery conducted under an approved licence in the Northern Territory.

The Lottery Office now includes both international lottery draw-matching products and Australian lottery games.

The lotteries sold by The Lottery Office are as follows:

- FutureBall
- USA Power Lotto aka Powerball (US)
- USA Mega Lotto aka Mega Millions (US)
- European Millions aka EuroMillions (Europe)
- European Jackpot aka Eurojackpot (Europe)
- Italian Super Jackpot aka SuperEnalotto (Italy)
- La Primitiva aka El Gordo de la Primitiva (Spain)
- Irish Lotto aka National Lottery (Ireland)
- UK Lotto aka National Lottery (UK)

== Keno ==
Games of keno are run by The Lottery Corporation in NSW, QLD, Victoria, ACT and South Australia.

=== SA Lotteries Keno ===
SA Lotteries' Keno operates on a continuous basis of one draw every 3.5 minutes, with draws closing 40 seconds before each draw. Results appear on monitors located at most lotteries sales outlets. South Australian Keno can be played using all Spot entries from 1 to 10 numbers. It offers one jackpot prize, for matching all numbers from a Spot 10 ticket, with a minimum prize of $1 million (which was changed from a $1 million fixed prize to a jackpotting prize in February 2001). The probability varies from spot to spot.

Since November 1997, SA Lotteries has syndicated Keno to the Australian Capital Territory's ACTTAB, where it is marketed as ACTTAB Keno.

In May 2010, a "Keno Coin Toss" side-bet feature was added to Keno, which pay on which half of the board ("Heads": numbers 1–40; "Tails": numbers 41–80 – each paying $2 per $1 bet) has more drawn numbers, or whether they are equal, with ten numbers drawn in each half ("Evens" – paying $4 per $1 bet).

=== Other Operators ===
Keno is also popular in clubs, hotels and casinos. The Lottery Corporation runs Keno draws through their casinos in New South Wales and Queensland, and also other gaming venues in these states and in Victoria. SKYCITY Darwin runs NT Keno on behalf of venues in the Northern Territory.

Both these games run continuously (every 3–3.5 minutes), and offer jackpots for each level between 7 and 10 spots (NT Keno also has a Spot 6 jackpot). Both games also have a high/low option called Heads or Tails?, which pre-date and are played identically to the current "Coin Toss" feature in SA Lotteries' Keno. Some NSW venues also offer a Keno Racing game, which groups each line of 10 numbers as a "runner" in a "race" of eight, with positions based on the number and timing of numbers drawn; traditional horse-racing bets are offered such as "Win", "Place", "Trifecta" and so on.

== Set For Life ==
Set For Life is Australia's newest lottery game. Its inaugural draw was held on Friday 7 August 2015. The game was originally announced in February 2015.

Tatts Chief Executive Robbie Cook told the Sydney Morning Herald at the time that "it's everyday dreaming. It's not somebody looking to stop working and hang up their shoes." He also told the publication that the game was specifically aimed at, and designed for, a younger audience, primarily those aged between 20 and 40. The game was based on similar lotteries outside of Australia, such as Cash4Life in the US.

=== Game Structure ===
Set For Life differs significantly from other Australian lotteries, in that the top prize is not paid out in one lump sum, but rather as a fixed sum of $20,000 AUD per month over the course of 20 years (unless more than four people win the top prize in which case the total prize pool of $19,200,000 is split evenly between the winners via monthly instalments, e.g. If 5 people win the top prize each will receive $16,000 a month). Other prize divisions are paid in full, however. There are eight prize tiers in total and draws are held every day at 9pm AEST.

Starting on Draw 1691 on March 23, 2020, the game was redesigned, which changed the term "bonus numbers" to "supplementary numbers", and increased the numbers in the draw from 37 to 44. A new Division 2 prize was also introduced, which rewards the winner the fixed sum of $5,000 AUD per one month for one year, for a grand total of $60,000 AUD. If there are four winners, they share the total Division 2 prize pool. Additionally, the number of main numbers draw was reduced from eight to seven.

To play a game, a player selects seven numbers from a range of one to 44. This set will then be entered into the next seven consecutive nightly days draws and participants must play a minimum of two games.

Two supplementary numbers are drawn after the main seven numbers, giving nine numbers drawn in total. These numbers are used to determine other prizes. To win the jackpot, a player must match all seven regular numbers:

Division	Required Numbers	Probability (Single Set)
1st Division	7	1 in 38,320,568
2nd Division	6 + supplementary	1 in 2,737,183
3rd Division	6	1 in 156,411
4th Division	5 + one or both supplementaries	1 in 25,701
5th Division	5	1 in 3,067
6th Division	4 + one or both supplementaries	1 in 894
7th Division	4	1 in 167
8th Division	3 + one or both supplementaries	1 in 80

== Trackside ==
There is also a computerised racing game is known as Trackside, where players can also bet on a Win, Place, Quinella or Trifecta, and recently First Fours. Trackside has twelve runners in different racing modes: Thoroughbreds, Harness, Hurdles and Greyhounds. The Trackside odds are fixed and do not change regardless of how many people are playing. Trackside is operated by Tabcorp Holdings and is run inside TAB venues. Its original tag-line was Win real money on unreal horses, but when greyhound races were introduced, the tag-line was dropped and the logo changed to a 'T' in a green circle with the word TRACKSIDE written in a different font. The tag-line now is ‘’Unreal Racing, Real Fun’’ and ‘’Simulated Racing’’. Note that greyhound races still use twelve runners to match the horse races, unlike regular greyhound races which always have eight runners in a race (unless eight are not available). The former logo featured a cartoon horse and the name TRACKSIDE written in the Ad Lib (typeface) font. Trackside results can also be viewed on SKYtext teletext channels 698 and 699, however this can seemingly only be viewed inside TAB venues, along with the other SKYtext racing results (previously, Seven Network used to host teletext, but cancelled the service on 30 September 2009, leaving only channel 801 open for closed captions). Recently, the Trackside system has been updated to allow Flexi Trifecta and Flexi First Four bets, where picking multiple runners for each position will give a percentage of the total win (for example, if runner numbers 1 and 2 are picked first and second respectively, and the user picks both 3+4 for third place for a $1 bet, they will receive 50% of the dividend of the 1+2+3 or 1+2+4 trifecta if won). As of December 2012, Flexi bets could only be placed via the EasyBet terminal (EBT) machines, however paper Trackside tickets containing Flexi Trifecta and First Four options have since been produced. During a system update in 2014, the hurdle races were removed, and races have become more frequent, being every three minutes instead of every four minutes. The minimum bet per game is 50 cents, unlike Keno which is $1 per game. There are also "mystery" bets, where the computer can randomly pick the first three or four runners in a boxed trifecta or first four bets. These tickets are a fixed price of $3 and $5 respectively. Recently it also added The Power Runner where boosted odds are taking place for selected runners in Thoroughbred, Greyhound & Harness Racing every Friday & Saturday from 7pm to 8pm.

== Super 66 ==
Super 66 is an Australian lottery game played in all states except New South Wales (which plays Lotto Strike instead). It is a product of The Lott and Lotterywest, and is played on a Saturday night, drawn just after the main TattsLotto draw. Super 66 costs $1.10 per game. A six-digit "winning number" is drawn, and players win prizes by matching either its first or last digits.

It was initially intended as an "add-on" game, and in most states Super 66 could only be bought in conjunction with another game, but has more recently become a standalone game, meaning that it can be bought by itself. Super 66 entries are usually computer-generated although some states allow registered players to record their favourite Super 66 numbers and play them like in other games.

To win First Division, players must match the winning number with their entry exactly. Otherwise, fixed consolation prizes are won if at least the first two or last two digits match. Using 123456 as an example drawn number, there are five divisions:

Division	Example Winning Numbers	Probability (Single Game)	Fixed Prize
1st Division	123456	1 in 1,000,000	Jackpot, minimum $66,666.00
2nd Division	12345x or x23456	1 in 55,556	$6,666.00
3rd Division	1234xx or xx3456	1 in 5,556	$666.00
4th Division	123xxx or xxx456	1 in 556	$66.00
5th Division	12xxxx or xxxx56	1 in 56	$6.60
Any Prize		1 in 50	

The First Division prize can jackpot for 25 consecutive weeks (as of 20 January 2007). On the 26th draw with no winners, the jackpot is "rolled down" to the next highest division with winners.

== State Lotto Draws ==
In addition to the Saturday TattsLotto draw, some state and territory lottery jurisdictions hold their own lottery draws, playable only in their jurisdiction.

=== Lotto Strike ===
Lotto Strike, launched in 1995, is a statewide companion game to NSW Lotto played in New South Wales and the Australian Capital Territory only, and administered by New South Wales Lotteries. Originally based on NSW Lotto's Monday and Wednesday draws, Lotto Strike also became available for play on Saturday Lotto after the midweek NSW Lotto changes in 2004 (instead of Super 66). Lotto Strike costs $1 per game plus agent's commission, and must be bought at the same time as a normal Lotto entry for that draw.

Lotto Strike's winning numbers are the first four balls drawn in order from the corresponding Lotto draw. To win a prize, players must match at least one of their selected balls in the same position as the winning numbers (e.g. player's 2nd number matchies winning 2nd number, etc.). Numbers can be selected manually or through computer "auto-pick". Entries can also be "boxed", producing 24 standard games allowing the numbers to be matched in any order.

The odds of winning Strike Four with a single game is 1 in 3,575,880. There are four prize divisions, named after the number of balls correctly matched in their position:

Division	Required Numbers	Probability (Single Game)
Division 1 (Strike Four)	Four numbers in the correct position	1 in 3,575,880
Division 2 (Strike Three)	Three numbers in the correct position	1 in 21,804
Division 3 (Strike Two)	Two numbers in the correct position	1 in 346
Division 4 (Strike One)	One number in the correct position	1 in 12

The Strike Four jackpot starts at $100,000 and increases with each draw, depending on sales. Due to the relative unpopularity of Lotto Strike, jackpots occur often and it can often take many months for a Strike Four prize to be won. The Strike Four prize is capped at $2 million, with any further jackpots being added to the next Strike Four pool after it is next won.

Although New South Wales is the only state in Australia that plays Lotto Strike, the format is also played in New Zealand with their national Lotto game.

=== Cash 3 ===
Cash 3 is a lottery game played in Western Australia and administered by Lotterywest. The Cash 3 format is also used in several places in the United States. It is drawn daily and the numbers telecast on Channel Seven in Perth, and on GWN in regional Western Australia.

Players select three digits, and may choose to bet on those three digits being drawn in any order, in that specific order, or both. Games can be played for either 50 cents or $1.00, and can be bought up to seven days in advance. Prizes are fixed according to the probability of winning, with the highest possible prize being $500 for a "straight-up" $1 wager.

== Draw Lotteries ==
This section refers to 'traditional' draw style lotteries offered by Australian lottery organisations. In this type of game, a set number of tickets – typically in the low six figures – are offered for sale in each draw. A set of numbers are then drawn (these days by a random number generator) and are awarded prizes, with many consolation prizes often offered.

=== Lucky Lotteries ===
Lucky Lotteries is the current brand name given to draw lotteries administered by Tattersalls, after originally being administered by New South Wales Lotteries. Currently, two lotteries are run under this name: Super Jackpot and Mega Jackpot. (Both denominations exclude agent's commission.) Since March 2015, the lotteries have been available in Tattersalls jurisdictions.

All tickets are "auto-picked" by the computer and are usually allocated sequentially, but those buying 10 numbers or less can have their numbers selected at random. Tickets can be purchased up to 10 draws in advance for Super Jackpot and two draws for Mega Jackpot.

Draws are conducted soon after all tickets are sold at the NSW Lotteries offices, and prizes can be claimed the day after; summaries are often printed in major newspapers. For Super Jackpot, on average one draw occurs each morning at the NSW Lotteries offices, and sometimes more than one. The lesser demand for Mega Jackpot means that a number of weeks often passes between draws. Due to the delay between selling tickets and drawing them (particularly for Super Jackpot), a ticket purchased today may be drawn several days from today; by that time, the jackpot amount advertised may have already been won by an earlier draw. NSW Lotteries now adds a disclaimer to this effect when advertising these lotteries.

In each draw, a first, second and third prize is drawn, as well as a number of smaller prizes down to $10. One-off prizes are awarded to tickets that are one ticket number either side of each cash prize, with a $1,000 cash prize for being one-off first prize, and a number of free tickets for an advance draw of the same lottery for being one-off any other cash prize. (Free tickets are always awarded as a sequential run of numbers.)

A jackpot ticket number is then drawn, separately from the main draw. A jackpot ticket can only be one of the previous tickets drawn which means you must be drawn twice to actually win a jackpot prize. If the ticket number drawn matches a winning number exactly (one-offs do not count), then they win the jackpot; otherwise, that number wins 10 free tickets for an advance draw and the jackpot increments by a certain amount. In recent years the $2 Jackpot – which is statistically more difficult to win than the "6-from-45" TattsLotto-style games – has reached more than $10 million more than once through continued jackpotting. The $5 Mega Jackpot record is $96.04 million, which was won on 27 August 2019.

The differences between the $2 and $5 Jackpot Lotteries can be summarised by the following table (current as to 1 March 2018):

Characteristic	$2 Jackpot Lottery	$5 Jackpot Lottery
Maximum Number of Tickets	270,000	200,000
Total Number of Prizes*	11,896	12,655
First Prize	$100,000	$200,000
Minimum Jackpot	$500,000	$1,000,000
Jackpot Increment	$130,000	$240,000
Odds of Winning Jackpot	1 in 18,385,876	1 in 9,483,167
Odds of Winning a Cash Prize	1 in 68.1	1 in 47.4
Odds of Winning Any Prize	1 in 23.03	1 in 16.14

- Total Number of Prizes: includes one-off prizes and one prize for a non-winning jackpot ticket number.

==== Former Games ====
New South Wales Lotteries have also conducted a number of $10 draw lotteries in the past. The most recent $10 lottery conducted was called Lucky 7, which replaced the Million Dollar Lottery (a non-jackpotting draw lottery that was otherwise similar to the $2 and $5 games) in 1996 and continued until 2001. Each $10 ticket was entered for five consecutive weekly draws.

Three separate numbers were drawn, named after the number of digits in each winning number: Lucky 7 (with numbers ranging from 1000000 to 1999999), Lucky 6 (100000–449999) and Lucky 3 (000–999). Prizes were awarded in a similar manner to Super 66, with a $1 million prize offered for matching the Lucky 7 number exactly, while consolation prizes were awarded for matching the last digits of the other numbers – as few as three digits for the Lucky 6, or two digits for the Lucky 3 number.

=== South Australia: LuckySA Lottery ===
SA Lotteries conducted one LuckySA Lottery draw, launched in June 2007, and conducted on 2 January 2008. This $5 draw lottery offered a top prize of $500,000 and a total of 18 prize-winning numbers (down to $50) out of a maximum of 200,000 tickets. As of 2010, no further draws have been conducted.

== Former Lottery Games ==
=== SA Lotto ===
SA Lotto, previously known as Cross Lotto or X Lotto, was a statewide lottery game played only in South Australia, and administered by South Australian Lotteries. At its winding up, the game was played twice a week, on Mondays and Wednesdays. Games of SA Lotto cost 30 cents plus agent's commission, and offered a $400,000 guaranteed minimum prize for Division One. SA Lotto was replaced with an expanded version of NSW Lotto on 1 May 2006; the game is simply marketed as Lotto, in line with the Saturday version, replacing the SA Lotto brand. (The X Lotto brand was replaced with Lotto and SA Lotto in 1999, since crosses on entry forms were no longer accepted – but was reinstated in May 2010.)

The draw format was the same as for the Saturday draw, with six winning numbers and two supplementary numbers drawn from 45. SA Lotto was notable in that there were six divisions instead of five, with an additional division for games with four matching winning numbers, plus a supplementary number. The First Division pool was last increased, from $300,000 to $400,000, in November 2003, at the same time as the re-introduction of a mid-week draw on Wednesdays, which had previously been replaced by Powerball.

=== Wednesday TattsLotto ===
Wednesday TattsLotto was a product of Tattersalls and was played in their territories (Victoria, Tasmania, Australian Capital Territory and the Northern Territory). Started in February 2000, six winning numbers and two supplementary numbers are drawn from 40 balls – less than the Saturday version of the game. Each game cost 50 cents plus agent's commission. As with Tatts Keno, Tatts Scratchies and Tatts 2, Tattersalls were not permitted to operate these games under the Victorian government licensing regime which commenced on 1 July 2008.

Prize divisions were the same as Saturday TattsLotto, with a minimum First Division prize of $100,000 – the odds of winning were 1 in 3,838,380, or about twice as likely as the Saturday draw. However, they were slightly easier to win due to the reduced number of balls used.

=== Wednesday Gold Lotto ===
Wednesday Gold Lotto was a statewide lottery game played in Queensland, and administered by Golden Casket, the Queensland Lotteries Corporation. Started in 1996, Wednesday Gold Lotto was played like Saturday Lotto, with games costing 50 cents each plus agent's commission.

The main point of difference being in its unusual First Division system: instead of offering a jackpotting prize pool shared by all Division 1 winners, Wednesday Gold Lotto guaranteed a fixed $1 million prize for up to four separate winners in each draw, with the $4 million prize pool only being divided among its winners if more than four match all six numbers in one draw. Unclaimed first division prizes were used to fund future Division 1 prizes, or for other promotional purposes.

The final Queensland-only Wednesday Gold Lotto draw was held on 16 October 2013, with Golden Casket joining the national Monday & Wednesday Lotto draws (branded Monday & Wednesday Gold Lotto) from 21 October 2013.

=== Casket ===
Casket (or the $2 Casket) was the name given to the draw lottery administered by Queensland's lottery operator, Golden Casket. The name of the game dates back to the first Queensland draw lotteries – with cash prizes originally prohibited by law, the first prize was awarded as a casket of gold valued at a certain amount, which was then immediately bought back from winners for its cash value. The first Casket draw was held on 14 June 1917, with the final draw (Draw 301) held on 3 April 2013.

Draws were held about seven times a year (the draw dates of which are fixed in advance), and a maximum of 110,000 tickets (at $2 each) were sold for each draw. Specific numbers could be selected by the player when buying a Casket ticket (as long as the number has not already been selected), or otherwise automatically allocated through a Quick Pick.

Each draw had a first prize of $100,000, and consolation prizes were drawn to as low as $5. There was no jackpot component. One-off prizes were also drawn, although unlike New South Wales these were paid in cash, with the most common prize being $2 for being one-off any the numbers outside the first three prizes. There were 7,089 prizes awarded in each $2 Casket draw (including one-off prizes), making the odds of winning any prize around 1 in 15.5.

=== Tatts 2 ===
Tatts 2 was a Tattersall's product played only in its territories. It is one of the simplest games that can be played. A player selected 2 numbers from (1–99) in each game; which cost 55c. Each night at about 7:00 two numbers from (1–99) were drawn.

Those players matching either number won a fixed prize of $3. Those matching both numbers then shared the remainder of the prize pool, with a minimum prize of $500. In some draws (usually once a week), both the 1 Number prize and the 2 Number minimum prize were doubled. The odds of matching both numbers with a single entry was 1 in 4,851.

There was the provision for a jackpot for the 2 Number prize, which could jackpot for five weeks before being rolled down into the 1 Number dividend. However jackpots very rarely occurred.

=== Tatts Keno ===
Tatts Keno was administered by Tattersall's and played in most areas that offer their lottery products (Victoria, Tasmania and Australian Capital Territory) – Tatts Keno could not be played in the Northern Territory. Tatts Keno was a daily game, and entries could vary from 3 to 10 spots.

Tatts Keno offered one jackpot prize, for matching all numbers from a Spot 10 ticket. The minimum jackpot prize was $250,000, however this often increased to over $1 million as it tended to take a large number of draws for the jackpot to be won. Tatts Keno was replaced by Intralot's Lucky Keno 70 from 1 July 2008.

=== Intralot ===
From 1 July 2008, Intralot was introduced into Victoria following changes to lottery licensing by the Victorian Government, and was subsequently introduced into Tasmania. After originally branding its games under the name The Luck Factory, Intralot now brands its lotteries using its own name. However, Intralot announced on 25 October 2014, that they would cease operating in Victoria, with effect from 1 February 2015.

Games that were conducted by Intralot include:

==== Lucky Bingo Star ====
First drawn on 6 July 2008, and drawn each Sunday at 8pm. Although known officially in rules and Intralot's licence as TV Bingo, the draw is currently broadcast live on radio, through 3AW.

Entries cost $1.10 each (including agent's commission), with a minimum purchase of 3 games, and can only be purchased via "quick pick". Prizes are won for matching the four corners, or a diagonal cross, within the first 25 numbers, or a "full house" within 50 numbers (with odds of 1:212,085). A jackpot "snowball" prize (minimum $500,000) is won if a "full house" is made within 44 numbers (odds of 1:14,638,344).

In the original incarnation, the diagonal cross was allowed to be made within 27 numbers, the corners within 28, and further numbers would be drawn until the "full house" prize was won.

==== Lucky Lines ====
First drawn on 1 July 2008, and drawn daily at 7pm. Games cost $1.10 each (including agent's commission), and requires the selection of numbers in a 3x3 grid, with the centre square provided "free", and five numbers to be selected in each other square, starting from numbers 1–5 in the top-left, up to 36–40 in the bottom-right. Prizes are won for how many lines of three numbers (horizontally, vertically, or diagonally) are matched, with a jackpot (minimum $9,000) for matching all eight numbers and therefore, all eight lines. Known as Cross and Match in Intralot's licence, and the official rules.

==== Lucky 5 Red or Black ====
First drawn on 1 June 2009, and drawn daily at 7:30pm. Games cost $0.55 each (including agent's commission) with a minimum of two games. Five numbers from 35 are drawn, plus either "red" or "black". A jackpot (minimum $50,000) is won for matching all five numbers plus the correct colour, with fixed minor prizes down to four numbers, or three with the correct colour.

==== Lucky 3 ====
First drawn on 1 June 2009, and similar to Lotterywest's Cash 3 game above: a three-digit number is drawn each night at 6:30pm. Games cost $1.10 each (including agent's commission). Exact matches of the number win a fixed $500 prize; matches of the number in "any order" win a fixed $20 prize. Unlike Cash 3, the "any order" wins are a consolation prize to the "exact order" major prize, rather than a separate bet.

==== Lucky Keno ====
Lucky Keno is a keno game operated by Intralot, and played in their territories of Victoria and Tasmania. It is drawn daily at 8:00pm (Melbourne time). The game started as Lucky Keno 70, with 20 numbers drawn from 70 (instead of the traditional 80) twice a day. The original game had a Spot 10/Match 10 prize of $400,000, and a "bonus" wager offered a jackpot which increased this to a minimum of $1 million.

Starting from 15 March 2010 (Draw 1245), Lucky Keno was changed to a 20-from-80 game drawn once a day, with a fixed A$2 million prize for Spot 10/Match 10 – matching the previous maximum jackpot prize of its predecessor, Tatts Keno. Wagers can be made with between 3 and 10 "spotted" numbers.

As Lucky Keno 70, a "Hi-Lo" bet was also available, which won if 13 or more numbers fell on the correctly predicted half of the available balls (Low: numbers 1–35; High: numbers 36–70). The bonus wager and the Hi-Lo game is no longer available since 15 March 2010.

=== Soccer Pools ===
The Australian Soccer Pools (usually branded as The Pools, 6 From 38 Pools, or Soccer Pools) was a national lotto-type game, administered by SA Lotteries. Rather than being drawn at random, the winning numbers were selected based on the results of association football matches, either in Australia (typically state leagues) or the northern hemisphere depending on the time of year. Six winning numbers were selected from 38, but only one supplementary number. Draws closed on Saturday afternoon where Australian games are used, or Saturday evening in the case of Northern Hemisphere match weeks. Entries cost $0.50 per game plus agent's commission.

Matches were drawn from a match list and numbered (1-60). Those numbered 1–38 are the ones that were generally used, with the remainder being reserve matches, which replaced any matches from the first 38 which are postponed or otherwise voided. Once all game results were known, games were ranked in this order, from highest to lowest:

- Drawn games, with higher scoring draws ranking higher (e.g. a 3–3 result will rank higher than 2–2), and scoreless draws (0–0) ranking lowest;
- Away team wins, with scores with a smaller goal difference ranking higher (e.g. a 2–3 result will rank higher than 1–3), followed by total goals scored (e.g. 2–3 will rank higher than 1–2); and
- Home team wins, with scores with a smaller goal difference again ranking higher, followed by total goals scored.

Once the games were ranked, the numbers of the six highest-ranked games became the winning numbers, with the seventh becoming the supplementary. In the case of any ties (i.e. two games with the same score), the higher game number was ranked higher (i.e. game 38 highest, 1 lowest).

Where reserve matches were required, they were used in order starting from 39, and substituted voided matches starting from lowest to highest. Where less than 38 matches in total were played, or in the unlikely event where fewer than seven results were declared, state rules varied. In its home state of South Australia, the remaining winning numbers were to be drawn from a barrel. However, where licence rules in other states did not permit this method of resolution, some lotteries instead withdrew their entries from the lottery bloc, instead re-entering them into the next Pools draw.

The Pools offered the same five divisions as Saturday Lotto; the odds of winning Division One with a single game were 1 in 2,760,681. The Pools usually had a minimum first division prize of $60,000, but jackpotted often:

Division	Required numbers	Probability (single game)
Division 1	6	1 in 2,760,681
Division 2	5 + supplementary	1 in 460,114
Division 3	5	1 in 14,842
Division 4	4	1 in 371
Division 5	3 + supplementary	1 in 297
Any Prize		1 in 163

On 23 June 2018, The Pools was removed from the Australian Lottery Market.

== Instants (Scratchies) ==
All Australian lottery companies offer "Scratchies" or instants which can be purchased at outlets. Players scratch and try to match numbers, complete puzzles or reveal codes to obtain a prize. Instants come in many varieties, usually at $1.10, $2, $4, $5, $10, $15 and $20 price levels and include:

Ticket Type	Jackpot Prize	Odds of Winning Jackpot	Odds of Winning Any Prize
$1 ($1.10 in NSW)	$10,000	1 in 625,000	1 in 4
$2	$25,000	1 in 300,000	1 in 4
$4	$50,000	1 in 810,000	1 in 3
$5	$100,000	1 in 750,000	1 in 4
$5 Crosswords	$100,000	1 in 1,700,000	1 in 4
$5 Mystery Crosswords	$100,000	1 in 800,000	1 in 4
$5 Live the Life	$1,000 a week for five years	1 in 750,000	1 in 4
$10	$250,000	1 in 670,500	1 in 4
$10 Jumbo Crosswords	$150,000	1 in 720,000	1 in 3
$10 Live the Life	$1,000 a week for ten years	1 in 642,600	1 in 4
$15 Crosswords Book	$200,000	1 in 350,000	1 in 3
$20 Jackpot	$500,000	1 in 300,000	1 in 3
$20 Platinum Payouts	$500,000	1 in 450,000	1 in 3

Although games are often shared between lottery companies, scratchies purchased in one Australian state are not often exchangeable in another.

== Superdraw ==
A Superdraw is the term given to a Saturday Lotto draw with a much larger guaranteed jackpot pool than usual. Members of the Australian Lotto Bloc use part of their revenue from normal weekly draws to fund these special draws, which occur seven times a year. In the days of the "Second Draw", Superdraw pools – like regular first division pools – were split evenly between the two draws (usually $8 million each at the time), however now all the funds are pooled into the one draw, resulting in a higher headline figure.

In recent years Superdraws have seen guaranteed First Division prize pools of around $20 million. Since 1999, the last Superdraw of each year is often known as a "Megadraw" – its guaranteed First Division pool is larger still, with the 2006 Megadraw's First Division pool amassing $33 million.The end-of-year Megadraw – which began as a "Millennium Megadraw" on 31 December 1999 – is conducted on or around New Year's Eve; First Division pools in these draws are generally $30 million or more.

Since the expansion of New South Wales' Monday and Wednesday Lotto interstate, Superdraws have also appeared on Monday Lotto, where a First Division pool of $5 million is offered. As a single-state game NSW Lotteries ran more occasional promotions, such as "Anniversary Weeks" based around the anniversary of NSW Lotto's beginnings in November 1979.

== See also ==
- Australian Newsagents' Federation
- The Lott
- New South Wales Lotteries
- South Australian Lotteries
- Golden Casket
- Tatts Lottery
- Tatts Group
- Lotterywest
- The Lottery Office
