= South Australian Lotteries =

- South Australian Lotteries logo

Agency overview
- Parent agency: The Lottery Corporation
- Website: https://thelott.com/salotteries

South Australian Lotteries (SA Lotteries), is a lottery company that operates in the Australian state of South Australia. While the license to operate lotteries in South Australia is owned by the South Australian Government they in turn appointed Tatts Group Pty Ltd as the Master Agent and license holder. SA Lotteries operates under Tatts Group's master brand the Lott.

SA Lotteries syndicates national games (including X-Lotto (Mon/Wed/Sat), Powerball, Oz Lotto, The Soccer Pools). SA Lotteries also has its own version of Keno.

In November 1965, a referendum was passed in South Australia which allowed for the establishment of a state owned lottery company. The first tickets went on sale on 15 March 1967.

On 10 December 2012 after a direct tender process the government of South Australia appointed Tatts Group Pty Ltd as the holder of South Australian Lottery Licenses and administrator of all of SA Lotteries games. The license was granted to Tatts Group for a period of 40 years. The government continues to have oversight of the newly appointed SA Lotteries (Tatts group Pty Ltd) through the retention of the Lotteries Commission of SA (Also known as SA Lotteries).

== See also ==
- Lotteries in Australia
