= Tatts Group =

Lottery company based in Australia

- Industry: Gambling
- Founded: October 2006
- Fate: Merged with Tabcorp under the Tabcorp brand
- Headquarters: Queensland, Australia
- Products: Wagering; Lotteries; Gaming machines
- Net income: ▲$251.96 million A$ (FY 2015)
- Subsidiaries: UBET, Bytecraft, Maxgaming, TattsOnline

Tatts Group was an Australian gambling company. In 2017 the company merged with Tabcorp Holdings Limited under the Tabcorp brand.

== Tatts Group history ==
The company had three divisions: Lotteries, Wagering and Gaming Solutions.

=== Lotteries ===
Tatts Group had a near monopoly on lotteries in Australia. Tatts Lotteries is the Lotteries Operating Unit of Tatts Group and as of September 2013 the company owned or leased:

- Tatts Lottery, which operates lotteries in Victoria, Tasmania and the Northern Territory
- Golden Casket, which exclusively operates lotteries in Queensland
- NSW Lotteries, which operates lotteries in New South Wales and the Australian Capital Territory
- SA Lotteries. which exclusively operates lotteries in South Australia

On 1 June 2016 Tatts Group created a national lottery brand called The Lott. The brand encompasses all its jurisdictional lottery brands under this single entity. Corresponding with the change in branding, online lottery purchases were moved from Tatts.com to the new official lotteries website thelott.com.

On 24 May 2022 Tabcorp demerged its lotteries and keno business from its wagering business. The newly formed The Lottery Corporation operates the exclusive lotteries licences previously held by Tabcorp and floated on the ASX on 1 June 2022 with a market value of $10.5 billion.

=== Racing and sports wagering ===
Tatts Group holds wagering licences under its subsidiary UBET in Queensland, South Australia, the Northern Territory and Tasmania. Most of these assets were previously owned by UniTAB before it merged with Tattersalls Limited to form the modern Tatts Group in 2007. All of the licences entitle the company to the exclusive operation of physical betting shops which offer totaliser, fixed odds and sports wagering in their respective jurisdictions. The company also operates online nationally as Ubet.com providing racing and sports wagering products.

Its shops operated under several different brand names due to its string of acquisitions, including TAB, TattsBet, Unitab, and others. On 27 November 2014, Tatts Group announced that it would begin to unify all of its wagering properties under the new brand UBET in 2015.

=== Gaming solutions ===
Comprising two companies, Maxgaming and ByteCraft. Tatts Group both operates and provides services for electronic gaming machines (known in Australian slang as "pokies", shortened from "poker machines").

==== Maxgaming ====
Provides monitoring and value adding services to the Australian gaming machine industry. Many Australian state governments have legislated mandatory monitoring for all gaming machines they license, to protect the integrity of the industry. Under this system, Monitoring Licences are granted to independent companies who operate computer networks connected to all gaming machines within a relevant jurisdiction. All machine activity is monitored to ensure that correct prizes are paid and taxes are calculated correctly on revenue.

MaxGaming holds licences for three jurisdictions: New South Wales, Queensland and The Northern Territory. Queensland is the only monitoring licence that isn't exclusive, nonetheless MaxGaming still has around an 80% market share in that state.

==== ByteCraft ====
ByteCraft is an electronics specialisation company that Tatts Group Acquired primarily to maintain gaming machines. However the company isn't limited to gaming machines as its major contract is for the maintenance of Telstra's payphone networks.

== Discontinued operations ==
=== Tatts Pokies ===
Tatts Pokies operated over 13,000 gaming machines in Victoria starting from 1994. However the company's licence expired on 16 August 2012 and was not renewed.

The expiration of the licence led Tatts to sue The State of Victoria for compensation under a contract government signed with them in the mid-1990s. In the contract the Victorian state government signed, Tatts Group would be entitled to compensation for the infrastructure they had to pay for to set up their Tatts Pokies operation. The government materially benefited from this infrastructure.

The government argued that the contract stated that compensation would be paid if "licences" were granted to any other party from 2012, but instead they granted "entitlements" to other operators and thus alleged they didn't have to pay the compensation.

On 26 June 2014 The Supreme Court of Victoria found that the "entitlements" were in effect licences under the contract government signed, and awarded Tatts Group $451,157,286 Australian Dollars plus court costs and interest.

Tabcorp Holdings also sued The State of Victoria under a separate agreement it had made with government, however the Supreme court of Victoria said that their agreement clearly only referred to the specific licences of the time and thus Victorian Government owed no compensation to Tabcorp. Tabcorp has since appealed this verdict.

On 8 July 2014 The State of Victoria lodged an appeal in an attempt to avoid paying Tatts Group the compensation. Tatts has stated it will defend the appeal.

=== Talarius PLC ===
Talarius PLC operates gaming machine arcades in the United Kingdom under the brands Quicksilver, Winners and Silvers. The company operates more slot machines in the United Kingdom than any other company, with 7,461 machines spread across 173 venues. Tatts Group sold the UK slot business in 2016 to Austrian gambling equipment manufacturer Novomatic Group for $210 million.

== History ==
The history of Tattersall's can be traced back to George Adams in 1881. Adams moved to Australia from England at the age of 16 and worked in many positions including publican, stockbroker and baker. While working as a publican in Sydney in 1881, Adams took bets on horse races, which could be considered the start of his gambling business.

However, the company started a serious lottery when Adams moved to Hobart in 1895, a move supported by the Tasmanian Government. He set up his first operation there and eventually the company grew and developed in other states.

=== Tote Tasmania ===
Tote Tasmania
- Trade name: UBET
- Type: Corporation
- Industry: Gambling
- Headquarters: Hobart, Tasmania
- Key people: Michael Kent (Chairman); Craig Coleman (CEO)
- Products: Totalisator wagering Sports Betting
- Website: totetasmania.com.au

Tote Tasmaniawas a Government of Tasmania owned company, with its shares being held by the Treasurer and Minister for Racing. It had an exclusive right to conduct parimutuel (totalisator) wagering in the state of Tasmania. The company was privatised and sold to Tatts Group for AU$103 million and merged into their operations in 2012.

== Inheritance ==
When Tattersall's was founded, George Adams structured the company so the original workers' families would inherit the profits. This created so-called "Tattersall's heirs": subsequent generations inherited a share in the company's profits.

Amongst the subsequent beneficiaries was the general manager's granddaughter Helen Harvey, a close friend of Port Arthur massacre gunman Martin Bryant.

In 2005 the company decided to list on the Australian Securities Exchange "Tattersall's heirs" were now allowed to sell their stake in the company and for the first time the public could buy into it. After the listing on the stock exchange local newspapers and other news media listed the names of these "Heirs".

== Merger with Tabcorp ==
On 22 December 2017, Tatts Group merged with Tabcorp and is now traded under the ASX security code TAH.

== See also ==
- Lotteries in Australia
- Gambling in Australia
