= Winners & Losers season 1 =

Season of television series

Winners & Losers
- Season 1
- DVD cover art
- No. of episodes: 22

Release
- Original network: Seven Network
- Original release: 22 March – 23 August 2011

Season chronology
- Next → Season 2

The first season of the drama television series Winners & Losers originally aired between 22 March and 23 August 2011 on the Seven Network in Australia. The season consisted of 22 episodes and aired on Tuesdays at 8:30 pm, replacing Packed to the Rafters.

== Production ==
The season was first aired on the Seven Network in Australia on 22 March 2011. The executive producer was John Holmes and the producer was Maryanne Carroll. Level Two Music helped to supply music for the series.

== Cast ==
=== Main ===
- Melissa Bergland as Jenny Gross
- Virginia Gay as Frances James
- Zoe Tuckwell-Smith as Bec Gilbert
- Melanie Vallejo as Sophie Wong
- Damien Bodie as Jonathan Kurtiss
- Blair McDonough as Matt O'Connor
- Stephen Phillips as Zach Armstrong (19 episodes)
- Tom Wren as Doug Graham
- Denise Scott as Trish Gross
- Francis Greenslade as Brian Gross (20 episodes)
- Sarah Grace as Bridget Fitzpatrick (16 episodes)
- Jack Pearson as Patrick Gross (20 episodes)

=== Recurring ===
- Mike Smith as Callum Gilbert (17 episodes)
- Paul Moore as Wes Fitzpatrick (12 episodes)
- Mark Leonard-Winter as JB Bartlett (8 episodes)
- Nick Simpson-Deeks as Rhys Mitchell (7 episodes)
- Nell Feeney as Carolyn Gilbert (7 episodes)
- Natalie Walker as Donna Wong (6 episodes)
- Michala Banas as Tiffany Turner (5 episodes)
- Geoff Morrell as Paul Armstrong (5 episodes)
- Carmen Duncan as Prof. Kerry Green (4 episodes)
- Dan Feurerriegel as Jake Peters (4 episodes)
- Glenda Linscott as Lily Patterson (4 episodes)
- PiaGrace Moon as Jasmine Patterson (4 episodes)

=== Guests ===
- Lawrence Mooney as Trevor Myers (3 episodes)
- Greg Stone as Steve Gilbert (3 episodes)
- Nicki Paull as Leanne O'Connor (3 episodes)
- Judith McGrath as Maria Crawley (2 episodes)
- Rob Mills as Sean Brody (2 episodes)
- Jacob Allan as Chugga McKinnon (2 episodes)
- Natalie Saleeba as Claire Armstrong (2 episodes)
- Todd McKenney as Bryce Thomson (1 episode)
- Julia Blake as Gwen Armstrong (1 episode)
- John Flaus as Don Armstrong (1 episode)
- Madeleine West as Deidre Gross (1 episode)
- Kevin Harrington as Nev Barnsworth (1 episode)
- Jacqueline Brennan as Gayleen Longbrook (1 episode)

==== Casting ====
The season had a cast of twelve actors who received star billing. Melissa Bergland, Zoe Tuckwell-Smith, Melanie Vallejo and Virginia Gay portrayed the four protagonists or "losers"; Jenny Gross, Bec Gilbert, Sophie Wong and Frances James respectively. During early production, the four actresses were forced to spend time together to build up chemistry between them. Former Neighbours actors Blair McDonough and Damien Bodie played Matt O'Connor and Jonathan Kurtiss. Tom Wren portrayed Doug Graham, Sophie's best friend. Stephen Phillips starred as Zach Armstrong, Frances' business partner and love interest. Comedian Denise Scott appeared as Trish Gross, while Francis Greenslade portrayed Brian Gross, Jenny's parents. Jack Pearson and Sarah Grace portrayed Jenny's siblings Patrick and Bridget Gross.

A number of secondary characters were also portrayed throughout the season, including Michala Banas as Tiffany Turner, the woman who bullied Jenny, Bec, Sophie and Frances during high school. PiaGrace Moon was cast as Frances' younger sister Jasmine Patterson. Lawrence Mooney appeared as Trevor Myers, Geoff Morrell as Paul Armstrong, Mark Leonard Winter as James 'JB' Bartlett, Madeleine West as Deidre Gross, Scott McGregor as Brett, Todd McKenney as Jenny's Boss and Alex Perry as a Fashion Presenter.

== Episodes ==
No. overall	No. in season	Title	Directed by	Written by	Original release date	Australian viewers
1	1	"Covert Aggression in Netball"	Nicholas Bufalo	Margaret Wilson and Bevan Lee	22 March 2011	1.726
Four best friends from high school have little in common, besides the fact that they all were 'the losers' in high school who tried to avoid the attentions of the popular school bully, Tiffany Turner. Now twenty seven-years-old and happy with their lives, the friends receive a surprise invitation to their ten-year reunion.
2	2	"Those People in the Paper"	Nicholas Bufalo	Margaret Wilson and Bevan Lee	29 March 2011	1.700
As Bec, Frances and Sophie celebrate their eight million dollar lottery win, Jenny reacts badly to missing out. Despite Bec's best attempts to help talk Sophie and Frances into sharing, Jenny's over-the-top rant seemingly seals her fate. But when a series of events leads the girls to question the value of friendship in their lives, a decision is made to split the prize money four ways. Now all of them are multi-millionaires. And, more importantly, well and truly part of each other's lives once more.
3	3	"Reality Bites"	Steve Jodrell	Margaret Wilson	29 March 2011	1.544
As the money arrives, the reality of the win forces Bec, Jenny, Frances and Sophie to reassess direction of their lives. A misunderstanding, a friendship challenged and a relationship on the brink forces them all to make life altering decisions.
4	4	"Worlds Collide"	Steve Jodrell	Dan Bennett	5 April 2011	1.522
Jenny throws a party to celebrate Bec and Matt setting the wedding date. The event brings everyone together for the first time ― and with it, more than a few surprises. The morning after the night before sees all the girls dealing with ramifications of the evening, before Bec makes a shock announcement regarding her special day.
5	5	"Fascinator Rhythm"	Ian Gilmour	Bevan Lee	12 April 2011	1.525
It's Race Day and the girls take to the fields. Launching their new business, Frances and Zach have organised a marquee, but some nasty advice from one of Zach's former colleagues leaves Frances wondering if her new partner can be trusted. Meanwhile, Sophie has a coincidental meeting with a former university Professor that reignites a painful memory for her. Tiffany underestimates the girls' re-formed friendship when she arrives telling Jenny she's suing her for public humiliation.
6	6	"Peace of the Past"	Ian Gilmour	Boaz Stark	19 April 2011	1.341
Bec is faced with a tough choice when Tiffany reveals her life is in tatters and risks losing custody of her children. All she needs is cash for a lawyer. Bec is left torn. Against better judgement, Bec refuses to lend Tiffany the money. Having been asked to help organise Bridget and Wes' big day, Jenny gets a little too carried away and changes all of Bridget's wedding plans. Annoyed, Bridget accuses Jenny of interfering because Jenny's never going to find a guy and have one of her own. Sophie invites her parents over for lunch to tell them about her lottery win. After softening them with expensive gifts, Sophie's shocked and offended when her father concludes she's got the money because she's a prostitute.
7	7	"Like a Virgin"	Nicholas Bufalo	Faith McKinnon	3 May 2011	1.385
Jenny is forced to admit that she's still a virgin when Bec, Frances and Sophie talk about their 'first times', so Jenny sets out to find a man and do the deed with him. Frances is stunned when she realises she has romantic feelings for Zach, but Jonathan tells her it's been obvious for some time. Bec visits Tiffany to check in on her after suicide attempt and while helping her pack up her things, Bec realises that Tiffany's not the only one holding onto the past.
8	8	"Secrets and Lies"	Nicholas Bufalo	Sandy Webster	10 May 2011	1.459
Bec confronts Matt and demands to know if he really wants to marry her. Meanwhile, Frances's feelings for Zach start to get the better of her. Then, Sophie's lawyer presses her for information to provoke sympathy from the judge, but Sophie keeps certain details to herself. After Doug gives an emotional speech, she gets off the drug charges with a good behaviour bond.
9	9	"One Door Opens"	Grant Brown	Phil Lloyd	17 May 2011	1.492
Bec grapples with her suspicions over Matt's fidelity. Despite trying not to think the worst, Bec finally confronts him. Sophie faces the demons of her past but her increasingly reclusive lifestyle begins to affect her relationships with her friends. After shutting everyone out, Doug finally gets through to her via some harsh home truths. Meanwhile, Frances becomes caught in the middle of Zach and his father, and Jenny gears up for her first date with Rhys.
10	10	"Countdown"	Grant Brown	Faith McKinnon	24 May 2011	1.516
Bec and Matt's dinner brings out a night of highs and lows. Frances still isn't sure about what Zach thinks of her dating his father. Sophie is worried Doug is keeping his distance, while Jenny is falling hard for Rhys despite opinions about his genuineness and suspicions that he might actually be gay. For one of the girls, the night ends with a shocking conclusion.
11	11	"Smelling the Roses"	Bill Hughes	Dan Bennett	31 May 2011	1.433
Bec experiences an emotional breakdown, Jenny and Trish come to support her, but it's really Matt she wants to see. JB is frustrated at Sophie as she negates his attempts to get to know her more. Meanwhile, Frances is left to babysit Jonathan's niece and nephew and after watching Paul and Zach with the kids, she realises just how different the two of them are.
12	12	"Out of Left Field"	Bill Hughes	Trent Roberts	7 June 2011	1.472
Two relationships bloom and two unravel when a power failure hits the inner city. A week after her breakdown, Bec's just beginning to put herself back together, but she then sees Matt with another woman. Jenny is insistent about impressing Rhys's parents, but is shocked when she finds out what Rhys has been hiding. Zach and Frances share a bottle of wine and share stories about Zach's dad. Meanwhile, Sophie decides it's time to take her relationship with JB to the next level.
13	13	"What Doesn't Kill You..."	Pino Amenta	Clare Atkins	14 June 2011	1.567
A serious car crash turns the girls' worlds upside down.
14	14	"Two Point Oh"	Pino Amenta	Leigh McGrath	21 June 2011	1.508
After experiencing the horror of the car accident, Sophie is feeling in control but feels she needs to end her relationship with JB; she finds it hard as she's never broken up with a guy before.
15	15	"Happiness is a Delusion"	San Davies	Kirsty Fisher	28 June 2011	1.451
Somewhat splintered following the accident, the girls each grapple with their own separate game of real-life charades. Seduced by the lure of popularity and acceptance, Jenny throws herself further into Sean's party world, raising concerns for the Gross family. When Zach's grandparents arrive unexpectedly, Frances discovers he's told them that he and Frances are a couple, and while going along with the act, both are confronted by what feelings come up. Meanwhile, Bec and Doug are determined to take things slow and keep their burgeoning relationship secret – but this proves to be harder than expected.
16	16	"Dialling Up the Crazy"	San Davies	David Hannam	5 July 2011	1.408
Jasmine, Frances' half-sister, ransacks Frances' office and takes her computer, as a way of getting her attention and to get to know her. When Callum stumbles upon Bec and Doug's new romance, they are forced to tell Matt and Sophie that they're officially together. They publicly take the news well, but at Callum's birthday party, Matt says to Bec that they're not over. Sophie gets the feeling that someone is stalking her, which is confirmed when someone breaks into her apartment while she is the shower. Meanwhile, Jenny shies away from Callum's party, not wanting to show her face after Sean humiliated her.
17	17	"The Pink Dog"	Paul Moloney	Jo Martino	12 July 2011	1.412
Jenny and her siblings discuss the option that Mrs Gross could be menopausal when she begins behaving in an unusual manner, but after she goes to the doctor and a lump is found in her breast, Jenny is devastated by the thought that her mother has cancer. Meanwhile Frances and Jasmine get together, after Frances manages to save Jasmine from being arrested for shoplifting. Matt and Bec have another talk about their relationship, with Bec admitting she still loves him, and him saying he wants to marry her - all she has to do is say yes.
18	18	"Mum's the Word"	Paul Moloney	Alix Beane	19 July 2011	1.424
Mrs Gross gets the results and finds she has cancer, but when Bridget and Wes announce they're expecting, she doesn't want to have surgery so soon, leaving Jenny with no other choice but to tell her brother and sister. Frances asks Jasmine if she wants to move in with her, after their mother is about to move to another city with her new boyfriend. Bec and her mother go to a retreat and her mother tells Bec not to make the same mistake she did by not forgiving her father. Sophie is still getting phone calls from her stalker.
19	19	"We Are Family"	Jet Wilkinson	Faith McKinnon	2 August 2011	1.465
Zach organises a weekend away with Frances and Jonathan to discuss a strategy for the next major pitch, and Frances asks Sophie to come with them. Meanwhile, Mrs Gross's impending surgery is on everyone's mind, and when Jenny's sister Deidre arrives, disagreements and old tensions come to the surface. Bec breaks up with Doug after kissing Matt. Sophie's building is burned down while she's away, and the police arrest Jake for arson.
20	20	"It's Written in the Stars"	Jet Wilkinson	Dan Bennett	9 August 2011	1.360
Sophie starts to apologise to all her old flings, and finds out that JB is actually her stalker. Frances and Zach's new relationship makes them lose a potential client, so they decide to keep things strictly business in the office. Bec tells the girls about her and Matt, and although they're outraged about it at first, they give Bec the courage to finally try things again.
21	21	"Eat, Pray, Love"	Pino Amenta	Trent Roberts	16 August 2011	1.443
Mrs Gross's surgery is a complete success, so Jenny makes a one million dollar donation to the hospital, as she promised God she would give away all her money if he made her mother cancer free. Sophie is about to tell Doug how she feels about him at a romantic dinner, but Doug tells her he's going to London for a year as part of the hospital exchange program. Meanwhile, Bec and Matt try to get a fast wedding going, but Matt realises that Bec is doing it just to protect him from the shame of their last attempt, and stops it just in time.
22	22	"Second Chances"	Pino Amenta	Dan Bennett	23 August 2011	1.433
Wedding bells ring as Bec and Matt's happy day finally arrives. Frances, content with Zach, remains oblivious to Claire's true intentions, and their relationship bliss only fuels the fire. Jenny decides to go to Uni to become a teacher. Sophie, determined to keep her feelings quiet, doesn't want to deter Doug's decision to go to London, but saying goodbye causes a change of heart, and after chasing him to the airport and declaring herself, Doug decides to stay. Bec is shocked to find out she is pregnant, but she is not sure if Matt or Doug is the father.

== DVD release ==
Winners & Losers - The Complete First Season
Set details	Special features	
22 episodes; 6-disc set; 1.78:1 aspect ratio; English (Dolby Digital 5.1); M (recommended for mature audiences: mature themes, sexual references, coarse language and drug references)	Behind the Scenes	
Release Dates
Region 1	Region 2	Region 4
—	11 June 2012	21 September 2011

== Reception ==
=== Critical response ===
A writer from The Advertiser said that the series was a success because the "creative force Bevan Lee" was behind it. Jim Schembri writing for The Sydney Morning Herald had praise for the "fresh, brightly coloured, high-end soap", labelling the characters as "some of the most engaging" on television. The Age's reviewer observed the series as having "powerful themes of friendship, karma and justice for the underdog", which were played with subtle tone unlike other shows. They added that the mixture of "lively characters" and comedy made for "an engaging hour of television". Other columnists from The Age criticised certain aspects of the series. Paul Kalina accused Winners & Losers of playing it safe by implementing similar elements which made Packed to the Rafters a successful show.

Bridget McManus came to the conclusion that the series had eventually lost the "edge" it once possessed and even began to resemble a "poor girl's Sex and the City". A fellow columnist from The Age had also drawn comparisons to the American drama. McManus continued by identifying the main problem as being that the "potentially interesting characters" not being used as much as the four female protagonists. She concluded that the quartet were tired stereotypes of "the virgin, the damned whore, God's policewoman and a clown." Writing for the Radio Times, Claire Webb commented that Winners & Losers was "hardly the most original plot", but added "Still, the sassy script rattles rib-ticklingly along, and it's easy to see why this Australian series proved so popular Down Under."

=== Ratings ===
The pilot episode of Winners & Losers averaged 1.7 million viewers. It was the number one show in the 16–39 and 25–54 demographics, helping to win the network the night with a 33.6 per cent share. Seven decided to air the second and third episodes back to back, securing the highest ratings for the night once again with averages of 1.7 and 1.5 million viewers. The series continued to fare well in the ratings over the following weeks, which prompted a reporter from The Advertiser to state "No doubt part of Winners & Losers' early success can be attributed to creative force Bevan Lee, also the drama whiz behind Rafters and one-time ratings hit Always Greener. However, the ratings for the seventh episode "Like a Virgin" revealed Winners & Losers had lost over four hundred thousand viewers since its debut. The episode averaged 1.2 million viewers. The commercial audience of the series also dropped from 37.6 to 33.5, but it remained one of the twelve most watched programs in Australia.

=== Accolades ===
During its first season, Winners & Losers and its cast were nominated for six awards. The series received a nomination for Best Television Program from the AACTA Television Awards, while Tom Wren earned a nomination for Best Male Performance. The actor was later nominated for Most Popular New Male Talent at the Logie Awards, while Winners & Losers gathered a nomination in the Most Popular Drama Series category. Actress Melissa Bergland won the Most Popular New Female Talent award, while also garnering a nomination for Most Outstanding New Talent.
