= Winners & Losers season 2 =

Season of television series

Winners & Losers
- Season 2
- DVD cover art
- No. of episodes: 22

Release
- Original network: Seven Network
- Original release: 26 June – 27 November 2012

Season chronology
- ← Previous; Season 1 Next → Season 3

The second season of the television drama series Winners & Losers aired from 26 June to 27 November 2012 on the Seven Network in Australia. It replaced Packed to the Rafters while the series was on hiatus. Season two follows the lives of Jenny, Bec, Sophie and Frances three months on from the events of the first season. Filming for the season began in August 2011 and creator of the show, Bevan Lee stated that viewers would see big changes for the girls. The main cast members all returned, while Anne Phelan joined them as Gross family matriarch Nanna Dot.

== Production ==
On 5 July 2011, it was announced that Seven had renewed Winners & Losers for a second season to air in 2012. Filming for the second season began on 23 August 2011 and completed on 5 April 2012. Bevan Lee, the creator of Winners & Losers, told the Herald Sun's Colin Vickery that viewers would see big changes in the new season. He said "We turn the girls' lives on their heads in a pretty major way in the final episode (of series one). That will give us a new launching pad for season two." Zoe Tuckwell-Smith told a TV Week reporter that the new season would see the girls get different individual storylines. Tuckwell-Smith added that she had filmed limited scenes with Melissa Bergland, who plays Bec's best friend, Jenny. Of her character's journey, Bergland revealed "Jenny is falling in love and getting everything she ever wanted ... and then ruining her life! She's doing everything in two years that everyone else has done over 10. She's 28 next season, and she's catching up." The actress commented that Winners & Losers felt like it had grown up a bit. The season began airing on 26 June 2012 in the 8:30 pm timeslot on Tuesdays.

== Cast ==
=== Main ===
- Melissa Bergland as Jenny Gross
- Virginia Gay as Frances James
- Zoe Tuckwell-Smith as Bec O'Connor
- Melanie Vallejo as Sophie Wong
- Damien Bodie as Jonathan Kurtiss (20 episodes)
- Blair McDonough as Matt O'Connor
- Stephen Phillips as Zach Armstrong (19 episodes)
- Tom Wren as Doug Graham
- Denise Scott as Trish Gross
- Francis Greenslade as Brian Gross
- Sarah Grace as Bridget Fitzpatrick (16 episodes)
- Jack Pearson as Patrick Gross
- Tom Hobbs as Flynn Johnson (7 episodes)

=== Recurring ===
- Anne Phelan as Dot Gross (17 episodes)
- PiaGrace Moon as Jasmine Patterson (16 episodes)
- Paul Moore as Wes Fitzpatrick (15 episodes)
- Mike Smith as Callum Gilbert (12 episodes)
- Michala Banas as Tiffany Turner (11 episodes)
- Nick Simpson-Deeks as Rhys Mitchell (10 episodes)
- Peta Sergeant as Cat Johnson (8 episodes)
- Nell Feeney as Carolyn Gilbert (6 episodes)
- Carmen Duncan as Prof. Kerry Green (6 episodes)
- Luke Arnold as Lachie Clarke (6 episodes)
- Matt Levett as Spencer Campbell (5 episodes)
- Andrew Blackman as Tom Shields (5 episodes)
- Lara Robinson as Tilly Young (5 episodes)

=== Guest ===
- Natalie Saleeba as Claire Armstrong (4 episodes)
- Thomas Lacey as Ollie Masters (4 episodes)
- Greg Stone as Steve Gilbert (3 episodes)
- Julie Forsyth as Marjorie Felton (3 episodes)
- Brett Cousins as Glenn Young (3 episodes)
- Katherine Hicks as Sam MacKenzie (3 episodes)
- Maya Aleksandra as Brandi Bower (2 episodes)
- Luke Hemsworth as Jackson Norton (2 episodes)
- Carolyn Bock as Louise Wong (2 episodes)
- Lawrence Mooney as Trevor Myers (1 episode)
- Judith McGrath as Maria Crawley (1 episode)
- Julie Nihill as Pauline Brown (1 episode)
- Ross Thompson as Keith Boland (1 episode)
- Peter Houghton as Max Masters (1 episode)
- Ben Anderson as Terry Carlisle (1 episode)

==== Casting ====
Returning supporting cast members included Michala Banas as Tiffany Turner, PiaGrace Moon as Jasmine Patterson, Natalie Saleeba as Claire Armstrong, Mike Smith as Bec's brother Callum Gilbert and Nell Feeney as their mother Carolyn Gilbert. Nick Simpson-Deeks reprised his role as Rhys Mitchell for ten episodes.

In April 2012, Erin McWhirter of TV Week announced Luke Hemsworth would be appearing in at least two episodes. On 7 July 2012, a writer for The Advertiser revealed that Maya Aleksandra had joined the guest cast as Brandi Bower, a character who is engaged to Steve Gilbert (Greg Stone). Luke Arnold was cast as Lachie, Jenny's university friend, while Lara Robinson appeared in five episodes as student Tilly Young. Peta Sergeant started appearing as Sophie's friend, Cat Johnson, from August. Tom Hobbs also joined the main cast as Cat's brother Flynn. Brett Cousins began appearing from October 2012 as Tilly's father, Glenn.

== Episodes ==
No. overall	No. in season	Title	Directed by	Written by	Original release date	Australian viewers
23	1	"The Happily Ever After Thing"	Nicholas Bufalo	David Hannam	26 June 2012	1.223
It has been 16 weeks since Bec's wedding and life is changing for all the women in many different ways. Bec is trying to deal with the awkward situation surrounding her pregnancy whilst a rivalry bubbles away between Matt and Doug. Jenny finds herself in a sticky situation when Bridget and Wes ask for another $10,000 whilst bidding for a house. Frances and Zach's sex life has diminished over the time due to Jasmine's arrival. Sophie takes her re-entrance examination and surprises Doug with the news.
24	2	"Grape Expectations"	Nicholas Bufalo	Kirsty Fisher	3 July 2012	1.161
Jenny organises a weekend away for the four couples in an attempt to hide her financial woes, but is pleasantly surprised when the girls support her problems. Bec worries about Matt and Doug after the former catches the latter with Bec sharing the baby's first movement. Frances and Zach continue to have trouble with their sex life. Sophie learns that she passed her medicine re-entrance examination and celebrates. Jasmine temporarily stays at the Gross house and flirts with Patrick after she is arrested for planking. Nana Dot arrives and immediately begins annoying Trish.
25	3	"Welcome to the Family"	Ian Gilmour	Alix Beane	10 July 2012	1.246
Bec and Callum are both horrified when they believe their parents are getting back together, but they are in for a shock when Steve turns up with his 28-year-old fiancée Brandi. Sophie's first day on emergency rotation turns into a catastrophe when she finds herself in a medical emergency, having to make a rash decision which ends in her having to front the hospital board. Jenny's first day at university brings back memories of high school but she meets Lachie, a young, quirky musician and they hit it off. Frances is worried when Claire turns up on her doorstep making an out-of-the-blue apology.
26	4	"Juggling's Not Just a Party Trick"	Ian Gilmour	Trent Roberts	17 July 2012	1.159
Bec attempts to juggle her job, her pregnancy and her father's upcoming wedding. Things are not helped when she catches Brandi kissing Matt. Mr Gross' redundancy impacts on Jenny and Frances' friendship. When Jenny feels bad about spending all of her money, she decides to manage Lachie's band. Sophie tries to take her mind off her upcoming hearing with the hospital board and Jonathan runs into Chris and his new girlfriend.
27	5	"A Day in the Life"	Bill Hughes	Faith McKinnon	24 July 2012	1.026
Jenny's commitment to managing Nana Kiss causes her to neglect Callum and the girls. Lachie tells Jenny that he has feelings for her. Frances slaps Jasmine after she is brought back by the police again. Jasmine runs away, but Claire talks her into being the bigger person. Bec and Doug attend an antenatal class, while Sophie tries to redeem herself at the hospital.
28	6	"Twists of Fête"	Bill Hughes	Phil Lloyd	31 July 2012	0.843
Bec decides she wants a homebirth, but Matt and Doug disagree with the idea. Frances feels guilty after slapping Jasmine and it starts to affect her relationship with Zach. Jasmine then pushes him to breaking point. A visit to Mystic Marg makes Jenny realise that Callum is not her true love, and she and Lachie grow closer. Spencer digs further into Sophie's background and stolen hospital drugs are later discovered in her bag.
29	7	"What Lies Beneath"	Steve Jodrell	Sandy Webster	7 August 2012	0.845
Jenny feels guilty for having sex with Lachie, especially when Callum tries to cheer her up. Frances and Zach get a generous offer from Simone and Trevor, but discover Claire had something to do with it. Bec runs into Tiffany Turner, who reveals that she is dating a property developer called Tom. Sophie wants Spencer to pay and confronts him about planting the drugs in her bag.
30	8	"Letters and Lies"	Steve Jodrell	Dan Bennett	14 August 2012	1.104
Rhys returns and Jenny tells him about her infidelity with Lachie. He advises her to tell Callum the truth in a letter. Jenny decides not to give it to him when he proposes, but Callum still finds the letter. Bec and Matt start to suspect Tom is abusing Tiffany. Sophie's friend, Cat, returns from Kenya, throws a party and sleeps with Zach. It becomes apparent that Cat is hiding something from Sophie. Frances finds it hard to work with Zach, so he buys her out of their business.
31	9	"Stalled"	Nicholas Bufalo	Pete McTighe	21 August 2012	1.348
Frances struggles without Compose and a plan for the future. She later befriends Cat and forgives her for having sex with Zach. Influenced by Cat, Sophie decides she wants to go to Kenya, but her plans are grounded when Doug reveals his obligations towards the baby come first. Jenny struggles with the enormity of her betrayal, which has broken her friendship with Bec. Frances and Sophie try to help them, but Bec cannot face Jenny. However, an accident brings them back together.
32	10	"Moving On"	Nicholas Bufalo	Clare Atkins	21 August 2012	1.281
Frances goes speed dating with Cat, who reveals that she is pansexual and Frances' interest in her grows. Bec goes back to work and learns the truth about how Tiffany got her injuries. She then invites Tiffany to stay with her and Matt. Jenny puts off studying for her exams, as she believes she should not become a teacher. Sophie decides that she does not want to have children with Doug any time soon.
33	11	"Future Tense"	Ian Gilmour	David Hannam	28 August 2012	1.328
Jenny throws a baby shower for Bec and Bridget, where she comes face to face with Carolyn. Frances and Cat have a fight, but share a kiss when they make up. Tiffany finds out that her ex-husband is planning to take her children to Hong Kong. Sophie learns Doug has put in a good word for her at The Alfred, but wonders whether she should go to Kenya for the rest of her internship. Rhys decides to be more confident when it come to public affection.
34	12	"Maybe Baby"	Ian Gilmour	Kirsty Fisher	4 September 2012	1.434
Bec goes into labour and Sophie is forced to deliver her baby, while Doug and Matt hurry back from a fishing trip. Frances remains confused about the kiss she shared with Cat and later learns her friend is dying. Jenny worries about her teaching placement when she learns it will take place at Renwood Girls High. Bridget tries to kick start her labour.
35	13	"A Problem Shared"	Jean-Pierre Mignon	Trent Roberts	11 September 2012	1.303
Bec and Matt bring Harrison home from the hospital, but struggle to settle him at night. Bridget questions her abilities as a mother, when it seems her daughter, Aalivyah, likes Wes better than her. Jenny's stress about her teaching placement causes her to suffers hallucinations of Tiffany. Cat's condition becomes worse and Frances begs her to tell Sophie.
36	14	"The Right Time"	Jean-Pierre Mignon	Alix Beane	18 September 2012	1.326
Jenny runs into some problems at work when she befriends her students on Facebook. She and Patrick later enter Aalivyah into a baby photo competition after discovering the true extent of their parents' financial problems. Bec worries that Matt is going to start resenting their new situation. When Tiffany helps out at the salon, Bec offers her a job. Sophie is shocked when she learns of Cat's final plans. After making up with Frances, Cat takes her own life.
37	15	"Footprints"	Jet Wilkinson	Nicky Arnall	2 October 2012	1.194
The girls attend Cat's funeral, before Sophie and Frances are asked to join the reading of the will. Sophie is surprised when she learns Cat has left her entire estate to her. However Cat's brother, Flynn, contests the will. Bec realises that Matt and Harrison need to bond. After discovering that one of her students is being bullied, Jenny confronts Tiffany about why she bullied her. Taking Cat's advice to heart, Frances questions if she wants to become a lawyer again.
38	16	"A Whole New World"	Jet Wilkinson	Dan Bennett	9 October 2012	1.233
Jonathan and Rhys are attacked by a homophobic bouncer, which leads Frances to try to get justice for them. Sophie announces that she wants to go to Kenya for six months to oversee the building of Cat's clinic. Jenny worries that she has bullied Bridget and Wes into holding a christening for Aalivyah. Matt finds sympathy in Tiffany when he starts to feel alienated in his marriage, while Bec organises a surprise weekend away for their anniversary.
39	17	"Matters of the Heart"	Declan Eames	Dan Bennett	16 October 2012	1.269
After being set up on dates by Jonathan and Rhys, Jenny realises that she loves Callum. Tiffany asks Frances to represent her during her custody case. Sophie proposes to Doug who, after some initial hesitation, accepts. Bec is shocked to learn that Matt and Tiffany might have been having an affair, leaving her unable to work out what to believe. After winning her custody case, Tiffany agrees with Matt that there is something between them and they kiss.
40	18	"Eyes Wide Open"	Declan Eames	Sarah Hillman-Stolz	23 October 2012	1.280
Sophie has a panic attack while shopping for engagement rings and wonders if she is making a mistake. She later learns her parents have separated. Matt begins an affair with Tiffany, while Bec believes their relationship difficulties are over. When she finds a sketchbook for their ideal home, she tells Matt they should finally get started on it. Jenny spends time with Tilly and her father, Glenn. Frances is relieved when Zach states that he does not want to get married again.
41	19	"To Have & to Hold"	Pino Amenta	Pete McTighe	30 October 2012	1.264
Sophie gets nervous about the wedding after finding an old picture and calls off the engagement, however Doug agrees to try to make things go back to the way they were. Bec is oblivious to the fact that Matt has had an affair, while he confesses all to Sophie. Frances has to make the decision about Jasmine's love life being brought into her house. Jenny must find a way to move forward with her relationship, but it is not easy with Patrick interfering. Rhys asks Jonathan to marry him in front of all their friends.
42	20	"The Whole Truth"	Pino Amenta	Clare Atkins	6 November 2012	1.439
Bec discovers that $9000 is missing from her bank account and soon traces it back to her father. Jenny breaks up with Glenn after he reveals he still has feelings for his ex-wife. She is later surprised when Callum turns up on her doorstep. Following the end of their engagement, Sophie and Doug try to work through their problems. Later, a shock turn of events has Sophie worried. Frances and Jasmine deal with Ollie moving in permanently. Bridget witnesses a heated conversation between Dot and Sam, a young barmaid at the local bar.
43	21	"Perfect Match"	Kevin Carlin	Alix Beane	13 November 2012	1.316
Bec and Matt find the land that they want to build their dream house on, however the vendor pulls out of the deal at the last minute. Sophie discovers that she is pregnant and decides to have an abortion. She and Doug also decide to break up. Frances and Zach have to face a hard decision when he is offered a new job in Abu Dhabi. Callum decides to follow his heart and go after Jenny. When he sees her hugging Lachie, he kisses her and tells her the truth. Sam tells Dot that the Grosses have to know what is going on.
44	22	"This is Our Last Goodbye"	Kevin Carlin	Trent Roberts	27 November 2012	1.313
Rhys and Jonathan decide to get married, before he and Zach depart for Abu Dhabi. Sophie and Flynn decide to go to Kenya to scatter Cat's ashes and oversee the building of the clinic. Doug struggles with the break up, while Callum and Jenny get engaged. Frances wins her case against Jackson, the bouncer who attacked Jonathan and Rhys. The Gross family learn that Dot has been keeping the fact that Sam is Brian's daughter from them all. Jackson later holds Frances, Sophie and Jonathan hostage. Bec witnesses Matt blowing up in a gas explosion at the site of their new home. Final appearance of Blair McDonough as Matt O'Connor

== DVD release ==
Winners & Losers - The Complete Second Season
Set details	Special features	
22 episodes; 6-disc set; 1.78:1 aspect ratio; English (Dolby Digital 5.1); M (recommended for mature audiences: mature themes, sexual references and coarse language)	Behind the Scenes	
Release Dates
Region 1	Region 2	Region 4
—	11 June 2012	21 September 2011

== Critical reception ==
The season debut did not impress Gordon Farrer from WAtoday, who wrote "welcome to season two of Winners & Losers [...] the acting is patchy, too many of the characters are tinny and the moral is ham-fisted." While Holly Richards from The West Australian said that the storyline surrounding the characters of Sophie, Doug, Bec and Matt was an "awkward situation" and overall "the first episode promises some interesting conflict to come".

Ian Cuthbertson from The Australian said that season two is "still centred on four women, defined as losers at school, who win a motza on Oz Lotto". He called it "soap as usual" and questioned why something "interesting" was not done with their winnings, such a living abroad. While Debi Enker of The Age said that the biggest problem in the series was the "relentlessly ham-fisted style". They fail to be subtle because "every potential issue" is predictable and "everything is restated to the point that you want to scream at the screen". Enker added that they had "tweaked" characters and added "new elements" for season two, but it still lacked confidence. She concluded that Winners & Losers needed to remove the soap-style close-ups and "tone down the caricatured aspects of its characters".
