= Deeks =

Deeks is a surname. Notable people with the surname include:

- Barbara Ann Deeks (1937–2020), birth name of British actress Barbara Windsor
- Don Deeks (1923–1995), American footballer
- Florence Deeks (1864–1959), Canadian teacher and author
- John Deeks (born 1951), Australian television presenter

== Fictional characters ==
- Marty Deeks, a character in the television series NCIS: Los Angeles

== See also ==
- Nick Simpson-Deeks (born 1980), Australian actor
- Robert de Castella (born 1957), Australian marathon runner, nicknamed "Deeks"
