= Alice H. Parker =

American inventor

- Born: 1895; Morristown, New Jersey (?)
- Died: 1920 (aged 24–25)
- Occupation: Inventor
- Known for: Heating furnace

Alice H. Parker (1895 – 1920) was an African American inventor who was active in the early 1900s. She is known for her patent for a heating furnace using natural gas.

== Early life ==
Parker was born in 1895 in Morristown, New Jersey, where she grew up.

Parker attended Howard University Academy, a high school associated with Howard University, and was awarded a certificate with honors in 1910. According to census data, Parker was a cook in the kitchen in Morristown, New Jersey, and lived with her husband, a butler. Although the date of her death is unknown, it is thought she died in 1920 due to a fire or heat stroke.

In 2022, an investigation by Audrey Henderson of the Energy News Network found that photos commonly said to be of Parker were either of Bessie Blount Griffin (another inventor) or an Englishwoman of the same name.

== Innovative impact ==
Alice H. Parker, prior to graduating from Howard University, filed a patent for a special type of heating device around 1919. The system was unlike other furnace solutions at the time. The system provided a much safer way of generating heat instead of burning wood, and had air ducts allowing heat to spread throughout buildings the system was installed in. It also had the ability to control independently the temperature in different areas, a feature other systems lacked at the time. In terms of how the actual system worked, it consisted of a series of mini furnaces that were all connected to a common air exchanger. This exchanger would create hot air from the input of natural gas that would then be transported throughout the building, expelling heat throughout the entire building in a feasible manner.

In terms of the pain point she tried to address with this heating solution, she was solving the issue of the lack of heating efficiency associated with regular fireplaces at the time. Owners would have to manually find coal or stock up on wood to fuel their fires, which takes a lot of time and effort. Additionally, it’s not safe to keep a fire burning all night, forcing owners to consistently monitor the fire or only have it burning for a limited period.

The way her heating system used natural gas to distribute heat through ducts paved the way to HVAC technologies and forced-air systems seen today. Additionally, the way her invention allowed for making the temperatures in each room differently set the stage for temperature controls used in smart home systems, further highlighting how her invention influenced the development of residential heating systems.

Though her system left a positive impact on society by paving the way to modern heating systems, it was never implemented due to concerns with the regulation of heat flow, thus making it obsolete before it was ever used.

== Invention ==
At the time, gas central heating had yet to be developed, so people relied on burning coal or wood as their main source of heating.

Parker felt that the fireplace was not enough to keep her and her home warm during the cold New Jersey winter, and designed the first gas furnace that was powered by natural gas and the first heating system to contain individually controlled air ducts that distributed heat evenly throughout the building. Parker's heating system used independently controlled burner units that drew in cold air and conveyed the heat through a heat exchanger. This air was then fed into individual ducts to control the amount of heat in different areas. What made her invention unique, was that it was a form of "zone heating" where temperature can be moderated in different parts of a building.

The design poses health and safety risks as it made certain appliances like the oven more flammable and unsafe to touch. The regulation of the heat flow also posed a few security risks. Parker's invention also decreased the risk of house or building fires by eliminating the need to leave a burning fireplace on overnight. With her idea for a furnace used with modifications to eliminate safety concerns, it inspired and led the way to features such as thermostats, zone heating and forced air furnaces, which are common features of modern central heating. By using natural gas, it heated homes more efficiently than wood or coal counterparts (which were more time consuming and expensive). Parker's invention was further improved in 1935 by scientists who created forced convection wall heaters that use a coal furnace, electric fan, and ductwork throughout a home. Nowadays, homes utilize thermostats and forced air furnaces which can be attributed to Parker's design and invention of the central heating furnace. Parker’s invention added to the evolution of future Heating, ventilation, and air conditioning (HVAC) models. Other inventors prior to Parker invented furnaces, but she improved their designs.

== Legacy ==
In 2019, the National Society of Black Physicists honored Parker as an "African American inventor famous for her patented system of central heating using natural gas." It called her invention a "revolutionary idea" for the 1920s, "that conserved energy and paved the way for the central heating systems". The New Jersey Chamber of Commerce established the Alice H. Parker Women Leaders in Innovation Awards to honor women who use their "talent, hard work and ‘outside-the-box’ thinking to create economic opportunities and help make New Jersey a better place to live and work."

Parker’s patent for her gas furnace, although groundbreaking, was never chosen to enter full-fledged production and usage. This was mainly due to the safety concerns behind her design, as the technology available at the time did not possess the capability to regulate the heat flow as outlined in Parker’s invention. However, Parker’s patent has served as a basis for the development of heating systems throughout the 20th century and today. Parker’s design, which allows for an individual to control the heating received for each room in a house, is recognizable in the zonal heating system, and especially the “smart home” technology, that is used by nearly all households in the current century.

Parker’s legacy lives on numerous awards and grants, and most noticeably in the annual Alice H. Parker Women Leaders in Innovation Award that is given out by the New Jersey Chamber of Commerce to celebrate outstanding women innovators in Parker’s home state. However, the details regarding her later years are as unknown as the details available for her early life. The specific date for her death, along with the cause, is largely unknown with the information currently available.
