= Malham Wakin =

United States Air Force general (1931–2024)

- Born: March 31, 1931; Oneonta, New York, U.S.
- Died: July 30, 2024 (aged 93)
- Occupations: United States Air Force officer, Philosophy professor

Academic background
- Education: University of Southern California

Malham M. Wakin (March 31, 1931 – July 30, 2024) was a United States Air Force brigadier general, and head of the philosophy department at the U.S. Air Force Academy.

== Early life and education ==
Wakin was raised in Oneonta, New York. He graduated from the University of Notre Dame in 1952, earned an M.A. from the State University of New York, and earned a PhD at the University of Southern California in 1959.

== Military and teaching career ==
Wakin joined the U.S. Air Force in 1953, and spent 42 years on active duty. The great majority of those years were spent teaching at the Air Force Academy, beginning in 1959. He retired from active duty in 1995, but continued to teach at the academy until retiring from teaching in 2016.

One theme of Wakin's teaching career was challenging the assertion made by H. G. Wells in The Outline of History: "The professional military mind is by necessity an inferior and unimaginative mind; no man of high intellectual quality would willingly imprison his gifts in such a calling.".

== Death ==
Wakin died on July 30, 2024, at the age of 93.

== Works ==
Title	Year	Publisher	ISBN	Subject matter	Comments
The Viet Cong Infrastructure: Modus Operandi of Selected Political Cadres	1968	N/A	N/A	Viet Cong and PAVN strategy, organization and structure	Handbook written for the Department of Defense.
War, Morality, and the Military Profession	1979	Westview Press	ISBN 9780891586708	Military ethics	Cited as recommended reading by Marine General and U.S. Secretary of Defense James Mattis.
The Teaching of Ethics in the Military	1982	Institute of Society, Ethics, and the Life Sciences, The Hastings Center	ISBN 9780916558161	Military ethics	Written with Peter L. Stromberg and Daniel Callahan.
Integrity First: Reflections of a Military Philosopher	2000	Rowman & Littlefield	ISBN 9780739101704	Military ethics	
