= List of Winners & Losers episodes =

Winners & Losers logo

Winners & Losers is an Australian television drama that premiered on the Seven Network on 22 March 2011. The series aired for five seasons, and focuses on the fictional lives of a group of women, as they deal with everyday problems that arise in their lives. The show was created by Bevan Lee and developed by Sarah Walker. Dan Bennett and John Holmes serve as the script executive and executive producer, respectively. The series is produced by Paul Moloney, and formerly by MaryAnne Carroll.

Episodes are broadcast on Tuesday nights at 8:30 pm (or 9:30) Australian Eastern Standard Time (AEST). All episodes are approximately forty-three minutes, excluding commercials. The series is broadcast in 16:9 in standard definition. The first five seasons have been made available for viewing on Presto in Australia. Presto was discontinued in 2017.

== Series overview ==
Series	Episodes		Originally released	
Series	Episodes		First released	Last released
1	22		22 March 2011	23 August 2011
2	22		26 June 2012	27 November 2012
3	26	13	9 July 2013	25 September 2013
3	26	13	28 January 2014	24 June 2014
4	26	13	1 July 2014	23 September 2014
4	26	13	14 July 2015	8 September 2015
5	13		5 July 2016	12 September 2016

== Episodes ==
=== Season 1 (2011) ===
No. overall	No. in season	Title	Directed by	Written by	Original release date	Australian viewers
1	1	"Covert Aggression in Netball"	Nicholas Bufalo	Margaret Wilson and Bevan Lee	22 March 2011	1.726
2	2	"Those People in the Paper"	Nicholas Bufalo	Margaret Wilson and Bevan Lee	29 March 2011	1.700
3	3	"Reality Bites"	Steve Jodrell	Margaret Wilson	29 March 2011	1.544
4	4	"Worlds Collide"	Steve Jodrell	Dan Bennett	5 April 2011	1.522
5	5	"Fascinator Rhythm"	Ian Gilmour	Bevan Lee	12 April 2011	1.525
6	6	"Peace of the Past"	Ian Gilmour	Boaz Stark	19 April 2011	1.341
7	7	"Like a Virgin"	Nicholas Bufalo	Faith McKinnon	3 May 2011	1.385
8	8	"Secrets and Lies"	Nicholas Bufalo	Sandy Webster	10 May 2011	1.459
9	9	"One Door Opens"	Grant Brown	Phil Lloyd	17 May 2011	1.492
10	10	"Countdown"	Grant Brown	Faith McKinnon	24 May 2011	1.516
11	11	"Smelling the Roses"	Bill Hughes	Dan Bennett	31 May 2011	1.433
12	12	"Out of Left Field"	Bill Hughes	Trent Roberts	7 June 2011	1.472
13	13	"What Doesn't Kill You..."	Pino Amenta	Clare Atkins	14 June 2011	1.567
14	14	"Two Point Oh"	Pino Amenta	Leigh McGrath	21 June 2011	1.508
15	15	"Happiness is a Delusion"	San Davies	Kirsty Fisher	28 June 2011	1.451
16	16	"Dialling Up the Crazy"	San Davies	David Hannam	5 July 2011	1.408
17	17	"The Pink Dog"	Paul Moloney	Jo Martino	12 July 2011	1.412
18	18	"Mum's the Word"	Paul Moloney	Alix Beane	19 July 2011	1.424
19	19	"We Are Family"	Jet Wilkinson	Faith McKinnon	2 August 2011	1.465
20	20	"It's Written in the Stars"	Jet Wilkinson	Dan Bennett	9 August 2011	1.360
21	21	"Eat, Pray, Love"	Pino Amenta	Trent Roberts	16 August 2011	1.443
22	22	"Second Chances"	Pino Amenta	Dan Bennett	23 August 2011	1.433

=== Season 2 (2012) ===
No. overall	No. in season	Title	Directed by	Written by	Original release date	Australian viewers
23	1	"The Happily Ever After Thing"	Nicholas Bufalo	David Hannam	26 June 2012	1.223
24	2	"Grape Expectations"	Nicholas Bufalo	Kirsty Fisher	3 July 2012	1.161
25	3	"Welcome to the Family"	Ian Gilmour	Alix Beane	10 July 2012	1.246
26	4	"Juggling's Not Just a Party Trick"	Ian Gilmour	Trent Roberts	17 July 2012	1.159
27	5	"A Day in the Life"	Bill Hughes	Faith McKinnon	24 July 2012	1.026
28	6	"Twists of Fête"	Bill Hughes	Phil Lloyd	31 July 2012	0.843
29	7	"What Lies Beneath"	Steve Jodrell	Sandy Webster	7 August 2012	0.845
30	8	"Letters and Lies"	Steve Jodrell	Dan Bennett	14 August 2012	1.104
31	9	"Stalled"	Nicholas Bufalo	Pete McTighe	21 August 2012	1.348
32	10	"Moving On"	Nicholas Bufalo	Clare Atkins	21 August 2012	1.281
33	11	"Future Tense"	Ian Gilmour	David Hannam	28 August 2012	1.328
34	12	"Maybe Baby"	Ian Gilmour	Kirsty Fisher	4 September 2012	1.434
35	13	"A Problem Shared"	Jean-Pierre Mignon	Trent Roberts	11 September 2012	1.303
36	14	"The Right Time"	Jean-Pierre Mignon	Alix Beane	18 September 2012	1.326
37	15	"Footprints"	Jet Wilkinson	Nicky Arnall	2 October 2012	1.194
38	16	"A Whole New World"	Jet Wilkinson	Dan Bennett	9 October 2012	1.233
39	17	"Matters of the Heart"	Declan Eames	Dan Bennett	16 October 2012	1.269
40	18	"Eyes Wide Open"	Declan Eames	Sarah Hillman-Stolz	23 October 2012	1.280
41	19	"To Have & to Hold"	Pino Amenta	Pete McTighe	30 October 2012	1.264
42	20	"The Whole Truth"	Pino Amenta	Clare Atkins	6 November 2012	1.439
43	21	"Perfect Match"	Kevin Carlin	Alix Beane	13 November 2012	1.316
44	22	"This is Our Last Goodbye"	Kevin Carlin	Trent Roberts	27 November 2012	1.313

=== Season 3 (2013–14) ===
No. overall	No. in season	Title	Directed by	Written by	Original release date	Australian viewers
Part 1
45	1	"Whys & What Ifs"	Nicholas Bufalo	Trent Roberts	9 July 2013	0.991
46	2	"Head in the Sand"	Nicholas Bufalo	Alix Beane	16 July 2013	1.014
47	3	"Self Defence"	Declan Eames	Nicky Arnall	23 July 2013	1.005
48	4	"When You Least Expect It"	Declan Eames	Dan Bennett	30 July 2013	1.173
49	5	"In An Instant"	Pino Amenta	Dan Bennett	6 August 2013	1.154
50	6	"Blame It on the Moon"	Pino Amenta	Trent Roberts	13 August 2013	1.203
51	7	"I Shall Be Released"	Lucas Testro	Kirsty Fisher	20 August 2013	1.153
52	8	"Angle of Repose"	Lucas Testro	Nicky Arnall	27 August 2013	1.115
53	9	"You Can Run..."	Nicholas Bufalo	Alix Beane	3 September 2013	1.144
54	10	"How to Hide a Scar"	Nicholas Bufalo	Trent Roberts	10 September 2013	1.177
55	11	"Dirty Little Secrets"	Pino Amenta	Emma Gordon	17 September 2013	1.068
56	12	"Love's Labours Lost"	Pino Amenta	Art Benjamin, Rene Zandveld & Eloise Healey	24 September 2013	1.245
57	13	"It's a Nice Day to Start Again"	Jean-Pierre Mignon	Trent Roberts	25 September 2013	1.147
Part 2
58	14	"The Wake–Up Call"	Jean-Pierre Mignon	Pete McTighe	28 January 2014	1.159
59	15	"Slip Sliding Away"	Ian Gilmour	Rene Zandveld	4 February 2014	1.160
60	16	"The Real Me"	Ian Gilmour	Alix Beane	11 February 2014	1.084
61	17	"Afternoon Delight"	Fiona Banks	Nicky Arnall	18 February 2014	1.201
62	18	"Selective Reality"	Fiona Banks	Trent Roberts	25 February 2014	1.160
63	19	"Fallout"	Kevin Carlin	Pete McTighe	4 March 2014	1.084
64	20	"Time Waits for No One"	Kevin Carlin	Eloise Healey	11 March 2014	1.049
65	21	"The Right Wrong Choice"	Jet Wilkinson	Rene Zandveld & Eloise Healey	11 March 2014	0.929
66	22	"You Choose You Lose"	Jet Wilkinson	Emma Gordon	18 March 2014	1.117
67	23	"The Forbidden Fruit"	Ian Gilmour	Alix Beane	18 March 2014	1.030
68	24	"Coming to Terms"	Ian Gilmour	Rene Zandveld	17 June 2014	1.119
69	25	"All Good Things..."	Kevin Carlin	Trent Roberts	17 June 2014	1.000
70	26	"...Must Come to an End"	Kevin Carlin	Dan Bennett	24 June 2014	1.013

=== Season 4 (2014–15) ===
No. overall	No. in season	Title	Directed by	Written by	Original release date	Australian viewers
Part 1
71	1	"Two Out of Three Ain't Bad"	Pino Amenta	Emma Gordon	1 July 2014	1.097
72	2	"Shadow of a Doubt"	Pino Amenta	Eloise Healey	8 July 2014	1.005
73	3	"No Woman Is an Island"	Peter Carstairs	Kirsty Fisher	15 July 2014	1.101
74	4	"An Ass of You and Me"	Peter Carstairs	Trent Roberts	22 July 2014	1.044
75	5	"The Easy Way Out"	Jean-Pierre Mignon	Rene Zandveld	29 July 2014	0.911
76	6	"Ctrl-Alt-Delete"	Jean-Pierre Mignon	Emma Gordon	5 August 2014	1.012
77	7	"The New Me"	Pino Amenta	Nicky Arnall	12 August 2014	0.902
78	8	"Rock and a Hard Place"	Pino Amenta	Eloise Healey	19 August 2014	0.990
79	9	"Who Run the World?"	Ian Gilmour	Alix Beane	26 August 2014	1.003
80	10	"Terms and Conditions"	Ian Gilmour	Trent Roberts	2 September 2014	0.925
81	11	"So Long, Farewell"	Fiona Banks	Rene Zandveld	9 September 2014	0.879
82	12	"Same, Same, But Different"	Fiona Banks	Nicky Arnall	16 September 2014	0.966
83	13	"When You Least Expect It"	Pino Amenta	Eloise Healey	23 September 2014	1.041
Part 2
84	14	"The Great Unknown"	Pino Amenta	Alix Beane	14 July 2015	0.824
85	15	"This Is Your Life?"	Jean-Pierre Mignon	Shaun Topp	21 July 2015	0.749
86	16	"The Cold Light of Day"	Jean-Pierre Mignon	Rene Zandveld	28 July 2015	0.786
87	17	"What You Wish For"	Fiona Banks	Trent Roberts	28 July 2015	0.722
88	18	"Intervention"	Fiona Banks	Pete McTighe	4 August 2015	0.744
89	19	"Now the Rain Is Gone"	Kevin Carlin	Alix Beane	4 August 2015	0.734
90	20	"Lean on Me"	Kevin Carlin	Mithila Gupta	11 August 2015	0.781
91	21	"Proof of Identity"	John Hartley	Trent Roberts	11 August 2015	0.745
92	22	"Through the Looking Glass"	John Hartley	Nicky Arnall	18 August 2015	0.820
93	23	"Pride & Prejudice"	Nicholas Bufalo	Pete McTighe	18 August 2015	0.795
94	24	"Unfinished Business"	Nicholas Bufalo	Alix Beane	25 August 2015	0.828
95	25	"Surface Tension Theory"	Bill Hughes	Emma Gordon	1 September 2015	0.739
96	26	"Happy Endings"	Bill Hughes	Dan Bennett	8 September 2015	0.840

=== Season 5 (2016) ===
No. overall	No. in season	Title	Directed by	Written by	Original release date	Australian viewers
97	1	"Let the Right One In"	Fiona Banks	Emma Gordon	5 July 2016	0.697
98	2	"Ready Set Go"	Fiona Banks	Shaun Topp	12 July 2016	0.679
99	3	"NBF"	Nicholas Bufalo	Rene Zandveld	19 July 2016	0.705
100	4	"When the Wheels Come Off"	Nicholas Bufalo	Eloise Healey	19 July 2016	0.691
101	5	"Hook, Line & Sinker"	Jean-Pierre Mignon	Mithila Gupta	26 July 2016	0.601
102	6	"Caught in the Crossfire"	Jean-Pierre Mignon	Trent Roberts	26 July 2016	0.583
103	7	"Cold Hard Bitch"	Ian Gilmour	Nicky Arnall	2 August 2016	0.619
104	8	"No Going Back"	Ian Gilmour	Eloise Healey	2 August 2016	0.586
105	9	"The Woman in the Mirror"	Jet Wilkinson	Trent Roberts	23 August 2016	0.668
106	10	"Best Laid Plans"	Jet Wilkinson	Daniel O'Sullivan	30 August 2016	0.558
107	11	"Bloom"	Fiona Banks	Nicky Arnall	6 September 2016	0.609
108	12	"Ex Marks the Spot"	Fiona Banks	Shaun Topp	12 September 2016	0.667
109	13	"The Last Five Years"	Fiona Banks	Emma Gordon	12 September 2016	0.711

== Ratings ==
Winners & Losers : AUS viewers per episode (millions)

Season	Episode number																									
Season	1	2	3	4	5	6	7	8	9	10	11	12	13	14	15	16	17	18	19	20	21	22	23	24	25	26
1	1.726	1.700	1.544	1.522	1.525	1.341	1.385	1.459	1.492	1.516	1.433	1.472	1.567	1.508	1.451	1.408	1.412	1.424	1.465	1.360	1.443	1.433	–			
2	1.223	1.161	1.246	1.159	1.026	0.843	0.845	1.104	1.348	1.281	1.328	1.434	1.303	1.326	1.194	1.233	1.269	1.280	1.264	1.439	1.316	1.313	–			
3	0.991	1.014	1.005	1.173	1.154	1.203	1.153	1.115	1.144	1.177	1.068	1.245	1.147	1.159	1.160	1.084	1.201	1.160	1.084	1.049	0.929	1.117	1.030	1.119	1.000	1.013
4	1.097	1.005	1.101	1.044	0.911	1.012	0.902	0.990	1.003	0.925	0.879	0.966	1.041	0.824	0.749	0.786	0.722	0.744	0.734	0.781	0.745	0.820	0.795	0.828	0.739	0.840
5	0.697	0.679	0.705	0.691	0.601	0.583	0.619	0.586	0.668	0.558	0.609	0.667	0.711	–												

Source: Audience measurement performed by OzTam
