= Jonathan Kurtiss =

- Winners & Losers character
- First appearance: "Covert Aggression in Netball"; 22 March 2011
- Last appearance: "...Must Come to an End"; 24 June 2014
- Created by: Bevan Lee
- Portrayed by: Damien Bodie

In-universe information
- Occupation: Personal assistant
- Spouse: Rhys Mitchell (2012–)
- Significant other: Chris Jones

Jonathan Kurtiss is a fictional character in the Australian Channel Seven drama series Winners & Losers, played by Damien Bodie. Jonathan made his debut screen appearance in the pilot episode "Covert Aggression in Netball", broadcast on 22 March 2011. Bodie secured the role while working in the United States and returned to Melbourne to play Jonathan.

Jonathan is based on the show creator Bevan Lee. He is characterised as a caring, stylish and doting friend. Bodie would often implement his own ideas while filming the character. Jonathan is a gay character and has relationships with Chris Jones (Lachlan Woods) and Rhys Mitchell (Nick Simpson-Deeks). But it is his long-term friendship with Frances James (Virginia Gay) that fills most of his screen time. Originally centric to other character's storylines, the show developed the character during the show's second season. His story found him battling public perceptions of homosexuality and homophobia. Other storylines for the character include his break-up with Chris, romantic life with Rhys and their subsequent wedding. Bodie was delighted that the Seven Network supported his character's gay wedding plot.

The character has polarised critics due to his homosexuality. Columnists from The Age often criticised the character. Frances Atkinson named him a cliched role, Melinda Houston thought he was the show's only "irritant" and Jim Schembri accused him of being a "critic-baiting" character. But Debi Enker believed writers had toned the character's flamboyancy down. Anthony D. Langford of TheBacklot.com became an avid supporter of Jonathan and Rhys' storyline. While viewer opinion has been positive. TV Week's Erin McWhirter stated that his persona delighted viewers and Matt Akersten of Samesame.com.au noted heightened viewer support for his storyline with Rhys.

== Development ==
=== Creation and casting ===
Bodie had previously worked with Winners and Losers producer Maryanne Carroll on a show titled Short Cuts. She remembered his work and helped him secure the role. He sent the self-test footage over to the casting department in Australia. Bodie was in the United States at the time he auditioned. He was required to carry out to further auditions before being officially cast. Bodie returned to Australia and branded Jonathan his dream role. Bodie's casting in the show was publicised in tabloid media ahead of the series premiere. In a press release Bodie stated "I've never hit that prime time slot before, this is an exciting point in my career, something I've never done before."

=== Characterisation ===
"He’s a genuinely nice guy - albeit a little shallow at times - but if anything’s going to get him upset and emotional, it’s one of his friends or family getting hurt."

— A writer from Yahoo!7 on Jonathan. (2011)

Jonathan is a country boy originally from the Dandenongs. He was raised in an accepting and supportive family consisting of an "intelligent mother and gentle vintner Dad". Bodie has stated that the character is based on show on creator Bevan Lee and he wrote many of the character's "one-liners". The characters qualities are a caring nature and being a good friend. Bodie told Erin McWhirter from TV Week that his character loves his best friend Frances James (Virginia Gay) dearly and added "he's always carefree and enjoying himself." He added that viewers had approached him wanting to hire an assistant like Jonathan. A writer from the official Winners & Losers website described him as "born to be helpful, efficient, bossy and well - right." He has a stylish fashion sense, loves good food and wine and knows the best people and venues around Melbourne. His has charming and erudite persona and a "super efficient assistant" who is always well dressed in a business suit.

Jonathan is an openly gay man. But he is not overly camp or effeminate. He is well spoken but can unleash his sharp wit on others. Bodie was often asked by fans about his own sexuality. The actor took it as a compliment because he felt like he portrayed Jonathan's homosexuality in an accurate manner. Bodie had to tone down his own "over-the-top" personality while playing Jonathan. He liked to add his own ideas into the characterisation but during filming directors often refused. Bodie quipped that he did not do the role justice unless directors told no more than times. Bodie said that he has a similar energy to Jonathan who is always trying to cheer the other characters up. He said that he likes to play such characters because you can be more creative. He added that Jonathan often gets to play out the show's comic relief because he is not "necessarily straight laced, boring or the lead [character]."

=== Friendship with Frances James ===
Jonathan shares a close friendship with Frances. Bodie told a reporter from Yahoo!7 that Jonathan adores Frances for who she is. As her personal assistant he not only helps to take charge of her work life but her personal life too. Bodie enjoyed working with Gay on Jonathan and Frances' friendship. He found their scenes "creative, playful and fresh." He stated that his character's entire existence on the show hinged on the chemistry he and Gay shared. Bodie added that "the favourite aspect of playing my character is that with every day I get to explore, invest, create and delight in each scene trying to make Frances ease up on the heartburn." Jonathan finds Frances hilarious but he constantly worries about her emotions which he believes to be damaged. He understands her and realises that she can handle businessmen but is unable to deal with romance. He serves to help her out in romantic situations. Gay has stated that Jonathan is so important to Frances because he is her complete opposite. She described him as "impulsive, ridiculous, socially canny, he's the yin to her yang."

=== Relationships ===
The character was originally partnered with Chris Jones (Lachlan Woods), who unlike Jonathan was from an unaccepting family and did not dare disclose his relationship with Jonathan. This element makes Jonathan feel lucky to be loved by those closest to him. Chris ultimately ends their relationship. TV Week's Erin Miller reported that Jonathan would see Chris while on a night out with Sophie Wong (Melanie Vallejo). But Chris reveals that he is now straight and introduces them to his girlfriend. Miller added that the revelation would be a "shocking blow" for Jonathan.

Bodie revealed that Jonathan's personal life would be explored more during the show's second season. Jonathan begins a relationship with Rhys Mitchell (Nick Simpson-Deeks). But this is awkward because Rhys' coming out had broken his former girlfriend, Jenny Gross' (Melissa Bergland) heart and she is also friends with Jonathan. The pair face further problems when Rhys cannot embrace Jonathan's public displays of affection because he feels awkward about society's reaction. The show invested more time in their relationship towards the season two finale. When Jonathan helps to plan Sophie and Doug Graham's (Tom Wren) wedding he discusses his own thoughts on marriage. Rhys is inspired by Jonathan's views and proposes to him. The pair marry surrounded by their friends. But their ceremony is deemed illegal under Australian law. Bodie explained to Miller that Rhys is leaving to work overseas with Zach Armstrong (Stephen Phillips). The pair love each other so should make it official. He branded their ceremony "sweet" and was proud to be involved in a gay wedding storyline. He added "I was glad Channel Seven was glad to back the topic - it was beautifully written." Following Rhys' departure the duo's relationship was played out off-screen.

Don Groves from If Magazine reported that Bodie had signed with management in the United States and planned to take his career there. Jonathan departed the show during the third season finale. The episode featured the departures of various regular characters. Rhys was briefly written back into the series with a surprise visit for Jonathan. His final scenes saw him leaving to live in San Francisco with Rhys.

== Reception ==
TV Week's McWhirter said that Jonathan had delighted viewers as the "happy-go-lucky assistant". Tim Hunter (gaynewsnetwork.com.au) branded him a "likeable but stereotypical gay man" but originally "fairly one-dimensional, more of a caricature or cipher than a real character". But they praised his character development during the second season and believing that he had transformed into a "fleshed out" character. Hunter applauded the exploration of public displays of affection and homophobia. Matt Akersten of Samesame.com.au named Rhys' proposal of marriage a "very cute marriage proposal scene" and that viewers reacted positively to the storyline. Clem Bastow from The Vine criticised the character stating "the less said about Frances' snappy gay offsider Jonathan the better. At least Anthony and Stanford on SATC had inner lives beyond their hysterical one-liners."

Melinda Houston (The Sunday Age) said that Jonathan was one of the only ongoing gay roles on Australian television. Debi Enker from The Age believed that the show "dialled down the camp flamboyance of a cliched gay BFF" in season two. Their colleague Frances Atkinson branded it a "somewhat cliched role". But Melinda Houston was not impressed with "the camp, promiscuous sidekick with an eagle eye for fashion". She questioned whether all gay men behaved like Jonathan and branded him the show's only "irritant". While Jim Schembri branded him a "critic-baiting" character.

Anthony D. Langford writing for TheBacklot.com bemoaned Jonathan and Rhys' lack of storyline presence. He felt that the characters were not given the screen-time to fully explore the issue of them moving in together. He was angry that Jonathan considered moving away with Rhys because he believed that they were moving to fast. Langford later stated that he thought fictional gay romances were often unrealistically rushed on-screen. But he decided that Jonathan and Rhys were an exception, that he loved and fan worshipped them. In 2014, Langford criticised Jonathan and Rhys' departure. He added that Jonathan only ever served as "Frances' BFF" and said his romance took place mostly off-screen.
