= Mike Walsh Fellowships =

The Mike Walsh Fellowships have been established by Mike Walsh, a former television presenter and theatre producer, for students/graduates in the arts and entertainment industry to enhance their experiences in Australia and overseas.

== History ==
The Fellowships began in 1996 and were limited to applicants from the National Institute of Dramatic Art (NIDA) as Sydney was where Walsh's business interests were. As his business interests grew further afield the applicants for Fellowships eligibility was widened to include of the Western Australian Academy of Performing Arts (WAPPA) and the Victorian College of the Arts (VCA).

It is Walsh's view that,

... recipients of his fellowship may choose to travel abroad in order to obtain a wider knowledge and experience of theatre, perhaps through a formal course of study or by a self-devised program … to get out of your comfort zone is very important.

His hope is that the Fellows will come back to share their knowledge and skills with others. The scholarship is offered annually to an unspecified number of people. Erin James in Aussie Theatre wrote that,

Mike Walsh is one of the Australian Arts Industry’s most valuable members ... Walsh is committed to strengthening our industry in any way he can ... The Mike Walsh Fellowships to assist young theatre artists who have the potential to make a significant contribution to the Australian arts and entertainment industry.

== VCA & WAAPA ==
The Victorian College of the Arts is a faculty of the University of Melbourne which offers degrees in creative disciplines. This includes acting, dance, music theatre, production and writing. In 2011 the eligibility rules changed and students from VCA were able to apply for a fellowship. These changes also applied to students from the Western Australian Academy of Performing Arts whose graduates Walsh had seen and been impressed by, in many of the musical productions staged at his theatre, Her Majesty’s Theatre in Melbourne.

== Recipients ==
In the first 20 years of the award there have been over 90 recipients. Several have gone on to have Australian and International success. These include Jamie Jackson (1998), Joshua Lawson (2003), Brendan Moffitt (2007), Michael Agosta (2009), Trent Suidgeest and Alexandra Flood (2014)

Recipients are able to use the fellowship in any manner which increases their knowledge and experience. Claire Lovering (acting, WAAPA) a 2015 recipient from WAAPA received $8000 which she used for, "flights, course fees and accommodation for a five-week Chekhov Intensive Summer Course at the Stella Adler Studio of Acting in New York."

2004 recipient Nicholas Brown (costume)," travelled to India, Los Angeles, New York, London, Paris and Rome studying multiculturalism in theatre, film and television."

Nick Simpson-Deeks (acting) 2006 fellow undertook "a full time course of study at the Steppenwolf Theatre Company in Chicago; and Vincent Hooper."

2011 recipient Naomi Edwards (directing) used the fellowship combined with another fellowship "to visit arts organisations in England, Scotland, Japan and USA to research their education and engagement programs."

== List of recipients ==
The recipients of the Fellowships show the many disciplines which have been awarded Fellowships.

Year	Recipient
1996 Fellows	Jeanette Cronin (Acting)
1996 Associate Fellows	Dan Potra (Design)
1997 Fellows	Peter England (Design); Graeme Haddon (TP, Puppetry)
1998 Fellows	Genevieve Blanchett (Design); Janet Robertson (Movement Studies)
1998 Associate Fellows	Jamie Jackson (Acting)
1999 Fellows	Justin Kurzel (Design); Gavin Robins (Movement Studies)
1999 Associate Fellows	Patrick Nolan (Directing); Drayton Morley (Acting)
2000 Fellows	Michael Wilkinson (Design); Mark Truebridge (TP)
2000 Associate Fellows	Andy Biziorek (Directing)
2000 Special Grant	John King (Design)
2001 Fellows	Traleen Ryan (PC (Properties)); Matthew Andrews (TP); Bruce McKinven (Design)
2002 Fellows	Gordon Burns (Design); Damien Cooper (TP); Helen Dallimore (Acting)
2003 Fellows	Anthony Weigh (Acting); Kerry Goodrich (Acting); Joshua Lawson (Acting)
2003 Special Grant	Samantha Chester (Movement Studies); Judith Maschke (PC (Costume)
2004 Fellows	Saskia Smith (Acting); Nicholas Brown (PC (Costume); Gavan Swift (TP)
2005 Fellows	Ansuya Nathan (Acting); Jason Gibaud (PC (Costume)); Dorotka Sapinska (Design)
2005 Special Grant	Kate Goodhind (TP)
2006 Fellows	Sophie Buttner (PC Properties); Nick Simpson-Deeks (Acting)
2006 Associate Fellows	Jes Chantery (Acting)
2006 Special Grant	Clarence Dany (Directing)
2007 Fellows	Brendan Moffitt (Directing); John Sheedy (Directing)
2007 Associate Fellows	Jaime Meers (Directing)
2007 Special Grant	Troy Armstrong (Design); Jeremy Brennan (Acting)
2008 Fellows	James Mitchell (Acting)
2008 Associate Fellows	Ben Borgia (Acting); Adriano Cappelletta (Acting); Holly Austin (Acting)
2008 Special Grant	Tanya Goldberg (Acting)
2009 Associate Fellows	Dorje Swallow (Acting); Pearl Tan (Acting); Tom Campbell (Acting)
2009 Special Grant	Michael Agosta (Design); Bradley Clark (Design); Alexandra Sommer (Design); Anna Houston (Acting); Jamie Irvine (Acting)
2010 Fellows	Corinne Heskett (PC (Costume)); Shannon Murphy (Directing); Matthew Walker (Acting)
2010 Special Grant	Joseph Au (Scenery Construction); Peta Sergeant (Acting)
2011 Fellows	Jennifer Ellis (Puppetry VCA); Shane Jones (Directing NIDA); Tim Walter (Acting WAAPA); Stephen Wheat (Music Theatre WAAPA); Naomi Edwards (Directing VCA); Ailsa Paterson (Design NIDA); Tirion Rodwell (PC/Costume NIDA)
2012 Fellows	Gary Abrahams (Directing VCA); Verity Hampson (Lighting Design NIDA); Garth Holcombe (Acting NIDA); Catherine Terracini (Acting NIDA); Alice Ansara (Acting WAAPA); Grant Cartwright (Acting VCA); James Elliott (Acting NIDA)
2013 Fellows	Michelle Lim Davidson (Acting WAAPA); Ben Gerrard (Directing NIDA); Sarah Giles (Acting NIDA); Douglas Hansell (Acting WAAPA); Sheridan Harbridge (Staging for Performance NIDA); Dominic Seeber (Acting WAAPA); Nikki Shiels (Acting VCA); Kip Williams (Directing NIDA)
2014 Fellows	Matt Backer (Acting NIDA; Bridget Balodis (Directing VCA); Briallen Clarke (Acting NIDA); Alexandra Flood (Voice - Opera VCA); Edward Grey (Music Theatre WAAPA); Will Jensen (Producing NIDA); Trent Suidgeest (Lighting Design)
2015 Fellows	Clair Lovering (Acting WAAPA); Anthony Taufa (Acting NIDA); Christiana Aloneftis (Opera VCA); Michael Hankin (Design NIDA)
2015 Associate Fellows	Nicola Gunn (Performing VCA); Matt Furlani (Acting VCA); Mark Pritchard (Drematurgy VCA); Adam McGowan (Design NIDA)
2016 Fellows	Darcy Brown (Acting NIDA); Dan Giovannoni (Drematurgy NIDA); Nicholas Hiatt (Acting NIDA); Marcus McKenzie (Acting VCA); Felicity Nicol (Directing NIDA); Paige Rattray (Directing NIDA); Brett Rogers (Acting NIDA)
2017 Fellows	Mel Dyer (Stage Management NIDA); Paull-Anthony Keightley (Opera WAAPA); Patrick McCarthy (Directing VCA); Owen Phillips (Design NIDA); Michael Sheasby (Acting NIDA)
2018 Fellows	Bradley Barrack (Producing); Charles Davis (Design); Todd Eichhorn (Stage Management); Duncan Ragg (Director); Benjamin Sheen (Director); Andrew Strano (Music Theatre)
2019 Fellows	Alexander Berlage (Director); Peter Blackburn (Director); Nate Edmonson (Sound Design); Shondelle Pratt (Director); Drew Wilson (Puppeteer)
2022 Fellows	Isaac Hayward (Conducting); Mark Hill (Acting); Jay James-Moody (Producing); Rob Mallett (Acting); Jess Newman (Composing for Music Theatre)
