= An Englishman Looks at the World =

1914 essay collection by H. G. Wells

- First edition
- Author: H. G. Wells
- Language: English
- Genre: Essays
- Publisher: Cassell & Co
- Publication date: 1914
- Publication place: United Kingdom
- Pages: 356

An Englishman Looks at the World is a 1914 essay collection by H. G. Wells containing journalistic pieces written between 1909 and 1914. The book consists of twenty-six pieces ranging from five to sixty-two pages in length. An American edition was published the same year by Harper and Brothers under the title Social Forces in England and America.

Wells organized the essays thematically, inserting a fanciful "synopsis" after the table of contents conveying his view that the book constituted an argument: "Blériot arrives and sets him thinking. (1) He flies, (2) and deduces certain consequences of cheap travel. (3) He considers the King, and speculates on the New Epoch; (4) he thinks Imperially, (5) and then, coming to details, about Labour, (6) Socialism, (7) and Modern Warfare. (8) He discourses on the Modern Novel, (9) and the Public Library; (10) criticises Chesterton, Belloc, (11) and Sir Thomas More, (12) and deals with the London Traffic Problem as a Socialist should. (13) He doubts the existence of Sociology, (14) discusses Divorce, (15) Schoolmasters, (16) Motherhood, (17) Doctors, (18) and Specialisation; (19) questions if there is a People, (20) and diagnoses the Political Disease of Our Times. (21) He then speculates upon the future of the American Population, (22) considers a possible set-back to civilisation, (23) the Ideal Citizen, (24) the still undeveloped possibilities of Science, (25), and—in the broadest spirit—the Human Adventure. (26)"

== Background ==
The journalistic production in An Englishman Looks at the World reflects Wells's turn from novel-writing to journalism, which began in the years before the outbreak of the Great War. He was more and more frequently invited to write articles for popular periodicals like the Daily Mail.

Included in the collection are an account of "My First Flight," a long essay entitled "The Great State" that prefigured many of the themes of The Outline of History, and a philosophical essay entitled "The So-Called Science of Sociology," arguing that sociology would never be a science because "counting, classification, measurement, the whole fabric of mathematics, is subjective and deceitful, and . . . the uniqueness of individuals is the objective truth."
