= A. B. McKillop =

Canadian scholar

Alexander Brian McKillop FRSC (born 1946), known as A. B. McKillop or Brian McKillop, is Distinguished Research Professor and former Chancellor's Professor and Chair of the history department (2005–2009) of Carleton University in Ottawa, Ontario, Canada.

McKillop was born in Winnipeg, Manitoba, and educated at the University of Manitoba (BA 1968, MA 1970) and Queen's University in Kingston, Ontario (PhD 1977). He was elected Fellow of the Royal Society of Canada in 2001.

A specialist in intellectual and cultural history, his books include:

- A Critical Spirit: The Thought of William Dawson LeSueur (1977)
- A Disciplined Intelligence: Critical Inquiry and Canadian Thought in the Victorian Era (1979)
- Contexts of Canada's Past: Selected Essays of W.L. Morton (1980)
- Contours of Canadian Thought (1987)
- Matters of Mind: The University in Ontario, 1791-1951 (1994)
- The Spinster and the Prophet: Florence Deeks, H.G. Wells, and the Mystery of the Purloined Past (2000).
- Pierre Berton: A Biography (2008)

The Spinster and the Prophet describes the court proceedings that resulted from accusations of plagiarism brought by Florence Deeks against H. G. Wells for his book The Outline of History. It won the Toronto Book Awards, the University of British Columbia's President's Medal for Biography, and the Crime Writers of Canada Arthur Ellis Award for "Best True Crime". The Spinster and the Prophet marked a change in McKillop's writings for publication. His previous books had been written as academic monographs, but this was his first attempt at writing in a popular narrative style, and he refers to its composition in an essay on Canadian historiography that he later wrote for a volume published by the University of Toronto in celebration of the Canadian historian Carl Berger. From his initial position of emotional detachment from his subject, he came to empathise strongly with Florence Deeks, and only later did he recognise that the death of his mother from lung cancer while he drafted the book had been an important factor in this. As McKillop puts it, "I wrote my book, I now understand, less as a practised historian or as a neophyte biographer, than as a grieving son..."

In the fall of 2008 McKillop released Pierre Berton: A Biography, a comprehensive examination of the life of the late historian and media celebrity, Pierre Berton. The book won the Donald Grant Creighton Award of the Ontario Historical Society for best biography or memoir. It appeared as a trade paperback in September 2010.
