= Florence Deeks =

Canadian teacher and writer (1864–1959)

Florence Amelia Deeks
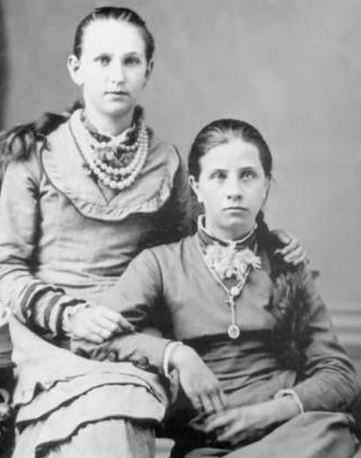
- Florence (right) with her sister Annie c. 1880
- Born: 4 September 1864; Morrisburg, Canada West
- Died: 17 June 1959 (aged 94); Toronto, Ontario.
- Occupations: Teacher, writer
- Known for: Legal battle with H. G. Wells

Florence Amelia Deeks (1864–1959) was a Canadian teacher and writer. She is known for accusing British writer H. G. Wells of having plagiarized her work when he wrote The Outline of History. The case was eventually taken to the Judicial Committee of the British Privy Council, the highest court of appeal in the British Empire, which rejected her claim.

== Early years ==
Florence Amelia Deeks was born in 1864 and grew up in Morrisburg, Canada West, in a religious family. Her mother, Melinda, was a strong believer in education. Her brother George found a new way to lay railway tracks, which enabled him to earn a fortune. He provided important financial support to his family, including Florence during the later legal trials. By her own account she spent most of her twenties travelling in Europe and America, studying literature and art. When Florence was thirty she was admitted to Victoria College in the University of Toronto. She studied there for several years, then became a teacher at the Presbyterian Ladies College.

Deeks probably joined the Women's Art Association of Canada in the mid-1890s, although the first record of her membership is from 1903. In 1912 she prepared a "historical sketch" of the early years of the association. She was active in other women's groups and was the recording secretary for the Toronto women's Liberal Club.

== Web of the World's Romance ==
Deeks decided to write a history of the world that showed the contributions that women had made. Her aim was to demonstrate the importance of women such as Lucrezia de' Medici, Elizabeth I of England and Margarethe, mother of Martin Luther. She spent four years researching and writing, with the support of her mother, sisters and brother. The manuscript of The Web of the World's Romance was complete by February 1918. Deeks submitted it to Macmillan Company in Canada, asking if they would object to her using extracts from A Short History of the English People, a book for which they held the copyright. Deeks entrusted the manuscript to Macmillan in August 1918, and it was returned to her in April 1919. The manuscript was well-thumbed and dog-eared. Macmillan had rejected it.

=== Legal struggles ===
Deeks later came across H. G. Wells' The Outline of History (published 1919–1920), and was struck by the similarities to her work, but she had no proof that Wells had seen her manuscript. Over the next few years she consulted with experts and analyzed the similarities. The Rev. William Andrew Irwin, then an associate professor of Old Testament Languages and Literature at the University of Toronto agreed to help her. He was interested in applying the same methods of textual analysis and comparison he used in his studies of ancient literature. He considered that there was convincing proof of plagiarism.

Deeks launched her suit in 1928. Deeks claimed breach of copyright, but in substance she was claiming breach of confidence in the use of her manuscript without consent. She sued Wells and Macmillan for damages of $500,000 in the Supreme Court of Ontario. The trial judge, Mr Justice Raney, found that Irwin's results were "fantastic hypotheses ... solemn nonsense ... comparisons without significance." Her case was dismissed. She then appealed to the Appellate Division of the Ontario Supreme Court, appearing on her own behalf without a lawyer. The Appellate Division unanimously dismissed the appeal.

Deeks finally appealed to the Judicial Committee of the Privy Council in London, the final court of appeal in the British Empire. She could no longer afford a lawyer, so argued her own case in front of the Judicial Committee on 1 October 1932. A month later, on 3 November 1932, the Judicial Committee dismissed her appeal. Lord Atkin gave the decision for the Committee. He stated that evidence presented on the basis of literary criticism is not admissible in a court of law, and upheld the decisions of the lower courts.

=== Assessment ===
Although the wording of the two books is rarely identical, in some cases the same mistakes appear in both books. However, it was sworn on oath at the trial that the manuscript remained in Toronto in the safekeeping of Macmillan, and that Wells did not even know it existed, let alone had seen it. The court found no proof of copying, and decided the similarities were due to the fact that the books had similar nature and both writers had access to the same sources.

The case may have been lost in part due to bias against Deeks as a woman. Deeks' lack of influential connections may also have been a factor. A 2001 book by A. B. McKillop, a Canadian historian, explores the case in detail. Although the author clearly believes that Wells plagiarized Deeks' work, he presents no definitive proof. Three years after McKillop's book appeared, Denis Magnusson, Professor Emeritus and former Dean of Law at Queen's University, Kingston, wrote an article responding to McKillop's thesis. Magnusson concluded that while Deeks may have received some discriminatory treatment from lawyers in the case, she was treated fairly by the courts. He concludes she had a weak case, and the courts would give a similar result if the case came forward at the present time.

== Death ==
Deeks died in 1959, aged 94.
