= Mr. Britling Sees It Through =

Book by Herbert George Wells

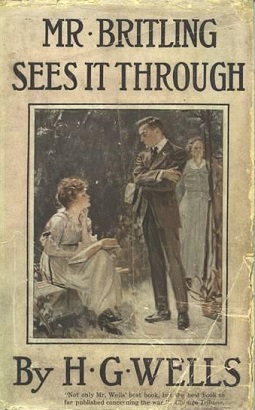
- First US edition
- Author: H. G. Wells
- Language: English
- Genre: Novel
- Publisher: Cassell (UK); Macmillan (US)
- Publication date: September 1916
- Publication place: England
- Media type: Print
- Pages: 443

Mr. Britling Sees It Through is H. G. Wells's "masterpiece of the wartime experience in south eastern England." The novel was published in September 1916.

Mr. Britling Sees It Through was one of the most popular novels in the United Kingdom and Australia during World War I. Wells's American publisher paid £20,000 for it. Maxim Gorky called the novel "the finest, most courageous, truthful, and humane book written in Europe in the course of this accursed war . . at a time of universal barbarism and cruelty, your book is an important and truly humane work."

== Synopsis ==
Mr. Britling Sees It Through tells the story of a renowned writer, Mr. Britling, a protagonist who is quite evidently an alter ego of the author. The garrulous, easy-going Mr. Britling lives with family and friends in the fictional village of Matching's Easy, located in the county of Essex, northeast of London. The novel is divided into three parts. Book the First, entitled "Matching's Easy at Ease," is set in June–July 1914 and is at first narrated from the point of view of an American, Mr. Direck, who visits Mr. Britling's establishment in Dower House and falls in love with Cissie, the sister of Mr. Britling's secretary's wife. Also in the company are Mr. Britling's son Hugh and a visiting German student, Herr Heinrich, who is forced to leave when war breaks out. Book the Second, "Matching's Easy at War," covers August 1914 to October 1915, when Mr. Britling's son Hugh is killed at the front. In Book the Third, "The Testament of Matching's Easy," Mr. Britling learns that Herr Heinrich has also been killed, and writes a long letter to the dead German soldier's parents.

== Thematic composition ==
Mr. Britling is a complex character whose conflicts are the chief concern of the plot. Mrs. Britling (Edith) runs the household, but she does not engage her husband's affections entirely. On the one hand, he is involved in "his eighth love affair" with a Mrs. Harrowdean (though this affair does not survive the beginning of the war). At a deeper level, he feels himself "profoundly incompatible" with Edith, his present wife, whom he married after the death of his first wife Mary, with whom he had been "passionately happy." His deep love of the son they had together, Hugh, is inflected by his continued emotional attachment to the memory of his first wife.

It is the obliviousness to Prussian militarism (through most of the novel, the First World War is blamed on this), and then the collective resolve of British society to confront it, that are the principal themes of Mr. Britling Sees It Through, but in the final pages the protagonist wins through to a larger, religious interpretation of the tragedy. Much of the first book is devoted to discussions of the character of British society, and much of the second and third to discussions of Britain's response to the challenge of the war. Mr. Britling is a critical but not radical observer of the national and international scene. He regards British life in general, for example, as an unplanned, organic development, and believes that the British Empire came into existence in a haphazard, unintentional manner.

Mr. Britling Sees It Through is of note for its extended exposition of Wells's non-sectarian religious faith: "Religion is the first thing and the last thing, and until a man has found God and been found by God, he begins at no beginning, he works to no end. He may have his friendships, his partial loyalties, his scraps of honour. But all these things fall into place and life falls into place only with God. Only with God. God, who fights through men against Blind Force and Night and Non-Existence; who is the end, who is the meaning." The novel was used as a text at chaplains' school, and was embraced by military officers and religious leaders.
