= New Jersey Chamber of Commerce =

The New Jersey Chamber of Commerce is an independent business advocacy organization based in Trenton. It represents the interests of many businesses and trade associations. It is not an agency of state or federal government.

In addition to lobbying on behalf of the business community at the New Jersey State House and in Washington, the Chamber provides members with networking events, educational programs and money-saving discounts. Its membership has long been broad-based, ranging from solo proprietors to Fortune 500 companies.

== Founding ==
In 1911, a group of New Jersey businessmen including Thomas Edison petitioned for the establishment of a state chamber of commerce. They considered governor Woodrow Wilson was pushing policies seen as antagonistic towards business, and were also spurred into action by the 1911 Supreme Court decision ordering a breakup of Standard Oil of New Jersey for contravening antitrust laws.

== "Walk to Washington" ==
Since 1937, the Chamber has sponsored an annual lobbying/business networking event called the "Walk to Washington," in which state business leaders and elected officials traveled together by chartered train (most recently on Amtrak) from Newark to Washington (with stops in New Brunswick, Metropark station (Iselin, Woodbridge Township), Trenton, Philadelphia, and Wilmington) to meet with the state's congressional delegation. During the journey, attendees could walk up and down the length of the train to personally meet with each other in what has been described as a "fraternity-house atmosphere." In response to complaints of inappropriate behavior on the train, the Chamber adopted a zero tolerance policy and banned hard alcohol in 2020. The "Walk to Washington" was suspended after the 2020 event due to the COVID-19 pandemic, but the Chamber has announced plans to resume the event in 2025.
