= Blair McDonough =

Australian actor

- Born: Blair McDonough; 30 April 1981 (age 45); Sydney, New South Wales, Australia
- Occupations: Stage and television actor
- Years active: 2000–present
- Spouse: Kristi Townley

Blair McDonough (born 30 April 1981), is an Australian actor who is best known for playing the role of Stuart Parker in the Australian TV soap opera Neighbours. He first shot to fame the age of 19 in 2001, when he finished runner-up in the inaugural season of the reality TV series Big Brother. He has since appeared on a number of other reality TV shows.

== Early life ==
McDonough is the youngest son of four boys, born to Kathy, an Irish mother. McDonough spent much of his childhood living in Singapore, where his parents were working, where he was educated at Tanglin Trust School and the United World College of South East Asia. In his mid-teens, he left Singapore and moved back to Australia with his family. They settled in the Melbourne suburb of Plenty. McDonough finished his schooling at Eltham College in Research. Blair and his brothers Wade, Gavin and Ryan were members of the band Snubrocket (later renamed Fifth Avenue), which was one of 30 that appeared in the music video clip for TISM's song "Thunderbirds Are Coming Out" in 1998. In 1999, Blair attended the National Youth Science Forum in Canberra.

== Career ==
In 2001, McDonough was a university student and semi-professional footballer, before he became a contestant in the first season of Big Brother Australia. He finished runner-up in the show, which generated a cult following.

A few months after Big Brother concluded, McDonough was cast in the long-running Australian soap opera Neighbours, in the role of Stuart Parker.

In 2002, McDonough was named one of the "25 Most Beautiful People" in the Australian publication Who.

In late 2005, McDonough announced he would be leaving Neighbours to seek work in London. He made his final appearance on Neighbours on 5 April 2006, in episode 4938, titled "Stu for the Road".

McDonough played the role of Dan in a West End play called The Vegemite Tales from July–October 2006, and again in July–October 2007. He has also appeared in a number of reality TV shows in the UK. He competed in soccer trials to represent a celebrity football team in Sky 1's The Match in October 2006. In January 2007, he appeared in BBC Two's Safari School, in which eight celebrities took part in a four-week ranger training course in the Shamwari Game Reserve in South Africa. He was the fourth celebrity to be eliminated. In April 2007, he appeared in ITV2's Deadline, in which various celebrities worked to create a celebrity-based magazine. He was the third celebrity to be sacked from the magazine. In 2008, he made an appearance as an Australian rules football player and murder victim in the television show City Homicide.

McDonough was cast as the new Steel in the Sapphire & Steel audio adventures produced by Big Finish Productions, beginning with Second Sight.

In 2008–9, McDonough appeared in the UK police drama Heartbeat as the character Mick MacDonald.

In 2009, McDonough appeared in the Australian Nine Network drama Sea Patrol in the semi-regular cast as the character Matt Robsenn.

McDonough signed on as a celebrity dancer in the 2010 season of Australia's Dancing with the Stars, but was the second person to be eliminated from the competition after receiving the fewest public votes on 11 July 2010. In preparation of the show, he appeared as a celebrity contestant on Deal or No Deal: Dancing with the Deals Double Shot edition and won $75,000 for his home viewer.

In April 2011, McDonough was cast in a starring role as Matt O'Connor in Seven Network's drama Winners & Losers. His character was killed off in a gas explosion in the season two final.

In April 2017, McDonough joined the cast of Home and Away in the guest role of Alan Ellis. The following year, he reprised his role of Stuart Parker in Neighbours for three episodes.

== Personal life ==
McDonough is married to Kristi Townley. The couple have two children.

== Filmography ==
Year	Title	Role	Notes
2001	Big Brother	Himself	Season 1
2001	Man Down	The Chad	Short film (credited as Blair)
2001–2006, 2018, 2022	Neighbours	Stuart Parker	Season 17 (guest), Seasons 18–22 (regular), Seasons 34, 38 (guest)
2007–2008	Heartbeat	Mick MacDonald	Seasons 17–18 (recurring, 4 episodes)
2008	City Homicide	Cameron Gunning	Season 2, Episode 7 – "Golden"
2009	Strangers on a Sushi Train	Hank	Short film
2009	Sea Patrol	Matt Robsen	Season 3 (recurring, 5 episodes)
2010	Sleuth 101	Dan Kinsman	Season 1, Episode 7 – "Performance Enhancing Death"
2011–2012	Winners & Losers	Matt O'Connor	Season 1–2 (regular, 22 episodes)
2017	Home and Away	Alan Ellis	Season 30 (recurring, 6 episodes)
2020	Mystery Road	Pat	Season 2 (recurring, 3 episodes)
2021	Young Rock	Assistant Coach #1	Season 1, Episode 8 – "My Baby Only Drinks the Good Stuff"
2022	Seriously Red	Tom	Feature film
TBA	Blood Sisters	Eddie	TV series (completed)
