= Damien Bodie =

Australian actor (born 1985)

- Born: 2 January 1985 (age 41); Melbourne, Victoria, Australia
- Education: Sandringham Secondary College
- Occupation: Actor
- Years active: 1996–present
- Known for: Crash Zone; Neighbours; Winners & Losers

Damien Bodie (born 2 January 1985) is an Australian television actor from Melbourne, known for his roles as Ram Foley in Crash Zone, Dylan Timmins in Neighbours and Jonathan Kurtiss in Winners & Losers.

== Early life and education ==
Bodie was educated at Sandringham Secondary College in Melbourne, where he completed his VCE while performing in school stage productions. He has also studied and performed Improvisation Live at the Upright Citizens Brigade in Los Angeles.

== Career ==
Bodie first appeared on television aged seven, before securing a regular role in 1997, in children's series Ocean Girl, playing Louis Danton, a young member of ORCA's crew.

In 1999, Bodie began appearing as Ram Foley in the children's series Crash Zone and held the role for three years. In 2002, he played Oscar Coxon in the children's series Short Cuts, which aired on the Seven Network. That same year, he had a role as Josh in the 2002 Canadian-Australian television series Guinevere Jones and the following year he made a guest appearance in The Saddle Club. He also had a guest role in Blue Heelers in 2003.

In 2005, Bodie secured the regular role of Dylan Timmins in long-running soap opera Neighbours. He had previously made two appearances in the series, as Charlie Moyes in 1996 and Liam Rigby in 1999. That same year, he had a role in the 2005 Australian film Hating Alison Ashley, alongside Delta Goodrem and Saskia Burmeister.

In 2008, Bodie portrayed Vashan in the Australian children's television series The Elephant Princess. In 2010, he had a guest role in City Homicide and in the same year, he joined the cast of Seven Network’s Australian drama series, Winners & Losers, playing the ongoing role of Jonathan Kurtiss until 2014. Bodie had previously worked with Winners and Losers producer Maryanne Carroll on the show Short Cuts. She remembered his performance and helped him secure the role.

On 24 November 2019, Neighbours confirmed that Bodie had reprised the role of Dylan for the show's 35th anniversary in March 2020.

== Filmography ==
=== Film ===
Year	Title	Role	Notes
2005	Hating Alison Ashley	Damo	Film
2009	Welcome to the Cosmos	Dave	Film
2014	Dinner for Three	Archie	Short film
2015	A Kind of Magic	Alex	Film
2017	Born Guilty	Lee	Film

=== Television ===
Year	Title	Role	Notes
1996	Snowy River: The McGregor Saga	Dennis Andrews	Guest role
1996	Neighbours	Charlie Moyes	Guest role
1997	Ocean Girl	Louis Danton	Main role
1997	The Balanced Particle Freeway	Bede	TV movie
1999	Neighbours	Liam Rigby	Guest role
1999–2001	Crash Zone	Abraham 'Ram' Foley	Main role
2002	Marshall Law	Paul	Guest role
2002	Short Cuts	Oscar Coxon	Main role
2002	Guinevere Jones	Josh Meyers	Main role
2002	Bootleg	Frankie Crawley	Miniseries, guest role
2003	Blue Heelers	Lucas Moore	Guest role
2003	The Saddle Club	Raffael	Guest role
2004	Fergus McPhail	Leon	Guest role
2004	Salem's Lot	Goth Kid	Miniseries, guest role
2005–2007, 2020	Neighbours	Dylan Timmins	Main role
2008–2009	The Elephant Princess	Vashan	Season 1, main role
2010	City Homicide	Ben Corrigan	Guest role
2011–2014	Winners & Losers	Jonathan Kurtiss	Main role
2016	Scary Endings	Gregory	YouTube anthology series, guest role
