= Winners & Losers =

Australian television drama series (2011–2016)

- Created by: Bevan Lee
- Starring: Melissa Bergland; Virginia Gay; Melanie Vallejo; Zoe Tuckwell-Smith; Blair McDonough; Damien Bodie; Stephen Phillips; Denise Scott; Francis Greenslade; Sarah Grace; Jack Pearson; Tom Wren; Mike Smith; Tom Hobbs; Katherine Hicks; Sibylla Budd; Nick Russell; Nathin Butler; James Saunders; Laura Gordon; Demi Harman; Paul Moore
- Country of origin: Australia
- Original language: English
- No. of seasons: 5
- No. of episodes: 109 (list of episodes)

Production
- Executive producers: John Holmes; Julie McGauran
- Producers: MaryAnne Carroll (S1); Paul Moloney (S2–5)
- Production locations: Melbourne, Australia
- Running time: 44 minutes
- Production company: Seven Productions

Original release
- Network: Seven Network
- Release: 22 March 2011 – 12 September 2016

Winners & Losers is an Australian television drama series first broadcast on the Seven Network on 22 March 2011. It was created by the producers of Packed to the Rafters and is aired in the show's former time slot. Winners & Losers focuses on the lives of four women living in Melbourne, after they win a large amount of money in the Oz Lotto. Seven renewed Winners & Losers for a second season in July 2011 and it began airing from 26 June 2012. Two months later, it was announced the series had been renewed for a third season. A fourth season was confirmed on 19 December 2013. A fifth season was confirmed on 3 December 2014.

Angus Ross, the Director of Programming at the Seven Network, confirmed in an interview with Australian television blog TV Tonight that the fifth season of Winners & Losers would be the final season. The season premiered on 5 July 2016 and concluded on 12 September 2016.

== Plot ==
The series revolves around the lives of four women: Jenny Gross (Melissa Bergland), Bec Gilbert (Zoe Tuckwell-Smith), Frances James (Virginia Gay) and Sophie Wong (Melanie Vallejo). The girls were "the losers" in high school. Ten years later, they realise they are really winners once they are reunited at their school reunion and afterwards, win the Oz Lotto.

== Cast ==
=== Regular ===
- Melissa Bergland as Jenny Gross
- Virginia Gay as Frances James
- Melanie Vallejo as Sophie Wong
- Zoe Tuckwell-Smith as Bec Gilbert (series 1–4)
- Sarah Grace as Bridget Gross
- Paul Moore as Wes Fitzpatrick
- Nick Russell as Gabe Reynolds (series 3–5)
- Nathin Butler as Luke MacKenzie (series 3–5)
- James Saunders as Pete Reeves (series 3–5)
- Demi Harman as Riley Hart (series 5)
- Scott Smart as Alex MacKenzie (series 5)
- Tom Wren as Doug Graham (series 1–4)
- Denise Scott as Trish Gross (series 1–5)
- Francis Greenslade as Brian Gross (series 1–5)
- Jack Pearson as Patrick Gross (series 1–4)
- Damien Bodie as Jonathan Kurtiss (series 1–3)
- Stephen Phillips as Zach Armstrong (series 1–3)
- Mike Smith as Callum Gilbert (series 1–3)
- Blair McDonough as Matt O'Connor (series 1–2)
- Tom Hobbs as Flynn Johnson (series 2–3)
- Katherine Hicks as Sam MacKenzie (series 2–4)
- Sibylla Budd as Carla Hughes (series 3–4)
- Laura Gordon as Izzy Hughes (series 4)

=== Recurring ===
- Anne Phelan as Dot Gross (series 2–4)
- Madeleine West as Deirdre Gross (series 1)
- PiaGrace Moon as Jasmine Patterson (series 1–4)
- Nell Feeney as Carolyn Gilbert (series 1–4)
- Nick Simpson-Deeks as Rhys Mitchell (series 1–3)
- Greg Stone as Steve Gilbert (series 1–3)
- Michala Banas as Tiffany Turner (series 1–2, 5)
- Natalie Saleeba as Claire Armstrong (series 1–2)
- Luke Arnold as Lachie Clarke (series 2)
- Peta Sergeant as Cat Johnson (series 2)
- Thomas Lacey as Ollie Masters (series 2)
- Dieter Brummer as Jason Ross (series 3–4)
- David Paterson as Ryan Sharrock (series 3)
- Ben Geurens as Adam Grabowski (series 3)
- Luke McKenzie as Shannon Taylor (series 3)
- Ryan Hayward as Brett Tully (series 3)
- Dan O'Connor as Nate Simpson (series 3)
- Anna Samson as Hayley Baxter (series 4)
- Jacob Holt as Cory Baxter (series 4)
- Laurence Brewer as Jack Macauley (series 4)
- Carmen Duncan as Professor Kerry Green (10 episodes)
- Rupert Reid as Rob Hill (10 episodes)

=== Guests ===
- Adam Demos (1 episode)
- Amy Lehpamer as Scarlett Ford (1 episode)
- Andrew Blackman as Tom Shields (5 episodes)
- Bob Morley as Ethan Quinn (1 episode)
- Brett Swain as Roy Grbowski (1 episode)
- Cameron Nugent as Steve Ford (1 episode)
- Catherine Mack-Hancock as Tasha Reynolds (1 episode)
- Geoff Morrell as Paul Armstrong (4 episodes)
- Georgina Naidu as Dr Naveena Malik (3 episodes)
- Ian Bliss as Colin Gammell (2 episodes)
- Jane Clifton as Lynette Vanderthorpe (1 episode)
- Jansen Spencer as Jim (1 episode)
- Jessica Gower as Ava Murdoch (1 episode)
- Judith McGrath as Maria Crawley (3 episodes)
- Julia Blake as Gwen Armstrong (1 episode)
- Julie Nihill as Pauline Brown (1 episode)
- Matt Levett as Spencer Campbell (4 episodes)
- Nicholas Bell as Keith Maxwell (5 episodes)
- Nick Carrafa as Cliff Boyes (3 episodes)
- Nicki Paull as Leanne O'Connor (4 episodes)
- Paul Denny as Anthony Reeves (1 episode)
- Salme Geransar
- Sue Jones as Eileen Reeves (1 episode)
- Tony Rickards as Father Brennan (2 episodes)

== Production ==
=== Development ===
Winners & Losers was created by Bevan Lee. Lee wanted to create a drama focusing on females for a number of years before the programme's creation. He also created Packed to the Rafters. While the former is focused on family relationships, Winners and Losers concentrates on friendships and is aimed at a younger demographic. Lee said it focuses on the "fun and drama of how we all carry the inner loser inside us, no matter how much life makes a winner of us." Lee said the programme's genre is "charmedy" consisting of drama, comedy and charm.

At the time of early production, the main actresses were required to spend time together off set to build believable chemistry between themselves. The show's producer Maryanne Carroll was partly responsible for creating the lives of the four main female characters. She oversaw a "team of experts" who chose music for scenes, styled their homes and chose their clothing. The items placed in each home were designed to identify with the characters living there.

A pilot episode for the programme was created and shown to a research group. Network Seven's then-head of drama, John Holmes, said the research produced the expectation of high ratings. The series began airing on the Seven Network from 22 March 2011, four weeks earlier than originally planned. The fourth season of Packed to the Rafters was put on hiatus to allow Winners & Losers to air in its timeslot. The move was part of a programming strategy, with the aim of attracting a high viewing figures. The first episode gained the highest ratings of the evening, averaging at 1.7 million viewers. The Seven Network decided to air the second and third episodes back to back, securing the highest ratings once again. The programme continued to fare well with ratings in the following weeks. However the ratings for episode seven indicated that Winners and Losers had lost over four hundred thousand viewers. Though it was considered a ratings success and is among the twelve most watched programmes in Australia.

On 5 July 2011, Seven announced that it had renewed Winners & Losers for a second season in 2012. Filming for the new season began on 23 August 2011 and Lee said viewers would see big changes. He told the Herald Sun's Colin Vickery, "We turn the girls' lives on their heads in a pretty major way in the final episode (of series one). That will give us a new launching pad for season two." Filming on the second season was completed on 5 April 2012. The second season began airing from 26 June 2012.

Seven renewed Winners & Losers for a third season on 7 August 2012. Production on the third series began in September and the actors began filming the following month. Seven's head of drama, Julie McGauran commented "2013 is going to be a landmark year for Channel Seven's drama department. Our drama slate is at full capacity with the return of Winners & Losers as well as Packed to the Rafters, Home and Away and the new drama A Place to Call Home." The third season began airing from 9 July 2013. The show was renewed for a fourth season, with production beginning in early 2014. The show was renewed for a fifth season on 3 December 2014. The Seven Network confirmed that the fifth season would also be the last.

== Reception ==
=== Critical response ===
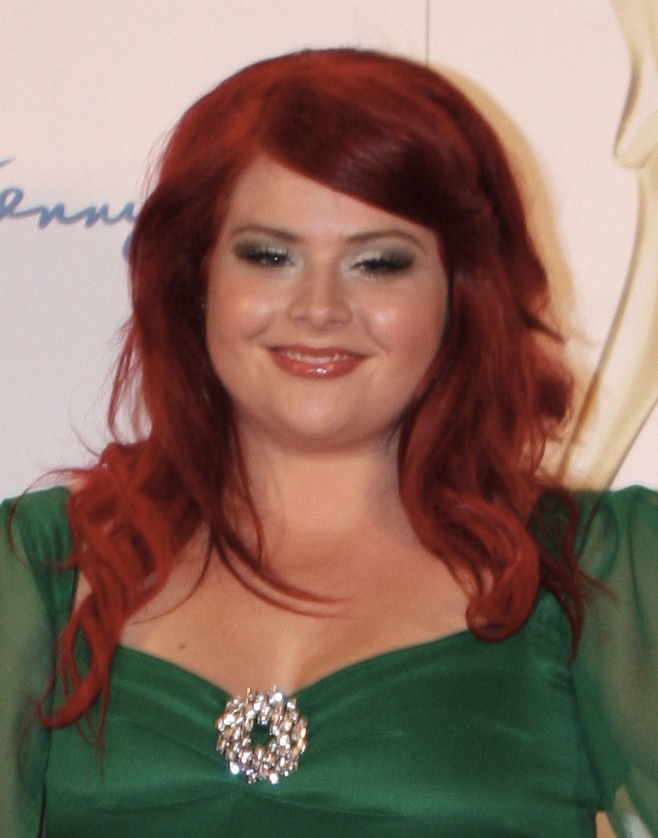
Melissa Bergland (pictured) won a Logie Award for her role as Jenny Gross.

Jim Schembri of The Sydney Morning Herald praised the series branding it a "fresh, brightly coloured, high-end soap." He deemed its characters as "some of the most engaging" roles on television. A columnist of The Advertiser attributed the show's success to its time slot and "creative force Bevan Lee." A columnist for The Age empathised with the good response the programme generated. They said the series had "powerful themes of friendship, karma and justice for the underdog", which were portrayed in a subtle tone in comparison to other programmes. They branded it "an engaging hour of television" due to inclusion on comedy and a "large cast of lively characters." However they noted some of the "fresh" storylines were similar those featured in shows such as Sex and the City. While their colleague Paul Kalina said the programme had played it safe by using similar elements that made Packed to the Rafters a success.

Bridget McManus from the publication reflected her opinion that the programme had lost its "edge" and had started to resemble a "poor girl's Sex and the City." She noted the main problem was that "potentially interesting characters" were overlooked by the four females. McManus felt they were tired stereotypes, describing them as "the virgin, the damned whore, God's policewoman and a clown." Debi Enker writing for The Sun-Herald said that the second series will require Winners & Losers to "lift its game" because the first was too reliant on caricatures. Enker stated as the "scheming ex-wife, true-blue Aussie family and flamboyant gay confidant"; which made "soapy" characters with not "enough nuance to give them a full-bodied life".

Of the show's third season, Craig Mathieson of The Age questioned whether the show had become a soap opera. He accused it of having a "multiple personality disorder". He observed it switching from "thriller" to "hold-hands melodrama" and "gently comic ode to emotional strength" with each different character it focused on.

=== Awards and nominations ===
Year	Award	Category	Recipients and nominees	Result
2012	AACTA Television Awards	Best Television Program	Winners & Losers	Nominated
2012	AACTA Television Awards	Best Male Performance	Tom Wren	Nominated
2012	Logie Awards	Most Outstanding New Talent	Melissa Bergland	Nominated
2012	Logie Awards	Most Popular Drama Series	Winners & Losers	Nominated
2012	Logie Awards	Most Popular New Female Talent	Melissa Bergland	Won
2012	Logie Awards	Most Popular New Male Talent	Tom Wren	Nominated
2014	Equity Awards	Outstanding Performance by an Ensemble in a Drama Series	Cast	Nominated
2014	Logie Awards	Most Popular Drama Program	Winners & Losers	Nominated

=== Ratings ===
Season	Timeslot (Australian)	# Ep.	First aired	Last aired	Peak viewers (millions)	Rank	Avg. viewers (millions)
1	Tuesday 8:30 pm	22	22 March 2011	23 August 2011	1,726,000	5	1,480,000
2	Tuesday 8:30 pm	22	26 June 2012	27 November 2012	1,439,000	5	1,247,000
3	Tuesday 8:30 pm	26	9 July 2013	24 June 2014	1,245,000	5	1,117,000
4	Tuesday 8:30 pm	26	1 July 2014	8 September 2015	993,000	N/A	
5	Tuesday 8:30 pm / 9:45 pm	13	5 July 2016	12 September 2016	N/A	N/A	

== Home media ==
DVD releases

DVD title	# Discs	Release date		
DVD title	# Discs	Region 2 (UK)	Region 4 (AU)	Region 4 (NZ)
Season 1	6	11 June 2012	21 September 2011	5 April 2012
Season 2	6	—N/a	28 November 2012	15 November 2013
Season 3	6	—N/a	3 July 2014	—N/a
Season 4 – Part One	3	—N/a	4 December 2014	—N/a
Season 4 – Part Two	3	—N/a	1 October 2015	—N/a
Season 5	3	—N/a	5 October 2016	—N/a
The Complete Series	27	—N/a	5 October 2016	—N/a

Soundtrack

A CD titled Winners & Losers (Music from the Hit Series) was released on 8 July 2011. It contains songs by various artists which were used in the programme. The CD peaked at 24 in the ARIA Album Charts.

== International broadcast ==
In March 2011, Winners & Losers was picked up for international distribution by FremantleMedia Enterprises. FremantleMedia represents the show worldwide, outside of Australia and New Zealand. In New Zealand, Winners & Losers began broadcasting on TV One from 2011. The following year, the show began airing in the United Kingdom on ITV2. Since 2011, it has been screened in several other European countries, including, Poland on Fox Life, Slovenia on POP Brio, Finland on YLE TV2, and from 2012, beginning broadcast in Croatia on Fox Life, Serbia on Fox Life, Portugal on SIC Radical, France on Téva, Ireland on RTÉ One, Belgium on Vitaya, Bulgaria on Fox Life, while in 2013, it screened in Turkey on e2, and in Hungary on Film Café, in 2014. It was broadcast in other countries, including Israel on Hot Family in 2011, South Africa on DStv in 2011, the Philippines on 2nd Avenue in 2014, and the Middle East and North Africa region on MBC 4 in 2016.
