= Nick Simpson-Deeks =

Australian actor

- Born: Nicholas Deeks; Werris Creek, New South Wales, Australia
- Occupation: Actor
- Years active: 2001–present
- Notable work: The Circuit, Winners & Losers, Deadloch

Nick Simpson-Deeks is a NIDA-trained Australian actor of stage and screen. He is best known for his portrayal of Archie McMahon in the SBS drama series The Circuit, Rhys Mitchell in Seven Network's Winners & Losers, and James King in the Amazon Original crime series Deadloch.

== Early life ==
Simpson-Deeks was born and raised in Werris Creek, New South Wales, and attended Oxley High School in Tamworth. He graduated from the National Institute of Dramatic Art in 2001. In 2006 he was awarded a Mike Walsh Fellowship which he used to further his actor training at the School at Steppenwolf in Chicago.

== Career ==
=== Film and television ===
Simpson-Deeks was a series regular in both seasons of the award-winning legal drama The Circuit, the second season of Winners & Losers (after guest starring in the show's first season), and the sci-fi series Stormworld. Additionally, he has guest-starred in Utopia, The Newsreader, Five Bedrooms, Underbelly: Fat Tony & Co., Wentworth, Mr & Mrs Murder, Play School, City Homicide, The Strange Calls, Temptation, and The Postcard Bandit. He plays forensic pathologist James King in the Amazon Original series Deadloch.

His film credits include roles in the short films After the Credits, Dropbear, A Simple Song, Shades of Grey and Home. He portrayed Irish rider Pat Smullen in the 2011 feature film The Cup, and filmmaker Billy Name in Jim Sharman's Andy X – a musical film based on the death of Andy Warhol.

=== Theatre ===
Simpson-Deeks made his professional theatre debut in Falling on My Left Ear: A Show about George Wallace for the now defunct Railway Street Theatre Company in Parramatta in 2002. The following year, he returned to Railway Street to play the role of Tom in Michael Gow's iconic Australian play, Away. Both productions toured regionally and were directed by Mary-Anne Gifford.

In 2005 he received critical acclaim for his performance in Mark Ravenhill's Handbag at the Seymour Centre. Later that year, he starred in Somewhere – an original musical by Tim Minchin and Kate Mulvany – for Q Theatre.

In 2009, Simpson-Deeks was cast in the ensemble of Jerry Springer: the Opera at the Sydney Opera House as part of Sydney Festival. He joined the original Australian cast of Jersey Boys, in the role of Franki Valli (Alternate), that same year, but left the production prematurely due to health complications. In 2010, he sang the role of Skeets Miller in a one-off concert performance of Adam Guettel's Floyd Collins at City Recital Hall in Sydney.

Simpson-Deeks played the role of Constable Alexander Fitzpatrick in Ned: A New Australian Musical at Bendigo's Ulumbarra Theatre in 2015, and is featured on the show's Official Cast Recording. He reprised the role in concert at The National Theatre, Melbourne in 2017.

He played Chris Bean in the Australian production of The Play That Goes Wrong, and briefly reprised the role during the Australian tour of Peter Pan Goes Wrong in 2019. In between, he toured nationally as Cassius in Bell Shakespeare's Julius Caesar.

Simpson-Deeks has worked extensively with Watch This – a Melbourne-based theatre company dedicated exclusively to the work of Stephen Sondheim – starring in seven of their nine productions to date.

In 2019 he received a Green Room Award for Best Supporting Actor in Musical Theatre for his performance in Falsettos at Melbourne's Chapel Off Chapel. He has been nominated for six Green Room Awards in total.

In 2023, he played the role of Mike Priddle in the Australian premiere of Ghost Stories, at the Athenaeum Theatre in Melbourne.

=== Other work ===
Simpson-Deeks created the character of Daniel 'Danno' Bookham for the popular educational video game Murder Under the Microscope, and played the role from 2007 to 2012.

In 2018, Simpson-Deeks was featured in the six-part web series Freudian Slip, alongside writer and commentator Benjamin Law.

== Filmography ==
=== Film ===
Year	Title	Roles	Notes
2015	Home	Theo	Short film
2014	Dropbear	Dad	Short film
2012	Andy X	Billy Name	Short film
2011	The Cup	Pat Smullen	Feature film
2011	The Strange Calls	Judd	Short film
2010	After the Credits	Passenger	Short film
2003	Temptation	Agent	TV movie
2003	The Postcard Bandit	Prison Guard Greg	TV movie

=== Television ===
Year	Title	Roles	Notes	Ref
2023-25	The Newsreader	Paul	TV series: 6 episodes	
2023	Utopia	Bryce	TV series 1 episode	
2023	Deadloch	James King	TV series, 6 episodes	
2021	Five Bedrooms	Roger	TV series, 1 episode	
2018	Freudian Slip	Jacob's Super Ego	TV series, 7 episodes	
2011-14	Winners & Losers	Rhys Mitchell	TV series, 18 episodes	
2014	Fat Tony & Co.	Bruno Rich	TV miniseries, 3 episodes	
2013	Mr & Mrs Murder	Tyler Betts	TV series, 1 episode	
2012	The Strange Calls	Nick	TV series, 1 episode	
2010	City Homicide	Lleyton Brenner	TV series, 1 episode	
2007-10	The Circuit	Archie McMahon	TV series, 11 episodes	
2009	Stormworld	Apssed	TV series, 13 episodes	

=== Video game ===
Year	Title	Roles	Notes
2007–2012	Murder Under the Microscope	Daniel 'Danno' Bookham	Educational video game

== Theatre ==
Year	Title	Roles	Notes
2000	Road	Brink / Mr Iger / Tom Stanley / Blowpipe	NIDA Parade Theatre
2000	Masurca Fogo	Dancer	Sydney Olympic Arts Festival
2000	A Midsummer Night’s Dream	Egeus / Puck	NIDA Parade Theatre with Night Sky Productions
2001	Kiss Me, Kate		NIDA Parade Theatre
2002	Falling on My Left Ear: A Show about George Wallace	Young George Wallace	Railway Street Theatre Company
2003	Away	Tom / Rick	Railway Street Theatre Company
2004	Dot by Dot with Sondheim	Lover	Cabaret @ Bar Me
2004	Into the Woods	Rapunzel's Prince	
2004	Embalmer! The Musical	Craig	Naked Theatre Company
2005	In the Raw: The Windows Project	Nick	Darlinghurst Theatre
2005	Handbag	Phil	Seymour Centre with Focus Theatre Company
2005	Somewhere: The Magical Musical of Penrith	Sam	Q Theatre
2005	Much Ado About Nothing	Claudio / Dogberry	Night Sky Productions
2005	Rosie	Willy / Louie / Rita etc	Independent Theatre, Sydney
2006	The Paper Wall	Troy	
2006	Little Black Book	Mick	
2006	A Midsummer Night’s Dream	Lysander	
2007	Floyd Collins	Skeets Miller	Angel Place City Recital Hall, Sydney Theatre with Kookaburra Musical Theatre
2007	Twelfth Night	Feste	
2008	The Turning	Vic Lang	Playhouse, Perth with Perth Theatre Company for Perth International Arts Festival
2008	Risky Lunar Love	Rabbit	CarriageWorks, Sydney with 504 Producers
2009	Jerry Springer the Opera	Ensemble	Sydney Opera House for Sydney Festival
2009	Jersey Boys	Frankie Valli (alternative)	Princess Theatre, Melbourne with New Theatricals
2010	The Shakespeare Revue	Various	
2013–2014	Assassins	The Balladeer / Lee Harvey Oswald	Fortyfivedownstairs, West Gippsland Arts Centre with Watch This
2014	The Parricide	Kolya / Mitya	La Mama
2014	Pacific Overtures	Manjirō	Theatre Works, Melbourne with Watch This
2015	Sweet Phoebe	Fraser	Basement Theatre, Auckland with Both Sides Now Theatre Company
2015; 2017	Ned: A New Australian Musical	Constable Alexander Fitzpatrick	Ulumbarra Theatre, Bendigo with Groaning Dam Productions, National Theatre, Melbourne
2015–2016	Company	Robert	Fortyfivedownstairs, Geelong Arts Centre, Her Majesty's Theatre, Ballarat, West Gippsland Arts Centre with Watch This
2016; 2018	Elegy	Iraqi refugee (solo performer)	Gasworks Melbourne, Stratford Courthouse Theatre Melbourne, West Gippsland Arts Centre, Ararat Performing Arts Centre, Her Majesty's Theatre Ballarat, Geelong Arts Centre with Lab Kelpie
2017	The Play That Goes Wrong	Chris Bean	Comedy Theatre, Melbourne, Her Majesty's Theatre, Adelaide, Roslyn Packer Theatre, Canberra Theatre, Concert Hall QPAC, His Majesty's Theatre Perth with Mischief Theatre
2018	Falsettos	Mendel	Chapel Off Chapel with StageArt
2018	Julius Caesar	Cassius	Australian tour with Bell Shakespeare
2018	A Little Night Music	Director / Assistant	National Theatre, Melbourne with Watch This
2019	Sunday in the Park with George	George	Southbank Theatre with Watch This
2019	Peter Pan Goes Wrong	Chris Bean	Australian tour
2021	The Art of Making Art		Online
2022	Into the Woods	Wolf / Cinderella's Prince	Arts House Meat Market, Melbourne with Watch This
2022	Ghost Stories	Mike Priddle	Melbourne Athenaeum with Realscape Productions

== Awards and nominations ==
Year	Award	Category	Work	Result
2006	Mike Walsh Fellowship Award	Award for Acting		Won
2007	Macquarie Bank Youth Award	Award for Screenwriting		Won
2009	West Australian Screen Awards	Best Actor (Short Film)	Shades of Grey	Nominated
2013	Green Room Awards	Supporting Actor (Musical Theatre)	Assassins	Nominated
2014	Green Room Awards	Supporting Actor (Musical Theatre)	Pacific Overtures	Nominated
2015	Green Room Awards	Leading Actor (Musical Theatre)	Company	Nominated
2019	Green Room Awards	Supporting Actor (Musical Theatre)	Falsettos	Won
2021	Green Room Awards	Celebration of Online Performance*	The Art of Making Art	Nominated
2022	Green Room Awards	Supporting Actor (Musical Theatre)	Into the Woods	Nominated

*Nominated with Sonya Suares, Nick McInerney, Dean Drieberg and Mel Hillman
