= Danuta Pfeiffer =

American journalist, broadcaster and writer

- Born: Danuta Rylko; February 22, 1949 (age 76); England
- Occupations: Author; journalist; broadcaster
- Spouse: Kai Soderman (m. 1983; div. 1988) Robin Pfeiffer (m. 1994)

Danuta Pfeiffer (née Rylko, formerly Soderman) (born February 22, 1949) is an author and retired journalist and broadcaster best known for co-hosting The 700 Club from 1983 to 1988 with Pat Robertson and Ben Kinchlow.

== Early life ==
Born in England after World War II to a father who was a Polish emigre and sculptor and an English mother who was a nurse, Danuta Rylko moved to the United States as a child, with her family, shortly after her birth. She grew up in northern Michigan, near Bellaire.

She began her career in San Diego, California as a newsreader on radio, and co-host of SunUp San Diego on KFMB-TV from 1976 to 1983.

== The 700 Club ==
Rylko was hired by the Christian Broadcasting Network after becoming a born-again Christian. Initially hired to be CBN's foreign correspondent in Jerusalem, she was instead made co-host of The 700 Club days after arriving at CBN's headquarters in Virginia Beach, Virginia. Reflecting on her experiences in her memoirs, she wrote: "But no one ever asked me about my politics. I was converted by association from my liberal democratic feminism to conservative Republican fundamentalism. I felt like a wolf in sheep’s clothing adapting somewhat awkwardly to becoming one of the sheep."

In 1985, she broke the story of the John Anthony Walker spy ring when she interviewed Walker's daughter, Laura Walker Snyder, for CBN. During the interview, Snyder detailed how her father had allegedly intimidated and manipulated his children into becoming spies.

She was fired by Robertson in 1988 after he learned that her then-husband, Kai Soderman, had previously been twice married and divorced.

She married Swedish businessman Kai Soderman in 1983, six months after joining The 700 Club. Soderman was a suicidal alcoholic and the two eventually divorced after she moved back to California.

== After CBN ==
She ceased being a Christian as a result of her experiences at CBN and returned to San Diego where she hosted Danuta Time, on KSDO radio in the late 1980s and was also a news commentator on KUSI-TV in the early 1990s. She moved to Colorado, where she was a columnist for the Colorado Eagle, before moving to Oregon in 1994 to be closer to her family. There she met and married her second husband, Robin Pfeiffer, a winery owner, in 1994. From 1994, she was co-owner, with her husband, of Pfeiffer Winery in Oregon. The couple sold their vineyard in 2023 and closed their winery so they could spend more time with their family and traveling.

In 2016, she supported Bernie Sanders's presidential campaign.

== Author ==
Pfeiffer has written a memoir called Chiseled: A Memoir of Identity, Duplicity, and Divine Wine (2015) about her life in general as well as her experiences with CBN. She has also written Libertas (2021), and Firmitas (2022) the first two novels of a trilogy, A Pocket Full of Seeds, telling the story of a couple escaping slavery and travelling the Oregon Trail.

== Bibliography ==
- Watersafe Your Baby in One Week (as Danuta Rylko), 1983
- Dear Danuta: Cries and Whispers of Searching Hearts (as Danuta Soderman), 1986
- A passion for living (co-authors: Danuta Soderman & Kai Soderman), 1987
- Chiseled: A Memoir of Identity, Duplicity, and Divine Wine (as Danuta Pfeiffer), 2015
- Libertas: Book One in the Pocket Full of Seeds Trilogy, 2021
- Firmitas: Book Two in the Pocket Full of Seeds Trilogy, 2022
