= Gordon P. Robertson =

American lawyer (born 1958)

Gordon Robertson
- Born: Gordon Perry Robertson; June 4, 1958 (age 68); New York City, U.S.
- Education: Yale University (BA); Washington and Lee University (JD)
- Occupations: Media executive; attorney; speaker; author; university chancellor
- Known for: Co-host and Executive Producer, The 700 Club; President, Operation Blessing International; Chancellor, Regent University
- Spouse: Katharyn Robertson (m. 1989)
- Children: 3
- Parents: Pat Robertson (father); Adelia Elmer (mother)
- Relatives: Absalom Willis Robertson (grandfather)

Gordon Perry Robertson (born June 4, 1958) is an American lawyer and broadcaster who is the president of the Christian Broadcasting Network, former president of Operation Blessing International, and chancellor of Regent University. Since 2021, he is the main host of The 700 Club, the show founded by his father, Pat Robertson, having co-hosted the program since 1999.

== Early life ==
Robertson was born in New York City to Pat and Adelia (née Elmer) Robertson. His father had graduated from Yale Law School and would soon earn his Master of Divinity at The Biblical Seminary in New York. His mother, Dede, had a Master of Nursing degree from Yale School of Nursing. When Robertson was two years old, his father and mother started Christian Broadcasting Network in Portsmouth, Virginia.

Raised in Virginia, Robertson attended The McCallie School, a college-preparatory school in Chattanooga, Tennessee, and graduated cum laude in 1976. He then graduated from Yale University in 1980 with a bachelor's degree in history. After obtaining his B.A., Robertson enrolled in Washington and Lee University School of Law, became a Burks Scholar in his third year, and received his Juris Doctor, cum laude, in 1984.

== Career ==
=== Early career ===
Robertson practiced law at Vandeventer, Black in Norfolk, Virginia, becoming a partner in 1989. In 1994 on a short-term mission trip to India with Rev. John Giminez, Robertson had a profound religious experience that changed the course of his life. He left the practice of law and moved his family to the Philippines to start the Asian Center for Missions.

In Manila in 1994, Robertson partnered with Dr. Miguel Alvarez of Asian School of Christian Ministries to begin a school to train and send Filipino missionaries throughout the world. From an initial class of 12 missionaries in November 1994, ACM became the largest missionary organization in the Philippines. In 1995, he founded the Asian Center for Missions (ACM), a training facility aimed to deploy Filipino Christians as missionaries across Asia and beyond.

=== Christian Broadcasting Network ===
In July 1994, Pat Robertson appointed him “Ambassador at Large” for CBN with the goal of reproducing CBN in Asia. On October 1, 1994, Gordon founded CBN Asia, Inc. in Manila, Philippines. In 1996, CBN Asia started a television show, The 700 Club Asia, in the Tagalog language featuring testimonies from the Philippines and stories from around Asia. CBN Asia became the model for starting CBN Indonesia, CBN India, CBN Thailand, CBN Hong Kong and CBN China in Beijing. In December 2007, he succeeded his father as CEO of the company.

==== The 700 Club ====
Gordon returned to the United States in April 1999 to co-host the original 700 Club and, more recently, The 700 Club Interactive program which is seen on Freeform and online. Robertson was made full-time host of The 700 Club on October 1, 2021, when Pat announced on the show that he was stepping down. This was on the date of the 60th anniversary of CBN’s first broadcast (Oct 1, 1961). During his time at The 700 Club, Robertson has interviewed a variety of cultural figures, including Benjamin Netanyahu, Jimmy Carter, Senator George J. Mitchell (D), Senator Chris Coons (D), Senator Sam Brownback (R), Israel’s UN Ambassador Danny Danon, and Ron DeSantis (R).

==== Superbook and CBN Films ====
Gordon is the Executive Producer for Superbook, a Bible-based animation series using CG technology which has the same name as the English dubbed version of a Japanese produced “anime” that CBN also helped to create. Both series follow the adventures of two children, Chris and Joy, and their robot friend Gizmo, as they journey back in time to experience the stories and characters in the bible. The original series premiered in Japan in 1981. The newer series was released in 2011.

In 2014, the new Superbook series received two Daytime Emmy nominations, for Outstanding Achievement in Main Title and Graphic Design, and Outstanding Original Song – Main Title and Promo.

Robertson is the Executive Producer of CBN Films. CBN films launched in 2014 and has produced twelve projects as of 2023. Made in Israel (2014), The Hope: The Rebirth of Israel (2015), and To Life: How Israeli Volunteers are Changing the World (2018) were all Emmy nominated films. In Our Hands: The Battle for Jerusalem (2017) debuted in United States theaters as one of the highest-grossing documentaries of the year.

Robertson was the executive producer of the 2016 docudrama Pocahontas: Dove of Peace.

=== Operation Blessing ===
Robertson began working with Operation Blessing International in 1995 as President and Founder of Operation Blessing Philippines. He then founded Obor Berkat in Indonesia, Operation Blessing India, Operation Blessing Thailand, and Operation Blessing China. In 2018, he became the President of Operation Blessing International, assuming the position after Bill Horan. In October 2025, Robertson transitioned from his role as President to Chairman of the Board with its Chief Operating Officer Drew Friedrich taking his place.

=== Chancellor of Regent University ===
Robertson was named Chancellor of Regent University on July 10, 2023 after the passing of his father Pat, who held the role since the school's inception.

== Personal life ==
Robertson met Katharyn (née Banks) in 1988 and they married in 1989. They live in Virginia and have three children and 1 grandchild.

His grandfather, Absalom Willis Robertson, was a Democratic U.S. Senator from Virginia.
