= Pat Robertson controversies =

Aspect of the American religious broadcaster

Baptist minister and broadcaster Pat Robertson (1930–2023) had outspoken opinions on religion, politics, and other subjects. Many of his statements have stirred controversy and several have been headline news in the United States and elsewhere. Robertson made many of these comments on his daily talk show, The 700 Club.

== Religiocentrism ==
=== Calling non-Christians "termites" ===
In an August 1986 New York magazine article Robertson was quoted as saying: "It is interesting, that termites don't build things, and the great builders of our nation almost to a man have been Christians, because Christians have the desire to build something. He is motivated by love of man and God, so he builds. The people who have come into [our] institutions [today] are primarily termites. They are into destroying institutions that have been built by Christians, whether it is universities, governments, our own traditions, that we have [...] The termites are in charge now, and that is not the way it ought to be, and the time has arrived for a godly fumigation."

=== Comments about other Christian denominations ===
On January 14, 1991, on The 700 Club, Pat Robertson attacked a number of Protestant denominations when he declared: "You say you're supposed to be nice to the Episcopalians and the Presbyterians and the Methodists and this, that, and the other thing. Nonsense. I don't have to be nice to the spirit of the Antichrist."

=== Comments about Islam ===
Robertson frequently denounced the religion of Islam and Muslim people. During a 1995 taping of The 700 Club, he called the religion a "Christian heresy". During a September 19, 2002, episode of Fox News Channel's Hannity & Colmes, Robertson claimed that the Muslim prophet Muhammad was "an absolute wild-eyed fanatic [...] a robber and a brigand." On the July 14, 2005, broadcast of The 700 Club, he claimed that "Islam, at its core, teaches violence."

On the March 13, 2006, broadcast of The 700 Club Robertson stated that Muslims want global domination and that the outpouring of rage elicited by cartoon drawings of the Islamic prophet Muhammad "just shows the kind of people we're dealing with. These people are crazed fanatics, and I want to say it now: I believe it's motivated by demonic power. It is Satanic and it's time we recognize what we're dealing with." He finished by stating "by the way, Islam is not a religion of peace." The Rev. Barry W. Lynn, executive director of Americans United for Separation of Church and State, slammed Robertson's comments as "grossly irresponsible". Lynn went on to say, "At a time when inter-religious tensions around the world are at an all-time high, Robertson seems determined to throw gasoline on the fire."

On the September 25, 2006, broadcast of The 700 Club Robertson stated "It's amazing how the Muslims deal with history and the truth with violence. They don't understand what reasoned dialogue is."

On the November 9, 2009, edition of The 700 Club Robertson stated "Islam is a violent – I was going to say, 'religion', but it's not a religion; it's a political system. It's a violent political system bent on the overthrow of the governments of the world, and world domination. That is the ultimate aim. And they talk about infidels and all this, but the truth is that's what the game is. So, you're dealing with a – not a religion – you're dealing with a political system. And I think we should treat it as such, and treat its adherents as such, as we would members of the Communist Party, or members of some fascist group."

In 2015, Robertson called Islam a "political system intent on world domination" and stated that it is not a religion.

=== Comments about Hinduism ===
On March 23, 1995, Pat Robertson led a television program in which he attacked Hinduism, calling it "demonic". He said that they worship "idols" and "hundreds of millions of deities", which "has put a nation in bondage to spiritual forces that have deceived many for thousands of years". He spoke against the doctrines of karma and reincarnation.

These and other remarks have been repudiated by some Hindus. Dr. Kusumita Pedersen, Director for the Project on Human Rights and Religion, commented that Robertson had employed "almost every negative image and cliché that has been used about Hinduism since the 18th century".

In his book The New World Order, Robertson wrote: "When I said during my presidential bid that I would bring only Christians and Jews into the government, I hit a firestorm. 'What do you mean?' the media challenged me. 'You're not going to bring atheists into the government? How dare you maintain that those who believe in Christian values are better qualified to govern America than Hindus and Muslims?' My simple answer is, 'Yes, they are.'"

David Cantor, Senior Research Analyst of the Anti-Defamation League, points out that such "religious tests for office are unconstitutional. It's not just a purely a religious statement. It's a political statement."

=== Comments about Buddhism ===
In 2015, a woman called into Pat Robertson's televangelist channel complaining that her workplace is predominantly Buddhist, and she was agitated about it. She asked Robertson for advice on how to handle the situation. He responded by drawing an analogy of Buddhism to medical disease, asserting that mild exposure to the disease would not result in infection, but that more extensive exposure will result in infection. He then concluded that she ought to remove herself from the job to prevent more exposure to Buddhism.

=== Allegations of antisemitism ===
Robertson's 1991 book The New World Order made the news in 1995 when it was reviewed by Michael Lind in The New York Review of Books, which stated, "Not since Father Coughlin or Henry Ford has a prominent white American so boldly and unapologetically blamed the disasters of modern world history on the machinations of international high finance in general and on a few influential Jews in particular." The Christian Century stated that "Lind and Heilbrun show how Robertson took over—in some cases word for word—well-worn theories of a Jewish conspiracy. In particular, Robertson relied on the work of Nesta Webster and Eustace Mullins." Christianity Today argued, "certainly all evidence suggests that he is anything but antisemitic. (Some of the sources Robertson drew on do appear to be at least covertly so.)" The Anti-Defamation League asked Robertson to denounce the concept of a "worldwide Jewish conspiracy", to which Robertson responded in a statement to the New York Times, "I deeply regret that anyone in the Jewish community believes that my description of international bankers and use of the phrase 'European bankers' in my book refers to Jews". In a private instance in 1980, Robertson reportedly referred to Jews as "spiritually blind and spiritually deaf".

== Predictions ==
Several times near New Year, Robertson made statements purporting that God told him several truths or events that would happen in the following year. "I have a relatively good track record," he said. "Sometimes I miss."

=== 1982: Judgment ===
Robertson regularly expressed his opinions and made statements about the potential for uprisings, turmoil, violence, and times of judgement or God's wrath. In late 1976, Robertson predicted that the end of the world was coming in October or November 1982. In the May 19, 1982, broadcast of The 700 Club, Robertson stated, "I guarantee you by the fall of 1982 there is going to be a judgment on the world."

In September 2011, Robertson and several others who incorrectly predicted various dates for the end of the world were jointly awarded an Ig Nobel Prize for "teaching the world to be careful when making mathematical assumptions and calculations".

=== 2004: Presidential election ===
In January 2004, Robertson said that God told him President Bush would be re-elected in a "blowout" in the election later that year. "I think George Bush is going to win in a walk", Robertson told viewers of his The 700 Club program. "I really believe I'm hearing from the Lord it's going to be like a blowout election in 2004. It's shaping up that way." Bush did in fact win re-election, however, not by a landslide (just 35 electoral votes and 50.7% pop. vote).

=== 2006: Pacific Northwestern tsunami ===
In May 2006, Robertson declared that storms and possibly a tsunami would hit America's coastline sometime in 2006. Robertson supposedly received this revelation from God during an annual personal prayer retreat in January. The claim was repeated four times on The 700 Club.

On May 8, 2006, Robertson said, "If I heard the Lord right about 2006, the coasts of America will be lashed by storms." On May 17, 2006, he elaborated, "There well may be something as bad as a tsunami in the Pacific Northwest." On November 15, 2006, a tsunami did in fact strike Crescent City, California, causing an estimated $700,000 in damages.

=== 2007: Terror attack ===
On the January 2, 2007, broadcast of The 700 Club, Robertson said that God spoke to him and told him that "mass killings" were to come during 2007, due to a terrorist attack on the United States. He added, "The Lord didn't say nuclear. But I do believe it will be something like that." When a terrorist attack failed to happen in 2007, Robertson said, in January 2008, "All I can think is that somehow the people of God prayed and God in his mercy spared us."

=== 2008: Mideast meltdown ===
In October 2008, Robertson posted a press release on the Georgian conflict speculating that the conflict was a Russian ploy to enter the Middle East, and that instability caused by a predicted pre-emptive strike by Israel on Iran would result in Syria's and Iran's launching nuclear strikes on other targets. He also said that if the United States were to oppose Russia's expansion, nuclear strikes on American soil are also pending. "We will suffer grave economic damage, but will not engage in military action to stop the conflict. However, we may not be spared nuclear strikes against coastal cities. In conclusion, it is my opinion that we have between 75 and 120 days before the Middle East starts spinning out of control."

=== 2009: Economic chaos and recovery ===
On the January 1, 2009, broadcast of The 700 Club, Robertson said, "If I'm hearing [God] right, gold will go to about $1900 an ounce and oil to $300 a barrel." He also suggested that Americans would broadly accept socialism. Despite these predictions, he also said that economically "things are getting ready to turn around".

=== 2012: Presidential election ===
On January 4, 2012, Robertson reported that God had spoken to him and he "thinks He showed me the next president" but would not name who it was. He did give an indication that it would not be President Obama since Robertson said God told him Obama's views were at "odds with the majority", but left some room for interpretation had the 2012 election expanded beyond a two-person race. Closer to the election, however, he expressly stated that God had told him that Mitt Romney would win and would be a two-term President. Obama was reelected for a second term.

=== 2020: Presidential election and asteroid strike ===
On October 20, 2020, Robertson erroneously predicted that Donald Trump would win a second term in the 2020 presidential election. Trump went on to be defeated by Joe Biden. Robertson also said there would be assassination attempts against Trump, and later an asteroid would hit that could destroy the Earth. On December 10, 2020, Robertson called the Texas v. Pennsylvania lawsuit, which was filed by Texas Attorney General Ken Paxton, a "miracle" and predicted that "God himself would intervene" to keep Trump in office. After Biden was certified the winner by the United States Electoral College in December, Robertson, after briefly supporting Trump's legal disputes seeking to overturn the results, said Trump should concede. He also said Trump running again in 2024 would be a "mistake" and offered Nikki Haley as an alternative.

== Criticism of Robertson's faith healing ==
In the 1970s and 1980s, Robertson was a faith healer. James Randi devoted a chapter of his book The Faith Healers to criticizing Robertson's faith healing. Randi commented that "in 1986, soon after the full importance of the AIDS epidemic began to become evident, Robertson was attempting to cure it by proclaiming people cured after prayer." Randi also observed, "Gerry Straub, a former associate of Pat Robertson and his television producer, pointed out in his book Salvation for Sale the astonishing fact that God seemed to time miracles to conform with standard television format," and "God would stop speaking to Pat and stop healing exactly in time with the theme music." Randi explained that "in 1979, it appeared to Robertson's staff that their boss had been taking lessons from Oral Roberts" and "proposed to film the Second Coming!". The project was eventually publicly dropped, but "budget allocations [CBN] are made for their development."

== Efficacy of Robertson's prayers ==
Robertson prayed to God to steer hurricanes away from his company's Virginia Beach, Virginia headquarters. He credited his prayers for steering the course of Hurricane Gloria in 1985. The storm instead hit the Mid-Atlantic states and New England, causing $900 million in damage and eight deaths. In 2018, he prayed that Hurricane Florence would stay away from the east coast region.

== First child conceived out of wedlock ==
During Robertson's unsuccessful presidential bid in 1987, Robertson told a reporter from The Wall Street Journal that his wedding date was actually five months after the date he had always maintained. Reporters said that the actual wedding date meant that his first son was conceived out of wedlock and that Robertson had lied about the date of his marriage in an attempt to cover the truth up. While conceding the reports were accurate, Robertson said that begetting his son out of wedlock occurred before Jesus Christ had entered his life. Robertson denounced the media choosing to report on the issue as "outrageous" and "reprehensible".

== Feminism, homosexuality, abortion and liberalism ==
Robertson opposed abortion and same-sex marriage. He described feminism as a "socialist, anti-family political movement that encourages women to leave their husbands, kill their children, practice witchcraft, destroy capitalism and become lesbians."

Many of Robertson's opinions mirrored those of fellow evangelical pastor Jerry Falwell, who frequently appeared on The 700 Club. He agreed with Falwell when Falwell stated that the September 11 terrorist attacks were caused by "pagans, abortionists, feminists, gays, lesbians, the American Civil Liberties Union and the People for the American Way."

The June 8, 1998, episode of his show, on which Robertson denounced Orlando, Florida, and Disney World for allowing a privately sponsored "Gay Days" weekend, also drew criticism from Americans United for Separation of Church and State. Robertson stated that the acceptance of homosexuality could result in hurricanes, earthquakes, tornadoes, terrorist bombings and "possibly a meteor", prompting Americans United to criticize Robertson, saying it was "deplorable that Robertson is using the tragedy of these fires to promote his religious and political agenda." The resulting outcry prompted Robertson to return to the topic on June 24, where he quoted the Book of Revelation to support his claims. The first hurricane of the 1998 Atlantic hurricane season, Hurricane Bonnie, actually turned away from Florida and instead damaged the rest of the East Coast. The area hardest hit by the hurricane was the Hampton Roads region, which includes Virginia Beach, the place of origin of Robertson's The 700 Club. While other hurricanes did hit Florida, none of them hit Disney World.

While discussing the Mark Foley scandal on the October 5, 2006, broadcast of the show, Robertson condemned Foley, saying he "does what gay people do" and claiming that it would not hurt Republican chances in the elections, as "the church people understand forgiveness, they understand sin".

Following the Supreme Court's decision in Obergefell v. Hodges that legalized same-sex marriage in the United States, Robertson stated, on the June 29, 2015, episode of The 700 Club, in response to the ruling that, "You're gonna say that you like anal sex, you like oral sex, you like bestiality." He continued: "Sooner or later, you're going to have to conform your religious beliefs to the group of some abhorrent thing. It won't stop at homosexuality."

In 2019, Robertson stated that God would get rid of the United States as a nation and that "the land will vomit you out" if the Equality Act passed. He also predicted that an "atomic war" would break out if the law passed.

== Comments about Scotland ==
In 1999, the Bank of Scotland announced a joint venture with Robertson to establish banks in the United States that conduct all business by telephone, a business model that had been successful in the United Kingdom. Robertson said that the Church of Scotland and the Scottish Episcopal Church ignored the teachings of Saint Paul because they had ordained gays. Robertson also said that Scotland was "a dark land" overrun by gays. In response the Bank of Scotland dropped their plans for a business operation with Robertson, following customer complaints. In a press release, Robertson said that "media comments about him had made it impossible to proceed".

== Financial ties to politicians ==
An investigation by the Commonwealth of Virginia's Office of Consumer Affairs determined that Robertson "willfully induced contributions from the public through the use of misleading statements and other implications" and called for a criminal prosecution against Robertson in 1999. However, Virginia Attorney General Mark Earley, a Republican whose largest campaign contributor two years earlier was Robertson himself, intervened, accepting that Robertson had made deceptive appeals but overruling the recommendation for his prosecution.

== Comments about Chinese abortions ==
In a 2001 interview with CNN's Wolf Blitzer, Robertson said that the Chinese were "doing what they have to do", regarding China's one-child policy, sometimes enforced with compulsory abortions, though he said that he did not personally agree with the practice. The statement drew criticisms from a variety of groups, including the Family Research Council, Traditional Values Coalition, and Concerned Women for America.

== Racehorse ownership ==
In April 2002, Robertson acknowledged buying a race horse, named "Mr. Pat", for $520,000. He told a New York Times reporter that his interest in the horse was based purely on its aesthetics. "I don't bet and I don't gamble. I just enjoy watching horses running and performing." Christian scholar Martin Marty criticised this statement by Robertson, stating "The whole culture of horse racing involves gambling, and all the money comes from people trying to hit it big gambling. This is like saying you're investing in a bordello but aren't in favor of prostitution."

== Financial ties to African leaders ==
Robertson repeatedly supported the former President of Liberia, Charles Taylor, on various episodes of his The 700 Club program during the United States' involvement in the Second Liberian Civil War in June and July 2003. Robertson accused the U.S. State Department of supporting Taylor's ouster as president of Liberia by giving President Bush bad advice, and he also accused it of trying "as hard as they can to destabilize Liberia."

Robertson was criticized for failing to mention his $8,000,000 (USD) investment in a Liberian gold mine on his broadcasts. Taylor had been indicted by the United Nations for war crimes at the time of Robertson's support, and was found guilty of crimes against humanity, including murder, rape, slavery and the use of child soldiers.

Prosecutors also stated that Taylor had harbored members of Al Qaeda who were responsible for the 1998 U.S. embassy bombings in Kenya and Tanzania. According to Robertson, the use of the Liberian gold mine or the Freedom Gold as he called it, was intended to help pay for humanitarian and evangelical efforts in Liberia, but in fact, the company was allowed to fail by being allowed to leave many debts in Liberia as well as in the international mining service sector. Regarding this controversy, Richard Land, head of the Southern Baptist Convention's public policy said, "I would say that Pat Robertson is way out on his own, in a leaking life raft, on this one."

== Operation Blessing ==
Robertson was also accused of using his tax-exempt, nonprofit organization, Operation Blessing International, as a front for his own financial gain, and then using his influence in the Republican Party to cover his tracks. After Robertson made emotional pleas in 1994 on The 700 Club for cash donations to Operation Blessing to support airlifts of refugees from Rwanda to Zaire, a reporter from The Virginian-Pilot stated that Operation Blessing's planes were transporting diamond-mining equipment for the Robertson-owned African Development Corporation, a venture Robertson had established in cooperation with Zaire's dictator, Mobutu Sese Seko, whom Robertson had befriended earlier in 1993. According to Operation Blessing documents, Robertson personally owned the planes used for Operation Blessing airlifts. A documentary exploring the Operation Blessing controversies, entitled Mission Congo, premiered at the 2013 Toronto International Film Festival.

Robertson continued to state that Operation Blessing was largely responsible for providing aid to Rwanda following the 1994 genocide, even after an official investigation into Operation Blessing described it as a "fraudulent and deceptive" operation that provided almost no aid. According to The Guardian, all Operation Blessing volunteers did was recite Bible passages at dying refugees. Robertson was accused of taking credit for work that was actually done by Médecins Sans Frontières. On December 12, 2013, The Guardian issued an apology to Operation Blessing over false claims in the article "Mission Congo: how Pat Robertson raised millions on the back of a non-existent aid project", and agreed to make a contribution to Operation Blessing to be used in its relief efforts for victims of Typhoon Haiyan in the Philippines. A 1999 report concluded that whilst Robertson's requests for donations to Operation Blessing had been misleading, they were not an intentional attempt to commit fraud.

== Comments about the US State Department ==
On his The 700 Club television program, Robertson sharply criticized elements of the United States government and "special interest" groups that did not share his views. In October 2003 interviews with author Joel Mowbray about his book Dangerous Diplomacy, a book critical of the United States Department of State, Robertson made suggestions that the explosion of a nuclear weapon at State Department Headquarters would be good for the country, and repeated those comments on the air. "What we need is for somebody to place a small nuke at Foggy Bottom."

== Iraq War ==
Robertson claimed in 2004 that President George W. Bush told him, before he led the United States into the Iraq War, that he expected there to be no casualties. He made this claim in an interview with CNN, on October 19, 2004. President Bush's then-press secretary Scott McClellan denied the allegation. Mike McCurry, press secretary for Democratic Senator John Kerry of Massachusetts, who was Bush's opponent for the presidency in the 2004 election, said that Bush deserved the benefit of the doubt, but he should say whether or not Robertson was telling the truth or lying.

== Venezuela ==
=== Comments about assassinating Hugo Chávez ===
On the August 22, 2005, broadcast of The 700 Club, Robertson said the following about Venezuelan President Hugo Chávez:

I don't know about this doctrine of assassination, but if he thinks we're trying to assassinate him, I think that we really ought to go ahead and do it. It's a whole lot cheaper than starting a war, and I don't think any oil shipments will stop.

The remarks which Robertson made against Chavez were criticized worldwide, effectively resulting in Robertson's later retraction of those statements on live television.

Robertson also said that Chávez was "going to make Venezuela a launching pad for communist infiltration and Muslim extremism all over the continent" and he also called the Venezuelan leader an "out-of-control dictator [...] a dangerous enemy to our south, controlling a huge pool of oil that could hurt us very badly."

Assassinations of heads of state have been against U.S. policy since an executive order against them was issued in 1976; in response, Defense Secretary Donald Rumsfeld said that "our department doesn't do that kind of thing." Bernardo Álvarez Herrera, Venezuela's ambassador to the U.S., demanded a stronger condemnation from the White House and that the United States "respect our country and its president".

On the August 24 edition of The 700 Club, Robertson asserted that he had not actually called for Chávez's assassination, but that there were other ways of "taking him out", such as having special forces carry out a kidnapping. Robertson explicitly denied having used the word 'assassination', though the word 'assassinate' was present in his initial statement. Later that day, he issued a written statement in which he said, "Is it right to call for assassination? No, and I apologize for that statement. I spoke in frustration that we should accommodate the man who thinks the U.S. is out to kill him". However, he continued to justify his original stance on the potential threat Chávez posed to U.S. interests, even reiterating his support for Chavez's assassination on the February 2, 2006, edition of Hannity and Colmes, replying "[N]ot now, but one day, one day, one day," when asked whether Robertson wanted Chavez taken out.

On Sunday, August 28, 2005, Chávez called on the U.S. Justice Department to investigate the matter: "My government is going to take legal action in the United States," he said in a televised speech. "If the U.S. government does not take the necessary steps, we will denounce the U.S. government at the United Nations and the Organization of American States".

=== Comments about assassinating Nicolas Maduro ===
On April 4, 2019, amidst the Venezuelan presidential crisis, Robertson called for the assassination of Nicolás Maduro. Robertson called for the United States to take out Maduro with a "hellfire missile" strike. Maduro survived a drone attack in 2018. Robertson's remark occurred 14 years after Robertson called for the assassination of Chavez.

== Attributing a statement to Barry W. Lynn ==
On the November 5, 2005, airing of The 700 Club, Robertson claimed that Reverend Barry W. Lynn, the director of Americans United for Separation of Church and State, said that "if a church is burning down, the local community could not send the fire engine to put the fire out because that would violate, quote, separation of church and state". Rev. Lynn responded, denying the allegation and saying "I've seen [Robertson] take pot shots at me with information I have repeatedly told them is not true. Robertson, for example, continues to tell national television audiences that I believe that a public fire department can't go to a burning church without violating the separation of church and state. He apparently uses this "anecdote" to demonstrate my radical, wacky beliefs. Trouble is (for him), I never said it and don't believe it." Robertson also drew criticism from Focus on the Family for the statement in their magazine, Citizen, saying that "One Christian conservative leader [presumably Robertson] has mistakenly suggested that Lynn would say a burning church shouldn't be able to call the fire department lest it violate the bounds of church-state separation."

== Comments about Dover, Pennsylvania ==
On his November 10, 2005, broadcast of The 700 Club, Robertson told citizens of Dover, Pennsylvania that they had rejected God by voting out of office all seven members of the school board who support intelligent design.

"I'd like to say to the good citizens of Dover: if there is a disaster in your area, don't turn to God, you just rejected him from your city", Robertson said on his broadcast.

"And don't wonder why he hasn't helped you when problems begin, if they begin. I'm not saying they will, but if they do, just remember, you just voted God out of your city. And if that's the case, don't ask for his help because he might not be there."

In a written statement, Robertson later clarified his comments:

"God is tolerant and loving, but we can't keep sticking our finger in his eye forever. If they have future problems in Dover, I recommend they call on Charles Darwin. Maybe he can help them."

== Comments about Ariel Sharon's health ==
The lead story on the January 5, 2006, edition of The 700 Club was Israeli Prime Minister Ariel Sharon's hospitalization for a severe stroke. After the story, Robertson said that Sharon's illness was possibly retribution from God for his recent drive to give more land to the Palestinians. He also claimed former prime minister Yitzhak Rabin's 1995 assassination may have occurred for the same reason.

The remarks drew criticism from all sides, even from other evangelicals. For instance, Richard Land, president of the Southern Baptist Convention's Ethics and Religious Liberty Commission, said that Robertson "ought to know better" than to say such things. He added, "...the arrogance of the statement shocks me almost as much as the insensitivity of it." Ted Haggard, then president of the National Association of Evangelicals, said that "any doctor could have predicted (Sharon's) going to have health problems" and that his illness was medical, not divine retribution. The White House called Robertson's statement "wholly inappropriate and offensive". Robertson was also chastised by Israeli officials and members of the Anti-Defamation League.

On January 11, Israel responded by announcing that Robertson would be banned from involvement in a project to build a Christian tourist attraction and pilgrimage site near the Sea of Galilee known as the Christian Heritage Center. The plan had called for Israel leasing 35 acres (140,000 m^{2}) of land to a group of evangelicals (including Robertson) for free to create several tourist attractions and pilgrimage sites in exchange for the evangelicals raising 50 million dollars in funding. A spokesman for the Tourism Ministry commented, "We cannot accept these statements, and we will not sign any contracts with Mr. Robertson."

He added that the decision would not apply to all members of the evangelical community: "We want to see who in the group supports his (Robertson's) statements. Those who support the statements cannot do business with us. Those that publicly support Ariel Sharon's recovery ... are welcome to do business with us."

On January 12, Robertson sent a letter to Sharon's son Omri, apologizing for his comments. In the letter, Robertson called Ariel Sharon a "kind, gracious and gentle man" who was "carrying an almost insurmountable burden of making decisions for his nation". He added that his "concern for the future safety of your nation led me to make remarks which I can now view in retrospect as inappropriate and insensitive in light of a national grief experienced because of your father's illness ... I ask your forgiveness and the forgiveness of the people of Israel." Omri and the Israeli government accepted the apology, though it remained unclear whether the deal with Robertson would be rehabilitated.

While some observers were satisfied by the gesture, some reporters also accused Robertson of using the apology as a tactic allowing him to make such statements while promoting a public image among evangelicals as a leader who does not compromise on his values. Surprisingly, some of the harsher criticism of Robertson did not come from American or Israeli Jews, but from his fellow evangelicals and conservative Christians, who charged that Robertson's behavior did serious harm to evangelicals' image, and led to unfair generalizations and criticism of them.

The fallout from Robertson's comments was still visible over a month after the event; after speaking with organizers of the National Religious Broadcasters February 2006 convention, Robertson wound up cancelling his planned keynote speech.

A representative from Israel's Tourism Ministry diplomatically commented, "Pat Robertson has been a long-term friend of the state of Israel, and continues to be so."

In March 2006, Robertson lost a bid for re-election to the board of directors of the National Religious Broadcasters.

== Comments about "liberal professors" ==
On the March 21, 2006, broadcast of The 700 Club, while reviewing The Professors: The 101 Most Dangerous Academics in America by David Horowitz, the subject of which is radical academics in American universities, Robertson went on to say that the 101 professors named in the book are only but a few of "thirty to forty thousand" left-wing professors in the United States, all of whom he accused of being "racists, murderers, sexual deviants and supporters of Al-Qaeda," further labeling them as "termites that have worked into the woodwork of our academic society". Later in the broadcast, he went on to say, "these guys are out and out communists, they are radicals, they are, you know, some of them killers, and they are propagandists of the first order ... you don't want your child to be brainwashed by these radicals, you just don't want it to happen. Not only brainwashed but also beat up, they beat these people up, cower them into submission."

== Leg press claims ==
In May 2006, Robertson began claiming on his web site that through training and his "Age-Defying energy shake", he was able to leg press 2,000 lb (907 kg) while others note that he was being paid to promote a common energy formula, and this was a lie to promote sales of that product. Two thousand pounds would be an exceptional accomplishment for a world-class athlete, and Robertson was then in his seventies. For comparative purposes, when Dan Kendra set the Florida State University record of 1,335 lb (606 kg), the leg press machine required extensive modifications to hold the proper amount of weight, and the capillaries in both of Kendra's eyes burst during his successful attempt. Thus, Robertson's claimed achievement would add 665 lb (302 kg) to the best-ever total of Kendra, a top athlete in his physical prime, who later played in the National Football League and tried unsuccessfully to become a Navy SEAL.

In response to the skepticism about this claim, Robertson's website claimed that his doctor was able to leg press 2,700 lb (1,225 kg), and "It is not nearly as hard as the authors of these reports make it out to be." A video was provided supposedly demonstrating Robertson doing several reps with a weight of 1,000 lb (454 kg). In the video Robertson is seen using a 45-degree sled-type leg press machine, which reduces the effective weight to 707 lb (321 kg) (sin(45°) x 1000 lbs [454 kg]). He keeps the safety locks in place at the second step, which severely limits the range of possible motion. The seat is positioned to allow approximately 6 inches (150 mm) of travel after the lock. This setup gave Robertson the maximum mechanical advantage at the last few inches of travel. In contrast, actual leg press technique allows the weight to slide down until the hip and knee joints are at significant flexion. The video of Roberson's lift was also criticized because it did not appear to even verify his claim that he was lifting 1,000 lb (454 kg), despite the reduced range of flexion due to the machine's set-up. Mike DeBonis of Slate noted "It appears as if 16 plates are loaded on the machine. Four of them look like 100-pound [45 kg] plates, and the rest are 45s [20 kg]. That adds up to 940 pounds [425 kg]." DeBonis also noted that Robertson was using incorrect form as he "helps his legs by pushing on his knees with his arms. That's a no-no. He also achieves nowhere near the recommended full range of motion, which is to bring the knees to at least a 90-degree angle." DeBonis saw the claims made by Robertson and similar claims by Madeleine Albright (that she could press 400 lb (181 kg)) as yet another proof of the inferiority of that particular machine in comparison to the barbell squat: "Most leg press machines are constructed as either a sled angled at 45 degrees or a lever. (There are some that use cables, too.) In all cases, some of the weight gets borne by the machine. You may be loading 400 pounds [180 kg], but your muscles are feeling only 200 [90 kg]." The video was removed from the CBN website.

Robertson responded to questions concerning the lift in an interview with CBS. He maintained his claim to have done it but admitted "I didn't do it with the same form that these professional bodybuilders do, which is a full squat, and it's very difficult. But I did do it. I regularly can do 1,000 pounds [454 kg] and 1,200 pounds [544 kg]." He said he used an incline leg press and did "the full extension on that particular machine. They have a brake on it. I was told put the brake on. When the professionals do it, they take the brake off and let the weight come all the way down on them. And if you don't have a lot of help, you've got a Volkswagen sitting on your hips. I didn't do that."

In June 2006, General Nutrition Center, a nutritional supplement retailer, announced without explanation that it would stop carrying Robertson's energy drink.

== Racist comments about the Asian appearance ==
On the February 7, 2007, edition of The 700 Club, Robertson stated that people who have too much plastic surgery "got the eyes like they're Oriental" and he stretched his eyelids in a manner which is stereotypical of Asians.

== 2010 Haiti earthquake ==
On the January 13, 2010, broadcast of The 700 Club, Robertson blamed the Haitians for making a deal with the Devil during their 1791 slave rebellion, resulting in the Haiti earthquake of January 12, 2010 and other misfortunes. He told viewers of his Christian Broadcasting Network:

... something happened a long time ago in Haiti, and people might not want to talk about it, they were under the heel of the French, uh, you know, Napoleon the third and whatever, and they got together and swore a pact to the devil, they said, we will serve you, if you get us free from the French, true story. And so the devil said, 'OK, it's a deal.' And they kicked the French out, the Haitians revolted and got themselves free, and ever since they have been cursed by one thing after the other, desperately poor.

He went on to state:

That island of Hispaniola is one island. It is cut down the middle; on the one side is Haiti on the other is the Dominican Republic. Dominican Republic is prosperous, healthy, full of resorts, etc. Haiti is in desperate poverty. Same island. They need to have and we need to pray for them a great turning to God and out of this tragedy I'm optimistic something good may come. But right now we are helping the suffering people and the suffering is unimaginable.

The reference to a "pact to the devil" was later said by CBN to be a reference to the Vodou ceremony conducted by Dutty Boukman involving animal sacrifice in Bois Caïman that began the Haitian revolution. Contrary to Robertson's claims however, this ceremony and the religion of Vodou in general does not involve Satan or devil worship. Robertson mistakenly identified the French government as that of Napoleon III, as Haiti became independent (and the Revolution won) four years before Napoleon III was born. In fact, it was Napoleon Bonaparte (by far, the more famous of the two rulers), who sent a French army to try to recapture Haiti a decade after its revolution. The force was destroyed by yellow fever and the fierce resistance led by Haitian generals.

Veteran Christian radio broadcaster Michael Ireland stated that this Haitian Vodou ceremony has long been erroneously referenced by various Christian sources as the "pact with the devil" or "pact to the devil" that began the Haitian revolution. This Vodou ceremony was a ceremonial impulsion to the liberation of thousands of abjectly enslaved peoples under French, mostly Christian, tyranny: and as such has been perverted over the following decades to besmear a righteous liberty-struggle as formed of wicked means. These Christians were influenced by spiritual warfare theology and concerned that the Aristide government had made efforts to incorporate the Vodou sector more fully into the political process. These Evangelicals developed a counter-narrative to the official national story. In this narrative, the ancestral spirits at the Vodou cemetery were re-cast as demons. In their view, the engagement with demons amounted to a pact that put Haiti under the rule of Satan. While some Haitian Evangelicals subscribe to this idea, most Haitian nationalists vehemently oppose it. According to University of Gothenburg researcher Markel Thylefors, "The event of the Bois Caïman ceremony forms an important part of Haitian national identity as it relates to the very genesis of Haiti."

In his daily press briefing on January 14, 2010, White House Press Secretary Robert Gibbs said of Robertson's commentary: "It never ceases to amaze that in times of amazing human suffering somebody says something that could be so utterly stupid."

Mainline and evangelical Christian voices appeared mostly unanimous in criticizing Robertson's remarks as untrue, untimely and insensitive and the remarks sparked even further domestic and international criticism.

== Comments about marijuana laws ==
On the December 16, 2010, broadcast of The 700 Club, Pat Robertson condemned harsh sentences for people who are convicted of possession of cannabis. Robertson stated, "We're locking up people that take a couple of puffs of marijuana, and the next thing you know they've got 10 years." He went on to say, "I'm not exactly for the use of drugs – don't get me wrong – but I just believe that criminalizing marijuana, criminalizing the possession of a few ounces of pot and that kind of thing, I mean, it's just costing us a fortune and it's ruining young people."

Robertson's remarks were applauded by the National Organization for the Reform of Marijuana Laws and the Drug Policy Alliance. Executive Director of the Drug Policy Alliance Ethan Nadelmann said, "The people who are listening to him may roll their eyes when the Democrats say this, but when Pat Robertson says this he has credibility in the faith community."

Appearing on Good Morning America, Vice President Joe Biden condemned Robertson's commentary, saying, "I still believe it's a gateway drug. I've spent a lot of my life as chairman of the Judiciary Committee dealing with this. I think it would be a mistake to legalize."

== Comments in which he advocated divorce ==
On the September 14, 2011, broadcast of The 700 Club, a viewer talked about a friend who was bitter at God because his wife had Alzheimer's disease, and the friend had started seeing another woman. The viewer asked Robertson for his advice. Robertson responded, "I know it sounds cruel, but if he's going to do something, he should divorce her and start all over again, but make sure she has custodial care and somebody looking after her." He continued saying, "If you respect that vow, you say 'til death do us part. This is a kind of death."

In response, Russell D. Moore, Dean of the School of Theology at the Southern Baptist Theological Seminary, wrote that Robertson's comments were "a repudiation of the gospel of Jesus Christ" and he also wrote that "Pat Robertson's cruel marriage statement is no anomaly. He and his cohorts have given us for years a prosperity gospel with more in common with an Asherah pole than a cross."

Following a backlash over Robertson's advice, Robertson said, "Basically I'm saying, adultery is not a good thing and you might as well straighten your life out and the only way to do it is to kind of get your affair with your wife in order. ... I was not giving advice to the whole world and nor was I counseling anybody to be unscriptural and leave their spouse. ... Please know that I believe the Bible. Please know that I never would tell anybody to leave their sick spouse. I never never would say such a thing because I need my spouse when I get sick and she needs me when she gets sick. In sickness and in health, I believe it!"

== Comments about spousal abuse ==
Robertson was criticized in September 2012 after a man named Michael called The 700 Club and asked for advice on what to do about his wife not respecting him. Robertson called the woman a "rebellious child" who did not want to "submit to any authority". He jokingly suggested that Michael become a Muslim and move to Saudi Arabia where he could beat her. Critics observed that Robertson's comments about wife-beating were edited out of the episode when it appeared on the Christian Broadcasting Network.

== Comments about Young Earth creationism ==
In November 2012, a viewer of The 700 Club wrote that one of her biggest fears was that her children and her husband would not go to heaven "because they question why the Bible could not explain the existence of dinosaurs."

Before he answered the question, Robertson acknowledged the fact that the statement was controversial by saying, "I know that people will probably try to lynch me when I say this." He then replied: "You go back in time, you've got radiocarbon dating. You got all these things, and you've got the carcasses of dinosaurs frozen in time out in the Dakotas. They're out there. So, there was a time when these giant reptiles were on the Earth, and it was before the time of the Bible. So, don't try and cover it up and make like everything was 6,000 years. That's not the Bible. If you fight science, you're going to lose your children, and I believe in telling them the way it was."

Young Earth creationist and director of Answers in Genesis, Ken Ham responded to Robertson's commentary by saying: "Not only do we have to work hard to not let our kids be led astray by the anti-God teaching of the secularists, we have to work hard to not let them be led astray by compromising church leaders like Pat Robertson. Pat Robertson gives more fodder to our enemies." Ham said, referring to secularists and atheists who applauded Robertson online for his statements. He went on to say that, "Such leaders — including Pat Robertson — have a lot to answer to the Lord for one day, such leaders are guilty of putting stumbling blocks in the way of kids and adults in regards to believing God's word and the Gospel."

In May 2014, Robertson responded to a caller regarding the age of the Earth: "You have to be deaf, dumb and blind to think that this Earth that we live in only has 6,000 years of existence, it just doesn't, I'm sorry ... To deny the clear record that's there before us makes us looks silly ... There's no way that all this that you have here took place in 6,000 years, it just couldn't have been done, couldn't possibly have been done."

Once again, Ham vociferously criticized Robertson's remarks by saying: "Pat Robertson illustrates one of the biggest problems we have today in the church-people like Robertson compromise the Word of God with the pagan ideas of fallible men!" Ham went on to say: "Pat Robertson is not upholding the Word of God with his ridiculous statements -- he is undermining the authority of the Word."

== Comments about AIDS ==
On the August 27, 2013, episode of The 700 Club, Robertson said that members of the San Francisco gay community would deliberately infect people with AIDS by cutting them with a sharp, infected ring while they were shaking their hands. The comment was edited out when the clip was posted online, but as of September 5, 2013, the video was available on other outlets. He also said that the homosexual community had put laws on the books prohibiting people from mentioning their HIV status.

During the October 16, 2014, episode of The 700 Club, a viewer sent in an email saying she had been called by God to go on a mission trip to Kenya but friends and family had expressed fears that she could catch Ebola in Kenya. In his answer, Robertson pointed out that there was not currently an outbreak of Ebola in Kenya, but warned of the risk of AIDS, stating: "You might get AIDS in Kenya, people have AIDS, you've got to be careful. I mean, the towels could have AIDS." Health experts subsequently stated that towels cannot have AIDS. The comment angered viewers in Kenya who took to Twitter to express their disapproval using the hashtag #someonetellPatRobertson. The show later apologized.

== Comments about US-Saudi Arabia relations after the death of Jamal Khashoggi ==
Robertson received criticism after stating that "we've got an arms deal that everybody wanted a piece of ... it'll be a lot of jobs, a lot of money come to our coffers. It's not something you want to blow up willy-nilly" in the wake of the murder of Jamal Khashoggi.

== Comments about critical race theory ==
On June 25, 2021, Robertson sparked controversy after he said that critical race theory is a "monstrous evil". He also said that it gives people of color "the whip handle" over white people. Several people questioned and condemned Robertson's remarks. Former Colorado House Speaker Terrance Carroll said that he was disappointed by Robertson's remarks.

== Comments about mass shootings ==
The day after the Wisconsin Sikh temple shooting, Robertson claimed that the shooting was caused by atheists and "people who hate God", garnering controversy because some people considered his comments about atheists inflammatory.

Robertson also garnered controversy after he blamed the 2017 Las Vegas shooting on disrespect for then-president Donald Trump, as well as NFL players who were taking the knee during the singing of the National Anthem.

== Comments about the Russian invasion of Ukraine ==
On February 28, 2022, Robertson sparked controversy after he stated that Russian President Vladimir Putin was "compelled by God" to invade Ukraine in fulfillment of the "end times prophecy" in Israel. His claims have been described as having a "lack of evidence" to support them. On March 16, 2022, Robertson called for President Joe Biden to take an aggressive stance towards Russia, including a call to launch nuclear weapons against them.

== Bibliography ==
- Randi, James (1989), The Faith Healers, Prometheus Books, ISBN 978-0-87975-535-5
