= 2010 Haiti earthquake conspiracy theories =

Conspiracy theories regarding the 2010 Haiti earthquake are covered at:

- Pat Robertson controversies#2010 Haiti earthquake
- Antisemitic trope#Haiti
- High-frequency Active Auroral Research Program#Conspiracy theories
