= The New World Order (Robertson book) =

Book by Pat Robertson

- Author: Pat Robertson
- Language: English
- Subject: Religion, politics and state
- Genre: Religion
- Publisher: Thomas Nelson, Incorporated
- Publication date: 1991
- Publication place: United States
- Media type: Print (hardcover)
- Pages: 319
- ISBN: 9780849909153
- LC Class: D860.R64 1991

The New World Order is a book authored by Pat Robertson, published in 1991 by Word Publishing. In the book, Robertson purports to expose a behind-the-scenes Establishment with enormous power controlling American policy, whose "principal goal is the establishment of a one-world government where the control of money is in the hands of one or more privately owned but government-chartered central banks." This conspiracy includes such elements as the Illuminati, the New Age movement, the Freemasons, the Council on Foreign Relations, the United Nations, and the Trilateral Commission. Robertson further claims that the rise of this one-world conspiracy is being guided by Satan to fulfill the predictions of premillennial Christian eschatology, viewing it as a sign that the end times are nearing.

Indeed, it may well be that men of goodwill like Woodrow Wilson, Jimmy Carter, and George Bush, who sincerely want a larger community of nations living at peace in our world, are in reality unknowingly and unwittingly carrying out the mission and mouthing the phrases of a tightly knit cabal whose goal is nothing less than a new order for the human race under the domination of Lucifer and his followers.

The book reached the New York Times Best Seller List and was "heavily promoted" by Robertson's Christian Coalition.

Political science professor Martha F. Lee has referred to the book as the "most influential appearance" of prominent conspiracy theorist Nesta Webster's theories regarding the Illuminati. Political scientist Michael Barkun also called The New World Order the most influential work on the Illuminati in recent years. The book, along with an earlier countercultural focus on the Illuminati and the John Birch Society's promotion of global elite conspiracies, also "cemented the [New World Order] theory as a cornerstone within America’s conspiratorial culture."

== Reviews ==
The book made the news in 1995 when its potential anti-Semitic bias was critiqued in The New York Review of Books, which stated, "Not since Father Coughlin or Henry Ford has a prominent white American so boldly and unapologetically blamed the disasters of modern world history on the machinations of international high finance in general and on a few influential Jews in particular." The Anti-Defamation League then requested Robertson to denounce the concept of a "worldwide Jewish conspiracy", to which Robertson responded in a statement to the New York Times, "I deeply regret that anyone in the Jewish community believes that my description of international bankers and use of the phrase 'European bankers' in my book refers to Jews".

In a critical review of the book for The Christian Century, Ephraim Radner wrote, "Lind and Heilbrun show how Robertson took over—in some cases word for word—well-worn theories of a Jewish conspiracy. In particular, Robertson relied on the work of Nesta Webster and Eustace Mullins."

Historian Nicole Hemmer stated that Robertson's work "covered every internationalist conspiracy imaginable." Similarly, it was described as a "catch all for conspiracy theories" by the Christian academic Don Wilkey: "Pat says a conspiracy has existed in the world working through Freemasonry and a secret Order of the Illuminati, a group combining Masons and Jewish Bankers."

== See also ==
- New world order (politics)
- Pat Robertson controversies
