= Future Eyes =

Studio album by Sheila Walsh
- Released: 1981
- Recorded: 1981
- Genre: Rock/Gospel
- Label: Chapel Lane CLS 8006; Sparrow Records SPR 1057
- Producer: Paul Cobbold

Sheila Walsh chronology
Future Eyes (1982)	No One Loves Me Like You (1982)

Future Eyes is the title of the first solo album by the Scottish singer Sheila Walsh. It was recorded in Spring 1981 at Chapel Lane Studios near Hereford, engineered and produced by Paul Cobbold. It was released in the UK in 1981 on Chapel Lane Records. Sparrow Records released a slightly modified version for the North American market in 1982. Several tracks were remixed by adding more guitar, removing some synthesizers, and adding some different background vocals. "Breaking the Ice" and "He Weeps for Our Tears" were removed while "Burn On" was added. The track order was also changed. Larry Norman was given producer credits on the Sparrow release for his remixing and editing work on "Love in My Life" and "You're so Important to Me".

== Chapel Lane release (1981) ==
Adapted from the album's liner notes.

Side one

1. "Here With Me" (Graham Kendrick, Chris Rolinson)
2. "You're so Important to Me" (John Daniels)
3. "Eyes of a Different Kind" (Graham Kendrick)
4. "Love in My Life" (Derek Goudie, Chris Rolinson)
5. "He Weeps for Our Tears" (Mark Williamson, Phil Thomson)

Side two

1. "Future Eyes" (Graham Kendrick)
2. "Fear of Silence" (Graham Kendrick, Chris Rolinson)
3. "Back Into the Old Routine" (Graham Kendrick)
4. "Breaking the Ice" (Graham Kendrick)
5. "Mona Lisa" (Graham Kendrick)

== Sparrow release (1982) ==
Adapted from the album's liner notes.

Side one

1. "Here With Me" (Graham Kendrick, Chris Rolinson)
2. "Burn On" (Graham Kendrick)
3. "Love in My Life" (Derek Goudie, Chris Rolinson)
4. "Eyes of a Different Kind" (Graham Kendrick)

Side two

1. "You're so Important to Me" (John Daniels)
2. "Future Eyes" (Graham Kendrick)
3. "Fear of Silence" (Graham Kendrick, Chris Rolinson)
4. "Back Into the Old Routine" (Graham Kendrick)
5. "Mona Lisa" (Graham Kendrick)

== Personnel ==
Adapted from the album's liner notes.

- Sheila Walsh – vocals
- Chris Rolinson – keyboards, piano, arrangements
- Ray Goudie – drums
- Ralph Bollard – bass (a "nom de plume" for Producer Paul Cobbold)
- Rob Marshall – guitar
- Colin Vallance – bass
- Norman Barratt – guitar
- Dave Morris – piano and keyboards
- B Askey – strings
- G York – strings
- D Haime – strings
- CW Green – strings
- Pete Brooks – guitar
- Dave Charles – drums
- Dave Bollard – bass (a "nom de plume" for producer Paul Cobbold)
- Dave Kasak – guitar

Personnel additions to Sparrow release

- Larry Norman – harmonies
- Sarah Finch – harmonies
- Mark Williamson – bass

Production

- Paul Cobbold – producer, engineer at Chapel Lane Studios, Hereford
- Ray Goudie – executive producer
