= Ben Kinchlow =

American television evangelist (1936–2019)

The Reverend Ben Kinchlow
- Born: Harvey Ben Kinchlow; December 27, 1936; Uvalde, Texas, US
- Died: July 18, 2019 (aged 82); Virginia Beach, Virginia, US
- Resting place: Albert G. Horton Jr. Memorial Veterans Cemetery, Suffolk, Virginia
- Occupations: Christian evangelist, television/radio talk show host, author
- Years active: 1971–2019
- Notable work: The 700 Club
- Political party: Republican
- Spouse: Vivian Carolyn Jordan (m. 1959; died 2014)
- Children: 3
- Military career
- Allegiance: United States
- Branch: United States Air Force
- Rank: Staff sergeant
- Conflicts: Vietnam War

Harvey Ben Kinchlow (December 27, 1936 – July 18, 2019) was an American evangelist who co-hosted The 700 Club from 1975 to 1988 and again from 1992 to 1996. He also hosted other shows on the Christian Broadcasting Network such as Straight Talk and a radio talk show, Taking It to the Streets.

== Early life and education ==
Ben Kinchlow was born and raised in Uvalde, Texas, the son of a Methodist minister. Kinchlow received his elementary and secondary education during the 1940s in what was then the Nicolas School, a tiny building which was located in the center of East Uvalde city park, which was the last segregated campus for the city's black students, operating exclusively for Blacks from 1938 until 1955. He served in the United States Air Force for thirteen years and was a veteran of the Vietnam War.

He rediscovered Christianity in the 1970s after a period as a Black Nationalist influenced by Malcolm X and the Black Muslims. He earned his MBA, later becoming a born-again Christian. Soon thereafter, in 1971, he was ordained as an African Methodist Episcopal Church minister.

== Career ==
Kinchlow became the executive director of a Christian drug and rehabilitation center and appeared as a guest on The 700 Club in 1971 in order to speak about the people he saw coming to Christ through the center. He was asked back to host the show while Pat Robertson was in Israel, and in 1975 he became The 700 Club's director of counseling. In 1982, he became 700 Club co-host and Christian Broadcasting Network vice-president for domestic ministries, in 1985, he was promoted to executive vice-president. He left CBN and The 700 Club in 1996 to pursue an independent ministry.

Kinchlow was the founder of Americans for Israel and the co-host of the Front Page Jerusalem radio show.

Kinchlow was president and co-founder of Brio TV which launched in 2015 as a subscription-based streaming service with television affiliates focused on providing positive, faith-driven content for individuals and families. He hosted the platform's flagship program Ben Kinchlow's Real America.

He was also a commentary contributor to WorldNetDaily, a conservative news website.

== Personal life and death ==
Kinchlow was married to Vivian Carolyn Jordan Kinchlow from 1959 until her death in 2014. They had three sons.

Kinchlow died on Thursday, July 18, 2019, at the age of 82. Followers of Kinchlow's official Facebook page received a "prayer alert asking for emergency prayers" the day before, though the reason for the request, as well as the official cause of death was not publicly disclosed in the media, however he had been suffering from COPD, congestive heart failure and kidney disease at the time of his death.

Following a funeral service held in the chapel of Regent University, Kinchlow was buried in the Albert G. Horton Jr. Memorial Veterans Cemetery in Suffolk, Virginia.
