= Sheila Walsh (singer) =

Scottish singer, author and presenter

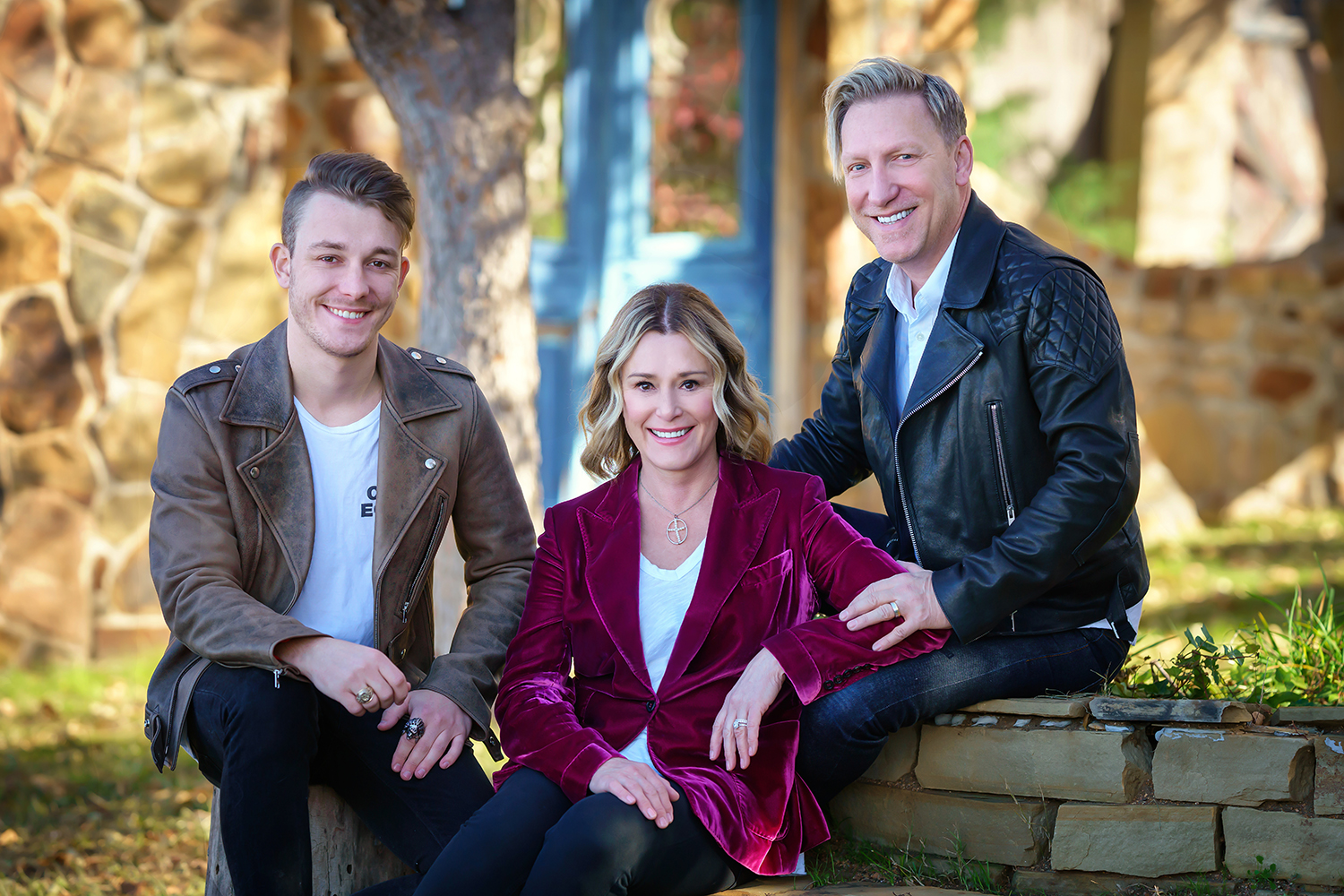
- Walsh with her son and husband

Background information
- Born: 5 July 1956 (age 69); Ayr, Scotland
- Origin: Glasgow, Scotland
- Genres: Gospel, contemporary Christian
- Occupations: Evangelist; vocalist; songwriter; author; inspirational speaker; talk-show; host
- Instrument: Soprano
- Years active: 1978–present
- Labels: Chapel Lane; Kingsway; Star Song; Sparrow; Word; A&M; Sony Wonder; Integrity; Women of Faith; Venture3Media
- Spouse: Barry Walsh (m. 1994)
- Website: www.sheilawalsh.com

Sheila Walsh (born 5 July 1956) is a Scottish-born American contemporary Christian vocalist, songwriter, evangelist, author, inspirational speaker, and talk-show host.

== Life and career ==
Walsh was born in Ayr, Scotland, and began her career as a contemporary Christian singer after studying theology at London Bible College (now the London School of Theology) in 1979 and music at the London Academy of Operatic Art. Walsh worked as an evangelist with the British chapter of Youth For Christ and sang with a group known as "The Oasis" until going solo in 1981. She also worked closely at this time with keyboard player Chris Rolinson, who contributed extensively to the sound of her first "new wave" style album, Future Eyes. He also worked with her on her first United States tour, where she opened for Phil Keaggy. As Walsh enjoyed some success both in the United Kingdom and America as a CCM musician, she was asked by minister Pat Robertson to serve as a co-host of his television talk-show, The 700 Club in 1987. Walsh served in this capacity into 1992 and also hosted her own talk show, Heart to Heart with Sheila Walsh.

Walsh's differences in outlook with Pat Robertson and general feelings of depression prompted her to consider her life's direction. After leaving Pat Robertson's enterprises in 1992 she sought therapy for her depression, eventually returning to college at Fuller Theological Seminary in California to embark upon doctoral studies in theology. Pat Robertson explained her departure from CBN as the result of a "nervous breakdown" brought on by the tremendous demands of her work with CBN. He asked his viewers to keep her in their prayers and ask God to give her the strength to continue doing His work.

Walsh went on to write a book exploring her struggle with depression and her experiences with her faith as a Christian, entitled Honestly. While Walsh had previously written several books on theology, this autobiography would become the wellspring of her later work on personal aspects of faith and would set the tone for her introspective, personal, but evangelical approach to affairs of modern theology.

Over the course of the later 1990s, Walsh's work concerned women's issues within the church and the relationship of the contemporary woman with God. She has written over seventeen books including Honestly, Living Fearlessly, and Life is Tough, but God is Faithful. She has also written several books for children recently. In addition, Walsh has continued her musical career as a songwriter and singer, recording several albums of new Christian music and traditional hymns arranged to a Celtic sound.

In 2005, Walsh partnered with Tommy Nelson publishers to create the Gigi, God's Little Princess line of children's books and DVDs.

Walsh, with her family, is now an active attendee of Prestonwood Baptist Church, in Plano, Texas.

As of 2007, Walsh has appeared on many TV programs such as: Life Today, Hour of Power and The Rock Gospel Show (BBC) among many others. She was a member of the team "Women of Faith" with Kari Jobe on the second season of The American Bible Challenge on GSN. Their charity was The A21 Campaign, an anti-trafficking organization that aims to abolish slavery.

== Discography ==
=== Albums ===
- Future Eyes (1981)
- No One Loves Me Like You (1982)
- War of Love (1983) released in the UK as Drifting with slightly different track listing - Best Female Gospel Performance nominee, 26th Annual Grammy awards
- Triumph in the Air (1984)
- Don't Hide Your Heart (1985) Best Female Gospel Performance nominee, 28th Annual Grammy awards
- Portrait (Compilation album) (1986) reissued in 1988 on CD as Compact Favorites
- Shadowlands (1986) Best Female Gospel Performance nominee, 29th Annual Grammy awards
- Say So (1988)
- Simple Truth (1989)
- Hymns and Voices (1990) reissued in 2002, with bonus tracks, as The Hymns Collection
- For a Time Like This (1991)
- Hope (1998)
- Blue Waters (2000)
- Peace: A Celtic Christmas (2000)
- Love Falls Down (2001)
- All That Really Matters (2003)
- Celtic Lullabies and Gentle Worship (2003)
- The Best of Sheila Walsh (compilation album) (2004)
- You Raise Me Up (2005)
- Celtic Worship (2006)
- Find Your Wings (2007)
- Heart Wide Open (2008)
- Let Go (2009)
- God's Little Princess Lullabies (2009)
- I Hear Angels (2010)
- Beauty From Ashes (2012)
- Braveheart Worship (2020)

=== Singles ===
- "Here With Me"/"Burn On" (1980)
- "Star Song"/"Burn On" (1981)
- "Burn On"/"You’re So Important To Me" (1982)
- "Drifting" (duet with Cliff Richard) - UK No. 64/"Lonely When the Lights Go On" (1983)
- "Turn, Turn, Turn"/"Sleepwalking" (1983)
- "Growing Up to Be a Child"/"Private Life" (1984)
- "His Eyes"/"He Moved a Mountain" (1984)
- "Surrendering"/"Don't Turn Your Back On Jesus" (1984)
- "Jesus Call Your Lambs" (duet with Cliff Richard)/"We're All One" (1985)
- "Christian"/"Sand in the Hand" (1986)
- "What Do You Know (That I Don't)"/"Never Give It Up" (1986)
- "I Hope and I Pray"/"Speak of Love" (both duets with Alvin Stardust) (1986)
- "Trapeze"/"Surrender" (1987)
- "Angles With Dirty Faces"/"Hope for the Hopeless" (1988)
- "I Will Run to You" (2001)
- "Time For You to Fly" (2001)
- "Beneath the Waters I Will Rise" (2012)

=== Compilation albums ===
- Sparrow Spotlight Sampler Various Artists (Mystery) 1983
- Look Who Loves You Now Michele Pillar (duet on To Worship You) 1984
- Do Something Now The CAUSE Various Artists 1985
- Fight The Fight: Rescue The Unborn Various Artists 1985
- Limelight Steve Taylor (duet on Not Gonna Fall Away) 1986
- Transatlantic Remixes Steve Taylor & Sheila Walsh (Not Gonna Fall Away duet with Steve Taylor & We're All One) 1986
- Sounds of the Summer Vol. 1 Various Artists (We're All One Extended Remix Version) 1986
- Take 'Em With You 3 Various Artists (Big Boy Now) 1986
- Wired for Sound Various Artists (Big Boy Now) 1987
- Shake: Christian Artists Face The Music (Interview & tracks from the album "Say So") 1988
- Soaring Volume II
- Adventures in the Land of Big Beats & Happy Feets Various Artists (Ship of Love Remixed) 1989
- 25 Songs of Christmas Various Artists (Star Song) 1989
- 25 Songs of Christmas Volume 2 Various Artists (Season to Rejoice) 1989
- The Myrrh Radio Collection Volume 3 Various Artists (God Loves You) 1989
- Handel's Young Messiah Various Artists (duet with Russ Taff on He Shall Feed His Flock) 1990
- Micah's Christmas Treasure (The Treasure Is Mine) (No Soundtrack available) 1994
- 26 All Time Classic Hymns Various Artists (How Great Thou Art) 1996
- Women of Faith Joy Various Artists (Saviour Like a Shepherd) 1998
- Women of Faith Overwhelming Joy Various Artists (Hope) 1999
- Women of Faith Outrageous Joy Women of Faith Worship Team (Intro for & song Savior Of My Heart Live) 1998
- Women of Faith Extravagant Grace Women of Faith Worship Team (O the Passion) 2000
- Covenant Christmas Praise Various Artists (O Come, O Come Emmanuel) 2002
- Living Waters: Haven Various Artists (After All) 2002
- Living Waters: Solitude Various Artists (Throne Of Grace) 2002
- Women of Faith The Artist Collection Various Artists (You Are Beautiful) 2003
- For Such A Time As This Various Artists (The Blessings Flow) 2005
- Platinum Series: The Best of Celtic Worship Various Artists (O the Passion) 2006
- Created to Worship Live @ Malone University Circle of Friends (Let Go Radio Special) 2010
- Women of Faith Hope and Grace Various Artists (Amazing Grace) 2010
- The Best Celtic Worship Album In The World...Ever! Various Artists (You Raise Me Up) 2012

== Publications ==
- God Put a Fighter In Me (1985) - re-published as Never Give It Up (1986)
- Holding on to Heaven With Hell on Your Back (1990)
- Sparks In the Dark (1993) Devotional
- Honestly (1996)
- Gifts for Your Soul (1997) Devotional
- Bring Back The Joy (1998)
- Faith Hope Love (1998) Gift Book
- Life Is Tough But God Is Faithful (1999)
- Stones From the River of Mercy (2000)
- Stories From the River of Mercy (2000) - re-published as Unexpected Grace (2002)
- Living Fearlessly (2001)
- The Best Devotions by Sheila Walsh (2001)
- A Love So Big (2002)
- All That Really Matters (2003)
- The Heartache No One Sees (2004)
- Outrageous Love (2004) Gift Book
- Extraordinary Faith (2005)
- Come As You Are (2005) Gift Book
- I'm Not Wonder Woman, But God Made Me Wonderful (2006)
- God Has a Dream for Your Life (2006)
- Embracing God's Design for Your Life: Women of Faith Study Guide Series (2007)
- Get Off Your Knees and Pray (2008)
- Let Go (2009)
- Beautiful Things Happen When a Woman Trusts God (2010)
- Angel Song (2010) Novel
- Good Morning, Lord: I Don't Know Where You're Going Today But I'm Going with You (2010) Devotional
- The Shelter of God's Promises (2011)
- Sweet Sanctuary (2011) Novel
- God's Shelter for Your Storm (2011) Devotional
- God Loves Broken People (2012)
- Song of the Brokenhearted (2012) Novel
- The Storm Inside(2014)
- Loved Back to Life (2015) Autobiography
- Meet My Best Friend (2015) Children's
- 5 Minutes with Jesus (2015) Devotional
- "In the Middle of the Mess: Strength for This Beautiful, Broken Life" (2017)
- "It’s Okay Not to Be Okay: Moving Forward One Day at a Time" (2018)
- "Praying Women – How to Pray When You Don`t Know What to Say" (2020)
- "Holding on When You Want to Let Go: Clinging to Hope When Life Is Falling Apart" (2021)
- "The Hope of Heaven: How the Promise of Eternity Changes Everything" (2024)

== Video collections ==
- A Sparrow Double Play (Sheila Walsh-Mystery & Steve Taylor-Meltdown) 1983
- The Cause: Do Something Now 1985
- Shadowlands: In Concert Live In London 1986
- Fight the Fight: Rescue the Unborn 1986
- Simple Truth Videos 1990
- Handel's Young Messiah (duet with Russ Taff on He Shall Feed His Flock) 1990
- Hymns & Voices 1990
- Pop Volume 4 (Big Boy Now Music Video) 1992
- Sheila Walsh Live: Finding Hope in the Mist of Disappointment 1999
- Live in Concert: An Evening with Sheila Walsh 2002
