= Dede Robertson =

Evangelical Christian activist (1927–2022)

- Born: Adelia Elmer; December 3, 1927; Columbus, Ohio, U.S.
- Died: April 19, 2022 (aged 94)
- Education: Yale University; Ohio State University
- Occupations: Author; nurse; activist
- Spouse: Pat Robertson (m. 1954)
- Parents: Ralph Elmer (father); Florence Elmer (mother)

Adelia Robertson (née Elmer; December 3, 1927 – April 19, 2022) was an American author, nurse, and evangelical Christian activist. She was the wife of Christian evangelical televangelist Pat Robertson.

== Biography ==
Adelia Elmer was born in Columbus, Ohio, to Catholic parents, Ralph and Florence Elmer.

Elmer, a fashion model and contestant in the Miss Ohio contest, was studying for her Master's in Nursing at Yale University when she met Robertson. She had earlier graduated from Ohio State University with a bachelor's degree in Social Administration.

She married Pat Robertson in 1954. She published two books, including My God Will Supply (1979) and The New You (1984), the latter about healthy living.

Robertson served as secretary and member of the Board of Directors for CBN since 1960, and on the Board of Trustees at Regent University. She was the principal United States delegate to the Inter-American Commission of Women from 1982 to 1990.
