= Chuck Holton =

War correspondent and author

Charles Holton
- Born: 1969 (age 56–57); Carson City, Nevada
- Military career
- Allegiance: United States
- Branch: United States Army
- Service years: 1987–1995
- Rank: Sergeant
- Nickname: Chuck
- Units: 75th Ranger Regiment, 147th Aviation Regiment (United States)
- Conflicts: United States invasion of Panama; Persian Gulf War
- Other work: Author, war correspondent, television producer

Chuck Holton (born 1969) is an American war correspondent, author, and motivational speaker. He has also been a freelance cameraman for Fox News, following Oliver North on his travels. Holton is currently a War Correspondent for Newsmax and The Christian Broadcasting Network.

== Early life and military career ==
Holton was born in 1969 in Carson City, Nevada. At age 17 Holton joined the United States Army, shipping off to basic training at Fort Benning, Georgia. Holton is a graduate of both Airborne School and Ranger School, graduating Ranger class 3-89. Holton went on to attend Jumpmaster School, Nuclear, Biological and Chemical Warfare School and Assault Climber school, and was later an instructor at the United States Military Academy at Camp Buckner. Holton was deployed to Panama for Operation Just Cause, where he served as a team leader during which (as he recounts in his book A More Elite Soldier) his best friend in the army at the time; Specialist Philip Lear, was killed in action. He served four years with the 75th Ranger Regiment.

After four years of active duty, Holton joined the Wisconsin Army National Guard, where he received training as a helicopter mechanic and eventually became trained as an Aeroscout Observer, flying the Bell OH-58 Kiowa Helicopter. His awards and decorations include the Army Service Ribbon, Good Conduct Medal, National Defense Service Medal, Army Commendation Medal, Senior Parachutist Badge, Ranger tab, Expert Infantryman Badge, and Combat Infantryman Badge.

== War correspondent ==
Holton has been a freelance war correspondent, reporting for the Christian Broadcasting Network (CBN) since 2003, the Life of Duty Network and others. Holton has traveled extensively as a cameraman for Lt. Col. Oliver North. Specifically, he worked as a freelance cameraman and field producer for "War Stories with Oliver North" on Fox News.

== Media career ==
His dispatches and articles appear on CBN's site, and he hosted a web-only television show from 2012 to 2018 called Life of Duty: Frontlines. In addition, he published a weblog entitled "Boots on the Ground", where he discussed issues related to the wars in the Middle East and troop morale. In late 2018, he started a podcast entitled "The Hot Zone with Chuck Holton", which is syndicated on several news sites. As of June 2025, The Hot Zone With Chuck Holton has 183K subscribers, with 33,088,918 views. He hosts a weekly men's gathering known as "The Arms Room."

Currently, he is the owner of Live Fire Media, a global production company.

== Personal life ==
Holton is married and has five grown children. He speaks Spanish, and resides full time in Panama and part-time in West Virginia.

== Published works ==
Holton is the author of eight books:

- Stories From a Soldier's Heart: For the Patriotic Soul, 2003, ISBN 1-59052-307-5
- A More Elite Soldier: Pursuing a Life of Purpose, 2003, ISBN 1-59052-215-X
- Bulletproof, the Making of an Invincible Mind, 2005, ISBN 1-59052-398-9
- Allah's Fire (Task Force Valor Series #1), 2006, ISBN 1-59052-405-5
- Island Inferno (Task Force Valor Series #2), 2007, ISBN 1-59052-503-5
- Meltdown (Task Force Valor Series #3), 2009, ISBN 978-1-59052-560-9
- Making Men - Five Steps to Growing Up, 2011, ISBN 0-615-54439-8
- Prowess - The Man You Were Meant To Be, 2019, ISBN 978-1697434576

== Filmography ==
- Armenia a Love Story, 2023
- The Lost Shipwreck of Paul, 2015

== Book collaborations ==
He has also collaborated with Oliver North on two books:

- American Heroes: In the Fight Against Radical Islam (War Stories), 2008, ISBN 978-0-8054-4953-2
- American Heroes in Special Operations, 2010, ISBN 978-0-8054-4712-5
