= Christian Broadcasting Network =

American religious television station

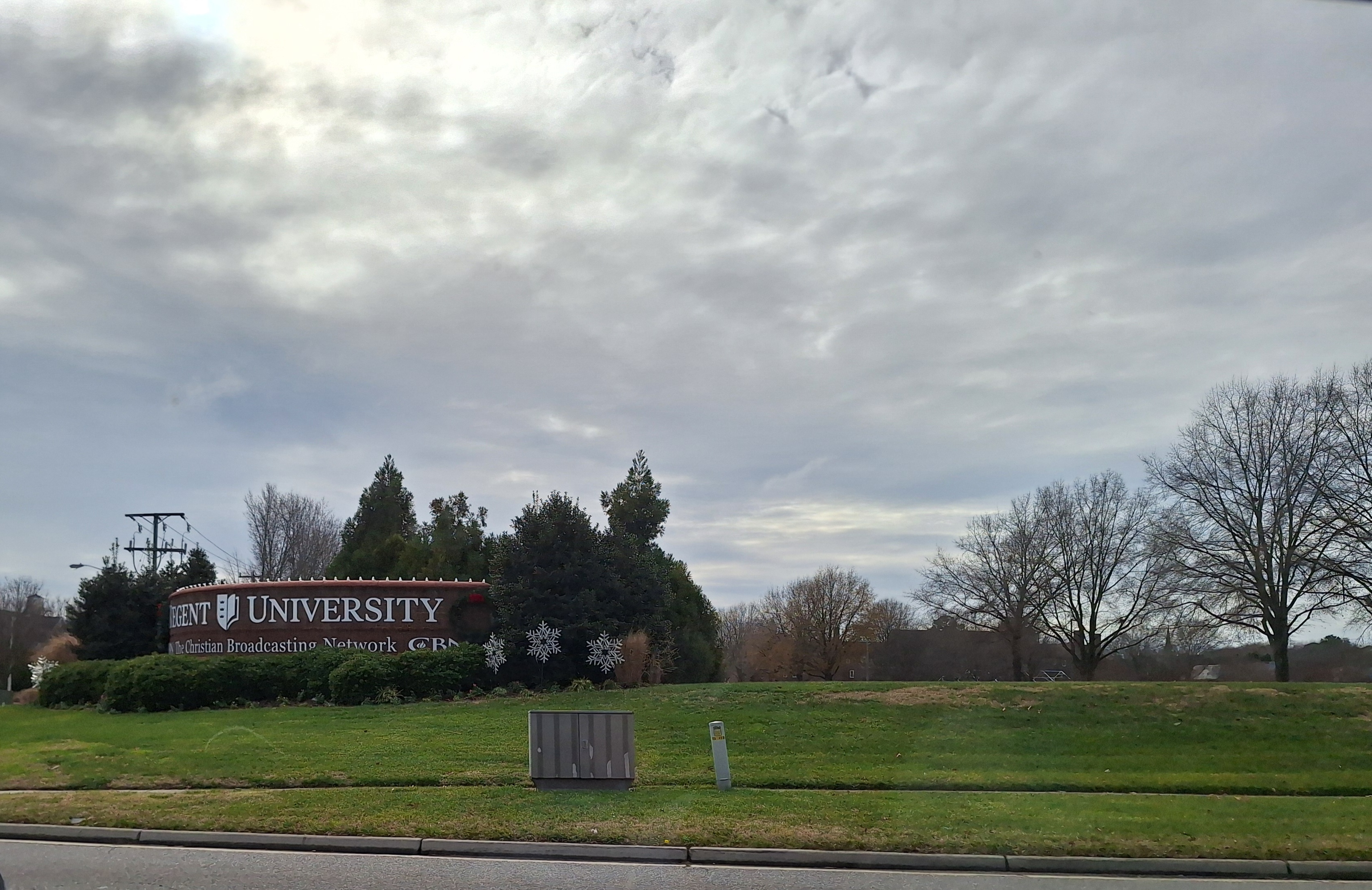
- Sign for CBN and Regent University
- Type: Christian media television network / production company
- Country: United States
- Availability: International; some programs are carried by Trinity Broadcasting Network, FamilyNet, LeSEA, TCT, and Freeform, as well as through syndication
- Founded: 1960; 66 years ago by Pat Robertson
- Headquarters: Virginia Beach, Virginia
- Owner: The Christian Broadcasting Network, Inc.
- Key people: Gordon P. Robertson (CEO); Rob Allman (news director)
- Launch date: 1961; 65 years ago
- Former affiliations: CBN Satellite Service (1977–1981)
- Official website: cbn.com

The Christian Broadcasting Network (CBN) is an American Christian media production and distribution organization founded in 1960 by televangelist Pat Robertson. It produces the long-running television program The 700 Club, co-produces the animated Superbook franchise (including the original 1981 series and its 2011 reboot), and operates multiple television channels and radio stations. The organization's international headquarters are in Virginia Beach, Virginia. Since its inception, CBN has been described as being "at the forefront of the culture wars".

== Operations ==
CBN primarily functions as a production company for its flagship program, The 700 Club, and other news and religious programming. Other syndicated programs include CBN NewsWatch, Christian World News, and 700 Club Interactive.

The 700 Club began as a local telethon in the 1960s and evolved into a daily religious variety program featuring sermons, interviews, and music. By the late 1970s, the show had incorporated news segments and political commentary, becoming one of the longest-running religious television programs in the United States.

CBN News produces daily and weekly news programming for both Christian and general audiences. It operates the CBN News Channel, launched in 2018, and maintains news bureaus in Virginia Beach, Washington, D.C., and Jerusalem.

Internationally, CBN has produced content in more than 70 languages through affiliated organizations such as CBN Asia and CBN India, which create localized versions of The 700 Club and other programming.

Some CBN programs are distributed by other evangelical networks, including the Trinity Broadcasting Network and Tri-State Christian Television. The 700 Club continues to air under syndication agreements with secular broadcasters, including Freeform.

== History ==
CBN was founded by Pat Robertson in 1960 in Portsmouth, Virginia. In 1980, the company moved its headquarters from Portsmouth to Virginia Beach.

=== Radio ===
CBN began broadcasting in October 1961 with WYAH-TV (now WGNT-TV) in Portsmouth. The ministry's subsidiary, Continental Broadcasting Network, operated several family-oriented independent stations. Their programming combined predominantly religious content on Sundays with acquired secular shows such as westerns, sitcoms, drama series, and children's programs. Funding primarily came from small donations by individuals and local churches.

The organization acquired several stations across the United States, including:

- An FM sister station, Norfolk, Virginia-based WXRI, acquired in August 1962
- In 1969, CBN Northeast was launched as a simulcast network of five New York FM radio stations formerly part of the Rural Radio Network:
  - WBIV in Wethersfield
  - WEIV in Ithaca
  - WJIV in Cherry Valley
  - WMIV in South Bristol
  - WOIV in DeRuyter
- WHAE-TV in Atlanta, Georgia, acquired in 1971
- KBFI-TV in Dallas, Texas, acquired in 1973, which later changed its call sign to KXTX-TV
- WXNE-TV in Boston, Massachusetts, acquired in October 1977

CBN expanded outside the US in 1968 when it acquired the Nuevo Continente radio station in Bogotá, Colombia, the first evangelical radio station in that country. CBN transferred ownership of Nuevo Continente to Colombian pastor and broadcaster Ignacio Guevara on June 7, 1972. In June 1979, CBN partnered with George Otis Ministries to establish a combined radio and TV station in southern Lebanon, broadcasting 28 hours per week of Christian programming in Hebrew.

The upstate New York radio stations were sold in 1982. Three over-the-air TV stations were sold between 1984 and 1989. WXRI radio in Portsmouth was also sold in 1989.

=== Television ===
On April 29, 1977, CBN launched its national cable network, the CBN Satellite Service, a Christian television service in the United States. The channel was among the earliest cable channels to distribute its signal across the United States through satellite transmission.

The CBN Satellite Service became the CBN Cable Network on September 1, 1981. It adopted a more secular programming format featuring family-oriented series and films while retaining some religious programs from various televangelists. Its coverage grew to 10.9 million households with cable television subscriptions and began airing a late-night block of classic family-oriented shows such as You Bet Your Life with Groucho Marx, I Married Joan, and The Many Loves of Dobie Gillis. In August 1988, the CBN Cable Network became The CBN Family Channel.

In January 1990, the network was sold to an affiliated entity, International Family Entertainment (IFE). IFE was majority-owned by the Robertson family, with a minority interest held by John C. Malone. On September 15 of that year, the newly sold channel rebranded as The Family Channel. It remained the most-watched outlet for CBN programs. IFE went on to launch other TV channels in the US and UK, with plans to expand further. IFE was sold to News Corporation in June 1997. At this time, The Family Channel was the US's ninth-largest cable network, reaching 67 million households. The terms of the sale stipulated that the channel continue carrying The 700 Club in perpetuity. Pat Robertson said that "We expect to continue to benefit from The Family Channel's growing family entertainment franchise." The channel was then sold to The Walt Disney Company in 2001, which renamed it as ABC Family later that year, and again to Freeform in 2016.

In October 2002, CBN launched CBN NewsWatch, a new half-hour weekend program. On April 29, 2008, the 24-hour CBN News Channel was launched as an online-only channel. On October 1, 2018, the CBN News Channel was relaunched and became available over the air via 15 stations in the United States, as well as continuing online. It was based in Virginia Beach, with bureaus in Washington, D.C., and Jerusalem.

In addition to its networks in the US, CBN has expanded into international television. On April 10, 1982, a Christian-based television station in South Lebanon, Hope TV, was donated to CBN and became Middle East Television (METV). At this time, METV broadcast from Marjayoun. In Israel, METV was known for broadcasting WWF wrestling, which was not available on Israeli TV. The station also broadcast news, sports, family entertainment, and religious programming. On June 5, 1997, METV launched its 24-hour programming broadcast on the Israeli satellite Amos 2. This allowed it to reach a potential audience of 200 million people in 15 nations, including Israel, Jordan, Lebanon, Syria, Egypt, and Cyprus. METV was sold to LeSEA Broadcasting in July 2001.

In 1990, CBN programs began broadcasting in the Soviet Union, and then in its successor states after they declared independence. It started with prime time specials, then later added The 700 Club and Superbook. These broadcasts were followed by 190 different rallies throughout the region that each resulted in the establishment of a new church. Similar special projects were implemented in the Philippines and Romania in 1994.

=== Television programming ===
A daily talk program began on WYAH in 1966; this program would eventually become known as The 700 Club. The International 700 Club was first broadcast on November 7, 1976, in the Philippines. International versions of the show continued with:

- The 700 Club Asia in 1999
- Le Club 700 for Francophone Africa in 2002
- Club 700 for German speakers in 2007 (renamed Erlebt TV in December 2019)
- The 700 Club with Paul and Fiona for UK audiences, hosted by Paul Jones and Fiona Hendley in 2004
- The 700 Club Canada in 2011
- 700 Club Nigeria

In June 1981, The 700 Club shifted away from its talk show format to a structure more akin to a news-magazine broadcast.

The TV program 700 Club Interactive began on May 25, 2009.

In 1997, Turning Point International (TPI), an English-language magazine program for people of African descent worldwide, was established.

In 2001, a youth-oriented show, One Cubed, began in Asia. On September 18, 2003, a US version of One Cubed launched, featuring extreme sports, music videos, and celebrity interviews. A Nigerian version of One Cubed was also later created.

In 2004, Club 400 Hoy began as a daily program for Spanish speakers throughout the Americas. In October 2021, Club 400 Hoy was relaunched as a weekly US-focused program.

On April 30, 2007, First Landing was produced by CBN and Regent University documenting the English settlement of Jamestown. It aired on ABC Family and various broadcast stations across the US.

=== Other ventures ===
In 1977, CBN University was established for "the specific purpose of preparing leaders who would not only succeed in their professions but also advance as Christians equipped to effectively impact their world." CBN University rebranded as Regent University in 1990. The university built the luxury hotel The Founders Inn & Spa on its campus. The hotel's name refers to the US Founding Fathers.

The affiliated charity Operation Blessing was established on November 14, 1978. It was initially intended to help struggling individuals and families by matching their needs for items such as clothing, appliances, and vehicles with donations from viewers of The 700 Club. Coordinating with local churches and other organizations, Operation Blessing expanded its matching funds program to include food provisions and financial assistance for low-income families.

CBN launched its first website in March 1995.

CBN has established international offices, including CBN Europe in the UK in 2002, CBN Deutschland in 2007, CBN Africa in 1994, and CBN India in 2000. CBN Asia was established in the Philippines and Hong Kong on October 1, 1994. Since then, CBN Asia has launched the children's program A.S.T.I.G. (All Set to Imitate God); Oyayi; and the music program CBN Asia Reverb, later renamed Reverb Worship PH.

During the first Trump administration (2017–2021), CBN paid at least $170,000 to host events at Donald Trump's properties. Subsequently, CBN obtained access to the White House similar to that of larger news outlets and was given frequent exclusive interviews with senior administration staff, including Trump himself.

== Programs ==
=== Current ===
- The 700 Club – a daily news magazine that debuted in 1966. The program is currently hosted by Gordon Robertson, Terry Meeuwsen, Ashley Key, Wendy Griffith, and Andrew Knox. The 700 Club features a daily news segment with commentary on certain stories, as well as interviews.
- Club 700 Hoy – a half-hour weekly Spanish-language version of The 700 Club syndicated throughout Latin America, and previously aired in the United States on Azteca America. The magazine-style formatted morning program features opinions on current issues, interviews, informative features, stories about people and places, music, and life advice.
- CBN NewsWatch – produced by CBN News, it is a half-hour daily news program featuring reports on national and international news stories from a Christian perspective. It is broadcast nationally on several Christian-oriented cable and satellite networks.
- Christian World News – produced by CBN News, it is a half-hour weekly news program broadcast nationally on the Trinity Broadcasting Network.
- One Cubed USA and One Cubed International – aimed at teenagers and young adults between the ages of 13 and 24, the two programs focus on youth culture, action sports, and music videos.

== Notable personalities ==
=== Current ===
- Gordon P. Robertson – co-host of The 700 Club
- David Brody – host of The Brody File
- Terry Meeuwsen – co-host of The 700 Club and 700 Club Interactive
- Chuck Holton – military correspondent
- Ashley Key – co-host for 700 Club Interactive and co-host of The 700 Club

=== Former ===
- Pat Robertson – co-host of The 700 Club (retired in 2021)
- Ben Kinchlow – co-host of The 700 Club
- Victor Oladokun — co-host of CBN World News and Turning Point
- Sheila Walsh – co-host of The 700 Club
- Danuta Rylko Soderman – co-host of The 700 Club
- Lisa Ryan – co-host of The 700 Club
- Susan Howard – co-host of The 700 Club

== Final stations ==
In the following tables, final CBN-owned stations are arranged alphabetically by state and community of license.

Note: Two boldface asterisks appearing following a station's call letters (**) indicate a station that was built and signed on by CBN.

=== Television ===
City of license / market	Station	Channel	Years owned	Current ownership status
Atlanta, GA	WHAE-TV/; WANX-TV **	46	1971–1984	Independent station WANF, owned by Gray Media.
Boston, MA	WXNE-TV **	25	1977–1987	Fox affiliate WFXT, owned by Cox Media Group.
Dallas–Fort Worth, TX	KXTX-TV ^{1}	33	1973	CW station KDAF, owned-and-operated (O&O) by Nexstar Media Group.
Dallas–Fort Worth, TX	KXTX-TV ^{1, 2}	39	1973–2000	Telemundo owned-and-operated (O&O).
Portsmouth, VA	WYAH-TV	27	1961–1989	Independent station WGNT, owned by the E. W. Scripps Company.

In addition, CBN planned to build a television station in Richmond, Virginia, WRNX on UHF channel 63. However, CBN sold the construction permit for that station to National Capitol Christian Television in 1982, which signed on the station as WTLL in 1984. That station was eventually sold and, in 1986, converted into a secular independent station WVRN-TV, which shut down in 1988.

Notes:

- ^{1} CBN traded the broadcast license for KXTX-TV on channel 33 to Doubleday Broadcasting in exchange for Doubleday's license to operate KDTV on channel 39 in November 1973;
- ^{2} Operated by LIN Media under a local marketing agreement from 1993 until 1997.

=== Radio ===
**FM stations**

City of license / Market	Station	Years owned	Current ownership
Cherry Valley–Albany, NY	WJIV 101.9	1969–1982	owned by Christian Broadcasting System, Ltd.
DeRuyter–Syracuse, NY	WOIV 102.7	1969–1982	WCIS-FM, owned by Family Life Ministries
Ithaca, NY	WEIV 103.7	1969–1982	WQNY, owned by Saga Communications
South Bristol–Rochester, NY	WMIV 95.1	1969–1982	WAIO, owned by iHeartMedia
Wethersfield–Buffalo, NY	WBIV 107.7	1969–1982	WLKK, owned by Audacy, Inc.
Norfolk, VA	WXRI 105.3 **	1962–1989	WNOH, owned by iHeartMedia
