= The 700 Club =

Television show

- Genre: Christian news/talk
- Presented by: Gordon Robertson (1999–); Terry Meeuwsen (1993–); Wendy Griffith (2013–); Ashley Key (2021–); Andrew Knox (2022–); John Jessup (2003–); Charlene Aaron (2003–)
- Narrated by: Wendy Griffith, Gordon Robertson
- Theme music composer: Jeremy Sweet
- Country of origin: United States
- Original language: English

Production
- Production location: Virginia Beach, Virginia
- Running time: 60 minutes

Original release
- Network: Christian Broadcasting Network/Syndicated (1966–); Freeform (1977–)
- Release: April 1, 1966 – present

The 700 Club is the flagship television program of the Christian Broadcasting Network, airing each weekday in syndication in the United States. The news magazine program features live guests, daily news, political opinion commentary, contemporary music, testimonies, and Christian ministry. Celebrities and other guests are often interviewed, and Christian lifestyle issues are presented. The program additionally features world news stories plus investigative reporting by the CBN News team.

The 700 Club has been in production since 1966 and was initially hosted by Jim Bakker, now hosted by Gordon Robertson, Terry Meeuwsen, Ashley Key, Wendy Griffith and Andrew Knox. Previous co-hosts include Pat Robertson (1966–1987; 1988–2021), Ben Kinchlow (1975–1988, 1992–1996), Sheila Walsh (1987–1992), Danuta Rylko Soderman (1983–1988), Kristi Watts (1999–2013), and Lisa Ryan (1996–2005). Tim Robertson served as host for a year (1987–88) along with Kinchlow and actress Susan Howard, while Pat Robertson ran unsuccessfully for President in the 1988 campaign.

== History ==
In 1960, Pat Robertson, the son of former U.S. Senator Absalom Willis Robertson, purchased the license for WTOV-TV, channel 27 in Portsmouth, Virginia (unrelated to the current WTOV-TV in Steubenville, Ohio), which had ceased operation because of poor viewership. Renamed WYAH-TV (known today as independent station WGNT), the station began broadcasting Christian programming to the Hampton Roads area on October 1, 1961.

In 1962, the station suffered financially and almost closed. It had a total operating budget of $700 per month. To keep the station on the air, WYAH produced a special telethon edition of the show. For the telethon, Robertson set a goal of 700 members each contributing $10 per month (equivalent to $106 in 2025), which was enough to support the station. Robertson referred to these members as the "700 Club" and the name stuck. The telethon was successful and is still held annually.

After the telethon in 1966, The 700 Club continued as a nightly, two-hour Christian variety program of music, preaching, group prayer, Bible study, and interview segments. The music was hymns, instrumental pieces, southern gospel music, and urban gospel music.

The first permanent host of the program was Jim Bakker, who, along with his then-wife Tammy Faye Bakker, also hosted a children's show on WYAH called Come On Over (later retitled Jim and Tammy). The couple left CBN in 1972; reportedly, Jim Bakker was fired by Pat Robertson over philosophical differences. The Bakkers then moved on to help launch the Trinity Broadcasting Network (TBN) before starting their own television ministry and signature show, The PTL Club. After the Bakkers left, some staffers at the station reportedly responded by destroying the Bakkers' sets and puppets. Pat Robertson took over as host and evolved his 700 Club by cutting back on music and preaching and heading toward the talk show format developed by Bakker. Robertson transformed the 700 Club from a nightly religious-themed telethon to a Christian talk show.

The 700 Club originally aired only on WYAH-TV and other CBN-owned stations in Atlanta (WANX-TV) and Dallas (KXTX-TV), and later Boston (WXNE-TV). The program entered national syndication in 1974, as CBN purchased airtime on stations such as WWOR-TV in New York City, KCOP-TV in Los Angeles, WPHL-TV in Philadelphia, and WDCA in Washington, D.C., among others. The roster of stations carrying the program grew to over 100 markets by 1976. In some markets, the show aired on multiple stations, choosing between either the full 90-minute version or an edited 60-minute version. In 1977, The 700 Club received additional exposure nationally on the newly launched CBN Satellite Service where, like CBN's broadcast outlets, it aired three times daily.

In 1979, The 700 Club moved its studios from WYAH's facilities in Portsmouth into CBN's then-new campus in neighboring Virginia Beach, from where the program continues to originate. During the 1980s, the show evolved into more of a format resembling a magazine show like Group W's PM Magazine, with news/opinion and lifestyle segments interspersed with interviews. In some markets, The 700 Club aired during the morning hours, competing head-to-head with the major network "breakfast television" programs such as NBC's Today and ABC's Good Morning America.

After CBN sold its group of terrestrial stations later in the decade, The 700 Club continued to air on CBN Cable as well as many commercial secular stations and Christian stations nationally. CBN was re-branded as The Family Channel in 1988. The Family Channel was packaged as part of a sale of International Family Entertainment to News Corporation and television producer Haim Saban in 1998. The channel was renamed Fox Family Channel, but only three years later Fox Family was sold to The Walt Disney Company and was subsequently re-branded ABC Family. Disney later rebranded ABC Family as Freeform on January 12, 2016; Freeform was later reunited with many of its former corporate siblings from News Corporation in 2019. As of 2005, The 700 Club airs on Freeform three times daily, part of a contractual obligation originally made as part of the Family Channel's sale to News Corporation. As of 2009, the first airing of the show in the morning (only) has been preceded by a half-hour show called 700 Club Interactive, which utilizes Internet user-generated videos and comments by viewers of the show. Longtime host Pat Robertson announced his retirement from The 700 Club on October 1, 2021.

== Political advocacy ==
Between 1978 and 1980, discussions on current political issues became a part of the program, and news segments were added in the first 20 minutes of the show. The 700 Club strongly supports Israel, especially in its conflicts with the Palestinians and the United Nations.

== Staff ==
Hosts

- Gordon Robertson (1999–)
- Terry Meeuwsen (1993–)
- Wendy Griffith (2013–), occasional news anchor
- Ashley Key (2021–)
- Andrew Knox (2022–)
- John Jessup (2003–), main news anchor
- Charlene Aaron (2003–), news anchor

CBN News reporters

- Jennifer Wishon (2008–)
- Efrem Graham (2009–)
- Mark Martin (2009–)
- Gary Lane (1984–)
- Dale Hurd (1991–)
- Chris Mitchell (1989–)
- Paul Strand (1995–)
- George Thomas (1996–)
- Heather Sells (2005–)
- Lorie Johnson (2009–)
- Caitlin Burke (2014–)
- Abigail Robertson (2015–)
- Jenna Browder (2016–)
- Brody Carter (2021–)

=== Former ===
Hosts

- Pat Robertson (1966–1987, 1988–2021)
- Jim Bakker (1966–1972) alternating hosting duties with Robertson
- Ben Kinchlow (1975–1988, 1992–1996)
- Sheila Walsh (1987–1992)
- Danuta Rylko Soderman (1983–1988)
- Kristi Watts (1999–2013)
- Lisa Ryan (1996–2005)
- Tim Robertson (1987–1988)
- Susan Howard (1987–1988)

CBN News reporters

- Lee Webb (2001–2013)
- Scott Ross (1988–2023)

== Criticism ==
As a commentator and minister on The 700 Club, Robertson made many controversial statements attracting criticism.

On March 23, 1995, Pat Robertson led a television program in which he attacked Hinduism, calling it "demonic". He has also referred to Islam as "Satanic". Robertson has denounced views of feminism, activism regarding homosexuality, abortion, and liberal college professors. Critics claim Robertson had business dealings in Africa with former presidents Charles Taylor of Liberia and Mobutu Sese Seko of Zaire, both of whom had been internationally denounced for claims of human rights violations. Robertson was criticized worldwide for his call for Hugo Chávez's assassination and for his remarks concerning Ariel Sharon's ill-health as an act of God.

Former 700 Club co-host Danuta Rylko Soderman later criticized Robertson for having no room on the show for profiling people with progressive illness, who were overweight, had facial blemishes, used wheelchairs, crutches, were blind or had blindness, no disabilities that could not be healed as Robertson viewed people with such problems as "failures of the faith" and that "Robertson offers the Reader's Digest version of answers to difficult and demanding religious, social, financial, marital, political, sexual and moral concepts." She also accused the show of faking a piece that had Robertson walking into a Contras camp in the Nicaraguan jungle during the Nicaraguan Civil War, claiming that the camp was actually a "prop" built by an airfield specifically for Robertson's visit.

The week of September 11, 2001, Robertson discussed the terror attacks with Jerry Falwell, who said that "the ACLU has to take a lot of blame for this" in addition to "the pagans, and the abortionists, and the feminists, and the gays, and the lesbians [who have] helped [the terror attacks of September 11th] happen". Robertson replied, "I totally concur". Both evangelists were seriously criticized by President George W. Bush for their commentary, for which Falwell later issued an apology.

In October 2003, while interviewing State Department critic Joel Mowbray about his book Dangerous Diplomacy, Robertson appeared to suggest that destroying the Harry S Truman Building with a nuclear bomb would enhance United States security by eliminating a nest of liberal traitors who secretly yearn for Islamic world domination. After officials condemned his remarks, Robertson aired a "clarifying" segment which he described as "issu[ing] a correction to the State Department" in which he reiterated his previous comments.

On November 9, 2009, Robertson said that Islam is "a violent political system bent on the overthrow of the governments of the world and world domination". He went on to elaborate that "you're dealing with not a religion, you're dealing with a political system, and I think we should treat it as such, and treat its adherents as such as we would members of the communist party, members of some fascist group".

Robertson's response to the 2010 Haiti earthquake also drew worldwide controversy and was met with international condemnation. Robertson claimed that Haiti's founders had sworn a "pact to the Devil" in order to liberate themselves from the French slave owners and indirectly attributed the earthquake to the consequences of the Haitian people being "cursed" for doing so. CBN later issued a statement saying that Robertson's comments "were based on the widely-discussed 1791 slave rebellion led by Dutty Boukman at Bois Caiman, where the slaves allegedly made a famous pact with the devil in exchange for victory over the French". Various figures in mainline and evangelical Christianity have on occasion disavowed some of Robertson's remarks.
