= Operation Blessing International =

American Christian aid organization

Operation Blessing
- Founded: 1978
- Type: Non-Government Organization
- Purpose: Disaster Relief & Development
- Location: Virginia Beach, Virginia, United States
- Region served: 65+ countries
- Method: Direct Aid / Program Funding
- Key people: Drew Friedrich (President)
- Revenue: USD $90,081,546 (2023)
- Website: https://www.ob.org/

Operation Blessing International (OB) is a faith-based humanitarian organization headquartered in Virginia Beach, Virginia, United States. Founded in 1978, OB operates in more than 65 countries, focusing on disaster relief, medical aid, clean water, hunger relief, and child development programs.

== History ==
Operation Blessing International (OB) was founded on November 14, 1978, by businessman and televangelist Pat Robertson. Its stated purpose was to assist people facing challenges by connecting their needs, like clothing and appliances, with donations from viewers of The 700 Club. OB worked with local churches and organizations to expand its support to include food and financial aid for low-income families. In 1986, it partnered with Development Corporation and became a 501(c)(3) nonprofit organization. In 1990, OB shifted its focus from individual assistance to funding outreach centers across the U.S. These centers collaborate with local ministries, food pantries, and shelters. In 1994, Pat Robertson made pleas on The 700 Club for cash donations to OB to support airlifts of refugees from Rwanda to Zaire. The Virginian-Pilot later discovered that OB's planes were transporting diamond-mining equipment for the African Development Corporation, a venture Robertson had established in cooperation with president of Zaire Mobutu Sese Seko. According to Operation Blessing records, Robertson owned the planes used for OB airlifts. A 1999 report concluded that, while Robertson's request for donations to OB had been misleading, it was not an intentional attempt to commit fraud. A September 2013 article in The Guardian claimed Robertson was accused of taking credit for work that was done by Médecins Sans Frontières. In a December 2013, The Guardian issued an apology to Operation Blessing, retracting many of their accusations, acknowledging that they had not mentioned a further report that cleared Operation Blessing of any wrongdoing, and agreeing to donate to their "relief efforts for victims of the typhoon in the Philippines."

== Activities ==
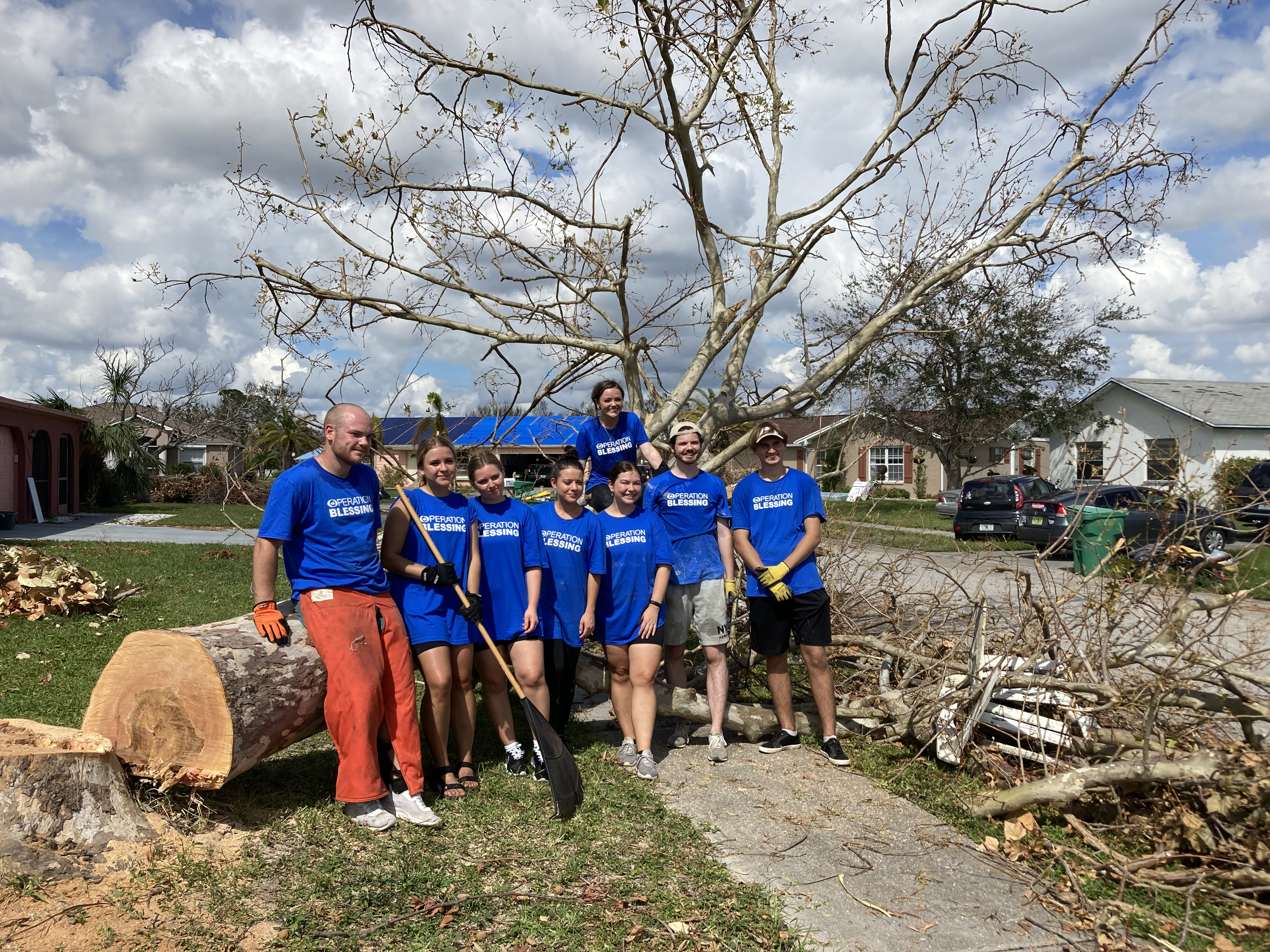
A team from Operation Blessing assisting a homeowner in Port Charlotte, Florida after Hurricane Ian

=== Disaster relief ===
Operation Blessing has been involved in domestic relief work for victims of many natural disasters, such as severe flooding in Nebraska, tornadoes in Mississippi, and hurricanes Michael and Florence in Florida and North Carolina. Internationally, Operation Blessing has assisted victims of humanitarian crises in Ukraine, Poland, Turkey, and Kenya. With a focus on public health, Operation Blessing was involved in working to combat the spread of Zika fever through educational initiatives, distribution of mosquito nets, and providing insect repellent.

OB's involvement extends to various natural disasters around the world, including the April 2015 Nepal earthquake, the 2013 Typhoon Haiyan in the Philippines, the 2011 Tōhoku earthquake and tsunami, and the 2010 Haiti earthquake and accompanying cholera outbreak.

More recently, OB has responded to the 2025 history-making Hurricane Melissa in Jamaica, supported those impacted by the injustices in Burundi (2025), aided artisans in Asheville, NC after Hurricane Helene (2024) devastated their livelihood, and helped refugees from the war in Ukraine in 2022.

== Partnerships ==
Operation Blessing has partnered with several organizations and nonprofits, including the Mayo Clinic of Minnesota, International Justice Mission, Free Wheelchair Mission, and Tide Loads of Hope. OB has also conducted annual food distributions with professional sports teams such as the Kansas City Chiefs, Kansas City Royals.

== Affiliation ==
Operation Blessing is a member of the Association of Evangelical Relief and Development Organizations (AERDO), and is registered with the Federal Emergency Management Agency (FEMA) and the United States Agency for International Development (USAID). It is also a national member of the National Voluntary Organizations Active in Disaster (NVOAD), Combined Federal Campaign (CFC), Christian Service Charities, Christian Service Organizations of America (CSOA), the Global Compassion Network, the Virginia Trucking Association, and the American Trucking Associations (ATA).

== Financial accountability ==
Operation Blessing is a member of the Evangelical Council for Financial Accountability (ECFA), and is audited annually by KPMG, LLP.
