= Pat Robertson =

American media mogul and minister (1930–2023)

The Reverend Pat Robertson
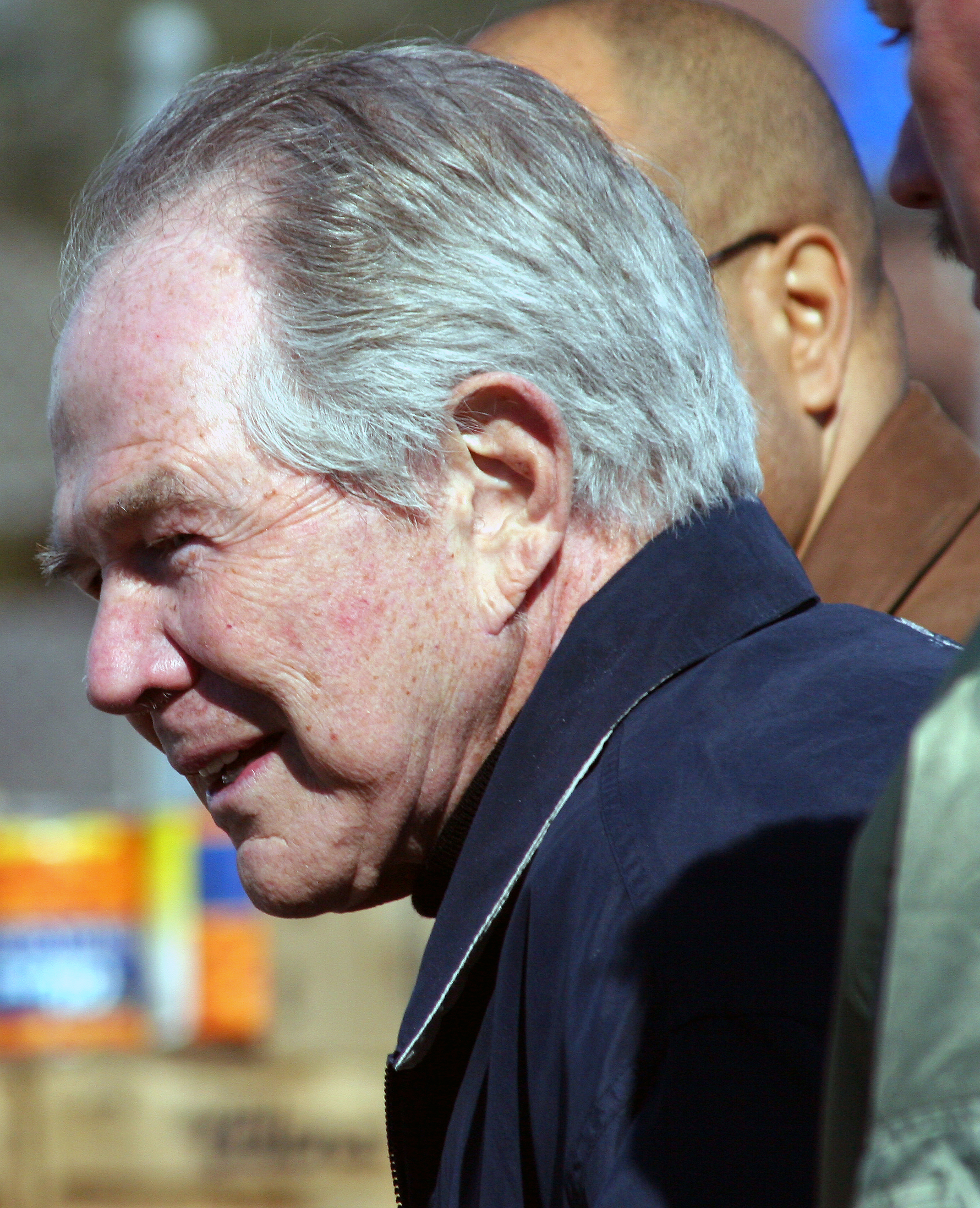
- Robertson in 2006
- Born: Marion Gordon Robertson; March 22, 1930; Lexington, Virginia, U.S.
- Died: June 8, 2023 (aged 93); Virginia Beach, Virginia, U.S.
- Education: Washington and Lee University (BA); Yale University (LLB); New York Theological Seminary (MDiv)
- Occupations: Chancellor of Regent University; Chairman of the Christian Broadcasting Network
- Years active: 1961–2023
- Television: The 700 Club (1966–2021)
- Political party: Republican
- Spouse: Dede Elmer (m. 1954; died 2022)
- Children: 4, including Gordon
- Father: Absalom Willis Robertson
- Military career
- Allegiance: United States
- Branch: United States Marine Corps
- Rank: First Lieutenant
- Conflicts: Korean War
- Website: Official website

Marion Gordon "Pat" Robertson (March 22, 1930 – June 8, 2023) was an American media mogul, televangelist, political commentator, presidential candidate, and charismatic movement-affiliated minister. Robertson advocated a conservative Christian ideology and was known for his involvement in Republican Party politics. He was associated with the Charismatic movement within Protestant evangelicalism. He served as head of Regent University and of the Christian Broadcasting Network (CBN).

Robertson's career spanned over five decades. He was the founder of several organizations including CBN, Regent University, Operation Blessing International Relief and Development Corporation, the International Family Entertainment Inc. (ABC Family Channel/Freeform), the American Center for Law & Justice (ACLJ), the Founders Inn and Conference Center, and the Christian Coalition.

Robertson was also a best-selling author and the host of The 700 Club, a Christian news and TV program broadcast live weekdays on Freeform (formerly ABC Family) from CBN studios, as well as on channels throughout the United States, and on CBN network affiliates worldwide. Robertson retired from The 700 Club in October 2021.

The son of U.S. Senator A. Willis Robertson, Robertson was a Southern Baptist and was active as an ordained minister with that denomination for many years, but held to a charismatic theology not traditionally common among Southern Baptists. He unsuccessfully campaigned to become the Republican nominee in the 1988 presidential election. As a result of his seeking political office, he never again served in an official role for any church.

Scholars and writers have commented on the degree to which Robertson influenced the direction of American politics on the religious and political right.

Robertson remained a controversial figure, especially known for evangelical religiocentrism. While he became a recognized and influential public voice for conservative Christianity in the U.S. and around the world, his opposition to various progressive causes including LGBTQ rights, feminism, and abortion, was frequently criticized.

Robertson was also known for his belief in conspiracy theories, particularly those regarding the Illuminati and New World Order, and has been referred to as "a vector for vivid conspiracy theories on the right".

== Early life ==
Marion Gordon Robertson was born on March 22, 1930, in Lexington, Virginia, into a prominent political family, the younger of two sons. His parents were Absalom Willis Robertson (1887–1971), a conservative Democratic Senator, and Gladys Churchill (née Willis; 1897–1968), a housewife and a musician. At a young age, Robertson was nicknamed 'Pat' by his six-year-old brother, Willis Robertson Jr., who enjoyed patting him on the cheeks when he was a baby while saying "pat, pat, pat". Later, Robertson thought about which first name he would like people to use. He considered "Marion" to be effeminate, and "M. Gordon" to be affected, so he opted for his childhood nickname "Pat".

When he was eleven, Robertson was enrolled in the preparatory McDonogh School outside Baltimore, Maryland. From 1940 until 1946, he attended The McCallie School in Chattanooga, Tennessee, where he graduated with honors. He gained admission to Washington and Lee University, where he earned a B.A. in history, graduating magna cum laude. He was also a member of Phi Beta Kappa, the nation's most prestigious academic honor society. He joined Sigma Alpha Epsilon fraternity. Robertson said, "Although I worked hard at my studies, my real major centered around lovely young ladies who attended the nearby girls schools."

In 1948, the draft was reinstated and Robertson was given the option of joining the U.S. Marine Corps or being drafted into the U.S. Army; he opted for the former. Robertson described his military service as follows: "We did long, grueling marches to toughen the men, plus refresher training in firearms and bayonet combat."

In the same year, he transferred to Korea, "I ended up at the headquarters command of the First Marine Division," says Robertson. "The Division was in combat in the hot and dusty, then bitterly cold portion of North Korea just above the 38th Parallel later identified as the 'Punchbowl' and 'Heartbreak Ridge'." For Robertson's service in the Korean War, he was awarded three Battle Stars.

In 1986, former Republican Congressman Paul "Pete" McCloskey Jr., who served with Robertson in Camp Pendleton, wrote a public letter challenging Robertson's record in the military. Robertson filed a libel suit against McCloskey, but he dropped the case in 1988 in order to devote "his full time and energies toward the successful attainment of the Republican nomination for the president of the United States."

Robertson was promoted to First Lieutenant in 1952 upon his return to the United States. He then went on to receive a law degree from Yale Law School in 1955, near the top of his class. However, he failed his first and only attempt at the New York bar exam.

Shortly thereafter, he underwent a religious conversion and decided against pursuing a career in business. Instead, Robertson attended The Biblical Seminary in New York, where he received a Master of Divinity degree in 1959. He became a born again Christian while having dinner at a restaurant in Philadelphia with author and World War II veteran, Cornelius Vanderbreggen. After his conversion, Robertson left the corporate world and went into ministry.

== Career ==
=== Christian Broadcasting Network ===
In 1956, Robertson met Dutch missionary Cornelius Vanderbreggen, who impressed Robertson both with his lifestyle and his message. Vanderbreggen quoted Proverbs (3:5, 6), "Trust in the Lord with all thine heart; and lean not unto thine own understanding. In all thy ways acknowledge Him, and He shall direct thy paths", which Robertson considered the "guiding principle" of his life. In 1961, he was ordained as a Southern Baptist minister by Freemason Street Baptist Church in Norfolk, Virginia.

In 1960, Robertson established the Christian Broadcasting Network in Virginia Beach, Virginia, by buying the license of a defunct UHF station in nearby Portsmouth. The station, with the call sign WYAH-TV, first broadcast on October 1, 1961. The network became known for producing the long-running TV series The 700 Club, starting in 1966, which Robertson served as a long time co-host. On April 29, 1977, CBN launched a religious cable network, the CBN Satellite Service, which eventually became The Family Channel. It was the first satellite television channel in America to connect to cable systems across the country. The venture became extremely lucrative, so Robertson spun off The Family Channel as a commercial entity that was sold to News Corporation for $1.9 billion in 1997.

In 1994, he endorsed the document "Evangelicals and Catholics Together". Robertson announced his retirement at the age of 91 from The 700 Club in October 2021, on the sixtieth anniversary of the first telecast on October 1, 1961, of what eventually became CBN.

=== Regent University ===
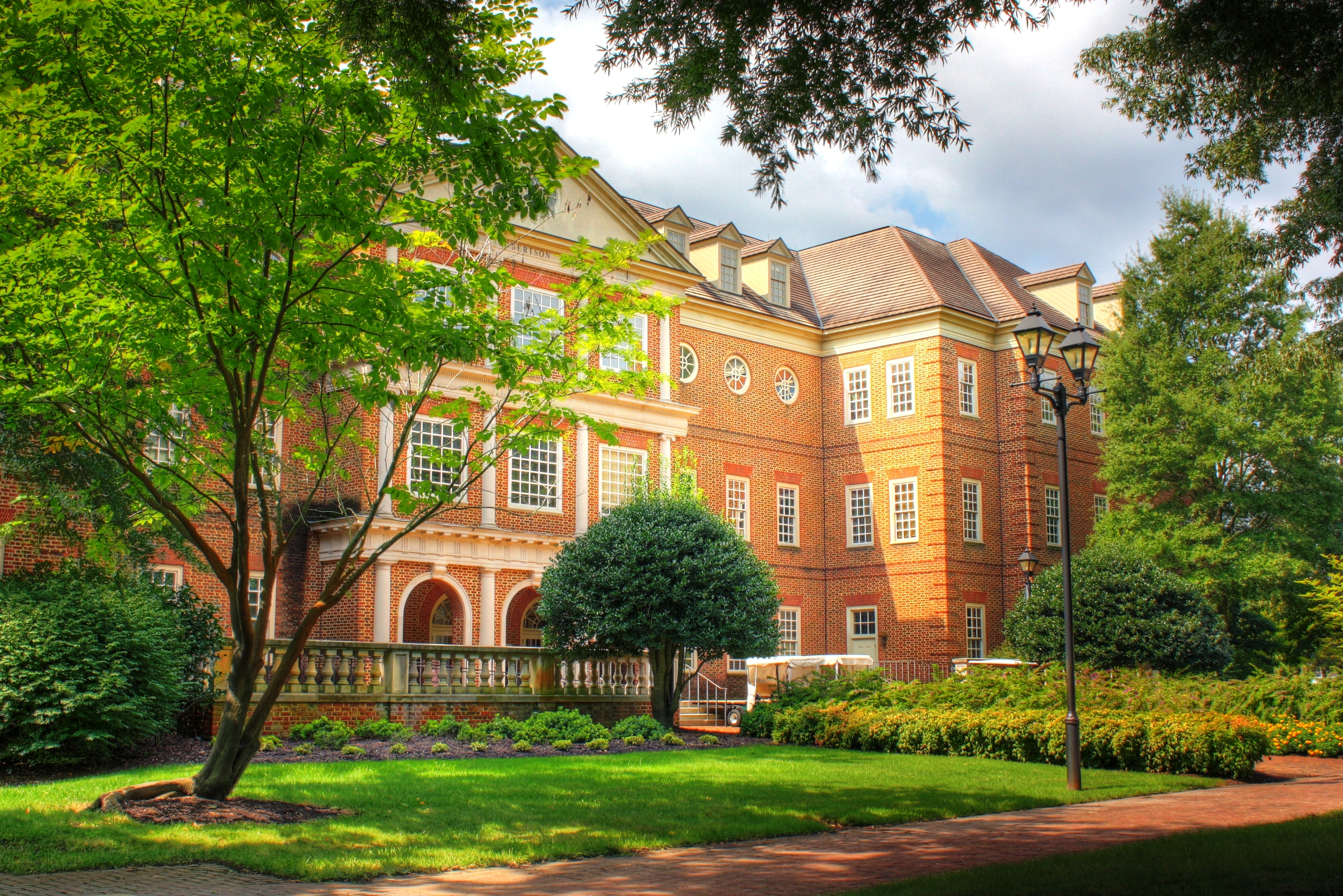
Regent University – Robertson Hall, home to the School of Law and Robertson School of Government

Robertson founded CBN University, a private Christian university, in 1977 on CBN's Virginia Beach campus. Since its founding, the university has established eight academic schools and offers associate, bachelor's, master's, and doctoral degrees in over 150 areas of study. It was renamed Regent University in 1990. According to the school's catalog, "a regent is one who represents Christ, our Sovereign, in whatever sphere of life he or she may be called to serve Him."

With more than 11,000 current students, Regent University has ranked the #1 Best Online Bachelor's Program in Virginia for ten years in a row by U.S. News & World Report 2022, as well as 2023 Best Graduate Schools-Law, Best Graduate Schools – Social Sciences and Humanities Doctoral Programs – Psychology, 2023 Best Graduate Schools – Public Affairs, and 2023 Best Education Schools by U.S. News & World Report. Robertson served as its chancellor and CEO.

Robertson was also founder and president of the American Center for Law & Justice, a public interest law firm headquartered in Washington, D.C., associated with Regent University School of Law in Virginia Beach, Virginia, which defends constitutional freedoms and conservative Christian ideals. Critics have characterized Robertson as an advocate of dominionism.

=== Operation Blessing ===
Robertson's Operation Blessing organization sent medical teams to developing countries to help people who had no access to medical care. In 1994, in the aftermath of the Rwandan genocide, Robertson solicited donations to provide medical supplies to refugees in neighboring Zaire (present-day Congo), where Robertson also had exploratory diamond mining operations. According to a 1999 article in The Virginian-Pilot, two Operation Blessing pilots who were interviewed alleged that the organization's planes were used to haul diamond-mining equipment to Robertson's mines in Zaire. Robertson denied the pilots' accounts.

In its 2021 ranking of "100 Largest Charities", Forbes ranked Operation Blessing/CBN at #44, with a fundraising efficiency of 93% (percentage of donations left after fundraising expenses) and charitable commitment of 87% (percentage of expenses paid toward the stated mission compared to other costs).

=== Political career and activism ===
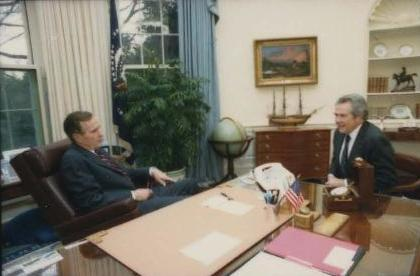
Robertson meets with President George H. W. Bush in 1991.

Robertson was a past president of the Council for National Policy. In 1982, he served on the Victims of Crime Task Force for U.S. President Ronald Reagan. In Virginia, he served on the Board of the Virginia Economic Development Partnership and on the Governor's Council of Economic Advisors. After his unsuccessful presidential campaign, Robertson started the Christian Coalition, a 1.7-million-member Christian right organization that campaigned mostly for conservative candidates. Billy McCormack, a Southern Baptist pastor in Shreveport, Louisiana, served as one of the four directors of the coalition as well as its vice president. The coalition was sued by the Federal Election Commission "for coordinating its activities with Republican candidates for office in 1990, 1992 and 1994 and failing to report its expenditures," yet the complaint was dismissed by a federal judge. In March 1986, he told Israeli Foreign Affairs that South Africa was a major contributor to the Reagan administration's efforts to help the anti-Sandinista forces.

Robertson was a member of the Virginia delegation to the 1992 Republican National Convention, and delivered an address to the convention.

In 1994, the Coalition was fined for "improperly [aiding] then Representative Newt Gingrich (R-GA) and Oliver North, who was then the Republican Senate nominee in Virginia."

Robertson was a governing member of the Council for National Policy (CNP) and served on its Board of Governors in 1982, was the President of its executive committee from 1985 to 1986, and a member in 1984, 1988, and 1998.

On November 7, 2007, Robertson announced that he was endorsing Rudy Giuliani to be the Republican nominee in the 2008 Presidential election. Some social conservatives criticized Robertson's endorsement of Giuliani, a pro-choice candidate who supported gay rights.

While usually associated with the political right, Robertson endorsed environmental causes. He appeared in a commercial with Al Sharpton, joking about this, and urging people to join the We Can Solve It campaign against global warming.

In January 2009, on a broadcast of The 700 Club, Robertson stated that he was "adamantly opposed" to the division of Jerusalem between Israel and the Palestinians. He also stated that Armageddon was "not going to be fought at Megiddo" but would be the "battle of Jerusalem," when "the forces of all nations come together and try to take Jerusalem away from the Jews. Jews are not going to give up Jerusalem – they shouldn't – and the rest of the world is going to insist they give it up." Robertson added that Jerusalem is a "spiritual symbol that must not be given away" because "Jesus Christ the Messiah will come down to the part of Jerusalem that the Arabs want," and this would be "not good."

Robertson repeatedly called for the legalization of cannabis, saying that it should be treated in a manner analogous to the regulation of alcoholic beverages and tobacco. Robertson stated that "I just think it's shocking how many of these young people wind up in prison and they get turned into hard-core criminals because they had a possession of a very small amount of controlled substance. The whole thing is crazy." In 2014, he turned against the legalization of cannabis, citing a need to protect children, whom he claimed were using cannabis at a higher rate in Colorado following legalization there.

==== 1988 presidential bid ====
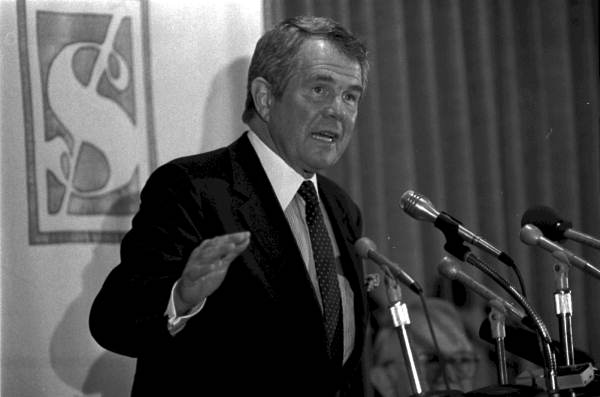
Robertson speaking at the Florida Economics Club in 1986

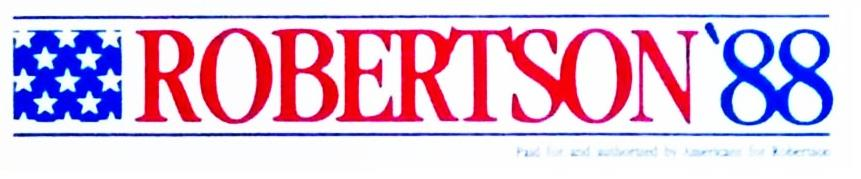
Bumper sticker from Robertson's campaign

In September 1986, Robertson announced his intention to seek the Republican nomination for President of the United States. Robertson said he would pursue the nomination only if three million people signed up to volunteer for his campaign by September 1987. Three million responded, and by the time Robertson announced he would be running in September 1987, he also had raised millions of dollars for his campaign fund. He surrendered his ministerial credentials and turned leadership of CBN over to his son, Tim. In 1987, he left the Southern Baptist Convention to run.

Robertson ran on a standard conservative platform, and as a candidate he embraced the same policies as Ronald Reagan: lower taxes, a balanced budget, and a strong defense.

Robertson's campaign achieved a strong second-place finish in the Iowa caucuses, ahead of Bush. He did poorly in the subsequent New Hampshire primary, however, and was unable to be competitive once the multiple-state primaries began. Robertson ended his campaign before the primaries were finished. His best finish was in Washington, winning the majority of caucus delegates.

=== Other ventures ===
Robertson was the founder and chairman of The Christian Broadcasting Network (CBN) Inc., and founder of International Family Entertainment Inc., Regent University, Operation Blessing International Relief and Development Corporation, American Center for Law and Justice, The Flying Hospital, Inc., and several other organizations and broadcast entities. Robertson was the founder and co-chairman of International Family Entertainment Inc. (IFE).

Formed in 1990, IFE produced and distributed family entertainment and information programming worldwide. IFE's principal business was The Family Channel, a satellite delivered cable-television network with 63 million U.S. subscribers. IFE, a publicly held company listed on the New York Stock Exchange, was sold in 1997 to Fox Kids Worldwide, Inc. for $1.9 billion, whereupon it was renamed Fox Family Channel. Disney acquired FFC in 2001 and its name was changed again, to ABC Family. The network was renamed to Freeform on January 12, 2016, though Robertson's sale of the channel continues to require Freeform to carry three hours of CBN/700 Club programming per weekday, along with CBN's yearly telethon for twelve hours.

Robertson was a global businessman with media holdings in Asia, the United Kingdom, and Africa. He struck a deal with Pittsburgh, Pennsylvania-based General Nutrition Center to produce and market a weight-loss shake he created and promoted on The 700 Club.

In 1999, Robertson entered into a joint venture with the Bank of Scotland to provide financial services in the United States. However, the venture fell through as it was met with criticism from civil rights groups in the UK, owing to Robertson's controversial views on homosexuality. The Bank was forced to cancel the deal when Robertson described Scotland as a "dark land overrun by homosexuals".

While some have estimated his wealth to have been between $200 million and $1 billion, Robertson claimed that these estimates were not based on any facts and were incorrect.

A June 2, 1999, article in The Virginian-Pilot alleged that Robertson had business dealings with Liberian president Charles Taylor, with whom Robertson, according to the article, negotiated a multimillion-dollar contract for gold mining operations in Liberia. Robertson denied any business dealings with Taylor, and he also denied ever speaking to President George W. Bush about Taylor's alleged activities. On February 4, 2010, at his war crimes trial in the Hague, Taylor testified that Robertson was his main political ally in the U.S., while Robertson has denied ever meeting or speaking to Charles Taylor.

Beginning in the latter part of the 1990s, Robertson raced thoroughbred horses under the nom de course Tega Farm. His gelding named Tappat won the 1999 Walter Haight Handicap at Laurel Park and the 2000 Pennsylvania Governor's Cup Handicap at Penn National Race Course. Following this success, Robertson paid $520,000 for a colt he named Mr. Pat. Trained by John Kimmel, Mr. Pat was not a successful runner. He was nominated for, but did not run in, the 2000 Kentucky Derby.

== Controversies ==
As a commentator and minister, Robertson's statements frequently generated controversy.

Robertson's service as a minister included the belief in the healing power of God. He cautioned believers that some Protestant denominations may harbor the spirit of the Antichrist; denounced Hinduism as "demonic" and Islam as "Satanic".

Robertson's belief in, and promotion of, conspiracy theories was controversial. His influential 1991 book The New World Order promoted conspiracies regarding the New World Order and the Illuminati. In 1995, his views made the news when a review in The New York Review of Books argued that Robertson's beliefs were antisemitic; others stated that Robertson, at the least, used antisemitic sources or wording.

Robertson denounced left-wing views of feminism, activism regarding homosexuality, abortion, and liberal college professors. Critics claim Robertson had business dealings in Africa with former president of Liberia and convicted war criminal Charles Taylor, and former Zaire president Mobutu Sese Seko, both of whom had been globally denounced for claims of human rights violations. Robertson was criticized worldwide for his call for Hugo Chávez's assassination, and for his remarks concerning Ariel Sharon's ill health as an act of God.

During the week of September 11, 2001, Robertson interviewed Jerry Falwell, who expressed his own opinion that "the ACLU has to take a lot of blame for this" in addition to "the pagans, and the abortionists, and the feminists, and the gays, and the lesbians [who have] helped [the terror attacks of September 11th] happen." Robertson replied, "I totally concur". Both evangelists were seriously criticized by President George W. Bush for their comments, for which Falwell later issued an apology.

Less than two weeks after Hurricane Katrina killed 1,836 people, Robertson implied on the September 12, 2005, broadcast of The 700 Club that the storm was God's punishment in response to America's abortion policy. He suggested that the September 11 attacks and the disaster in New Orleans "could [...] be connected in some way".

In 2006, Robertson claimed to have leg pressed 2,000 lbs three years earlier at the age of 73. Strength training experts reacted with skepticism. CBN attributed Robertson's energy and vitality to his "age-defying protein shake."

In 2009, Robertson said that Islam is "a violent political system bent on the overthrow of the governments of the world and world domination". He went on to elaborate that "you're dealing with not a religion, you're dealing with a political system, and I think we should treat it as such, and treat its adherents as such as we would members of the communist party, members of some fascist group".

Robertson's response to the 2010 Haiti earthquake also sparked worldwide condemnation. Robertson claimed that Haiti's founders had sworn a "pact to the Devil" in order to liberate themselves from the French slave owners and indirectly attributed the earthquake to the consequences of the Haitian people being "cursed" for doing so. CBN later issued a statement saying that Robertson's comments "were based on the widely-discussed 1791 slave rebellion led by Dutty Boukman at Bois Caïman, where the slaves allegedly made a famous pact with the devil in exchange for victory over the French". Various figures in mainline and evangelical Christianity have on occasion disavowed some of Robertson's remarks.

In March 2015, Robertson compared Buddhism to a disease on The 700 Club. The American Center for Law and Justice (ACLJ), a conservative Christian watchdog group Robertson founded to promote Christian prayer in public schools, called for a multi-pronged attack on mindfulness programs because "they appear to be similar to Buddhist religious practices. Proponents of secular mindfulness say mindfulness is not a Buddhist practice; it is a contemplative practice used in religious traditions around the world by many different names."

== Personal life ==
=== Marriage and family ===
In 1954, Robertson married Adelia "Dede" Elmer, a fashion model and beauty queen in the Miss Ohio State contest, who was studying for her master's degree in nursing at Yale University. She had also been a nursing student at Ohio State University in Columbus, Ohio. They remained married until her death in 2022, and had four children, among them Gordon P. Robertson.

=== Illness and death ===
On August 11, 2017, Robertson was hospitalized after sustaining minor injuries in a fall from a horseback riding incident.

On February 2, 2018, Robertson suffered an embolic stroke at his home in Virginia Beach. A member of his family noticed his symptoms and alerted emergency medical personnel. He was then taken to the nearest stroke center where he was administered the clot-busting drug tPA. Robertson was responsive, awake, and moving all of his limbs about eighty minutes after his stroke began. He was discharged two days later and recovered at home. Following this incident, Robertson and his family thanked the paramedics and medical staff for their "extraordinary care and rapid response." They also urged people to learn about stroke, its symptoms and treatments. Robertson resumed his hosting duties on The 700 Club on February 12, 2018.

In June 2019, Robertson was absent from The 700 Club for several days after he broke three ribs in a fall. Upon his return, Robertson described the experience as very painful but said "Us old guys are tough, and we try to stay in there and keep on going." He then thanked viewers for their prayers.

On June 8, 2023, Robertson died at his home in Virginia Beach, Virginia, at the age of 93.

== Publications ==
Robertson's book The New World Order (1991) became a New York Times best seller. A review by Ephraim Radner, an Episcopalian professor of theology, stated:

In his published writings, especially his 1991 book The New World Order, Pat Robertson has propagated theories about a worldwide Jewish conspiracy. Michael Land raised the issue in February in The New York Times Book Review, and in April Jacob Heilbrun, writing in The New York Review of Books, cited chapter and verse of Robertson's borrowings from well-known anti-Semitic works.

The New World Order has been referred to by political scientists as the most influential recent work on the Illuminati, and has been described as "cover[ing] every internationalist conspiracy imaginable."

In October 2003, Robertson was interviewed by author Joel Mowbray about his book Dangerous Diplomacy, a book critical of the United States Department of State. Robertson said that Americans could change American diplomacy by ridding America of a large part of the State Department.

- Shout It from the Housetops, an autobiography with Jamie Buckingham (1972, repr 1995) ISBN 978-0912106304
- My Prayer for You (1977) ISBN 978-0800752644
- The Secret Kingdom (1982) ISBN 978-0840752727
- Answers to 200 of Life's Most Probing Questions (1984) ISBN 0-8407-5465-5
- Beyond Reason: How Miracles can Change your Life (1985) ISBN 0-688-02214-6
- America's Dates with Destiny (1986) ISBN 0-8407-7756-6
- The Plan (1989) ISBN 0-8407-7227-0
- The New Millennium (1990) ISBN 978-0849908378
- The New World Order (1991) ISBN 0-8499-0915-5
- Turning Tide: The Fall of Liberalism and the Rise of Common Sense (1993) ISBN 978-0-8499-0972-6
- The End of the Age (1995, fiction) ISBN 0-8499-1290-3
- Six Steps to Spiritual Revival: God's Awesome Power in Your Life (2002) ISBN 978-1-59052-055-0
- Bring It on: Tough Questions, Candid Answers, Nashville, Tenn: W Pub. Group, 2003. ISBN 978-0-8499-1801-8
- The Ten Offenses (2004) ISBN 978-0849918018
- Courting Disaster (2004) ISBN 1-59145-142-6
- Miracles Can Be Yours Today (2006) ISBN 1-59145-423-9
- On Humility (2009) ISBN 978-0312376383
- Right on the Money: Financial Advice for Tough Times (2009) ISBN 978-0446549585
- I Have Walked With the Living God (2020) ISBN 978-1-6299-9873-2
- The Power of the Holy Spirit in You: Understanding the Miraculous Power of God (2022) ISBN 978-1-6845-1251-5
- The Shepherd King: The Life of David (2023) ISBN 978-0998615707

== See also ==
- Christian fundamentalism
- Christian right
- Christian Zionism
- Islamophobia in the United States
- Moral Majority
- Religious intolerance
