= New World Order conspiracy theory =

Conspiracy theory regarding a totalitarian world government

The reverse side of the Great Seal of the United States (1776). The Latin phrase novus ordo seclorum, appearing on the reverse side of the Great Seal since 1782 and on the back of the U.S. one-dollar bill since 1935, translates to "New Order of the Ages", and alludes to the beginning of an era where the United States of America is an independent nation-state; conspiracy theorists claim this is an allusion to the "New World Order".

The New World Order (NWO) is a term often used in conspiracy theories which speculate about a secretly emerging totalitarian world government. The common theme in conspiracy theories about a New World Order is that a secretive power elite with a globalist agenda is conspiring to eventually rule the world through an authoritarian one-world government—which will replace sovereign nation-states—and an all-encompassing propaganda whose ideology hails the establishment of the New World Order as the culmination of history's progress. Many influential historical and contemporary figures have therefore been alleged to be part of a cabal that operates through numerous front organizations to orchestrate significant political, social and economic events, including taking advantage of crises or even causing them in order to push through controversial policies at both national and international levels, as steps in an ongoing plot to achieve world domination.

Before the early 1990s, New World Order conspiracism was limited to two American countercultures, primarily the militantly anti-government right, and secondarily the part of fundamentalist Christianity concerned with the eschatological end-time emergence of the Antichrist. Academics who study conspiracy theories and religious extremism, such as Michael Barkun and Chip Berlet, observed that right-wing populist conspiracy theories about a New World Order not only have been embraced by many seekers of stigmatized knowledge but also have seeped into popular culture, thereby fueling a surge of interest and participation in survivalism and paramilitarism as many people actively prepare for apocalyptic and millenarian scenarios. These political scientists warn that mass hysteria over New World Order conspiracy theories could eventually have devastating effects on American political life, ranging from escalating lone wolf terrorism to the rise to power of authoritarian ultranationalist demagogues.

== History of the term ==
=== General usage (pre-Cold War) ===
During the 20th century, political figures such as Woodrow Wilson and Winston Churchill used the term "new world order" to refer to a new period of history characterized by a dramatic change in world political thought and in the global balance of power after World War I and World War II. The interwar and post-World War II period were seen as opportunities to implement idealistic proposals for global governance by collective efforts to address worldwide problems that go beyond the capacity of individual nation-states to resolve, while nevertheless respecting the right of nations to self-determination. Such collective initiatives manifested in the formation of intergovernmental organizations such as the League of Nations in 1920, the United Nations (UN) in 1945, and the North Atlantic Treaty Organization (NATO) in 1949, along with international regimes such as the Bretton Woods system and the General Agreement on Tariffs and Trade (GATT), implemented to maintain a cooperative balance of power and facilitate reconciliation between nations to prevent the prospect of another global conflict. These cosmopolitan efforts to instill liberal internationalism were regularly criticized and opposed by American paleoconservative business nationalists from the 1930s on.

Progressives welcomed international organizations and regimes such as the United Nations in the aftermath of the two World Wars, but argued that these initiatives suffered from a democratic deficit and were therefore inadequate not only to prevent another world war, but also to foster global justice, as the UN was chartered to be a free association of sovereign nation-states rather than a transition to democratic world government. Thus, cosmopolitan activists around the globe, perceiving the IGOs as too ineffectual for global change, formed a world federalist movement.

British writer and futurist H. G. Wells went further than progressives in the 1940s, by appropriating and redefining the term "new world order" as a synonym for the establishment of a technocratic world state and of a planned economy, garnering popularity in state socialist circles.

=== Usage as reference to a conspiracy (Cold War era) ===
During the Second Red Scare, both secular and Christian right American agitators, largely influenced by the work of Canadian conspiracy theorist William Guy Carr, increasingly embraced and spread dubious fears of Freemasons, Illuminati and Jews as the alleged driving forces behind an "international communist conspiracy". The threat of "Godless communism", in the form of an atheistic, bureaucratic collectivist world government, demonized as the "Red Menace", became the focus of apocalyptic millenarian conspiracism. The Red Scare came to shape one of the core ideas of the political right in the United States, which is that liberals and progressives, with their welfare-state policies and international cooperation programs such as foreign aid, supposedly contribute to a gradual process of global collectivism that will inevitably lead to nations being replaced with a communistic/collectivist one-world government. James Warburg, appearing before the United States Senate Committee on Foreign Relations in 1950, famously stated: "We shall have world government, whether or not we like it. The question is only whether world government will be achieved by consent or by conquest."

Right-wing populist advocacy groups with a paleoconservative world-view, such as the John Birch Society (JBS), disseminated a multitude of conspiracy theories in the 1960s claiming that the governments of both the United States and the Soviet Union were controlled by a cabal of corporate internationalists, "greedy" bankers and corrupt politicians who were intent on using the UN as the vehicle to create a "One World Government". This anti-globalist conspiracism fueled the campaign for U.S. withdrawal from the UN, given the United Nations were viewed as a manifestation of a malevolent and shadowy international government seeking world domination. American writer Mary M. Davison, in her booklet The Profound Revolution (1966), traced the alleged New World Order conspiracy to the establishment of the U.S. Federal Reserve in 1913 by international bankers, whom she claimed later formed the Council on Foreign Relations in 1921 as a shadow government. At the time the booklet was published, many readers would have interpreted "international bankers" as a reference to a postulated "international Jewish banking conspiracy" masterminded by the Rothschild family.

Arguing that the term "New World Order" is used by a secretive global elite dedicated to the eradication of the sovereignty of the world's nations, American writer Gary Allen—in his books None Dare Call It Conspiracy (1971), Rockefeller: Campaigning for the New World Order (1974), and Say "No!" to the New World Order (1987)—articulated the anti-globalist theme of contemporary right-wing conspiracism in the U.S. After the fall of communism in the early 1990s, the de facto subject of New World Order conspiracism shifted from crypto-communists, perceived to be plotting to establish an atheistic world communist government, to globalists, perceived to be plotting to implement a collectivist generally, unified world government ultimately controlled by an untouchable oligarchy of international bankers, corrupt politicians, and corporatists, or the United Nations itself. The shift in perception was inspired by growing opposition to corporate internationalism on the American right in the 1990s.

In his speech, Toward a New World Order, delivered on 11 September 1990 during a joint session of the US Congress, President George H. W. Bush described his objectives for post-Cold War global governance in cooperation with post-Soviet states. He stated:

Until now, the world we've known has been a world divided—a world of barbed wire and concrete block, conflict, and the cold war. Now, we can see a new world coming into view. A world in which there is the genuine prospect of new world order. In the words of Winston Churchill, a "world order" in which "the principles of justice and fair play ... protect the weak against the strong ..." A world where the United Nations, freed from cold war stalemate, is poised to fulfill the historic vision of its founders. A world in which freedom and respect for human rights find a home among all nations.

The New York Times observed that progressives were denouncing this new world order as a rationalization of American imperial ambitions in the Middle East at the time. At the same time conservatives rejected any new security arrangements altogether and fulminated about any possibility of a UN revival. Chip Berlet, an American investigative reporter specializing in the study of right-wing movements in the US, wrote that the Christian and secular far-right were especially terrified by Bush's speech. Fundamentalist Christian groups interpreted Bush's words as signaling the End Times. At the same time, more secular theorists approached it from an anti-communist and anti-collectivist standpoint and feared for hegemony over all countries by the United Nations.

=== Post-Cold War usage ===
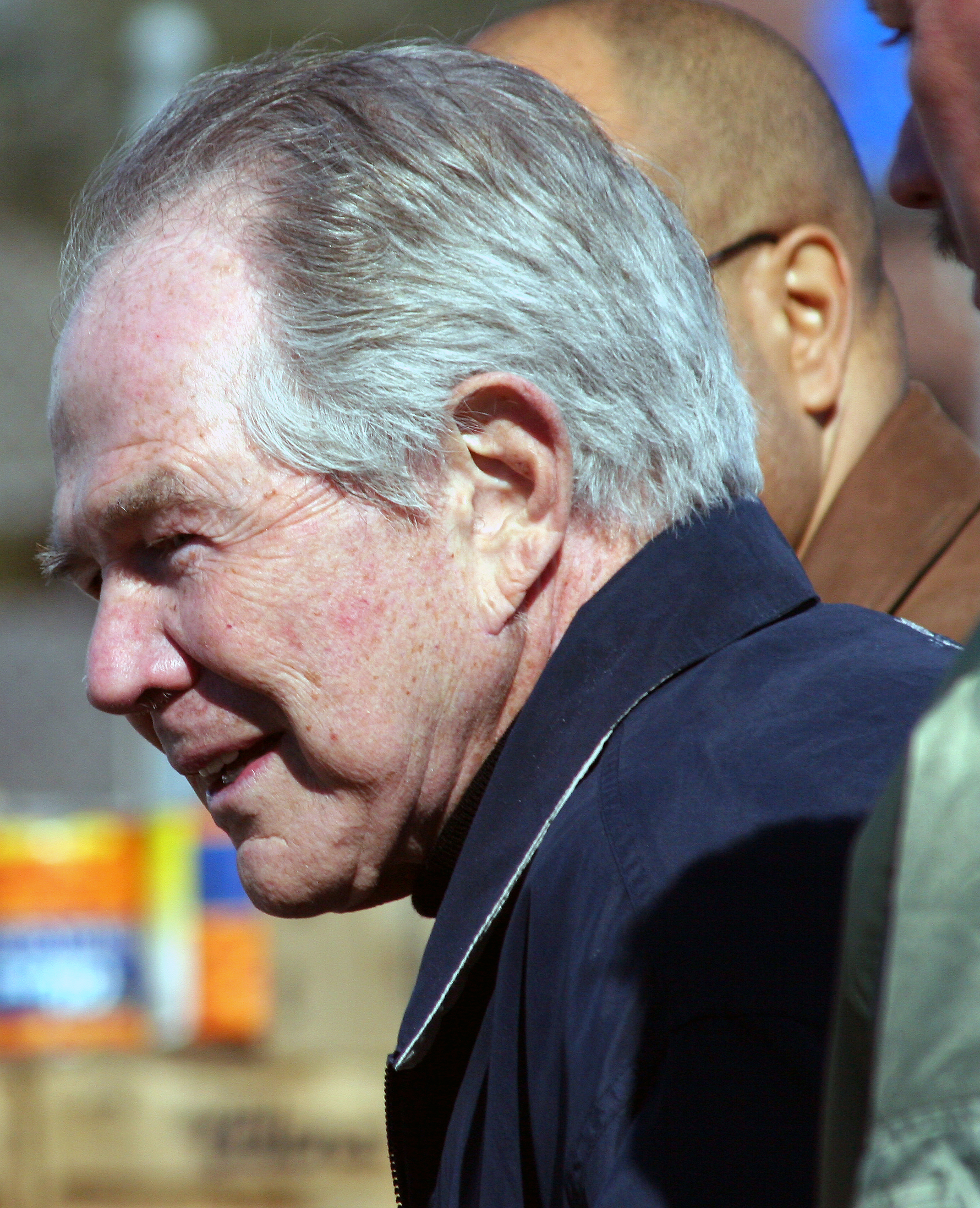
American televangelist Pat Robertson wrote the best-selling book The New World Order (1991).

The New World Order has been a focus of the American Christian right, and specifically the Protestant right. The NWO is seen as a prophesied anti-Christian enemy established by globalists which uses perceived secular philosophies such as environmentalism, feminism, and socialism (collectively referred to as globalism) to thwart Christianity through the work of organizations such as the United Nations, European Union, World Trade Organization, and World Health Organization. Organizations like the UN, as well as concepts such as the New World Order and globalism have played a significant role in right-wing Protestant prophecy media.

American televangelist Pat Robertson, with his best-selling book The New World Order (1991), became the most prominent Christian disseminator of conspiracy theories about recent American history. He describes a scenario where Wall Street, the Federal Reserve System, the Council on Foreign Relations, the Bilderberg Group and the Trilateral Commission control the flow of events from behind the scenes, constantly nudging people covertly in the direction of world government for the Antichrist. Scholar Myles Flores argues that the book, along with an earlier countercultural focus on the Illuminati and the John Birch Society's promotion of global elite conspiracies, "cemented the [New World Order] theory as a cornerstone within America’s conspiratorial culture."

It has been observed that, throughout the 1990s, the galvanizing language used by conspiracy theorists such as Linda Thompson, Mark Koernke and Robert K. Spear led to militancy and the rise of the American militia movement. The militia movement's anti-government ideology was spread through speeches at rallies and meetings, books and videotapes sold at gun shows, shortwave and satellite radio, fax networks, and computer bulletin boards. It has been argued that it was overnight AM radio shows and propagandistic viral content on the internet that most effectively contributed to more extremist responses to the perceived threat of the New World Order. This led to the substantial growth of New World Order conspiracism, with it retroactively finding its way into the previously apolitical literature of numerous Kennedy assassinologists, ufologists, lost land theorists and—partially inspired by fears surrounding the "Satanic panic"—occultists. From the mid-1990s onward, the amorphous appeal of those subcultures transmitted New World Order conspiracism to a larger audience of seekers of stigmatized knowledge, with the common characteristic of disillusionment of political efficacy.

From the mid-1990s to the early 2000s, Hollywood conspiracy-thriller television shows and films also played a role in introducing a general audience to various fringe, esoteric theories related to New World Order conspiracism—which by that point had developed to include black helicopters, FEMA "concentration camps", etc.—theories which for decades previously were confined to largely right-wing subcultures. The 1993–2002 television series The X-Files, the 1997 film Conspiracy Theory and the 1998 film The X-Files: Fight the Future are often cited as notable examples.

Following the start of the 21st century, and specifically during the 2008 financial crisis, many politicians and pundits, such as Gordon Brown and Henry Kissinger, used the term "new world order" in their advocacy for a comprehensive reform of the global financial system and their calls for a "New Bretton Woods" taking into account emerging markets such as China and India. These public declarations reinvigorated New World Order conspiracism, culminating in talk-show host Sean Hannity stating on his Fox News program Hannity that the "conspiracy theorists were right". Progressive media-watchdog groups have repeatedly criticized Fox News in general, and its now-defunct opinion show Glenn Beck in particular, for not only disseminating New World Order conspiracy theories to mainstream audiences, but possibly agitating so-called "lone wolf" extremism, particularly from the radical right.

In 2009, American film directors Luke Meyer and Andrew Neel released New World Order, a critically acclaimed documentary film which explores the world of conspiracy theorists—such as American radio host Alex Jones—who vigorously oppose what they perceive as an emerging New World Order. The growing dissemination and popularity of conspiracy theories has also created an alliance between right-wing agitators and hip hop music's left-wing rappers (such as KRS-One, Professor Griff of Public Enemy and Immortal Technique), illustrating how anti-elitist conspiracism can create unlikely political allies in efforts to oppose a political system.

== Conspiracy theories ==
There are numerous systemic conspiracy theories through which the concept of a New World Order is viewed. The following is a list of the major ones in roughly chronological order:

=== End time ===
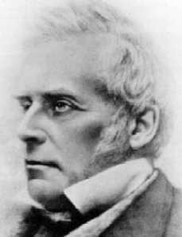
John Nelson Darby

Since the 19th century, many apocalyptic millennial Christian eschatologists, starting with John Nelson Darby, have predicted a globalist conspiracy to impose a tyrannical New World Order governing structure as the fulfillment of prophecies about the "end time" in the Bible, specifically in the Book of Ezekiel, the Book of Daniel, the Olivet Discourse found in the Synoptic Gospels, 2 Esdras 11:32 and Revelation 13:7. They claim that people who have made a deal with the Devil to gain wealth and power have become pawns in a supernatural chess game to move humanity into accepting a utopian world government that rests on the spiritual foundations of a syncretic-messianic world religion, which will later reveal itself to be a dystopian world empire that imposes the imperial cult of an "Unholy Trinity" of Satan, the Antichrist and the False Prophet. In many contemporary Christian conspiracy theories, the False Prophet will be either the last pope of the Catholic Church (groomed and installed by an Alta Vendita or Jesuit conspiracy), a guru from the New Age movement, or even the leader of an elite fundamentalist Christian organization like the Fellowship, while the Antichrist will be either the President of the European Union, the Caliph of a pan-Islamic state, or even the Secretary-General of the United Nations.

Some of the most vocal critics of end-time conspiracy theories come from within Christianity. In 1993, historian Bruce Barron wrote a stern rebuke of apocalyptic Christian conspiracism in the Christian Research Journal, when reviewing Robertson's 1991 book The New World Order. Another critique can be found in historian Gregory S. Camp's 1997 book Selling Fear: Conspiracy Theories and End-Times Paranoia. Religious studies scholar Richard T. Hughes argues that "New World Order" rhetoric libels the Christian faith, since the "New World Order" as defined by Christian conspiracy theorists has no basis in the Bible whatsoever. Furthermore, he argues that not only is this idea unbiblical, it is positively anti-biblical and fundamentally anti-Christian, because by misinterpreting key passages in the Book of Revelation, it turns a comforting message about the coming kingdom of God into one of fear, panic and despair in the face of an allegedly approaching one-world government. Progressive Christians, such as preacher-theologian Peter J. Gomes, caution Christian fundamentalists that a "spirit of fear" can distort scripture and history through dangerously combining biblical literalism, apocalyptic timetables, demonization and oppressive prejudices, while Camp warns of the "very real danger that Christians could pick up some extra spiritual baggage" by credulously embracing conspiracy theories. They therefore call on Christians who indulge in conspiracism to repent.

=== Freemasonry ===
Freemasonry is one of the world's oldest secular fraternal organizations and arose in Great Britain during the 18th century. Over the years, several allegations and conspiracy theories have been directed towards Freemasonry, including the allegation that Freemasons have a hidden political agenda and are conspiring to bring about a New World Order, a world government organized according to Masonic principles or governed only by Freemasons.

The esoteric nature of Masonic symbolism and rites led to Freemasons first being accused of secretly practicing Satanism in the late 18th century. The original allegation of a conspiracy within Freemasonry to subvert religions and governments to take over the world traces back to Scottish author John Robison, whose reactionary conspiracy theories crossed the Atlantic and influenced outbreaks of Protestant anti-Masonry in the United States during the 19th century. In the 1890s, French writer Léo Taxil wrote a series of pamphlets and books denouncing Freemasonry and charging their lodges with worshiping Lucifer as the Supreme Being and Great Architect of the Universe. Despite the fact that Taxil admitted that his claims were all a hoax, they were and still are believed and repeated by numerous conspiracy theorists and had a huge influence on subsequent anti-Masonic claims about Freemasonry.

Some conspiracy theorists eventually speculated that some Founding Fathers of the United States, such as George Washington and Benjamin Franklin, were having Masonic sacred geometric designs interwoven into American society, particularly in the Great Seal of the United States, the United States one-dollar bill, the architecture of National Mall landmarks and the streets and highways of Washington, D.C., as part of a master plan to create the first "Masonic government" as a model for the coming New World Order.

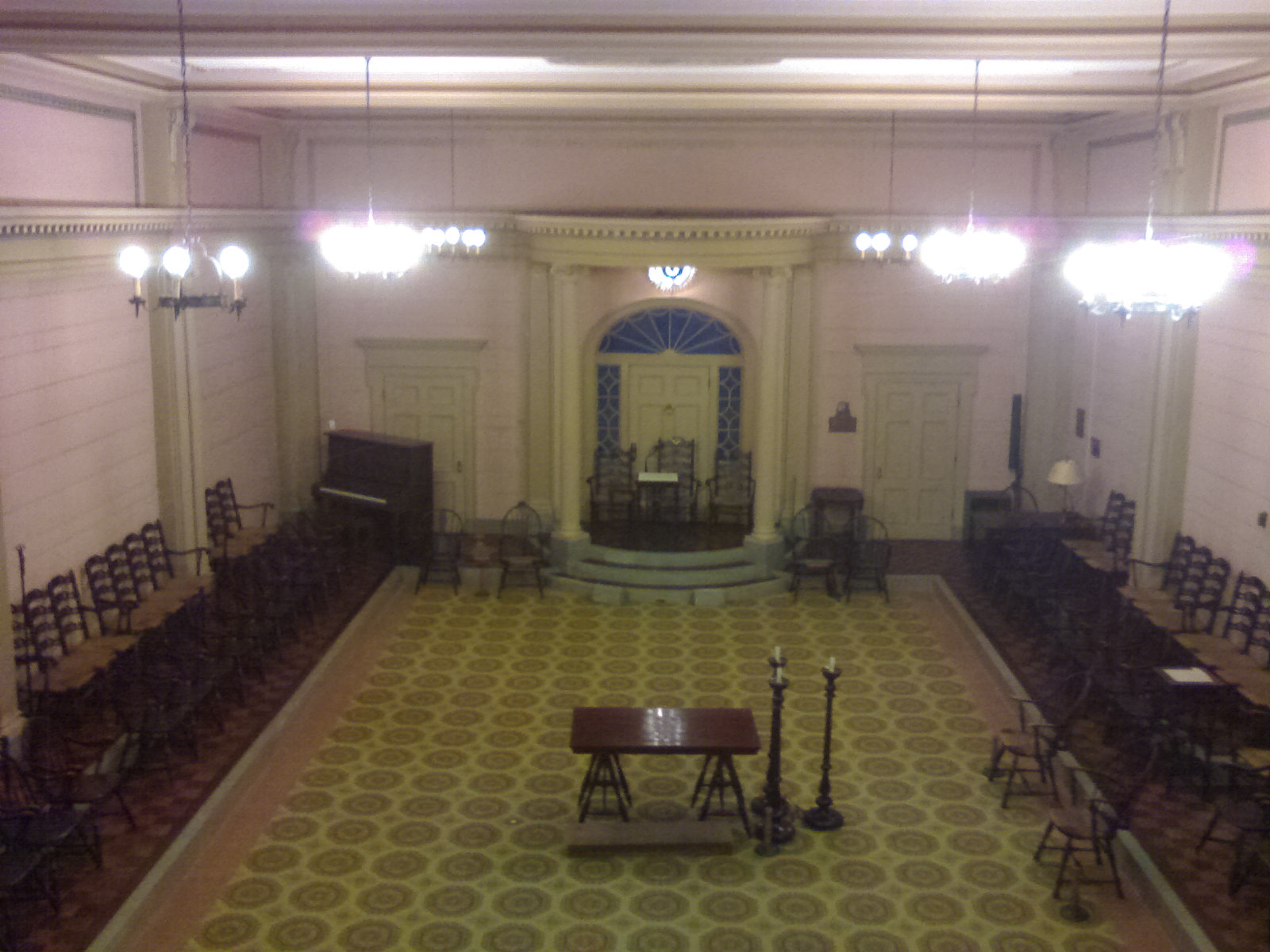
A Masonic Lodge room

Freemasons rebut these claims of a Masonic conspiracy. Freemasonry, which promotes rationalism, places no power in occult symbols themselves, and it is not a part of its principles to view the drawing of symbols, no matter how large, as an act of consolidating or controlling power. Furthermore, there is no published information establishing the Masonic membership of the men responsible for the design of the Great Seal. While conspiracy theorists assert that there are elements of Masonic influence on the Great Seal of the United States and that these elements were intentionally or unintentionally used because the creators were familiar with the symbols, in fact, the all-seeing Eye of Providence and the unfinished pyramid were symbols used as much outside Masonic lodges as within them in the late 18th century. Therefore, the designers were drawing from common esoteric symbols. The Latin phrase "novus ordo seclorum", appearing on the reverse side of the Great Seal since 1782 and the back of the one-dollar bill since 1935, translates to "New Order of the Ages", and alludes to the beginning of an era where the United States of America is an independent nation-state; conspiracy theorists often mistranslate it as "New World Order".

Although the European continental branch of Freemasonry has organizations that allow political discussion within their Masonic Lodges, Masonic researcher Trevor W. McKeown argues that the accusations ignore several facts. Firstly, the many Grand Lodges are independent and sovereign, meaning they act independently and do not have a common agenda. The points of belief of the various lodges often differ. Secondly, famous Freemasons have always held views that span the political spectrum and show no particular pattern or preference. As such, the term "Masonic government" is erroneous; there is no consensus among Freemasons about what an ideal government would look like.

=== Illuminati ===
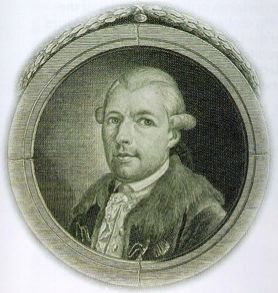
Adam Weishaupt, founder of the Illuminati, an 18th-century Bavarian liberal and secular secret society

The Order of the Illuminati was an Enlightenment-age secret society founded by university professor Adam Weishaupt on 1 May 1776, in Upper Bavaria, Germany. The movement consisted of advocates of freethought, secularism, liberalism, republicanism, and gender equality, recruited from the German Masonic Lodges, who sought to teach rationalism through mystery schools. In 1785, the order was infiltrated, broken up, and suppressed by the government agents of Charles Theodore, Elector of Bavaria, in his preemptive campaign to neutralize the threat of secret societies ever becoming hotbeds of conspiracies to overthrow the Bavarian monarchy and its state religion, Roman Catholicism. There is no evidence that the Bavarian Illuminati survived its suppression in 1785.

In the late 18th century, reactionary conspiracy theorists, such as Scottish physicist John Robison and French Jesuit priest Augustin Barruel, began speculating that the Illuminati had survived their suppression and become the masterminds behind the French Revolution and the Reign of Terror. The Illuminati were accused of being subversives who were attempting to secretly orchestrate a revolutionary wave in Europe and the rest of the world by spreading the most radical ideas and movements of the Enlightenment—anti-clericalism, anti-monarchism, and anti-patriarchalism— which the accusers feared would lead to the destruction of the natural order of things. During the 19th century, fear of an Illuminati conspiracy was a real concern of the European ruling classes, and their oppressive reactions to this unfounded fear provoked in 1848 the very revolutions they sought to prevent.

During the interwar period of the 20th century, fascist propagandists, such as British revisionist historian Nesta Helen Webster and American socialite Edith Starr Miller, not only popularized the myth of an Illuminati conspiracy but claimed that it was a subversive secret society which served the Jewish elites that supposedly propped up both finance capitalism and Soviet communism to divide and rule the world. American evangelist Gerald Burton Winrod and other conspiracy theorists within the fundamentalist Christian movement in the United States—which emerged in the 1910s as a backlash against the principles of Enlightenment secular humanism, modernism, and liberalism—became the main channel of dissemination of Illuminati conspiracy theories in the U.S.. Right-wing populists, such as members of the John Birch Society (JBS), subsequently began speculating that some collegiate fraternities (Skull and Bones), gentlemen's clubs (Bohemian Club), and think tanks (Council on Foreign Relations, Trilateral Commission) of the American upper class are front organizations of the Illuminati, which they accuse of plotting to create a New World Order through a one-world government. In his book Blood and Politics, Leonard Zeskind refers to JBS co-founder Revilo P. Oliver as "the person responsible for introducing the idea of a conspiracy by the Illuminati into Birch circles." The Illuminatus! Trilogy, a series of three satirical novels by American writers Robert Shea and Robert Anton Wilson, first published in 1975, which attributed the alleged major cover-ups of the era – such as who shot John F. Kennedy – to the Illuminati, was extremely influential in popularizing the myth of an Illuminati superconspiracy during the 1960s and onward.

=== The Protocols of the Elders of Zion ===
The Protocols of the Elders of Zion is an antisemitic canard, originally published in Russian in 1903, alleging a Judeo-Masonic conspiracy to achieve world domination. The text purports to be the minutes of the secret meetings of a cabal of Jewish masterminds, which has co-opted Freemasonry and is plotting to rule the world on behalf of all Jews because they believe themselves to be the chosen people of God. The Protocols incorporate many of the core conspiracist themes outlined in the Robison and Barruel attacks on the Freemasons and overlay them with antisemitic allegations about anti-Tsarist movements in Russia. The Protocols reflect themes similar to more general critiques of Enlightenment liberalism by conservative aristocrats who support monarchies and state religions. The interpretation intended by the publication of The Protocols is that if one peels away the layers of the Masonic conspiracy, past the Illuminati, one finds the rotten Jewish core.

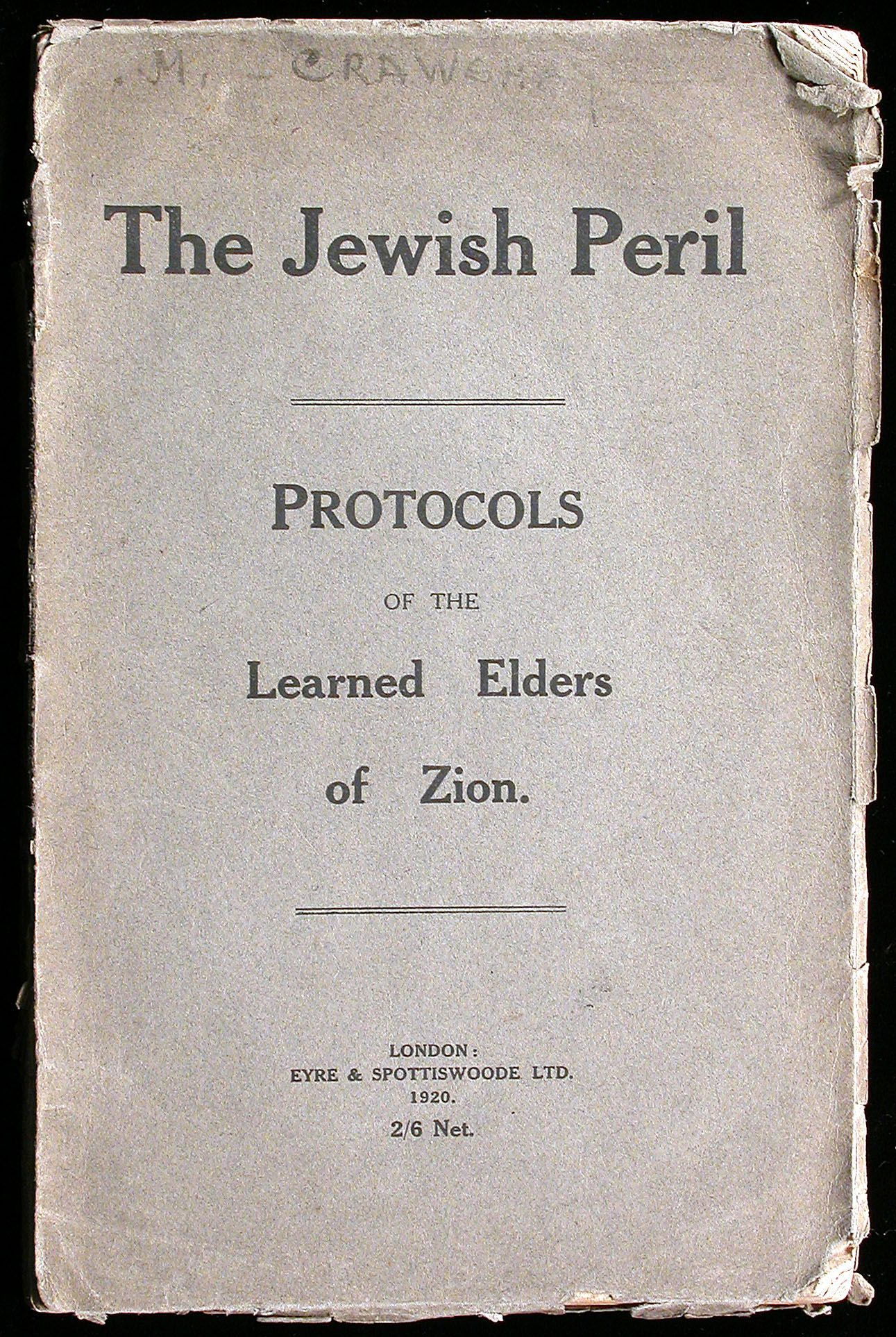
Cover of a 1920 copy of The Jewish Peril

Numerous polemicists, such as Irish journalist Philip Graves in a 1921 article in The Times, and British academic Norman Cohn in his 1967 book Warrant for Genocide, have proven The Protocols to be both a hoax and a clear case of plagiarism. There is general agreement that Russian-French writer and political activist Matvei Golovinski fabricated the text for Okhrana, the secret police of the Russian Empire, as a work of counter-revolutionary propaganda prior to the 1905 Russian Revolution, by plagiarizing, almost word for word in some passages, from The Dialogue in Hell Between Machiavelli and Montesquieu, a 19th-century satire against Napoleon III of France written by French political satirist and Legitimist militant Maurice Joly.

Responsible for feeding many antisemitic and anti-Masonic mass hysteria of the twentieth century, The Protocols has been influential in the development of some conspiracy theories, including some New World Order theories, and repeatedly appears in certain contemporary conspiracy literature. For example, the authors of the 1982 controversial book The Holy Blood and the Holy Grail concluded that The Protocols was the most persuasive piece of evidence for the existence and activities of the Priory of Sion. They speculated that this secret society was working behind the scenes to establish a theocratic "United States of Europe". Politically and religiously unified through the imperial cult of a Merovingian Great Monarch—supposedly descended from a Jesus bloodline—who occupies both the throne of Europe and the Holy See, this "Holy European Empire" would become the hyperpower of the 21st century. Although the Priory of Sion itself has been exhaustively debunked by journalists and scholars as a hoax, some apocalyptic millenarian Christian eschatologists who believe The Protocols is authentic became convinced that the Priory of Sion was a fulfillment of prophecies found in the Book of Revelation and further proof of an anti-Christian conspiracy of epic proportions signaling the imminence of a New World Order.

Skeptics argue that the current gambit of contemporary conspiracy theorists who use The Protocols is to claim that they "really" come from some group other than the Jews, such as fallen angels or alien invaders. Although it is hard to determine whether the conspiracy-minded actually believe this or are simply trying to sanitize a discredited text, skeptics argue that it does not make much difference, since they leave the actual, antisemitic text unchanged, giving The Protocols credibility and circulation.

=== Round table ===
During the second half of Britain's "imperial century" between 1815 and 1914, English-born South African businessman, mining magnate, and politician Cecil Rhodes advocated the British Empire reannexing the United States of America and reforming itself into an "Imperial Federation" to bring about a hyperpower and lasting world peace. In his first will, written in 1877 at the age of 23, he expressed his wish to fund a secret society (known as the Society of the Elect) that would advance this goal:

To and for the establishment, promotion and development of a Secret Society, the true aim and object whereof shall be for the extension of British rule throughout the world, the perfecting of a system of emigration from the United Kingdom, and of colonisation by British subjects of all lands where the means of livelihood are attainable by energy, labour and enterprise, and especially the occupation by British settlers of the entire Continent of Africa, the Holy Land, the Valley of the Euphrates, the Islands of Cyprus and Candia [Crete], the whole of South America, the Islands of the Pacific not heretofore possessed by Great Britain, the whole of the Malay Archipelago, the seaboard of China and Japan, the ultimate recovery of the United States of America as an integral part of the British Empire, the inauguration of a system of Colonial representation in the Imperial Parliament which may tend to weld together the disjointed members of the Empire and, finally, the foundation of so great a Power as to render wars impossible, and promote the best interests of humanity.

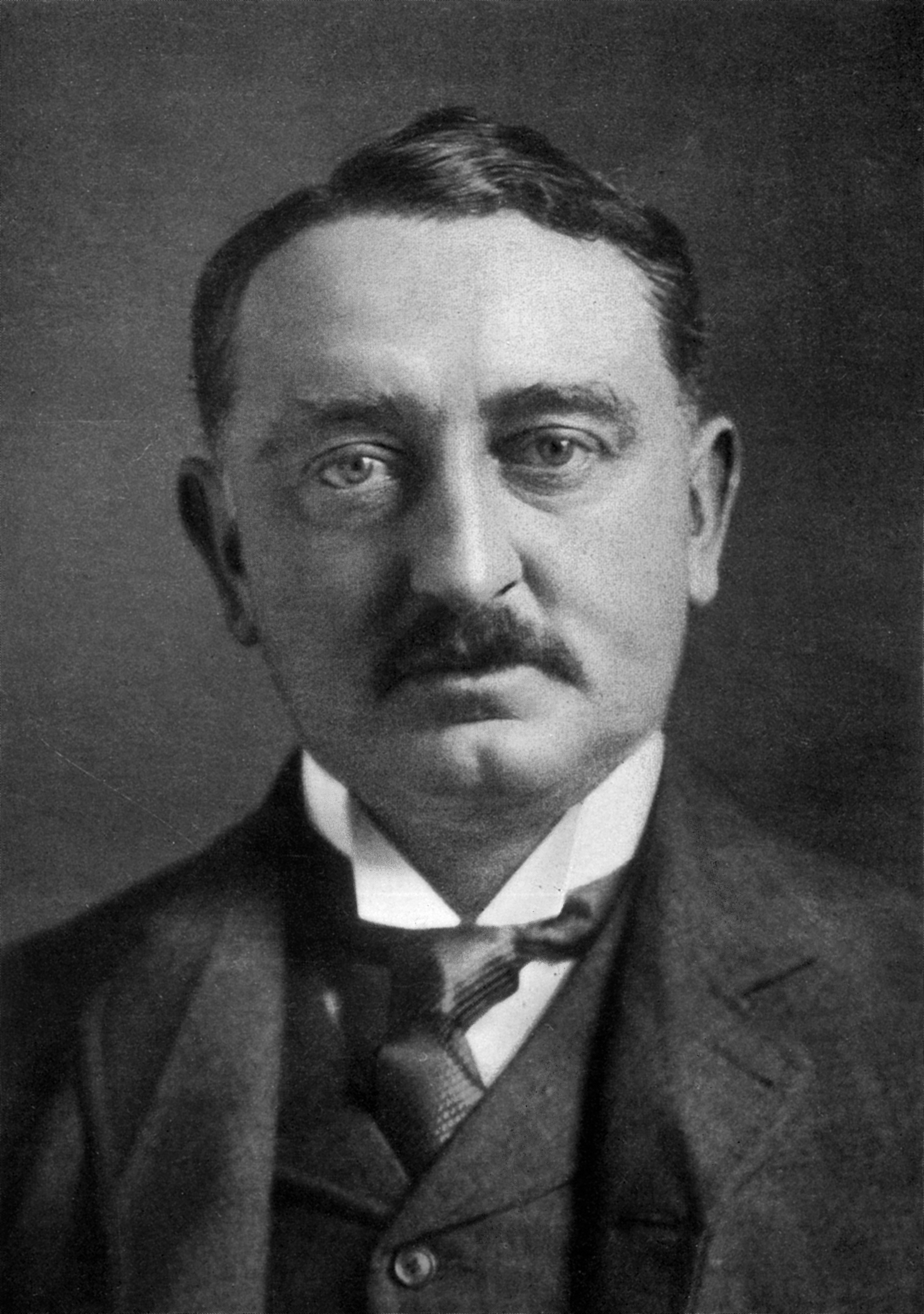
Magnate and colonist Cecil Rhodes advocated a secret society which would make Britain control the Earth.

In 1890, thirteen years after "his now-famous will," Rhodes elaborated on the same idea: establishment of "England everywhere," which would "ultimately lead to the cessation of all wars, and one language throughout the world." "The only thing feasible to carry out this idea is a secret society gradually absorbing the wealth of the world ["and human minds of the higher-order"] to be devoted to such an object."

Rhodes also concentrated on the Rhodes Scholarship, which had British statesman Alfred Milner as one of its trustees. Established in 1902, the original goal of the trust fund was to foster peace among the great powers by creating a sense of fraternity and a shared world view among future British, American, and German leaders by having enabled them to study for free at the University of Oxford.

Milner and British official Lionel George Curtis were the architects of the Round Table movement, a network of organizations promoting closer union between Britain and its self-governing colonies. To this end, Curtis founded the Royal Institute of International Affairs in June 1919 and, with his 1938 book The Commonwealth of God, began advocating for the creation of an imperial federation that eventually reannexes the U.S., which would be presented to Protestant churches as being the work of the Christian God to elicit their support. The Commonwealth of Nations was created in 1949, but it would only be a free association of independent states rather than the powerful imperial federation imagined by Rhodes, Milner, and Curtis.

The Council on Foreign Relations began in 1917 with a group of New York academics who were asked by President Woodrow Wilson to offer options for the foreign policy of the United States in the interwar period. Originally envisioned as a group of American and British scholars and diplomats, some of whom belonging to the Round Table movement, it was a subsequent group of 108 New York financiers, manufacturers, and international lawyers organized in June 1918 by Nobel Peace Prize recipient and U.S. secretary of state Elihu Root, that became the Council on Foreign Relations on 29 July 1921. The first of the council's projects was a quarterly journal launched in September 1922, called Foreign Affairs. The Trilateral Commission was founded in July 1973, at the initiative of American banker David Rockefeller, who was chairman of the Council on Foreign Relations at that time. It is a private organization established to foster closer cooperation among the United States, Europe, and Japan. The Trilateral Commission is widely seen as a counterpart to the Council on Foreign Relations.

In the 1960s, right-wing populist individuals and groups with a paleoconservative worldview, such as members of the John Birch Society, were the first to combine and spread a business nationalist critique of corporate internationalists networked through think tanks such as the Council on Foreign Relations with a grand conspiracy theory casting them as front organizations for the Round Table of the "Anglo-American Establishment", which are financed by an "international banking cabal" that has supposedly been plotting from the late 19th century on to impose an oligarchic new world order through a global financial system. Anti-globalist conspiracy theorists therefore fear that international bankers are planning to eventually subvert the independence of the U.S. by subordinating national sovereignty to a strengthened Bank for International Settlements.

The research findings of historian Carroll Quigley, author of the 1966 book Tragedy and Hope, are taken by both conspiracy theorists of the American Old Right (W. Cleon Skousen) and New Left (Carl Oglesby) to substantiate this view, even though Quigley argued that the Establishment is not involved in a plot to implement a one-world government but rather British and American "benevolent imperialism" driven by the mutual interests of economic elites in the United Kingdom and the United States. Quigley also argued that, although the Round Table still exists today, its position in influencing the policies of world leaders has been much reduced from its heyday during World War I and slowly waned after the end of World War II and the Suez Crisis. Today the Round Table is largely a ginger group, designed to consider and gradually influence the policies of the Commonwealth of Nations, but faces strong opposition. Furthermore, in American society after 1965, the problem, according to Quigley, was that no elite was in charge and acting responsibly.

Larry McDonald, the second president of the John Birch Society and a conservative Democratic member of the United States House of Representatives who represented the 7th congressional district of Georgia, wrote a foreword for Allen's 1976 book The Rockefeller File, wherein he claimed that the Rockefellers and their allies were driven by a desire to create a one-world government that combined "super-capitalism" with communism and would be fully under their control. He saw a conspiracy plot that was "international in scope, generations old in planning, and incredibly evil in intent."

In his 2002 autobiography Memoirs, David Rockefeller wrote:

For more than a century, ideological extremists at either end of the political spectrum have seized upon well-publicized incidents ... to attack the Rockefeller family for the inordinate influence they claim we wield over American political and economic institutions. Some even believe we are part of a secret cabal working against the best interests of the United States, characterizing my family and me as 'internationalists' and conspiring with others around the world to build a more integrated global political and economic structure—one world if you will. If that's the charge, I stand guilty, and I am proud of it.

Barkun argues that this statement is partly facetious (the claim of "conspiracy" and "treason") and partly serious—the desire to encourage trilateral cooperation among the U.S., Europe, and Japan; for example — an ideal that used to be a hallmark of the internationalist wing of the Republican Party (known as "Rockefeller Republicans" in honor of Nelson Rockefeller) when there was an internationalist wing. The statement, however, is taken at face value and widely cited by conspiracy theorists as proof that the Council on Foreign Relations uses its role as the brain trust of American presidents, senators and representatives to manipulate them into supporting a New World Order in the form of a one-world government.

In a 13 November 2007 interview with Canadian journalist Benjamin Fulford, Rockefeller countered that he felt no need for a world government and wished for the world's governments to work together and collaborate. He also stated that it seemed neither likely nor desirable to have only one elected government rule worldwide. He criticized accusations of him being "ruler of the world" as nonsensical.

Some American social critics, such as Laurence H. Shoup, argue that the Council on Foreign Relations is an "imperial brain trust" which has, for decades, played a central behind-the-scenes role in shaping U.S. foreign policy choices for the post-World War II international order and the Cold War by determining what options show up on the agenda and what options do not even make it to the table; others, such as G. William Domhoff, argue that it is in fact a mere policy discussion forum which provides the business input to U.S. foreign policy planning. Domhoff argues that "[i]t has nearly 3,000 members, far too many for secret plans to be kept within the group. All the council does is sponsor discussion groups, debates, and speakers. As far as being secretive, it issues annual reports and allows access to its historical archives." However, all these critics agree that "[h]istorical studies of the CFR show that it has a very different role in the overall power structure than what is claimed by conspiracy theorists."

=== The Open Conspiracy ===
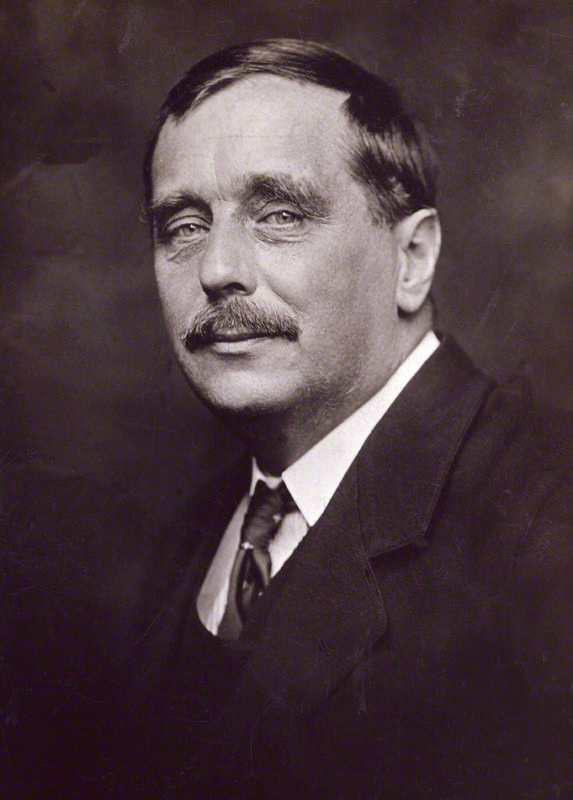
H. G. Wells wrote the books The Open Conspiracy and The New World Order.

In his 1928 book The Open Conspiracy British writer and futurist H. G. Wells promoted cosmopolitanism and offered blueprints for a world revolution and World Brain to establish a technocratic world state and planned economy. Wells warned, however, in his 1940 book The New World Order that:

... when the struggle seems to be drifting definitely towards a world social democracy, there may still be very great delays and disappointments before it becomes an efficient and beneficent world system. Countless people ... will hate the new world order, be rendered unhappy by the frustration of their passions and ambitions through its advent and will die protesting against it. When we attempt to evaluate its promise, we have to bear in mind the distress of a generation or so of malcontents, many of them quite gallant and graceful-looking people.

Wells's books were influential in giving a second meaning to the term "new world order", which would only be used by state socialist supporters and anti-communist opponents. However, despite the popularity and notoriety of his ideas, Wells failed to exert a deeper and more lasting influence because he was unable to concentrate his energies on a direct appeal to intelligentsias who would, ultimately, have to coordinate the Wellsian new world order.

=== New Age ===
British neo-Theosophical occultist Alice Bailey, one of the founders of the so-called New Age movement, prophesied in 1940 the eventual victory of the Allies of World War II over the Axis powers (which occurred in 1945) and the establishment by the Allies of a political and religious New World Order. She saw a federal world government as the culmination of Wells' Open Conspiracy but favorably argued that it would be synarchist because it was guided by the Masters of the Ancient Wisdom, intent on preparing humanity for the mystical second coming of Christ, and the dawning of the Age of Aquarius. According to Bailey, a group of ascended masters called the Great White Brotherhood works on the "inner planes" to oversee the transition to the New World Order but, for now, the members of this Spiritual Hierarchy are only known to a few occult scientists, with whom they communicate telepathically, but as the need for their personal involvement in the plan increases, there will be an "Externalization of the Hierarchy" and everyone will know of their presence on Earth.

Bailey's writings, along with American writer Marilyn Ferguson's 1980 book The Aquarian Conspiracy, contributed to conspiracy theorists of the Christian right viewing the New Age movement as the "false religion" that would supersede Christianity in a New World Order. Skeptics argue that the term "New Age movement" is a misnomer, generally used by conspiracy theorists as a catch-all rubric for any new religious movement that is not fundamentalist Christian. By this logic, anything that is not Christian is by definition actively and willfully anti-Christian.

Paradoxically, since the first decade of the 21st century, New World Order conspiracism is increasingly being embraced and propagandized by New Age occultists, who are people bored by rationalism and drawn to stigmatized knowledge—such as alternative medicine, astrology, quantum mysticism, spiritualism, and theosophy. Thus, New Age conspiracy theorists, such as the makers of documentary films like Esoteric Agenda, claim that globalists who plot on behalf of the New World Order are simply misusing occultism for Machiavellian ends, such as adopting 21 December 2012 as the exact date for the establishment of the New World Order to take advantage of the growing 2012 phenomenon, which has its origins in the fringe Mayanist theories of New Age writers José Argüelles, Terence McKenna, and Daniel Pinchbeck.

Skeptics argue that the connection of conspiracy theorists and occultists follows from their common fallacious premises. First, any widely accepted belief must necessarily be false. Second, stigmatized knowledge—what the Establishment spurns—must be true. The result is a large, self-referential network in which, for example, some UFO religionists promote anti-Jewish phobias while some antisemites practice Peruvian shamanism.

In 1994, the esoteric group the Order of the Solar Temple, in letters justifying their 1994 mass suicide, claimed they were being persecuted by the New World Order, and that this persecution was why they had been driven to mass suicide.

=== Fourth Reich ===
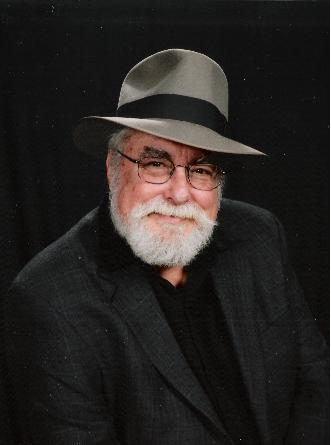
American writer Jim Marrs claimed that former Nazis and their sympathizers had been continuing Nazi policies worldwide, especially in the United States.

Conspiracy theorists often use the term "Fourth Reich" simply as a pejorative synonym for the "New World Order" to imply that its state ideology and government will be similar to Germany's Third Reich.

Conspiracy theorists, such as American writer Jim Marrs, claim that some ex-Nazis, who survived the fall of the Greater German Reich, along with sympathizers in the United States and elsewhere, given haven by organizations like ODESSA and Die Spinne, has been working behind the scenes since the end of World War II to enact at least some principles of Nazism (e.g., militarism, imperialism, widespread spying on citizens, corporatism, the use of propaganda to manufacture a national consensus) into culture, government, and business worldwide, but primarily in the U.S. They cite the influence of ex-Nazi scientists brought in under Operation Paperclip to help advance aerospace manufacturing in the U.S. with technological principles from Nazi UFOs, and the acquisition and creation of conglomerates by ex-Nazis and their sympathizers after the war, in both Europe and the U.S.

This neo-Nazi conspiracy is said to be animated by an "Iron Dream" in which the American Empire, having thwarted the Judeo-Masonic conspiracy and overthrown its Zionist Occupation Government, gradually establishes a Fourth Reich formerly known as the "Western Imperium"—a pan-Aryan world empire modeled after Adolf Hitler's New Order—which reverses the "decline of the West" and ushers a golden age of white supremacy.

Skeptics argue that conspiracy theorists grossly overestimate the influence of ex-Nazis and neo-Nazis on American society and point out that political repression at home and imperialism abroad have a long history in the United States that predates the 20th century. Political theorist Sheldon Wolin has expressed concern that the twin forces of democratic deficit and superpower status have paved the way in the U.S. for the emergence of an inverted totalitarianism which contradicts many principles of Nazism.

=== Alien invasion ===
Since the late 1970s, extraterrestrials from other habitable planets or parallel dimensions (such as "Greys") and intraterrestrials from Hollow Earth (such as "Reptilians") have been included in the New World Order conspiracy, in more or less dominant roles, as in the theories put forward by American writers Stan Deyo and Milton William Cooper, and British writer David Icke.

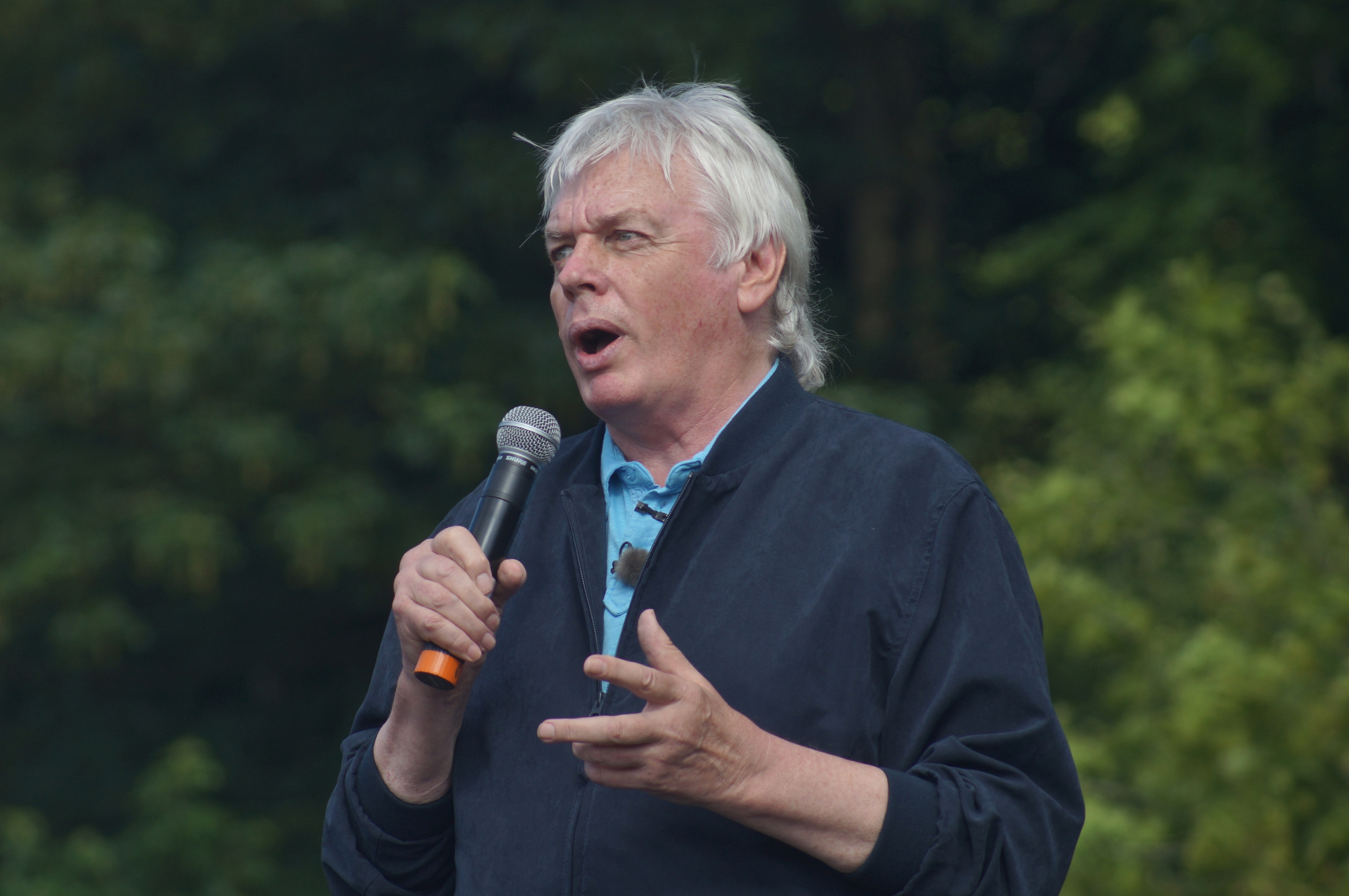
British writer David Icke believes that shapeshifting reptilian aliens control the Earth.

The common theme in these conspiracy theories is that aliens have been among us for decades, centuries or millennia. Still, a government cover-up enforced by "Men in black" has shielded the public from knowledge of a secret alien invasion. Motivated by speciesism and imperialism, these aliens have been and are secretly manipulating developments and changes in human society to more efficiently control and exploit human beings. In some theories, alien infiltrators have shapeshifted into human form and move freely throughout human society, even to the point of taking control of command positions in governmental, corporate, and religious institutions, and are now in the final stages of their plan to take over the world. A mythical covert government agency of the United States code-named Majestic 12 is often imagined being the shadow government which collaborates with the alien occupation and permits alien abductions, in exchange for assistance in the development and testing of military "flying saucers" at Area 51, for United States armed forces to achieve full-spectrum dominance.

Those who adhere to the psychosocial hypothesis for unidentified flying objects argue that the convergence of New World Order conspiracy theory and UFO conspiracy theory is a product of not only the era's widespread mistrust of governments and the popularity of the extraterrestrial hypothesis for UFOs but of the far right and ufologists joining forces. Barkun notes that the only positive side to this development is that, if conspirators plotting to rule the world are believed to be aliens, traditional human scapegoats (Freemasons, Illuminati, Jews, etc.) are downgraded or exonerated.

=== Brave New World ===
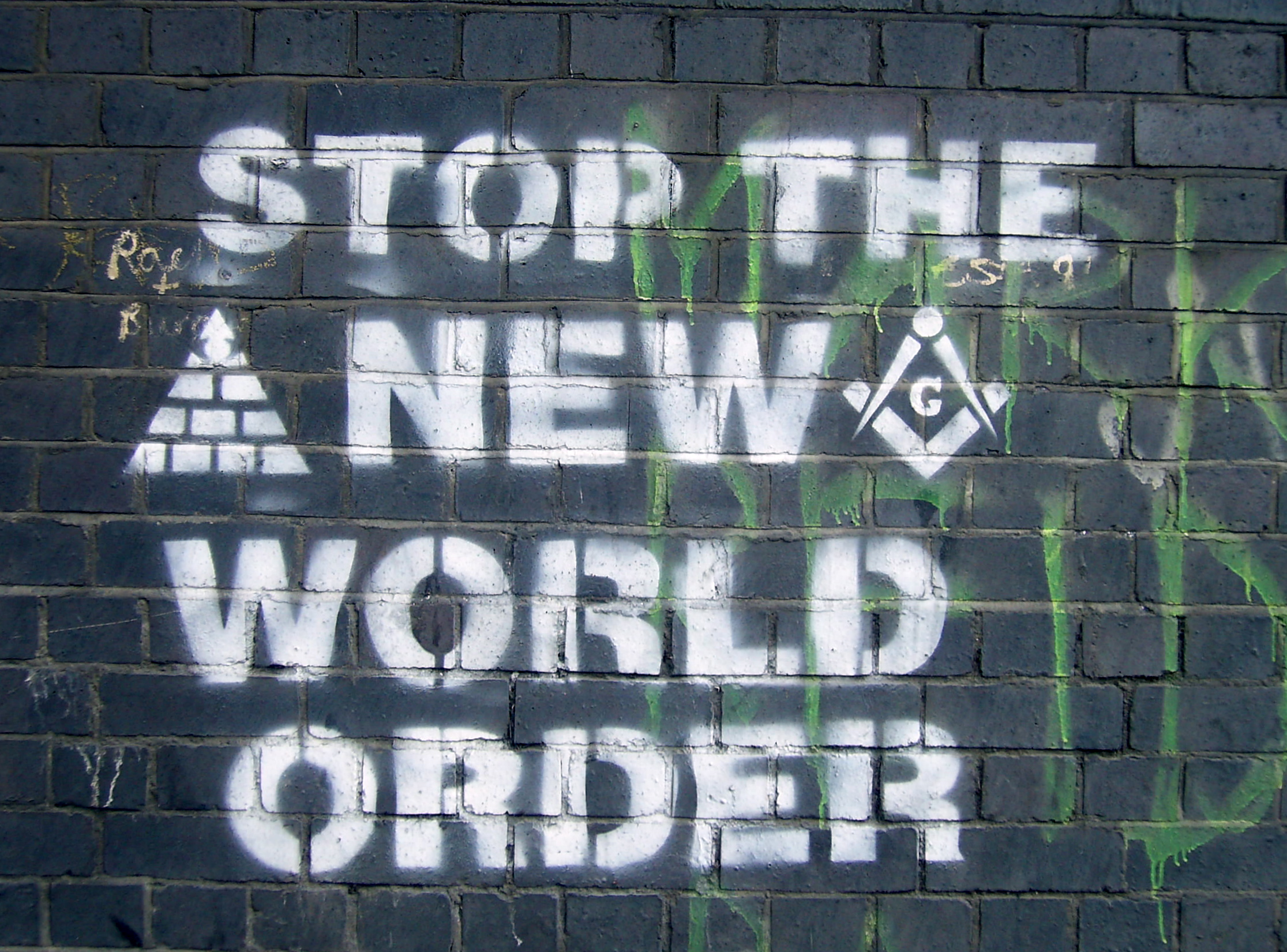
2007 graffiti on a brick wall: "Stop The New World Order"

Antiscience and neo-Luddite conspiracy theorists emphasize technology forecasting in their New World Order conspiracy theories. They speculate that the global power elite are reactionary modernists pursuing a transhumanist plan to develop and use human enhancement technologies to become a "posthuman ruling caste", while change accelerates toward a technological singularity—a theorized future point of discontinuity when events will accelerate at such a pace that normal unenhanced humans will be unable to predict or even understand the rapid changes occurring in the world around them. Conspiracy theorists fear the outcome will either be the emergence of a Brave New World–like dystopia—a "Brave New World Order"—or the extinction of the human species.

Democratic transhumanists, such as American sociologist James Hughes, counter that many influential members of the United States establishment are bioconservatives strongly opposed to human enhancement, as demonstrated by President Bush's Council on Bioethics's proposed international treaty prohibiting human cloning and germline engineering. Furthermore, he argues that conspiracy theorists underestimate how fringe the transhumanist movement really is.

== Postulated implementations ==
Just as there are several overlapping or conflicting theories among conspiracists about the nature of the New World Order, so are there several beliefs about how its architects and planners will implement it:

=== Gradualism ===
Conspiracy theorists generally speculate that the New World Order is being implemented gradually, citing the formation of the U.S. Federal Reserve System in 1913; the League of Nations in 1919; the International Monetary Fund in 1944; the United Nations in 1945; the World Bank in 1945; the World Health Organization in 1948; the European Union and the Euro in 1993; the World Trade Organization in 1998; the African Union in 2002, and the Union of South American Nations in 2008 as major milestones.

An increasingly popular conspiracy theory among American right-wing populists is that the hypothetical North American Union and the amero currency, proposed by the Council on Foreign Relations and its counterparts in Mexico and Canada, will be the next milestone in the implementation of the New World Order. The theory holds that a group of shadowy and mostly nameless international elites is planning to replace the federal government of the United States with a transnational government. Therefore, conspiracy theorists believe the borders between Mexico, Canada, and the United States are in the process of being erased, covertly, by a group of globalists whose ultimate goal is to replace national governments in Washington, D.C., Ottawa, and Mexico City with a European-style political union and a bloated E.U.-style bureaucracy.

Skeptics argue that the North American Union exists only as a proposal contained in one of a thousand academic and policy papers published each year that advocate all manner of idealistic but ultimately unrealistic approaches to social, economic, and political problems. Most of these are passed around in their circles and eventually filed away and forgotten by junior staffers in congressional offices. However, some of these papers become touchstones for the conspiracy-minded and form the basis of all kinds of unfounded xenophobic fears, especially during times of economic anxiety.

For example, in March 2009, due to the 2008 financial crisis, the People's Republic of China and the Russian Federation pressed for urgent consideration of a new international reserve currency and the United Nations Conference on Trade and Development proposed greatly expanding the I.M.F.'s special drawing rights. Conspiracy theorists fear these proposals are a call for the U.S. to adopt a single global currency for a New World Order.

Judging that both national governments and global institutions have proven ineffective in addressing global problems that go beyond the capacity of individual nation-states to solve, some political scientists critical of New World Order conspiracism, such as Mark C. Partridge, argue that regionalism will be the major force in the coming decades, pockets of power around regional centers: Western Europe around Brussels, the Western Hemisphere around Washington, D.C., East Asia around Beijing, and Eastern Europe around Moscow. As such, the E.U., the Shanghai Cooperation Organisation, and the G-20 will likely become more influential as time progresses. The question then is not whether global governance is gradually emerging, but rather how will these regional powers interact with one another.

=== Coup d'état ===
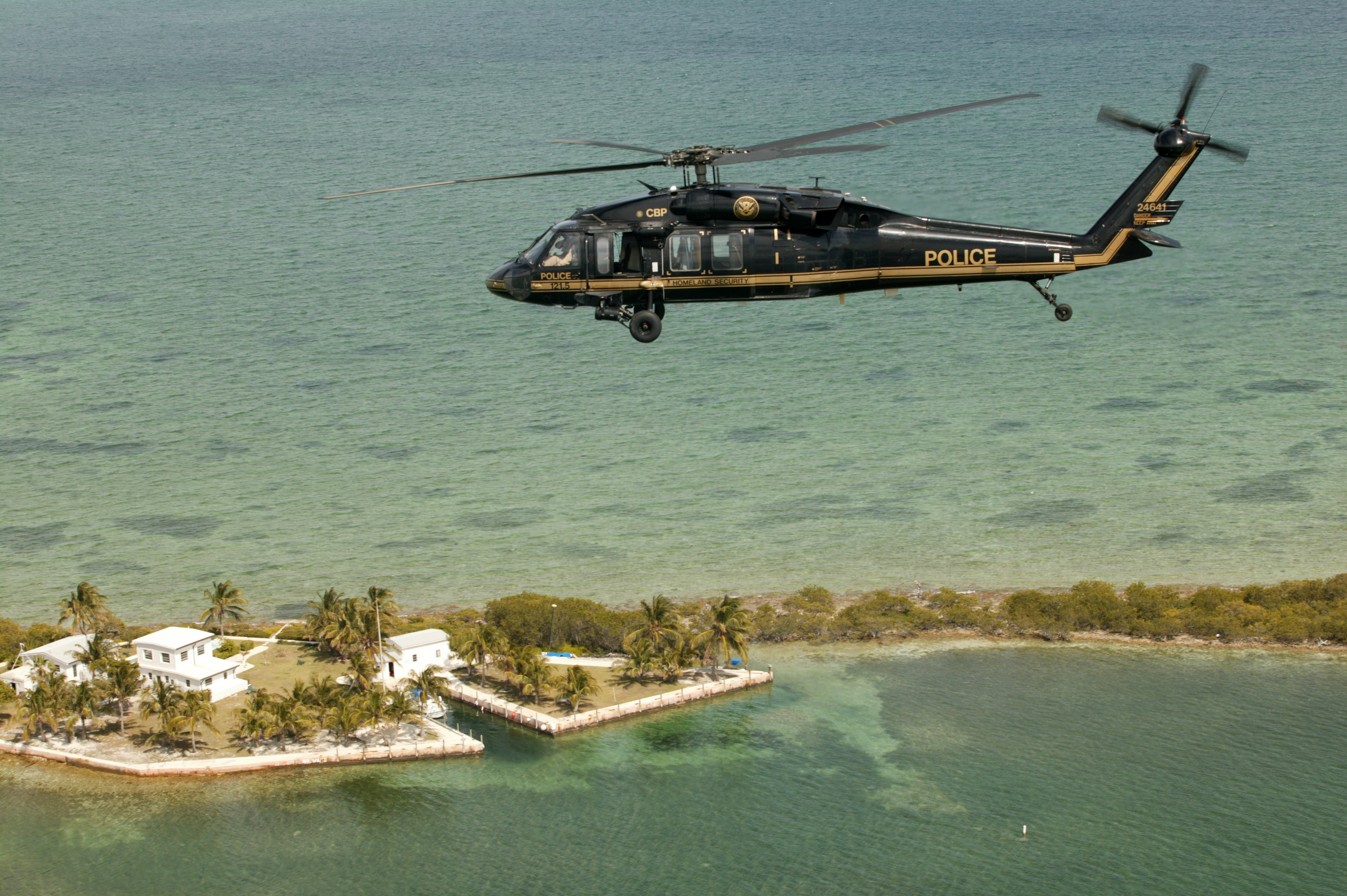
The American militia movement claim that a coup d'état will be launched by a "Secret Team" in black helicopters.

American right-wing populist conspiracy theorists, especially those who joined the militia movement in the United States, speculate that the New World Order will be implemented through a dramatic coup d'état by a "secret team", using black helicopters, in the U.S. and other nation-states to bring about a totalitarian world government controlled by the United Nations and enforced by troops of foreign U.N. peacekeepers. Following the Rex 84 and Operation Garden Plot plans, this military coup would involve the suspension of the Constitution, the imposition of martial law, and the appointment of military commanders to head state and local governments and to detain dissidents.

These conspiracy theorists, who are all strong believers in a right to keep and bear arms, are extremely fearful that the passing of any gun control legislation will be later followed by the abolition of personal gun ownership and a campaign of gun confiscation, and that the refugee camps of emergency management agencies such as FEMA will be used for the internment of suspected subversives, making little effort to distinguish true threats to the New World Order from pacifist dissidents.

Before 2000, some survivalists believed this process would be set in motion by the predicted Y2K problem causing societal collapse. Since many left-wing and right-wing conspiracy theorists believe that the 11 September attacks were a false flag operation carried out by the United States intelligence community, as part of a strategy of tension to justify political repression at home and preemptive war abroad, they have become convinced that a more catastrophic terrorist incident will be responsible for triggering Executive Directive 51 to complete the transition to a police state.

Skeptics argue that unfounded fears about an imminent or eventual gun ban, military coup, internment, or U.N. invasion and occupation are rooted in the siege mentality of the American militia movement but also an apocalyptic millenarianism which provides a basic narrative within the political right in the U.S., claiming that the idealized society (i.e., constitutional republic, Jeffersonian democracy, "Christian nation", "white nation") is thwarted by subversive conspiracies of liberal secular humanists who want "Big Government" and globalists who plot on behalf of the New World Order.

=== Mass surveillance ===
Conspiracy theorists concerned with surveillance abuse believe that the New World Order is being implemented by the cult of intelligence at the core of the surveillance-industrial complex through mass surveillance and the use of Social Security numbers, the bar-coding of retail goods with Universal Product Code markings, and, most recently, RFID tagging by microchip implants.

Claiming that corporations and government are planning to track every move of consumers and citizens with RFID as the latest step toward a 1984-like surveillance state, consumer privacy advocates, such as Katherine Albrecht and Liz McIntyre, have become Christian conspiracy theorists who believe spychips must be resisted, because they argue that modern database and communications technologies, coupled with point of sale data-capture equipment and sophisticated ID and authentication systems, now make it possible to require a biometrically associated number or mark to make purchases. They fear that the ability to implement such a system closely resembles the Number of the beast prophesied in the Book of Revelation.

In January 2002, the Information Awareness Office (IAO) was established by the Defense Advanced Research Projects Agency (DARPA) to bring together several DARPA projects focused on applying information technology to counter asymmetric threats to national security. Following public criticism that the development and deployment of these technologies could potentially lead to a mass surveillance system, the IAO was defunded by the United States Congress in 2003. The second source of controversy involved IAO's original logo, which depicted the "all-seeing" Eye of Providence atop of a pyramid looking down over the globe, accompanied by the Latin phrase scientia est potentia (knowledge is power). Although DARPA eventually removed the logo from its website, it left a lasting impression on privacy advocates. It also inflamed conspiracy theorists, who misinterpret the "eye and pyramid" as the Masonic symbol of the Illuminati, an 18th-century secret society they speculate continues to exist and is plotting on behalf of a New World Order.

American historian Richard Landes, who specialized in the history of apocalypticism and was co-founder and director of the Center for Millennial Studies at Boston University, argues that new and emerging technologies often trigger alarmism among millenarians. Even the introduction of Gutenberg's printing press in 1436 caused waves of apocalyptic thinking. The Year 2000 problem, bar codes, and Social Security numbers all triggered end-time warnings which either proved to be false or were no longer taken seriously once the public became accustomed to these technological changes. Civil libertarians argue that the privatization of surveillance and the rise of the surveillance-industrial complex in the United States does raise legitimate concerns about the erosion of privacy. However, skeptics of mass surveillance conspiracism caution that such concerns should be disentangled from secular paranoia about Big Brother or religious hysteria about the Antichrist.

=== Occultism ===
Conspiracy theorists of the Christian right, starting with British revisionist historian Nesta Helen Webster, believe there is an ancient occult conspiracy—started by the first mystagogues of Gnosticism and perpetuated by their alleged esoteric successors, such as the Kabbalists, Cathars, Knights Templar, Hermeticists, Rosicrucians, Freemasons, and, ultimately, the Illuminati—which seeks to subvert the Judeo-Christian foundations of the Western world and implement the New World Order through a one-world religion that prepares the masses to embrace the imperial cult of the Antichrist. More broadly, they speculate that globalists who plot on behalf of a New World Order are directed by occult agencies of some sort: unknown superiors, spiritual hierarchies, demons, fallen angels or Lucifer. They believe that these conspirators use the power of occult sciences (numerology), symbols (Eye of Providence), rituals (Masonic degrees), monuments (National Mall landmarks), buildings (Manitoba Legislative Building) and facilities (Denver International Airport) to advance their plot to rule the world.

For example, in June 1979, an unknown benefactor under the pseudonym "R. C. Christian" had a huge granite megalith built in the U.S. state of Georgia, which acts like a compass, calendar, and clock. A message comprising ten guides is inscribed on the occult structure in many languages to serve as instructions for survivors of a doomsday event to establish a more enlightened and sustainable civilization than the destroyed one. The "Georgia Guidestones" has subsequently become a spiritual and political Rorschach test onto which any number of ideas can be imposed. Some New Agers and neo-pagans revere it as a ley-line power nexus, while a few conspiracy theorists are convinced that they are engraved with the New World Order's anti-Christian "Ten Commandments." Should the Guidestones survive for centuries as their creators intended, many more meanings could arise, equally unrelated to the designer's original intention.

Skeptics argue that the demonization of Western esotericism by conspiracy theorists is rooted in religious intolerance but also in the same moral panics that have fueled witch trials in the Early Modern period, and satanic ritual abuse allegations in the United States.

=== Population control ===
Conspiracy theorists believe that the New World Order will also be implemented through human population control to more easily monitor and control the movement of individuals. The means range from stopping the growth of human societies through reproductive health and family planning programs, which promote abstinence, contraception and abortion, or intentionally reducing the bulk of the world population through genocides by mongering unnecessary wars, through plagues by engineering emergent viruses and tainting vaccines, and through environmental disasters by controlling the weather (HAARP, chemtrails), etc. Conspiracy theorists argue that globalists plotting on behalf of a New World Order are neo-Malthusians who engage in overpopulation and climate change alarmism to create public support for coercive population control and ultimately world government. United Nations Agenda 21 is condemned as "reconcentrating" people into urban areas and depopulating rural ones, even generating a dystopian novel by Glenn Beck where single-family homes are a distant memory. Conspiracy theorists in Australia linked smart city technologies to an agenda to create a one world government and install "big brother" technology to control the community.

Skeptics argue that fears of population control can be traced back to the traumatic legacy of the eugenics movement's "war against the weak" in the United States during the first decades of the 20th century but also the Second Red Scare in the U.S. during the late 1940s and 1950s, and to a lesser extent in the 1960s, when activists on the far right of American politics routinely opposed public health programs, notably water fluoridation, mass vaccination and mental health services, by asserting they were all part of a far-reaching plot to impose a socialist or communist regime. Their views were influenced by opposition to a number of major social and political changes that had happened in recent years: the growth of internationalism, particularly the United Nations and its programs; the introduction of social welfare provisions, particularly the various programs established by the New Deal; and government efforts to reduce inequalities in the social structure of the U.S. Opposition towards mass vaccinations in particular got significant attention in the late 2010s, so much so the World Health Organization listed vaccine hesitancy as one of the top ten global health threats of 2019. By this time, people that refused or refused to allow their children to be vaccinated were known colloquially as "anti-vaxxers", though citing the New World Order conspiracy theory or resistance to a perceived population control plan as a reason to refuse vaccination were few and far between.

=== Mind control ===
Social critics accuse governments, corporations, and the mass media of being involved in the manufacturing of a national consensus and, paradoxically, a culture of fear due to the potential for increased social control that a mistrustful and mutually fearing population might offer to those in power. The worst fear of some conspiracy theorists, however, is that the New World Order will be implemented through the use of mind control—a broad range of tactics able to subvert an individual's control of their own thinking, behavior, emotions, or decisions. These tactics are said to include everything from Manchurian candidate-style brainwashing of sleeper agents (Project MKULTRA, "Project Monarch") to engineering psychological operations (water fluoridation, subliminal advertising, "Silent Sound Spread Spectrum", MEDUSA) and parapsychological operations (Stargate Project) to influence the masses. The concept of wearing a tin foil hat for protection from such threats has become a popular stereotype and term of derision; the phrase serves as a byword for paranoia and is associated with conspiracy theorists.

Skeptics argue that the paranoia behind a conspiracy theorist's obsession with mind control, population control, occultism, surveillance abuse, Big Business, Big Government, and globalization arises from a combination of two factors, when he or she: 1) holds strong individualist values and 2) lacks power. The first attribute refers to people who care deeply about an individual's right to make their own choices and direct their own lives without interference or obligations to a larger system (like the government), but combine this with a sense of powerlessness in one's own life. One gets what some psychologists call "agency panic," intense anxiety about an apparent loss of autonomy to outside forces or regulators. When fervent individualists feel that they cannot exercise their independence, they experience a crisis and assume that larger forces are to blame for usurping this freedom.

== Alleged conspirators ==
According to Domhoff, many people seem to believe that the United States is ruled from behind the scenes by a conspiratorial elite with secret desires, i.e., by a small, secretive group that wants to change the government system or put the country under the control of a world government. In the past, the conspirators were usually said to be crypto-communists who were intent upon bringing the United States under a common world government with the Soviet Union, but the dissolution of the USSR in 1991 undercut that theory. Domhoff notes that most conspiracy theorists changed their focus to the United Nations as the likely controlling force in a New World Order, an idea which is undermined by the powerlessness of the U.N. and the unwillingness of even moderates within the American Establishment to give it anything but a limited role.

Although skeptical of New World Order conspiracism, political scientist David Rothkopf argues, in the 2008 book Superclass: The Global Power Elite and the World They Are Making, that the world population of 6 billion people is governed by an elite of 6,000 individuals. Until the late 20th century, governments of the great powers provided most of the superclass, accompanied by a few heads of international movements (i.e., the Pope of the Catholic Church) and entrepreneurs (Rothschilds, Rockefellers). According to Rothkopf, in the early 21st century, economic clout—fueled by the explosive expansion of international trade, travel, and communication—rules; the nation-state's power has diminished shrinking politicians to minority power broker status; leaders in international business, finance, and the defense industry not only dominate the superclass, but they also move freely into high positions in their nations' governments and back to private life largely beyond the notice of elected legislatures (including the U.S. Congress), which remain abysmally ignorant of affairs beyond their borders. He asserts that the superclass' disproportionate influence over national policy is constructive but always self-interested and that across the world, few object to corruption and oppressive governments provided they can do business in these countries.

Viewing the history of the world as the history of warfare between secret societies, conspiracy theorists go further than Rothkopf, and other scholars who have studied the global power elite, by claiming that established upper-class families with "old money" who founded and finance the Bilderberg Group, Bohemian Club, Club of Rome, Council on Foreign Relations, Rhodes Trust, Skull and Bones, Trilateral Commission, and similar think tanks and private clubs, are illuminated conspirators plotting to impose a totalitarian New World Order—the implementation of an authoritarian world government controlled by the United Nations and a global central bank, which maintains political power through the financialization of the economy, regulation and restriction of speech through the concentration of media ownership, mass surveillance, widespread use of state terrorism, and an all-encompassing propaganda that creates a cult of personality around a puppet world leader and ideologizes world government as the culmination of history's progress.

== Criticism ==
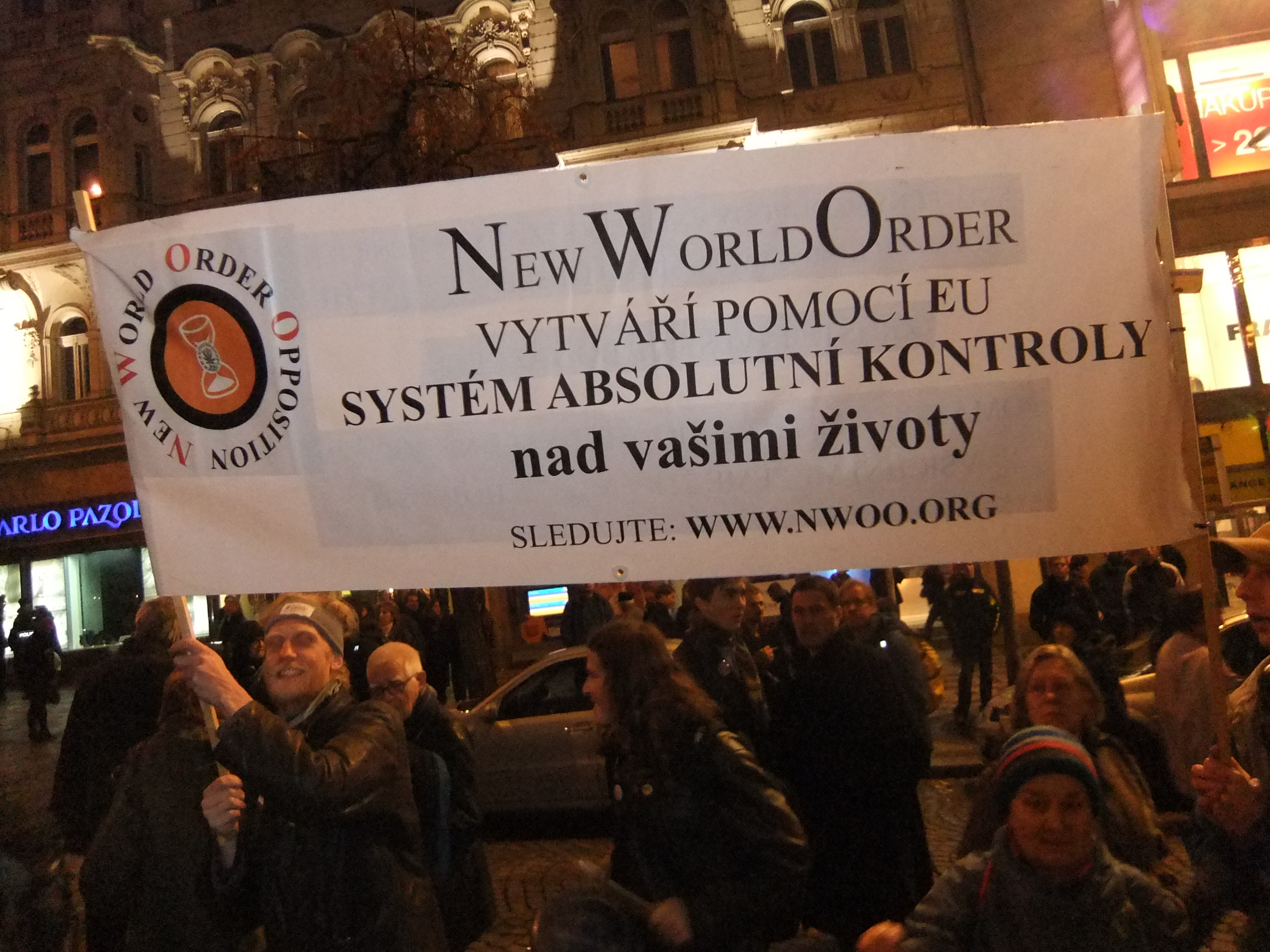
Anti-NWO demonstration in Prague, 2010

Skeptics of New World Order conspiracy theories accuse its proponents of indulging in the furtive fallacy, a belief that significant facts of history are necessarily sinister; conspiracism, a world view that centrally places conspiracy theories in the unfolding of history, rather than social and economic forces; and fusion paranoia, a promiscuous absorption of fears from any source whatsoever.

Marxists, who are skeptical of right-wing populist conspiracy theories, also accuse the global power elite of not having the best interests of all at heart, and many intergovernmental organizations of suffering from a democratic deficit, but they argue that the superclass are plutocrats only interested in brazenly imposing a neoliberal or neoconservative new world order—the implementation of global capitalism through economic and military coercion to protect the interests of transnational corporations—which systematically undermines the possibility of international socialism. Arguing that the world is in the middle of a transition from the American Empire to the rule of a global ruling class that has emerged from within the American Empire, they point out that right-wing populist conspiracy theorists, blinded by their anti-communism, fail to see that what they demonize as the "New World Order" is, ironically, the highest stage of the very capitalist economic system they defend.

Domhoff, a professor in psychology and sociology who studies theories of power, wrote in 2005 an essay entitled There Are No Conspiracies. He says that for this theory to be true, it required several "wealthy and highly educated people" to do things that don't "fit with what we know about power structures". Claims that this will happen go back decades and have always been proved wrong.

Partridge, a contributing editor to the global affairs magazine Diplomatic Courier, wrote a 2008 article entitled One World Government: Conspiracy Theory or Inevitable Future? He says that if anything, nationalism, which is the opposite of a global government, is rising. He also says that attempts at creating global governments or global agreements "have been categorical failures".

Although some cultural critics see superconspiracy theories about a New World Order as "postmodern metanarratives" that may be politically empowering, a way of giving ordinary people a narrative structure with which to question what they see around them, skeptics argue that conspiracism leads people into cynicism, convoluted thinking, and a tendency to feel it is hopeless even as they denounce the alleged conspirators.

Alexander Zaitchik from the Southern Poverty Law Center wrote a report titled "'Patriot' Paranoia: A Look at the Top Ten Conspiracy Theories", in which he personally condemns such conspiracies as an effort of the radical right to undermine society.

Concerned that the improvisational millennialism of most conspiracy theories about a New World Order might motivate lone wolves to engage in leaderless resistance leading to domestic terrorist incidents like the Oklahoma City bombing, Barkun writes that "the danger lies less in such beliefs themselves ... than in the behavior they might stimulate or justify" and warns "should they believe that the prophesied evil day had in fact arrived, their behavior would become far more difficult to predict."

Warning of the threat to American democracy posed by right-wing populist movements led by demagogues who mobilize support for mob rule or even a fascist revolution by exploiting the fear of conspiracies, Berlet writes that

Right-wing populist movements can cause serious damage to a society because they often popularize xenophobia, authoritarianism, scapegoating, and conspiracism. This can lure mainstream politicians to adopt these themes to attract voters, legitimize acts of discrimination (or even violence), and open the door for revolutionary right-wing populist movements, such as fascism, to recruit from the reformist populist movements.

Criticisms of New World Order conspiracy theorists also come from within their own community. Despite believing themselves to be "freedom fighters", many right-wing populist conspiracy theorists hold views that are incompatible with their professed libertarianism, such as Christian dominionism, authoritarian ultranationalism, white supremacy and eliminationism.

== See also ==
- Anti-globalization movement
- Brainwashing
- Climate change denial
- Criticisms of globalization
- Zionist Occupation Government conspiracy theory
