= Conspiracy Theory (film) =

1997 American political action film by Richard Donner

- Theatrical release poster
- Directed by: Richard Donner
- Written by: Brian Helgeland
- Produced by: Richard Donner; Joel Silver
- Starring: Mel Gibson; Julia Roberts; Patrick Stewart
- Cinematography: John Schwartzman
- Edited by: Kevin Stitt; Frank J. Urioste
- Music by: Carter Burwell
- Production companies: Silver Pictures; Shuler Donner/Donner Productions
- Distributed by: Warner Bros.
- Release date: August 8, 1997 (United States)
- Running time: 135 minutes
- Language: English
- Budget: $80 million
- Box office: $137 million

Conspiracy Theory is a 1997 American political action thriller film directed by Richard Donner. Starring Mel Gibson, Julia Roberts and Patrick Stewart, the original screenplay by Brian Helgeland centers on an eccentric taxi driver who believes many world events are triggered by government conspiracies, and the Justice Department attorney who becomes involved in his life. The film grossed $137 million, and critical reviews were mixed.

== Plot ==
New York City taxi driver Jerry Fletcher is a passionate conspiracy theorist, happily sharing his ideas with anyone who will listen. His favorite audience is Justice Department lawyer Alice Sutton, who tolerates him because he once saved her from a mugging but is unaware he spies on her at home. She is haunted by the murder of her father, a judge, which her superior, Mr. Wilson, believes was ordered by an inmate her father denied an appeal.

One day, Jerry notices several men he surmises to be CIA agents, who lure him into a trap. They bring him to a man who, claiming to know Jerry well, injects him with LSD and demands to understand who he has been talking to "about us." Experiencing terrifying hallucinations and flashbacks, Jerry manages to escape after biting the interrogator's nose, but is injured when the wheelchair he is taped to falls down a flight of stairs and a metal rod pierces his abdomen. Accosting Alice in the Justice Department lobby, a frantic, bloodied Jerry grabs a security guard's gun and is arrested.

Taken to the hospital, Jerry is handcuffed to a bed and drugged. Before losing consciousness, he begs Alice to switch his chart with the criminal in the next bed, claiming he will be dead by morning otherwise. When Alice returns the next day, the criminal has died from an alleged heart attack and the police, along with the FBI and the CIA, arrive to identify the body, believing it to be Jerry's. The CIA is led by a therapist named Dr. Jonas, whose nose is bandaged. Jerry fakes a heart attack and, with a reluctant Alice's help, escapes again. Alice and FBI Agent Lowry examine Jerry's belongings before the CIA confiscates them. She returns to her car to find Jerry hiding in the back seat. While driving, Jerry explains someone is likely following her. Alice waves the suspicious car on to discover it is Lowry; she convinces him to leave her alone until she has more information to offer.

At Jerry's apartment, he suspects that a subject in the conspiracy newsletter he produces has set off this sudden interest in him, but has no idea what it is. Alice, meanwhile, begins to grasp the depths of Jerry's paranoia and loneliness, including his compulsion to buy copies of Catcher in the Rye despite never reading it. Just as she's decided he is crazy, a SWAT team starts to break in. Jerry activates devices that incinerate the apartment and they leave through a hidden trapdoor. In the room below, Alice is startled by a mural of her riding a horse - something she gave up after her father's murder - and the triple smokestacks of the Ravenswood Generating Station. Jerry disguises himself as a firefighter and carries Alice past emergency services and an arriving Jonas. They go to her apartment, where Jerry inadvertently reveals he has been watching Alice and is kicked out. Down on the street, Jerry notices Lowry and his partner staking out the apartment and warns them off at gunpoint. After a compulsive purchase at a bookstore is flagged by the CIA, Jerry flees from agents into a theater and escapes by faking a bomb threat.

Alice is told by Mr. Wilson that the Justice Department must cooperate with Dr. Jonas to locate Jerry. Suspicious, she calls each person on Jerry's mailing list and finds that all but one, Harry Finch, have recently passed on. Jerry disables the CIA's van and uses a ruse to get Alice out of the office. While escaping through a subway station, he tells her that he fell in love with her at first sight, fleeing on a subway train when she brushes off his feelings.

Alice goes to see Harry Finch, who turns out to be Jonas. He explains that he helped develop the MKUltra program, unofficially continuing it after being shut down in 1973. His brainwashing techniques, which he used to turn people like Jerry into assassins, were stolen by a mysterious party, who he needs Jerry to identify. He also claims that Jerry killed Alice's father. She agrees to help find Jerry, who sends her a message to meet him. Ditching the agents by causing a traffic jam on the Queensboro Bridge and switching cars, he drives her to her father's private horse stables in Connecticut. Along the way, Alice secretly calls her office so Jonas and Wilson can track her phone. At the stables, Jerry remembers that he was programmed to kill her father but the sight of Alice dissuaded him. Instead, he became friends with the judge, remembering the inmate who was denied the appeal was actually innocent, and promised to watch over Alice after her father was mortally wounded by another assassin. Jonas' men arrive, capturing Jerry and killing Wilson, but Alice manages to escape.

Alice brings Lowry to the offices where she met Jonas, which they find cleared out. She forces Lowry at gunpoint to admit that he is not actually FBI, but from a "secret agency that watches the other agencies". They have been using the unwitting Jerry to flush out Jonas and find out who he has been building assassins for. Alice goes to Ravenswood and sees a mental hospital next door. She breaks in and finds Jerry just as groups led by Jonas and Lowry arrive, setting off a gun battle. Jerry attempts to drown Jonas, who pulls an ankle gun and shoots Jerry before being killed by Alice. She tells Jerry she loves him before he is taken away in an ambulance. Some time later, a grieving Alice visits Jerry's grave and leaves a pin that he had given her. She takes up horse riding again. Observing Alice from a car with Lowry, Jerry—whose death and burial had been faked by the secret agency—reaffirms his agreement not to contact her until the rest of Jonas's subjects are caught. As they drive away singing "Can't Take My Eyes Off You", Alice finds the pin attached to her saddle, and smiles.

Among the numerous conspiracy theories mentioned by Jerry include Rockefeller Center, fluoridation, the United Nations, the JFK assassination, Watergate funder Armand Hammer, the "New World Order", Freemasons, the CIA, the Vatican, microchipping of pets, Moon landings, Pearl Harbor, and silent "Black Helicopters".

== Cast ==
- Mel Gibson as Jerry Fletcher
- Julia Roberts as Alice Sutton
- Patrick Stewart as Dr. Jonas
- Cylk Cozart as Agent Lowry
- Steve Kahan as Wilson, boss of Alice
- Terry Alexander as Flip
- Pete Koch as Fire Captain
- Dean Winters as Cleet
- Alex McArthur as Cynic
- Kenneth Tigar as Lawyer
- Sean Patrick Thomas as Surveillance Operator
- Joan Lunden as TV Announcer

Director Richard Donner made a cameo as Jerry's cab passenger.

== Production ==
All scenes filmed at the horse farm used Lionshare Farm in Greenwich, Connecticut. That facility is owned by United States Equestrian Team member Peter Leone—who coached Julia Roberts through the scene at movie's end, where she gallops her horse across a field while Mel Gibson's character looks on longingly from a vehicle driving on a nearby road.

== Reception ==
=== Box office ===
Conspiracy Theory was released August 8, 1997, to 2,806 theaters, and had an opening Friday gross of $19.3 million in the United States. It opened at number 1 in the U.S., displacing Air Force One. It eventually grossed $76 million in the U.S. and $61 million internationally.

=== Critical response ===
Review aggregation website Rotten Tomatoes gives the film a score of 59% based on reviews from 44 critics. Metacritic, which uses a weighted average, assigned the film a score of 50 out of 100, based on 21 critics, indicating "mixed or average" reviews. Audiences polled by CinemaScore gave the film an average grade of "B+" on an A+ to F scale.

In her review in The New York Times, Janet Maslin said, "The only sneaky scheme at work here is the one that inflates a hollow plot to fill 2¼ hours while banishing skepticism with endless close-ups of big, beautiful movie-star eyes ... Gibson, delivering one of the hearty, dynamic star turns that have made him the Peter Pan of the blockbuster set, makes Jerry much more boyishly likable than he deserves to be. The man who talks to himself and mails long, delusional screeds to strangers is not usually the dreamboat type ... After the story enjoys creating real intrigue ... it becomes tied up in knots. As with too many high-concept escapades, Conspiracy Theory tacks on a final half-hour of hasty explanations and mock-sincere emotion. The last scene is an outright insult to anyone who took the movie seriously at its start."

Lisa Schwarzbaum of Entertainment Weekly graded the film B− and commented, "Richard Donner ... switches the movie from a really interesting, jittery, literate, and witty tone poem about justified contemporary paranoia (and the creatively unhinged dark side of New York City) to an overloaded, meandering iteration of a Lethal Weapon project that bears the not-so-secret stamp of audience testing and tinkering."

In the San Francisco Chronicle, Mick LaSalle stated, "If I were paranoid I might suspect a conspiracy at work in the promoting of this movie—to suck in audiences with a catchy hook and then give them something much more clumsy and pedestrian ... Conspiracy Theory can be enjoyed once one gives up hope of its becoming a thinking person's thriller and accepts it as just another diversion ... When all else fails, there are still the stars to look at—Roberts, who actually manages to do some fine acting, and Gibson, whose likability must be a sturdy thing indeed."

Roger Ebert of the Chicago Sun-Times observed the film "cries out to be a small film—a quixotic little indie production where the daffy dialogue and weird characters could weave their coils of paranoia into great offbeat humor. Unfortunately, the parts of the movie that are truly good are buried beneath the deadening layers of thriller cliches and an unconvincing love story ... If the movie had stayed at ground level—had been a real story about real people—it might have been a lot better, and funnier. All of the energy is in the basic material, and none of it is in a romance that is grafted on like an unneeded limb or superfluous organ."

In Rolling Stone, Peter Travers said, "The strong impact that Gibson makes as damaged goods is diluted by selling Jerry as cute and redeemable. Instead of a scalding brew of mirth and malice, served black, Donner settles up a tepid latte, decaf. What a shame—Conspiracy Theory could have been a contender."

Todd McCarthy of Variety called the film "a sporadically amusing but listless thriller that wears its humorous, romantic and political components like mismatched articles of clothing ... This is a film in which all things ... are treated lightly, even glibly ... One can readily sympathize with ... the director's desire to inject the picture with as much humor as possible. But he tries to have it every which way in the end, and the conflicting moods and intentions never mesh comfortably."

Pauline Kael in an interview said "the first half of Conspiracy Theory was terrific, then it went to hell" but that Mel Gibson was "stunningly good."

In his 2003 book A Culture of Conspiracy, political scientist Michael Barkun notes that a vast popular audience has been introduced by the film to the notion that the U.S. government is controlled by a deep state whose secret agents use black helicopters — a view once confined to the radical right.
