= Mark Koernke =

American activist

Mark Gregory Koernke (/ˈkɔːrŋki/; born 1957), known as "Mark from Michigan," is an American militia activist and shortwave radio broadcaster. As an early proponent of the black helicopters conspiracy theory, he was largely responsible for popularizing it in appearances on Tom Valentine's radio show and in speeches which were widely circulated on videocassette. He was host of his own radio show, "The Intelligence Report", on WWCR until the station indefinitely suspended his broadcasts. Shortly before his suspension, Koernke had suggested that authorities were setting up Timothy J. McVeigh for assassination. During this time he was interviewed by Sam Donaldson.

Koernke is also known for his various educational videos on the New World Order. One of his better known pieces of work is called "America in Peril". America in Peril is the first in a trilogy of movies with America in Peril 2, and America in Peril 3 being the following documentaries.

After serving a three-to-seven-year sentence in prison for assaulting police, resisting arrest, and fleeing from police in a car chase, Koernke claimed that he had been set up by John Stadtmiller, co-founder of the Republic radio network syndicating his show.

On March 15, 2007, Koernke completed his sentence and was released from prison. He is not under any parole since he served his entire time sentenced in prison. Koernke initially resumed hosting "The Intelligence Report" on the "Patriot Broadcasting Network" and WTPRN but now is broadcasting on Liberty Tree Radio and the Micro Effect. In addition to radio Mark Koernke has many training videos on his YouTube page under the name Libertytreeradio.

== See also ==
- American militia movement
