= The war to end war =

Term used to refer to World War I

Title page of The War That Will End War by H. G. Wells

"The war to end war" (now commonly phrased "the war to end all wars"; originally from the 1914 book The War That Will End War by H. G. Wells) is a term for the First World War (1914–1918). Originally an idealistic slogan, it is now mainly used sardonically, since not only was the First World War not history's final war, but its aftermath also indirectly contributed to the outbreak of the even more devastating Second World War (1939–1945).

== Origin ==
During August 1914, immediately after the outbreak of the war, English author and social commentator H. G. Wells published a number of articles in London newspapers that subsequently appeared as a book entitled The War That Will End War. He blamed the Central Powers for starting the war and argued that only the defeat of German militarism could bring about an end. He used the shorter form, "the war to end war", for In the Fourth Year (1918), in which he noted that the phrase "got into circulation" in the second half of 1914. It became one of the most common catchphrases of the First World War.

== Later use ==
During the First World War, the phrase met with some degree of skepticism. As it became apparent that the war had not succeeded in ending war, the phrase took on a more cynical tone. The British staff officer Archibald Wavell, a future field marshal and viceroy of India, said despondently of the Paris Peace Conference: "After the 'war to end war', they seem to have been pretty successful in Paris at making the 'Peace to end Peace'." Wells himself used the phrase in an ironic way in the novel The Bulpington of Blup (1932). Walter Lippmann in 1967 noted: "The delusion is that whatever war we are fighting is the war to end war", while U.S. President Richard Nixon in his "Silent Majority" speech (1969) said: "I do not tell you that the war in Vietnam is the war to end wars".

Since at least the last third of the 20th century, the alternative wording "the war to end all wars" has increasingly become popular. "The War to End All Wars" has been used by authors such as Edward M. Coffman (1968), Russell Freedman (2010) and Adam Hochschild (2011).

== See also ==
- Mutual assured destruction
- Peace for our time
- Never again
- Mission Accomplished speech
