= The New World Order (Wells book) =

1940 non-fiction book by H. G. Wells

- First edition
- Author: H. G. Wells
- Original title: The New World Order: Whether It Is Attainable, How It Can Be Attained, and What Sort of World a World at Peace Will Have to Be
- Cover artist: William Kermode
- Language: English
- Subject: Peace; Social issues; International affairs
- Publisher: Secker & Warburg
- Publication date: 1940
- Publication place: United Kingdom
- Media type: Print (hardback and paperback)
- Pages: 191 (first edition, hardback)
- OCLC: 797112599
- Text: The New World Order at Project Gutenberg Australia

The New World Order is a non-fiction book written by H. G. Wells and published by Secker & Warburg in January 1940. In The New World Order, Wells proposes a framework of international functionalism that could guide the world towards world peace. To achieve that end, Wells asserts that a socialist and scientifically planned world government would be needed to defend human rights.

Wells was motivated to write The New World Order by the outbreak of World War II. He was concerned that the Allies had no clear statement of aims for fighting the war and that this would lead to the continuation of the pre-existing balance of power. In the book, Wells argues that without a revolution in international affairs and the establishment of human rights, further destructive wars would be inevitable.

The New World Order received praise for its imagination but was also criticised for its lack of technical detail and emphasis on collectivism.

The book includes Wells's proposal for a human rights declaration, a precursor to his work on the Sankey Declaration of the Rights of Man (1940). Although widely publicised by its sponsors at the time, these proposals were overtaken by the 1947 Universal Declaration of Human Rights (1948).

== Background ==
The science fiction works of H. G. Wells reached a broad popular audience and covered the big ideas that were emerging at the start of the 20th century. His utopian exploration of concepts like technological change, evolution, identity and new forms of global governance has seen scholars describe him as "the father of science fiction". The British author George Orwell, a harsh critic of Wells, said that no one writing books between 1900 and 1920 influenced the young as much as H. G. Wells. Orwell also expressed that "thinking people who were born about the beginning of this century are in some sense Wells's own creation".

Wells's non-fiction works (Note: Even though Wells was well-known for his science fiction works, he published more non-fiction than fiction after 1915. One account of Wells makes the point that the highest point of his literary output "coincided with his temporary withdrawal from political advocacy and campaigning, as if Wells were trying a different form of advocacy for his ideas" (Gentry & Mason 2019, p. 624).) mainly analysed the issues of his time and in these works he consistently urged that a socialistic and cosmopolitan world government would solve modern social issues. Wells believed that technological innovations were making the world a smaller place, and this presented an opportunity to unify the world. The scholar John Partington has argued that Wells "promoted, years ahead of his time, many of the internationalist policies and realities of the post-1945 period". Partington also argues that Wells is the first to form a theoretical account of international functionalism. Whilst Wells became more insistent with his support of international functionalism throughout his career, the publication of The New World Order was the first time he began to condemn other models of transnational government.

Wells's contemporaries mostly disregarded his insistence for forming a world state, with his proposal being considered as too unrealistic to be politically possible. His utopian fiction was also the subject of parody in Aldous Huxley's Brave New World and George Orwell's Coming Up for Air.

In the inter-war period, Wells was one of the first members of two civil society organisations – PEN and the National Council for Civil Liberties (NCCL). Both organisations primarily advocated for the human right to free speech and expression. However, with the rise of the Nazi Party in Germany and fascism in Spain, both organisations became increasingly political in promoting humanist and pacifist causes. In The New World Order, Wells urged his readers to join the NCCL, pressing that it "is your duty as a world citizen".

In October 1939, one month after Britain declared war on Nazi Germany, Wells initiated a public campaign to make human rights a point of international concern. Wells wrote a letter to The Times calling for a "Great Debate" into establishing the aims for fighting in World War II, (Note: This was the second time in Wells's life in which he asked for a clear set of post-war aims. During World War I, Wells wrote about the need to establish viable post-war aims that prevent the potential of future violent conflict. In 1918, Wells wrote In the Fourth Year that he supported the establishment of a "League of Free Nations" which would maintain peace through centralising world power and diplomacy. Wells would go on to be disappointed with the establishment of the League of Nations in 1920 as he felt its hierarchy maintained conventional diplomacy and the pre-existing balance of power (Gentry & Mason 2019, pp. 627–629).) arguing that the formulation and acceptance of human rights should be at the forefront of these aims. The Times declined his proposal for a national debate into the subject, (Note: A debate into war aims was happening at a national level in the short time prior to Neville Chamberlain declaring war on Nazi Germany. Around one thousand books were published in Britain on the subject of war aims over the course of World War II, despite a shortage in paper across the country. Most of these publications were concerned with defeating Nazi Germany and recognising the inadequacy of the pre-war system of international relations. Because of these debates, the British government appointed a select committee to define its war aims (Gentry & Mason 2019, pp. 637–638).) but the Daily Herald gave Wells one page a day for a month to host the discussion. Wells's work in the Daily Herald served as the foundations for his human rights declaration in The New World Order.

== Publication ==
The New World Order was published in January 1940 by Secker & Warburg in London and by Alfred A. Knopf in New York. Beginning in November 1939, before the official publication of The New World Order, The Fortnightly Review magazine began serialising the book in four monthly instalments, ending February 1940. The New World Order would go on to be re-issued in 1942 by being bounded with another book by Wells, The Fate of Homo Sapiens. The re-issued twofer received a new title, The Outlook for Homo Sapiens.

== Synopsis ==
H. G. Wells starts The New World Order by setting out the aim to provide a "nucleus of useful information for those who have to go on with this business of making a world peace". After introducing the objective of the book, Wells admits that people of his generation "thought that war was dying out". For Wells, "disruptive forces" were building up in civilised society, but in the years before World War I, these forces were operating at the margins of civilisation. These forces included an arms race, economic stress, social upheaval and the continuation of the pre-existing balance of power. Wells argues that these forces caused World War I and World War II and are the symptoms of intertwining patriotism and enterprise with the world system. Wells declares that a revolution must occur to replace the world system, as otherwise, humanity faces extinction.

Wells goes on to insist that "free speech and vigorous publication" are at the forefront of working towards world peace. He points out that the conditions of war lead to the suppression of free speech, which would harm his wish of a "great world debate". For Wells, a free and open discussion about reconstructing the post-war order was "something much more important than warfare". Next, Wells identifies that technological innovations had caused the "abolition of distance" and a change in the scale of production in modern society. Wells expresses that an out-dated mode of thinking has met both of these new facts of global life, leading to unnecessary destruction in economic, social and biological life. Wells goes on to argue that the era of nationhood was obsolete, and only a "rational consolidation of human affairs" would ensure human survival. Before progressing his argument further, Wells distinguishes his vision of global collectivisation from Marxism and Soviet communism. He firstly defined collectivisation as such:

Collectivisation means the handling of the common affairs of mankind by a common control responsible to the whole community. It means the suppression of go-as-you-please in social and economic affairs just as much as in international affairs. It means the frank abolition of profit-seeking and of every device by which human beings contrive to be parasitic on their fellow man. It is the practical realisation of the brotherhood of man through a common control.

— H. G. Wells, The New World Order

In the case of the Soviet political system, Wells argued that its form of socialism lacked respect for individual freedom. Wells asserted that the Soviets forgot that "the more highly things are collectivised, the more necessary is a legal system embodying the Rights of Man". Wells also goes on to state that Marx's concept of class conflict is "an entanglement and perversion of the world drive towards a world collectivism". Later in The New World Order, Wells assails the Vatican for being against socialism and free speech. He also criticises Clarence K. Streit's version of world federation, arguing that it "seems hopelessly vague", "confused" and "hopelessly optimistic". Wells then goes on to advance that the outbreak of war was bringing about socialism across the world. For Wells, the historical process was bringing about changes in society without revolutionary intervention. Wells provides Great Britain as an example, saying that it has "in effect gone socialist in a couple of months". From here, Wells begins to formalise how to achieve the collectivisation of world affairs:

The new and complete Revolution can be defined in a very few words. It is (a) outright world-socialism, scientifically planned and directed, plus (b) a sustained insistence upon law, law based on a fuller, more jealously conceived resentment of the personal Rights of Man, plus (c) the completest freedom of speech, criticism and publication, and sedulous expansion of the educational organisation to the ever-growing demands of the new order.

— H. G. Wells, The New World Order

To protect an individual's liberty under global socialism, Wells asserts that a set of human rights must become universal law and be the primary motive of peace negotiations at the conclusion of the war. Wells drafts his version of a Declaration of the Rights of Man with the following ten human rights:

1. The right to nourishment.
2. The right to education.
3. The right to be paid in an occupation of choice.
4. The right to exchange.
5. The right to legal protection.
6. The right to free movement.
7. The right to not be imprisoned unjustly.
8. The right to be free from any misrepresentation that may cause distress or injury.
9. The right to not be tortured.
10. The right to be subject to the universal laws of human rights.

Wells concludes The New World Order by saying that the remaking of world order will come into being similar to the process of science and invention:

There will be no day of days then when a new world order comes into being. Step by step and here and there it will arrive, and even as it comes into being it will develop fresh perspectives, discover unsuspected problems and go on to new adventures. No man, no group of men, will ever be singled out as its father or founder. For its maker will be not this man nor that man nor any man but Man, that being who is in some measure in every one of us. World order will be, like science, like most inventions, a social product, an innumerable number of personalities will have lived fine lives, pouring their best into the collective achievement.

— H. G. Wells, The New World Order

== Critical reception ==
For the American poet T. S. Eliot, The New World Order was indicative of a resurgence in H. G. Wells's career in public discourse. Eliot responded to the conclusion of The Fortnightly Review's serialisation of The New World Order by writing an article for the New English Weekly. In this article, Eliot compared Wells to Winston Churchill, noting that both men shared a returning "glare of prominence" once found earlier in their respective careers. Despite this tribute from Eliot, he would end his remarks on The New World Order by highlighting that Wells "is walking very near the edge of despair" by wanting rapid change.

The English priest William Inge, who was a close rival of Wells, (Note: William Inge published an essay in The Fortnightly Review entitled The End of an Age, during The New World Order'ss serialisation. The End of an Age knocked The New World Order off the front pages of The Fortnightly Review (Ellis 2014, p. 140).) wrote a review of The New World Order in the scientific journal Nature. (Note: Following the publication of Inge's review, H. G. Wells wrote a letter to Nature to dispute Inge's review and statements surrounding the Spanish Civil War. Wells thought that a reputable journal like Nature should require its contributors to cite credible documentation for any controversial claims. Inge responded to Wells via a letter providing his sources. Nature subsequently published Wells's correspondence with Inge two weeks after Inge reviewed The New World Order (Wells 1940, p. 152).) For Inge, Wells's utopian vision in The New World Order was "utterly unrealisable", but he admired Wells's "earnest longing for a better world". Inge agreed with Wells that "frenzied nationalism" was a great danger to Europe and that the war engulfing Europe was a "ruinous folly". However, notwithstanding these agreements about World War II, Inge would go on to criticise The New World Order for espousing a "Fabian collectivism" that would extinguish the "strongest passions and instincts of human nature". Further, Inge thought that Wells was too sympathetic towards socialist causes, remarking that Wells "sees Red" when concerning his thoughts with society's elite. Also, despite Inge being an Anglican priest, he defended the Roman Catholic Church against Wells's criticisms that the Church was anti-revolutionary.

The American political scientist Charles E. Merriam reviewed The New World Order, stating that the book was "well worth examination". Merriam noted Wells's "good intentions" for drafting a set of human rights in the book, but did "deplore his somewhat feeble execution". In his review, Merriam insisted that political experts should cultivate a more "bold and venturesome Wellsian spirit" to solve "the great problem of modernising the large sections of our social institutions now demanding intelligent reconsideration and re-adjustment".

The Times Literary Supplement (TLS) remarked that if The New World Order aimed to provide solutions to contemporary problems, then the book "may seem jejune". The TLS praised Wells for his analysis of world issues but thought that his recommendations to solve these problems were "so general and vague that they are of little practical use". Further, the TLS expressed that whilst the book intended to provide solutions to world problems, what Wells unintentionally provided was "an attitude of mind which must be adopted if the search for a remedy is to succeed". For the TLS, The New World Order outlined "simply another utopia" that "keeps alive the vision and the dream" of achieving world peace through "the destruction of the sword".

One of the harshest critics of H. G. Wells's world state idea was the British author George Orwell. Whilst both writers considered socialist alternatives to their shared political climate, Orwell complained that Wells had no interest in the realities of politics. Orwell derides Wells's idealism in his essay Wells, Hitler and the World State, saying that, "what is the use in pointing out that a world state is desirable? What matters is that not one of the five great military powers would think of submitting to such a thing". Another point of contention for Orwell was the role of science in Wells's world state. Orwell argued that Wells confused scientific advancement with progress in societal values. For Orwell, this flaw in thinking made it hard for Wells to reconcile the order, planning and scientific encouragement found within Nazi Germany and his vision of a world state run by a scientific elite.

Dr Or Rosenboim, an academic at the School of Arts and Social Sciences of City, University of London, provided a contemporary evaluation of Wells's conception of world order. In her book The Emergence of Globalism: Visions of World Order in Britain and the United States, 1939–1950, Rosenboim highlighted that Wells's new world order was "limited by a conservative conception of statehood" and was "grounded in a monistic conception of order". Rosenboim further argued that "under the auspices of the universality of science, the world state extended on a global scale the specific historical experience of Western civilisation, leaving no space for diversity, pluralism, or dissent".

== Impact on the Universal Declaration of Human Rights (1948) ==
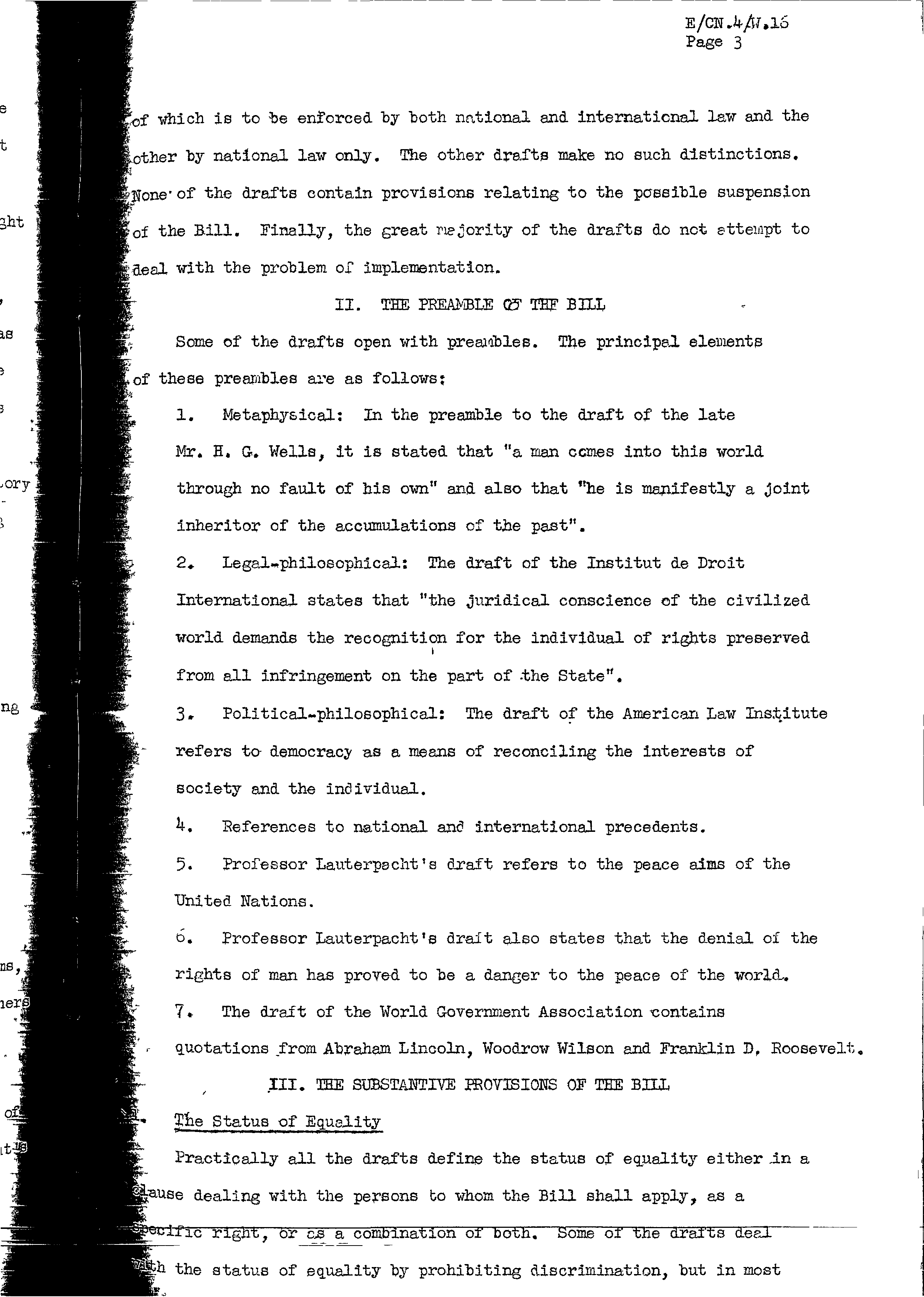
Page 3 of the document "Analysis of Various Draft International Bills of Rights", which was conducted in 1947 by the United Nations Commission on Human Rights. The document states that Wells's preamble to his declaration could serve as "metaphysical" inspiration for the preamble of the UDHR.

The New World Order was one of 18 advisory texts used to prepare the first draft of the Universal Declaration of Human Rights (UDHR). The United Nations Commission on Human Rights (UNCHR) (Note: The United Nations Commission on Human Rights (UNCHR) was a part of a collaborative process in drafting the UDHR. Being the first director of the UNCHR, John Peters Humphrey was given the task by the UN Secretary-General to be the principal author of the UDHR. Under Humphrey's guidance, the declaration underwent multiple revisions by different individuals and groups to weed out any individual influence or bias (Gentry & Mason 2019, pp. 621–623; Hensel 2003, pp. 93–96).) noted that the preamble to Wells's declaration in The New World Order was a point of "metaphysical" interest for drafting the preamble of the UDHR. Specifically, the UNCHR highlighted the phrases "a man comes into this world through no fault of his own" and that "he is manifestly a joint inheritor of the accumulations of the past".

Scholars have suggested that the totality of Wells's campaign to author and proliferate works on human rights, (Note: Wells made a concerted effort to share his human rights declaration amongst world leaders like Franklin D. Roosevelt, Mahatma Gandhi, Jan Masaryk, Chaim Weizmann, Edvard Benes, Jan Christian Smuts, and Jawaharlal Nehru. During World War II, his human rights works were published as cheap paperbacks by Penguin Books and translated into multiple languages. Wells's declaration achieved syndication in newspapers around the world, received a lengthy personal attack by the Nazi minister of propaganda Joseph Goebbels, and reputedly had thousands of people respond to the call for comment on the declaration. Additionally, his campaign throughout his career for robust global institutions, and his fictional works associated with promoting this idea, also contributed towards the proliferation of the human rights idea (Bell 2018, p. 867; Gentry & Mason 2019, pp. 639–640; Hensel 2003, p. 97).) like The New World Order, needs to be considered when measuring his impact on the UDHR. Australian human rights lawyer Geoffrey Robertson suggested in his book Crimes Against Humanity: The Struggle for Global Justice that Wells was the principal reviver of human rights promotion in the twentieth century. The socialist academic Peter Richie-Calder, who worked with Wells on the Sankey Committee, also commented that the UDHR had "contained the substance and meaning of the Wells debate".
