= In the Fourth Year =

1918 book of essays by H. G. Wells

- First edition (UK)
- Author: H. G. Wells
- Original title: In the Fourth Year: Anticipations of a World Peace
- Language: English
- Publisher: Chatto & Windus (UK); Macmillan (US)
- Publication date: May 1918
- Publication place: United Kingdom
- Media type: Print (hardback)
- Pages: 156

In the Fourth Year is a collection H. G. Wells assembled in the spring of 1918 from essays he had recently published discussing the problem of establishing lasting peace when World War I ended. It is mostly devoted to plans for the League of Nations and the discussion of post-war politics.

== Synopsis ==
Wells states in his May 1918 preface that the notion of a War to End War had seemed Utopian when he advanced it in 1914, but that in 1918 it had achieved "an air not only of being so practical, but of being so urgent and necessary and so manifestly the sane thing before mankind that not to be busied upon it, not to be making it more widely known and better understood, not to be working out its problems and bringing it about, is to be living outside of the contemporary life of the world."

The Fourth Year contains eleven chapters on the League of Nations, Allied war aims, and political institutions.

=== League of Nations ===
Wells believed that two considerations necessitated the instauration of a "League of Free Nations": "the present geographical impossibility of nearly all the existing European states and empires" and "the steadily increasing disproportion between the tortures and destructions inflicted by modern warfare and any possible advantages that may arise from it."

Wells regarded American history as a useful guide for those shaping the League of Nations: "We must begin by delegating [powers], as the States began by delegating." From the outset, he rejected the notion of equal representation of states: "The preservation of the world-peace rests with the great powers and with the great powers alone." He argued that "the delegates the Allied Powers send to the Peace Conference... should be elected ad hoc upon democratic lines," and proposed that they should be chosen by a body elected for this purpose.

Wells proposed that the League of Nations should have the power (1) "to adjudicate upon all international disputes whatever"; (2) "to define and limit the military and naval and aerial equipment of every country in the world"; to create "an authority that may legitimately call existing empires to give an account of their stewardship," and thus to "supersede Empire"; to exercise "international control of tropical Africa"; to establish "local self-development" in the Middle East "under honestly conceived international control of police and transit and trade"; and to establish "an international control of inter-State shipping and transport rates."

In the final essay in the volume, Wells called on intellectuals and teachers to engage in "the greatest of all propagandas" to make possible "this new world of democracy and the League of Free Nations to which all reasonable men are looking."

=== War Aims ===
For Wells, the "essential aim of the war" was "to defeat and destroy military imperialism," and to that end "to change Germany... to bring about a Revolution in Germany. We want Germany to become a democratically controlled State."

=== Political Institutions ===
Wells regarded the end of the "Teutonic dynastic system in Europe" as an inevitable consequence of Allied victory in World War I. To survive, the British monarchy "must speedily undergo the profoundest modification," perhaps by "the Anglicization of the royal family by national marriage."

Analyzing the concept of democracy, Wells noted that in contemporary conditions it is an impossibility, at least as the term was understood by the ancient Greeks who coined it. In current conditions, the term is confusingly embraced both by those who "believe that the common man can govern," and by those who "believe he can't." Wells distinguished delegate democracy (which governs through a majority vote by delegates) from selective democracy (which governs by "persons elected by the common man because he believes them to be persons able to govern") and favoured the latter; "I believe that 'delegate democracy' is already provably a failure in the world." Wells endorsed "Proportional Representation" (now known as the single transferable vote) as a way to overcome party politics in the selection of worthy individuals.

== Reception ==
In the Fourth Year, it was widely read. The essays it contains led Walter Lippmann (who had edited the pieces for publication in The New Republic) to seek out Wells when he visited England in August 1918, and their meetings influenced the US State Dept document interpreting President Wilson's Fourteen Points address. The end of the war came too quickly, however, for Wells's notion of a democratically elected Peace Conference to have any chance of realisation.

A shortened version of the book was published by the League of Free Nations Association.
