= The Open Conspiracy =

1928 book by Herbert George Wells

- First edition
- Author: H. G. Wells
- Original title: The Open Conspiracy: Blue Prints for a World Revolution
- Language: English
- Genre: Manifesto, Credo
- Publisher: Gollancz
- Publication date: 1928
- Publication place: United Kingdom
- Media type: Print (hardback)
- Pages: 200

The Open Conspiracy: Blue Prints for a World Revolution was published in 1928 by H. G. Wells, when he was 62 years old. It was revised and expanded in 1930 with the additional subtitle A Second Version of This Faith of a Modern Man Made More Explicit and Plain. In 1931 a further revised edition appeared titled What Are We to Do with Our Lives?. A final version appeared in 1933 under its original title. Many of its ideas are anticipated in Wells's 1926 novel The World of William Clissold.

The book is, in Wells's words, a "scheme to thrust forward and establish a human control over the destinies of life and liberate it from its present dangers, uncertainties and miseries." It proposes that largely as the result of scientific progress, a common vision of a world "politically, socially and economically unified" is emerging among educated and influential people, and that this can be the basis of "a world revolution aiming at universal peace, welfare and happy activity" that can result in the establishment of a "world commonwealth". This is to be achieved by "drawing together a proportion of all or nearly all the functional classes in contemporary communities in order to weave the beginnings of a world community out of their selection." This will ultimately "be a world religion."

== Summary ==
In the original edition, Wells begins by discussing religion, arguing that its essence is the subordination of self. "Modern religion," according to Wells, is the application of this human characteristic to the realisation of "better order in human affairs." What is contemplated is not a stable order, but rather a dynamic, changing state of affairs in which scientific research and creative activity become the chief preoccupations of a humanity that has solved the problems of subsistence, population control, and the suppression of war.

Wells analyses anticipated sources of resistance to his Open Conspiracy in three lengthy chapters, and takes a hostile stance against the "false loyalties, false standards of honour, false religious associations" that are "vestiges of the ancient order" with which there can be no compromise.

The Open Conspiracy's initial tasks are to be (1) explanation and propaganda, and (2) the organisation of open and explicit "refusal to serve in any war." Beyond that, he advocates the formation of thousands of ad hoc groups of all kinds, and anticipates that adherents of the movement will gradually separate themselves from existing society by forming their own schools and social life.

Wells proposes the following "broad essential requirements" for "independent initiatives in the Open Conspiracy": "(1) The complete assertion [...] of the provision nature of existing governments [...]; (2) The resolve to minimise [...] the conflicts of these governments; (3) The determination to replace private local or national ownership of at least credit, transport and staple production by a responsible world directorate [...]; (4) The practical recognition of the necessity for world biological controls, for example, of population and disease; (5) The support of a minimum standard of individual freedom and welfare in the world; and (6) The supreme duty of subordinating the personal life to the creation of a world directorate capable of these tasks and to the general advancement of human knowledge, capacity and power."

While hoping that the progress of the movement can be pacifistic, Wells expresses a willingness to accept hardship and martyrdom if need be: "The vision of a world at peace and liberated for an unending growth of knowledge and power is worth every danger of the way."

== Reception ==
The Open Conspiracy sold well and was well received by friends like Bertrand Russell, who said he read it "with the most complete sympathy." Some Open Conspiracy organisations were formed in a number of countries and a common newsletter was published. Wells discussed the ideas at luncheons with some leading British politicians, including Lloyd George, Harold Macmillan, and Harold Nicolson. The H. G. Wells Society set up by Gerald Heard in 1934 to promote Wells' ideas at one point changed its name to "The Open Conspiracy".

Both the book's form and content were criticised by George Bernard Shaw, who thought that Wells dismissed Karl Marx too readily and wrote in the style of an editorialist. G. K. Chesterton was also critical. Wells' biographer Michael Sherborne notes that while Wells' critics have described The Open Conspiracy as anti-democratic and elitist, his supporters have argued the book is "a boost for a civil society realized today by bodies such as Greenpeace and Amnesty International."

== See also ==
- Progressive League, a humanist campaigning organisation inspired by The Open Conspiracy
