= A Culture of Conspiracy =

2003 non-fiction book by Michael Barkun

- Cover, featuring the "Eye of Providence" on the reverse side of the Great Seal of the United States, which appears on the United States one-dollar bill.
- Author: Michael Barkun
- Published: 2003 (University of California Press; 1st edition)
- Publication place: United States
- Pages: 255
- ISBN: 0-520-23805-2
- OCLC: 51305869
- Preceded by: Religion and the Racist Right
- Followed by: Chasing Phantoms

A Culture of Conspiracy: Apocalyptic Visions in Contemporary America is a 2003 non-fiction book written by Michael Barkun, then a political scientist at Syracuse University. It was published by University of California Press.

== Background ==
The author, Michael Barkun, is a political scientist, then working for Syracuse University. His previous book, Religion and the Racist Right: The Origins of the Christian Identity Movement, focused on extreme religion. The book was published in 2003 by University of California Press.

== Summary ==
Along with the Internet playing a key role in introducing individuals to beliefs once consigned to the outermost fringe of American political and religious life, Barkun points to the convergence of two phenomena that influence contemporary American conspiracism:

- The rise of "improvisational millennialism" — a belief in an imminent destruction of the world and the creation of a new world as a result of the triumph of good over evil, which is independent from any single religious or secular tradition (e.g., Christian dispensational premillennialism, etc.) and indiscriminately syncretizes ideas from different traditions (e.g., Western esotericism, Eastern religions, New Age movement, fringe science, radical politics, etc.).
- The popularity of "stigmatized knowledge" — claims to the truth that the claimants regard as verified (e.g., climate change denial, location hypotheses of Atlantis, astrology, alchemy, folk medicine, alien abduction, extraterrestrial hypothesis for UFOs, suppressed cancer cures, etc.), despite the marginalization of those claims by the authoritative institutions that conventionally distinguish between knowledge and error (e.g., academia, scientific community, etc.).

Barkun dives into the different characteristics of conspiracy theories. According to him, there are certain attributes that occur in every account of conspiracy. First, conspiracy negates the possibility that something could happen by chance. Nothing in a conspiracist worldview is ever due to chance. Conspiracy theories are created at the root of the statement that nothing happens by accident.

Barkun states that in this view the universe is governed by design rather than randomness, which means that there is no room for accidents, everything is intentional. Secondly, when it comes to conspiracy, nothing is as it seems. Conspiracists have to disguise their true intentions and identities through deception. Therefore, according to conspiracy theorists, the appearance of innocence means nothing. Lastly, in conspiracy, everything is connected. Working hand in hand with the claim that nothing is left up to chance, the claim that everything is connected means that patterns are created everywhere in response. Constant linkage and connection must be created to explain what may seem like accidental.

== Reviews ==
Publishers Weekly gave the book a positive review, calling it "scholarly but fluently written and free of excessive jargon", and wrote that it "combines sociological depth with a deadpan appreciation of pop culture and raises serious questions about the replacement of democracy by conspiracy as the dominant paradigm of political action in the public mind." Paul Boyer described it as "in the tradition of studies of the cultural underground", and that Barkun "demonstrating the patience of Job, [...] only occasionally ventures a mild judgment". He concluded that "Barkun’s explorations, like the canary in the coal mine, warn us of what may lie ahead."

In a February 2004 review, writer and political blogger Daniel Pipes called the book "soberly presented" and "important", yet about a "frightening prospect" of increasing conspiracism. Ray Pratt said that "despite intelligent efforts to frame the topic conceptually and theoretically, still leaves [him] seeking answers to some bigger questions about why the phenomenon of conspiracy culture persists and even seems to be growing".
