= Michael Barkun =

American political scientist and professor (born 1938)

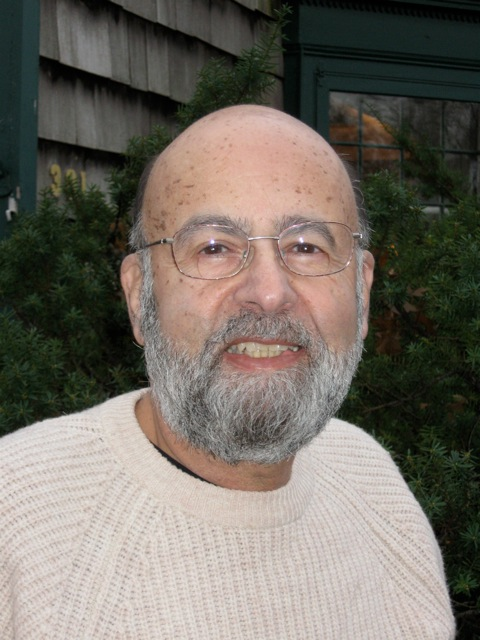
- Barkun in 2009
- Born: April 8, 1938 (age 88)
- Education: Northwestern University (Ph.D)
- Occupation: Political scientist
- Employer(s): Maxwell School of Citizenship and Public Affairs, Syracuse University
- Known for: Study of political extremism, religion and violence, millenarian and utopian movements.

Michael Barkun (born April 8, 1938) is an American academic who serves as Professor Emeritus of political science at the Maxwell School of Citizenship and Public Affairs, Syracuse University, specializing in political and religious extremism and the relationship between religion and violence. He has authored a number of books on the subject, including Religion and the Racist Right (1996), A Culture of Conspiracy (2003), and Chasing Phantoms (2011).

== Early life and education ==
Barkun was born April 8, 1938. Barkun earned his Ph.D. from Northwestern University in 1965.

== Career ==
Barkun serves as Professor Emeritus of political science at the Maxwell School of Citizenship and Public Affairs, Syracuse University, specializing in political and religious extremism and the relationship between religion and violence.

Barkun has acted as a consultant for the Federal Bureau of Investigation; as a member of the Special Advisory Commission to the FBI Critical Incident Response Group from late 1995 to early 1996, he provided training and background presentations on extremist groups. He serves on the editorial boards of Terrorism and Political Violence and Nova Religio, and was the editor of Communal Societies from 1987 to 1994. He edits the Religion and Politics book series for the Syracuse University Press.

Barkun focuses particularly on millenarian and utopian movements, terrorism and "doomsday weapons", and the contemporary influence of the Protocols of the Elders of Zion decades after it was exposed as a hoax.

== Works and ideas ==
Barkun has authored a number of books on the subject, including Religion and the Racist Right: The Origins of the Christian Identity Movement (1996), A Culture of Conspiracy: Apocalyptic Visions in Contemporary America (2003), and Chasing Phantoms: Reality, Imagination, and Homeland Security Since 9/11 (2011). He won the 2003 Distinguished Scholar award from the Communal Studies Association, and the Myers Center Award for the Study of Human Rights for his book Religion and the Racist Right.

His books have been reviewed by The New York Times, The New York Sun, The Montana Professor, and Terrorism and Political Violence. In a 2004 review, historian Paul S. Boyer wrote that Barkun "knows his way around the arcane world of contemporary conspiracy theorists" more "than any other scholar in America".

In his 2003 book A Culture of Conspiracy, he classified conspiracy theories into three kinds:

- Event conspiracy theories: This refers to limited and well-defined events. Examples may include such conspiracy theories as those concerning the assassination of J. F. Kennedy, the September 11 attacks, and the origins and spread of HIV/AIDS.
- Systemic conspiracy theories: The conspiracy is believed to have broad goals, usually conceived as securing control of a country, a region, or even the entire world. The goals are sweeping, whilst the conspiratorial machinery is generally simple: a single, evil organization implements a plan to infiltrate and subvert existing institutions. This is a common scenario in conspiracy theories that focus on the alleged machinations of Jews, Freemasons, communists, or the Catholic Church.
- Superconspiracy theories: For Barkun, such theories link multiple alleged conspiracies together hierarchically. At the summit is a distant but all-powerful evil force. His cited examples are the ideas of David Icke and Milton William Cooper.

Barkun discusses four types of groups categorized by the nature of secrecy involved: a Type 1 conspiracy theory refers to a secret group which acts secretly, and a Type 3 conspiracy theory refers to a known group which acts secretly (Types 2 and 4 lie outside of conspiracy theory).

== Works ==
- United Nations System and Its Functions: Selected Readings (1968; co-edited with Robert W. Gregg). Published in Princeton, NJ by Van Nostrand as a 460-page hardcover and paperback. A part of the Van Nostrand political science series.
- Law Without Sanctions: Order in Primitive Societies and the World Community (1968). Published by Yale University Press as a 179-page hardcover.
- International Law and the Social Sciences (1970; with Wesley L. Gould). Published by Princeton University Press as a 338-page hardcover (ISBN 0691075301).
- Social Science Literature: A Bibliography for International Law (1972; with Wesley L. Gould). Published in Princeton, NJ for the American Society of International Law by Princeton University Press as a 662-page hardcover (ISBN 0691092257). It was republished in paperback in 2015 as part of the Princeton Legacy Library series (ISBN 0691619514).
- Law and the Social System (1973; as editor). Published in New York by Lieber-Atherton as a 128-page hardcover (ISBN 0883110067) and paperback (ISBN 0883110075).
- Disaster and the Millennium (1974). Published in New Haven by Yale University Press as a 246-page hardcover (ISBN 0300017251). It was re-published in paperback in 1986 by Syracuse University Press (ISBN 0815623925).
- Crucible of the Millennium: Burned-Over District of New York in the 1840s (1986) Published by Syracuse University Press as a 194-page hardcover (ISBN 0815623712) and paperback (ISBN 081562378X).
- Religion and the Racist Right: The Origins of the Christian Identity Movement (1994). Published in Chapel Hill, NC by The University of North Carolina Press as a 290-page hardcover (ISBN 0807821454) and paperback (ISBN 0807844519). A revised edition was published in 1997 as a 330-page hardcover (ISBN 0807823287) and paperback (ISBN 0807846384).
- Millennialism and Violence (1996; as editor). Published in London and Portland, OR by F. Cass as a 177-page hardcover (ISBN 071464708X) and paperback (ISBN 0714642509). It was the second in the Cass series on political violence.
- —— (2003). A Culture of Conspiracy: Apocalyptic Visions in Contemporary America. Berkeley: University of California Press. ISBN 0-520-23805-2. A 243-page hardcover book. It was the 15th book in the Comparative Studies in Religion and Society series. A 251-page paperback edition was published in 2006 (ISBN 0520248120). A second edition was published in 2013 as a 320-page paperback (ISBN 0520276825).
- Chasing Phantoms: Reality, Imagination, and Homeland Security Since 9/11 (2011). Published by The University of North Carolina Press as a 208-page hardcover (ISBN 9780807834701). A paperback edition was published in 2014 (ISBN 1469622262).
- Barkun, Michael (October 2016). Campion-Vincent, Véronique; Renard, Jean-Bruno (eds.). "Conspiracy Theories as Stigmatized Knowledge". Diogenes. 62 (3–4: Conspiracy Theories Today). SAGE Publications on behalf of the International Council for Philosophy and Humanistic Studies: 114–120. doi:10.1177/0392192116669288. ISSN 0392-1921. LCCN 55003452. S2CID 152217672.
