= New Order =

New Order may refer to:

== Politics ==
- L'Ordine Nuovo (The New Order), a socialist newspaper edited by Antonio Gramsci in the early 1920s
- New Order in East Asia, propaganda term for Japanese-dominated East Asia announced by Japanese prime minister Konoe Fumimaro in 1938
- New Order (Israel)
  - New Order in the Middle East, the name informally given to Ariel Sharon's plans during the 1982 Israeli invasion of Lebanon
  - 2024 Hezbollah headquarters strike by Israel, codenamed “New Order”
- New Order (Indonesia) (Orde Baru), former Indonesian president Suharto's regime
- New Order (Nazism) (Neuordnung), Nazi term for the set of geopolitical and ideological goals which the Third Reich aimed to impose during the 1940s
  - Ordre Nouveau (1940s), Vichy French term for the above Neuordnung
  - New Order (United States), an American neo-Nazi religious group
  - New Order (Portugal), a neo-fascist party that existed between 1978 and 1982
- New Order (Venezuela), a far-right revolutionary nationalist political party 1974–2002
- Ordine Nuovo, an Italian far right organization
- Ordre Nouveau (1930s), a French non-conformist organization
- Ordre Nouveau (1960s), a French nationalist organisation (1969–73)
- Shintaisei ("New Order" in Japanese), the political movement promoted by the Taisei Yokusankai (Imperial Rule Assistance Association) in World War II

== Arts and entertainment ==
=== Music ===
- New Order (band), a British band formed in 1980, the successor to Joy Division
- The New Order (band), an American hard-rock band including members of the Stooges, the MC5, and Tom Petty & The Heartbreakers
- The New Order (album), a 1988 album by American thrash metal band Testament
- "The New Order", song by Blind Guardian from the 2006 album A Twist in the Myth

=== Film ===
- In the Star Wars franchise:
  - New Order (Galactic Alliance), the new system for the Galactic Federation of Free Alliances established by Darth Caedus
  - New Order (Imperial), the social and political system of the Galactic Empire
  - New Order (Mandalorian), Cassus Fett's ideal of the Mandalorian Neo-Crusaders during the Mandalorian Wars
  - New Order (Separatist), the ideals of the Confederacy of Independent Systems
- The main antagonists of the 1986 film Cobra
- Scanners II: The New Order, a 1991 film
- New Order (film), a 2020 Mexican-French drama film

=== Television ===
- "New Order" (Between the Lines), a 1993 episode
- "New Order" (Code Lyoko episode), a 2005 episode
- "New Order" (Stargate SG-1), a 2004 two part episode
- "The New Order", a Xiaolin Showdown episode

=== Games ===
- Wolfenstein: The New Order, a sequel to the 2009 video game Wolfenstein and a re-imaging of the franchise
- New Order (game), a science fiction play-by-mail game
- The New Order: Last Days of Europe, an alternate history mod for the Paradox strategy game Hearts of Iron IV

== Other uses ==
- Novus ordo seclorum, Latin for "New Order of the Ages", appears on the back of the U.S. dollar bill since 1935
- Novus Ordo Missae, the Roman-Rite Mass as revised after the Second Vatican Council (1962–65)
- Nizam-i Djedid (New Order), series of reforms made by the Ottoman government during the reign of Selim III

== See also ==
- New world order (politics)
- Old Order (disambiguation)
- Estado Novo (disambiguation)
- New World Order (disambiguation)
- NWO (disambiguation)
- Ordre Nouveau (disambiguation)
