= KAOS =

KAOS or Kaos may refer to:

== Arts and entertainment ==
=== Film and TV ===
- Chaos (2024 TV series) (originally Kaos), a Danish romantic comedy series starring Jacob Lohmann
- Kaos (TV series), stylised as KAOS, a 2024 British mythological dark comedy series
- Kaos (film), a 1984 Italian film by Paolo and Vittorio Taviani

=== Fictional characters ===
- The Ancient One (Ronin Warriors) or Kaos, a character from Ronin Warriors
- KAOS (Get Smart), a fictional criminal spy agency in Get Smart
- Kaos, a character from Battle Angel Alita
- Kaos, pen name of a character in the manga series Comic Girls
- KAOS, a character in Donkey Kong Country 3: Dixie Kong's Double Trouble!
- KAOS, a fictional computer from the video game Red Alarm
- Kaos, the main antagonist character from the Skylanders video game series

=== Music ===
- Grupo KAOS, a Puerto Rican merengue music group
- KAOS (FM), a radio station in Olympia, Washington, United States

==== Albums ====
- Kaos (Bo Kaspers Orkester album), 2001
- Kaos (Anita Tijoux album), 2007
- Kaos (DJ Muggs and Roc Marciano album), 2018

=== Other uses in arts and entertainment ===
- Kaos Studios, a defunct video game developer

== Computing ==
- KAoS, a policy services framework
- KAOS (software development), a goal modeling method
- KaOS, Linux distribution

== People ==
- Kaos of Iberia, an ancient king of Causasian Iberia
- Kaos (drag queen), Canadian drag queen
- Kaos One (born 1971), Italian rapper
- Kenny Kaos or Kaos (born 1970), American professional wrestler
- Wych Kaosayananda or Kaos (born 1974), Thai film director

== Other uses ==
- Kaos Worldwide, a maker of technical clothing systems
- KAOS GL, LGBT organisation in Turkey

== See also ==
- k-os, a Canadian rapper
- Radio KAOS (disambiguation)
- Chaos (disambiguation)
