= NWO =

NWO may refer to:

- New World Order
  - New World Order conspiracy theory, a conspiracy theory referring to the emergence of a totalitarian one world government
  - New World Order (professional wrestling), professional wrestling stable (most often stylized as nWo)
  - New world order (politics), any period of history evidencing a dramatic change in world political thought and the balance of power
  - New world order (Baháʼí), teachings in the Baháʼí Faith pertaining to a world federal system of government.
- New Worlds Observer, orbital telescope system
- New World Orphans, album by Hed PE
- Normal weight obesity, the condition of having normal body weight, but with a high body fat percentage
- "N.W.O." (song), 1992 song by Ministry
- WWE No Way Out, professional wrestling event
- The Natural Economic Order (Die natürliche Wirtschaftsordnung), a 1916 book by Silvio Gesell
- Dutch Research Council (Nederlandse Organisatie voor Wetenschappelijk Onderzoek), the national research council of the Netherlands

== See also ==
- New Order (disambiguation)
- NWD (disambiguation)
