= Chaos =

Chaos or CHAOS may refer to:

== Science, technology, and astronomy ==
- Chaos: Making a New Science, a 1987 book by James Gleick
- Chaos (company), a Bulgarian rendering and simulation software company
- Chaos (genus), a genus of amoebae
- Chaos (journal), a scientific journal devoted to nonlinear systems
- Chaos (malware), which infects Windows, Linux, and FreeBSD devices
- Chaos (mathematics), an interdisciplinary area of science and mathematics
- Chaos (operating system), a Linux distribution
- Chaos (physics), a branch of quantum physics
- CHAOS (chess), a chess-playing program developed in the late 1960s
- 19521 Chaos, an object in space

== Mythology, philosophy, and religion ==
- Chaos, a season in the Discordian calendar
- Chaos (cosmogony), in the Greek creation myths
- Chaos magic, a contemporary magical practice
- Liber Chaos, a philosophical treatise by Ramon Llull
- Chaos gods

== Arts, entertainment and media ==
=== Fictional elements ===
- Chaos (Kinnikuman)
- Chaos (Sailor Moon)
- Chaos (Sesame Park)
- Chaos (Warhammer)
- Chaos, in Fabula Nova Crystallis Final Fantasy
- Chaos, in King of Cards (manga)
- Chaos, in Loom (video game)
- Chaos, in The Power of Five
- Chaos, in The Seven Deadly Sins (manga)
- Chaos, in Sonic the Hedgehog series
- Chaos, in Xenosaga
- Symbol of Chaos, a symbol in Michael Moorcock's Elric of Melniboné stories

=== Film and television ===
==== Film ====
- Chaos (2000 film), a Japanese mystery-thriller
- Chaos (2001 film), a French comedy-drama
- Chaos (2005 action film), an action thriller
- Chaos (2005 horror film), an American horror film
- Chaos, a 2006 Polish film directed by Xawery Zulawski
- Chaos (2008 film), a Hong Kong action thriller
- Chaos: The Manson Murders, a 2025 American documentary
- Kaos (film) (Chaos in the U.S.), a 1984 Italian film
- Le Chaos, a 2007 Arabic-language film

==== Television ====
- CHAOS (TV series), a 2011 American TV comedy drama series
- Chaos (2024 TV series) (originally Kaos), a Danish romantic comedy series starring Jacob Lohmann
- "Chaos" (The Good Fight), a 2017 television episode
- "Chaos" (Spaced), a 1999 television episode
- "Chaos", an episode of the Indian TV series The Suite Life of Karan & Kabir
- "Chaos", a 1986 episode of The Transformers

=== Literature ===
- Chaos: Charles Manson, the CIA, and the Secret History of the Sixties, a 2019 book by Tom O'Neill with Dan Piepenbring
- Chaos, a 2016 novel by Patricia Cornwell
- Chaos, an 1898 novel by Alexander Shirvanzade
- "The Chaos", a poem by Gerard Nolst Trenité

=== Music ===
==== Performers ====
- Chaos UK, British punk rock band
- Casey Chaos (1965–2024), American musician

==== Albums and EPs ====
- Chaos (Attila album), 2016
- CHAOS (First of October album), 2022, album by First of October
- Chaos (Paul Bley album), 1998
- The Chaos (album), by The Futureheads, 2010
- Chaos, an album by Rene Aubry, 2017
- Chaos, an album by Jaycee Chan, 2010
- Chaos, an album by Unlocking the Truth, 2016
- Chaos, an album by Josh A & iamjakehill, 2018

==== Songs, singles, and tracks ====
- "CHAOS", a song by VIXX from the 2013 EP Hyde
- "Chaos", a 2007 song by Mutemath
- "Chaos", a song by Unkle from the 1998 album Psyence Fiction
- "Chaos", a song by Tim Sköld from the 1996 album Skold
- "Chaos", a song by Stump from the 1988 album A Fierce Pancake
- Chaos - Part 1 and Part 2, a 1958 novelty 45 RPM record by Stanley Ralph Ross and Bob Arbogast

=== Other uses in arts, entertainment and media ===
- Chaos, a cultural festival of the Indian Institute of Management, Ahmedabad
- Chaos: The Battle of Wizards, a 1985 video game
- Chaos! Comics, a comic book publisher (1994–2002)

== Places ==
- Chaos Reef, in the South Shetland Islands, Antarctica
- Mount Chaos, a mountain in New Zealand

== Other uses ==
- Chaos (professional wrestling), a professional wrestling alliance
- Chaos (roller coaster), in Nashville, Tennessee, U.S.
- Chaos.com, an Australian online retailer
- Operation CHAOS, a CIA domestic espionage project
- Rans S-9 Chaos, an American aerobatic aircraft design

== See also ==
- Chao (disambiguation)
- Community Health Analytics Open Source Software (CHAOSS)
- Chaos Theory (disambiguation)
- KAOS (disambiguation)
- k-os (born 1972), a Canadian rapper
- New World Disorder (disambiguation)
- XaoS, an interactive fractal zoomer program
- Willy-nilly (idiom), an idiom and slang term that pertains to chaos
