= Northwest Division =

Northwest or Northwestern Division may refer to:

- Northwest Division (NBA), one of the three divisions in the Western Conference of the National Basketball Association
- Northwest Division (NHL), one of two divisions of the National Hockey League's Western Conference
- Northwest Division (RHI), part of the Western Conference of Roller Hockey International
- Northwestern Division, one of the nine divisions of the US Army Corps of Engineers

See also NWD (disambiguation)
