= New World Order =

New World Order may refer to:

- New World Order conspiracy theory, believing in plans for a totalitarian world government
- New world order (politics), various periods in history in which major change took place in terms of international relations
- New world order (Baháʼí), Baháʼí doctrine about an anticipated new system of worldwide governance
- New World Order (professional wrestling), a professional wrestling stable

== Books ==
- The New World Order (Wells book), a 1940 book
- The New World Order (Robertson book), 1991, a conspiracy theory of Christian persecution
- The New World Order of Islam, (Urdu: Nizam-e-Nau), a 1942 address by Ahmadiyya Mirza Mahmood Ahmad
- The Gulf Crisis and the New World Order, a 1990 book by Mirza Tahir Ahmad
- The New World Order, a 2004 science fiction novel by Ben Jeapes

== Films ==
- New World Order (film), a 2009 American documentary
- Captain America: New World Order, the former title of the 2025 superhero film Captain America: Brave New World

== Music ==
- The New World Order (album), 1996, by Poor Righteous Teachers
- New World Order (album), 1997, by Curtis Mayfield
- "New World Order", a song by Megadeth from Thirteen
- "New World Order", a song by Gamma Ray from No World Order
- "New World Order", a song by The Kovenant from Animatronic
- "New World Order", a song by The Retrosic from God of Hell
- "N.W.O." (song), a song by Ministry
- "New World Order", a song by Flatbush Zombies
- "New World Order", a recurring track in the game series Danganronpa

== Television ==
- "New World Order" (The Falcon and the Winter Soldier), an episode of the 2021 TV series
- Frankie Boyle's New World Order, a British TV programme

== Other media ==
- The New World Order, a sketch by Harold Pinter
- New World Order (video game), a 2002 video game
- Illuminati: New World Order, a 1995 card game

== See also ==
- New World (disambiguation)
- New Order (disambiguation)
- NWO (disambiguation)
- Novus ordo seclorum (Latin for "New Order of the Ages"), US Great Seal motto
- Old Order (disambiguation)
- World Order (disambiguation)
- New World Disorder (disambiguation)
