= List of FreeBSD malware =

FreeBSD malware includes viruses, Trojans, worms and other types of malware that affect the FreeBSD operating system.

== Threats ==
The following is a partial list of known FreeBSD malware:

- Chaos is a malware that infects Windows, Linux and FreeBSD devices
- Hive, ransomware that encrypts Linux and FreeBSD systems
- Interlock, ransomware targeting Windows and FreeBSD operating systems which appeared at the end of September 2024
