= Space 101 =

Science fiction play-by-mail game

- Publishers: C2 Simulations
- Years active: 1989 to unknown
- Genres: Role-playing, science fiction
- Languages: English
- Systems: computer-moderated
- Players: 15
- Playing time: 15 turns
- Materials required: Instructions, order sheets, turn results, paper, pencil
- Media type: Play-by-mail or email

Space 101 is a space-based, science fiction play-by-mail (PBM) game run by C2 Simulations. The game was closed-end and computer-moderated. Playtest began in 1989.

== History and development ==
Space 101 was a closed-ended, computer-moderated space-based PBM game published by C2 Simulations. The publisher playtested the game in 1989. It was an introductory-level for novice PBM players, in the manner of It's a Crime, made as a simpler version of the publisher's New Order game.

== Gameplay ==
15 players per game could role-play as Builders, Lawyers, Pirates, and Scholars. The 25×25 game map comprised 99 star systems with play starting at the center.

Players win by amassing the most victory points in the 15 allotted turns per game.

== Reception ==
A reviewer in a 1989 issue of Challenge said, "If you are looking for a fun, easy-to-learn, play-by-mail game from a reliable moderator, | would recommend Space 101. Robert Stock reviewed the game in a 1989 issue of Flagship, saying "For someone looking for a fun, uncomplicated sci-fi "shoot 'em up", Space 101 is worth examining."

== See also ==
- List of play-by-mail games

== Bibliography ==
- Martin, Julia (1989). "Reviews: Space 101". Challenge. No. 41. p. 77.
- Stock, Robert (1989). "Back to School for Space 101". Flagship. No. 23. pp. 25–26.
- Helley, Hank (September–October 1989). "Space 101: A Review". Paper Mayhem. No. 23. pp. 17–20.
