= New World Disorder =

New World Disorder may refer to:

- New World Disorder (album), a 1999 album by Biohazard
- New World Disorder (film), a 1999 film starring Rutger Hauer and Andrew McCarthy

== See also ==
- New Disorder Records, an independent record label
- NWD (disambiguation)
- New World Order (disambiguation)
- Chaos (disambiguation)
