= Europe Whole and Free =

Idea in international relations

"Europe Whole and Free" is a concept in international relations that describes a Europe governed universally by concepts of liberal democracy espoused by the United States and the European Union.

== Origins ==
The concept of "Europe Whole and Free" was first used prominently by U.S. President George H. W. Bush in a speech on May 31, 1989, in Mainz, West Germany. Addressing an auditorium full of German citizens and political leaders, including Chancellor Helmut Kohl, Bush laid out his vision for the Europe that should emerge from the end of the Cold War and the waning of communist and Soviet influence in Europe's east. He said:

"…our responsibility is to look ahead and grasp the promise of the future. I said recently that we're at the end of one era and at the beginning of another. And I noted that in regard to the Soviet Union, our policy is to move beyond containment. For 40 years, the seeds of democracy in Eastern Europe lay dormant, buried under the frozen tundra of the Cold War. And for 40 years, the world has waited for the Cold War to end. And decade after decade, time after time, the flowering human spirit withered from the chill of conflict and oppression; and again, the world waited. But the passion for freedom cannot be denied forever. The world has waited long enough. The time is right. Let Europe be whole and free."

Bush's formulation was seen by foreign policy analysts, including Jim Hoagland and Arnold Horelick, as Bush's counter-proposal to the concept of a "Common European Home" offered in the preceding two years by Soviet General Secretary Mikhail Gorbachev. Within two weeks of Bush's speech, Gorbachev also visited West Germany and declared that the Soviet Union would not interfere in the liberalizations already underway among its allied states in Eastern Europe. While Gorbachev hoped to encourage liberalizing political and economic reforms among the Soviet-allied communist rulers of Europe's east, Bush envisioned an end to communist or socialist rule and its replacement by multi-party, liberal democracies with capitalist economic systems.

== Aftermath ==
Less than seven months after Bush's speech, popular protests had forced out the communist governments of Eastern Europe, and Bush and Gorbachev had held a summit meeting in Malta (on 2–3 December), which some observers regarded as marking the end of the Cold War.

In the decades after the Cold War ended and the 1991 collapse of the Soviet Union, European nations and the United States pursued efforts to end the Cold War divisions. As former communist East European countries held free elections and chose non-communist governments, the United States and Western European nations agreed to include them in the continent’s main international institutions, the European Union and the North Atlantic Treaty Organization (NATO), to include former Soviet and Soviet-bloc states.

By 2009, NATO had admitted 12 members from formerly communist-ruled Eastern Europe: Czechia, Hungary, and Poland in 1999; Bulgaria, Estonia, Latvia, Lithuania, Romania, Slovakia, and Slovenia in 2004; and Albania and Croatia in 2009. The European Union added 11 such members: Estonia, Latvia, Lithuania, Poland, Czechia, Slovakia, Slovenia and Hungary in 2004; Bulgaria and Romania in 2007; and Croatia in 2013.

Russia opposed the inclusion of Eastern European nations, and especially the formerly Soviet Baltic states, within NATO. The Russian government's opposition hardened under the leadership of Vladimir Putin (as president during 2000-2008, prime minister during 2008-2012, and again president following 2012).

== See also ==
- Common European Home: a foreign policy concept of Soviet President Mikhail Gorbachev.
- New world order: a slogan used by Gorbachev and Bush to describe the nature of the post-Cold War international system.
