= Radio KAOS =

Radio KAOS may refer to:

- Radio K.A.O.S., a 1987 concept album by Roger Waters
  - K.A.O.S. On the Road, a concert tour by Waters in support of the album
- KAOS (FM), a radio station licensed to Evergreen State College, Olympia, Washington, United States
- Radio Kaos, a Mexican rock band formed in Los Angeles in 1994
- Radio Kaos, a fictional radio station of Kaos in Battle Angel Alita

== See also ==
- KAOS (disambiguation)
