= World Orders Old and New =

1994 book by Noam Chomsky

- Cover of the first edition
- Author: Noam Chomsky
- Language: English
- Subject: International relations
- Publisher: Columbia University Press
- Publication date: 1994, (updated) 1996
- Publication place: United States
- Media type: Print (Paperback)
- Pages: 311
- ISBN: 0-231-10157-0
- OCLC: 36278573
- Dewey Decimal: 327.1/01 21
- LC Class: D860 .C47 1996

World Orders Old and New is a book by Noam Chomsky, first published in 1994 and updated in 1996 by Columbia University Press. In the book, Chomsky writes about the international scene since 1945, devoting particular attention to events following the collapse of the Soviet Union. He critiques Western government, from imperialist foreign policies to the Clinton administration's promises to the poor. His judgment of the "new world order" foresees a growing abyss between the rich and poor, in the United States and internationally.

== See also ==
- American foreign policy
- The Cold War
- Economic systems
- Globalisation
- General Agreement on Tariffs and Trade (GATT)
- Middle East conflicts
