= Chaos Theory (disambiguation) =

Chaos theory is a mathematical theory describing erratic behavior in certain nonlinear dynamical systems.

Chaos Theory may also refer to:

== Film and television ==
- Chaos Theory (film), a 2008 comedy-drama
- "Chaos Theory", an episode of ER (season 9)
- "Chaos Theory", an episode of CSI: Crime Scene Investigation (season 2)
- "Chaos Theory", an episode of The Unit (season 4)
- "Chaos Theory" (Agents of S.H.I.E.L.D.)
- "Chaos Theory" (The Lincoln Lawyer)
- Jurassic World: Chaos Theory, a Netflix-exclusive show in the Jurassic Park franchise

== Other uses ==
- Chaos Theory (demo), a 2006 computer demo by Conspiracy
- "Chaos Theory", an episode of video game Life Is Strange
- "Chaos Theory", a name for a type of German suplex in pro wrestling
- Chaos Theory: Part 1, a 2012 EP by Like A Storm
- The Chaos Theory, a 2002 album by Jumpsteady
- Tom Clancy's Splinter Cell: Chaos Theory, a 2005 video game
  - Chaos Theory – The Soundtrack to Tom Clancy's Splinter Cell: Chaos Theory, by Amon Tobin, 2005
