= Like a Storm =

New Zealander hard rock band

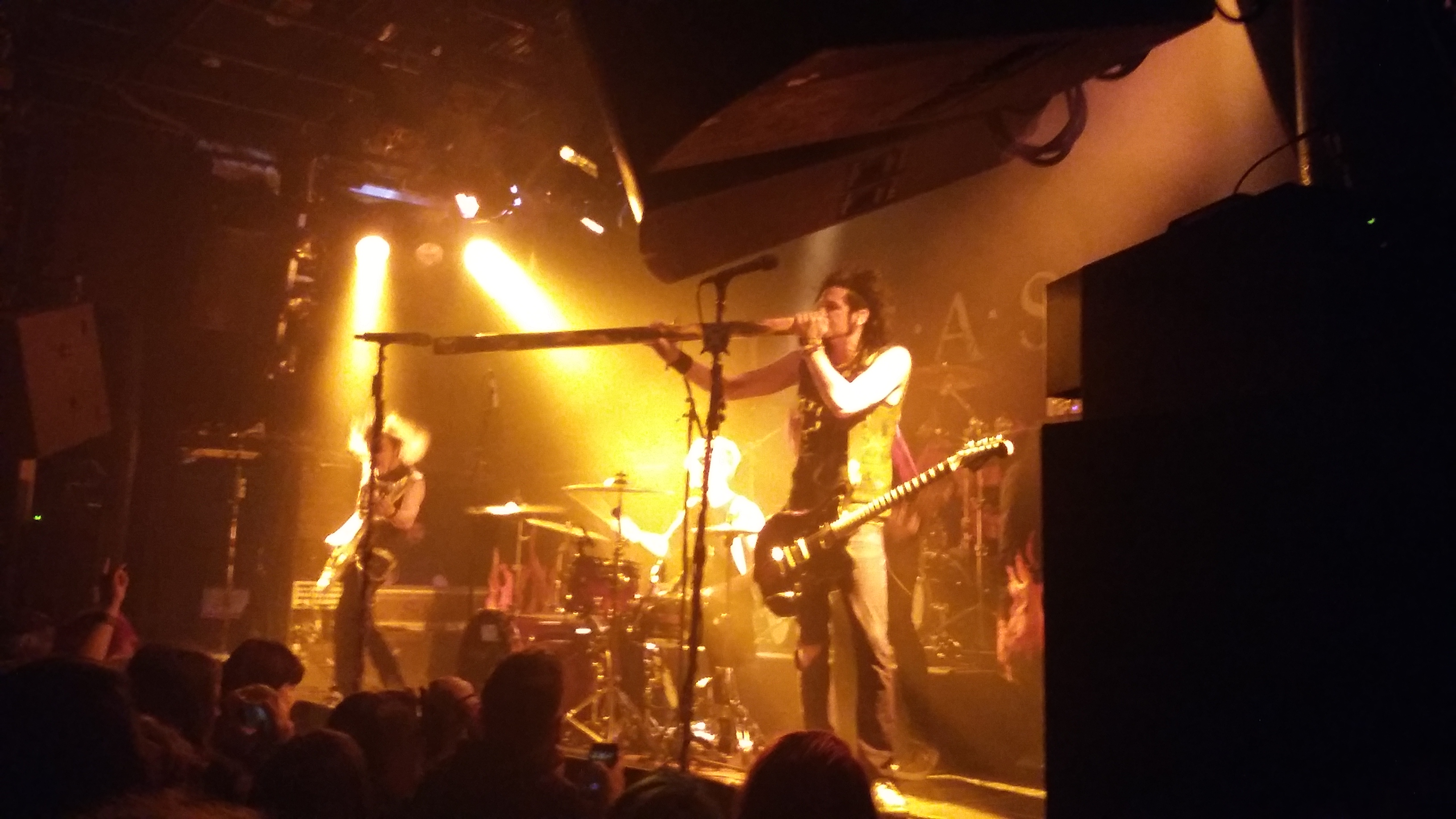
- Chris Brooks playing the didgeridoo live at the Melkweg in Amsterdam (12 February 2016)

Background information
- Origin: Auckland, New Zealand
- Genres: Hard rock, alternative metal, post-grunge
- Years active: 2005–present
- Labels: Century Media (World), Warner Music (NZ)
- Members: Chris Brooks; Matt Brooks; Kent Brooks
- Past members: Paul Sievers; Roye Robley; Thomas Karanasos; Zach Wood

Like a Storm is a hard rock band from Auckland, New Zealand, best known for combining heavy baritone guitar riffs and hard rock songs with didgeridoo. They are the highest charting New Zealand hard rock band in American radio history. Both of their two studio albums, "The End of the Beginning" and "Awaken the Fire", debuted in the Billboard 200. Like a Storm have toured North America extensively as a headline act and have shared American and European stages with Godsmack, Alter Bridge, Gojira, Korn, Shinedown, Three Days Grace, Sevendust, Black Stone Cherry, Steel Panther, and Hellyeah.

== History ==
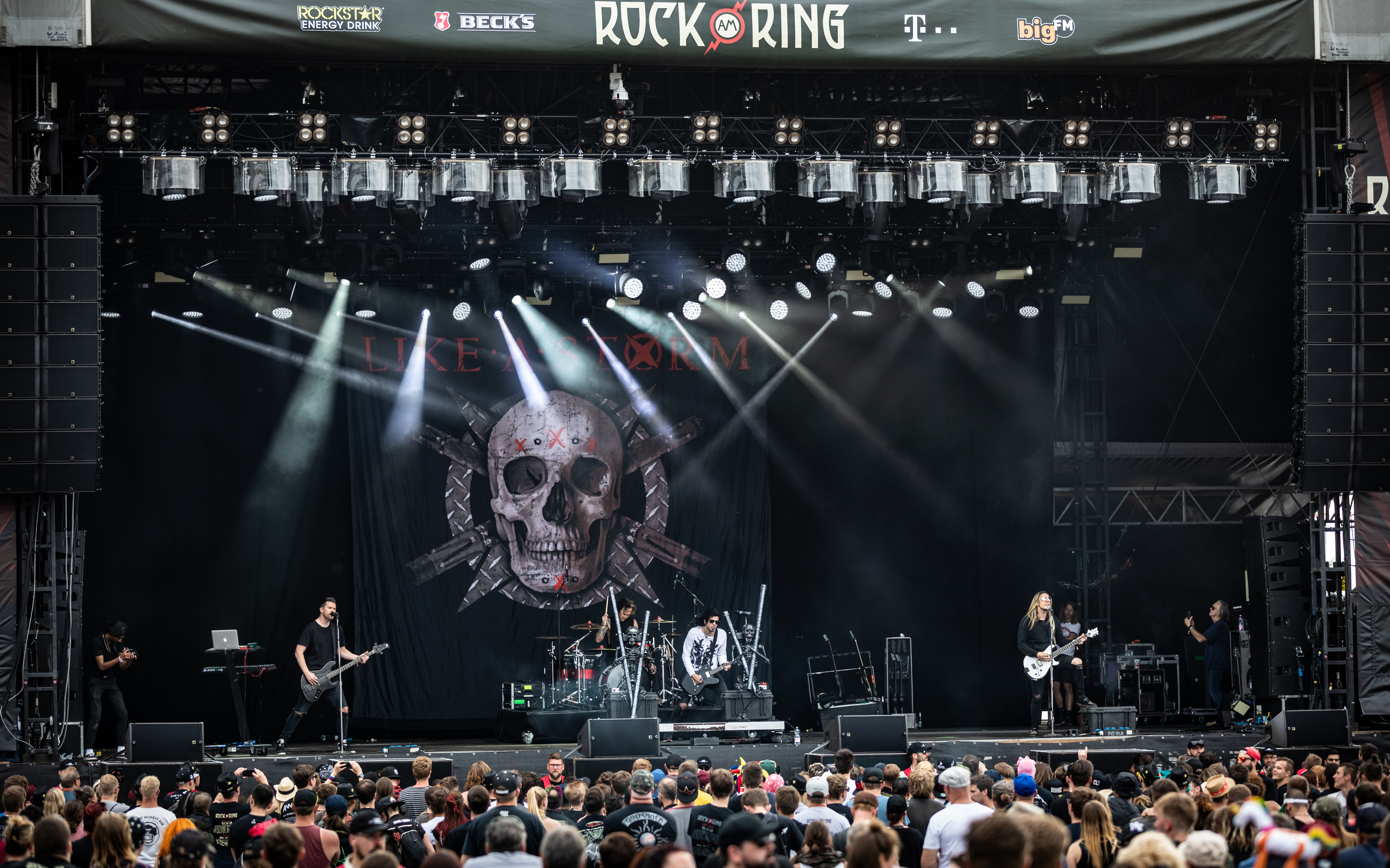
Like a Storm live at Rock am Ring 2019

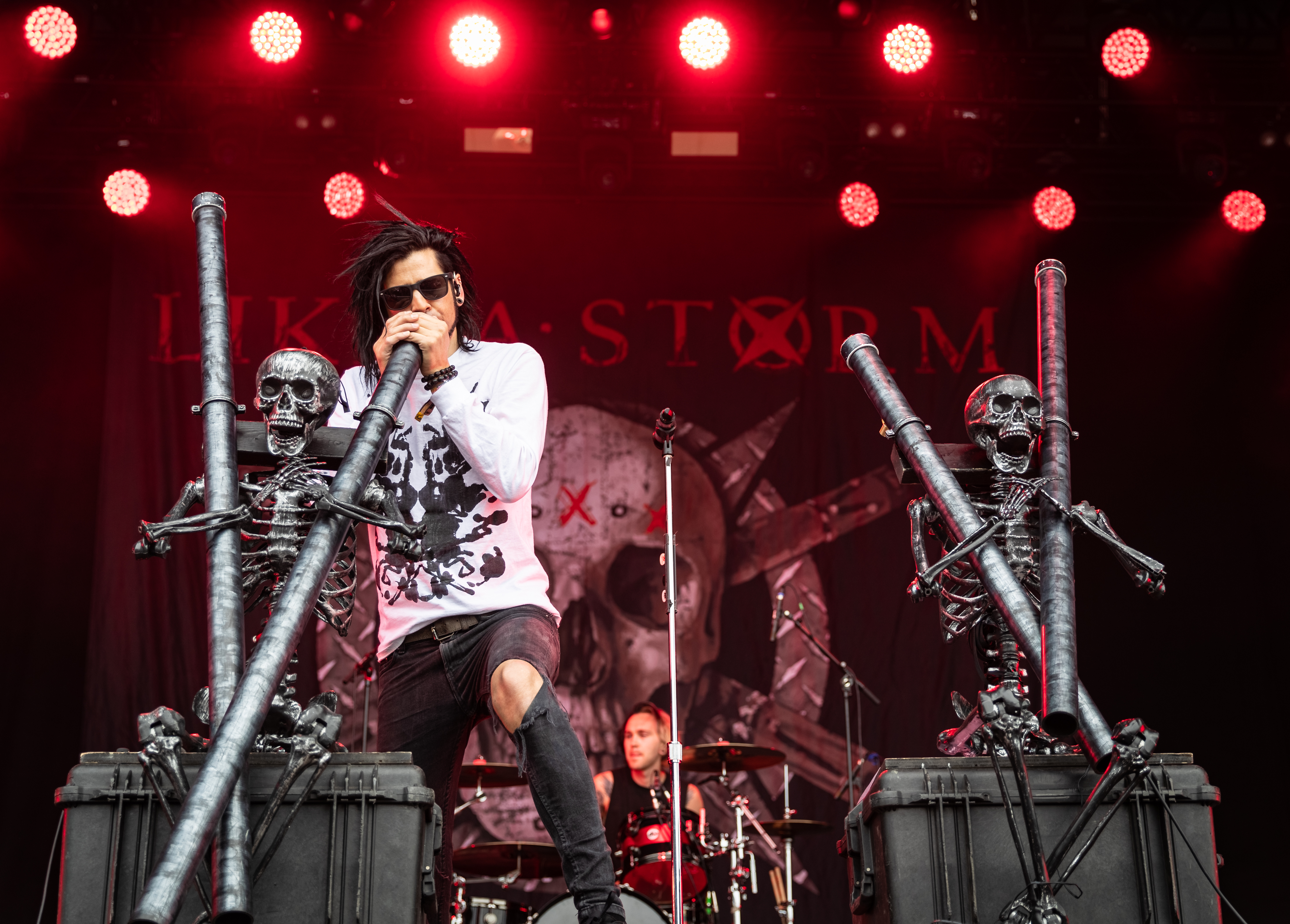
Like a Storm live at Rock am Ring 2019

The band moved from Auckland, New Zealand, to North America. They first began touring the US in 2009, when they were invited to join Creed on their nationwide "Full Circle" Reunion tour. Overwhelming fan response to the band's live show saw their first album, The End of the Beginning, enter Billboard's New Artist Charts at No. 61, as well as the Billboard 200 from tour sales alone.

The band continued extensive American touring into 2010, in support of their first single "Chemical Infatuation" - sharing stages with artists such as Shinedown, Skillet, Puddle of Mudd and Drowning Pool, as well as playing major festivals including Rock on the Range. "Chemical Infatuation" reached No. 43 in the U.S. Active Rock Top 100.

2011 saw Like a Storm complete two tours of the US with Alter Bridge. In between tours, the band entered the studio to record Like a Storm Unplugged, an unplugged album featuring acoustic and piano-driven interpretations of some of their most popular songs. Like a Storm Unplugged, produced and mixed by the Brooks brothers, showcases the Brooks brothers playing a wider range of instruments - including didgeridoo, piano, church organ and djembe. In the words of singer/guitarist Matt Brooks, "We all grew up playing any instrument we could get our hands on, and it's awesome to be able to explore these different ideas within the music of Like a Storm. We see it more as re-building the soundscape with different instruments and textures than stripping the songs down".

In 2011, Like a Storm played main stage slots at 3 summer festivals - Boonstock in Gibbons, Alberta, Canada; "Pain in the Grass" for KISW Seattle; and the PDX "RockFest" in Portland. In December 2011, the band was voted Tunelab's "Most Fan Friendly Band." The Brooks brothers responded by thanking their fans on social networking sites. In January 2012, Like a Storm returned to their native New Zealand for a monthlong holiday, and recorded the band's first unplugged DVD "Southern Skies" which was released 22 February 2012. In the movie Chris, Kent, and Matt take viewers to some landmark places and tell of stories growing up in Auckland before playing acoustic versions of fan favourites while at those sites. Southern Skies also gives you a sneak peek at two new songs off of the upcoming album as well as Matt's humorous home video documenting the little time they spent in Australia. While in their hometown, Matt and Kent went on to do an interview with New Zealand's largest rock radio station. At the time singer/guitarist/didgeridoo player Chris was ill and could not attend. A filmed version of the interview can also be found on the "Southern Skies" DVD.

In the Spring of 2012, the band went out on an acoustic tour of the United States with more than 50 shows to promote the Limited Edition Acoustic EP and their Southern Skies DVD. In these shows the band frequently covered songs from other artists as well, such as: "Have You Ever Seen the Rain?" by Creedence Clearwater Revival and "Simple Man" by Lynyrd Skynyrd.

Shortly after their acoustic tour, the band went back to tour alongside Creed in May 2012 with drummer Roye Robley. Like a Storm also played several festivals in Summer 2012. Shows include: Summerfest in Milwaukee, Wisconsin and Common Ground Music Festival in Lansing, Michigan, Jinxfest and Cornfest in Illinois; among others. The day after headlining Jinxfest, Like a Storm headed off to tour with Creed for several more dates. Their first show of their US headlining tour, titled "Unleash the Chaos", was held on 13 October 2012, in support of their EP, "Chaos Theory, Pt. 1." The first single from the record, "Never Surrender," has a music video that came out 21 November 2012. The seven-track "Chaos Theory Part 1," followed shortly after, being released just two days later. Included in the album is a cover of Coolio's "Gangsta's Paradise" which has received airplay on multiple stations including Sirius XM's Octane.

In 2013, the band released the live double-album Worlds Collide: Live from the Ends of the Earth. The album includes two live discs, recorded on opposite sides of the world. The first CD features Like a Storm's high energy rock show, recorded during an American arena tour - while the second disc showcases the band's unplugged side, and was recorded in their native New Zealand. The album features a range of instruments in addition to the traditional hard rock sound - including didgeridoo, djembe, piano, synthesizers, choirs and programming.

The single "Love the Way You Hate Me" was #1 on Sirius XM Octane in North America for five weeks. Its stateside success makes the band the highest-charting New Zealand rock act in US radio history. The song charted for 19 weeks on the Mainstream Rock chart and peaked at No. 21 there.

Their subsequent single, "Wish You Hell" peaked at #17 on the Mainstream Rock chart. It combines hard rock with delta blues into a sound referred to as "Voodoo Metal", and features slide guitar, jaw harp, and mandolin alongside a heavy rock band track. The third single, "Become the Enemy", peaked at number 11 on the same chart.

The band is signed to Another Century Records. The band's second full-length studio album, and first with record label support, "Awaken the Fire", is also one of the first releases from Another Century. It was written, produced & recorded by the band. Featuring updated versions of the tracks on "Chaos Theory, Pt. 1" along with 4 new tracks, the album was released on 24 February 2015.

In 2015, the band toured in support of Hellyeah alongside of Devour the Day and play festivals including Rock on the Range and Rocklahoma. They also played at Bay City River Roar 2015 in Michigan, along with Devour the Day and Three Days Grace. The band also toured all across Europe supporting the release of "Awaken the Fire". In 2016, they played with many bands such as Righteous Vendetta and OverKast.

On 10 May 2018, Like A Storm announced that their upcoming third album, titled Catacombs, will be released on 15 June 2018.

On 18 May 2018, the band released their latest single "The Devil Inside" off of Catacombs. That same day they released a music video for the track and announced the album would be released on 22 June 2018.

== Musical style ==
Like a Storm's musical style has been described as hard rock, post-grunge, and alternative metal.

== Band members ==
=== Current members ===
- Chris Brooks – lead vocals, rhythm guitar, keyboards, programming, didgeridoo (2005–present)
- Matt Brooks – lead guitar, vocals, keyboards, programming (2005–present) studio drums (2025-present)
- Kent Brooks – bass guitar, backing vocals, guitar, keyboards, programming (2005–present)

=== Past members ===
- Paul Sievers - drums, percussion
- Roye Robley - drums, percussion
- Thomas Karanasos - drums, percussion
- Zach Wood – drums, percussion (2014–2025)

=== Touring Members ===
- Dave Musselman - bass guitar (2024)

== Discography ==
=== Studio albums ===
Title	Details	Peak chart positions					
Title	Details	US	US Hard	US Heat.	US Indie.	US Rock	US Sale.
The End of the Beginning	Released: 29 September 2009; Label: Prospect Park; Formats: CD, digital download	—	—	—	—	—	—
Awaken the Fire	Released: 24 February 2015 (US), 13 March 2015 (UK/EU), 31 July 2015 (NZ); Label: Another Century; Formats: CD, Vinyl, digital download	200	13	5	21	31	—
Catacombs	Released: 15 June 2018 (US), 13 July 2018 (UK/EU/NZ); Label: Red Music; Formats: CD, Vinyl, digital download	—	—	4	—	—	99
Okura	Released: 14 January 2022; Label: Okura Music; Formats: CD, Vinyl, digital download	—	—	—	—	—	—

=== Extended plays ===
- Like a Storm Unplugged (2011)
- Chaos Theory (2012)

=== Live albums ===
- Worlds Collide: Live from the Ends of the Earth (2013)

=== DVDs ===
- Southern Skies (DVD) (2012)

=== Singles ===
Year	Title	Album	Charts	
Year	Title	Album	NZ	US Main. Rock
2010	"Chemical Infatuation"	The End of the Beginning	—	—
2013	"Never Surrender"	Chaos Theory	29	—
2014	"Love the Way You Hate Me"	Awaken the Fire	6	21
2015	"Wish You Hell"	Awaken the Fire	40	17
2015	"Become the Enemy"	Awaken the Fire	—	11
2016	"Break Free"	Awaken the Fire	—	26
2016	"Pure Evil"	Catacombs	—	33
2018	"The Devil Inside"	Catacombs	—	21
2019	"Complicated (Stitches & Scars)"	Catacombs	—	25
2019	"Crawling"		—	—
2020	"The Phoenix"	Okura	—	—
2020	"Empire of Ashes"	Okura	—	—
2021	"F@me"	Okura	—	—
2021	"Liar"	Okura	—	—
2021	"Teardrop"	Okura	—	—
2021	"Death by A Thousand Cuts"	Okura	—	—
2021	"Pull Me From the Edge"	Okura	—	—
2022	"Man in the Box"		—	—
2022	"TNT"		—	—
2023	"Sinners & Saints"		—	—
2023	"Sinners & Saints (Alternative Remix)"		—	—
2024	"Yeah!"		—	—
2024	"All Fucked (Live It Up)"		—	—
2024	"The Final Countdown"		—	—

=== Music videos ===
Year	Title	Director
2010	"Chemical Infatuation"	Yarvo
2012	"Never Surrender"	Christopher Fisher
2013	"Love the Way You Hate Me"	Christopher Fisher
2014	"Nothing Remains"	Jared Ward
2015	"Wish You Hell"	Davo
2015	"Become the Enemy"	Christopher Fisher
2016	"Break Free"	Jared Ward
2018	"The Devil Inside"	Brian Cox
2018	"Pure Evil"	Vince Lundi
2019	"Complicated (Stitches & Scars)"	Ron Thunderwood
2019	"Out of Control"	Ron Thunderwood
2019	"Crawling"	Unknown
2020	"The Phoenix"	Unknown
2021	"Until the Day I Die"	Brian Medeiros
