= Common European Home =

Geopolitical concept

The "Common European Home" was a concept created and espoused by former Soviet General Secretary Mikhail Gorbachev.

The concept has some antecedents in Leonid Brezhnev's foreign policy, who used the phrase during a visit to Bonn, West Germany, in 1981. However, at this time it was likely used in an attempt to sow discord between the United States and the European allies in the hopes of moderating American policy. Though Gorbachev used a similar phrase in a 1985 statement, calling the Old World "our common house," perhaps the most famous use of the term arose when Gorbachev presented his concept of "our common European home" or the "all-European house" during a visit to Czechoslovakia in April 1987. In his main address in Prague he declared:

We assign an overriding significance to the European course of our foreign policy.... We are resolutely against the division of the continent into military blocs facing each other, against the accumulation of military arsenals in Europe, against everything that is the source of the threat of war. In the spirit of the new thinking we introduced the idea of the "all-European house"... [which] signifies, above all, the acknowledgment of a certain integral whole, although the states in question belong to different social systems and are members of opposing military-political blocs standing against each other. This term includes both current problems and real possibilities for their solution.

At the time, Eastern European analysts viewed this rhetoric as a way for Gorbachev to prevent an outright revolt of Eastern European countries from the Eastern Bloc. Jim Hoagland wrote that Gorbachev's "Common European Home" and George H. W. Bush's "Europe Whole and Free" were competing concepts describing the same situation: an economic and ideological collapse of Soviet power concurrent with the European Community gaining new dynamism and economic clout.

On June 12, 1989, General Secretary Gorbachev arrived in Bonn and held private talks with Chancellor Helmut Kohl and President Richard von Weizsäcker. The following day, Kohl and Gorbachev signed a joint declaration supporting national self-determination, mutual reduction in nuclear and conventional forces, and a "Common European Home" in which Canada and the United States have a role. He also stated that by appropriating Charles de Gaulle's "Europe, from the Atlantic to the Urals" geographical definition, Gorbachev was attempting to keep the Soviet Union presence prescribed.

In his July 6, 1989, speech before the Council of Europe in Strasbourg, Gorbachev declared:

The philosophy of the "Common European Home" concept rules out the probability of an armed clash and the very possibility of the use of force or threat of force – alliance against alliance, inside the alliances, wherever. This philosophy suggests that a doctrine of restraint should take the place of the doctrine of deterrence. This is not just a play on words but the logic of European development prompted by life itself.

On November 29, 1989, General Secretary Gorbachev, en route to the upcoming Malta summit with President George H. W. Bush, arrived in Rome, Italy. He gave a speech the next day at the Rome City Council in which he sketched out the notion of the "Common European Home" as a commonwealth of sovereign and economically interdependent nations. He then also proposed a 1990 meeting of the Commission on Security and Cooperation in Europe, and met with Pope John Paul II at the Vatican City the following day.

At the time, analysts such as Robert D. Hormats saw the nascent European Community as primely positioned to take on the role of a Common European Home due to its "moral, political and social – as well as economic – strength." Ronald D. Asmus noted that "Gorbachev's vision of a Common European Home was predicated on the belief that reform in Eastern Europe could be controlled and that reformist communist parties would continue to play an important role in their countries' politics, including in the G.D.R." Finally, Coit D. Blacker wrote that Soviet leadership "appeared to have believed that whatever loss of authority the Soviet Union might suffer in Eastern Europe would be more than offset by a net increase in its influence in western Europe."

== See also ==
- "New world order (politics)": a slogan used by Gorbachev and Bush to describe the nature of the post-Cold War international system.
