= Ordre Nouveau =

Ordre Nouveau may refer to:

- Ordre Nouveau (1930s)
- Ordre Nouveau (1940s)
- Ordre Nouveau (1960s)

== See also ==
- New Order (disambiguation)
