= World Order (disambiguation) =

World order commonly refers to International order

World Order may also refer to:

- World Order (band), Japanese band formed in 2009
- World Order (book), 2014 book by Henry Kissinger

== See also ==
- New World Order (disambiguation)
