= Radio Kaos =

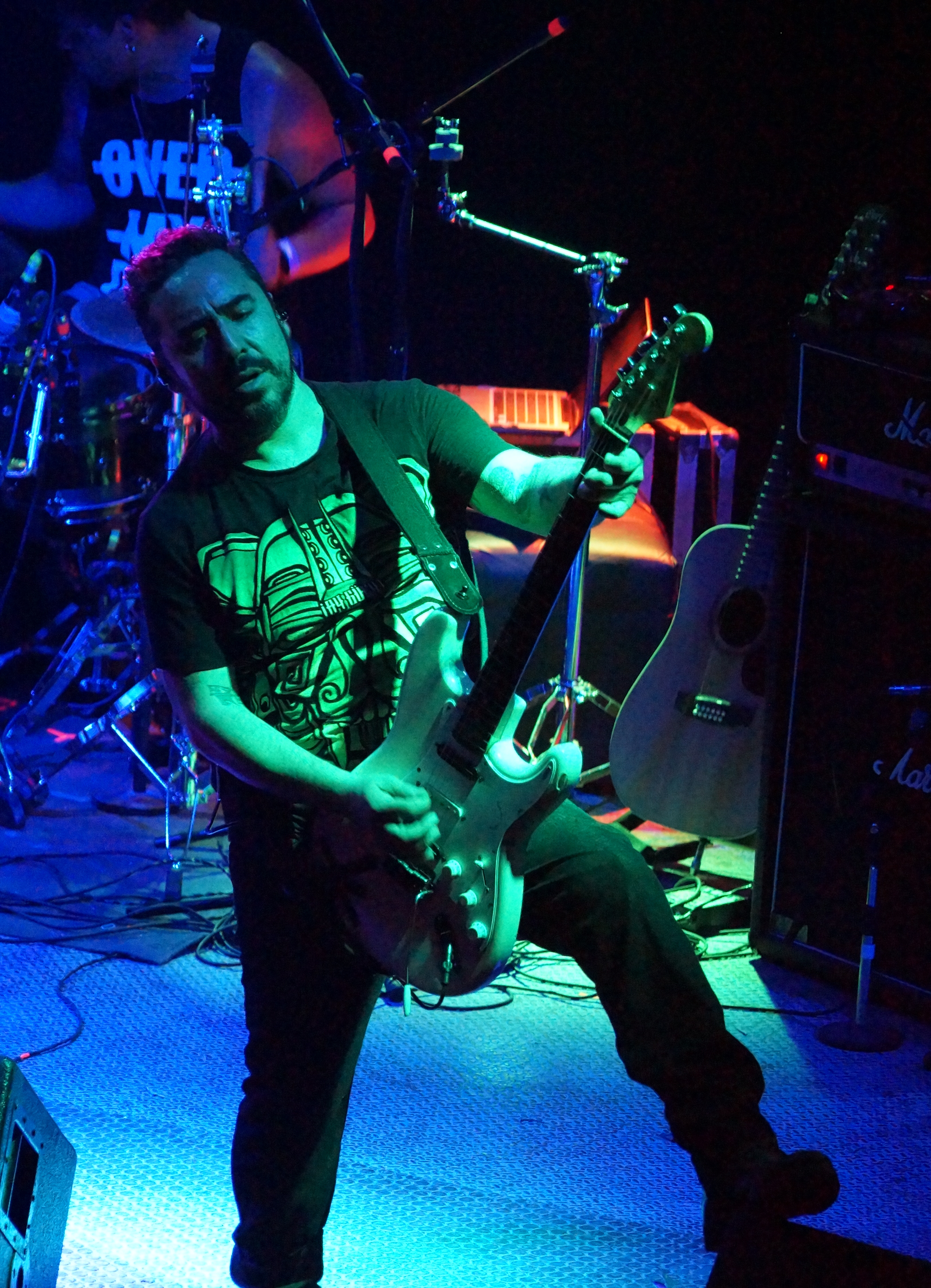
Live concert in 2018

Radio Kaos is a multinational member rock band formed in Los Angeles in 1992. The band was founded by Claudio Pérez (lead Vocals and lyrics/music composer ) and David Pérez (lead/back vocals/Guitar and lyrics/music composer ). The release of their first album Botas Negras (1995) under EMI Capitol was a success in Mexico. Their most recent album, Out in the Blue, was released in 2003.

== Discography ==
- 1996: Botas Negras (or "Black Boots" in English)
- 1998: Radio Kaos
- 2003: Out in the Blue
- 2016: Todo o Nada
