= KAoS =

KAoS is a policy and domain services framework created by the Florida Institute for Human and Machine Cognition. It uses W3C's Web Ontology Language (OWL) standard for policy representation and reasoning, and a software guard technology for efficient enforcement of a compiled version of its policies. It has been used in a variety of government-sponsored projects for distributed host and network management and for the coordination of human-agent-robot teams, including DARPA's CoABS Grid, Cougaar, and Common Object Request Broker Architecture (CORBA) models.
