= Kaos Worldwide =

Private Clothing Company

- Company type: private
- Industry: Textiles
- Founded: Stafford, Texas (1996)
- Founder: Bert Emanuel
- Headquarters: Stafford, Texas, USA
- Area served: International
- Products: Technical clothing
- Website: www.kaoskomfort.com

Kaos Worldwide is a privately held clothing company based in Stafford, Texas that pioneered the category of advanced apparel known as technical clothing systems. Kaos was founded by former NFL star Bert Emanuel and his wife, Teri Emanuel. The company slogan is "Kaos: Feel the Komfort".

The temperature regulation properties of Kaos’ garments are embedded in the yarns, which don't wear off after washing.

== Military ==
In 2009, the company was awarded a $1.5 million, five-year contract to supply sports bras to the United States military. Kaos has already shipped 160,000 of the bras to the Army, and is expected to continue shipping about 20,000 pieces each month.

== Other markets ==
Kaos apparel is also designed for commercial and industrial markets, health care/medical, public safety (law enforcement, firefighters), mail and package delivery and professional and amateur athletes.

All Kaos apparel is composed of materials made in the United States..
