= Estado Novo =

There have been two regimes known as Estado Novo ('New State'):

- Estado Novo (Portugal), or Second Republic, the Portuguese authoritarian regime between 1933 and 1974
- Estado Novo (Brazil), the period from 1937 to 1945, under the leadership of Getúlio Vargas
