= Chaos Theory: Part 1 =

EP by Like a Storm
- Released: December 2012
- Recorded: June – November 2012
- Genre: Hard rock, alternative rock
- Length: 59:17
- Label: Warner (NZ), Independent (rest of the World)
- Producer: Chris, Matt & Kent Brooks

Chaos Theory: Part 1 is the second extended play from the New Zealand hard rock band Like a Storm. Written and recorded while the band was on an American tour, early pre-sales of the album began in November 2012. Chaos Theory: Part 1 was released in New Zealand by Warner Music.

Chaos Theory: Part 1 uses a range of instruments in addition to the traditional hard rock sound including didgeridoo, djembe, piano, synthesizers, choirs and programming. Two rock radio singles were released from the album in New Zealand and America, "Never Surrender" and "Love the Way You Hate Me", the latter reaching No. 6 on the New Zealand Rock Charts.

Produced by Kent, Chris and Matt Brooks, the album was mixed by Elvis Baskette and mastered by Brad Blackwood.

== Track listing ==
1. "Six Feet Under"
2. "Never Surrender"
3. "Gangster's Paradise" (Coolio cover)
4. "Break Free"
5. "Love the Way You Hate Me"
6. "Southern Skies"
7. "Nothing Remains (Nihil Reliquum)"

== Personnel ==
- Chris Brooks - lead vocals, guitar, didgeridoo, programming and keyboards
- Matt Brooks - lead vocals, guitar, programming and keyboards, percussion
- Kent Brooks - bass guitar, vocals, guitar, programming and keyboards

Additional personnel

- Roye Robley - drums
