= Old Order =

Old Order may refer to:

- Old Order Anabaptism, a conservative late 19th century Christian movement among the Amish and other Anabaptist groups.
- Ancien Régime, a term for the aristocratic system before the French Revolution.
- Guided Democracy in Indonesia, also called the "Old Order" (Orde Lama) in Indonesian
- Old Order (Star Wars), the political system of the Old and New Republics and the Galactic Federation of Free Alliances
- The Old Order: Stories of the South, a 1955 collection of short fiction by Katherine Anne Porter

== See also ==
- New World Order (disambiguation)
- New Order (disambiguation)
