= Malta Conference =

Malta Conference can refer to:

- Malta Conference (1945), between Franklin D. Roosevelt and Winston Churchill at the end of World War II.
- Malta Summit (1989), between George H. W. Bush and Mikhail Gorbachev at the end of the Cold War.
