= New Order (game) =

Science fiction play-by-mail game

- Publishers: C2 Simulations, Jade Games
- Years active: 1987 to unknown
- Genres: Role-playing, science fiction
- Languages: English
- Systems: computer-moderated
- Players: 30
- Playing time: Fixed
- Materials required: Instructions, order sheets, turn results, paper, pencil
- Media type: Play-by-mail or email

New Order is a space-based, science fiction play-by-mail (PBM) game run by C2 Simulations. The game was closed-end and computer-moderated. Playtest began in 1987. 30 players vied for control of a galaxy comprising 210 star systems in a game of space exploration centering on colonies. Games lasted about 35 turns, ending when a player achieved about 2,000 victory points. The game received generally positive reviews in gamer magazines in the late 1980s and early 1990s.

== History and development ==
This space-based science fiction game was designed and published by Carl Carpenter from C2 Simulations of Huntington Beach, California. Playtesting began in March 1987. It was a closed-ended, computer-moderated PBM game.

== Gameplay ==
30 players per game vied for control of a galaxy comprising 210 systems and 800 planets. Reviewer Hank Helley stated that the game was about "space exploration, development and conquest". Colonies were central to gameplay. Players options for victory points related to colonies were "establishing, controlling, claiming and destroying". Points scored for these actions depended on the society type a player chose: Crusaders, Imperialist, Pioneers, and Xenophobes.

The game's purpose was to achieve about 2,000 victory points. Games lasted about 35 turns.

== Reception ==
Tim Sullivan reviewed the game in the Winter 1987 issue of Flagship. He stated, "If you're searching for a computer moderated victory-potential space game with a high degree of realism and detail, but which does not require a fanatical devotion of time or effort to play, then New Order is tailor-made for you. Be forewarned, however, that this game requires a commitment of a year or two to see it through to its conclusion." Chris Arnold reviewed New Order in the May 1990 issue of Flagship. He stated, "If you're looking for shoot-'em-up space opera, or lucky rolls of the dice, you won't find them here ... but if you're looking to test your skills at planning and expanding a viable galactic empire, try New Order."

Hank Helley reviewed New Order in White Wolf #16 (June/July, 1989) and stated that "Complex? Yes. Worthwhile? All I can say is that this game showed this old war gamer the joys of PBM. I have been hooked ever since."

== See also ==
- List of play-by-mail games

== Bibliography ==
- Arnold, Chris (May 1990). "New Order: Decisions, Decisions!". Flagship. No. 26. pp. 9–10.
- Plourde, Galen R. (September–October 1987). "New Order". Paper Mayhem. No. 26. p. 19.
- Sullivan, Tim (Winter 1987). "New Order: Depth, Comforts, Limits". Flagship. No. 17. pp. 9–10.
