= Chaos (malware) =

Chaos is a malware that infects Windows, Linux and FreeBSD devices. It is written in the Go programming language. It was discovered by Black Lotus Labs in April 2022. It is used for DDoS attacks and crypto mining. Chaos was believed to be an offshoot of Kaiji, a piece of botnet software.
