= NWD =

NWD may refer to:

- Norwood Junction railway station in south London (Station code)
- New World Development, a Hong Kong company
- NW-D series Walkman, a flash-based line of Walkman from Sony
- Northwestern Division of the United States Army Corps of Engineers
- Non-working day, a term used in flexible working arrangements
- Navisworks, a file format by Autodesk
