= JCAG =

JCAG may refer to:

- Journal of the Canadian Association of Gastroenterology, a medical journal
- Justice Commandos of the Armenian Genocide, a militant organization
