= Young-In Kim =

Canadian gastroenterologist and researcher

Young-In John Kim
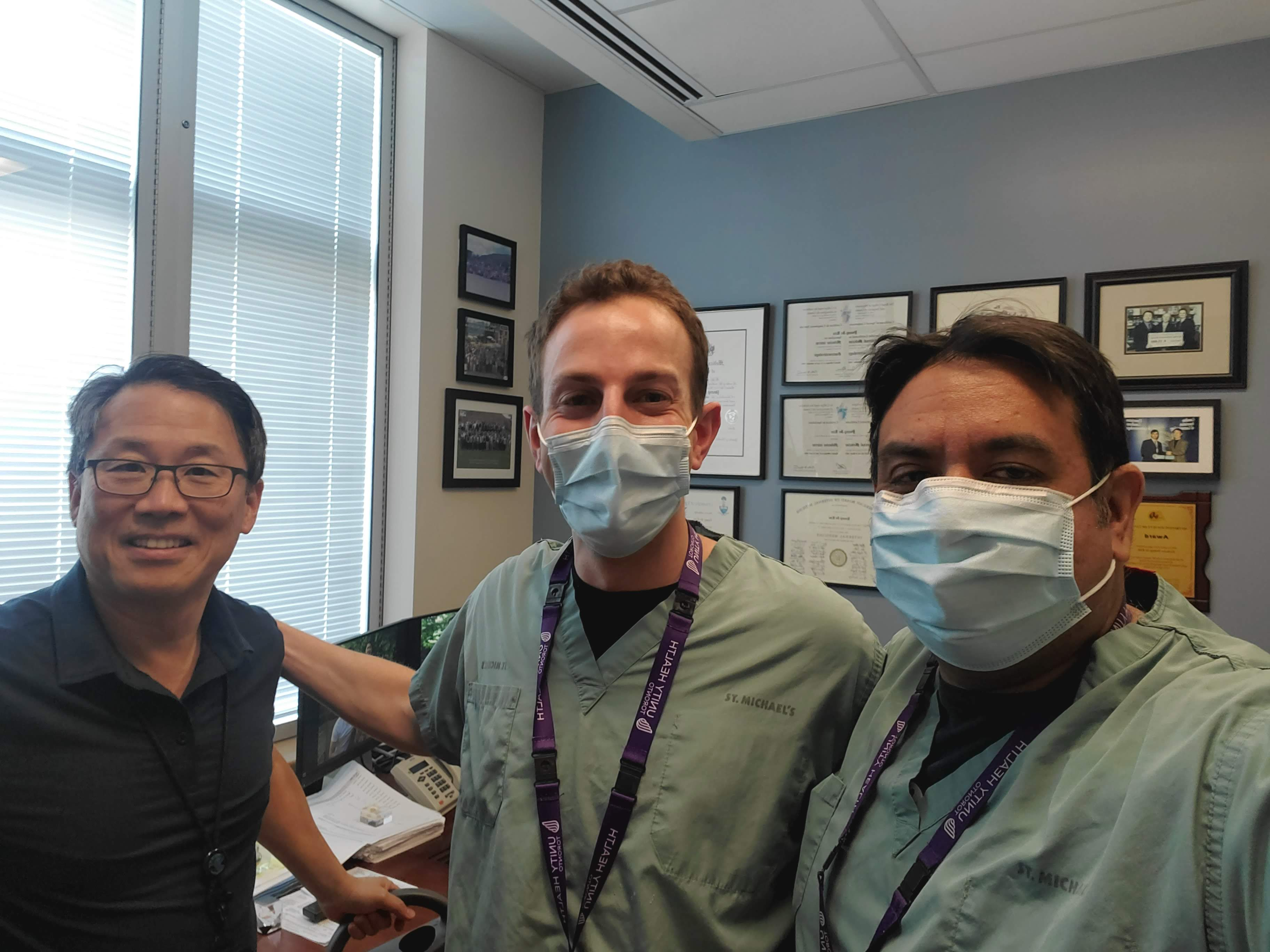
- Young-In Kim (left) with colleagues
- Education: University of Toronto
- Known for: Research on folate metabolism, cancer prevention, and nutritional genomics
- Awards: Canadian Association of Gastroenterology Fellow (CAGF)
- Scientific career
- Fields: Medicine, Gastroenterology, Nutrition
- Workplaces: St. Michael’s Hospital (Toronto), University of Toronto

Young-In Kim is a Canadian physician and researcher specializing in gastroenterology and nutritional sciences. He is a professor in the Department of Medicine and Department of Nutritional Sciences at the University of Toronto and a staff gastroenterologist at St. Michael’s Hospital (Toronto). His research focuses on the molecular and clinical aspects of nutrition and cancer, particularly folate metabolism, colorectal and breast cancer prevention, and epigenetics.

== Education ==
Kim received his M.D. from the University of Toronto in 1987. He completed postgraduate training in internal medicine (1990) and gastroenterology (1992) at the same institution. From 1992 to 1995, he completed a postdoctoral research fellowship in clinical nutrition at the Jean Mayer USDA Human Nutrition Research Center on Aging and New England Medical Center at Tufts University. He also pursued a research fellowship in molecular biology at the Department of Cell Biology, Harvard Medical School (1994–1995).

== Career ==
Kim has been a faculty member at the University of Toronto since 1996, where he has held appointments in both the Department of Medicine and the Department of Nutritional Sciences. He was promoted to professor in 2009. At St. Michael's Hospital, in Toronto, he has served as a staff gastroenterologist and scientist at the Keenan Research Centre for Biomedical Science.

His research investigates the role of nutrition in carcinogenesis, with a focus on folate metabolism, epigenetics, and nutrigenomics. He has led several major studies on the dual modulatory effects of folate in cancer prevention and progression, influencing public health policies on folic acid fortification in Canada and the United States. His work has been cited in reports by the US National Academy of Science and the European Food Safety Authority.

Kim has received numerous research grants from agencies such as the Canadian Institutes of Health Research (CIHR), the Canadian Cancer Society, and the American Institute for Cancer Research.

== Research contributions ==
Kim’s research has significantly contributed to understanding the role of folate in cancer biology. His notable findings include the dual effect of folate on cancer, showing that folate deficiency can increase cancer risk, while excessive supplementation may promote tumor progression; the impact of maternal folic acid supplementation on offspring cancer risk, demonstrating protective effects in colorectal cancer but increased risk for breast cancer; and, the pharmacogenetics of folate metabolism, identifying genetic variants that influence chemotherapy response.

Kim has published over 140 peer-reviewed scientific articles, including original research, reviews, consensus guidelines, and book chapters.

== Honors and awards ==
Kim has received multiple awards for his contributions to gastroenterology and nutrition research, notably being award a fellowship in the Canadian Association of Gastroenterology in 2021.
