= Laura Targownik =

Canadian scientist and physician

Laura Ellyn Targownik
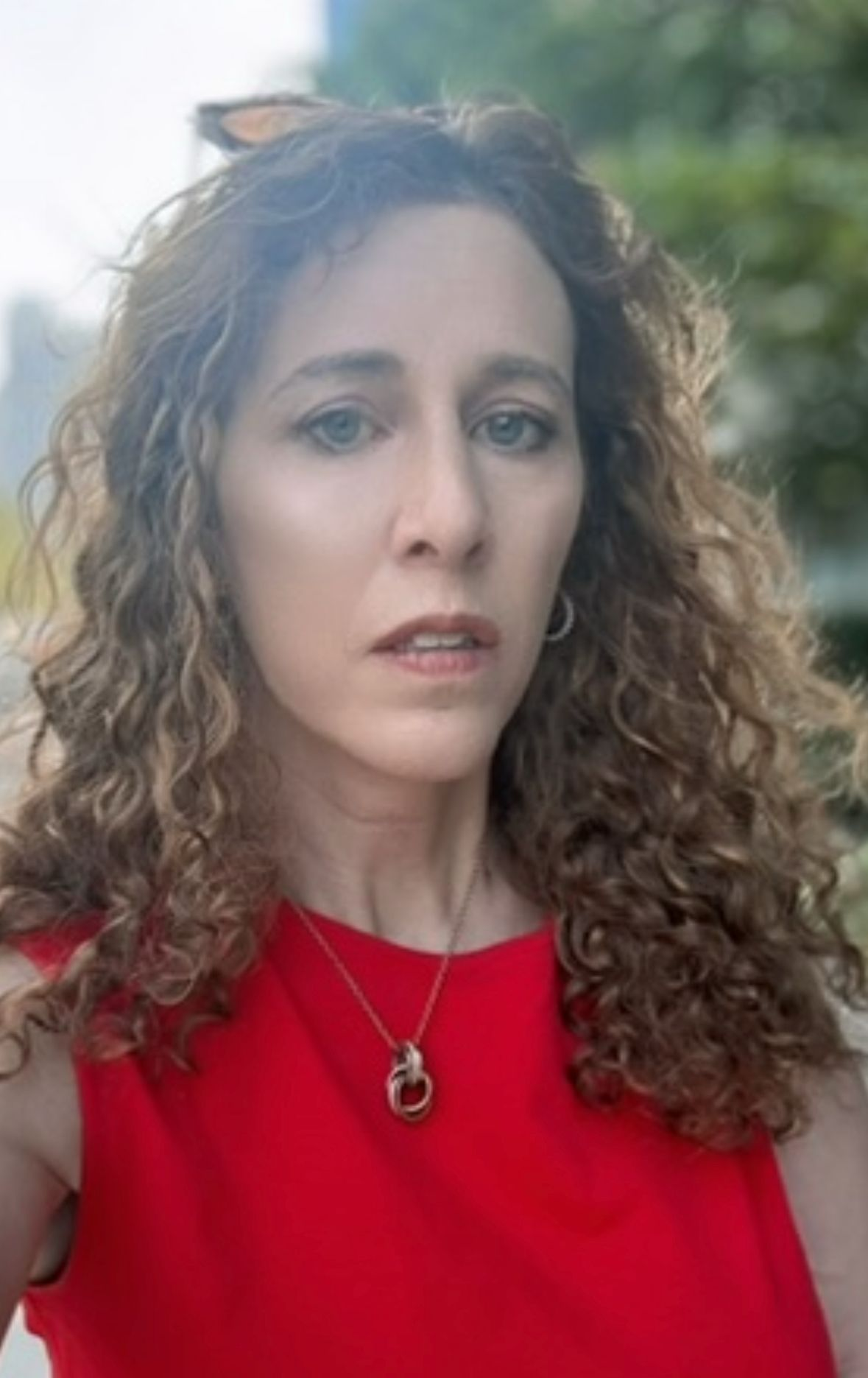
- Born: Winnipeg, Manitoba, Canada
- Education: University of Manitoba (MD); University of California, Los Angeles (MSHS)
- Occupations: Gastroenterologist, epidemiologist, professor
- Known for: Safety of proton pump inhibitors; Epidemiology of Inflammatory bowel disease; Gender equity in medicine
- Awards: Fellow of the Canadian Association of Gastroenterology

Laura Targownik is a Canadian clinician-scientist, gastroenterologist, and epidemiologist. She is the Departmental Division Director for Gastroenterology and Hepatology and Professor of Medicine at the Temerty Faculty of Medicine at the University of Toronto and a staff gastroenterologist at Sinai Health System. She is internationally recognized for her research in pharmacoepidemiology, specifically regarding the long-term safety of proton pump inhibitors (PPIs), and for her work in defining the burden of inflammatory bowel disease (IBD) in Canada. She is also a prominent leader in advocating for gender equity and transgender health rights within the medical profession.

== Education and training ==
Targownik completed her medical education at the University of Manitoba, graduating with her Doctor of Medicine (MD) in 1997. She completed her residency in Internal medicine at the same institution, receiving certification in 2000.

She subsequently pursued advanced specialized training in the United States, completing a fellowship in Digestive Diseases at the University of California, Los Angeles (UCLA) from 2000 to 2003. Concurrently, she earned a Master of Science in Health Services (MSHS) from the] in 2003, where she developed expertise in health services research and epidemiology.

== Career ==
Targownik began her academic career at the University of Manitoba in 2003. She served as an associate professor in the Department of Internal Medicine and held the position of Section Chief of Gastroenterology until 2019. During her tenure in Manitoba, she was an Associate of the Manitoba Centre for Health Policy (MCHP) and the associate director of the IBD Research and Clinical Centre. In these roles, she utilized the province's administrative health databases to establish one of the largest population-based IBD cohorts in North America.

In July 2019, she was recruited to the University of Toronto to serve as the Departmental Division Director (DDD) for Gastroenterology and Hepatology. She is a clinician-scientist at the Mount Sinai Hospital Inflammatory Bowel Disease Centre and also holds a Status-Only appointment at the Institute of Health Policy, Management and Evaluation (IHPME).

== Research contributions ==
Targownik has authored over 180 peer-reviewed articles. Her research primarily leverages large administrative datasets to evaluate the real-world safety and effectiveness of medications used in gastroenterology.

=== Proton pump inhibitors and bone health ===
One of Targownik's most prominent contributions is her research into the adverse effects of long-term acid suppression therapy. In 2008, she published a landmark study in the Canadian Medical Association Journal (CMAJ) titled "Use of proton pump inhibitors and risk of osteoporosis-related fractures." The study was among the first to identify a correlation between continuous PPI use and an increased risk of hip fractures, hypothesizing that acid suppression may inhibit calcium absorption. This work influenced global clinical guidelines regarding the "deprescribing" of PPIs for patients with mild symptoms.

=== Epidemiology of inflammatory bowel disease ===
Targownik is a key member of the Canadian Gastrointestinal Epidemiology Consortium (CanGIEC) and the Canadian IBD Research Consortium (CIRC). She has contributed to major national reports forecasting the burden of IBD in Canada. Her work on the "2035 Projections" highlighted that the prevalence of IBD in Canada is expected to exceed 1% of the population by 2035, driven largely by the aging of the current patient cohort and rising pediatric incidence.

She has also investigated therapeutic strategies, publishing research demonstrating that early initiation of anti-TNF biologic therapy in Crohn's disease is associated with reduced long-term healthcare utilization, a finding that supports "top-down" treatment approaches for high-risk patients.

== Advocacy and leadership ==
Targownik is a vocal advocate for equity, diversity, and inclusion (EDI) in Canadian medicine. She served as the chair for Equity and Diversity for the Canadian Association of Gastroenterology (CAG). In this capacity, she led the establishment of the "GI Women CAN!" task force, which aims to address the underrepresentation of women in gastroenterology leadership roles and improve mentorship for female trainees. Her research has quantified the "leaky pipeline" in the specialty, documenting the disparity between the number of women entering the field and those achieving senior academic ranks.

Targownik has spoken publicly about her experiences to raise awareness of the barriers transgender individuals face in healthcare settings. She advocates for the creation of safe, inclusive clinical environments and has called for academic institutions to be strategic in their allyship with the 2SLGBTQ+ community.

== Awards and honors ==
- 2020: Fellow of the Canadian Association of Gastroenterology (CAGF).
