= Alan Barkun =

Canadian gastroenterologist and professor

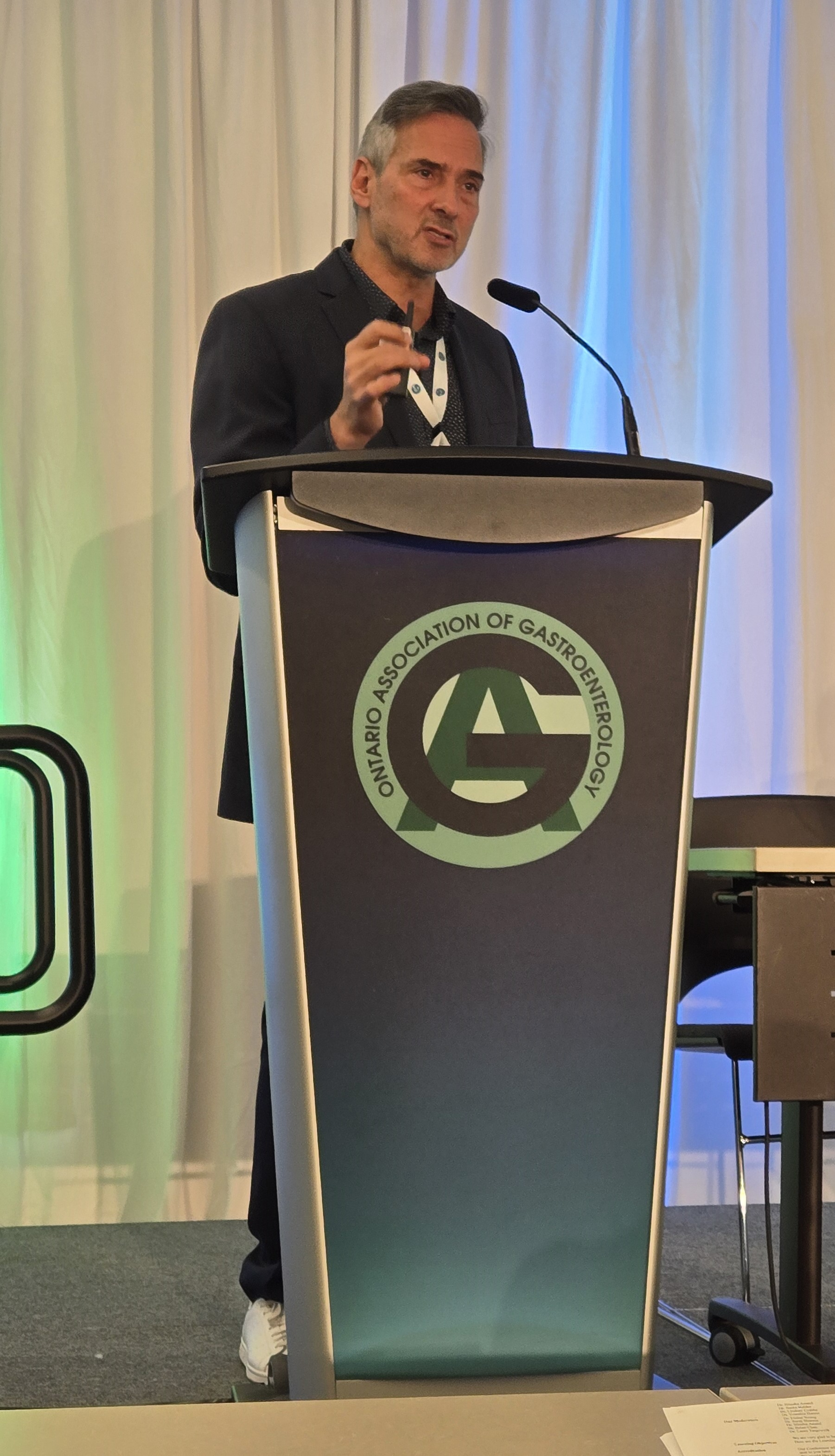
- Alan Barkun in 2024
- Education: McGill University
- Known for: Research in therapeutic endoscopy and management of gastrointestinal bleeding; development of clinical guidelines in gastroenterology.
- Awards: American Digestive Health Foundation–ASGE Research Scholar Award; Canadian Association of Gastroenterology Visiting Professor Award; André Viallet Award; CAG Clinical Achievement Award
- Scientific career
- Fields: Gastroenterology, Therapeutic endoscopy, Clinical research
- Workplaces: McGill University Health Centre, McGill University

Alan N. Barkun is a Canadian gastroenterologist, clinician-scientist, and professor of medicine at McGill University. He specializes in gastroenterology and therapeutic endoscopy, with an academic focus on the management of gastrointestinal bleeding and evaluating new endoscopic technologies. Barkun serves as the Director of Digestive Endoscopy at the McGill University Health Centre (MUHC) and holds the Douglas G. Kinnear Chair in Gastroenterology at McGill. Over his career, he has published hundreds of scientific articles and helped develop clinical practice guidelines in gastroenterology, earning multiple national and international awards for his contributions.

== Early life and education ==
Barkun obtained his Doctor of Medicine and Master of Surgery (M.D., C.M.) degree from McGill University in 1983. He then completed his residency in internal medicine and a fellowship in gastroenterology at McGill, followed by advanced training in hepatogastroenterology at the Edouard-Herriot Hospital in Lyon and in therapeutic endoscopy at Duke University Medical Center in North Carolina. In 1995, he earned a Master of Science (M.Sc.) degree in epidemiology and biostatistics from McGill. Barkun is a Fellow of the Royal College of Physicians and Surgeons of Canada and has been elected a fellow of several professional organizations, including the American College of Physicians, the American College of Gastroenterology, the American Gastroenterological Association, and the American Society for Gastrointestinal Endoscopy.

== Career ==
Barkun joined the faculty of McGill University's Department of Medicine in 1990. He served as the head of the Division of Gastroenterology at the Montreal General Hospital from 1998 to 2008. He is now a full Professor of Medicine at McGill and the inaugural holder of the Douglas G. Kinnear Chair in Gastroenterology. At the McGill University Health Centre (MUHC), Barkun serves as Director of Digestive Endoscopy and previously led the advanced therapeutic endoscopy fellowship training program, while also acting as Chief Quality Officer for the Division of Gastroenterology. He has additionally chaired the Quebec provincial colorectal cancer screening implementation committee, helping to establish screening guidelines and quality standards for colonoscopy across the province. Barkun has participated in numerous volunteer missions to Africa and Asia over the past 10 years, providing formal on site teaching, hands-on procedural skills training in endoscopy, and carrying out complex digestive therapeutic endoscopy care to patients.

== Research focus ==
Barkun's research has centered on the evaluation of new and existing gastrointestinal endoscopic techniques and the improvement of outcomes for patients with digestive diseases, particularly upper gastrointestinal bleeding. He has conducted numerous clinical trials and epidemiologic studies, particularly in the management of nonvariceal upper gastrointestinal bleeding, biliary and pancreatic disorders, and colorectal cancer screening. Barkun led a Canadian initiative to study upper GI hemorrhage, culminating in the Registry on Upper Gastrointestinal Bleeding and Endoscopy (RUGBE), which yielded data for several high-impact publications and informed international consensus guidelines in this area. He was the first author of two widely cited international guidelines on the management of nonvariceal upper GI bleeding and subsequently investigated ways to enhance the uptake of these guidelines in clinical practice. He has chaired guideline panels principally on gastrointestinal bleeding, and more recently on use of antithrombotic medications and digestive endoscopy, in addition to inflammatory bowel disease and colonoscopy standards.

Barkun has contributed to advances in therapeutic endoscopy for hepatobiliary and other gastrointestinal disorders. He co-authored one of the first randomized trials comparing open versus laparoscopic cholecystectomy, demonstrating the benefits of the laparoscopic approach. He also helped develop a risk stratification system for identifying patients at high risk of common bile duct stones, which has been incorporated into clinical guidelines for gallstone management. His series of meta-analyses clarified the role of endoscopic interventions such as biliary stenting in malignant bile duct obstruction. Barkun has been at the forefront of introducing novel hemostatic therapies (for example, hemostatic powders) to treat gastrointestinal bleeding. He played a key role in quality improvement initiatives in endoscopy and was the clinical lead in establishing Quebec's colorectal cancer screening program, including the development of provincial screening guidelines and colonoscopy quality standards.

== Editorial contributions ==
Barkun has been active in scholarly publishing and professional societies. He has served on the editorial boards of numerous gastroenterology journals and is an associate editor for Gastroenterology and previously the Journal of the Canadian Association of Gastroenterology. In addition, he has reviewed manuscripts for dozens of journals and funding agencies worldwide. Barkun has also chaired or co-chaired several national and international guideline panels and consensus conferences in gastroenterology, including committees on inflammatory bowel disease and colonoscopy quality standards.

== Awards and recognition ==
Barkun has received numerous honors for his contributions to gastroenterology. Early in his career, he was the first Canadian to receive the American Digestive Health Foundation–ASGE Research Scholar Award for emerging clinician-scientists. The Canadian Association of Gastroenterology (CAG) honored him with a Visiting Professor Award for outstanding contributions to research and education, and he received the André Viallet Award from the Quebec Association of Gastroenterology for lifetime achievement in the field. In 2014, he was selected to deliver the CAG's Ivan Beck Memorial Lecture, an honor given annually to a distinguished educator in gastroenterology. In 2025, Barkun was the recipient of the CAG Clinical Achievement Award, recognizing his career accomplishments in clinical practice.
