= GMO conspiracy theories =

Conspiracy theories related to GMOs

GMO conspiracy theories are conspiracy theories related to the production and sale of genetically modified crops and genetically modified food (also referred to as genetically modified organisms or "GMOs"). These conspiracy theories include claims that agribusinesses, especially Monsanto, have suppressed data showing that GMOs cause harm, deliberately cause food shortages to promote the use of GM food, or have co-opted government agencies such as the United States Food and Drug Administration or scientific societies such as the American Association for the Advancement of Science.

Critics charge that GMO conspiracy theories are largely promulgated by those opposing the production and sale of GMOs, and instances of unsubstantiated conspiracy theories have lately occurred in the context of public health issues that are mostly unrelated to GMOs, including the 2015–16 Zika virus outbreak and concerns over food safety at Chipotle Mexican Grill.

== Context ==
The existence of conspiracy theories relating to the fear over GMOs has been attested to by scientists, journalists, and skeptics who oppose much anti-GMO activism. Such commentators include Michael Shermer (writer of a monthly Skeptic column series for Scientific American), Mark Lynas (an environmental activist and writer who opposed GMOs for years but in 2013 switched positions), and Jon Entine (the founder and head of an advocacy organization dedicated to advancing the case in favor of genetic engineering in agriculture and biotechnology). Academics writing about bioethics and science communication have also taken note.

A 2013 paper published in the journal PLOS ONE found statistical evidence that linked conspiracy theorist ideation as being a significant factor in the rejection of scientific propositions about genetically engineered food. One GMO conspiracy theory was identified by biochemist Paul Christou and horticulturalist Harry Klee as a claim that development and promotion of GMOs was done by pesticide companies to cause crops to become more vulnerable to pests and therefore require more pesticides, while philosopher Juha Räikkä identified a conspiracy theory that claims the lack of any reliable scientific evidence that show harmful effects of GMOs is due not to a lack of evidence but rather to a conspiracy to hide that evidence.

Conspiracy theories involving GMOs and their promoters have been invoked in a variety of contexts. For example, in commenting on the Séralini affair, an incident that involved the retraction of a much-criticized paper which claimed harmful effects of GMOs in lab rats, American biologist PZ Myers said that anti-GMO activists were claiming the retraction was a part of "a conspiracy to Hide the Truth™". A work seeking to explore risk perception over GMOs in Turkey identified a belief among the conservative political and religious figures who were opposed to GMOs that GMOs were "a conspiracy by Jewish Multinational Companies and Israel for world domination" while a Latvian study showed that a segment of the population of that country believed that GMOs were part of a greater conspiracy theory to poison the population of the country.

A study of media rhetorical devices used in Hunan, China found that the news articles that were opposed to trials of golden rice promoted conspiracy theories "including the view that the West was using genetic engineering to establish global control over agriculture and that GM products were instruments for genocide". Likewise, a study of the rhetoric used in public policy debates about genetically modified food in Ghana showed that conspiracy theories were a feature of a civil society opposition to GMOs:

Government and scientists were denying the claim that GMO was discriminatory and posed significant human health risk, as well as the call to action to do something about GMOs. Civil society adapted the counter rhetoric of insincerity, claiming that scientists had some kind of "hidden agenda" behind their claim, such as eagerness to just earn money from their patents on GMOs. It is imperative that communication on GMOs includes the underlying assumptions, the uncertainties and the probabilities associated with both best and worst case scenarios. This is a necessary condition to minimise misinformation on GMOs but may be insufficient to completely erase conspiracy theories from the minds of the public especially when scientists and government are perceived to be biased towards multinational corporations that are ostensibly preoccupied with making profits.

Social critic Margit Stange contextualized certain arguments adopted by GMO conspiracy theorists as being part of the larger controversy surrounding the subject:

The corporate push for genetically modified food arouses great suspicion. Critics charge that GM food ("Frankenfood") is profitable to industry not only because it can be patented but because crop uniformity will eventually drive up pesticide demand. The charge that big food interests take advantage of poverty to open new markets for GM food is restated by conspiracy theorists, who describe a deliberate macroeconomic creation of food shortages in impoverished nations in order to open the door to GM food. The food industry's opposition to GM food labeling and precautionary measures fuels such suspicions.

This view was echoed by bioethicist Michael Reiss and moral philosopher Roger Straughan who explain in their book Improving Nature?: The Science and Ethics of Genetic Engineering that fears about the consolidation of power by a few agrochemical companies over farmers is a main argument against new genetic engineering technology in agriculture: "At its extreme, this fear belongs to the conspiracy-theory genre and, to caricature somewhat, envisages powerless farmers forced to pay ever increasing amounts to anonymous international companies who profit from the cost of the crop seed and from the cost of the herbicides used to spray them."

Political science professors Joseph Uscinski and Joseph M. Parent in their book American Conspiracy Theories summarized the people that have adopted GMO conspiracy theories thusly:

Another prototypical conspiratorial movement involves those opposed to genetically modified organisms (GMO), in essence a protest against the genetic engineering of food. Not everyone who opposes GMOs is a conspiracy theorist: reasonable people can disagree about research and fail to see small groups of people covertly working against the common good. But most visible and vocal members of this movement, however, are conspiracy theorists. They believe that genetically modified foods are a corporate plot, led by the giant multinational Monsanto, to profit off unhealthy food.

Uscinski, writing for Politico in the context of the 2016 United States presidential election, identified GMO conspiracy theories as one of the "honorable mentions" appended to his list of the "five most dangerous conspiracy theories of 2016". He specifically singled-out candidates Bernie Sanders and Jill Stein as promulgators. Michael Shermer and Pat Linse, writing for Skeptic magazine, specify that in terms of political ideology, "GMO conspiracy theories are embraced primarily by those on the left."

Scholars have identified ways that the internet has aided proliferation and connection between conspiracy theories including those about GMOs. For example, computer scientists Tanushree Mitra and Mattia Samory found in a 2018 study that "[to]pics [such as] "big pharma," "vaccines," and "GMO," for example, decry the corruption of health services while promoting the virtues of a "natural" lifestyle." MIT Technology Review reported in February 2018 that Russian-backed disinformation campaigns were sowing public confusion about GMOs by promoting conspiracy theories.

== Monsanto ==
A major aspect of many conspiracy theories is the fear that large agribusinesses, especially Monsanto are working to undermine the health and safety of the general public by introducing and promoting GMOs in the food supply. One claim is that Monsanto is deliberately hiding scientific evidence that GMOs are harmful. Some anti-GMO activists claimed that Monsanto infiltrated both the American Food and Drug Administration and the American Association for the Advancement of Science which is why the two organizations have supported the scientific evidence for the safety of the genetically engineered food available for human consumption. Jeffrey M. Smith is identified in the book American Conspiracy Theories as arguing that Monsanto has captured the FDA and many other countries. In the compendium Agricultural and Food Controversies, the authors who are social scientists and food scientists trace the conspiracy theory relating in particular to Monsanto back to events in the early 1990s:

There are some well-qualified dissenting scientists and a motivated group of food activists behind them, pushing back against GM food. They believe a GM crop is not substantially equivalent to traditional crops. Moreover, they believe that the FDA follows the substantial equivalence rule not because of the science, but because the FDA was corrupted by corporate influence. This is not a belief that the authors' share, but there are smart people of high character who do believe this conspiracy theory, and their side of the story deserves to be heard.

In The World According to Monsanto, author Marie-Monique Robin describes how the substantial equivalence began with a 1992 policy statement by the FDA under the leadership of a former Monsanto lawyer, who, after working in the FDA, returned to Monsanto as vice president. Her story suggests that GM regulations were the product of a revolving-door system where regulators are former and/or future employees of the company being regulated (note that some argue Monsanto wanted excess regulations to keep out competitors, but that is not Robin's story). It is not hard to imagine a company rewarding lenient regulators with a nice job, and food activists have websites listing powerful government officials and their relation to Monsanto and other corporations. If this sounds like a conspiracy theory (a term not meant as a euphemism), it is.

Belief that Monsanto is particularly problematic has inspired such actions as the March Against Monsanto and the singling out of Monsanto over other agribusinesses such as DuPont, Syngenta, Dow, BASF and Bayer, and has been identified as a salient feature of anti-GMO activism.

An example of Monsanto-based conspiracy theorizing were the claims by some anti-GMO activists that Monsanto banned GMOs from their cafeterias while promoting them for sale and consumption by the public. Anti-GMO/chemtrail blogger Barbara H. Peterson, a retired correctional officer and rancher, complained that Monsanto "has painted those of us attempting to shed light on the dangers of genetically modified/engineered organisms (GMOs) as 'conspiracy theorists'...." She went on to attack Monsanto's suggestion that sabotage could be a possible explanation for the discovery of a few plants of experimental genetically modified wheat found inexplicably growing on a farm in Oregon as being a conspiracy theory itself.

=== GMO cannabis hoax ===
A 2015 internet hoax purporting to show that Monsanto was creating genetically modified cannabis to supply to the cannabis industry. The hoax was created by satirical fake news website World News Daily Report on April 9, 2015. Monsanto created a "standing denial" of the hoax on their "Myths About Monsanto" webpage, and tweeted a disclaimer prior to the 420 holiday in 2016, and on April 20, 2017, again tweeted "Happy 4-20. Time for our yearly reminder: Monsanto has not and is not working on GMO marijuana."

== Other agribusiness ==
In Turkey, a 2013 paper identified a belief among the conservative political and religious figures who were opposed to GMOs that GMOs were "a conspiracy by Jewish Multinational Companies and Israel for world domination." Additionally, a Latvian study showed that a segment of the population believed that GMOs were part of a greater conspiracy theory to poison the population of the country.

== Zika virus ==
In January 2016, concerns over a Zika virus outbreak were accompanied by claims first published on Reddit that the virus was being spread by a genetically modified mosquito. The fears were based in part because of a new mosquito abatement initiative led by Oxitec—male mosquitoes (which do not bite) are genetically modified to be sterile, and released to mate with females, resulting in no offspring, thereby reducing the Aedes aegypti mosquito population that spreads tropical diseases such as Zika. The claims were identified as "unproven" by the debunking website snopes.com.

== Chipotle food safety ==
In the context of mid-2010s concerns over food safety at Chipotle Mexican Grill certain commentators have implied that the outbreaks of food-borne illnesses were sabotage carried out by the biotech industry in retaliation over Chipotle's removal of GMOs from their menu. The claims were identified as "unproven" by the debunking website Snopes.

== Alpha-gal syndrome ==
In 2023, a false conspiracy theory connecting tick-borne alpha-gal syndrome (an acquired allergy to red meat) to Gates Foundation tick research was spread on social media.

== Ethical criticism ==
In Scholars & Rogues, an online progressive political journal, David Lambert, a development program officer for the United Nations, compared the conspiracy theories supported by some in the anti-GMO movement to those supported in the anti-vaccination movement,

Like preventable childhood diseases, malnutrition is another great moral failing of our time. GMOs such as golden rice—rice modified to contain high levels of beta carotene in order to compensate for the vitamin A deficiency which kills hundreds of thousands of children around the world and blinds many more every year—and drought resistant crops, which will become increasingly vital in the global south due to climate change, have vast potential to help those who don't shop at Whole Foods. But real progress has been stymied by the paranoid and misinformed, who clamor that GMOs, which are biologically no different than "natural" foods, are somehow poisonous. Behind it all is of course an evil corporation: Monsanto.

Offering a similar critique Kavin Senapathy, a freelance writer and speaker who offers editorials from the perspective of the skeptical movement, wrote for Forbes that

Both [the anti-vaccine and anti-GMO movements] cite cherry-picked, discredited, and retracted scientific studies, such as the 1998 Andrew Wakefield study linking the MMR vaccine with autism, and the 2012 Gilles-Éric Séralini rat study linking genetically engineered crops with cancer, while ignoring the vast bodies of evidence against them....

And both lead to injustice....It may seem that surely the anti-GMO movement is benign albeit wrong, innocuous compared to anti-vaccine atrocities. It may appear that it all boils down to some harmless non-GMO labels on grocery items. But it turns out there is a human cost.

The same movement that drives marketers to source non-GMO ingredients also influences regulatory bodies around the world. Crops are kept from regions in Africa where drought is a major contributor to the complex causes of malnutrition, with researchers in Tanzania forced to burn test fields of drought-tolerant corn rather than feed starving local children. Disease-resistant crops languish due to ideological regulations, with bananas resistant to xanthomonas wilt—which is threatening food security in Uganda and eastern Africa where it's a staple crop—kept from farmers and people who need them....

Philosopher Giovanni Tagliabue argued that promoters of GMO conspiracy theories were being taken advantage of by anti-environmental corporate interests, and "fails to hit [their] supposed target":

This ideological and political anti-corporate worldview, although sometimes almost paranoid, is legitimate. Yet, while I do not argue whether this attitude is good or bad, right or wrong, I maintain that the avowed anti-industrial struggle in the field of green biotechnologies not only fails to hit the supposed target, but benefits and supports a part of the industry whose products have a stronger environmental impact than rDNA cultivars; in addition, and more importantly, opposing GMOs generates heavy collateral damage to public science, agricultural progress and the poor.

== See also ==
- Brainwashing
- Big Pharma conspiracy theory
- Genetically modified food controversies
