= Furtive fallacy =

Informal fallacy of emphasis

The furtive fallacy is an informal fallacy of emphasis in which historical outcomes are asserted to be the result of hidden (furtive) misconduct or wrongdoing by decision makers. Historian David Hackett Fischer identified it as the belief that significant facts of history are necessarily sinister, and that "history itself is a story of causes mostly insidious and results mostly invidious." It may entail a conspiracy theory, but the essence of the fallacy is a belief in secret misdeeds, whether individual or conspiratorial, lurking behind every page of history. In its extreme form, the fallacy amounts to general paranoia.

Fischer identified several examples of the fallacy, with particular attention to the works of Charles A. Beard and his critic Forrest McDonald. Beard had argued that Franklin Roosevelt secretly and intentionally maneuvered the country into World War II. Although some critics accused him of falsifying the historical record, Fischer believed that Beard was merely pursuing a long-held misconception about how history occurs. McDonald, meanwhile, offered sensational descriptions of the early United States in which history unfolded through episodes of corruption and drunkenness.

Richard Hofstadter discussed the fallacy before Fischer, although not by name. In reviewing histories from the Progressive Era, Hofstadter noted that the progressive historians tended to assume that reality was always hidden and ignored, being determined by bribes, rebates, and secret business deals.

Although Fischer is generally credited with introducing the term, it appeared earlier in an anonymous 1893 critique of Sabine Baring-Gould's The Tragedy of the Caesars. The critic faulted Baring-Gould for arguing, in effect, that the political historians of the early Roman Empire were serial fabricators, and that the imperial court intrigues they described (such as the poisoning of Britannicus) had not occurred. The usage was, then, inverted from Fischer's: Baring-Gould argued that well-attested scoundrels were secretly benign. Fischer himself acknowledged this kind of inversion, which asserts that the truth of history is not more than what evidence shows, but less.

A modification of the furtive fallacy holds that when the historical record provides no evidence explaining a particular set of events, this is itself evidence of a furtive cause.

The idea of the furtive fallacy was criticized by Jeffrey M. Bale, author of the book The Darkest Sides of Politics, who cited the risk of historians underestimating the influence of political secret societies, vanguard parties, and intelligence agencies.

== See also ==
- Hermeneutics of suspicion
