= Canadian Digestive Health Foundation =

Canadian charity

The Canadian Digestive Health Foundation (French: Fondation Canadienne de la Santé Digestive) or CDHF, is a registered Canadian charity. The organization was founded in 1993 as the Canadian Digestive Disease Foundation and renamed the Canadian Digestive Health Foundation in 2001. The objectives of the Foundation are to educate the general public about digestive disease and nutrition, and to advance the science of gastroenterology by funding medical research. In February 2001, it was officially endorsed as the Foundation for the Canadian Association of Gastroenterology. Since then it has raised and invested more than $1 million to fund Canadian researchers in the field of digestive health.
