= Philosophy of conspiracy theories =

Branch of academic study

Philosophy of conspiracy theories is the academic study by philosophers of the phenomenon and history of conspiracy theories. A conspiracy theory has been defined as an explanation for an event or situation that invokes a conspiracy by sinister and powerful groups, often political in motivation, or more narrowly a conspiracy where other explanations are more probable. The term has a negative connotation, implying that the appeal to a conspiracy is based on prejudice or insufficient evidence.

== History ==
The debate in analytic philosophy regarding conspiracy theories began in the mid-1990s when Charles Pigden challenged Karl Popper's position. Popper, an influential philosopher of science, described what he called the "conspiracy theory of society", according to which history is a product of conspiracy, intended by some individuals or groups. Popper argues that this view must be wrong because not everything is intended. Although Popper's critique has been and continues to be influential, Pigden has maintained that Popper's argument does not apply to most conspiracy theories, which do not posit complete control of events. Pigden also points out that when a conspiracy fails in some way, a theory about the conspiracy is still a conspiracy theory and may still play an explanatory role.

Brian Keeley's 1999 essay, "Of Conspiracy Theories", which originally appeared in The Journal of Philosophy, prompted a new phase in the debate. Keeley focused on a subset of conspiracy theories that he called "unwarranted conspiracy theories" (UCTs). According to David Coady, Keeley argued that several generalizations about conspiracy theories "suggest a prima facie case against belief in them" (Coady 2006, p. 6). Lee Basham takes a more sympathetic view, suggesting we should adopt an attitude of "studied agnosticism" (Coady 2006, p. 7). Steve Clarke argues that because conspiracy theories overestimate dispositional explanations an attitude of prima facie skepticism towards them is warranted.

In 2007, a special issue of Episteme: A Journal of Social Epistemology contained several more essays that continued the debate. Therein, Neil Levy, in "Radically Socialized Knowledge", argues that conspiracy theories, conceived of as conflicting with officially endorsed accounts, "should be treated with prima facie scepticism" because they conflict with the views of the relevant epistemic authorities. Charles Pigden frames the issue in terms of the "ethics of belief". He argues that the conventional wisdom about conspiracy theories—that they "should neither be believed nor investigated"—is dangerously mistaken on any of a variety of interpretations of the phrase "conspiracy theory". More recently, philosophers and social scientists engaged in arguing over the nature of conspiracy theories and pejorative implications over policies and funding, to the extent this debate has been classified as a "cross-disciplinary disagreement".

== Pejorative implications ==
Philosophers M Dentith and Brian Keeley have argued that defining conspiracy theories as being prima facie unlikely may result in prematurely dismissing theories that posit conspiracies. Dentith, Keeley, and Basham favor minimalist definitions, defining "conspiracy theories" as theories involving conspiracies as a significant cause. This has been criticized by Coady as capturing too many false positives, including, for example, the official account of 9/11. Coady has suggested that a characteristic feature of conspiracy theories is their opposition to some official account.

The term "conspiracy theory" typically implies oppressive or sinister intent. The following philosophers have argued that such language overstates the case:

- Steve Clark (who argues that a dismissive attitude to conspiracy theories is generally justifiable) points out that Elvis Presley conspiring to fake his own death would not have been an example of nefarious intent, and that popularizers of that conspiracy theory have portrayed Elvis sympathetically.
- Daniel Cohnitz argues that in most versions of the Paul is dead conspiracy theory, the surviving Beatles and their co-conspirators had the non-malevolent motivation of trying to save the world from collective grief, and that some believers in chemtrails say they might be spreading chemicals for a beneficial purpose. Consequently, for Cohnitz, sinister intent should not be taken as a necessary component of the definition.
- Pigden characterizes conspiracy theories as positing "morally suspect" enterprises.

Susan Feldman has pointed out that beliefs designated as conspiracy theories may purport to explain, not events that have occurred or facts that are widely known, but "hidden facts".

Coady suggests that the phrase "conspiracy theory" should not be used, while Dentith and Keeley maintain that it should continue to be used and to be discussed.

== See also ==
- Conspiracy
- Conspiracy theory
- Conscious parallelism
