= Proportionality bias =

Assumption that big events have big causes

The proportionality bias, also known as major event/major cause heuristic, is the tendency to assume that big events have big causes. It is a type of cognitive bias and plays an important role in people's tendency to accept conspiracy theories. Academic psychologist Rob Brotherton summarises it as "When something big happens, we tend to assume that something big must have caused it".

== Underlying mechanisms ==
It has been suggested that proportionality bias is a cognitive response to the natural human tendency to search for patterns (Leman, 2007), as well as a proclivity to seek out causality. Human beings intake data from the outside world at an extremely high rate, resulting in the development of schema (cognitive frameworks that aid us in interpreting and organising information), which aid quick information processing and judgement making. This is to account for the limited nature of the cognitive load (the amount of information that working memory can hold at one time)(Sweller, 2010). By equating the magnitude of events and causes, strain on cognitive load reduces as a result of a decrease in mental processing required. Our intuition follows the notion that things should be balanced, maintaining a sense of order and logic. Such a notion satisfies key psychological motives, such as a need for certainty, control, and understanding.

This bias may be affected by an innate desire to be self-determining (Heider, 1958), resulting in a reluctance towards accepting our lack of agency in many everyday situations. This bias can be associated with the rejection of the notion of ultimate powerlessness to affect events, instead opting to highlight agency and control, as ultimately, if events and causes can be understood systematically and patterns can be identified, an individual may have more ability to alter future events. Often human nature depicts the 'balancing' of cause-effect relationships by overweighting the cause, or by dismissing or diminishing the effect.

In reality, randomness plays a bigger role in the events of our lives than we would like to admit. This rejection of 'the science of probability' is the very thing that makes us so susceptible to cognitive biases such as probability bias.

== Conspiracy theories ==
Proportionality bias has been heavily linked to the development and persistence of conspiracy theories – a direct behavioural example of the balancing of cause-effect relationships, such as through the belief that a major event was actually caused by a 'higher power'. For example, many believe that Princess Diana died as the result of conspiracy within the government and British Royal Family, arguably due to the fact that the death of such a prominent public figure being caused by something so seemingly mundane as a car crash is an uncomfortable truth to accept.

Leman and Cinirella's (2007) study saw 64 participants read 1 of 4 variations of a vignette reporting, in which the assassination of a theoretical president was either attempted or successful – participants later rate the likelihood that 8 related statements were accurate. It was found that individuals were more likely to endorse a conspiracy when the consequences of an event were major (and the president dies). Such findings support the notion that conspiracy theories are an effect of proportionality bias.

== Cultural differences ==
Further research has suggested that susceptibility to probability bias is not consistent, but rather it is affected by cultural norms and practices (Spina et al., 2010). In general, the prevalence of probability bias in Western cultures has been heavily documented. Shultz and Ravinsky (1977) demonstrated that Canadian school children attributed a loud noise to a heavy lever rather than a delicate one, suggesting that the tendency to balance cause and effect develops at a young age. More support comes from Ebel-Lam et al. (2008). Canadian participants read a scenario depicting either a high-magnitude or moderate-magnitude effect following a plane fault. Participants estimated the likelihood of each respective magnitude for the causes, and were seen to match magnitude of events and causes.

However, these studies only provide research support for cultures similar to that of Canada. In contrast, Asian folk wisdom states that 'one tiny insect may be enough to destroy a nation'. Such an aphorism is representative of a key difference in reasoning between cultures – East Asian cultures have been suggested to reason more holistically, versus North America's typically analytical reasoning (Nisbett et al., 2001). Furthermore, research suggests that East Asians attend to situational factors or context more than North Americans do. Masuda and Nisbett's (2001) study saw American and Japanese participants engage in photo and object recall tests. When asked to recall objects from an underwater scene, Americans were more likely to describe a focal element, such as a large fish in the centre, whereas the Japanese participants mentioned more contextual elements, such as seaweed, first. Even more strikingly, Japanese participants' ability to recall focal objects from the scene was impaired when the background was altered, whereas it had little to no effect on American participant recall, suggesting distinct cultural variation in terms of attentional processes and reasoning. Morris and Peng's (1994) study has further suggested that Americans tend to make more dispositional attributions (inferring that an event is due to personal factors), whereas Asian cultures show a proclivity for favouring situational attributions (context-based).

In general, Eastern cultures may have more complex causal theories, and consider a larger breadth of causal factors than Western cultures (Choi et al., 2003). Choi's 10-item measure of holistic tendency found Koreans to be more holistic. The existence of such cultural variation serves as support for the underlying mechanisms that cause proportionality bias – schemas are developed based on information from external stimuli and life experiences, meaning cultural variance highlights the impact of different environments on mental frameworks, and subsequently proportionality bias.

== Practical implications ==
The mechanisms related to proportionality bias effect behaviour in the everyday – a common example is the excessive shaking of dice in one's hands before rolling, as if the extra expenditure of effort will result in a better outcome. Similarly, the bias may seek to explain behaviour surrounding debt, which has increased by a power of 10 over the past 50 years in America – a lack of attention towards routine minor expenses in preference for major expenses may explain these statistics. In contrast, Eastern cultures may underestimate the importance of major health related behaviours, as they believe multiple minor ones will compensate (e.g. lung damage caused by smoking being combated by improving general health, rather than quitting smoking).

Research on probability bias is vital for combatting the negative impact it has the potential to cause, both independently and socially. Working with software, for example, may help train individuals out of the habit of magnitude matching, as when coding, syntax is central to a program, and one misplaced error may result in system malfunction. As global interconnectedness increases, understanding of this bias and its variance is hugely important, as this difference in underlying mechanisms, and subsequent behaviour, increases the possibility of misunderstanding and miscommunication, which may in turn lead to conflict.
