= Barkun =

Barkun is a surname. Notable people with this surname include:

- Alan Barkun, Canadian scientist
- Michael Barkun (born 1938), American academic
