= Analytic reasoning =

Ability to look at information and discern patterns

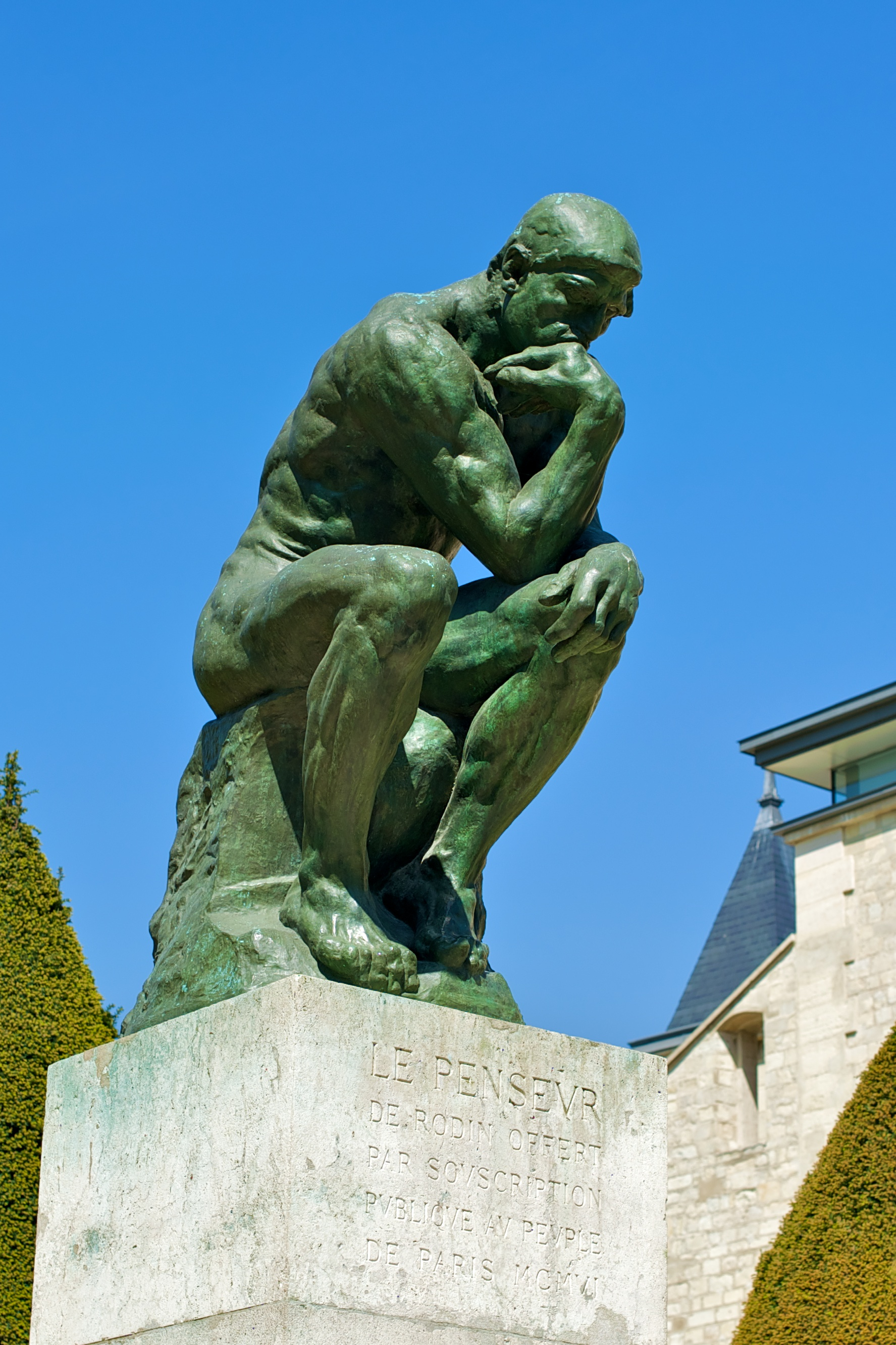
Le Penseur (The Thinker) by Auguste Rodin, Musée Rodin, Paris

Analytical reasoning, also known as analytical thinking, refers to the ability to look at information, be it qualitative or quantitative in nature, and discern patterns within the information. Analytical reasoning involves breaking down large problems into smaller components and using deductive reasoning with no specialised knowledge, such as: comprehending the basic structure of a set of relationships; recognizing logically equivalent statements; and inferring what could be true or must be true from given facts and rules. Analytical reasoning is axiomatic in that its truth is self-evident. In contrast, synthetic reasoning requires that we include empirical observations. The specific terms "analytic" and "synthetic" themselves were introduced by Kant (1781) at the beginning of his Critique of Pure Reason.

== Kant's usage ==
In the philosophy of Immanuel Kant, analytic reasoning represents judgments made upon statements that are based on the virtue of the statement's own content. No particular experience, beyond an understanding of the meanings of words used, is necessary for analytic reasoning.

For example, "John is a bachelor." is a given true statement. Through analytic reasoning, one can make the judgment that John is unmarried. One knows this to be true since the state of being unmarried is implied in the word bachelor; no particular experience of John is necessary to make this judgement.

To suggest that John is married—given that he is a bachelor—would be self-contradictory.

== Practical Uses ==
Business and finance employers look for people who can group elements of a task and reintroduce sections as a coherent singular component that can be more easily accomplished in order to move through a complete task little by little. Analytic reasoning is used by businesses to assess the patterns of change in their market, employees ideally being able to recognize this statistic through raw data. Basically, having good analytic reasoning is the ability to recognize trends and patterns after considering data.

As a result, some universities use the terms "analytical reasoning" and "analytical thinking" to market themselves. Radford University defines analytical thinking as "A person who can use logic and critical thinking to analyze a situation." Other campuses go deeper on the topic.

They may also correlate this with other future careers, such as:

- Philosophy
- Civics
- Natural science
- Social science
- Management

== See also ==
- Analytic-synthetic distinction
- Logic
- Critical thinking
- Lateral thinking
- Deductive reasoning
- Analytical skill
- Analysis
- Analysis paralysis
- Creative thinking
- Intuitive thinking
- Systems thinking
- Strategic thinking
