= Canadian Association of Gastroenterology =

- Location: Oakville, Ontario, Canada
- Website: www.cag-acg.org

The Canadian Association of Gastroenterology (CAG) was founded in 1962 to promote the study of the digestive tract in health and disease, including liver disease. The Association is built on broad principles and includes individuals of different disciplines (physicians, surgeons, paediatricians, radiologists, basic scientists). Today, the Association comprises more than 1,100 members. CAG members are actively involved in research, education and patient care in all areas of digestive health and disease, contributing to the economic and social health of all Canadians. The Canadian Digestive Health Foundation is the foundation of the CAG.

== Journal of the Canadian Association of Gastroenterology ==
Journal of the Canadian Association of Gastroenterology
- Language: English
- Edited by: Eric Benchimol

Publication details
- History: 2017-present
- Publisher: Oxford University Press
- Frequency: Continuous
- Open access: Yes
- License: CC BY
- Impact factor: 3.8 (2025)

Standard abbreviations
- ISO 4: J. Can. Assoc. Gastroenterol.

Indexing
- ISSN: 2515-2092 (print); 2515-2092 (web)
- OCLC no.: 1117652342

Links
- Journal homepage

The Journal of the Canadian Association of Gastroenterology is a peer-reviewed medical journal dealing with topics in gastroenterology and in liver disease. It was established in 2018 as the official journal of the Canadian Association of Gastroenterology. The journal is published by Oxford University Press. The editor-in-chief is Eric Benchimol (University of Toronto). According to the Journal Citation Reports, the journal has a 2025 impact factor of 3.8.
