= Dupax del Norte =

Municipality in Nueva Vizcaya, Philippines

- Municipality
- Municipality of Dupax del Norte
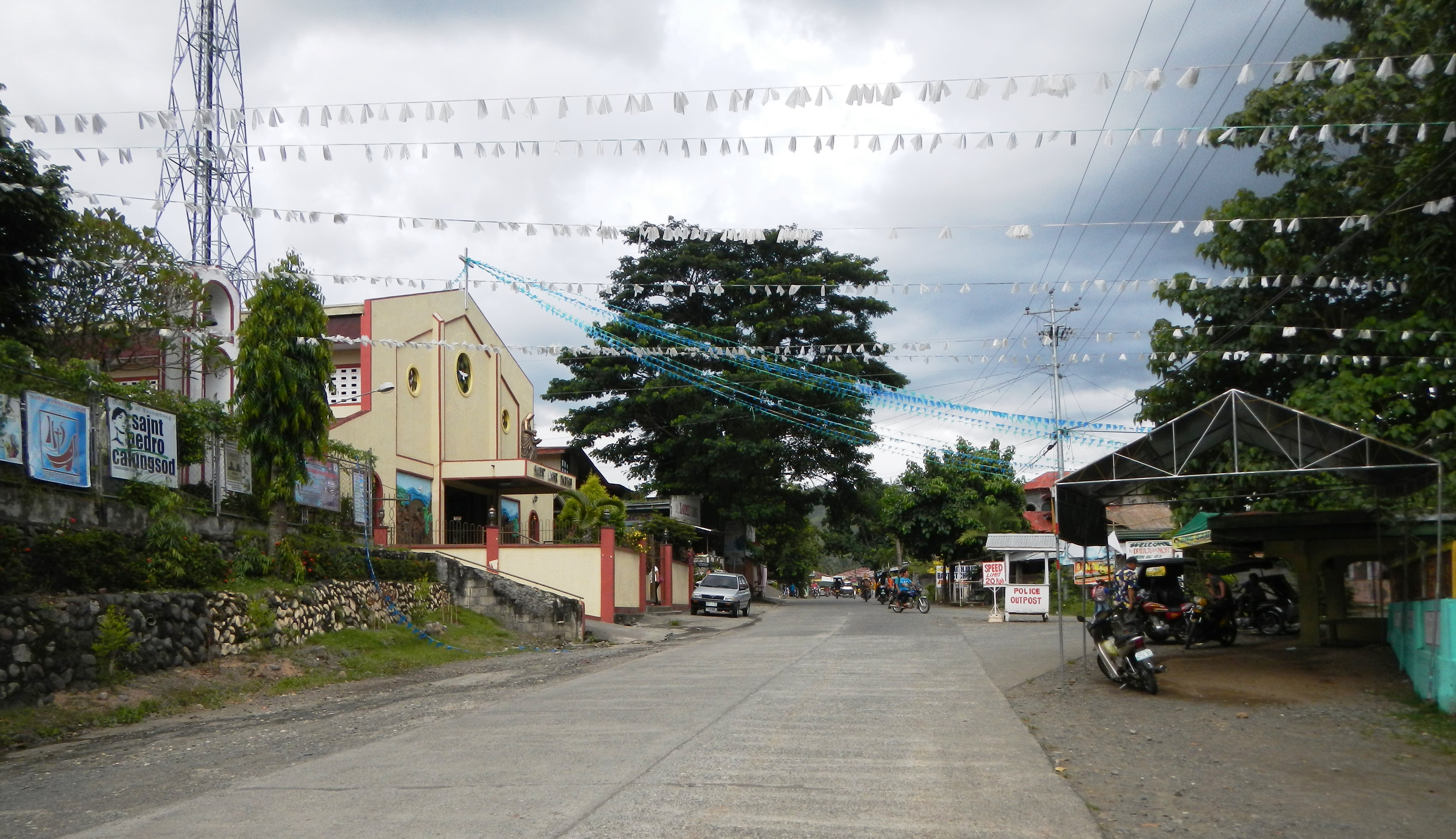
- Downtown area

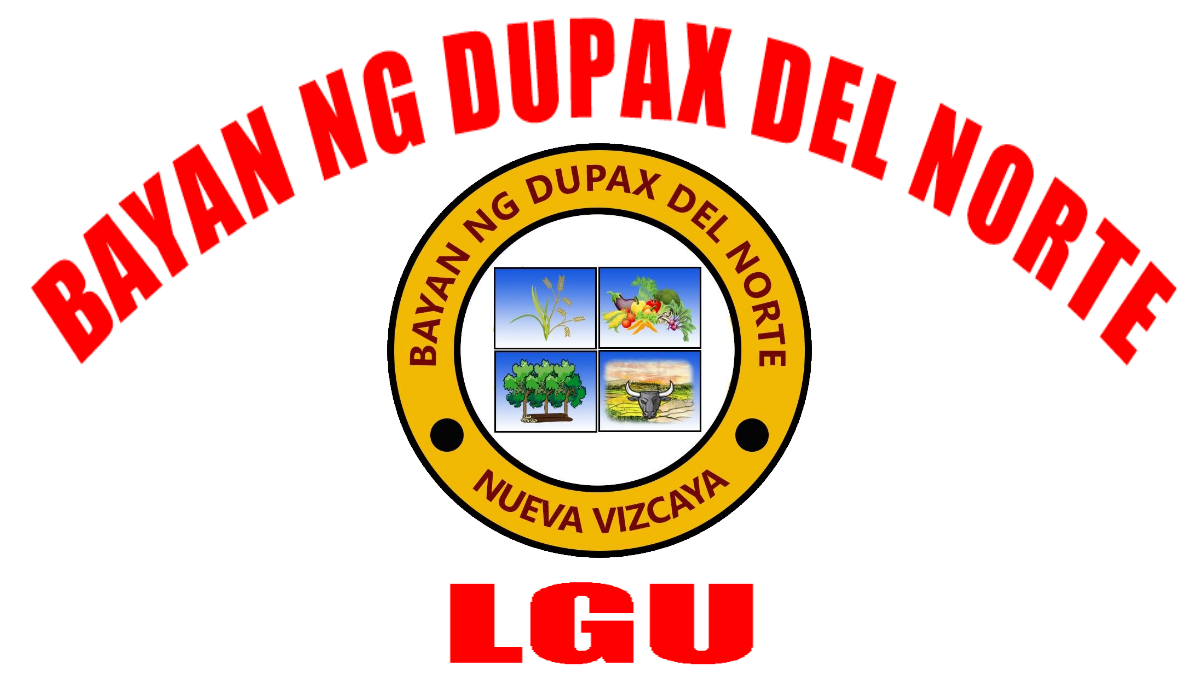
- Flag Seal

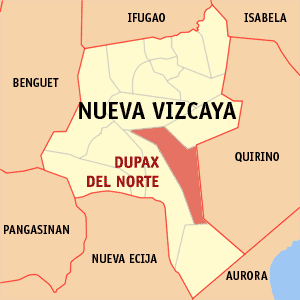
- Map of Nueva Vizcaya with Dupax del Norte highlighted
- Interactive map of Dupax del Norte
- Location within the Philippines
- Coordinates: 16°18′27″N 121°06′07″E
- Country: Philippines
- Region: Cagayan Valley
- Province: Nueva Vizcaya
- District: Lone district
- Barangays: 15 (see Barangays)

Government
  - Type: Sangguniang Bayan
  - Mayor: Juan Paolo E. Cayton
  - Vice Mayor: Ric Ronelson "RR" D. Asuncion
  - Representative: Luisa L. Cuaresma
  - Electorate: 18,629 voters (2025)

Area
  - Total: 347.30 km^{2} (134.09 sq mi)
- Elevation: 413 m (1,355 ft)
- Highest elevation: 723 m (2,372 ft)
- Lowest elevation: 339 m (1,112 ft)

Population (2024 census)
  - Total: 35,509
  - Density: 102.24/km^{2} (264.81/sq mi)
  - Households: 8,860

Economy
  - Income class: 1st municipal income class
  - Poverty incidence: 9.1% (2023)
  - Revenue: ₱ 229 million (2024)
  - Assets: ₱ 530 million (2024)
  - Expenditure: ₱ 196.7 million (2024)
  - Liabilities: ₱ 47.98 million (2024)

Service provider
  - Electricity: Nueva Vizcaya Electric Cooperative (NUVELCO)
- Time zone: UTC+8 (PST)
- ZIP code: 3706
- PSGC: 0205007000
- IDD : area code: +63 (0)78
- Native languages: Gaddang; Ilocano; Tagalog
- Website: dupaxdelnorte.gov.ph

Dupax del Norte, officially the Municipality of Dupax del Norte (Gaddang: Ili na Dupax del Norte; Ilocano: Ili ti Dupax del Norte; Tagalog: Bayan ng Hilagang Dupax), is a municipality in the province of Nueva Vizcaya, Philippines. According to the 2024 census, it has a population of 35,509 people.

== Etymology ==
The origin of the name Dupax stems from the Isinay term "dopaj," denoting "to recline in utter relaxation and repose", expressing the desire of the locals to unwind fully after refurbishing their camp, enjoying their harvest, and concluding their forest hunts before returning home.

Prior to the establishment of Dupax, the site of what would be its town proper served as a camp for hunters from surrounding tribal settlements.

The area, either a plain or a valley, was located near their hunting grounds, and became their settlement as the town of Dopaj. The name later changed into Dupax when the Spaniards, upon their arrival, substituted letter "j" for "x" for convenience.

== History ==
The town of Dupax was first discovered by Luis Pérez Dasmariñas in 1591. Eighteen years later, the mission was established by the Dominicans but was later abandoned due to territorial disputes with the Franciscans.

Colonization seemed difficult for decades. In 1717, Fr. Alejandro Cacho came on mission to Dupax and established Christian communities. On April 22, 1731, Dupax was founded as an urban settlement by the Augustinian missionaries, Fr. Nicolas Norbantes and Fr. Agustin San Juan.

In the early 18th century, Dupax was inhabited by three tribes - the Malaats from Ituy, said to be the ancestors of the Isinays, the town's first inhabitants, occupied an area known as Parai. The other two were the Caraos and the Bugcalots.

During the 1818 Spanish census, Dupax had 867 native families living in harmony with 6 Spanish-Filipino families.

As early as 1928, during the term of Municipal President Inocencio Suzon, there were attempts to transfer the town hall to Barrio Malasin (poblacion of the present Dupax del Norte) from the poblacion (the present poblacion of Dupax del Sur). On November 28, 1931, during the incumbency of Municipal President Tranquilino Orden, the Municipal Council has approved Resolution No. 94 sponsored by Councilor Victoriano Barroga proposing the transfer of the seat of the municipal government from the old poblacion to Malasin. Congressman Leonardo B. Perez sponsored a bill on that matter. By virtue of Republic Act (RA) No. 1181 approved on June 20, 1954, the seat of government was transferred from old poblacion to Barrio Malasin, whose location is not only strategic but is beside the town's commercial center.

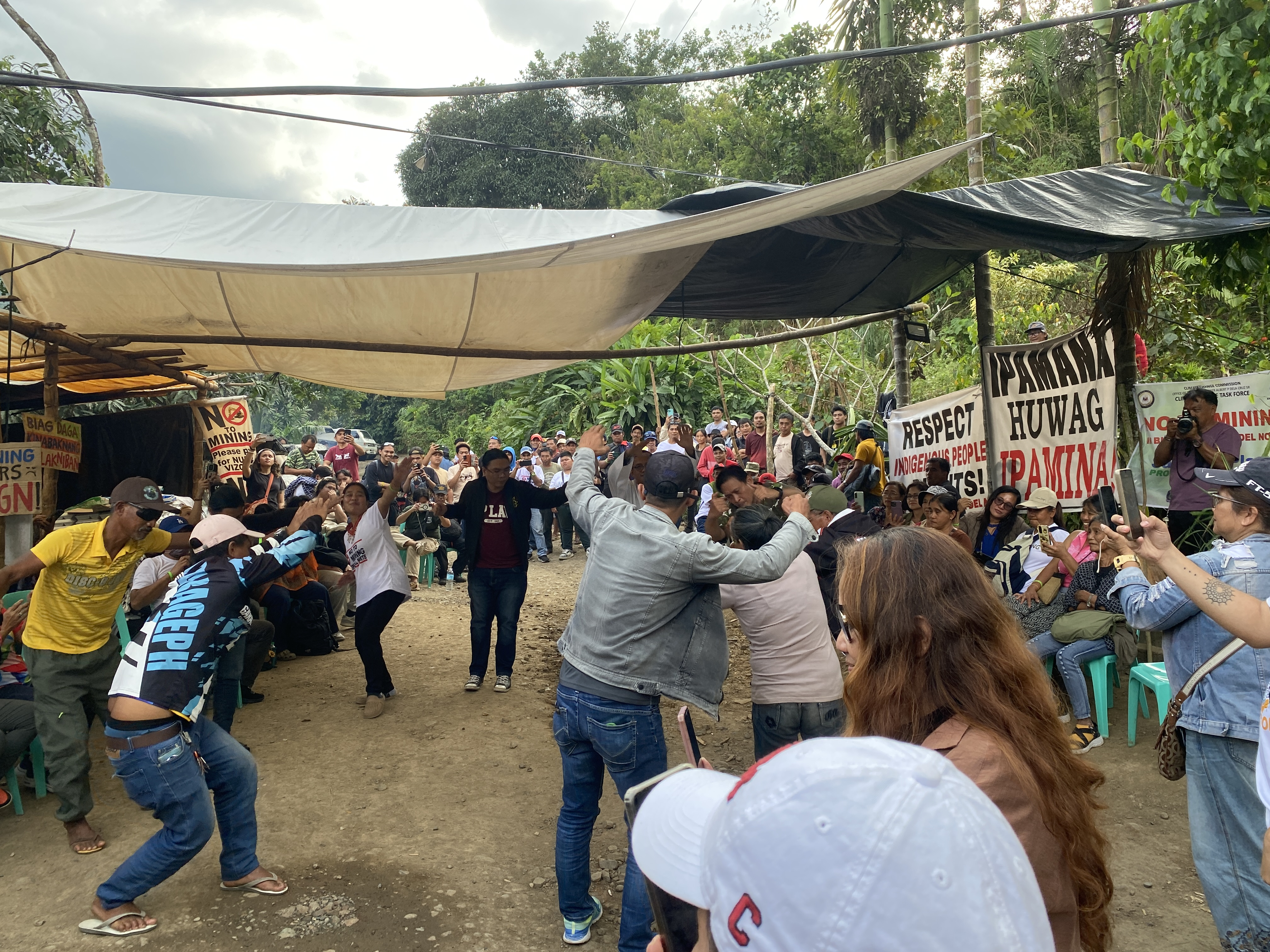
Dupax del Norte anti-mining protest where protesters dance indigenous Igorot dance called tayaw at the barricade.

Dupax then was the largest municipality in Nueva Vizcaya in terms of land area prior to division into three separate ones. RA No. 6372, sponsored by Representative Benjamin Perez and Senator Leonardo Perez, was approved on August 16, 1971, dividing Dupax into two new municipalities: Dupax del Norte, which would consist the poblacion of Malasin, designated as the seat of government, eight barrios and sixteen sitios; and Dupax del Sur. As the creation of the latter was later ratified in a plebiscite, the division was only implemented through Presidential Decree No. 586 promulgated by President Ferdinand Marcos on November 20, 1974.

In 1979, through Batas Pambansa Blg. 27 approved by Marcos, four barangays and a sitio in the municipality, along with parts of Dupax del Sur, were separated to constitute into a municipality, Alfonso Castañeda.

In 2025, the town became the subject of a mining exploration permit given to Woggle Corporation. This sparked a series of protests and blockades by residents in the town, who opposed another mine in the area.

== Geography ==
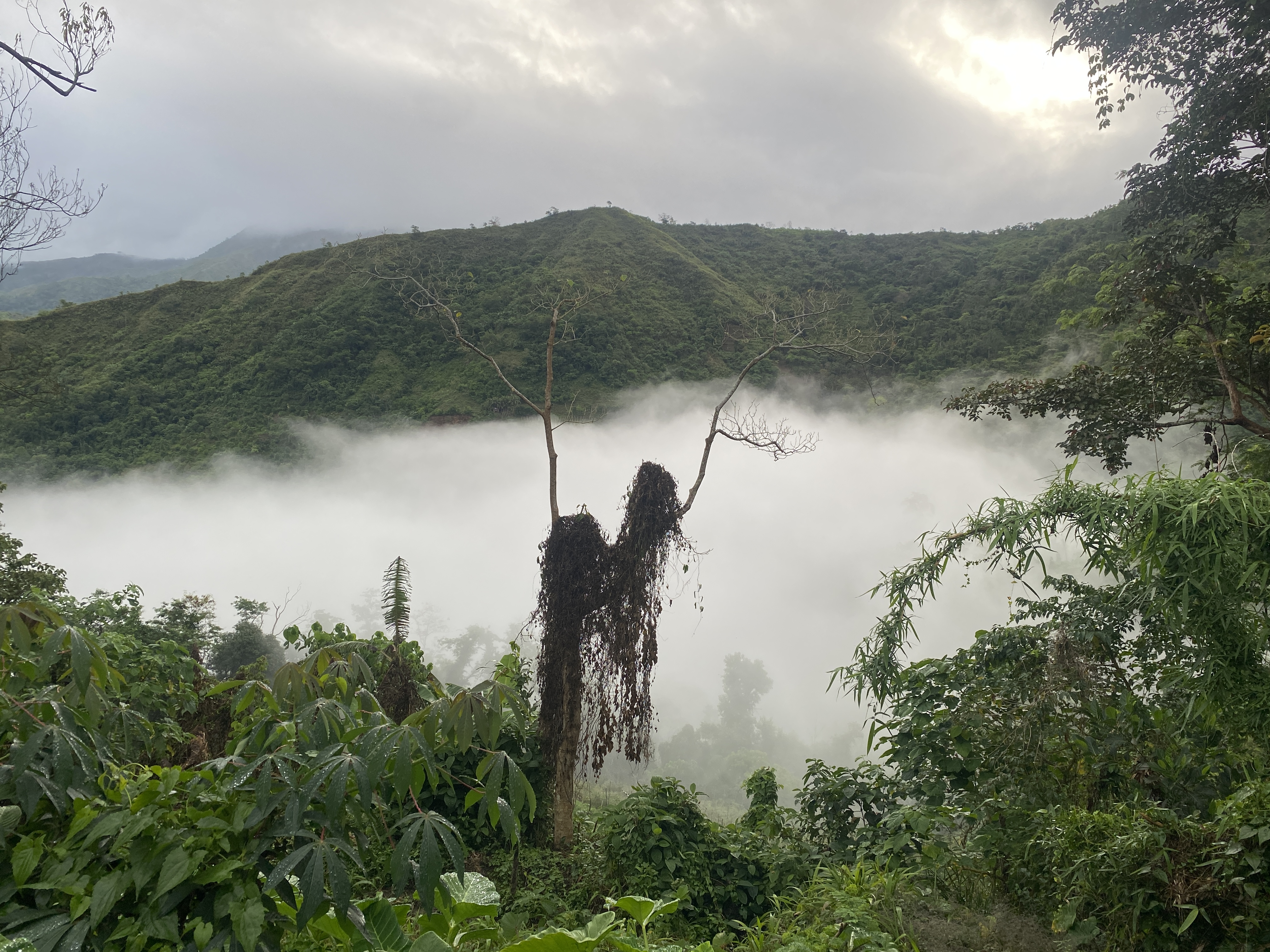
Mountains of Dupax del Norte

The Municipality of Dupax del Norte is situated on the south-eastern part of Nueva Vizcaya. It is bounded by Kasibu in the north, Alfonso Castañeda in the east, Dupax del Sur in the south, and Bambang in the west. It has wide tracts of virgin forests, rich, fertile plains and valleys with mineral deposits and has a climate suitable for agriculture.

Dupax del Norte is situated 25.82 kilometres (16.04 mi) from the provincial capital Bayombong, and 275.64 kilometres (171.27 mi) from the country's capital city of Manila.

=== Barangays ===
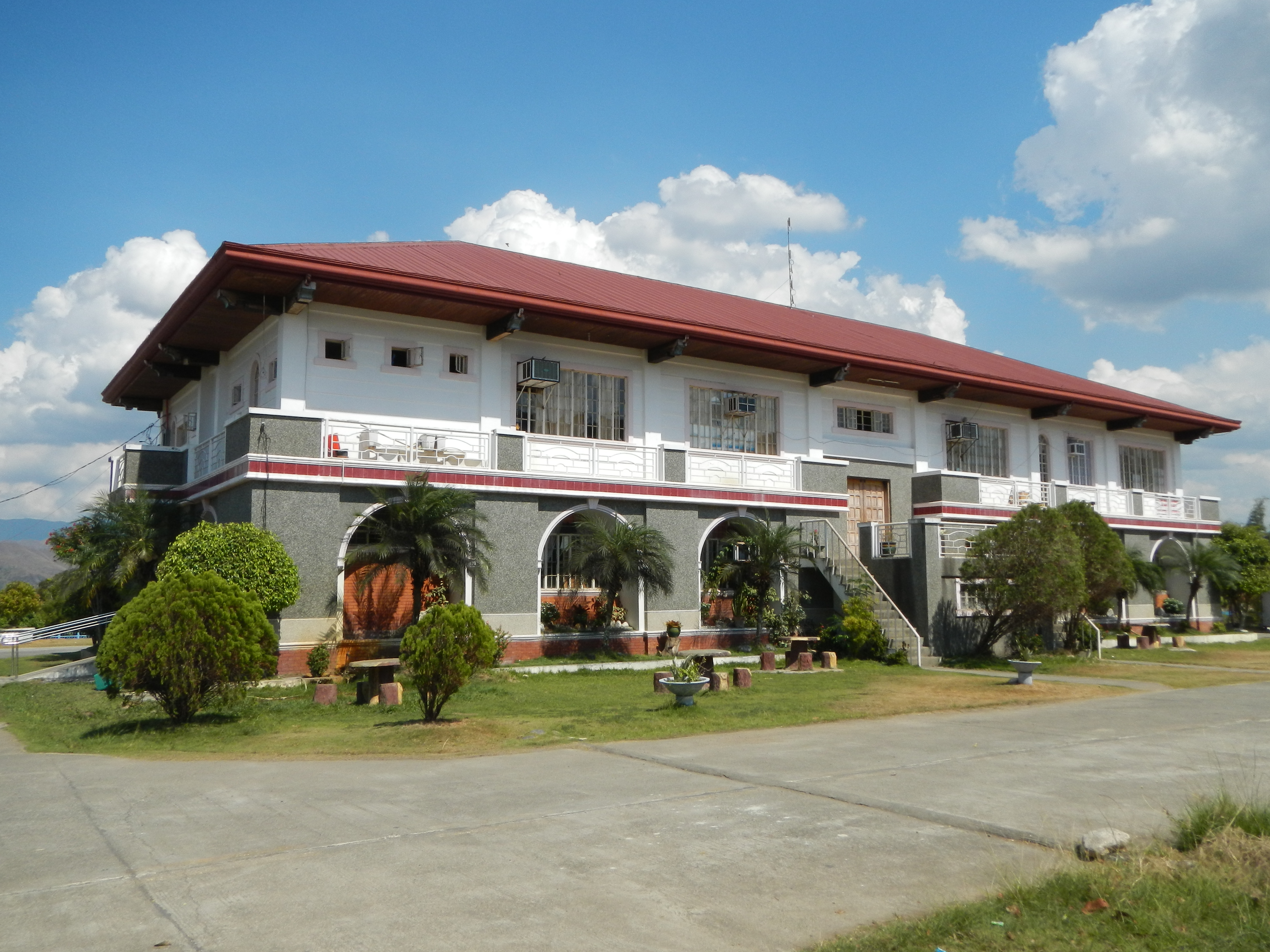
Municipal hall

Dupax del Norte is politically subdivided into 15 barangays. Each barangay consists of puroks and some have sitios.

- Belance
- Binuangan
- Bitnong
- Bulala
- Inaban
- Ineangan
- Lamo
- Mabasa
- Macabenga
- Malasin (Poblacion)
- Munguia
- New Gumiad
- Oyao
- Parai
- Yabbi

==== Mabasa ====
Mabasa (Iloko for "wet") is a barangay of Dupax del Norte. It was one of the oldest barrio of Dupax (when the town was not yet divided into two). Mabasa was originally called San Roque, named by the parish priest of Dupax after the saint of hunters because the place then was a thick forest where game was abundant such as deer and wild pigs.

The first settlers of San Roque were Ilokano migrants from the town of Paoay in Ilocos Norte and from Alcala and San Nicolas towns in Pangasinan. They travelled by foot and by horses and carabaos through San Nicolas, passing through Imugan, Santa Fe, Nueva Vizcaya. The migrants settled at Sitio Poonan (later called Puongan). The family of Apolonio Vadil was the first settler in Poungan. Old records from the Roman Catholic Church in Dupax del Sur showed that the daughter of Apolonio Vadil, Tomasa, was baptized on October 10, 1887.

More migrants came and settled along the Apean (Apayan) River from Puongan upstream and occupied the western part of the barrio now called Riverside East and Riverside West. The settlers found the place always flowing with abundant water coming from a spring in the eastern part of the barrio, and so they called the place "Nabasa" which means "wet" in Iloko language. It was later officially called "Mabasa" changing from the old name of "San Roque."

==== Inaban ====
The name came from the Iloko word Inabaan which means a place where there are plenty of gabi (taro) plants, locally known as “ABA”. In the early days, giant gabi plants with leaves as big as umbrellas thrived in the vicinity of this barangay.

A story goes that many years ago when the place was still thickly covered with flora and fauna, and was a favorite hunting ground, a hunter once hit a big male deer with his spear. However, the deer was not mortally wounded and it decided to attack the hunter. The man and the deer fought for about an hour but in the end, the man triumphed over the animal but the hunter was seriously wounded. Alone, he tried to find his way home. But then it began to rain, he sought shelter under the big leaves of the gabi plants. Unfortunately, the hunter died because of his wounds and days after, his remains were found under the gabi plants.

During World War II, American soldiers pronounced the word Inabaan into Inaban.

Inaban was formally created in 1963 as a barangay of Dupax (now Dupax del Norte) by virtue of Republic Act No. 3590.

=== Climate ===
Climate data for Dupax del Norte, Nueva Vizcaya
Month	Jan	Feb	Mar	Apr	May	Jun	Jul	Aug	Sep	Oct	Nov	Dec	Year
Mean daily maximum °C (°F)	27 (81)	28 (82)	29 (84)	31 (88)	30 (86)	29 (84)	28 (82)	28 (82)	28 (82)	29 (84)	28 (82)	27 (81)	29 (83)
Mean daily minimum °C (°F)	18 (64)	19 (66)	20 (68)	22 (72)	23 (73)	23 (73)	23 (73)	23 (73)	23 (73)	21 (70)	20 (68)	19 (66)	21 (70)
Average precipitation mm (inches)	21 (0.8)	28 (1.1)	34 (1.3)	58 (2.3)	160 (6.3)	179 (7.0)	226 (8.9)	225 (8.9)	215 (8.5)	168 (6.6)	59 (2.3)	32 (1.3)	1,405 (55.3)
Average rainy days	7.5	8.5	10.9	14.9	23.9	25.7	26.7	25.3	24.9	18.6	11.8	8.9	207.6
Source: Meteoblue

== Demographics ==
Population census of Dupax del Norte
Year	Pop.	±% p.a.
1975	14,818	—
1980	16,743	+2.47%
1990	20,904	+2.24%
1995	22,142	+1.08%
2000	23,196	+1.00%
2007	23,816	+0.36%
2010	25,697	+2.80%
2015	27,514	+1.31%
2020	33,295	+4.10%
2024	35,509	+1.56%
Source: Philippine Statistics Authority

In the 2020 census, Dupax del Norte had a population of 33,295. The population density was 96 inhabitants per square kilometre (250/sq mi).

== Economy ==
Poverty incidence of Dupax del Norte (%)

Source: Philippine Statistics Authority

== Government ==
=== Local government ===
Dupax del Norte is part of the lone congressional district of the province of Nueva Vizcaya. It is governed by a mayor, designated as its local chief executive, and by a municipal council as its legislative body in accordance with the Local Government Code. The mayor, vice mayor, and the municipal councilors are elected directly in polls held every three years.

=== Elected officials ===
Members of the Municipal Council (2025–2028)
Position	Name
Congressman	Tim Cayton
Mayor	Juan Paolo E. Cayton
Vice-Mayor	Ric Ronelson "RR" D. Asuncion
Councilors	Chris Ramos
Councilors	Jimmy Balisi
Councilors	Randolph Tominez
Councilors	Arnel A. Herrera
Councilors	Joey Oldico
Councilors	Agie Arsenio
Councilors	Penly Apasao
Councilors	Hussein Meneses

== Education ==
The Schools Division of Nueva Vizcaya governs the town's public education system. The division office is a field office of the DepEd in Cagayan Valley region. There are two schools district offices which governs all public and private elementary and high schools throughout the municipality. These are Dupax del Norte I Schools District Office, and Dupax del Norte II Schools District Office.

=== Primary and elementary schools ===
- Abatan Elementary School
- Belance Central School
- Belance Seventh Day Adventist Elementary School
- Binuangan Elementary School
- Bitnong Elementary School
- Bulala Elementary School
- Camella SNV School (Elementary)
- Casecnan Primary School
- Dupax del Norte Central School
- Giayan Elementary School
- Inaban Elementary School
- Ineangan Elementary School
- Ineangan Kiddie Learning Center
- Lamo Elementary School
- Lamo UMC Kiddie Learning Center
- Mabasa Elementary School
- Mabasa UMC Learning Center
- Macabenga Elementary School
- Mantatta Elementary School
- Munguia Elementary School
- Nagakay Elementary School
- Naruron Elementary School
- New Gumiad Elementary School
- Oyao Elementary School
- Parai Elementary School
- UMC Malasin Kiddie Learning Center
- Yabbi Elementary School

=== Secondary schools ===
- Belance Technical-Vocational School
- Binuangan Christian Academy
- Bugkalot High School
- Camella SNV School
- Dupax del Norte National High School
- Lamo National High School
- Munguia National High School

== Notable personalities ==
- Carlos Padilla (September 19, 1944 – May 5, 2023), a Filipino politician who serves as governor of Nueva Vizcaya from 2016 up until his death on 2023.
- Tim Cayton, incumbent Congressman of the lone district of Nueva Vizcaya

== Sister cities ==
- San Pedro, Laguna
