= Kayapa =

Municipality in Nueva Vizcaya, Philippines

- Municipality
- Municipality of Kayapa
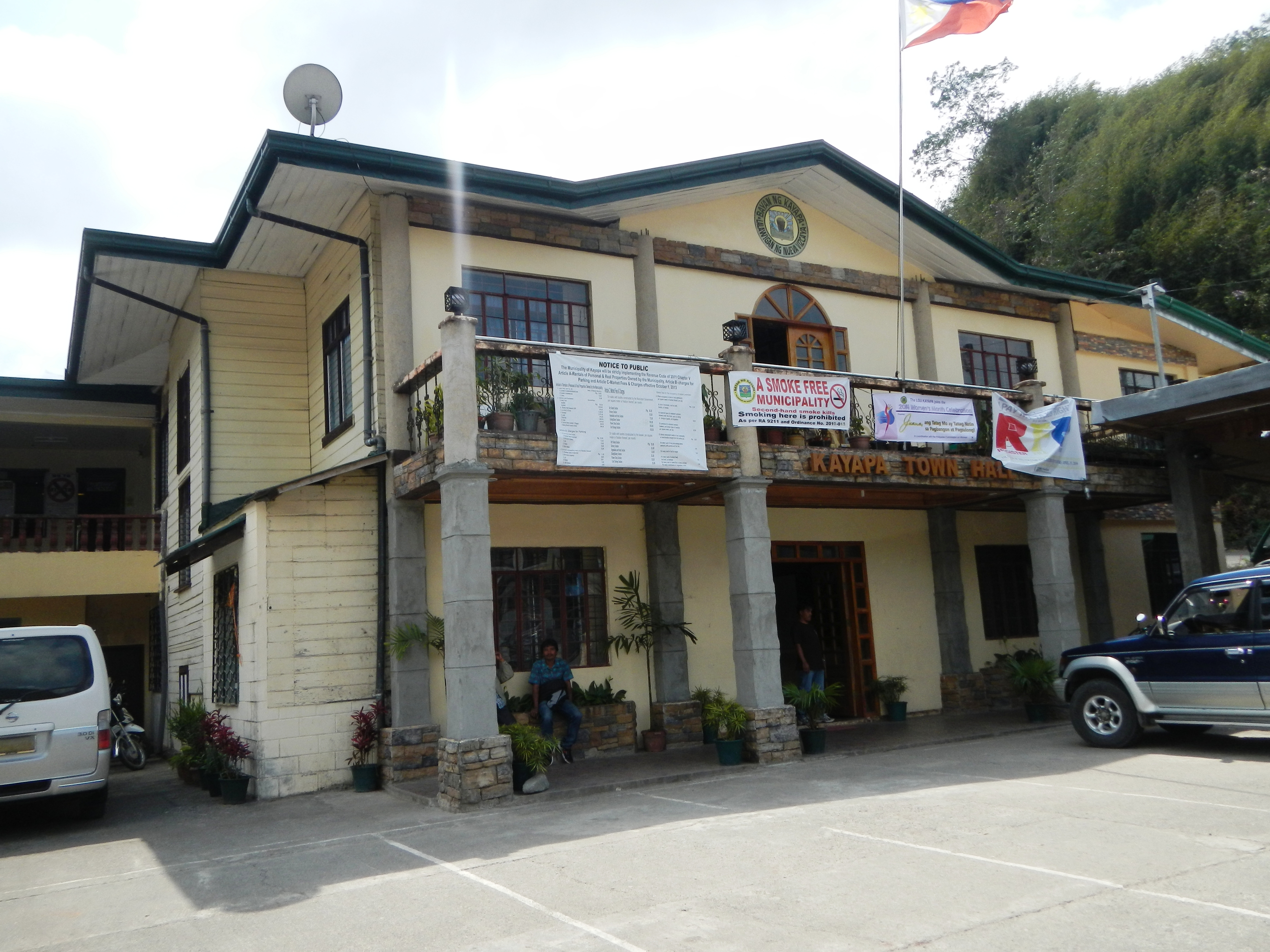
- Municipal hall

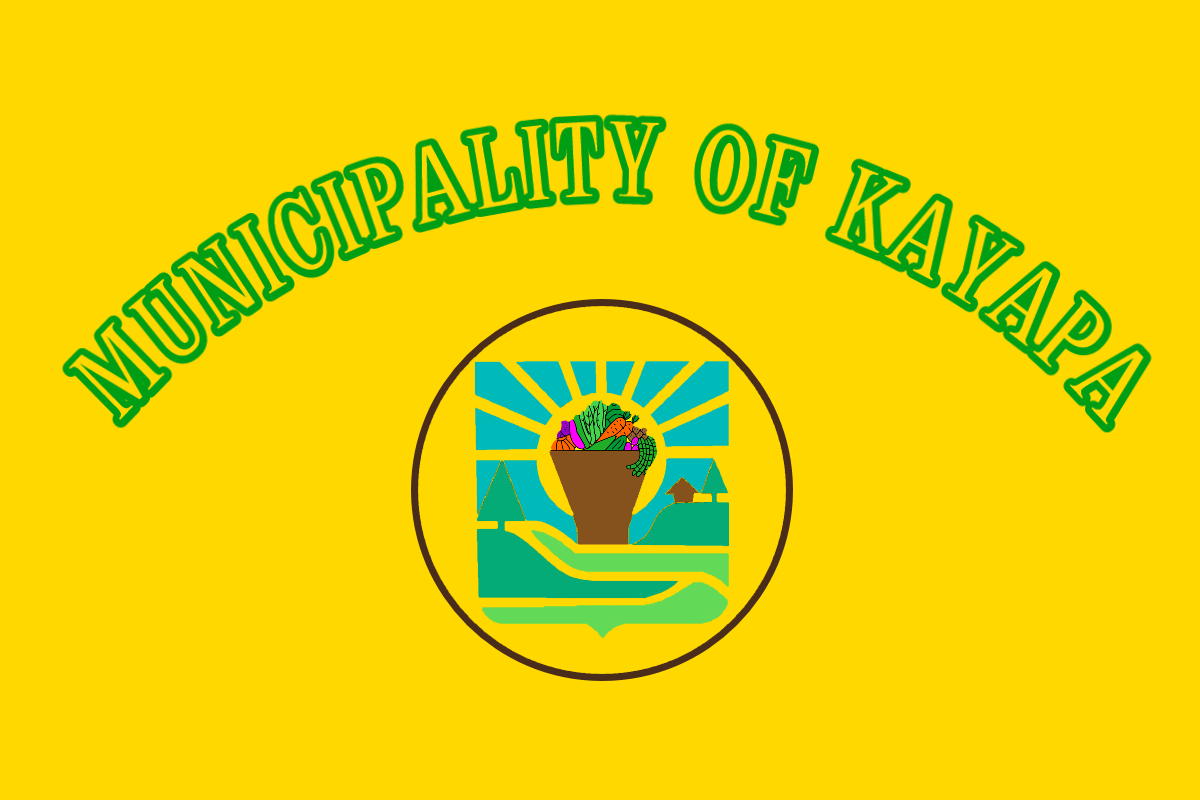
- Flag Seal
- Nicknames: Gateway to the Cordilleras; Summer Capital of Nueva Vizcaya
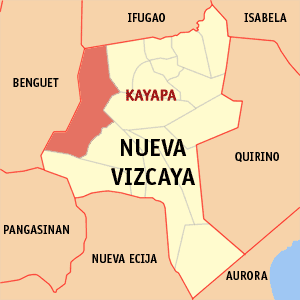
- Map of Nueva Vizcaya with Kayapa highlighted
- Interactive map of Kayapa
- Location within the Philippines
- Coordinates: 16°21′30″N 120°53′10″E
- Country: Philippines
- Region: Cagayan Valley
- Province: Nueva Vizcaya
- District: Lone district
- Barangays: 30 (see Barangays)

Government
  - Type: Sangguniang Bayan
  - Mayor: Elizabeth D. Balasya
  - Vice Mayor: Glenson Awas Dangis
  - Representative: Luisa L. Cuaresma
  - Electorate: 16,376 voters (2025)

Area
  - Total: 482.90 km^{2} (186.45 sq mi)
- Elevation: 1,264 m (4,147 ft)
- Highest elevation: 2,030 m (6,660 ft)
- Lowest elevation: 628 m (2,060 ft)

Population (2024 census)
  - Total: 27,865
  - Density: 57.703/km^{2} (149.45/sq mi)
  - Households: 6,130

Economy
  - Income class: 1st municipal income class
  - Poverty incidence: 11.5% (2023)
  - Revenue: ₱ 237.1 million (2024)
  - Assets: ₱ 749.3 million (2024)
  - Expenditure: ₱ 197.1 million (2024)
  - Liabilities: ₱ 104.7 million (2024)

Service provider
  - Electricity: Nueva Vizcaya Electric Cooperative (NUVELCO)
- Time zone: UTC+8 (PST)
- ZIP code: 3708
- PSGC: 0205010000
- IDD : area code: +63 (0)78
- Native languages: Ilocano; Gaddang; Ibaloi; I-Wak; Kallahan; Karaw; Tagalog

Kayapa, officially the Municipality of Kayapa (Gaddang: Ili na Kayapa; Ilocano: Ili ti Kayapa; Tagalog: Bayan ng Kayapa), is a municipality in the province of Nueva Vizcaya, Philippines. According to the 2024 census, it has a population of 27,865 people.

== Etymology ==
The name Kayapa is believed to have been derived from the words "Kalabao" (carabao) and "Yapa" (a local term), which were combined to form the town's present name. Prior to being called Kayapa, the area now comprising the town proper was originally known as Dangatan.

== History ==
Kayapa was founded in 1754 by the first Commandante Dovilla to spread the Christian faith and to establish a civil government to the non- Christian tribes. The municipal names was coined from a native tree “Kalabao” meaning orange and “Yapa” meaning a valley into Kayapa, by the Commandante, which was inhabited by the Alagots, second descendants of Bomangi and Owac, and the third descendants of Kalahan, Ibaloi, Ilo-o and Karao who settled in the fertile valley. For almost two centuries, Kayapa was a part of the province of Pangasinan and the Spanish Civil Government ran and controlled nearly all institutional establishments and several Rancherias. In the latter part of 1881, Kayapa became a part of Mountain province, now Benguet. A decree was proclaimed by the Governor General concentrating the Igorots under the rule of Spanish friars who ruled through tyranny, cruelty, hard labor and severe punishments that led those who resented flee to the mountains and joined the revolutionary forces under the leadership of General Emilio Aguinaldo, who fought back the Spaniards in the year 1900.

In the 1901-1904, Kayapa was part of Tayug, Pangasinan. On January 1, 1913, the municipality of Kayapa again became a part of Benguet, Mountain province by virtue of the Executive Order No. 9. Then on January 23, 1915, Governor General Francis Burton Harrison signed EO No. 9 that the territory of the former Commandancia of Kayapa, except that which lies within the Benguet watershed of Agno River be transferred to the province of Nueva Vizcaya.

After liberation, Kayapa was divided into two municipalities: municipality of Pingkian and Kayapa. However, on December 5, 1950, an election took place and Castillo M. Tidang, Sr., was elected mayor whose term the municipality of Pingkian was merged with the municipality of Kayapa, thereby making Kayapa a municipality as it is today.

== Geography ==
Kayapa is situated 53.97 kilometres (33.54 mi) from the provincial capital Bayombong, and 293.10 kilometres (182.12 mi) from the country's capital city of Manila.

=== Barangays ===
Kayapa is politically subdivided into 30 barangays. Each barangay consists of puroks and some have sitios.

- Acacia
- Amelong Labeng
- Ansipsip
- Baan
- Babadi
- Balangabang
- Banao
- Binalian
- Besong
- Cabalatan Alang
- Cabanglasan
- Kayapa Proper East
- Kayapa Proper West
- Mapayao
- Nansiakan
- Pampang (Poblacion)
- Pangawan
- Pinayag
- Pingkian
- San Fabian
- Talicabcab
- Tubungan
- Alang Salacsac
- Balete
- Buyasyas
- Cabayo
- Castillo Village
- Latbang
- Lawigan
- Tidang Village

=== Climate ===
Climate data for Kayapa, Nueva Vizcaya
Month	Jan	Feb	Mar	Apr	May	Jun	Jul	Aug	Sep	Oct	Nov	Dec	Year
Mean daily maximum °C (°F)	22 (72)	23 (73)	24 (75)	26 (79)	25 (77)	24 (75)	23 (73)	23 (73)	23 (73)	24 (75)	25 (77)	22 (72)	24 (75)
Mean daily minimum °C (°F)	13 (55)	14 (57)	15 (59)	17 (63)	18 (64)	18 (64)	18 (64)	18 (64)	18 (64)	16 (61)	15 (59)	14 (57)	16 (61)
Average precipitation mm (inches)	21 (0.8)	28 (1.1)	34 (1.3)	58 (2.3)	160 (6.3)	179 (7.0)	226 (8.9)	225 (8.9)	215 (8.5)	168 (6.6)	59 (2.3)	32 (1.3)	1,405 (55.3)
Average rainy days	7.5	8.5	10.9	14.9	23.9	25.7	26.7	25.3	24.9	18.6	11.8	8.9	207.6
Source: Meteoblue

== Demographics ==
Population census of Kayapa

Year	Pop.	±% p.a.
1918	7,577	—
1939	8,702	+0.66%
1948	5,759	−4.48%
1960	9,298	+4.07%
1970	14,920	+4.84%
1975	20,718	+6.81%
1980	20,491	−0.22%
1990	18,685	−0.92%

Year	Pop.	±% p.a.
1995	19,376	+0.68%
2000	19,193	−0.20%
2007	20,806	+1.12%
2010	21,453	+1.12%
2015	23,714	+1.93%
2020	26,469	+2.34%
2024	27,865	+1.24%

Source: Philippine Statistics Authority

== Economy ==
Poverty incidence of Kayapa (%)

Source: Philippine Statistics Authority

== Government ==
=== Local government ===
Kayapa is part of the lone congressional district of the province of Nueva Vizcaya. It is governed by a mayor, designated as its local chief executive, and by a municipal council as its legislative body in accordance with the Local Government Code. The mayor, vice mayor, and the municipal councilors are elected directly in polls held every three years.

=== Elected officials ===
Members of the Municipal Council (2019–2022)
Position	Name
Congressman	Atty. Timothy Joseph E. Cayton
Mayor	Elizabeth D. Balasya MD, MPH
Vice-Mayor	Glenson Awas Dangis
Councilors	Adriano Awas Dodon
Councilors	Pacito Pilde Cadame
Councilors	Romeo Martinez Camlas Jr.
Councilors	Wesly Liborio Kitano
Councilors	Valdez Anuma Duntogan
Councilors	Oscar Balaswit Campoy
Councilors	Tony Basilio Pagnas
Councilors	Esteban Abluyan Baccac

== Education ==
The Schools Division of Nueva Vizcaya governs the town's public education system. The division office is a field office of the DepEd in Cagayan Valley region. There are two schools district offices which govern all public and private elementary and high schools throughout the municipality. These are East Kayapa Schools District Office, and West Kayapa Schools District Office.

=== Primary and elementary schools ===
- Abat Elementary School
- Acacia Primary School
- Ansipsip Elementary School
- Baan Elementary School
- Babadi Elementary School
- Babadi Elementary School - Annex
- Balangabang Elementary School
- Ban-et Elementary School
- Banao Elementary School
- Besong Elementary School
- Binalian Elementary School
- Bulo-Galsa Primary School
- Buyasyas Primary School
- Cabanglasan Elementary School
- Cabayo Elementary School
- Cabayo Integrated School (Elementary)
- Caritas Village Elementary School
- Castillo Village Elementary School
- Dayap Elementary School
- Dempeg Elementary School
- Kapangan Primary School
- Kayapa Central School
- Kayapa Proper Elementary School
- Kayapa Proper Elementary School Annex
- Labeng Primary School
- Latbang Elementary School
- Latbang Elementary School-Annex
- Lawigan Elementary School
- Luclocos Elementary School
- Macdu Elementary School
- Mapayao Elementary School
- Nansiakan Elementary School
- Napo-Tuyak Elementary School
- Oliweg Elementary School
- Pangawan Elementary School
- Pingkian Central School
- San Fabian Elementary School
- Talicabcab Elementary School
- Talmoy Primary School
- Tidang Village Elementary School
- Tubongan Elementary School
- Tuppan Elementary School

=== Secondary schools ===
- Cabayo Integrated School
- Kayapa High School
- Martinez Cuyangan National High School
- Nansiakan National High School
- Pinayag National High School
- Sta. Cruz Pingkian High School

== Gallery ==
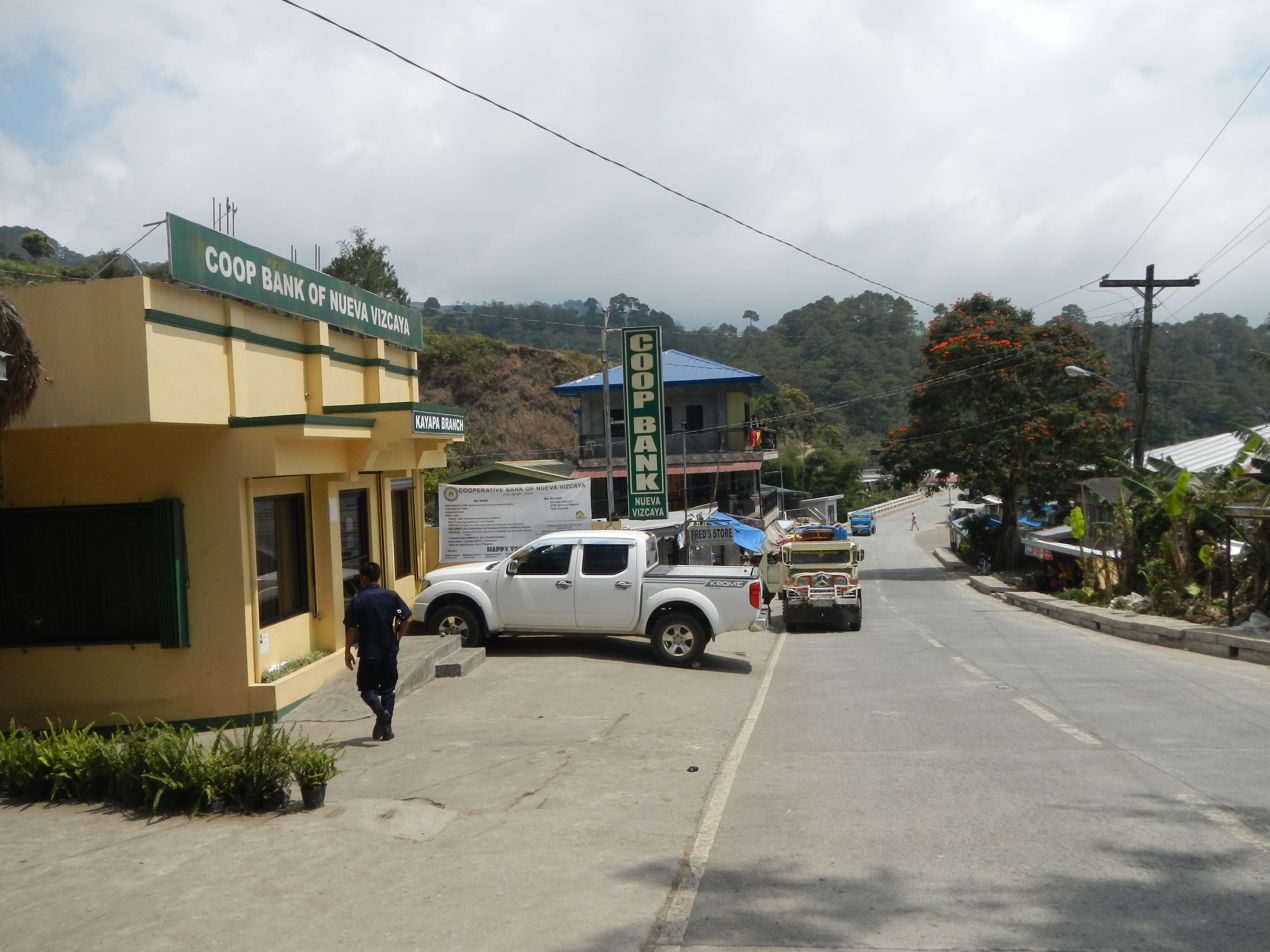
Downtown area

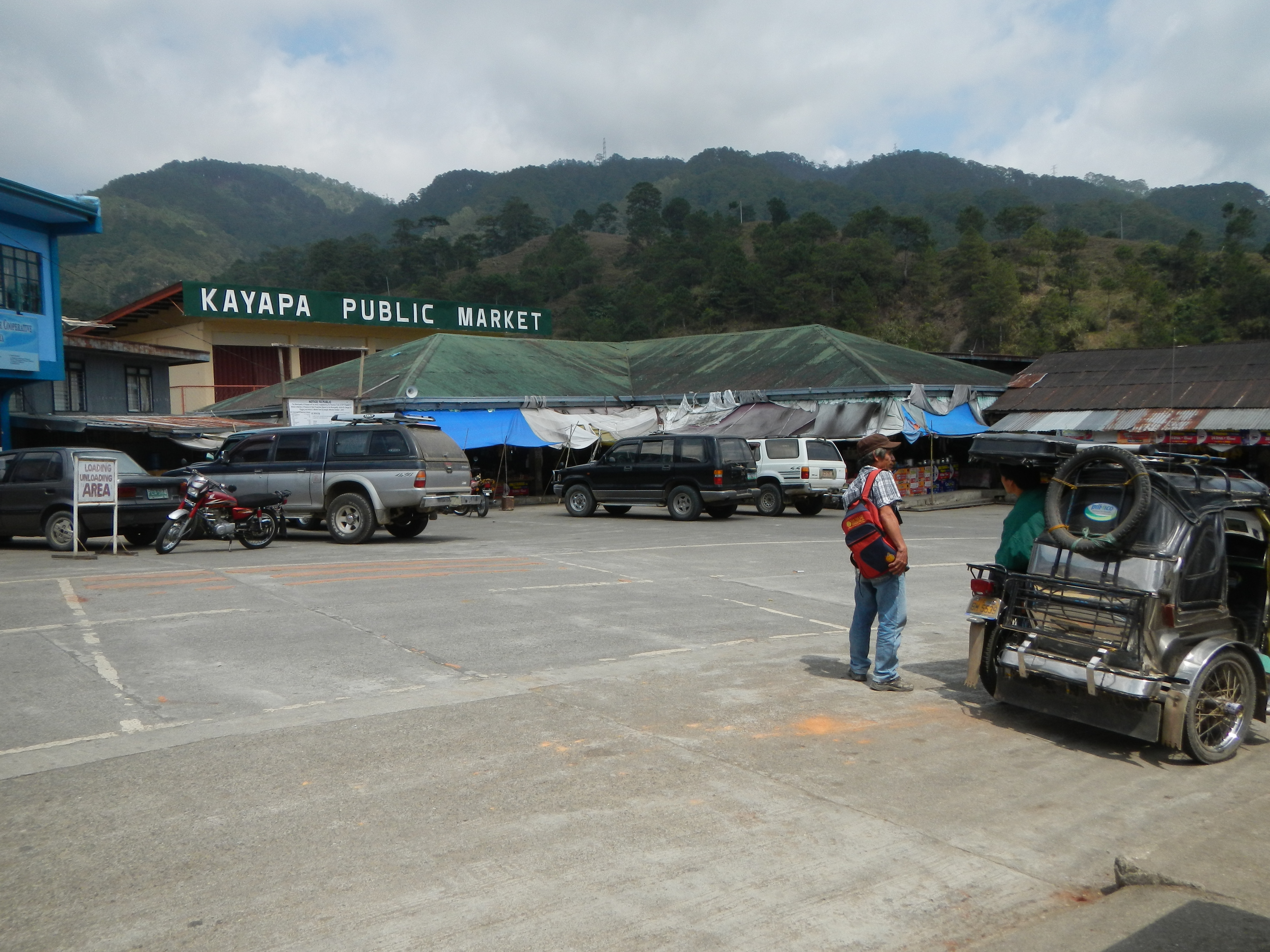
Public market

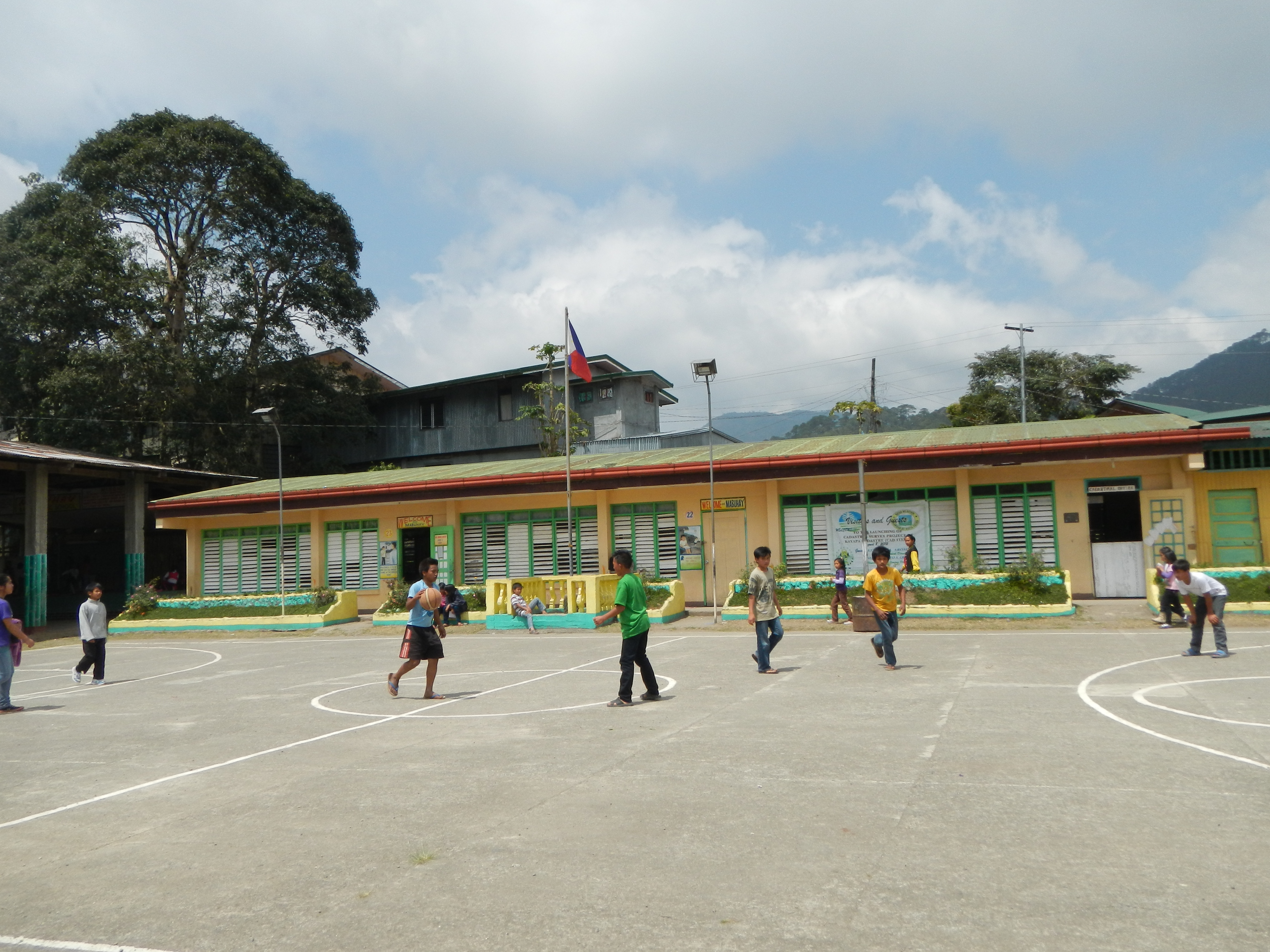
Kayapa Central School

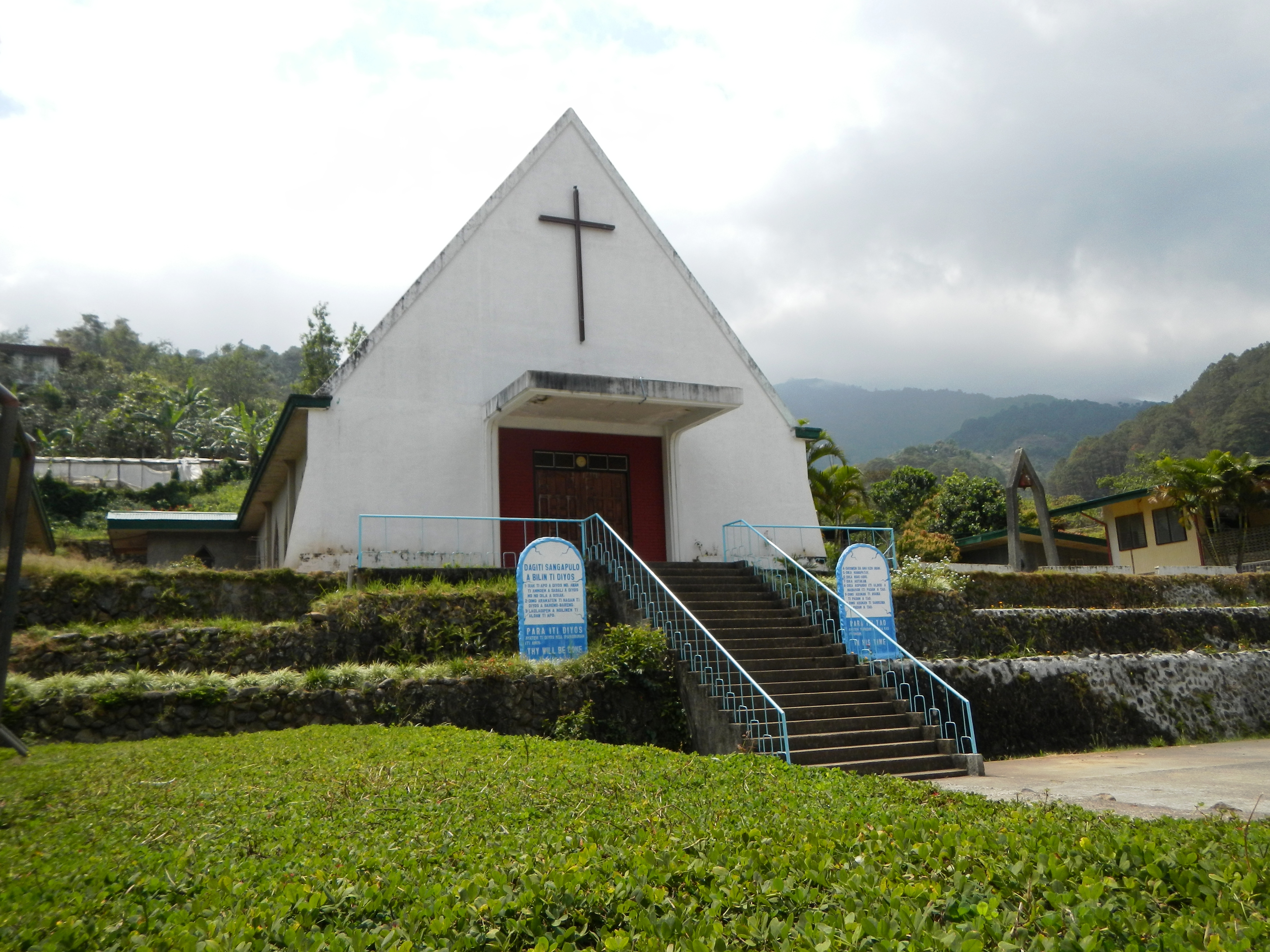
Saint Joseph Parish Church

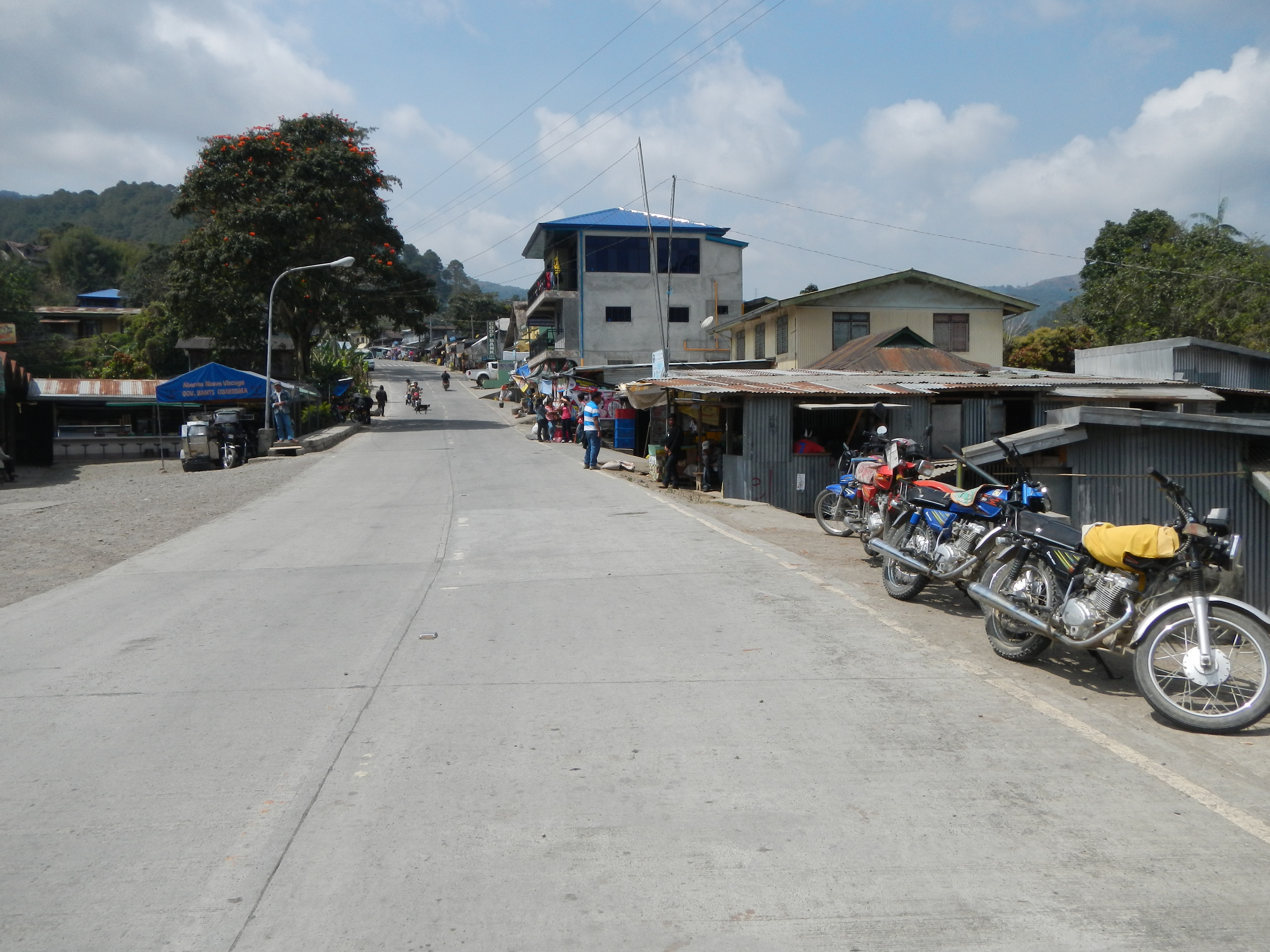
Town proper

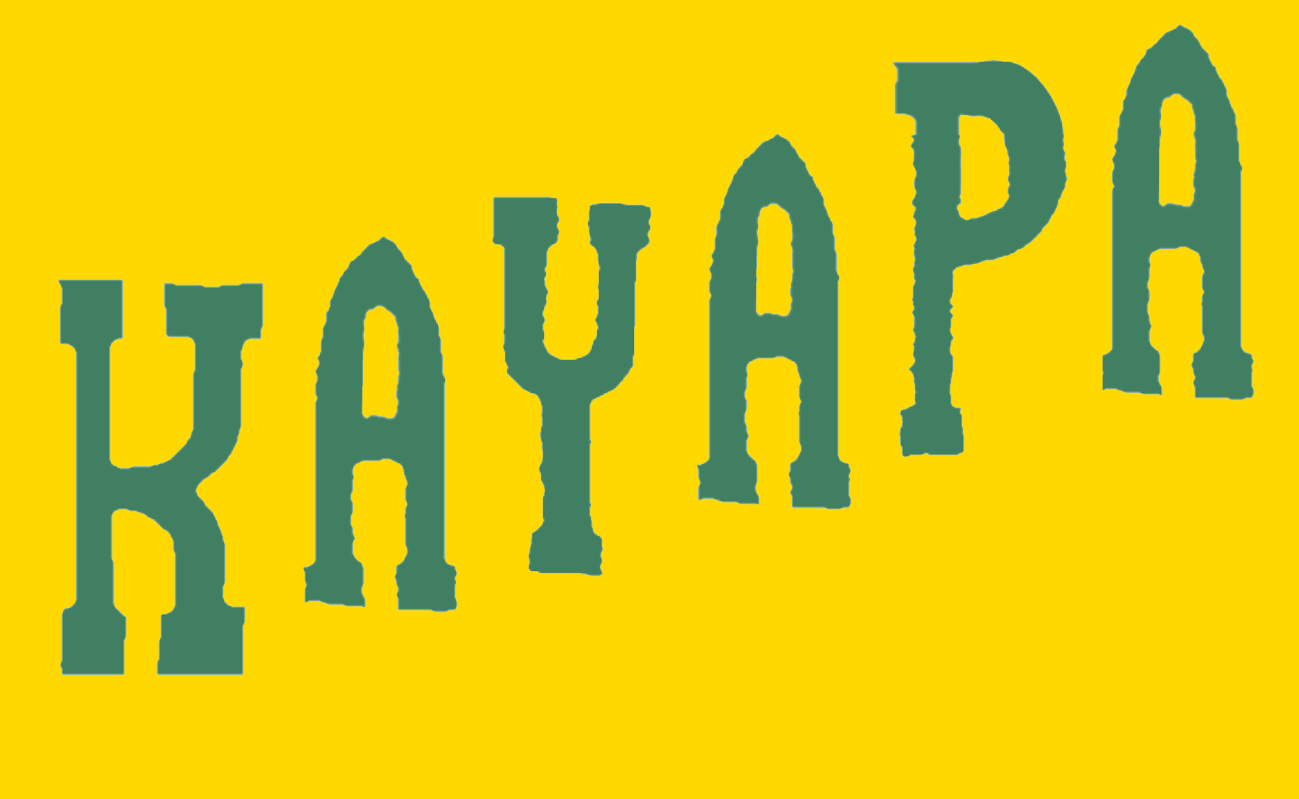
Variant of flag used at parades
