= Dupax del Sur =

Municipality in Nueva Vizcaya, Philippines

- Municipality
- Municipality of Dupax del Sur
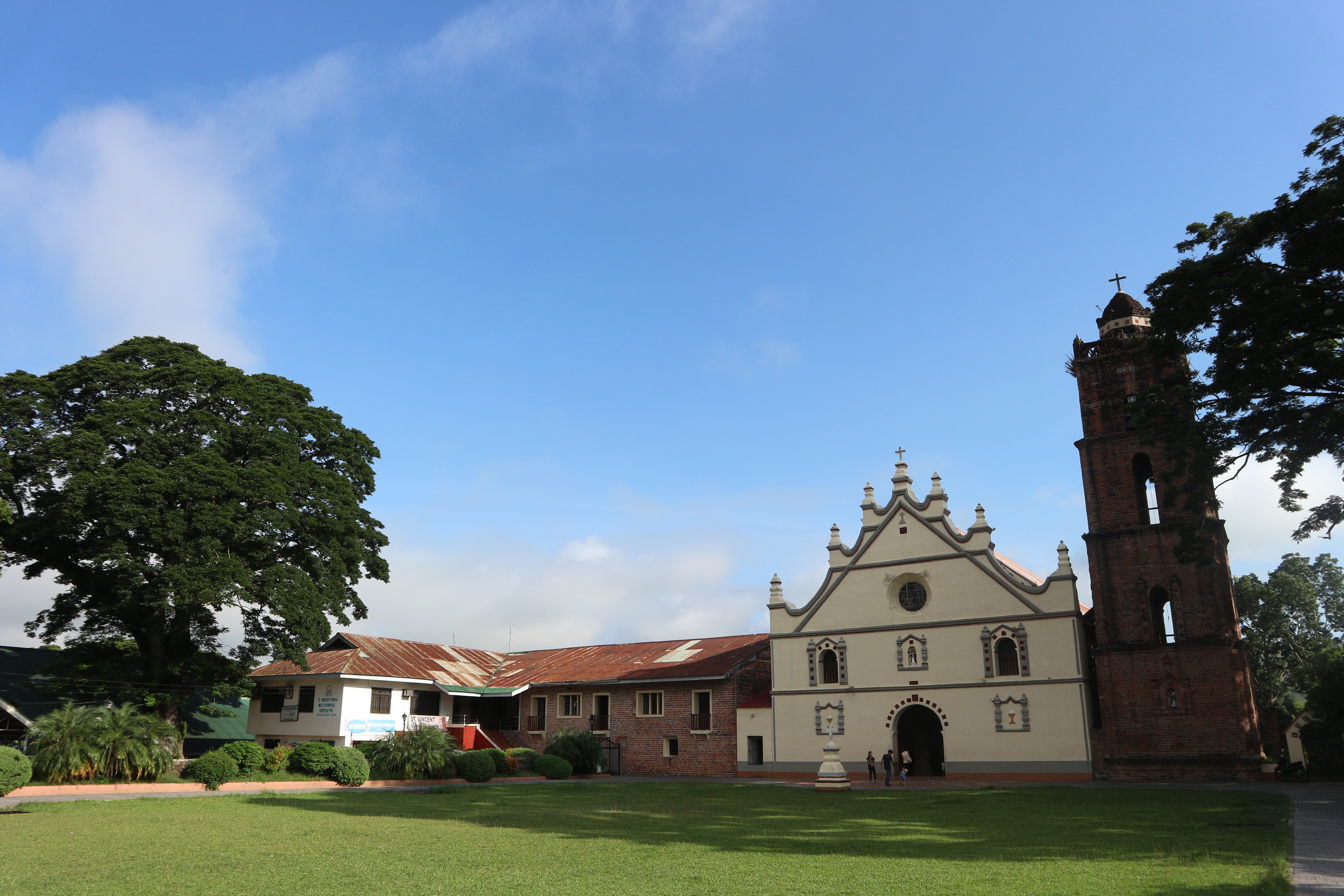
- Facade of the San Vicente Ferrer Church, a declared National Cultural Treasure

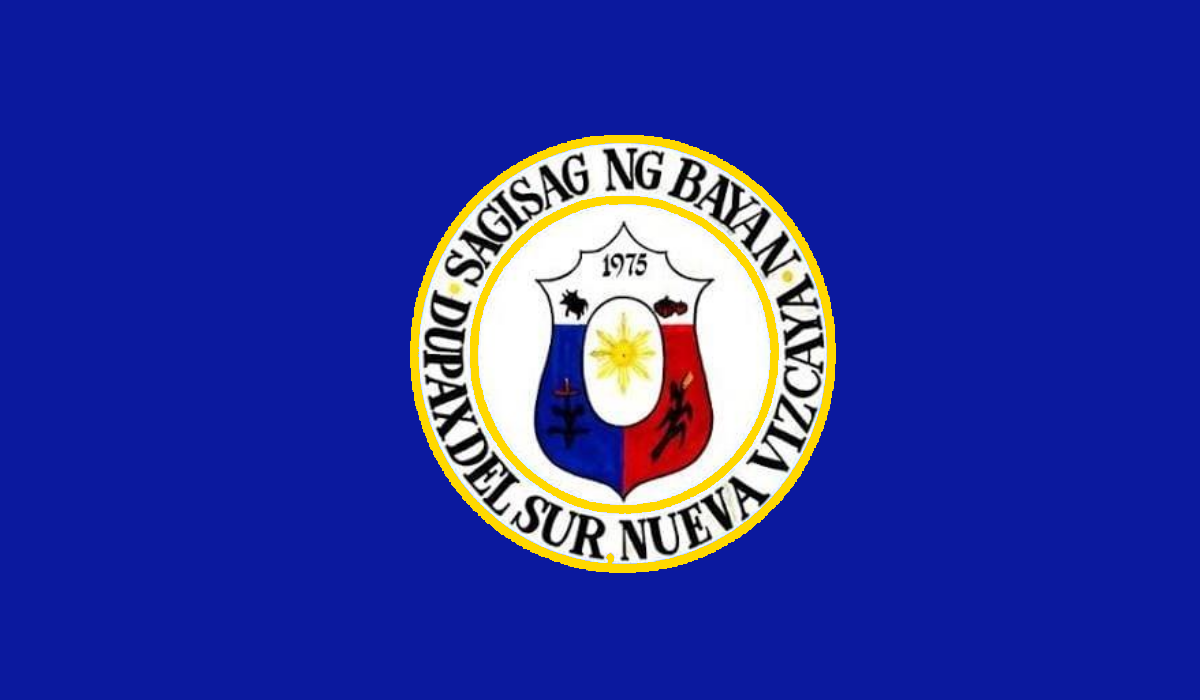
- Flag Seal
- Nickname: Heart of Nueva Vizcaya
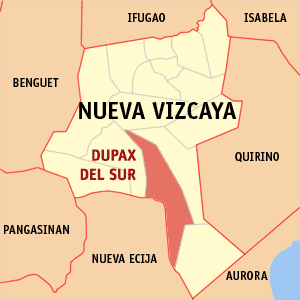
- Map of Nueva Vizcaya with Dupax del Sur highlighted
- Interactive map of Dupax del Sur
- Location within the Philippines
- Coordinates: 16°17′03″N 121°05′30″E
- Country: Philippines
- Region: Cagayan Valley
- Province: Nueva Vizcaya
- District: Lone district
- Founded: November 8, 1971
- Barangays: 19 (see Barangays)

Government
  - Type: Sangguniang Bayan
  - Mayor: Neil M. Magaway
  - Vice Mayor: Ruben Basconcillo Jr.
  - Congressman: Luisa L. Cuaresma
  - Electorate: 14,029 voters (2025)

Area
  - Total: 374.70 km^{2} (144.67 sq mi)
- Elevation: 427 m (1,401 ft)
- Highest elevation: 815 m (2,674 ft)
- Lowest elevation: 343 m (1,125 ft)

Population (2024 census)
  - Total: 22,388
  - Density: 59.749/km^{2} (154.75/sq mi)
  - Households: 5,120

Economy
  - Income class: 1st municipal income class
  - Poverty incidence: 7.76% (2023)
  - Revenue: ₱ 259.4 million (2024)
  - Assets: ₱ 775.5 million (2024)
  - Expenditure: ₱ 209.5 million (2024)
  - Liabilities: ₱ 123.5 million (2024)

Service provider
  - Electricity: Nueva Vizcaya Electric Cooperative (NUVELCO)
- Time zone: UTC+8 (PST)
- ZIP code: 3707
- PSGC: 0205008000
- IDD : area code: +63 (0)78
- Native languages: Ilocano; Gaddang; Isinai; Tagalog

Dupax del Sur, officially the Municipality of Dupax del Sur, is a municipality in the province of Nueva Vizcaya, Philippines. According to the 2024 census, it has a population of 22,388 people.

== Etymology ==
The name Dupax came from the Isinay word "dopaj" which means "to lie down in complete relaxation and rest", the thing the natives wanted to do, upon repairing their camp and eating their catch, after hunting in the forest and before going homes.

Prior to the establishment of Dupax, the site of what would be its town proper served as a camp for hunters from surrounding tribal settlements.

The area, either a plain or a valley, was located near their hunting grounds, and became their settlement as the town of Dopaj. After the Spanish arrived, the name was spelled as Dupax due to the Spanish orthography of the time.

== History ==
The town of Dupax was first discovered by Luis Pérez Dasmariñas in 1591. Eighteen years later, the mission was established by the Dominicans, but was later abandoned due to territorial disputes with the Franciscans.

Colonization seemed difficult for decades. In 1717, Fr. Alejandro Cacho came on mission to Dupax and established Christian communities. In June 1726, Spanish Augustinian missionaries arrived in the locality. On April 22, 1731, Dupax was formally founded by Fr. Nicolás Norbantes and Fr. Agustín San Juan, making it the oldest surviving municipality of Nueva Vizcaya.

In the early 18th century, Dupax was inhabited by three tribal groups. The Carao from Benguet lived with the Isinai, the town's first inhabitants, in the present territory. The other two were the Mala-at and the Bugcalot.

Mala-at people, who were the first settlers found by the Spanish colonizers in Dupax, are said to be ancestors of the Isinai who now inhabit the locality. They were forced to migrate to the hinterlands as ethnic groups from other provinces, especially the Ilocanos, Igorots, lfugaos, arrived before and after the turn of the century.

The original town of Dupax was the largest municipality of Nueva Vizcaya in terms of land area. The first head of the town, was Mandalito, an Ilongot. Eventually, prominent men representing the three tribal districts were appointed, namely: Dayag, who headed the Mala-ats; Tiun Pising, who headed the Igorot; and Bartolo, who headed the Ilongot.

As early as 1928, during the term of mayor Inocencio Suson, attempts were made to transfer the seat to the barrio of Malasin. However, the plan was eventually materialized with a bill authored by Representative Leonardo B. Pérez. By virtue of Republic Act (RA) No. 1181 approved on June 20, 1954, the seat of government was transferred from old población to Barrio Malasin.

Dupax was later divided into three separate municipalities. RA No. 6372, sponsored by Representative Benjamin Perez and Senator Leonardo Perez, was approved on August 16, 1971, partitioning Dupax into the towns of Dupax del Norte and Dupax del Sur. The latter kept the old población of Dupax, continuing as the seat of government, along with nine barrios and fifteen sitios. The creation of this municipality was ratified in a plebiscite held on November 8, 1971; the partition was implemented through Presidential Decree No. 586 promulgated by President Ferdinand Marcos, Sr on November 20, 1974.

In 1979, through Batas Pambansa Blg. 27 approved by Marcos, the municipality of Alfonso Castañeda was established upon separation of two barangays, including Lublub which was designated its seat of government, and seven sitios in the municipality, along with parts of Dupax del Norte.

== Geography ==
Dupax del Sur is situated 28.24 kilometres (17.55 mi) from the provincial capital Bayombong, and 271.98 kilometres (169.00 mi) from the country's capital city of Manila.

=== Barangays ===
Dupax del Sur is politically subdivided into 19 barangays. Each barangay consists of puroks and some have sitios.

- Abaca
- Bagumbayan
- Balzain
- Banila
- Biruk
- Canabay
- Carolotan
- Domang
- Dopaj
- Gabut
- Ganao (Lingad)
- Kimbutan
- Kinabuan
- Lukidnon
- Mangayang
- Palabotan
- Sanguit
- Santa Maria
- Talbek

=== Climate ===
Climate data for Dupax del Sur, Nueva Vizcaya
Month	Jan	Feb	Mar	Apr	May	Jun	Jul	Aug	Sep	Oct	Nov	Dec	Year
Mean daily maximum °C (°F)	27 (81)	28 (82)	29 (84)	31 (88)	30 (86)	29 (84)	28 (82)	28 (82)	28 (82)	29 (84)	28 (82)	27 (81)	29 (83)
Mean daily minimum °C (°F)	18 (64)	18 (64)	20 (68)	22 (72)	23 (73)	23 (73)	22 (72)	22 (72)	22 (72)	21 (70)	20 (68)	19 (66)	21 (70)
Average precipitation mm (inches)	21 (0.8)	28 (1.1)	34 (1.3)	58 (2.3)	160 (6.3)	179 (7.0)	226 (8.9)	225 (8.9)	215 (8.5)	168 (6.6)	59 (2.3)	32 (1.3)	1,405 (55.3)
Average rainy days	7.5	8.5	10.9	14.9	23.9	25.7	26.7	25.3	24.9	18.6	11.8	8.9	207.6
Source: Meteoblue

== Culture ==
The town hosts the San Vicente Ferrer Church (Dupax del Sur), which is also known as the Dupax Church or Dopaj Church. The heritage structure is an 18th-century Baroque church located at Barangay Dopaj. The parish church, under the advocation of Saint Vincent Ferrer, is under the jurisdiction of the Roman Catholic Diocese of Bayombong. The church complex has been declared a National Cultural Treasure by the National Museum of the Philippines in July 2001. Its construction was finished in 1776, making it older than other heritage structures in the entire country.

An earlier church structure of modest design might have been erected before 1773 and records tell that the structure may have been reused as a schoolhouse after the erection of the present church at around 1773 by Father Manuel Corripio, OP. By this time, the church of Tuguegarao by Father Antonio Lobato, OP was already standing. Like the earlier Tuguegarao church, Father Corripio had the church of Dupax made of bricks and even had two kilns made near the church complex, one for firing bricks and the other for preparing lime. The current façade, which mimics the silhouette of the earlier Tuguegarao Cathedral and is reflected on the churches of Bayombong and Bambang in Nueva Vizcaya, dates back to 1776 while each level of the bell tower bears inscription of the years when which it must have been completed. Its original titular patron is the Nuestra Señora del Socorro but was replaced by San Vicente Ferrer soon after the mission was returned to the Dominicans.

The façade is divided by cornices into horizontal segments of plastered brick. The first level features a semicircular arched main portal embellished with clay insets. The main doorway is flanked on both sides by two blind windows with an embossed image of the Holy Eucharist. The second story features a niche and two windows framed by embossed carvings. The triangular pediment is divided into two horizontal sections with the lower half pierced with a deeply recessed oculus and the upper part featuring a relief of a cross. The entire pediment is capped by undulating cornices and seven finials, with the central finial crowned with a cross.

To the left of the façade is the four-level, unplastered, rectangular bell tower. The base features saint's niches similar to that found on the second level of the façade while the second level features long, narrow windows framed with bracket columns. The tower is capped with a decorative parapet and a small cupola surmounted by a cross. The church plaza is enclosed by a low perimeter wall and a replica of an earlier atrial cross.

Two focal points inside the church are the pillars supporting the choir loft. The two, white-washed pillars are embellished with reliefs of cherubs, shells, florals and arabesques. Similar motifs can also be found on the baptistery. The original main altarpiece and pulpit are still intact but the heads of the images in the altarpiece are believed to be replicas of the ivory ones stolen over the course of the church's history.

The Dupax del Sur Church has officially been declared a National Cultural Treasure of the Philippines. In 2015, the Dampol Bridge was also declared as a National Cultural Treasure, where both heritage sites were collectively named by the National Commission for Culture and the Arts as the San Vicente Ferrer Church Complex and Dampol Bridge of Dupax Del Sur. The declaration remains as the only National Cultural Treasure declaration in the entire Nueva Vizcaya province.

Due to the outstanding cultural value of the town of Dupax del Sur, many scholars have been pushing for its inclusion in the Tentative List of UNESCO World Heritage Sites of the Philippines.

== Demographics ==
Population census of Dupax del Sur

Year	Pop.	±% p.a.
1903	1,946	—
1918	3,669	+4.32%
1939	6,767	+2.96%
1948	8,904	+3.10%
1960	10,993	+1.77%
1970	18,241	+5.19%
1975	10,161	−11.07%
1980	9,632	−1.06%

Year	Pop.	±% p.a.
1990	12,297	+2.47%
1995	13,900	+2.32%
2000	16,371	+3.57%
2007	17,354	+0.81%
2010	18,146	+1.64%
2015	19,111	+0.99%
2020	21,224	+2.23%
2024	22,388	+1.29%

Source: Philippine Statistics Authority

== Economy ==
Poverty incidence of Dupax del Sur (%)

Source: Philippine Statistics Authority

== Government ==
=== Local government ===
Dupax del Sur is part of the lone congressional district of the province of Nueva Vizcaya. It is governed by a mayor, designated as its local chief executive, and by a municipal council as its legislative body in accordance with the Local Government Code. The mayor, vice mayor, and the municipal councilors are elected directly in polls held every three years.

=== Elected officials ===
Members of the Municipal Council (2019–2022)
Position	Name
Congressman	Luisa L. Cuaresma
Mayor	Ruben S. Basconcillo Jr.
Vice-Mayor	Neil M. Magaway
Councilors	Emilio C. Felix
Councilors	Ferdinand D. Donguis
Councilors	Johnny A. Baguidudol
Councilors	Rodel R. Campo
Councilors	Educar P. Daran
Councilors	Dario L. Dupos Sr.
Councilors	Bernard B. Reyes
Councilors	Marson B. As-as

== Education ==
The Schools Division of Nueva Vizcaya governs the town's public education system. The division office is a field office of the DepEd in Cagayan Valley region. The Dupax del Sur School District Office governs all public and private elementary and high schools throughout the municipality.

=== Primary and elementary schools ===
- Abaca Elementary School
- Banila Elementary School
- Betawang Elementary School
- Canabay Elementary School
- Carolotan Elementary School
- Castro Elementary School
- Dupax del Sur Central School
- Ecameging Elementary School
- Gabut Elementary School
- Ganao Elementary School
- Governor Alfonso Castañeda ES
- Kinabuan Elementary School
- Lukidnon Elementary School
- Mangayang Elementary School
- Palabotan Elementary School
- Saint Mary's School of Dupax (Elementary)
- Sanguit Elementary School
- Talbec Elementary School

=== Secondary schools ===
- Carolotan High School
- Dupax del Sur NHS
- Ganao National HS
- Saint Mary's School of Dupax
