= Nueva Vizcaya's at-large congressional district =

Congressional district of the Philippines in the province of Nueva Vizcaya

- Constituency for the House of Representatives of the Philippines
- Location of Nueva Vizcaya within the Philippines
- Province: Nueva Vizcaya
- Region: Cagayan Valley
- Population: 497,432 (2020)
- Electorate: 303,090 (2025)
- Area: 4,221.45 km^{2} (1,629.91 sq mi)

Current constituency
- Created: 1916 (single-member district)
- Representative: Tim Cayton
- Political party: PFP
- Congressional bloc: Majority

Nueva Vizcaya's at-large congressional district, also known as Nueva Vizcaya's lone district, is the sole congressional district of the Philippines in the province of Nueva Vizcaya for various national legislatures since 1898. The province first elected its representative provincewide at-large for the Malolos Congress of the First Philippine Republic. In 1907, when the Philippine Assembly was established, the province had no representation as it was then classified as a special province under the supervision of the Department of the Interior's Bureau of Non-Christian Tribes. Since 1916 when it was re-established as a specially organized province separate from its former Comandancia de Quiañgan which became the Ifugao sub-province under the Jones Law, Nueva Vizcaya has been entitled to one member in the House of Representatives. It remains as a single-member district, except for a brief period between 1943 and 1944 when a second seat was allocated in the National Assembly of the Second Philippine Republic.

The district served as an electoral district in the 1934 Constitutional Convention and in the 1971 Constitutional Convention, with two delegates representing Nueva Vizcaya at-large in each.

The district is currently represented by Tim Cayton of Partido Federal ng Pilipinas (PFP).

== Recent election results from province-wide races ==
Year	Office	Results
2022	President	Bongbong Marcos (PFP) 81.66%
2022	Vice President	Sara Duterte (Lakas) 75.53%
2022	Governor	Carlos Padilla (Nacionalista) 59.48%
2025	Governor	Jose Gambito (PFP) 61.66%

== List of members representing the district ==
=== Malolos Congress (1898–1901) ===
Seat A					Seat B					Legislature	Constituencies
Portrait	Member (Lifespan)	Term of office	Party	Electoral history	Portrait	Member (Lifespan)	Term of office	Party	Electoral history	Legislature	Constituencies
District created June 18, 1898.
	Evaristo Pañganiban	September 15, 1898 – March 23, 1901	Nonpartisan	Elected in 1898.		Hipolito Magsalin	September 15, 1898 – March 23, 1901	Nonpartisan	Appointed by President Emilio Aguinaldo.	Malolos Congress	1898–1901 [data missing]

=== House of Representatives (1916–1935) ===
Portrait	Member (Lifespan)	Term of office	Party	Legislature	Electoral history	Constituencies
District re-created August 29, 1916.
	Wenceslao Valera (1851–1931)	March 19, 1917 – June 3, 1919	Nacionalista	4th Legislature	Appointed.	1917–1919; Bagabag, Bambang, Bayombong, Dupax, Imugan, Kayapa, Santa Cruz, Solano
	Evaristo Pañganiban	June 3, 1919 – June 12, 1924	Independent	5th Legislature	Appointed. Resigned.	1922–1933; Aritao, Bagabag, Bambang, Bayombong, Dupax, Imugan, Kayapa, Santa Cruz, Solano
	Evaristo Pañganiban	June 3, 1919 – June 12, 1924	Nacionalista Unipersonalista	6th Legislature	Appointed. Resigned.	1922–1933; Aritao, Bagabag, Bambang, Bayombong, Dupax, Imugan, Kayapa, Santa Cruz, Solano
	Eulogio Rodriguez (1883–1964)	June 12, 1924 – May 1925	Democrata	6th Legislature	Appointed. Resigned on election as Rizal's 2nd district representative.	1922–1933; Aritao, Bagabag, Bambang, Bayombong, Dupax, Imugan, Kayapa, Santa Cruz, Solano
	Antonio Escamilla	January 1, 1926 – June 5, 1928	Independent	7th Legislature	Appointed.	1922–1933; Aritao, Bagabag, Bambang, Bayombong, Dupax, Imugan, Kayapa, Santa Cruz, Solano
	Manuel Nieto (1892–1980)	June 5, 1928 – June 2, 1931	Nacionalista Consolidado	8th Legislature	Appointed.	1922–1933; Aritao, Bagabag, Bambang, Bayombong, Dupax, Imugan, Kayapa, Santa Cruz, Solano
	Domingo Maddela	June 2, 1931 – June 5, 1934	Nacionalista Consolidado	9th Legislature	Appointed.	1922–1933; Aritao, Bagabag, Bambang, Bayombong, Dupax, Imugan, Kayapa, Santa Cruz, Solano
	Domingo Maddela	June 2, 1931 – June 5, 1934	Nacionalista Consolidado	9th Legislature	Appointed.	1933–1935; Aritao, Bagabag, Bambang, Bayombong, Dupax, Imugan, Kasibu, Kayapa, Pinappagan, Santa Cruz, Solano
	Severino Purugganan (1892–1939)	June 5, 1934 – November 15, 1935	Nacionalista Democratico	10th Legislature	Appointed.	1933–1935; Aritao, Bagabag, Bambang, Bayombong, Dupax, Imugan, Kasibu, Kayapa, Pinappagan, Santa Cruz, Solano

=== 1934 Constitutional Convention (1934–1935) ===
Seat A					Seat B					Legislature	Constituencies
Portrait	Member (Lifespan)	Term of office	Party	Electoral history	Portrait	Member (Lifespan)	Term of office	Party	Electoral history	Legislature	Constituencies
	Leon Cabarroguis (1893–1967)	July 30, 1934 – February 19, 1935	Nonpartisan	Elected in 1934.		Demetrio Quirino	July 30, 1934 – February 19, 1935	Nonpartisan	Elected in 1934.	1934 Constitutional Convention	1934–1935; Aritao, Bagabag, Bambang, Bayombong, Dupax, Imugan, Kasibu, Kayapa, Pinappagan, Santa Cruz, Solano

=== National Assembly (1935–1945) ===
==== Commonwealth ====
Portrait	Member (Lifespan)	Term of office	Party	Legislature	Electoral history	Constituencies
	Bernardo Buenafe	November 15, 1935 – January 9, 1936	Nacionalista Democratico	1st National Assembly	Re-elected in 1935. Resigned on appointment as Resident Commissioner.	1935–1941; Aritao, Bagabag, Bambang, Bayombong, Dupax, Imugan, Kasibu, Kayapa, Pinappagan, Santa Cruz, Solano
	Guillermo Bongolan	December 30, 1938 – December 30, 1941	Nacionalista	2nd National Assembly	Elected in 1938.	1935–1941; Aritao, Bagabag, Bambang, Bayombong, Dupax, Imugan, Kasibu, Kayapa, Pinappagan, Santa Cruz, Solano

==== Second Republic ====
Seat A					Seat B					Legislature	Constituencies
Portrait	Member (Lifespan)	Term of office	Party	Electoral history	Portrait	Member (Lifespan)	Term of office	Party	Electoral history	Legislature	Constituencies
District re-created September 7, 1943.
	Guillermo Bongolan	September 25, 1943 – February 2, 1944	KALIBAPI	Elected in 1943.		Demetrio Quirino	September 25, 1943 – February 2, 1944	KALIBAPI	Appointed as an ex officio member. (Note: As Governor of Nueva Vizcaya.)	National Assembly (Second Republic)	1943–1944; Aritao, Bagabag, Bambang, Bayombong, Dupax, Imugan, Kasibu, Kayapa, Pinappagan, Santa Cruz, Solano

=== House of Representatives (1945–1973) ===
Portrait	Member (Lifespan)	Term of office	Party	Legislature	Electoral history	Constituencies
District re-created May 24, 1945.
	Leon Cabarroguis (1893–1967)	June 11, 1945 – December 30, 1953	Nacionalista	1st Commonwealth Congress	Elected in 1941.	1945–1950; Aritao, Bagabag, Bambang, Bayombong, Dupax, Imugan, Kasibu, Kayapa, Pinappagan, Pingkian, Solano
	Leon Cabarroguis (1893–1967)	June 11, 1945 – December 30, 1953	Liberal	2nd Commonwealth Congress	Re-elected in 1946.	1945–1950; Aritao, Bagabag, Bambang, Bayombong, Dupax, Imugan, Kasibu, Kayapa, Pinappagan, Pingkian, Solano
	Leon Cabarroguis (1893–1967)	June 11, 1945 – December 30, 1953	Liberal	1st Congress	Re-elected in 1946.	1945–1950; Aritao, Bagabag, Bambang, Bayombong, Dupax, Imugan, Kasibu, Kayapa, Pinappagan, Pingkian, Solano
	Leon Cabarroguis (1893–1967)	June 11, 1945 – December 30, 1953	Liberal	2nd Congress	Re-elected in 1949.	1945–1950; Aritao, Bagabag, Bambang, Bayombong, Dupax, Imugan, Kasibu, Kayapa, Pinappagan, Pingkian, Solano
	Leon Cabarroguis (1893–1967)	June 11, 1945 – December 30, 1953	Liberal	2nd Congress	Re-elected in 1949.	1950–1956; Aglipay, Aritao, Bagabag, Bambang, Bayombong, Diffun, Dupax, Kayapa, Solano
	Leonardo B. Perez (1925–2007)	December 30, 1953 – December 30, 1967	Nacionalista	3rd Congress	Elected in 1953.	1950–1956; Aglipay, Aritao, Bagabag, Bambang, Bayombong, Diffun, Dupax, Kayapa, Solano
	Leonardo B. Perez (1925–2007)	December 30, 1953 – December 30, 1967	Nacionalista	3rd Congress	Elected in 1953.	1956–1957; Aglipay, Aritao, Bagabag, Bambang, Bayombong, Dupax, Kasibu, Kayapa, Solano
	Leonardo B. Perez (1925–2007)	December 30, 1953 – December 30, 1967	Nacionalista	4th Congress	Re-elected in 1957.	1956–1957; Aglipay, Aritao, Bagabag, Bambang, Bayombong, Dupax, Kasibu, Kayapa, Solano
	Leonardo B. Perez (1925–2007)	December 30, 1953 – December 30, 1967	Nacionalista	4th Congress	Re-elected in 1957.	1957–1959; Aglipay, Aritao, Bagabag, Bambang, Bayombong, Diffun, Dupax, Ibung, Kasibu, Kayapa, Maddela, Solano
	Leonardo B. Perez (1925–2007)	December 30, 1953 – December 30, 1967	Nacionalista	4th Congress	Re-elected in 1957.	1959–1961; Aglipay, Aritao, Bagabag, Bambang, Bayombong, Diffun, Dupax, Ibung, Kasibu, Kayapa, Maddela, Santa Fe, Solano
	Leonardo B. Perez (1925–2007)	December 30, 1953 – December 30, 1967	Nacionalista	4th Congress	Re-elected in 1957.	1961–1963; Aglipay, Aritao, Bagabag, Bambang, Bayombong, Diffun, Dupax, Ibung, Kasibu, Kayapa, Maddela, Quezon, Santa Fe, Solano
	Leonardo B. Perez (1925–2007)	December 30, 1953 – December 30, 1967	Nacionalista	5th Congress	Re-elected in 1961.	1961–1963; Aglipay, Aritao, Bagabag, Bambang, Bayombong, Diffun, Dupax, Ibung, Kasibu, Kayapa, Maddela, Quezon, Santa Fe, Solano
	Leonardo B. Perez (1925–2007)	December 30, 1953 – December 30, 1967	Nacionalista	6th Congress	Re-elected in 1965. Resigned on election as senator.	1961–1963; Aglipay, Aritao, Bagabag, Bambang, Bayombong, Diffun, Dupax, Ibung, Kasibu, Kayapa, Maddela, Quezon, Santa Fe, Solano
	Leonardo B. Perez (1925–2007)	December 30, 1953 – December 30, 1967	Nacionalista	6th Congress	Re-elected in 1965. Resigned on election as senator.	1963–1966; Aglipay, Aritao, Bagabag, Bambang, Bayombong, Diffun, Dupax, Kasibu, Kayapa, Maddela, Quezon, Santa Fe, Solano, Villaverde
	Leonardo B. Perez (1925–2007)	December 30, 1953 – December 30, 1967	Nacionalista	6th Congress	Re-elected in 1965. Resigned on election as senator.	1966–1967; Ambaguio, Aritao, Bagabag, Bambang, Bayombong, Dupax, Kasibu, Kayapa, Quezon, Santa Fe, Solano, Villaverde
	Leonardo B. Perez (1925–2007)	December 30, 1953 – December 30, 1967	Nacionalista	6th Congress	Re-elected in 1965. Resigned on election as senator.	1967–1971; Ambaguio, Aritao, Bagabag, Bambang, Bayombong, Diadi, Dupax, Kasibu, Kayapa, Quezon, Santa Fe, Solano, Villaverde
Vacant (December 30, 1967 – December 30, 1969)				6th Congress	No special election held to fill vacancy.	1967–1971; Ambaguio, Aritao, Bagabag, Bambang, Bayombong, Diadi, Dupax, Kasibu, Kayapa, Quezon, Santa Fe, Solano, Villaverde
	Benjamin Perez	December 30, 1969 – January 17, 1973	Nacionalista	7th Congress	Elected in 1969. Term cut short upon the ratification of a new Constitution.	1967–1971; Ambaguio, Aritao, Bagabag, Bambang, Bayombong, Diadi, Dupax, Kasibu, Kayapa, Quezon, Santa Fe, Solano, Villaverde
	Benjamin Perez	December 30, 1969 – January 17, 1973	Nacionalista	7th Congress	Elected in 1969. Term cut short upon the ratification of a new Constitution.	1971–1973; Ambaguio, Aritao, Bagabag, Bambang, Bayombong, Diadi, Dupax del Norte, Dupax del Sur, Kasibu, Kayapa, Quezon, Santa Fe, Solano, Villaverde
District dissolved into the seven-seat Region II's at-large district for the Interim Batasang Pambansa.

=== 1971 Constitutional Convention (1971–1972) ===
Seat A					Seat B					Legislature	Constituencies
Portrait	Member (Lifespan)	Term of office	Party	Electoral history	Portrait	Member (Lifespan)	Term of office	Party	Electoral history	Legislature	Constituencies
	Jose Calderon	June 1, 1971 – November 29, 1972	Nonpartisan	Elected in 1970.		Demetrio Quirino Jr.	June 1, 1971 – November 29, 1972	Nonpartisan	Elected in 1970.	1971 Constitutional Convention	1971–1972; Ambaguio, Aritao, Bagabag, Bambang, Bayombong, Diadi, Dupax del Norte, Dupax del Sur, Kasibu, Kayapa, Quezon, Santa Fe, Solano, Villaverde

=== Batasang Pambansa (1978–1986) ===
Portrait	Member (Lifespan)	Term of office	Party	Legislature	Electoral history	Constituencies
District re-created February 1, 1984.
	Leonardo B. Perez (1925–2007)	June 30, 1984 – March 25, 1986	KBL	Regular Batasang Pambansa	Elected in 1984.	1984–1986; Alfonso Castañeda, Ambaguio, Aritao, Bagabag, Bambang, Bayombong, Diadi, Dupax del Norte, Dupax del Sur, Kasibu, Kayapa, Quezon, Santa Fe, Solano, Villaverde

=== House of Representatives (1987–present) ===
Portrait	Member (Lifespan)	Term of office	Party	Legislature	Electoral history	Constituencies
District re-created February 2, 1987.
	Carlos Padilla (1944–2023)	June 30, 1987 – June 30, 1992	PDP–Laban	8th Congress	Elected in 1987.	1987–present Alfonso Castañeda, Ambaguio, Aritao, Bagabag, Bambang, Bayombong, Diadi, Dupax del Norte, Dupax del Sur, Kasibu, Kayapa, Quezon, Santa Fe, Solano, Villaverde
	Leonardo B. Perez (1925–2007)	June 30, 1992 – June 30, 1995	NPC	9th Congress	Elected in 1992.	1987–present Alfonso Castañeda, Ambaguio, Aritao, Bagabag, Bambang, Bayombong, Diadi, Dupax del Norte, Dupax del Sur, Kasibu, Kayapa, Quezon, Santa Fe, Solano, Villaverde
	Carlos Padilla (1944–2023)	June 30, 1995 – June 30, 2001	LDP	10th Congress	Elected in 1995.	1987–present Alfonso Castañeda, Ambaguio, Aritao, Bagabag, Bambang, Bayombong, Diadi, Dupax del Norte, Dupax del Sur, Kasibu, Kayapa, Quezon, Santa Fe, Solano, Villaverde
	Carlos Padilla (1944–2023)	June 30, 1995 – June 30, 2001	LDP	11th Congress	Re-elected in 1998.	1987–present Alfonso Castañeda, Ambaguio, Aritao, Bagabag, Bambang, Bayombong, Diadi, Dupax del Norte, Dupax del Sur, Kasibu, Kayapa, Quezon, Santa Fe, Solano, Villaverde
	Carlos Padilla (1944–2023)	June 30, 1995 – June 30, 2001	LDP	12th Congress	Re-elected in 2001.	1987–present Alfonso Castañeda, Ambaguio, Aritao, Bagabag, Bambang, Bayombong, Diadi, Dupax del Norte, Dupax del Sur, Kasibu, Kayapa, Quezon, Santa Fe, Solano, Villaverde
	Rodolfo Agbayani (born 1936)	June 30, 2004 – June 30, 2007	LDP	13th Congress	Elected in 2004.	1987–present Alfonso Castañeda, Ambaguio, Aritao, Bagabag, Bambang, Bayombong, Diadi, Dupax del Norte, Dupax del Sur, Kasibu, Kayapa, Quezon, Santa Fe, Solano, Villaverde
	Carlos Padilla (1944–2023)	June 30, 2007 – June 30, 2016	Nacionalista	14th Congress	Elected in 2007.	1987–present Alfonso Castañeda, Ambaguio, Aritao, Bagabag, Bambang, Bayombong, Diadi, Dupax del Norte, Dupax del Sur, Kasibu, Kayapa, Quezon, Santa Fe, Solano, Villaverde
	Carlos Padilla (1944–2023)	June 30, 2007 – June 30, 2016	Nacionalista	15th Congress	Re-elected in 2010.	1987–present Alfonso Castañeda, Ambaguio, Aritao, Bagabag, Bambang, Bayombong, Diadi, Dupax del Norte, Dupax del Sur, Kasibu, Kayapa, Quezon, Santa Fe, Solano, Villaverde
	Carlos Padilla (1944–2023)	June 30, 2007 – June 30, 2016	Nacionalista	16th Congress	Re-elected in 2013.	1987–present Alfonso Castañeda, Ambaguio, Aritao, Bagabag, Bambang, Bayombong, Diadi, Dupax del Norte, Dupax del Sur, Kasibu, Kayapa, Quezon, Santa Fe, Solano, Villaverde
	Luisa Cuaresma (born 1955)	June 30, 2016 – June 30, 2025	UNA	17th Congress	Elected in 2016.	1987–present Alfonso Castañeda, Ambaguio, Aritao, Bagabag, Bambang, Bayombong, Diadi, Dupax del Norte, Dupax del Sur, Kasibu, Kayapa, Quezon, Santa Fe, Solano, Villaverde
	Luisa Cuaresma (born 1955)	June 30, 2016 – June 30, 2025	NUP	18th Congress	Re-elected in 2019.	1987–present Alfonso Castañeda, Ambaguio, Aritao, Bagabag, Bambang, Bayombong, Diadi, Dupax del Norte, Dupax del Sur, Kasibu, Kayapa, Quezon, Santa Fe, Solano, Villaverde
	Luisa Cuaresma (born 1955)	June 30, 2016 – June 30, 2025	Lakas (until 2024)	19th Congress	Re-elected in 2022.	1987–present Alfonso Castañeda, Ambaguio, Aritao, Bagabag, Bambang, Bayombong, Diadi, Dupax del Norte, Dupax del Sur, Kasibu, Kayapa, Quezon, Santa Fe, Solano, Villaverde
	Luisa Cuaresma (born 1955)	June 30, 2016 – June 30, 2025	UNA (from 2024)	19th Congress	Re-elected in 2022.	1987–present Alfonso Castañeda, Ambaguio, Aritao, Bagabag, Bambang, Bayombong, Diadi, Dupax del Norte, Dupax del Sur, Kasibu, Kayapa, Quezon, Santa Fe, Solano, Villaverde
	Tim Cayton (born 1981)	June 30, 2025 – present	Aksyon (until 2026)	20th Congress	Elected in 2025.	1987–present Alfonso Castañeda, Ambaguio, Aritao, Bagabag, Bambang, Bayombong, Diadi, Dupax del Norte, Dupax del Sur, Kasibu, Kayapa, Quezon, Santa Fe, Solano, Villaverde
	Tim Cayton (born 1981)	June 30, 2025 – present	PFP (from 2026)	20th Congress	Elected in 2025.	1987–present Alfonso Castañeda, Ambaguio, Aritao, Bagabag, Bambang, Bayombong, Diadi, Dupax del Norte, Dupax del Sur, Kasibu, Kayapa, Quezon, Santa Fe, Solano, Villaverde

== Election results ==
=== 2010 ===
2010 Philippine House of Representatives election in Nueva Vizcaya
Party	Candidate	Votes	%
Nacionalista	Carlos Padilla (incumbent)	108,316	63.75
Liberal	Ralph Lantion	59,473	35.00
Independent	Carlito Labitoria	1,761	1.04
Independent	Lawrence Santa Ana	367	0.22
Valid ballots		169,917	97.03
Invalid or blank votes		5,201	2.97
Total votes		175,118	100.00
Nacionalista hold			

=== 2013 ===
2013 Philippine House of Representatives election in Nueva Vizcaya
Party	Candidate	Votes	%
Nacionalista	Carlos Padilla (incumbent)	77,738	59.58
UNA	Luisa Cuaresma	51,313	39.33
Independent	Lawrence Santa Ana	1,426	1.09
Valid ballots		130,477	95.74
Invalid or blank votes		5,803	4.26
Total votes		136,280	100.00
Nacionalista hold			

=== 2016 ===
2016 Philippine House of Representatives election in Nueva Vizcaya
Party	Candidate	Votes	%
UNA	Luisa Cuaresma	84,616	44.56
Nacionalista	Ruth Padilla	84,217	44.35
Liberal	Donna Lyn Gerdan	20,449	10.77
Independent	Lawrence Santa Ana	631	0.33
Valid ballots		189,913	94.06
Invalid or blank votes		11,992	5.94
Total votes		201,905	100.00
UNA gain from Nacionalista			

=== 2022 ===
2022 Philippine House of Representatives election in Nueva Vizcaya
Party	Candidate	Votes	%
Lakas	Luisa Cuaresma (incumbent)	165,360	72.25
Nacionalista	Flodemonte Gerdan	62,115	27.14
Independent	Lawrence Santa Ana	1,388	0.61
Valid ballots		228,863	90.64
Invalid or blank votes		23,623	9.36
Total votes		252,486	100.00
Lakas hold			

=== 2025 ===
2025 Philippine House of Representatives election in Nueva Vizcaya
Party	Candidate	Votes	%
Aksyon	Tim Cayton	100,291	40.52
Lakas	Tam-an Tomas	76,698	30.99
Nacionalista	Ruth Padilla	57,482	23.22
Independent	Val de Leon	8,597	3.47
Independent	Jun Manghi	2,625	1.06
Independent	Jay Padilla	1,670	0.67
Independent	Lawrence Santa Ana	165	0.07
Total votes		247,528	100.00
Aksyon gain from UNA			
