= Kasibu =

Municipality in Nueva Vizcaya, Philippines

- Municipality
- Municipality of Kasibu
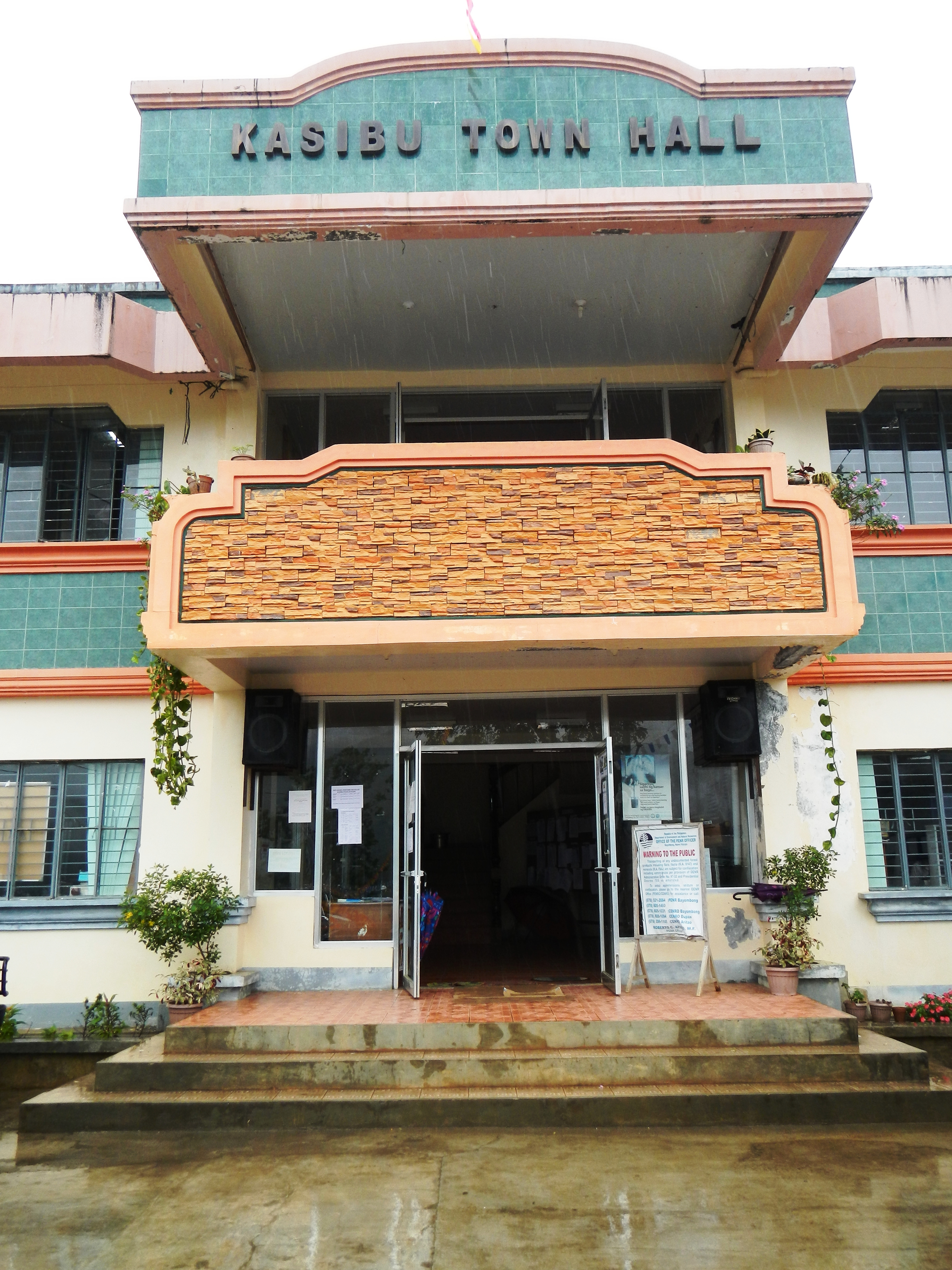
- Municipal hall

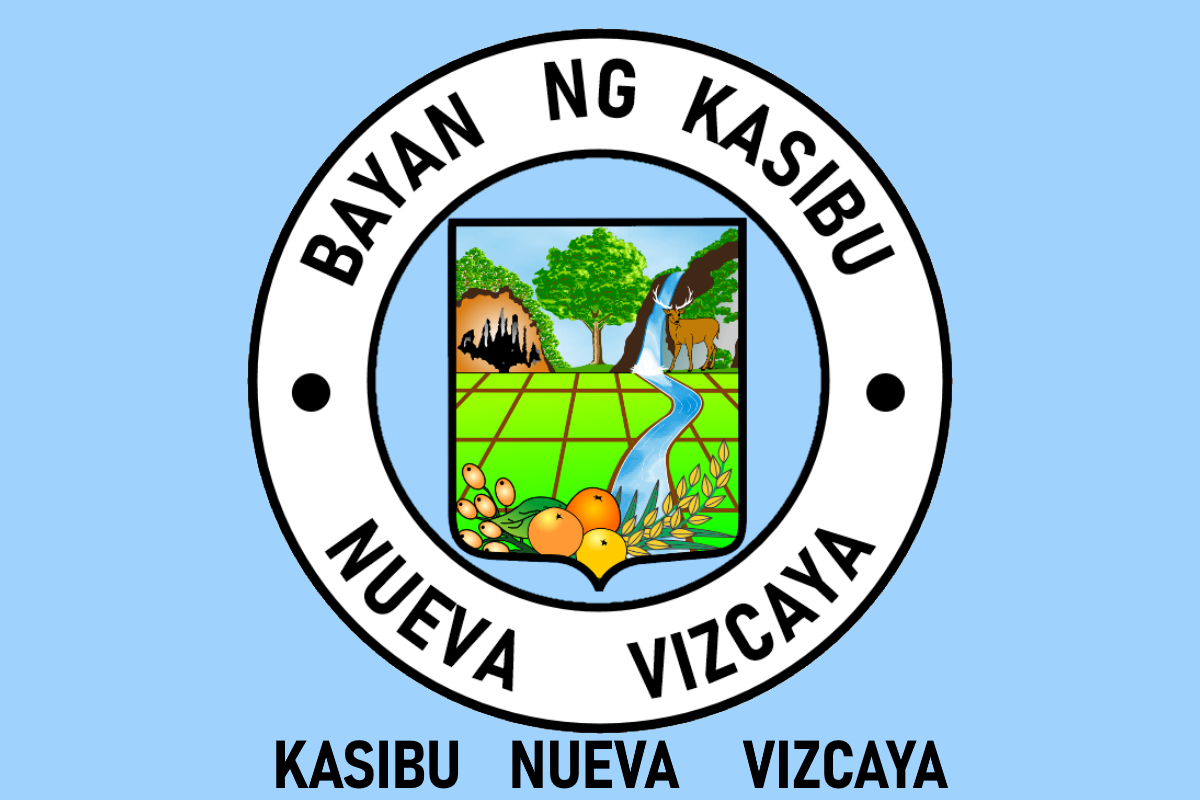
- Flag Seal

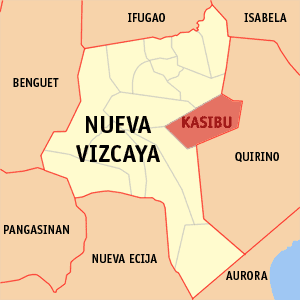
- Map of Nueva Vizcaya with Kasibu highlighted
- Interactive map of Kasibu
- Location within the Philippines
- Coordinates: 16°19′05″N 121°17′45″E
- Country: Philippines
- Region: Cagayan Valley
- Province: Nueva Vizcaya
- District: Lone district
- Barangays: 30 (see Barangays)

Government
  - Type: Sangguniang Bayan
  - Mayor: Romeo C. Tayaban
  - Vice Mayor: Alberto D. Bumolo Jr.
  - Representative: Luisa L. Cuaresma
  - Electorate: 24,998 voters (2025)

Area
  - Total: 318.80 km^{2} (123.09 sq mi)
- Elevation: 873 m (2,864 ft)
- Highest elevation: 1,248 m (4,094 ft)
- Lowest elevation: 678 m (2,224 ft)

Population (2024 census)
  - Total: 46,845
  - Density: 146.94/km^{2} (380.58/sq mi)
  - Households: 9,816

Economy
  - Income class: 1st municipal income class
  - Poverty incidence: 10.61% (2023)
  - Revenue: ₱ 599.8 million (2024)
  - Assets: ₱ 1,399 million (2024)
  - Expenditure: ₱ 405.2 million (2024)
  - Liabilities: ₱ 279.3 million (2024)

Service provider
  - Electricity: Nueva Vizcaya Electric Cooperative (NUVELCO)
- Time zone: UTC+8 (PST)
- ZIP code: 3703
- PSGC: 0205009000
- IDD : area code: +63 (0)78
- Native languages: Ilocano; Gaddang; Bugkalot; Tagalog

Kasibu, officially the Municipality of Kasibu (Gaddang: Ili na Kasibu; Ilocano: Ili ti Kasibu; Tagalog: Bayan ng Kasibu), is a municipality in the province of Nueva Vizcaya, Philippines. According to the 2024 census, it has a population of 46,845 people.

== Etymology ==
The town got its name from the word in the Ilongot language Kasibu which means "a venue where people settle their differences."

== History ==
Long before the creation of the municipal district of Kasibu, there was a school and a constabulary detachment for the Ilongots, which necessitated the establishment of a government in the area. For this reason, the provincial board during Governor Alfonso Castañeda's time requested the Governor-General to authorize the establishment of this place as a provisional municipal district to be supervised and administered by the provincial board through the office of the provincial governor.

By virtue of Executive Order No. 59, signed on January 1, 1926, by Governor General Leonard Wood, Kasibu was established as part of the Municipal District of Bambang. However, by virtue of a Proclamation issued by Governor Leon Cabarroguis in 1933, Kasibu was reorganized as a separate Municipal District. On November 9, 1950, Executive Order No. 368, signed by President Elpidio Quirino, abolished the municipal district structure in government and reattached Kasibu to Bambang. The very low population caused the abolition, as residents started to evacuate and abandon Kasibu due to the presence of dissidents from 1950 to 1955. On January 9, 1956, when peace and order was restored, President Ramon Magsaysay issued Executive Order No. 160 creating Kasibu as a separate municipality, but losing territorial jurisdiction over some of its barrios specifically Payupay, Belance, Oyao, Teguep, Manacgoc, Pangancan and Munguia, all on the eastern side in favor of Dupax del Norte.

== Geography ==
Kasibu is situated 46.45 kilometres (28.86 mi) from the provincial capital Bayombong, and 302.37 kilometres (187.88 mi) from the country's capital city of Manila.

=== Barangays ===
Kasibu is politically subdivided into 30 barangays. Each barangay consists of puroks and some have sitios.

- Antutot
- Alimit
- Poblacion (Alloy)
- Belet
- Binogawan
- Bua
- Biyoy
- Capisaan
- Cordon
- Didipio
- Dine
- Kakiduguen
- Lupa
- Macalong
- Malabing
- Muta
- Pao
- Papaya
- Pudi
- Tukod
- Siguem
- Tadji
- Wangal
- Watwat
- Camamasi
- Catarawan
- Nantawakan
- Alloy
- Kongkong
- Paquet (Ilongot Reservation)

=== Climate ===
Climate data for Kasibu, Nueva Vizcaya
Month	Jan	Feb	Mar	Apr	May	Jun	Jul	Aug	Sep	Oct	Nov	Dec	Year
Mean daily maximum °C (°F)	22 (72)	23 (73)	25 (77)	28 (82)	28 (82)	27 (81)	26 (79)	26 (79)	26 (79)	26 (79)	24 (75)	22 (72)	25 (78)
Mean daily minimum °C (°F)	16 (61)	17 (63)	18 (64)	19 (66)	21 (70)	21 (70)	21 (70)	21 (70)	20 (68)	19 (66)	18 (64)	17 (63)	19 (66)
Average precipitation mm (inches)	89 (3.5)	72 (2.8)	54 (2.1)	61 (2.4)	202 (8.0)	224 (8.8)	263 (10.4)	278 (10.9)	270 (10.6)	192 (7.6)	129 (5.1)	159 (6.3)	1,993 (78.5)
Average rainy days	17.8	14.5	13.5	14.1	22.9	25.6	27.4	26.2	25.3	20.4	17.9	20.3	245.9
Source: Meteoblue

== Demographics ==
Population census of Kasibu

Year	Pop.	±% p.a.
1939	1,591	—
1948	693	−8.82%
1960	803	+1.24%
1970	7,952	+25.74%
1975	11,490	+7.66%
1980	15,029	+5.51%
1990	21,425	+3.61%

Year	Pop.	±% p.a.
1995	26,252	+3.88%
2000	28,239	+1.58%
2007	31,515	+1.53%
2010	33,379	+2.11%
2015	37,705	+2.35%
2020	41,776	+2.18%
2024	46,845	+2.79%

Source: Philippine Statistics Authority

== Economy ==
Kasibu is host to the Didipio mine, a gold and copper mine currently managed by OceanaGold. It produces gold and silver as doré bars and copper in concentrate. The mine claim spans 27,000 hectares in total between the provinces of Nueva Vizcaya and Quirino. It is estimated to hold 1.41 million ounces of gold and 169,400 tons of copper.

Poverty incidence of Kasibu (%)

Source: Philippine Statistics Authority

== Government ==
=== Local government ===
Kasibu is part of the lone congressional district of the province of Nueva Vizcaya. It is governed by a mayor, designated as its local chief executive, and by a municipal council as its legislative body in accordance with the Local Government Code. The mayor, vice mayor, and the municipal councilors are elected directly in polls held every three years.

=== Elected officials ===
Members of the Municipal Council (2019–2022)
Position	Name
Congressman	Luisa L. Cuaresma
Mayor	Romeo C. Tayaban
Vice-Mayor	Alberto D. Bumolo Jr.
Councilors	Bayany B. Aliguyon
Councilors	Dennis B. Canayan
Councilors	Charmaine C. Dulnuan
Councilors	Alfredo D. Tucpi II
Councilors	Johnny N. Alindayo
Councilors	Nelza Mae D. Humiwat
Councilors	Karen Joy B. Cablinan
Councilors	Eddie N. Lugay

== Education ==
The Schools Division of Nueva Vizcaya governs the town's public education system. The division office is a field office of the DepEd in Cagayan Valley region. There two schools district offices which govern all the public and private elementary and high schools throughout the municipality. These are Kasibu East District Office, and Kasibu West District Office.

=== Primary and elementary school ===
- Alimit Elementary School
- Alloy Elementary School
- Antutot Elementary School
- Bilet Elementary School
- Binogawan Elementary School
- Biyoy Elementary School
- Bua Elementary School
- Camamasi Primary School
- Capisaan Elementary School
- Catarawan Elementary School
- Cordon Elementary School
- Didipio Elementary School
- Dine Elementary School
- Domang Elementary School
- Kakiduguen Elementary School
- Kasibu Central School
- Kasibu East Central School
- Kongkong Elementary School
- Logpond-Sabungan Primary School
- Lupa Elementary School
- Macalong Elementary School
- Makiboy Elementary School
- Muta Elementary School
- Nantawakan Primary School
- Pao Elementary School
- Papalungan Elementary School
- Papaya Elementary School
- Paquet Seventh - Day Adventist Elementary School
- Paquet Elementary School
- Pudi Primary School
- Siguem Elementary School
- Tadji Elementary School
- Tukod Primary School
- Upper Parai Primary School
- Wangal Elementary School
- Watwat Elementary School

=== Secondary schools ===
- Eastern Nueva Vizcaya National High School
- Kasibu National Agricultural School
- Kongkong Valley National High School
- Kakiduguen National High School
- Malabing Valley National High School-Integrated Senior High School

== Gallery ==
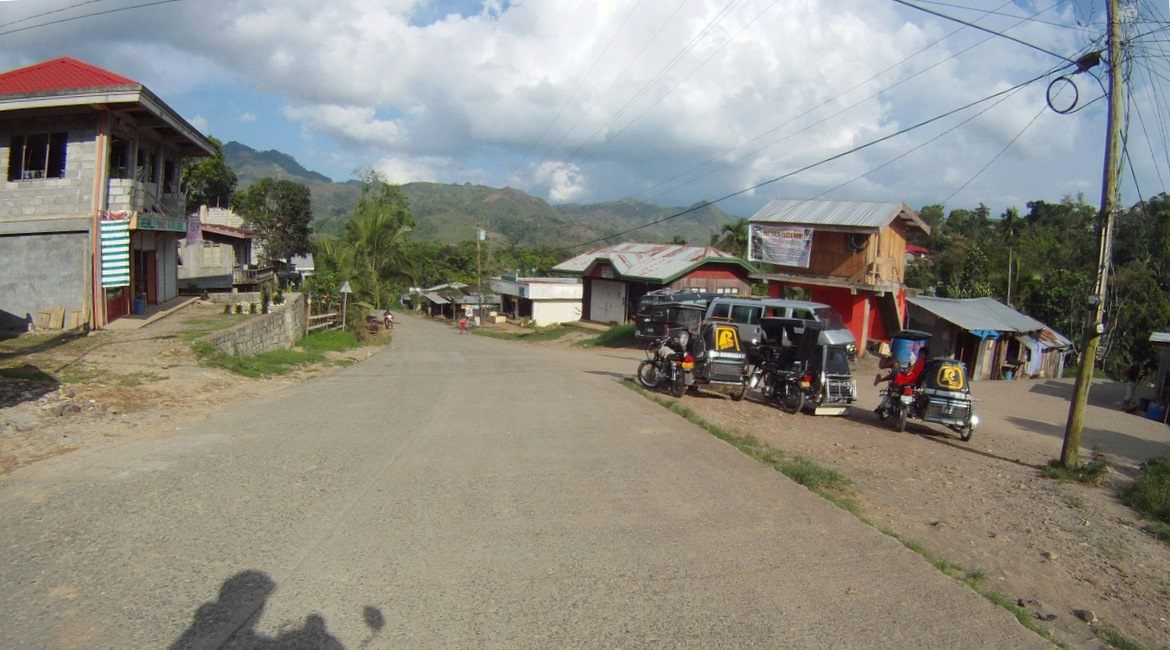

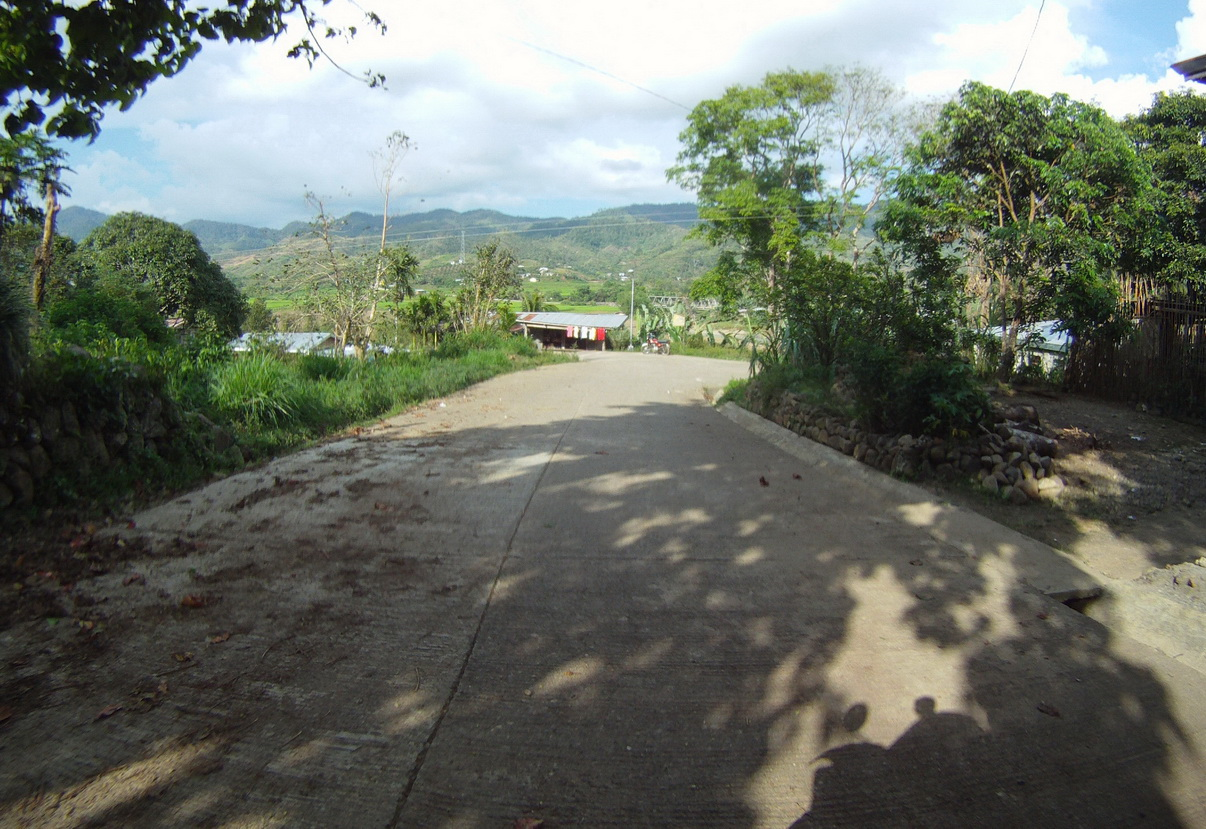

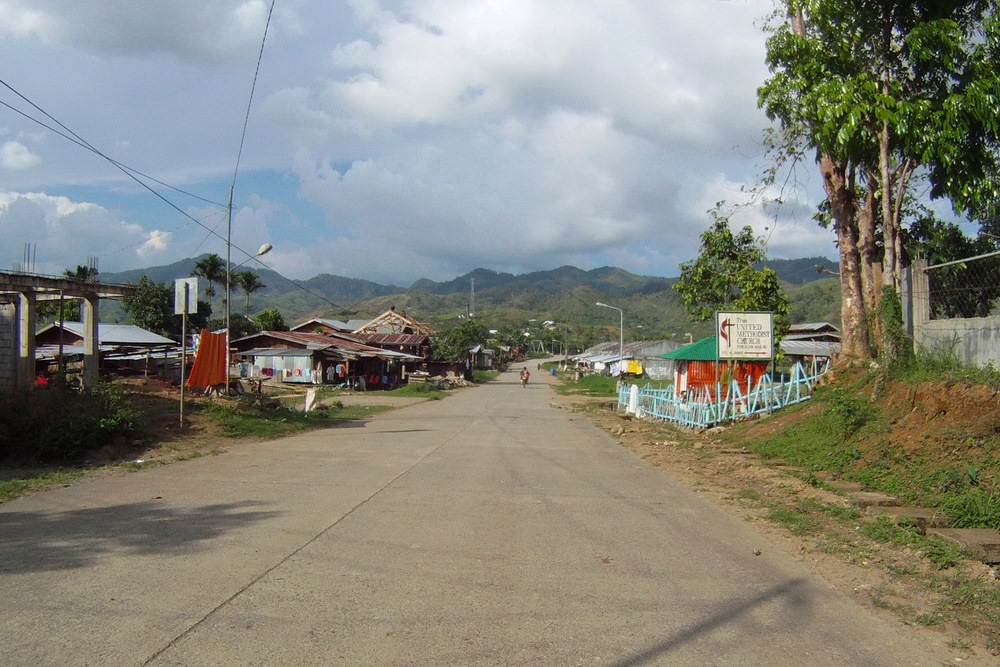

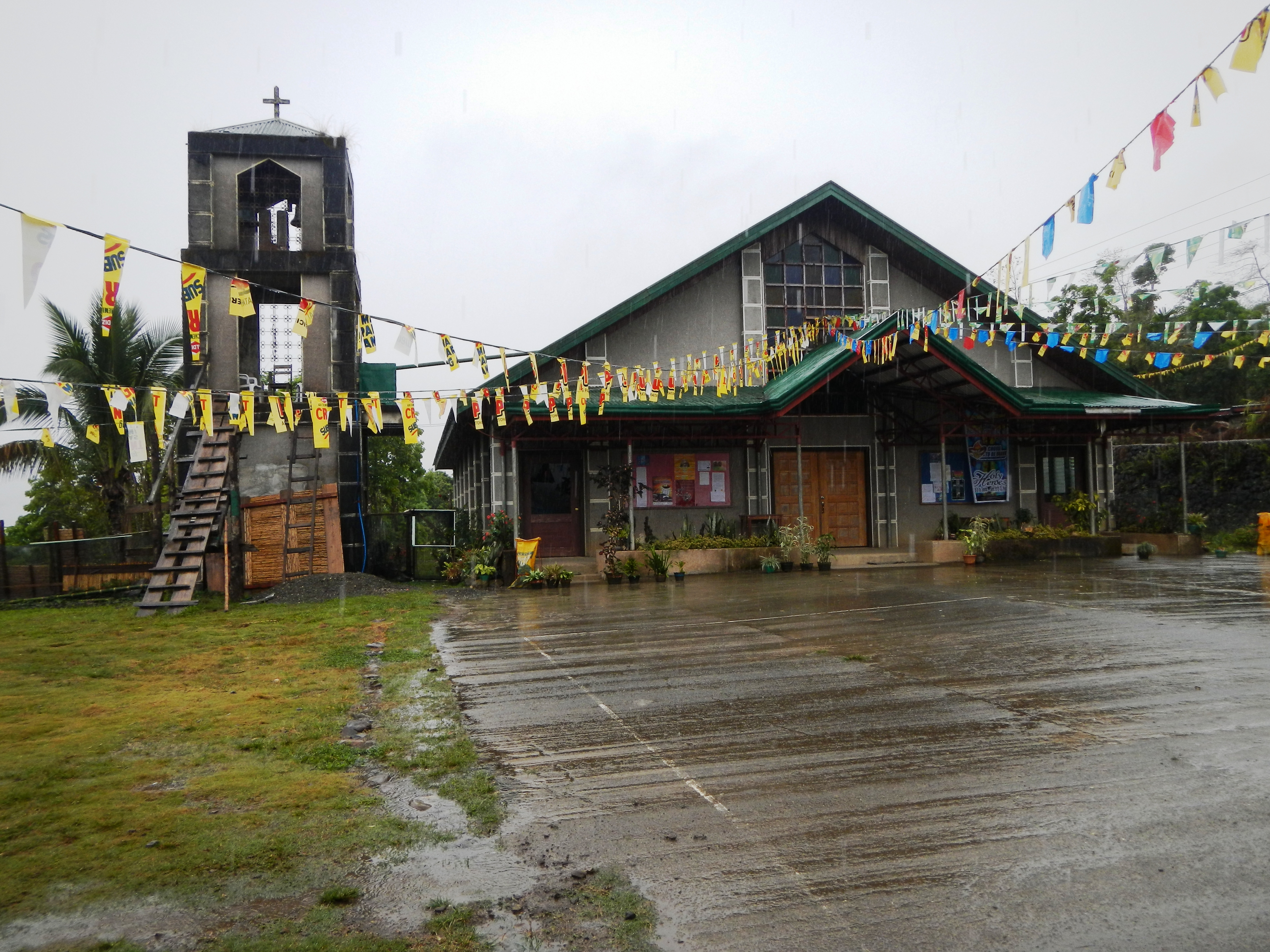

== See also ==
- OceanaGold
