= Leonardo B. Perez =

Filipino politician

The Honorable Leonardo B. Perez
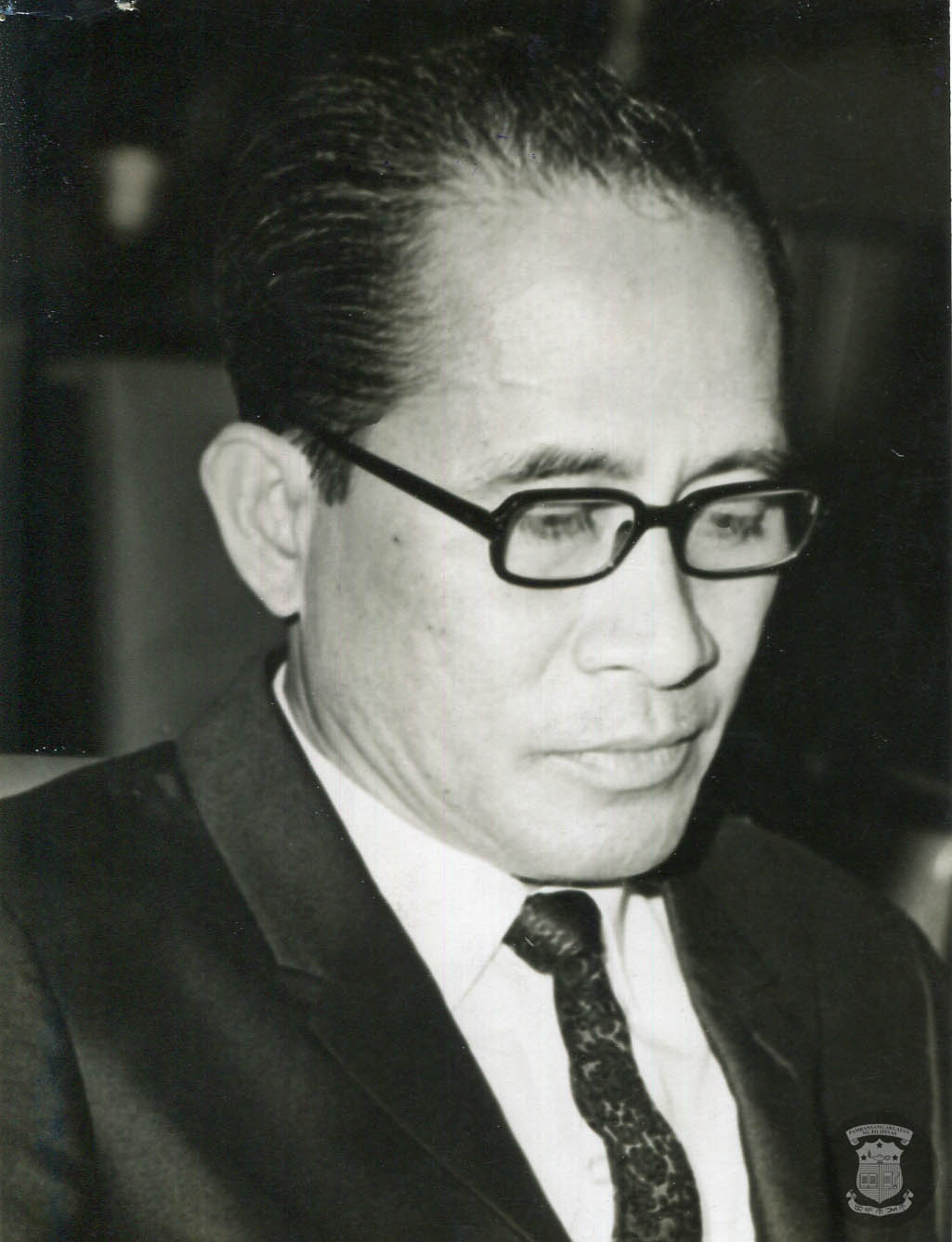

Senator of the Philippines
- In office December 30, 1967 – September 23, 1972

Member of the Philippine House of Representatives from Nueva Vizcaya's lone district
- In office June 30, 1992 – June 30, 1995
- Preceded by: Carlos Padilla
- Succeeded by: Carlos Padilla
- In office July 23, 1984 – March 25, 1986
- Preceded by: District reestablished
- Succeeded by: Carlos Padilla
- In office December 30, 1953 – December 30, 1967
- Preceded by: León Cabarroguis
- Succeeded by: Benjamin B. Perez

Chairman of the Commission on Elections
- In office May 29, 1973 – May 17, 1980
- Appointed by: Ferdinand Marcos
- Preceded by: Jaime Ferrer
- Succeeded by: Vicente Santiago Jr.

Personal details
- Born: Leonardo Balagot Perez; November 22, 1925 Bauang, La Union, Philippine Islands
- Died: June 16, 2007 (aged 81) Quezon City, Philippines
- Party: NPC (1992-1995)
- Other political affiliations: KBL (1984-1986); Nacionalista (1953-1972)
- Education: University of the Philippines
- Awards: Purple Heart

Leonardo Balagot Perez (November 22, 1925 – June 16, 2007) was a Filipino politician who served as a member of the Philippine House of Representatives on behalf of the province of Nueva Vizcaya. He was a member of the Senate of the Philippines, and served in the cabinet of President Ferdinand Marcos.

== Early life ==
Leonardo Perez was born on November 22, 1925, in barangay Paringao in Bauang, La Union. He was the eldest of five children of Mariano Perez and Juliana Balagot. At a young age, Perez moved with his family to Nueva Vizcaya, where he completed his primary and secondary education. During the Second World War, Perez was active in the underground resistance. He gathered intelligence and was involved in the construction of an airstrip in Ifugao for the supply of ammunition. He was wounded during the Battle of Hapid in Kiangan and was later awarded the Purple Heart. After the war he studied law at the University of the Philippines, graduating cum laude in 1951.

== Career ==
=== Third Republic ===
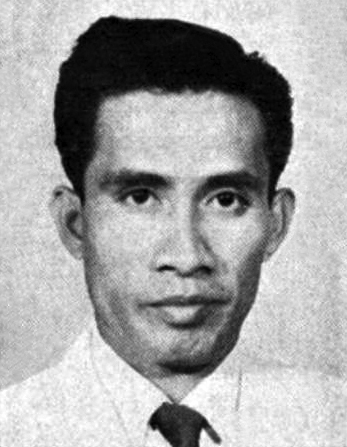
Perez official portrait during the 3rd Congress.

Perez served as Secretary of the Provincial Board of Nueva Vizcaya from 1952 to 1953. In 1953, he was elected as delegate of Nueva Vizcaya to the House of Representatives. He was re-elected in subsequent elections in 1957, 1961 and 1965. During the 1965 elections, Perez was also the official spokesman for Ferdinand Marcos during the latter's successful presidential election campaign against Diosdado Macapagal. From 1966 to 1967, he served as First Assistant Majority Floor Leader of the House. During his congressional career, he served as Chairman of the Committees on Anti-Filipino Activities, and Privileges and Election Law and authored Republic Act 4735, which established the municipality of Ambaguio from the provincial capital of Bayombong, in 1966.

In 1967, Perez was elected to the Senate of the Philippines, where he served as the Chairman of the Committee on National Defense and Security and the Vice Chairman of the Committees on Investigation (Blue Ribbon) and National Minorities, and authored Republic Act No. 6388, otherwise known as “the Election Code of 1971”. He also authored Republic Act 6394, allowing for the separation of six municipalities of Nueva Vizcaya to create the province of Quirino in 1971, and sponsored Republic Acts 6372 which split the town of Dupax in Nueva Vizcaya into two municipalities, namely Dupax del Norte and Dupax del Sur. However, his term ended prematurely when Congress was closed in 1972 by Marcos, shortly after the declaration of martial law.

=== Under Martial Law ===
In February 1973, Perez was appointed presidential troubleshooter and in May he was appointed chairman of the Commission on Elections (COMELEC). During his tenure, he oversaw several electoral exercises during the Martial Law era such as the July 1973 constitutional referendum, the 1975 presidential referendum, the 1976 constitutional referendum, the 1977 presidential referendum, and the 1978 elections for the Interim Batasang Pambansa. In 1980, he retired as chairman after completing his term.

Perez joined Marcos' cabinet from 1981 to 1984 as Presidential Adviser on Political Affairs and was therefore a concurrent member of the Interim Batasang Pambansa. In 1984, he was elected to the Regular Batasang Pambansa representing Nueva Vizcaya after a bitterly disputed campaign marred by allegations of fraud. He served until the dissolution of the body in 1986 following Marcos' fall in the EDSA Revolution.

=== Fifth Republic ===
In 1987, Perez ran again for the Senate as a candidate of Marcos' Kilusang Bagong Lipunan party in elections held in May but lost.

Perez returned as elected representative of Nueva Vizcaya in the House of Representatives in the 1992 elections. Among his notable legislation during that time was his successful lobbying for the renationalization of the Nueva Vizcaya Provincial Hospital in Bayombong in March 1995 and its renaming as the Veterans Regional Hospital. After the end of his term in June 1995, he retired from politics.

== Personal life and death ==
Perez died at the National Kidney and Transplant Institute on June 16, 2007 at the age of 81 from kidney disease.

Perez' brother, Benjamin, served as Congressman of Nueva Vizcaya from 1969 to 1972 and was elected as an Assemblyman for Region II (Cagayan Valley) in the Interim Batasang Pambansa from 1978 to 1984. His son, Leonardo Jr., became a member of the Nueva Vizcaya Provincial Board and ran unsuccessfully for Vice Governor in 1998 and Governor in 2004.
