= Dupax =

Former municipality in Nueva Vizcaya, Philippines

Coordinates: 16.2969°N 121.1002°E

Dupax, officially the Municipality of Dupax, was a municipality in the province of Nueva Vizcaya, Philippines. Founded during the Spanish era, it was divided into Dupax del Norte and Dupax del Sur in 1971.

== Etymology ==
The name Dupax came from the Isinay word dopaj which means 'to lie down in complete relaxation and rest', the thing the natives wanted to do, upon repairing their camp and eating their catch, after hunting in the forest and before going homes.

Prior to the establishment of Dupax, the site of what would be its town proper served as a camp for hunters from surrounding tribal settlements.

The area, either a plain or a valley, was located near their hunting grounds, and became their settlement as the town of Dopaj. After the Spanish arrived, the name was spelled as Dupax due to the Spanish orthography of the time.

== History ==
The town of Dupax was discovered by Spaniards under Luis Pérez Dasmariñas in 1591. In 1609, a mission was established by the Dominicans, but was later abandoned due to territorial disputes with the Franciscans.

In 1717, Fr. Alejandro Cacho arrived in Dupax and established Christian communities. In 1726, Spanish Augustinian missionaries arrived in the locality. On April 22, 1731, Dupax was formally founded by Fr. Nicolas Norbantes and Fr. Agustin San Juan.

In the early 18th century, Dupax was inhabited by four tribal groups. The Caraos from Benguet lived with the Isinays, the town's first inhabitants, in the present territory. The other two were the Mala-ats and the Bugkalots. The Mala-ats were subsequently forced to migrate to the hinterlands as ethnic groups from other provinces, especially the Ilocanos, Igorots, Ifugaos, arrived before and after the turn of the century.

The original town of Dupax was the largest municipality of Nueva Vizcaya in terms of land area. The first head of the town, was Mandalito, an Ilongot. Eventually three prominent mem representing the three tribal districts were appointed, namely: Dayag, who headed the Mala-ats; Tiun Pising, who headed the Igorots, and Bartolo, who headed the Ilongots.

As early as 1928, during the term of mayor Inocencio Suson, attempts were made to transfer the seat to Barrio Malasin. The plan was eventually realized with a law authored by Representative Leonardo B. Perez. By virtue of Republic Act (RA) No. 1181 approved on June 20, 1954, the seat of government was transferred from the old poblacion to Malasin.

== Disestablishment ==
In the 1970s, Dupax was divided into three separate municipalities: Dupax del Norte and Dupax del Sur in 1971, and Alfonso Castañeda in 1979. RA No. 6372, sponsored by Representative Benjamin Perez and Senator Leonardo Perez, was approved on August 16, 1971, dividing Dupax into two new municipalities: Dupax del Norte and Dupax del Sur, which would consist the old poblacion of Dupax, designated as the seat of government, nine barrios and fifteen sitios. The creation of this municipality was ratified in a plebiscite held on November 8, 1971; the division was implemented through Presidential Decree No. 586 promulgated by President Ferdinand Marcos on November 20, 1974. The town's final mayor was Carlos Padilla.

The third municipality carved out of the old Dupax municipality was Alfonso Castañeda, which was created in 1979 through Batas Pambansa Blg. 27. The law, which was approved by President Marcos, established the municipality after the separation of two barangays – including Lublub which was designated its seat of government – and seven sitios from Dupax del Sur, along with some parts of Dupax del Norte.
