= Legislative districts of Nueva Vizcaya =

Legislative district of the Philippines

The legislative districts of Nueva Vizcaya are the representations of the province of Nueva Vizcaya in the various national legislatures of the Philippines. The province is currently represented in the lower house of the Congress of the Philippines through its lone congressional district.

== History ==
Nueva Vizcaya had its first own representation in the Malolos Congress from 1898 to 1899, wherein it returned two delegates. Its representation was restored in 1916, ahead of the Philippine Assembly that commenced in 1917. It included the present-day Quirino Province until 1973. From 1978 to 1984, it was part of the representation of Region II, and since 1984 it has been represented on its own.

== Current districts ==
Legislative Districts and Congressional Representatives of Nueva Vizcaya
District	Current Representative	Party	Population (2020)	Area
Lone	Timothy Joseph Cayton (since 2025); Dupax del Norte	PFP	497,432	3,975.67 km^{2}

== See also ==
- Legislative district of Quirino
