= Tim Cayton =

Filipino lawyer and politician

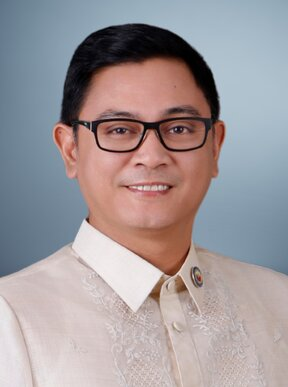
- Official portrait, 2026

Member of the Philippine House of Representatives from Nueva Vizcaya's Lone District
- Incumbent
- Assumed office June 30, 2025
- Preceded by: Luisa Cuaresma

Mayor of Dupax del Norte
- In office June 30, 2016 – June 30, 2025
- Vice Mayor: Victorino Prado Jr. (2016–2019, 2022–2025); Frederick Padilla (2019–2022)
- Preceded by: Antonio Palugod
- Succeeded by: Paolo Cayton

Member of the Dupax del Norte Municipal Council
- In office June 30, 2013 – June 30, 2016

Personal details
- Party: PFP (2026–present)
- Other political affiliations: Aksyon (2024–2026); Lakas (2021–2024); NUP (2018–2021); Independent (2012–2018)
- Education: Colegio de San Juan de Letran (AB); San Sebastian College – Recoletos (LLB)
- Awards: Most Outstanding Mayor of the Philippines (2023)

Timothy "Tim" Joseph Estonilo Cayton is a Filipino lawyer and politician who is a member of the House of Representatives of the Philippines since 2025, representing the lone district of Nueva Vizcaya. He previously served as the mayor of Dupax del Norte, Nueva Vizcaya for three terms from 2016 to 2025. He was awarded as the “Most Outstanding Mayor of the Philippines” in 2023.

== Electoral history ==
Electoral history of Tim Cayton
Election Year	Position	Party	Votes for Cayton				Result
Election Year	Position	Party	Total	%	Plc.	Swing	Result
2013	Councilor of Dupax del Norte	Independent	6,256	—	1st	—N/a	Won
2016	Mayor of Dupax del Norte	Independent	5,970	—	1st	—N/a	Won
2019	Mayor of Dupax del Norte	NUP	8,229	—	1st	—N/a	Won
2022	Mayor of Dupax del Norte	Lakas	13,902	92.34%	1st	—N/a	Won
2025	Representative (Nueva Vizcaya)	Aksyon	100,291	40.52%	1st	—N/a	Won
