= 2022 Nueva Vizcaya local elections =

Part of 2022 Philippine general election

- 9 May 2022
- Gubernatorial election
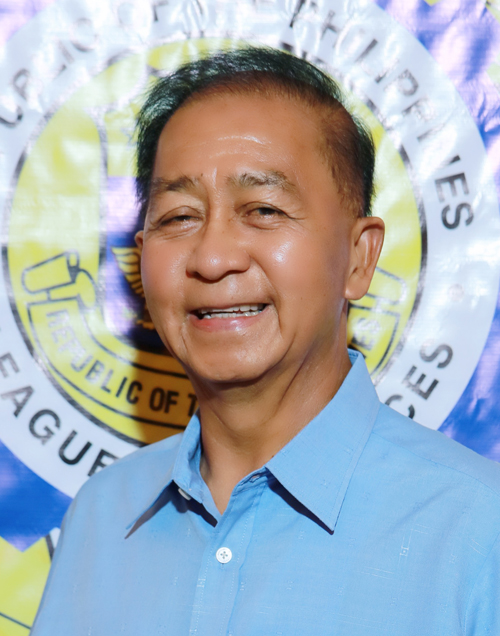

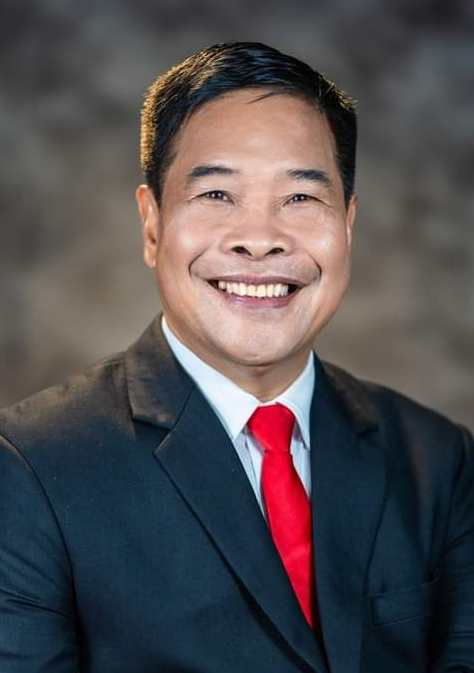
Candidate	Carlos Padilla	Jose Tomas Sr.
Party	Nacionalista	PRP
Alliance	Team Caloy	Team Cares
Running mate	Lamberto Galima	Jose Gambito
Popular vote	143,552	97,774
Percentage	59.48%	40.52%
Governor before election
Carlos Padilla
Nacionalista
Elected Governor
Carlos Padilla
Nacionalista
- Vice Gubernatorial election
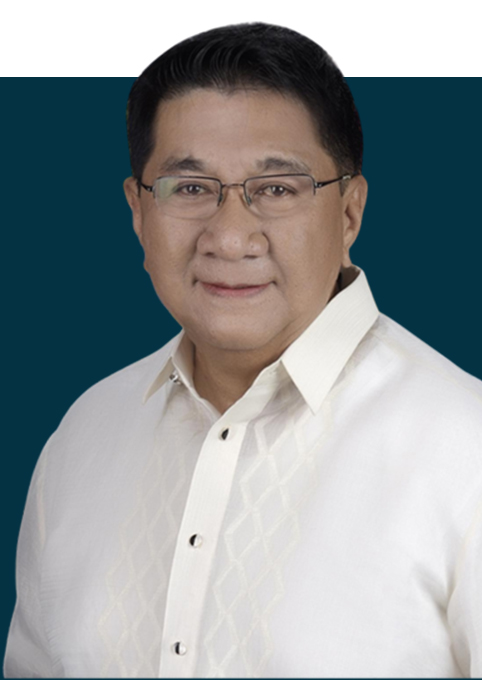
		NP
Candidate	Jose Gambito	Lamberto Galima
Party	Lakas	Nacionalista
Alliance	Team Cares	Team Caloy
Popular vote	123,079	101,664
Percentage	54.76%	45.24%
Vice Governor before election
Jose Tomas Sr.
NUP
Elected Vice Governor
Jose Gambito
Lakas
- Provincial Board election

10 seats in the Nueva Vizcaya Provincial Board 6 seats needed for a majority
	First party	Second party	Third party
	NP	LAKAS	AKSYON
Party	Nacionalista	Lakas	Aksyon
Alliance	Team Caloy	Team Cares	Team Cares
Last election	6 seats, 52.71%	Did not participate	Did not participate
Seats won	4	4	1
Seat change	▼2	▲4	▲1
Popular vote	425,786	324,016	55,858
Percentage	45.46%	34.59%	5.96%
	Fourth party	Fifth party	Sixth party
	PFP	PRP	AKSYON
Party	PFP	PRP	Aksyon
Alliance	Team Cares	Team Cares
Last election	0 seats, 0.73%	Did not participate	Did not participate
Seats won	1	0	0
Seat change	▲1	0	0
Popular vote	49,210	23,691	5,918
Percentage	5.25%	2.53%	0.63%
	Seventh party
	IND
Party	Independent
Last election	0 seat, 2.60%
Seats won	0
Seat change	0
Popular vote	52,125
Percentage	5.57%

Local elections were held in the province of Nueva Vizcaya on May 9, 2022, as part of the Philippine general election. Voters selected candidates for all Local positions: a Municipal Mayor, Municipal Vice Mayor and Municipal Councilors, as well as Members of the Sangguniang Panlalawigan, the Governor, the Vice Governor, and a Representative for the lone district of Nueva Vizcaya to the House of Representatives. Those elected took their respective offices on June 30, 2022, for a three-year term. 252,486 of 296,233 registered voters voted in this election.

Incumbent Governor Carlos Padilla was re-elected for his third and final term, while former Vice Governor Jose Gambito successfully reclaimed his former seat. Incumbent Representative Luisa Lloren–Cuaresma also won her third and final term for Congress.

== Coalitions ==
As the Governor, Vice Governor, and Member of the House of Representatives and Members of the Provincial Board are elected on the same ballot, Gubernatorial candidates may present a slate of candidates for each position per District within the Province.

=== Administration coalition ===
Team Caloy (Agtultuloy iti Progreso)
#	Name	Party	Result
For Representative
lone district
2	Flodemonte Gerdan	Nacionalista	Lost
For Governor
1	Carlos Padilla	Nacionalista	Won
For Vice Governor
1	Epifanio Lamberto Galima	Nacionalista	Lost
For Board Member
1st district
2	Leonard Clemens Cadoy	Nacionalista	Lost
6	Arnel Hernandez	Nacionalista	Lost
9	Teodorico Padilla Jr.	Nacionalista	Lost
10	Elma Pinao-an–Lejao	Nacionalista	Won
11	Delbert Tidang	Nacionalista	Won
2nd district
5	Patricio Dumlao Jr.	Nacionalista	Won
7	Eunice Galima–Gambol	Nacionalista	Won
10	Victor Gines Jr.	Nacionalista	Lost
11	Johnny Liban	Nacionalista	Lost
15	Wilson Salas	Nacionalista	Lost

=== Opposition coalition ===
Team Cares (Tropang May Puso)
#	Name	Party	Result
For Representative
lone district
1	Luisa Cuaresma	Lakas	Won
For Governor
2	Jose Tomas Sr.	PRP	Lost
For Vice Governor
2	Jose Gambito	Lakas	Won
For Board Member
1st district
1	Edgardo Balgos	Lakas	Won
4	Edgar Daniel Jr.	Lakas	Lost
5	Florante Gerdan	Aksyon	Won
7	Pablo Kindot	Lakas	Won
8	Benjamin Lucas Jr.	Lakas	Lost
2nd district
3	Roland Carub	Lakas	Won
4	Eufemia Dacayo	Lakas	Won
8	Rolando Galvez	PRP	Lost
9	Policario Garing Jr.	Lakas	Lost
12	Primo Percival Marcos	PFP	Won

== Gubernatorial election ==
The incumbent Governor is Carlos Padilla, who was re-elected in 2019 election with 58.03% (115,367 votes) of the total votes counted.

Padilla is running for his third and final consecutive term. Padilla was nominated by the Nacionalista Party, his sole and main opponent is the incumbent Vice Governor Jose "Tam-an" Tomas Sr., who is running under the People's Reform Party (PRP). Padilla made a slate, the Team Caloy (Agtultuloy iti Progreso), while Tomas Sr. also made his slate the Team Cares (Tropang May Puso).

=== Results ===
Padilla won his third consecutive term by a landslide victory over Tomas. Padilla won 12 of the 15 towns of the whole province.

Candidate	Party	Votes	%
Carlos Padilla	Nacionalista Party	143,552	59.48
Jose; Tomas Sr.	People's Reform Party	97,774	40.52
Total		241,326	100.00
Valid votes		241,326	95.58
Invalid/blank votes		11,160	4.42
Total votes		252,486	100.00
Registered voters/turnout		296,233	85.23
Nacionalista hold			

==== Results per municipality ====
Municipality	Padilla		Tomas Sr.		Source
Municipality	Votes	%	Votes	%	Source
Alfonso Castañeda	3,156	68.40	1,458	31.60	
Ambaguio	1,961	31.53	4,259	68.47	
Aritao	11,281	59.95	7,537	40.05	
Bagabag	12,116	66.91	5,991	33.09	
Bambang	15,166	55.08	12,368	44.92	
Bayombong	22,229	69.31	9,841	30.69	
Diadi	5,136	54.59	4,272	45.41	
Dupax del Norte	9,287	61.31	5,860	38.69	
Dupax del Sur	6,411	56.66	4,903	43.34	
Kasibu	8,437	44.34	10,593	55.66	
Kayapa	3,748	28.70	9,312	71.30	
Quezon	7,391	58.71	5,199	41.29	
Santa Fe	5,611	53.94	4,792	46.06	
Solano	24,604	74.27	8,524	25.73	
Villaverde	7,018	71.01	2,865	28.99	
TOTAL	143,552	59.48	97,774	40.52	

== Vice Gubernatorial election ==
The outgoing Vice Governor was Jose "Tam-an" Tomas Sr., who was elected in 2019 election with 51.76% (98,846 votes) of the total votes counted.

Tomas did not for re-election, instead he chose to run for the Governorship, facing re-electionist Governor Carlos Padilla. The Team Cares of Tomas Sr., nominated former Vice Governor Jose Gambito who ran under Lakas–CMD (Lakas), Gambito's sole and main opponent was Epifanio Lamberto Galima, who also served as Vice Governor of the same province. In 2019, Galima and Tomas Sr. also fought for the Vice Governorship, but Galima narrowly lost his re-election bid to Jose "Tam-an" Tomas Sr.

=== Results ===
Gambito narrowly won his bid to reclaim his former position over Galima. Gambito won 12 of the 15 municipalities of the province.

Candidate	Party	Votes	%
Jose Gambito	Lakas–CMD	123,079	54.76
Lamberto Galima	Nacionalista Party	101,664	45.24
Total		224,743	100.00
Valid votes		224,743	89.01
Invalid/blank votes		27,743	10.99
Total votes		252,486	100.00
Registered voters/turnout		296,233	85.23
Lakas hold			

==== Results per municipality ====
Municipality	Gambito		Galima		Source
Municipality	Votes	%	Votes	%	Source
Alfonso Castañeda	1,681	42.02	2,319	57.98	
Ambaguio	4,140	72.20	1,594	27.80	
Aritao	9,576	56.42	7,396	43.58	
Bagabag	8,692	51.86	8,067	48.14	
Bambang	15,706	60.69	10,171	39.31	
Bayombong	16,820	54.85	13,843	45.15	
Diadi	4,967	57.51	3,670	42.49	
Dupax del Norte	8,377	59.63	5,671	40.37	
Dupax del Sur	6,165	59.56	4,186	40.44	
Kasibu	9,815	56.62	7,519	43.38	
Kayapa	8,946	74.80	3,014	25.20	
Quezon	6,657	56.78	5,068	43.22	
Santa Fe	4,897	52.07	4,508	47.93	
Solano	12,612	39.43	19,376	60.57	
Villaverde	4,028	43.36	5,262	56.64	
TOTAL	123,079	54.76	101,664	45.24	

== Congressional election ==
2022 Nueva Vizcaya's lone congressional district election
		NP
Candidate	Luisa Cuaresma	Flodemonte Gerdan
Party	Lakas	Nacionalista
Alliance	Team Cares	Team Caloy
Popular vote	165,360	62,115
Percentage	72.25%	27.14%
Representative before election
Luisa Cuaresma
NUP
Elected Representative
Luisa Cuaresma
Lakas

The outgoing Representative was Luisa Lloren–Cuaresma, who was re-elected in 2019 election with 56.08% (114,338 votes) of the total votes counted.

Cuaresma ran for her third and final consecutive term for Congress. Cuaresma was the candidate of the Opposition's slate the Team Cares, Cuaresma ran under Lakas–CMD (Lakas). Cuaresma's main opponent was incumbent Board Member Flodemonte Gerdan, who ran under the slate of the Administration (Team Caloy). Lawrence Santa Ana was also a candidate, running as an independent.

=== Results ===
Cuaresma won her re-election bid, beating Gerdan in a landslide victory.

Candidate	Party	Votes	%
Luisa Cuaresma	Lakas–CMD	165,360	72.25
Flodemonte Gerdan	Nacionalista Party	62,115	27.14
Lawrence Santa Ana	Independent	1,388	0.61
Total		228,863	100.00
Valid votes		228,863	90.64
Invalid/blank votes		23,623	9.36
Total votes		252,486	100.00
Registered voters/turnout		296,233	85.23
Lakas hold			

==== Results per municipality ====
Municipality	Cuaresma		Gerdan		Santa Ana		Source
Municipality	Votes	%	Votes	%	Votes	%	Source
Alfonso Castañeda	2,173	55.11	1,716	43.52	54	1.37	
Ambaguio	4,308	72.76	1,592	26.89	21	0.35	
Aritao	14,537	81.20	3,288	18.37	77	0.43	
Bagabag	13,379	79.21	3,380	20.01	132	0.78	
Bambang	22,488	82.59	4,635	17.02	107	0.39	
Bayombong	21,359	69.83	8,960	29.29	268	0.88	
Diadi	6,138	69.60	2,638	29.91	43	0.49	
Dupax del Norte	11,151	77.38	3,220	22.35	39	0.27	
Dupax del Sur	7,930	74.33	2,698	25.29	41	0.38	
Kasibu	10,577	60.55	6,785	38.84	107	0.61	
Kayapa	9,801	77.52	2,806	22.19	37	0.29	
Quezon	8,364	70.84	3,365	28.50	78	0.66	
Santa Fe	4,928	50.23	4,848	49.41	35	0.36	
Solano	22,303	71.04	8,800	28.03	294	0.94	
Villaverde	5,924	63.27	3,384	36.14	55	0.59	
TOTAL	165,360	72.25	62,115	27.14	1,388	0.61	

== Provincial Board election ==
Unlike in the Congressional election, the Provincial Board has two Provincial districts, which is comprised by five Board Member for each Provincial district.

Party or alliance		Votes	%	Seats
Team Cares	Lakas	324,016	34.59	4
Team Cares	Aksyon	55,858	5.96	1
Team Cares	PFP	49,210	5.25	1
Team Cares	PRP	23,691	2.53	0
Team Cares	Total	452,775	48.34	6
Nacionalista		425,786	45.46	4
Aksyon		5,918	0.63	0
Independent		52,125	5.57	0
Ex officio seats				4
Total		936,604	100.00	14
Total votes		1,262,430	–	

- Note: All incumbents are marked in Italics.

=== 1st District ===
- Municipalities: Alfonso Castañeda, Aritao, Bambang, Dupax del Norte, Dupax del Sur, Kasibu, Kayapa, Santa Fe

1st District Provincial Board election
Party	Candidate	Votes	%
Lakas	Edgardo Balgos	69,100	15.35
Aksyon	Florante Gerdan	55,858	12.41
Nacionalista	Delbert Tidang	55,392	12.31
Nacionalista	Elma Pinao-an–Lejao	52,344	11.63
Lakas	Pablo Kindot	47,804	10.62
Nacionalista	Leonard Cadoy	36,341	8.08
Nacionalista	Arnel Hernandez	34,130	7.58
Lakas	Edgar Daniel Jr.	33,476	7.44
Lakas	Benjamin Lucas Jr.	31,940	7.10
Nacionalista	Teodorico Padilla Jr.	27,729	6.16
Aksyon	Carlita Cudiaman	5,918	1.32
Valid ballots		418,092	66.43
Invalid or blank votes		211,238	33.57
Total votes		629,330	100.00

=== 2nd District ===
- Municipalities: Ambaguio, Bagabag, Bayombong, Diadi, Quezon, Solano, Villaverde

2nd District Provincial Board election
Party	Candidate	Votes	%
Lakas	Eufemia Dacayo	74,582	15.33
Nacionalista	Patricio Dumlao Jr.	66,421	13.65
Nacionalista	Eunice Galima–Gambol	58,647	12.05
PFP	Primo Percival Marcos	49,210	10.11
Lakas	Roland Carub	43,525	8.95
Nacionalista	Wilson Salas	33,481	6.88
Nacionalista	Victor Gines Jr.	31,846	6.54
Nacionalista	Johnny Liban	29,455	6.05
PRP	Ronaldo Galvez	23,691	4.87
Lakas	Policarpio Garing Jr.	23,589	4.85
Independent	Victor Galingayan	22,024	4.53
Independent	Jose Evangelista	19,046	3.91
Independent	Jayferly Padilla	6,949	1.43
Independent	Evelyn Milagros Ramel	2,186	0.45
Independent	Carlito Abarquez	1,920	0.39
Valid ballots		486,572	76.86
Invalid or blank votes		146,528	23.14
Total votes		633,100	100.00

== Municipal elections ==
All municipalities of Nueva Vizcaya elected a Mayor and a Vice Mayor in the election. The candidates for Mayor and Vice Mayor with the highest number of votes wins the seat; they are voted separately. Therefore, they may be of different parties when elected. Below is the list of mayoralty candidates of each municipalities per district.

- Note: All incumbents are marked in Italics.

=== 1st District ===
- Municipalities: Alfonso Castañeda, Aritao, Bambang, Dupax del Norte, Dupax del Sur, Kasibu, Kayapa, Santa Fe

==== Alfonso Castañeda ====
Alfonso Castañeda mayoralty election
Party	Candidate	Votes	%
Lakas	Wilson Capia-ao	1,929	40.18
Nacionalista	Myrna Pasigian	1,577	32.85
PPM	Jong Baytic	1,295	26.97
Total votes		4,801	100.00
Lakas hold			

Alfonso Castañeda vice mayoralty election
Party	Candidate	Votes	%
Lakas	Belen Huerta	1,745	37.16
Nacionalista	Boyet Castillo	1,691	36.01
PPM	Daniel Pasigian	1,260	26.83
Total votes		4,696	100.00
Lakas hold			

==== Aritao ====
Aritao mayoralty election
Party	Candidate	Votes	%
Lakas	Remelyn Peros	11,234	58.32
Nacionalista	Ruben Sayo	8,038	41.68
Total votes		19,262	100.00
Lakas hold			

Aritao vice mayoralty election
Party	Candidate	Votes	%
Lakas	Jayson Ferrer	8,482	46.21
Nacionalista	Caloy Quezon	7,577	41.28
Independent	David Acenas	2,297	12.51
Total votes		18,356	100.00
Lakas gain from Nacionalista			

==== Bambang ====
Bambang mayoralty election
Party	Candidate	Votes	%
Lakas	Jaime Cuaresma	14,152	51.04
Nacionalista	Ping Balgos	10,226	36.88
Independent	Ricardo Bonus	3,348	12.08
Total votes		27,726	100.00
Lakas gain from Nacionalista			

Bambang vice mayoralty election
Party	Candidate	Votes	%
Lakas	Arnel Duldulao	13,747	51.70
Nacionalista	Juan Karlo Talingdan II	12,843	48.30
Total votes		26,590	100.00
Lakas gain from Independent			

==== Dupax del Norte ====
Dupax del Norte mayoralty election
Party	Candidate	Votes	%
Lakas	Tim Cayton	13,902	92.34
Nacionalista	Rene Tanjusay	1,154	7.66
Total votes		15,056	100.00
Lakas hold			

Dupax del Norte vice mayoralty election
Party	Candidate	Votes	%
Lakas	Vic Prado	7,712	51.38
Nacionalista	Frederick Padilla	7,299	48.62
Total votes		15,011	100.00
Lakas gain from Nacionalista			

==== Dupax del Sur ====
Dupax del Sur mayoralty election
Party	Candidate	Votes	%
Nacionalista	Niel Magaway	7,313	65.27
Lakas	Luis Binay-an	3,891	34.73
Total votes		11,204	100.00
Nacionalista hold			

Dupax del Sur vice mayoralty election
Party	Candidate	Votes	%
Nacionalista	Ruben Basconcillo Jr.	5,722	50.80
Lakas	Michael Donguis	5,542	49.20
Total votes		11,264	100.00
Nacionalista hold			

==== Kasibu ====
Kasibu mayoralty election
Party	Candidate	Votes	%
Nacionalista	Romeo Tabayan	16,738	100.00
Valid ballots		16,738	85.09
Invalid or blank votes		2,932	14.91
Total votes		19,670	100.00
Nacionalista hold			

Kasibu vice mayoralty election
Party	Candidate	Votes	%
Nacionalista	Alberto Bumolo Jr.	16,893	100.00
Valid ballots		16,893	85.88
Invalid or blank votes		2,777	14.12
Total votes		19,670	100.00
Nacionalista hold			

==== Kayapa ====
Kayapa mayoralty election
Party	Candidate	Votes	%
Lakas	Elizabeth Balasya	8,728	65.56
Nacionalista	Oscar Camantiles	4,585	34.44
Total votes		13,313	100.00
Lakas hold			

Kayapa vice mayoralty election
Party	Candidate	Votes	%
Nacionalista	Peter Bay-an	6,830	52.47
Lakas	Carlito Bantayan	6,186	47.53
Total votes		13,016	100.00
Nacionalista hold			

==== Santa Fe ====
Santa Fe mayoralty election
Party	Candidate	Votes	%
Nacionalista	Liwayway Caramat	5,426	50.94
Lakas	Tidong Benito	5,226	49.06
Total votes		10,652	100.00
Nacionalista gain from Lakas			

Santa Fe vice mayoralty election
Party	Candidate	Votes	%
Nacionalista	Jonathan Tindaan	6,157	59.22
Lakas	Floter Gerdan	4,239	40.78
Total votes		10,396	100.00
Nacionalista hold			

=== 2nd District ===
- Municipalities: Ambaguio, Bagabag, Bayombong, Diadi, Quezon, Solano, Villaverde

==== Ambaguio ====
Ambaguio mayoralty election
Party	Candidate	Votes	%
Lakas	O'nel Danao	4,103	65.75
Nacionalista	Roy Miñas	2,137	34.25
Total votes		6,240	100.00
Lakas gain from Nacionalista			

Ambaguio vice mayoralty election
Party	Candidate	Votes	%
Lakas	Leon Lino	3,154	51.12
Nacionalista	Arnold Dinungon	3,016	48.88
Total votes		6,170	100.00
Lakas gain from NUP			

==== Bagabag ====
Bagabag mayoralty election
Party	Candidate	Votes	%
PFP	Benigno Calauad	7,920	43.25
Lakas	Gracia Sevillena	7,171	39.16
Nacionalista	Nestor Sevillena	3,190	17.42
Independent	Jun Tannagan	33	0.18
Total votes		18,314	100.00
PFP gain from Independent			

Bagabag vice mayoralty election
Party	Candidate	Votes	%
Lakas	Johnny Sevillena	10,118	56.91
PFP	Eulogio Dela Cueva	7,662	43.09
Total votes		17,780	100.00
Lakas gain from Independent			

==== Bayombong ====
Bayombong mayoralty election
Party	Candidate	Votes	%
Nacionalista	Tony Bagasao	17,141	54.29
PFP	Ralph Lantion	14,441	45.71
Total votes		31,592	100.00
Nacionalista gain from NPC			

Bayombong vice mayoralty election
Party	Candidate	Votes	%
Nacionalista	Ramon Cabauatan Jr.	14,415	45.80
PFP	Andy De Guzman	10,375	32.96
Independent	Elizabeth Tugab	5,345	16.98
Independent	Peng Navarro	1,340	4.26
Total votes		31,475	100.00
Nacionalista hold			

==== Diadi ====
Diadi mayoralty election
Party	Candidate	Votes	%
Nacionalista	Sandy Gayaton	5,615	58.94
Lakas	Norma Miguel	3,912	41.06
Total votes		9,527	100.00
Nacionalista hold			

Diadi vice mayoralty election
Party	Candidate	Votes	%
Nacionalista	Rolito Dulnuan	6,390	68.67
Lakas	Jumil Magno	2,916	31.33
Total votes		9,306	100.00
Nacionalista gain from NUP			

==== Quezon ====
Quezon mayoralty election
Party	Candidate	Votes	%
Nacionalista	Dolores Binwag	8,678	69.31
Lakas	Aurelio Salunat	3,842	30.69
Total votes		12,520	100.00
Nacionalista hold			

Quezon vice mayoralty election
Party	Candidate	Votes	%
Nacionalista	Amor Dincog	5,288	42.20
Aksyon	Reynante Jose	4,038	32.22
PFP	Romualyn Madalipay	3,205	25.58
Total votes		12,531	100.00
Nacionalista hold			

==== Solano ====
Solano mayoralty election
Party	Candidate	Votes	%
Lakas	Philip Dacayo	18,174	54.82
Nacionalista	Pedro Algeria Sr.	11,664	35.18
Independent	Topac Santos	3,316	10.00
Total votes		33,154	100.00
Lakas hold			

Solano vice mayoralty election
Party	Candidate	Votes	%
Lakas	Eddy Tiongson	11,602	36.22
Nacionalista	Joseph Alindada	9,492	29.63
Independent	Maclit Collado	8,574	26.77
Independent	Alejandro Danguilan	2,364	7.38
Total votes		32,032	100.00
Lakas hold			

==== Villaverde ====
Villaverde mayoralty election
Party	Candidate	Votes	%
Lakas	Ronelie Valtoribio	5,278	53.17
Nacionalista	Willy Tugangui	4,648	46.83
Total votes		9,926	100.00
Lakas gain from NUP			

Villaverde vice mayoralty election
Party	Candidate	Votes	%
PFP	Kajong Acosta	5,433	55.93
Nacionalista	Colet Alaman–Guinasao	4,281	44.07
Total votes		9,714	100.00
PFP hold			
