= Santa Fe, Nueva Vizcaya =

Municipality in Nueva Vizcaya, Philippines

Santa Fe Imugan
- Municipality
- Municipality of Santa Fe
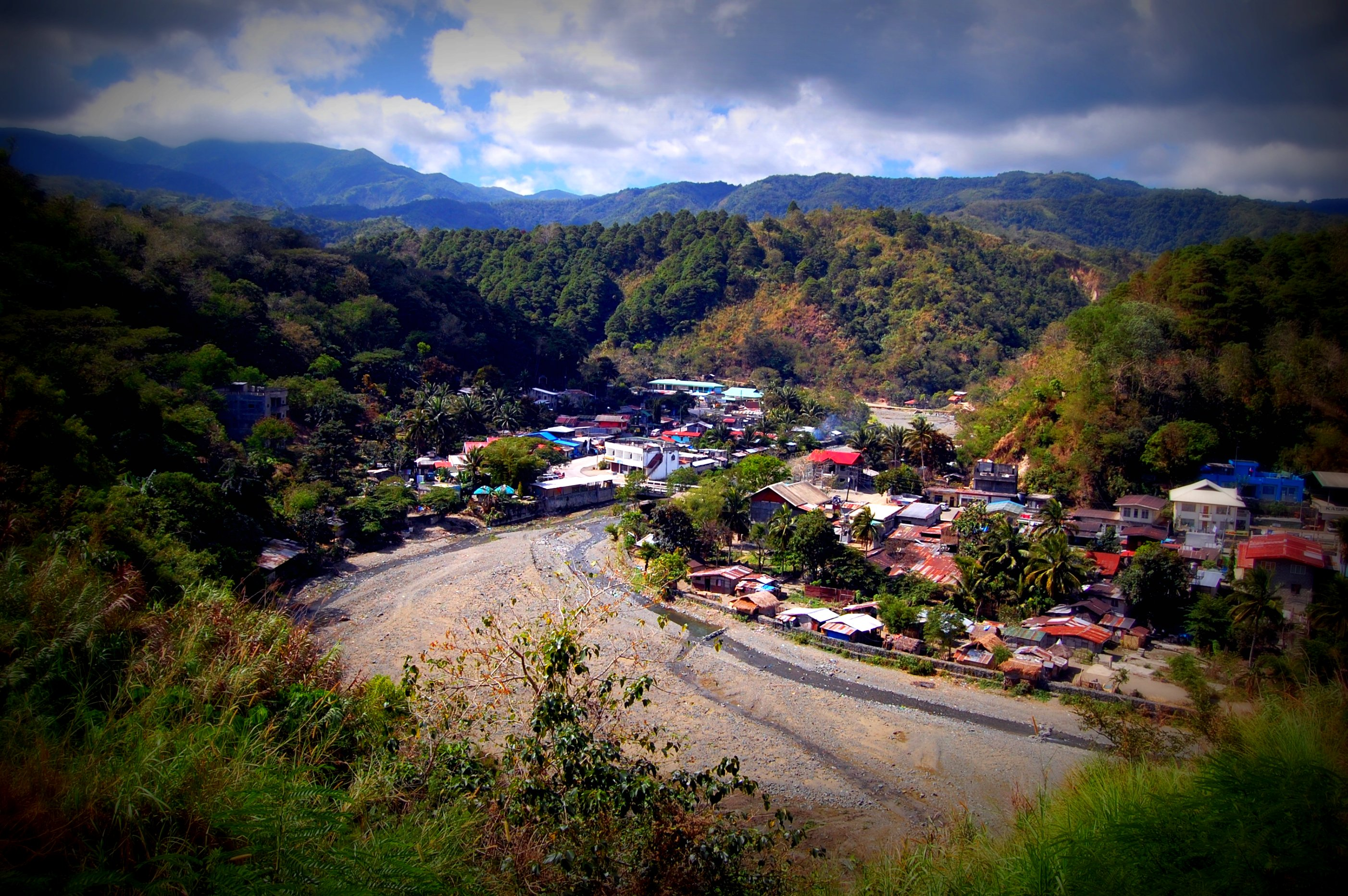
- Aerial view

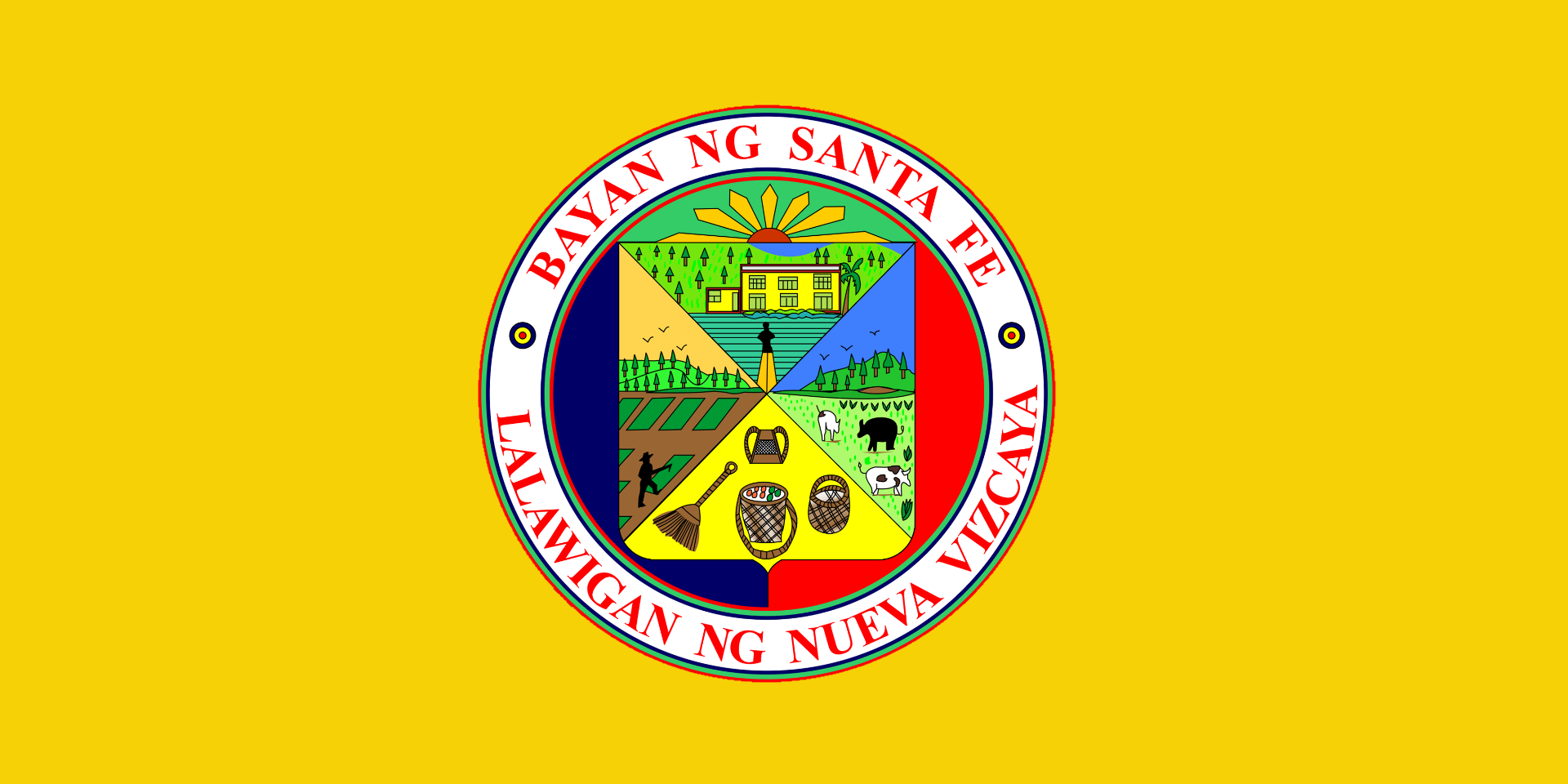
- Flag Seal
- Nicknames: Bus Layover Hub of Cagayan Valley; Little Baguio
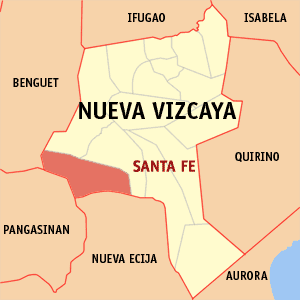
- Map of Nueva Vizcaya with Santa Fe highlighted
- Interactive map of Santa Fe
- Location within the Philippines Santa Fe (Philippines)
- Coordinates: 16°09′33″N 120°56′16″E
- Country: Philippines
- Region: Cagayan Valley
- Province: Nueva Vizcaya
- District: Lone district
- Barangays: 16 (see Barangays)

Government
  - Type: Sangguniang Bayan
  - Mayor: Liwayway Caramat
  - Vice Mayor: Jonathan M. Tindaan
  - Representative: Luisa L. Cuaresma
  - Electorate: 13,091 voters (2025)

Area
  - Total: 399.81 km^{2} (154.37 sq mi)
- Elevation: 913 m (2,995 ft)
- Highest elevation: 1,550 m (5,090 ft)
- Lowest elevation: 504 m (1,654 ft)

Population (2024 census)
  - Total: 18,950
  - Density: 47.40/km^{2} (122.8/sq mi)
  - Households: 4,496

Economy
  - Income class: 2nd municipal income class
  - Poverty incidence: 9.56% (2023)
  - Revenue: ₱ 199 million (2024)
  - Assets: ₱ 281.3 million (2024)
  - Expenditure: ₱ 190.3 million (2024)
  - Liabilities: ₱ 20.24 million (2024)

Service provider
  - Electricity: Nueva Vizcaya Electric Cooperative (NUVELCO)
- Time zone: UTC+8 (PST)
- ZIP code: 3705
- PSGC: 0205012000
- IDD : area code: +63 (0)78
- Native languages: Gaddang; Ilocano; Ibaloi; Kallahan; Tagalog
- Website: https://santafe-nvizcaya.gov.ph

Santa Fe, officially the Municipality of Santa Fe (Gaddang: Ili na Santa Fe; Ilocano: Ili ti Santa Fe; Tagalog: Bayan ng Santa Fe), is a municipality in the province of Nueva Vizcaya, Philippines. According to the 2024 census, it has a population of 18,950 people.

It is the municipality in which the notable Battle of Balete Pass where Brigadier General James Dalton II was killed during the Second World War.

== Etymology ==
According to the town’s official website, the former place name of Imugan derives from the combination of imug, a Kalanguya word and the English "gone", both of which have the same meaning. The current name is a clipping of San José de Santa Fe, (Spanish for "Saint Joseph of Holy Faith"), honouring the town's patron, Saint Joseph.

== History ==
The town's original inhabitants were the Kalanguya, an ethnic minority belonging to the Igorot people then later on followed by the Ilocanos, Pangasinenses and the Tagalogs.

=== Spanish era ===
Santa Fe was formerly an Igorot settlement during the Spanish era called Imugan. It was one of the settlements discovered during the mission of Ituy, which later became part of the jurisdiction of the Commandancia of Kayapa. It became part of Aritao before it finally stood independently as a town.

=== American era ===
The Municipal district of Imugan was founded by Governor-General Francis Burton Harrison in 1917 by virtue of Executive Order No. 39. The first appointed municipal president was a certain Kalanguya chief named Licodan who served until 1910.

On November 7, 1923, the Route 5 also known as San Jose–Santa Fe Road (Now part of the Maharlika Highway) was informally opened allowing easy access from Central Luzon to the Cagayan Valley.

=== Japanese occupation ===
During the Second World War, the Japanese Imperial Army established a puppet government in the country. Two strategic locations, Dalton Pass in Tactac and Salacsac Pass in Malico, witnessed significant combat between the retreating Japanese Army and the pursuing Allied Forces. Brigadier General James Dalton II of the United States Army Forces in the Far East (USAFFE) lost his life in the battle of Balete Pass on May 16, 1945, which is now known as "Dalton Pass" in his memory. Similarly, a shrine was built in Salacsac Pass to honor the unknown soldiers who displayed heroism during the war.

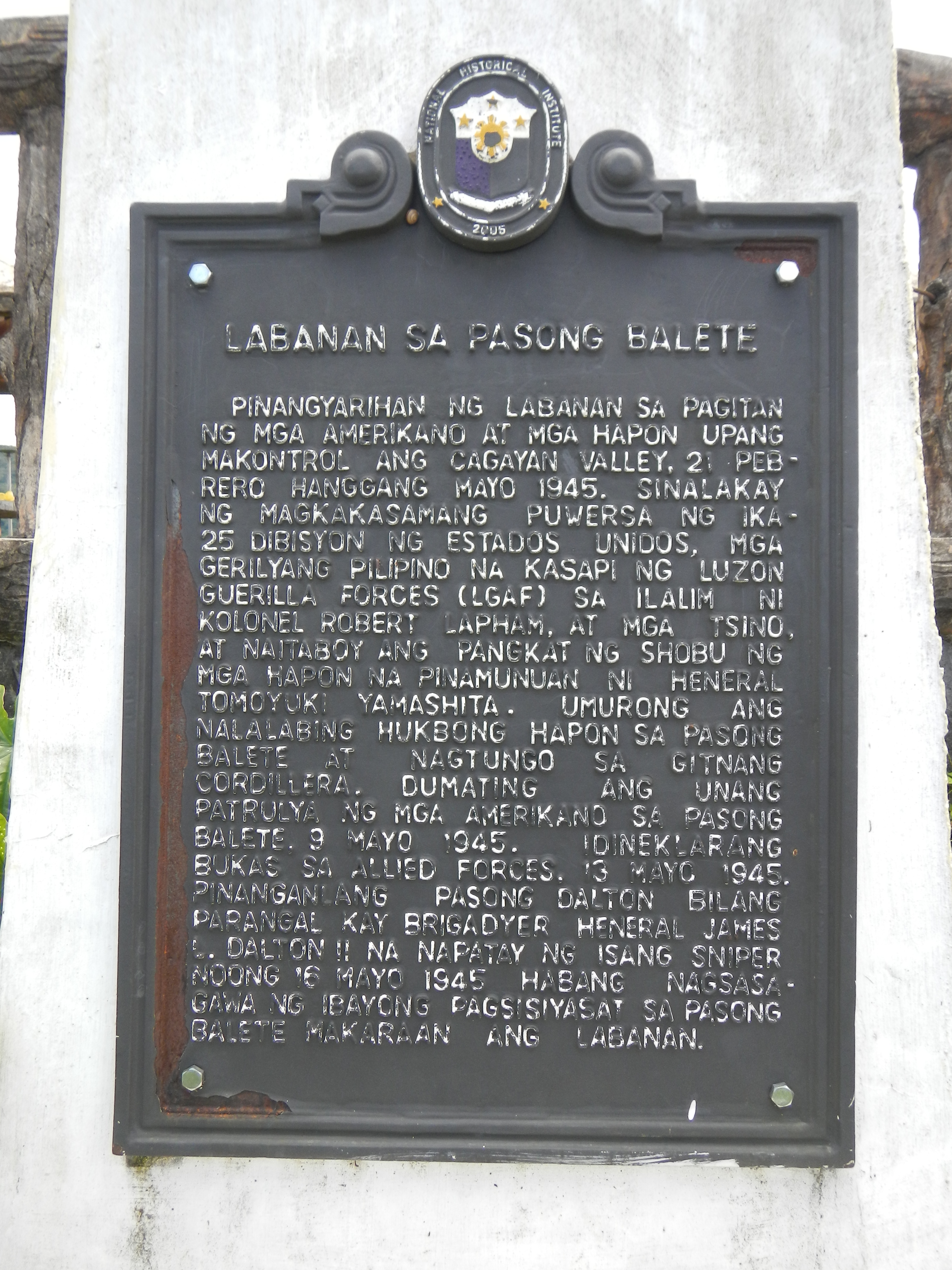
Historical Marker commemorating the Battle of Balete Pass

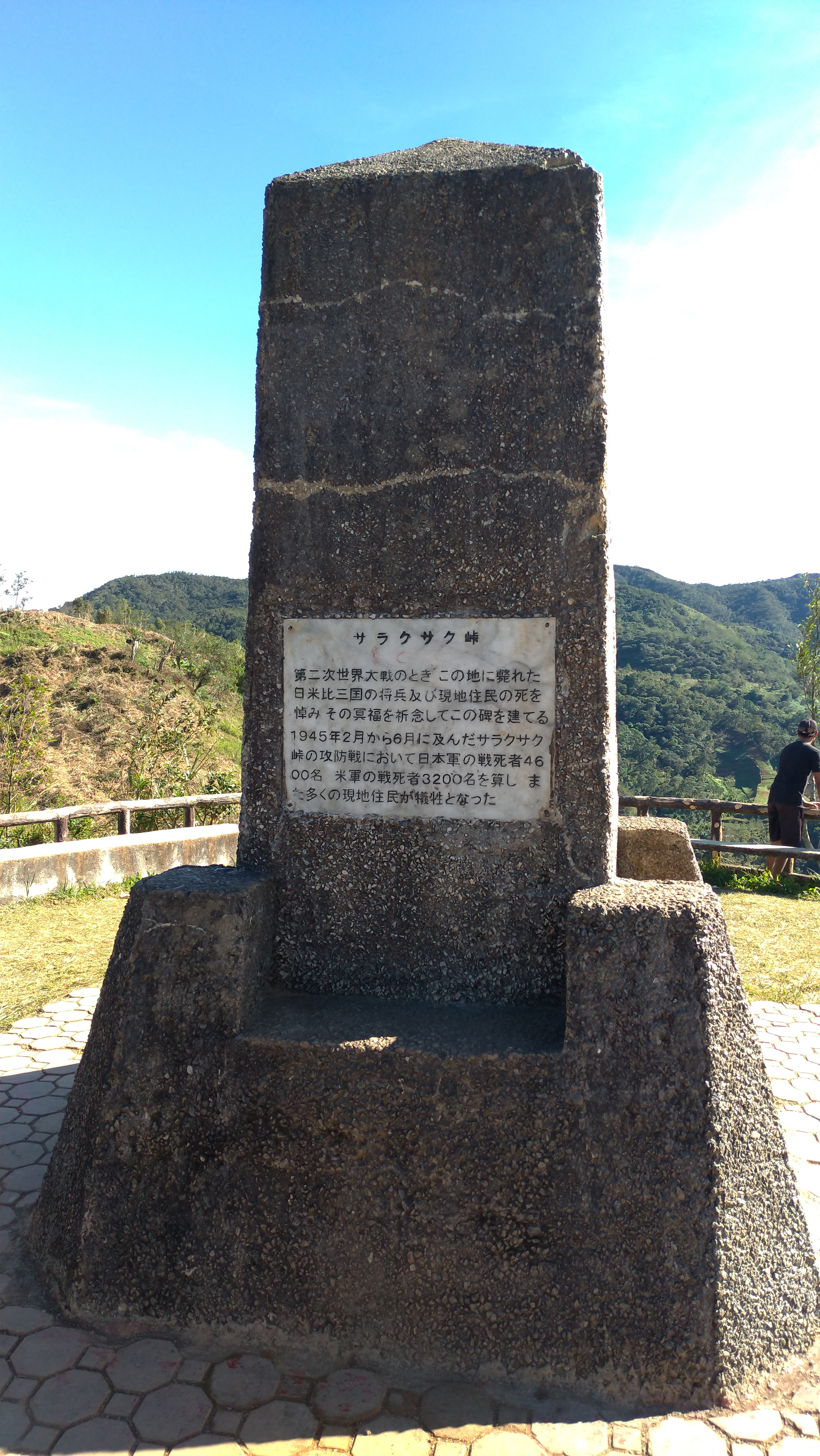
Tomb of the Unknown Soldier in Salacsac Pass

=== Post-war era ===
On 9 November 1950, Executive Order No. 368, signed by President Elpidio Quirino, abolished the municipal district structure in government and attached Imugan to Aritao and Kayapa. The place gradually developed to become a progressive municipal district. Republic Act. No. 2179 was enacted on May 6, 1959, recreating the Municipal district of Imugan and changing its name to Santa Fe in honor of the Patron Saint San Jose de Santa Fe. By virtue of Executive Order No., 77 dated July 18, 1967 it was converted from a municipal district to a regular municipality by President Ferdinand E. Marcos.

=== Contemporary period ===
In December 2000, around 50 NPA rebels raided the town's police station located at the municipal town hall. They ransacked and occupied the town hall for nearly two hours and leaving six policemen dead.

== Geography ==
Santa Fe is located in the southwest part of Nueva Vizcaya and is borders the municipalities of Aritao in the northwest, Kayapa in the northeast, Carranglan, Nueva Ecija in the south, Itogon, Benguet in the east, San Nicolas, and Natividad, Pangasinan (Note: Santa Fe claims that it borders the municipality of Natividad, Pangasinan, but the border is located in the disputed Barangay Malico. (See Boundary Dispute)) in the southwest.

It is the only town in Nueva Vizcaya that borders Pangasinan and is a typical bus stop for commuters going to the provinces of Isabela and Cagayan. This town is the end point of the Dalton Pass, a zig zag road from San Jose and Carranglan, Nueva Ecija.

Santa Fe is situated 53.06 kilometres (32.97 mi) from the provincial capital Bayombong, and 308.65 kilometres (191.79 mi) from the country's capital city of Manila.

=== Barangays ===
Santa Fe is politically subdivided into 16 (Note: This includes the disputed barangay Malico) barangays. Each barangay consists of puroks and some have sitios.

- Atbu
- Bacneng
- Balete
- Baliling
- Bantinan
- Baracbac
- Buyasyas
- Canabuan
- Imugan
- Malico (Note: Malico is a disputed barangay between the Municipalities of San Nicolas, Pangasinan and Santa Fe, Nueva Vizcaya (See Boundary Dispute))
- Poblacion
- Santa Rosa
- Sinapaoan
- Tactac
- Unib
- Villaflores

==== Boundary dispute ====
Santa Fe currently has a boundary dispute with San Nicolas, Pangasinan, in which Santa Fe claims the territory of barangay Malico. The Nueva Vizcaya provincial board passed a resolution on September 21, 2022, urging San Nicolas officials to respect a memorandum of agreement between the National Mapping and Resource Information Authority (NAMRIA), Pangasinan, and Nueva Vizcaya about twenty years ago. On the same day, the Nueva Vizcaya provincial board held a special session in Barangay Malico and issued a resolution requesting San Nicolas officials to refrain from building infrastructure projects within the barangay's boundaries. Said resolution also instructed San Nicolas officials to "respect the boundary" of Santa Fe as well as "the rights of the Kalanguya tribe and their ancestral domain rights."

In July 2024, the Pangasinan provincial government has allocated ₱200 million (US$4.06 million) for projects and services in Malico. Governor Ramon Guico III asserted Malico's affiliation with Pangasinan, emphasizing the province's commitment to enhancing local infrastructure and services regardless of the territorial dispute. Nueva Vizcaya Governor Jose Gambito warns of potential legal repercussions for Pangasinan's investments in the area. He also said that the two government agreed to pay ₱600,000 (US$12,182.74) for every NAMRIA survey but Pangasinan allegedly did not fulfill its promises.

=== Climate ===
Climate data for Santa Fe, Nueva Vizcaya
Month	Jan	Feb	Mar	Apr	May	Jun	Jul	Aug	Sep	Oct	Nov	Dec	Year
Mean daily maximum °C (°F)	26 (79)	27 (81)	28 (82)	30 (86)	29 (84)	28 (82)	27 (81)	26 (79)	26 (79)	27 (81)	27 (81)	26 (79)	27 (81)
Mean daily minimum °C (°F)	16 (61)	17 (63)	18 (64)	20 (68)	21 (70)	21 (70)	21 (70)	21 (70)	21 (70)	20 (68)	18 (64)	17 (63)	19 (67)
Average precipitation mm (inches)	13 (0.5)	15 (0.6)	21 (0.8)	33 (1.3)	92 (3.6)	121 (4.8)	142 (5.6)	124 (4.9)	121 (4.8)	143 (5.6)	50 (2.0)	22 (0.9)	897 (35.4)
Average rainy days	6.0	6.4	9.2	12.2	20.3	23.1	25.1	22.5	22.4	20.0	11.6	7.1	185.9
Source: Meteoblue

== Demographics ==
Population census of Santa Fe

Year	Pop.	±% p.a.
1918	3,571	—
1939	2,043	−2.62%
1948	2,126	+0.44%
1960	4,982	+7.35%
1970	4,254	−1.57%
1975	5,961	+7.00%
1980	6,338	+1.23%
1990	9,960	+4.62%

Year	Pop.	±% p.a.
1995	11,854	+3.32%
2000	12,949	+1.91%
2007	13,421	+0.50%
2010	14,427	+2.67%
2015	16,180	+2.21%
2020	18,276	+2.60%
2024	18,950	+0.87%

Source: Philippine Statistics Authority

According to the 2020 census, Santa Fe has a population of 18,276 in 4,496 households, the 13th most populated and 3rd least populated in the province of Nueva Vizcaya just higher than Ambaguio and slightly lower than Diadi. The population has grown by 2.42% compare to 2015. The population density of the municipality is 46 people per square kilometer (120/sq mi).

=== Ethnicity ===
==== Kalanguya (Ikalahan) ====
The municipality is one of the contiguous areas where the Kalanguya people, part of the Igorot people currently living. They are noted for production of basketry and brooms. In 1972, they founded the Kalahan Educational Fundation (KEF) to secure their ancestral lands. As of 2015, Kalanguya is the largest ethnic group in the municipality amounting to 14,500.

==== Iwak ====
Iwak (or I'kaw) people was one of the tribes present in the municipality, mostly found in Barangay Buyasyas. They are noted for making "Kabang", an all purpose basket which they sold in shops across the town. As of 2000, there were 368 Iwak in the town.

==== Ilocanos ====
Nueva Vizcaya as a whole was one of the place where the Ilocanos migrated into during early 20th century and Santa Fe is one of these places. Ilocanos mostly settled in the lower territory of town specifically along the rivers and roads. As of 2000, Ilocanos are the second largest ethnic group in Santa with 3,207.

==== Tagalogs ====
Tagalogs migrated to Santa Fe at the same time as the Ilocanos. As of 2000, there are 1,772 Tagalogs in the municipality making it the 3rd largest ethnic group in the town.

==== Pangasinans ====
Pangasinan people settled Santa Fe at the same time as the Ilocanos and Tagalogs. They mostly settled the boundary areas with Pangasinan Province.

=== Religion ===
According to the 2000 census by the National Statistics Office (NSO), (Note: (now Philippine Statistics Authority (PSA))) majority of the people of Santa Fe adhere to some form of Christianity. There were 62 people adhering to folk/tribal religion.

==== Roman Catholic ====
Santa Fe has one Roman Catholic Parish Church named "Church of Our Mother of Perpetual Help". The church is under the jurisdiction of the Diocese of Bayombong. As of 2000, there were 4,296 people adhering to Roman Catholicism.

==== Iglesia Ni Cristo ====
Iglesia ni Cristo in the municipality is under the church district of Nueva Vizcaya. There were 2 church in the municipality namely, "Local of Santa Fe" located in Barangay Villaflores and "Local of Baliling" located in Barangay Baliling. As of 2000, 622 people adhering to Iglesia ni Cristo.

=== Language ===
Ilocano and Tagalog are widely spoken across the municipality of Santa Fe. Kalanguya language is also widely spoken in the municipality most commonly by the Kalanguya people. Pangasinan language is spoken along the boundary areas w/ Pangasinan.

== Culture ==
=== Kalanguya Festival ===
Kalanguya Festival is a town fiesta held every March to promote Kalanguya culture. It features activities such as dance competition by various ethnic groups in the municipalities, float completion, beauty pageants, and various traditional Kalanguya games such as arm wrestling or hanggol and dapapnikillum or pig catching.

== Economy ==
Poverty incidence of Santa Fe (%)

Source: Philippine Statistics Authority

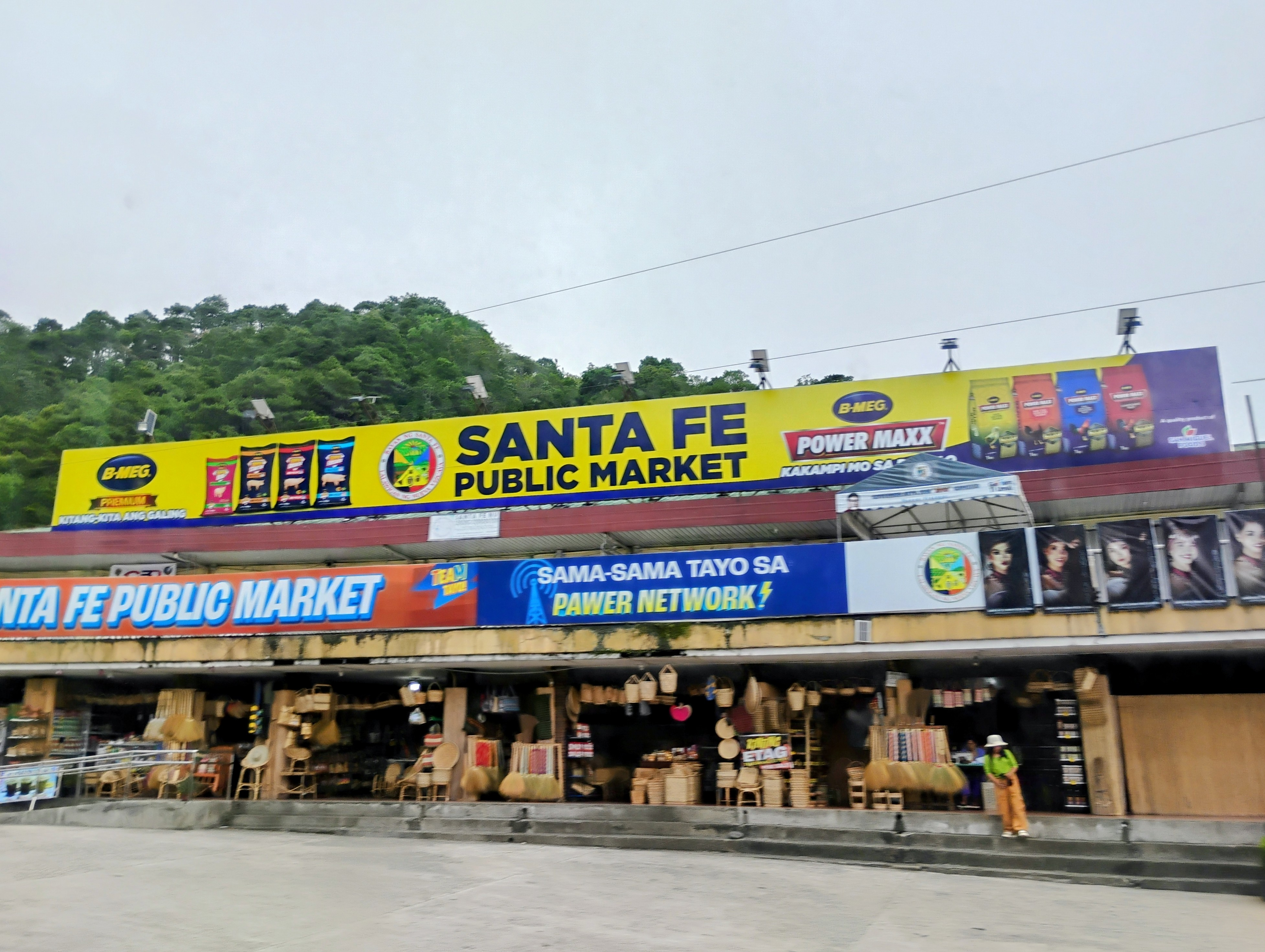
Santa Fe Public Market

According to the Philippine Statistics Authority, as of 2021, 16.18% of the population of Santa Fe have is living in poverty. It decrease by 1.47% since 2018. It is the 4th highest poverty incidence in the province of Nueva Vizcaya, slightly higher than Alfonso Castañeda and lower than Kasibu.

Local products include brooms, strawberry jam, strawberry wine, peanut butter, orchids and quilts.

== Government ==
=== Local government ===
Santa Fe is part of the lone congressional district of the province of Nueva Vizcaya. It is governed by a mayor, designated as its local chief executive, and by a municipal council as its legislative body in accordance with the Local Government Code. The mayor, vice mayor, and the municipal councilors are elected directly in polls held every three years.

=== Elected officials ===
Members of the Municipal Council (2022–2025)
Position	Name
Congressman	Luisa L. Cuaresma
Governor	Jose V. Gambito
Mayor	Liwayway C. Caramat
Vice-Mayor	Jonathan M. Tindaan
Councilors	Wycliff Dulawan
Councilors	Jon Dennis Galate
Councilors	Eddie Caramat Jr.
Councilors	Langley Bautista
Councilors	Mark Kristian Padilla
Councilors	Lovely Wowie Petonio
Councilors	Jayson Omallio
Councilors	Elias Baguya
IPMR	Benjamin Baguya

== Education ==
The Schools Division of Nueva Vizcaya governs the town's public education system. The division office is a field office of the DepEd in Cagayan Valley region. The Santa Fe Schools District Office governs all public and private elementary and high schools throughout the municipality. There are the schools in Santa Fe are:

=== Primary and elementary schools ===
- Agape Kiddie Center
- Atbu Elementary School
- Bacneng Elementary School
- Baliling Elementary School
- Bantinan Elementary School
- Baracbac Elementary School
- Buyasyas Elementary School
- Cauco Elementary School
- Genato Elementary School
- Imugan Elementary School
- Lawed Elementary School
- Sinapaoan Elementary School
- Sta. Fe Central School
- Tactac Elementary School
- Tan Yan Kee Elementary School
- Unib Primary School

=== Secondary schools ===
- Canabuan National High School
- Kalahan Academy
- Santa Fe National High School

== Tourism ==
=== Imugan Falls ===
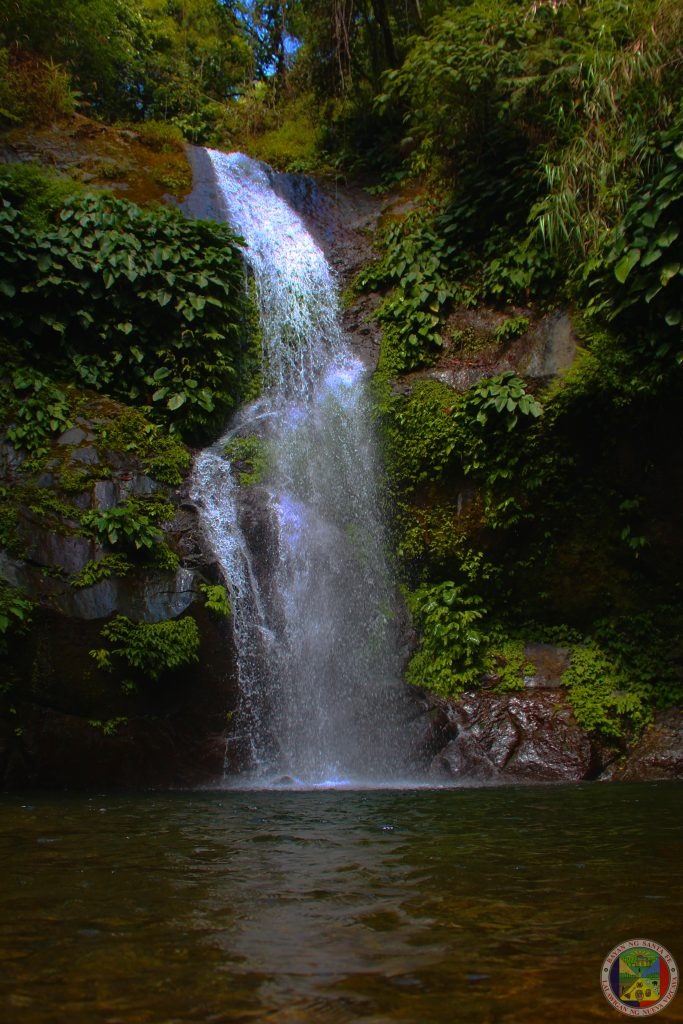

Imugan Falls is a 35 feet (11 m) two level waterfall located 1 kilometer (0.62 mi) from the barangay proper of Imugan.

=== Balete Pass National Park ===
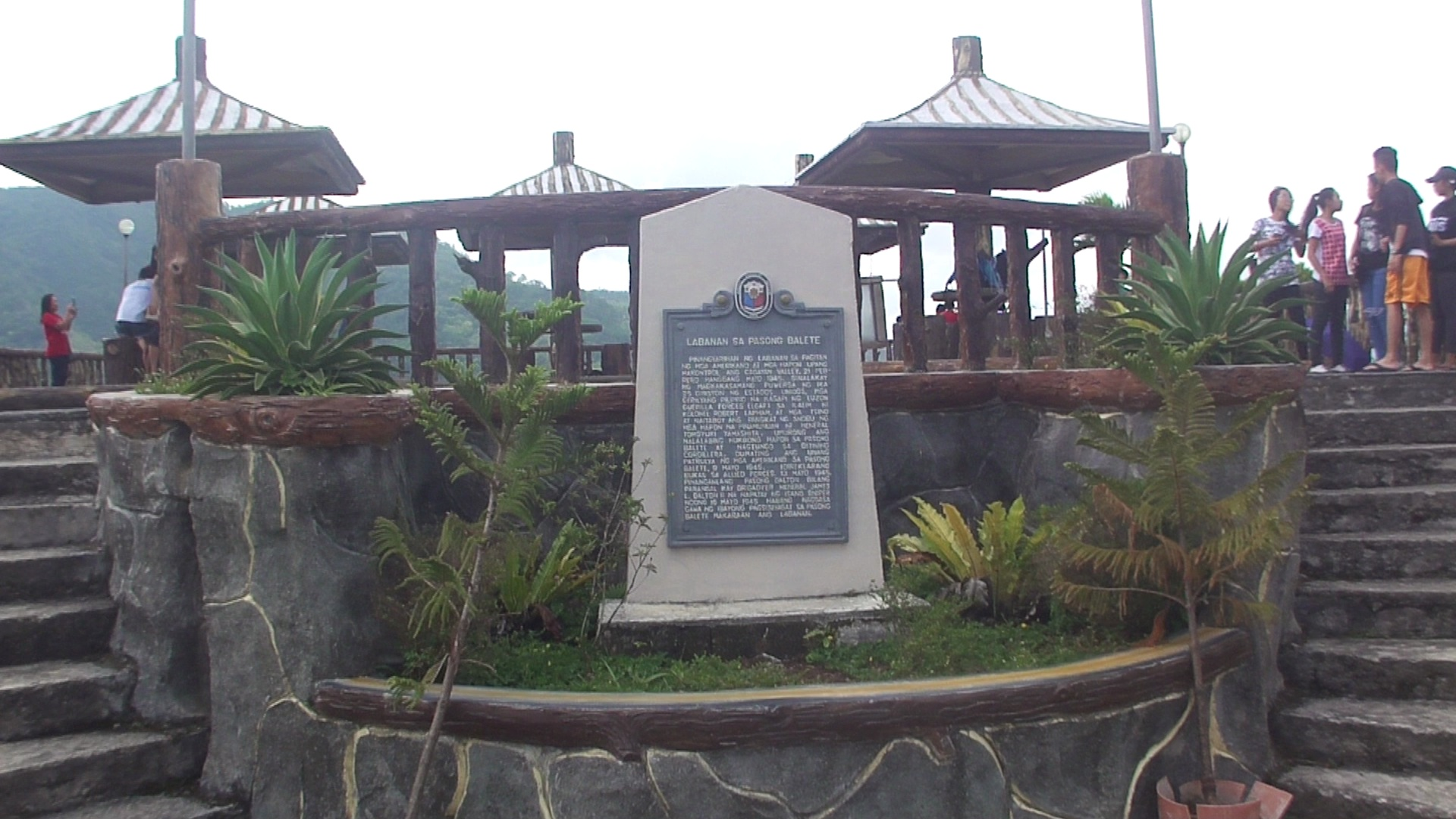

Balete Pass National Park also known as Dalton Pass is a 144.09 hectares (356.1 acres) national park where the famous Battle of Balete Pass between the US army and the Japanese Imperial Army happen in 1945. It features the white cross in the Japanese memorial site with the text "Peace Forever."

== Gallery ==
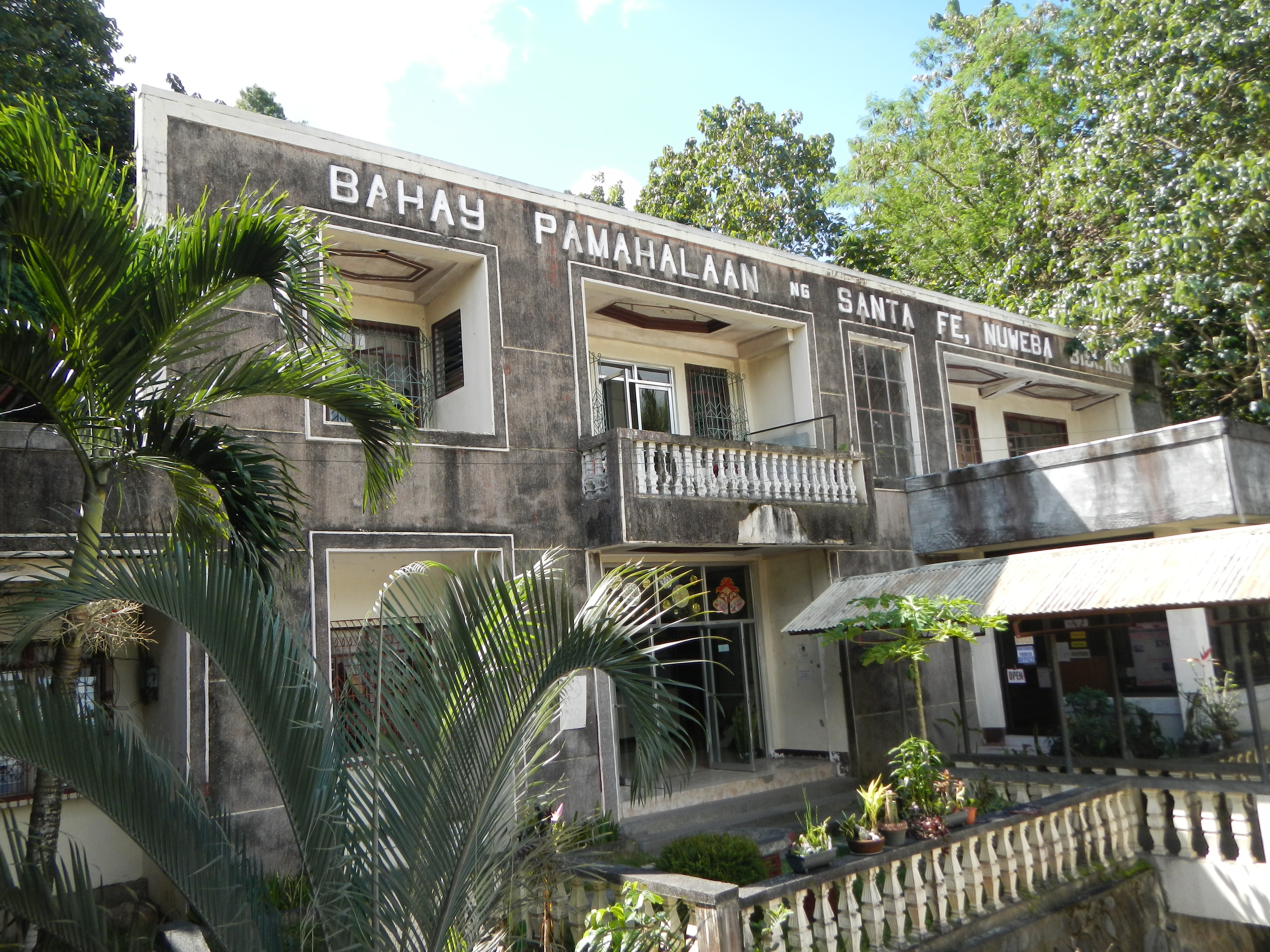
Municipal hall

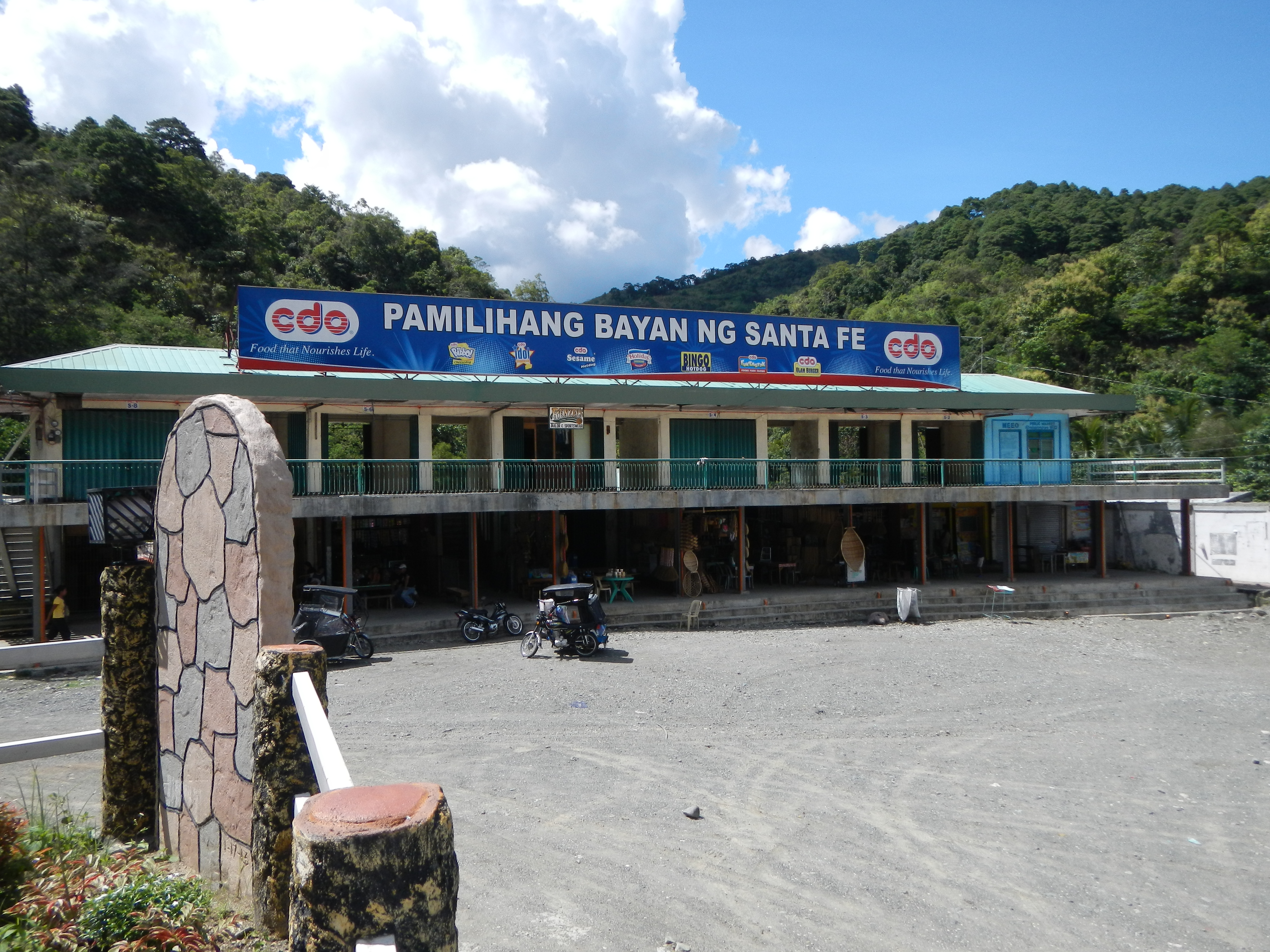
Public market

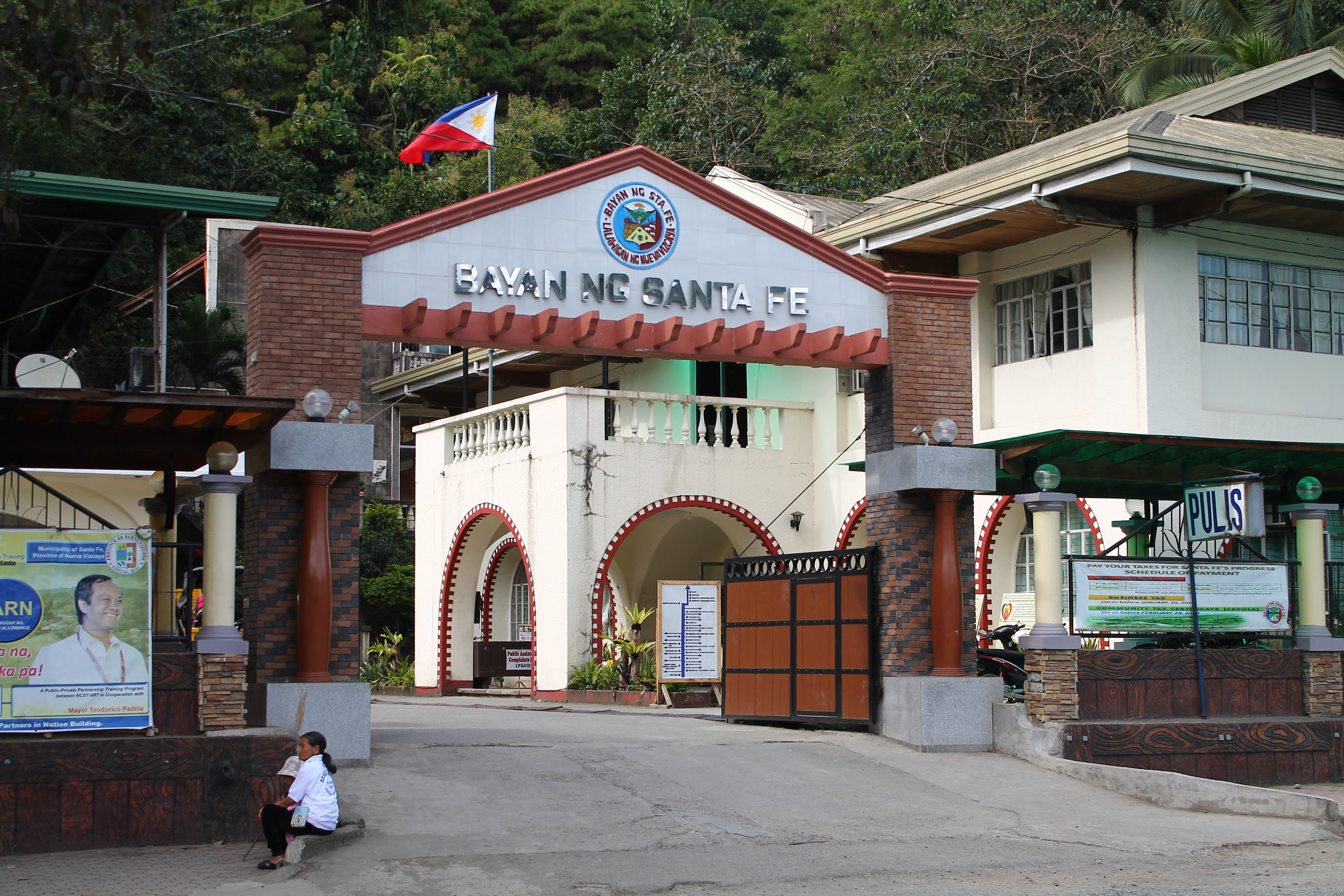
Municipal hall complex

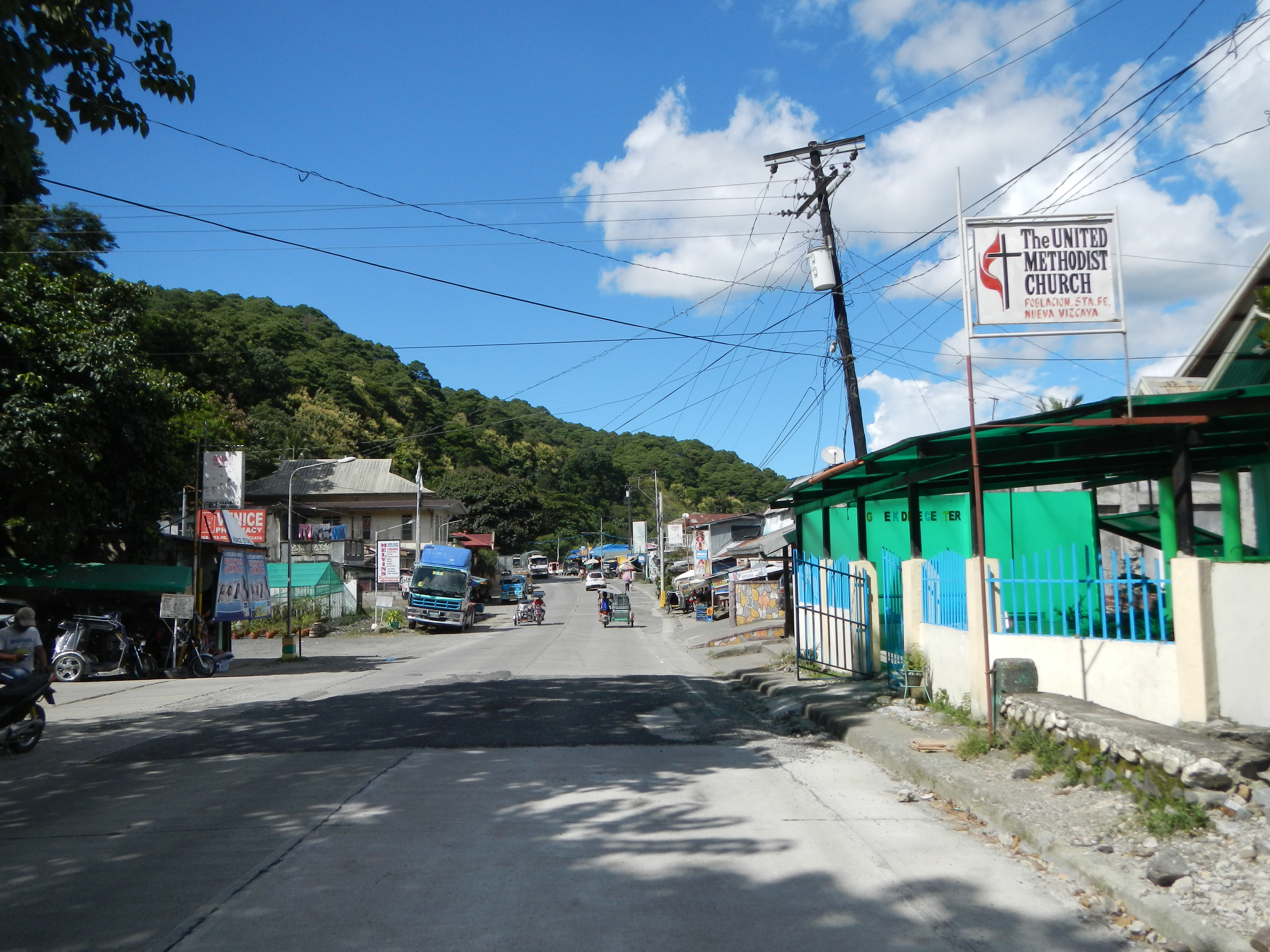
Town proper

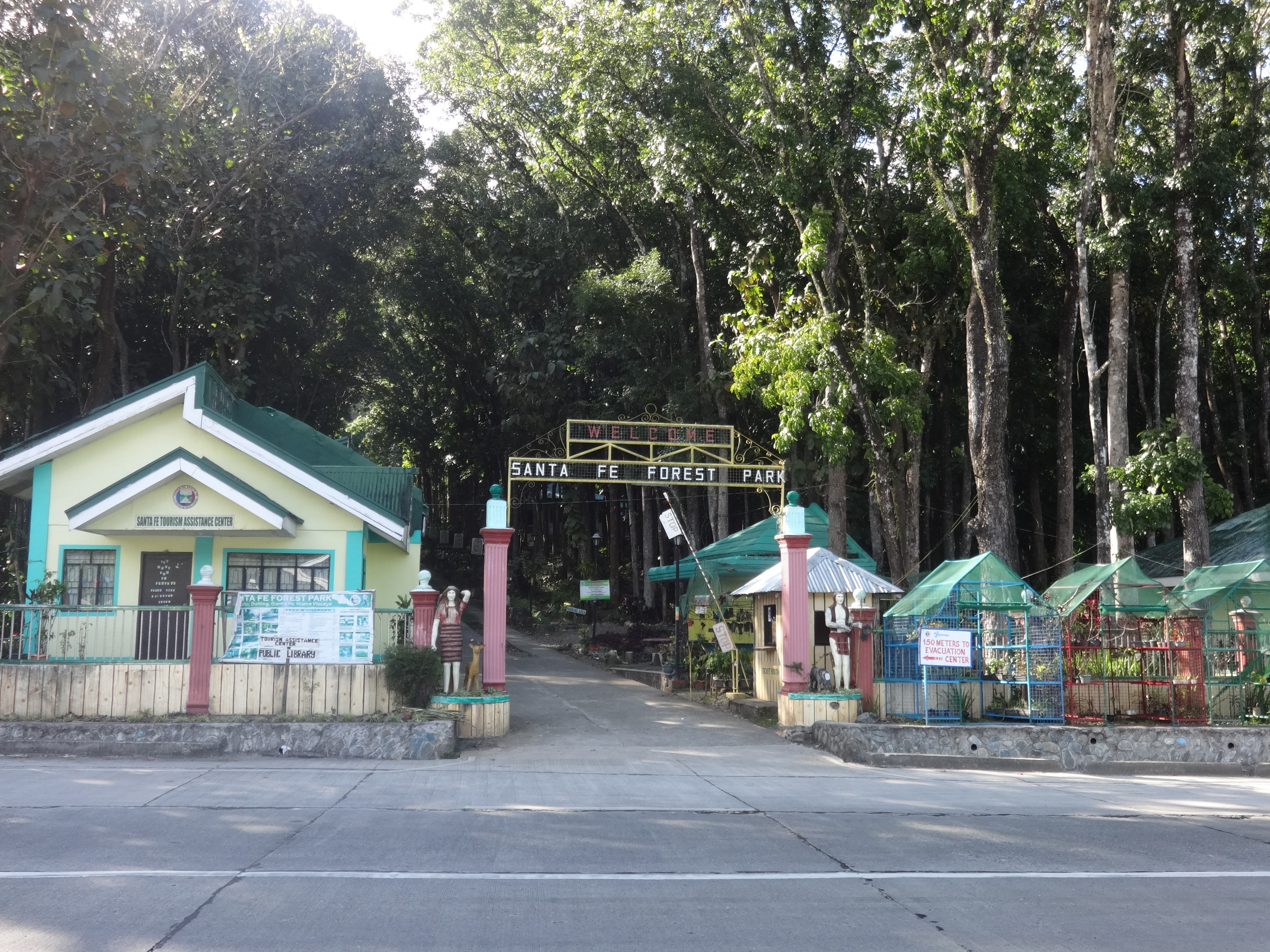
Forest Park
