= List of vice governors of Nueva Vizcaya =

Vice Governor of Nueva Vizcaya
- Incumbent; Eufemia Dacayo since May 5, 2023
- Seat: Nueva Vizcaya Provincial Capitol
- Nominator: Political party
- Term length: 3 years Up to three terms

The Vice Governor of Nueva Vizcaya (Filipino: Pangalawang Punong Lalawigan ng Nueva Vizcaya) is the presiding officer of the Sangguniang Panlalawigan, the legislature of the provincial government of Nueva Vizcaya, Philippines.

The current vice governor is Eufemia Dacayo, who acceded to the position from the Sangguniang Panlalawigan following the death of Governor Carlos Padilla and his replacement by Vice Governor Jose Gambito in 2023.

== History ==
The passage of Republic Act No. 2264 (Local Autonomy Act) on June 19, 1959, created an elected vice-governorship. Nueva Vizcaya's first vice governor was Castillo Tidang Sr.

== List of Vice Governors of Nueva Vizcaya ==
No.	Vice Governor	Term
1	Castillo Tidang Sr.	
2	Guillermo Aban	
3	Luis Bernabe	
4	Gloria Europa	
5	Ruth Padilla	1986-1987
6	Manuel Aquino	1987-1988
7	Alejandro Silapan	1988- June 1992
8	Rodolfo Agbayani	July–August 1992
9	Rogelio Corpuz	August 1992 – 1995
10	Natalia Dumlao	1995-1998
11	Luisa Lloren Cuaresma	1998-2004
12	Jose Gambito	2004-2013
13	Epifanio Lamberto D. Galima, Jr.	2013-2019
14	Jose "Tam-an" Tomas	2019-2022
(12)	Jose Gambito	2022–2023
15	Eufemia Dacayo	2023-present

== See also ==
- Governor of Nueva Vizcaya
