= Luisa Cuaresma =

Filipino politician

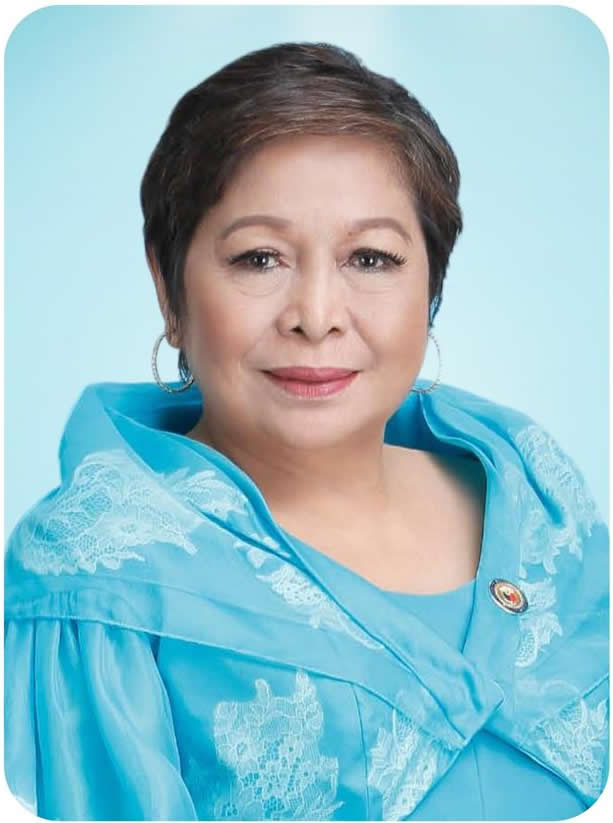
- Official portrait, 2022

Member of the Philippine House of Representatives from Nueva Vizcaya's Lone District
- In office June 30, 2016 – June 30, 2025
- Preceded by: Carlos Padilla
- Succeeded by: Timothy Joseph Cayton

19th Governor of Nueva Vizcaya
- In office June 30, 2004 – June 30, 2013
- Vice Governor: Jose Gambito
- Preceded by: Rodolfo Agbayani
- Succeeded by: Ruth Padilla

Vice Governor of Nueva Vizcaya
- In office June 30, 1998 – June 30, 2004
- Governor: Rodolfo Agbayani
- Preceded by: Natalia Dumlao
- Succeeded by: Jose Gambito

Mayor of Bambang, Nueva Vizcaya
- In office June 30, 1988 – June 30, 1998

Personal details
- Born: January 18, 1955 (age 71) Aritao, Nueva Vizcaya, Philippines
- Party: UNA (2012–2018, 2024–present)
- Other political affiliations: Lakas–CMD (1995-1998; 2021–2024); NUP (2018–2021); Nacionalista (2007-2012); LAMMP (1998-2000); LDP (1988-1995; 1998-2007); LnB (1987-1988)
- Spouse: Benjamin Roque Cuaresma
- Children: Benjamin Cuaresma III
- Occupation: Politician

Luisa "Banti" Lloren Cuaresma (born January 18, 1955) is a Filipina politician who served as the representative of the lone district of Nueva Vizcaya from 2016 to 2025. Previously, she served as governor of Nueva Vizcaya from 2004 until 2013 and vice-governor from 1998 until 2004. She is the province's fourth female governor.

== Early life ==
Cuaresma, a pharmacist by profession, was married to Bambang Mayor Benjamin Cuaresma, who was abducted and assassinated by the New People's Army on the eve of the 1988 local elections.

== Political career ==
After her husband's murder, Cuaresma ran for mayor in the 1988 election and won, serving the three-term limit until 1998. Afterwards, she was elected vice governor for two terms before becoming the fifth woman to become governor of Nueva Vizcaya in 2004. She served in that post until 2013, when she made an unsuccessful bid to run for the lone district of Nueva Vizcaya in the 16th Congress. She was finally elected to the 17th Congress in 2016 and was reelected in 2019 and 2022. She ran for governor in the 2025 Philippine general election, but lost to the incumbent, Jose Gambito.

Cuaresma was a critic of large-scale mining operations in the province such as the Didipio mine operated by the Australian mining firm OceanaGold in the town of Kasibu. In 2008, she and other officials of the provincial government were sued for blocking the mine's operations.

As a congresswoman, Cuaresma co-signed the impeachment complaint against Vice President Sara Duterte on February 5, 2025.

== Personal life ==
Cuaresma has four children, the eldest of whom, Benjamin III, has served as mayor of Bambang.

== Electoral history ==
Election Year	Position	Party	Votes for Cuaresma				Result
Election Year	Position	Party	Total	%	Plc.	Swing	Result
1988	Mayor	Lakas	6,187	48.62%	1st	N/A	Won
1992	Mayor	LDP	7,764	57.38%	1st	+9.12%	Won
1995	Mayor	Lakas–CMD	12,562	100.00%	1st	+42.62%	Won
1998	Vice Governor	LAMMP	64,444	51.45%	1st	N/A	Won
2001	Vice Governor	LDP	73,609	62.82%	1st	+11.37%	Won
2004	Governor	LDP	56,008	39.62%	1st	N/A	Won
2007	Governor	Nacionalista	83,643	57.60%	1st	+17.98%	Won
2010	Governor	Nacionalista	108,182	65.97%	1st	+8.37%	Won
2013	Representative	UNA	51,313	39.33%	2nd	N/A	Lost
2016	Representative	UNA	78,125	45.77%	1st	+6.44%	Won
2019	Representative	NUP	114,338	56.08%	1st	+10.31%	Won
2022	Representative	Lakas–CMD	165,360	72.25%	1st	+16.17%	Won
2025	Governor	UNA	82,192	33.48%	2nd	N/A	Lost
