= Governor of Nueva Vizcaya =

Local chief executive

Provincial Governor of Nueva Vizcaya
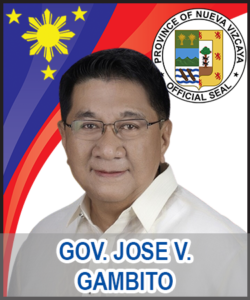
- Incumbent; Jose Gambito since May 5, 2023
- Appointer: Popular Vote or by succession from Vice Governor
- Term length: 3 years
- Inaugural holder: Tomas Maddela Sr. (Civil Governor)
- Formation: 1841 (Spanish era), 1917 (American era)
- Website: https://nuevavizcaya.gov.ph/executive-branch/

The governor of Nueva Vizcaya (Filipino: Punong Panlalawigan ng Nueva Vizcaya), is the chief executive of the provincial government of Nueva Vizcaya.

== Provincial Governors (1917–present) ==
There have been 21 governors of Nueva Vizcaya since its reorganization in 1917.

No.	Image	Governor	Term
1		Tomas P. Maddela Sr. (First Filipino Governor)	1917–1918
2		Lope K. Santos	1918–1920
3		Domingo Maddela	1920–1925
4		Alfonso Castañeda	1925–1928
5		Juan A. Manzano	1928–1931
6		Leon Cabarroguis	1931–1937
(1)		Tomas P. Maddela Sr.	1938–1940
7		Demetrio Quirino Sr.	1940–1945
8		Martin Lopez	1945–1946
9		Jose A. Madarang	1946–1948
10		Manolo Maddela	1949–1951
(9)		Jose A. Madarang	1952–1955
11		Jose G. Espino	1955–1962
12		Corazon M. Espino	1962
13		Patricio G. Dumlao Sr.	1963–1976
14		Belen F. Calderon	1976
15		Osias D. Cadiente	1976–1980
16		Natalia F. Dumlao	1980–1986
(14)		Belen F. Calderon	1986–1987
17		Ruth R. Padilla	1987–1988
(13)		Patricio G. Dumlao Sr.	1988–1992
18		Rodolfo Q. Agbayani	1992–2004
19		Luisa Lloren Cuaresma	2004–2013
(17)		Ruth R. Padilla	2013–2016
20		Carlos M. Padilla	2016–2023
21		Jose Gambito	2023–present

== See also ==
- List of vice governors of Nueva Vizcaya
