= Nueva Vizcaya Provincial Board =

Legislative body of the province of Nueva Vizcaya, Philippines

Nueva Vizcaya Provincial Board Sangguniang Panlalawigan ng Nueva Vizcaya

Type
- Type: Unicameral
- Term limits: 3 terms (9 years)

Leadership
- Presiding Officer: Eufemia Dacayo, Aksyon

Structure
- Seats: 14 board members 1 ex officio presiding officer
- Political groups: Nacionalista (5) Lakas–CMD (2) UNA (1) Aksyon (1) PFP (1) TBD (1) Nonpartisan (3)
- Length of term: 3 years
- Authority: Local Government Code of the Philippines

Elections
- Voting system: Multiple non-transferable vote (regular members); Indirect election (ex officio members)
- Last election: May 12, 2025
- Next election: May 15, 2028

Meeting place
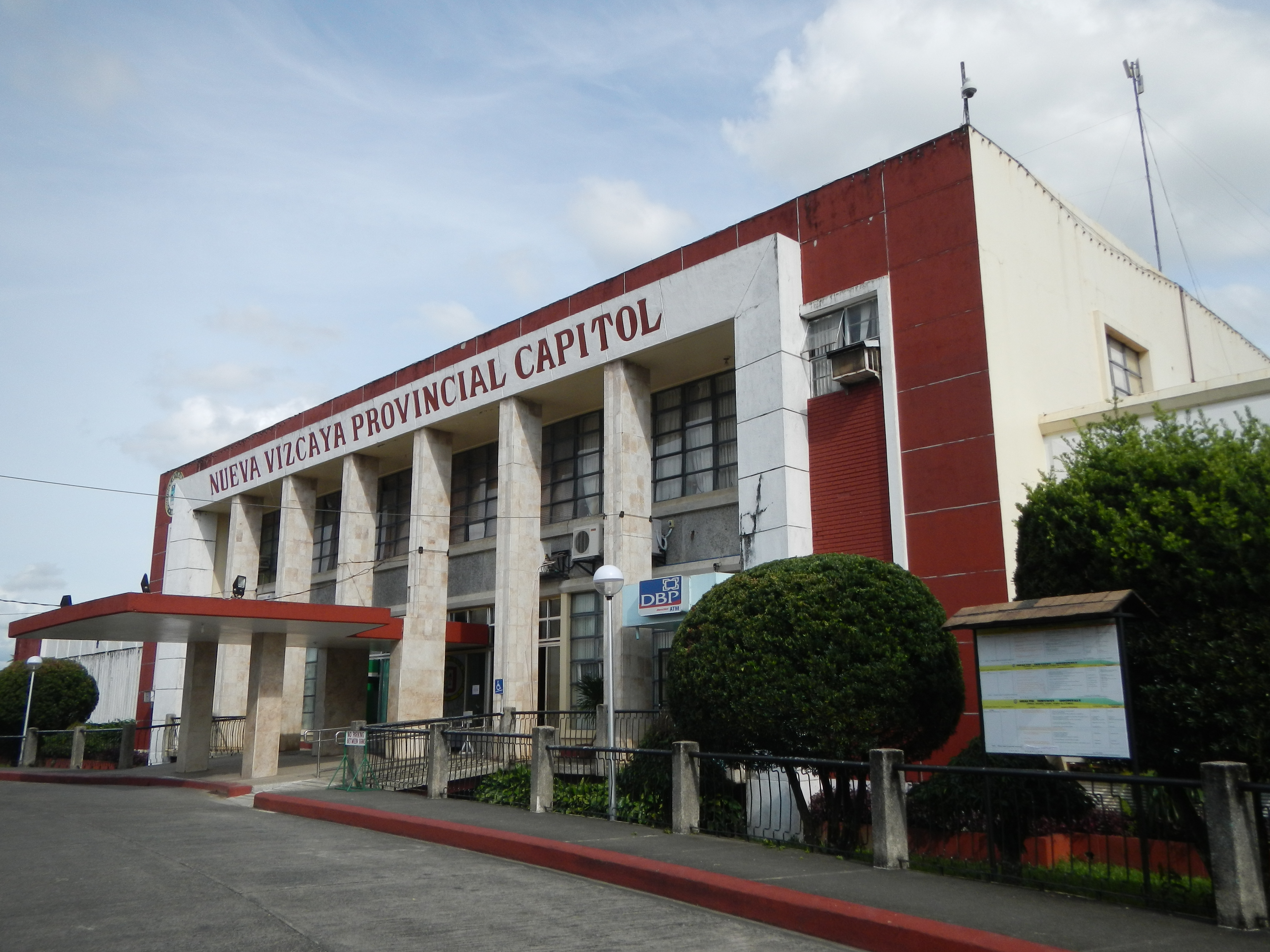
- Nueva Vizcaya Provincial Capitol, Bayombong

The Nueva Vizcaya Provincial Board is the Sangguniang Panlalawigan (provincial legislature) of the Philippine province of Nueva Vizcaya.

The members are elected via plurality-at-large voting: the province is divided into two districts, each having five seats. A voter votes up to five names, with the top five candidates per district being elected. The vice governor is the ex officio presiding officer, and only votes to break ties. The vice governor is elected via the plurality voting system province-wide.

The districts used in appropriation of members is not coextensive with the legislative district of Nueva Vizcaya; unlike congressional representation which is at-large, Nueva Vizcaya is divided into two districts for representation in the Sangguniang Panlalawigan.

Aside from the regular members, the board also includes the provincial federation presidents of the Liga ng mga Barangay (ABC, from its old name "Association of Barangay Captains"), the Sangguniang Kabataan (SK, youth councils) and the Philippine Councilors League (PCL).

== Apportionment ==
Elections	Seats per district		Ex officio seats	Total seats
Elections	1st	2nd	Ex officio seats	Total seats
2010–present	5	5	4	14

== List of members ==
=== Current members ===
These are the members after the 2025 local elections and 2023 barangay and SK elections

- Vice Governor: Eufemia A. Dacayo ( Aksyon; since May 5, 2023)

Seat	Board member	Party	Start of term	End of term
1st district	Luisa Corazon L. Cuaresma	UNA	June 30, 2025	June 30, 2028
1st district	Leah D. Tidang	Aksyon	June 30, 2025	June 30, 2028
1st district	Leonard Clemens L. Cadoy	Nacionalista	June 30, 2025	June 30, 2028
1st district	Emerlene Jane G. Martinez	Nacionalista	June 30, 2025	June 30, 2028
1st district	Pablo P. Kindot	Lakas	June 30, 2022	June 30, 2028
2nd district	Eunice G. Gambol	Nacionalista	August 8, 2019	June 30, 2028
2nd district	John Severino G. Bagasao	Lakas	June 30, 2025	June 30, 2028
2nd district	Primo Percival J. Marcos	PFP	June 30, 2019	June 30, 2028
2nd district	Wilson D. Salas	Nacionalista	June 30, 2025	June 30, 2028
2nd district	Flodemonte S. Gerdan	Nacionalista	June 30, 2019	June 30, 2028
ABC	Victor Gines	Nonpartisan	July 30, 2018	January 1, 2023
PCL	TBD			June 30, 2028
SK	Marizel Reyes	Nonpartisan	June 8, 2018	January 1, 2023
IPMR	Samuel Balinhawang	Nonpartisan		

=== Vice governor ===
Election year	Name	Party	Ref.
2016	Epifanio Lambert D. Galima, Jr.	Nacionalista	
2019	Jose Tomas, Jr.	NUP	
2022	Jose Gambito (until May 5, 2023)	Lakas	
2022	Eufemia Dacayo (since May 5, 2023)	Lakas	
2025	Eufemia Dacayo (since May 5, 2023)	Aksyon	

=== 1st district ===
- Population (2024):

Election year	Member (party)	Member (party)	Member (party)	Member (party)	Member (party)	Ref.
2016	Elma Pinao-an Lejao (Nacionalista)	Delbert D. Ditang, Sr. (Nacionalista)	Pepito Balgos (Nacionalista)	Edgardo Balgos (UNA)	Alexander Calulot, Jr. (UNA)	
2019	Elma Pinao-an Lejao (Nacionalista)	Delbert D. Ditang, Sr. (Nacionalista)	Edgardo Balgos (NUP)	Cirilo R. Galindez (NUP)	Flodemonte S. Gerdan (Nacionalista)	
2022	Elma Pinao-an Lejao (Nacionalista)	Delbert D. Ditang, Sr. (Nacionalista)	Edgardo Balgos (Lakas)	Pablo P. Kindot (Lakas)	Flodemonte S. Gerdan (Aksyon)	
2025	Luisa Corazon L. Cuaresma (UNA)	Leonard Clemens L. Cadoy (Nacionalista)	Emerlene Jane G. Martinez (Nacionalista)	Pablo P. Kindot (Lakas)	Leah D. Tidang (Aksyon)	

=== 2nd district ===
- Population (2024):

Election year	Member (party)	Member (party)	Member (party)	Member (party)	Member (party)	Ref.
2016	Patricio Dumlao (Nacionalista)	Nestor M. Sevillena (Nacionalista)	Johnny Liban (Nacionalista)	Wilson D. Salas (Nacionalista)	Roland M. Carub (UNA)	
2019	Patricio Dumlao (Nacionalista)	Nestor M. Sevillena (Nacionalista)	Eunice G. Gambol (Nacionalista)	Primo Percival J. Marcos (NUP)	Roland M. Carub (NUP)	
2022	Patricio Dumlao (Nacionalista)	Eufemia A. Dacayo (until May 5, 2023) (Lakas)	Eunice G. Gambol (Nacionalista)	Primo Percival J. Marcos (PFP)	Roland M. Carub (Lakas)	
2025	John Severino G. Bagasao (Lakas)	Wilson D. Salas (Nacionalista)	Eunice G. Gambol (Nacionalista)	Primo Percival J. Marcos (PFP)	Flodemonte S. Gerdan (Nacionalista)	
