= Carlos Padilla (politician) =

Filipino politician (1944–2023)

The Honorable Carlos M. Padilla
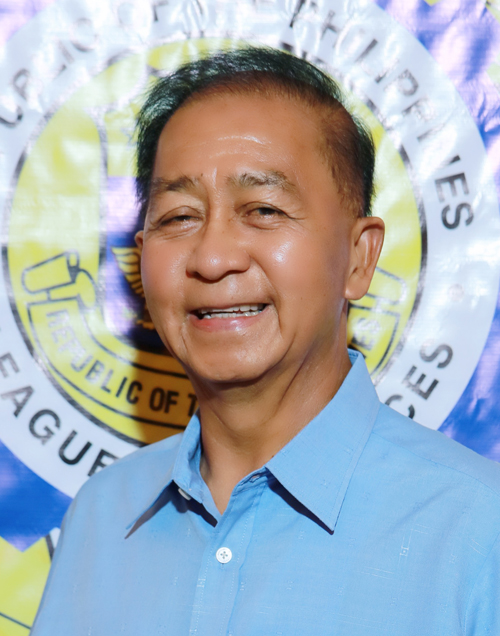
- Padilla in 2016

20th Governor of Nueva Vizcaya
- In office June 30, 2016 – May 5, 2023
- Vice Governor: Epifanio Lamberto Galima Jr. (2016–2019); Jose Tomas (2019–2022); Jose Gambito (2022–2023)
- Preceded by: Ruth Raña Padilla
- Succeeded by: Jose Gambito

Deputy Speaker of the House of Representatives of the Philippines
- In office July 22, 2013 – June 30, 2016
- In office January 24, 2001 – June 30, 2001

House Minority Leader
- In office July 23, 2001 – June 30, 2004
- Preceded by: Arnulfo Fuentebella
- Succeeded by: Francis Escudero

Member of the Philippine House of Representatives from Nueva Vizcaya
- In office June 30, 2007 – June 30, 2016
- Preceded by: Rodolfo Agbayani
- Succeeded by: Luisa Lloren Cuaresma
- In office June 30, 1995 – June 30, 2004
- Preceded by: Leonardo Perez
- Succeeded by: Rodolfo Agbayani
- In office June 30, 1987 – June 30, 1992
- Preceded by: Leonardo Perez
- Succeeded by: Leonardo Perez

Member of the Interim Batasang Pambansa
- In office 1978–1984
- Constituency: Region II

Mayor of Dupax del Norte
- In office 1975–1978

Personal details
- Born: Carlos Mapili Padilla; September 19, 1944 Dupax, Nueva Vizcaya, Philippines
- Died: May 5, 2023 (aged 78) Solano, Nueva Vizcaya, Philippines
- Party: Nacionalista (2007–2023)
- Other political affiliations: LDP (1995–2007); PDP–Laban (1987–1995); UNIDO (1984–1987); KBL (1978–1984)
- Spouse: Ruth Cacpal Raña
- Children: 3
- Education: Polytechnic University of the Philippines (BCom)

Carlos Mapili Padilla (Tagalog pronunciation: [paˈdilja]; September 19, 1944 – May 5, 2023) was a Filipino politician who served as the governor of Nueva Vizcaya from 2016 until his death in 2023. Padilla was elected to his first term as governor in 2016 and was re-elected in 2019 and 2022.

== Early life and education ==
Carlos Mapili Padilla was born in present-day Dupax del Norte, Nueva Vizcaya, Philippines on September 19, 1944. As an illegitimate child whose father died when he was 13, he was raised by his mother, Victoriana Mapili of Aringay, La Union, and Tayug, Pangasinan, along with his two siblings. He studied at the Polytechnic University of the Philippines (PUP), where he served as President of the Supreme Student Council.

== Political career ==
Padilla first served as mayor of the then-undivided municipality of Dupax, Nueva Vizcaya from 1971 to 1975. He was the last mayor of an undivided Dupax and the first mayor of Dupax Del Norte after Dupax was split into three municipalities in 1975 namely, Dupax del Norte, Dupax del Sur and Alfonso Castañeda.

=== Batasang Pambansa; opposition leader in Nueva Vizcaya ===
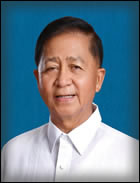
Padilla official portrait during the 16th Congress.

In 1978, he was among eight assemblymen elected to represent Region II (Cagayan Valley) in the Interim Batasang Pambansa as a member of the Kilusang Bagong Lipunan party of President Ferdinand Marcos. He ran again in 1984 as an opposition candidate to represent Nueva Vizcaya in the Regular Batasang Pambansa but lost to former Congressman and Senator Leonardo Perez after a bitterly disputed campaign marred by allegations of fraud.

When the People Power Revolution erupted in February 1986, Padilla, an ally of opposition figure Cory Aquino, was noted to have been in hiding due to the government's manhunt for him.

=== House of Representatives ===
Padilla was finally elected to represent Nueva Vizcaya in the restored Congress in 1987.

While in Congress, he served as deputy speaker and a minority leader. He became a member of very important congressional bodies such as the Commission on Appointments and the House of Representative Electoral Tribunal (HRET). He became the co-chair of the Congressional Commission on Education (EDCom), a body to assess Philippine education. As Education Committee chairman, he authored the landmark law Free High School Act of 1988 (RA 6655) that ensures free high school education for every Filipino, and RA 6728, providing various forms of government assistance to students and teachers in private education. Padilla also authored RA 6966 regulating the librarian profession, RA 7104 creating the Commission on the Filipino Language, RA 7168 converting the Philippine Normal College into the Philippine Normal University, RA 7536 creating the National Commission for Culture and the Arts, the Philippine Nursing Act (RA 9173), and the Philippine Dentistry Bill (HB 4908). Padilla was also the principal author and sponsor of laws establishing schools in the province such as the Nueva Vizcaya State University and the Philippine Science High School-Cagayan Valley Campus, located in Bayombong.

On several occasions, he represented Congress in several international conferences abroad, such as the International Labour Organization Conference in Geneva, the Asia-Pacific Parliamentarians' Union, the ASEAN Inter-Parliamentary Organization Conference, and the UNESCO General Assembly in Paris among others.

=== 2004 elections ===
In 2004, he ran for senator. He was the sole senatorial candidate of presidential aspirant Panfilo Lacson and lost. He ended up at the 24th spot garnering 3,863,693 votes which represents 11.53% votes.

=== Governor of Nueva Vizcaya ===
Padilla ran for governor in 2016 and won, receiving 91,105 votes. He ran again for a second term in 2019 winning by a bigger margin. He secured his last term after winning in the 2022 local elections, garnering 143,552 votes.

During his time in office, he was a critic of large-scale mining operations in the province such as the Didipio mine operated by the Australian mining firm OceanaGold in the town of Kasibu. After the firm's permit to operate the mine expired on June 20, 2019, Padilla issued a directive to the company to cease its operation. However, it was overruled by the national government, which renewed the permit for another 25 years.

=== Views ===
As congressman, Padilla opposed capital punishment, being a leading proponent for its repeal in the 2000s.

== Personal life and death ==
Carlos M. Padilla was married to Ruth Raña Padilla, who also served as governor of Nueva Vizcaya and commissioner of the Professional Regulatory Commission (PRC). They had three children: Carlos Jr. (Jojo), Ruthie Maye (Maye), and Carlo Paolo (CP).

Padilla died after suffering a heart attack in his residence in Solano, Nueva Vizcaya, on May 5, 2023, at the age of 78. He was later interred at his ancestral home in Dupax del Norte.

== Awards ==
Padilla was a recipient of the outstanding alumnus award at the Polytechnic University of the Philippines (PUP), where he also received his doctorate degree in public administration, honoris causa. He likewise received the same honorary degree in education, and in humanities, from the Philippine Normal University and the Nueva Vizcaya State Institute of Technology and the Nueva Vizcaya State Polytechnic College, now the Nueva Vizcaya State University (NVSU) respectively. In 2022, he was awarded the Dangal ng Wika by the Komisyon sa Wikang Filipino (KWF) in recognition of his contributions and achievement in the furtherance of the use of the Filipino language.

== Legacy ==
Anti-mining advocates in El Salvador commended Padilla for his contribution to the historic unanimous vote of the country's legislature banning metal mining to protect rivers, thus making El Salvador the first nation to do so. The decision was made in 2017 following Padilla's testimony before Salvadoran legislators and public about the effects of OceanaGold, causing the company to pay compensation and the eventual abandonment of the El Dorado project. This story was documented in the book The Water Defenders: How Ordinary People Saved a Country from Corporate Greed, which won a Philippine National Book Award. Padilla was supposed to receive the award on behalf of the authors.

Political offices
Preceded by Ruth Raña Padilla	Governor of Nueva Vizcaya; 2016–2023	Succeeded by Jose Gambito
House of Representatives of the Philippines
Preceded by Rodolfo Agbayani	Member of the House of Representatives from Nueva Vizcaya's at-large district 2007–2016	Succeeded by Luisa Cuaresma
Preceded by Leonardo B. Perez	Member of the House of Representatives from Nueva Vizcaya's at-large district 1995–2004	Succeeded by Rodolfo Agbayani
Preceded by Leonardo B. Perez	Member of the House of Representatives from Nueva Vizcaya's at-large district 1987–1992	Succeeded by Leonardo B. Perez
Preceded by Arnulfo Fuentebella	House Minority Leader; 2001–2004	Succeeded by Francis Escudero
