= Aritao =

Municipality in Nueva Vizcaya, Philippines

- Municipality
- Municipality of Aritao
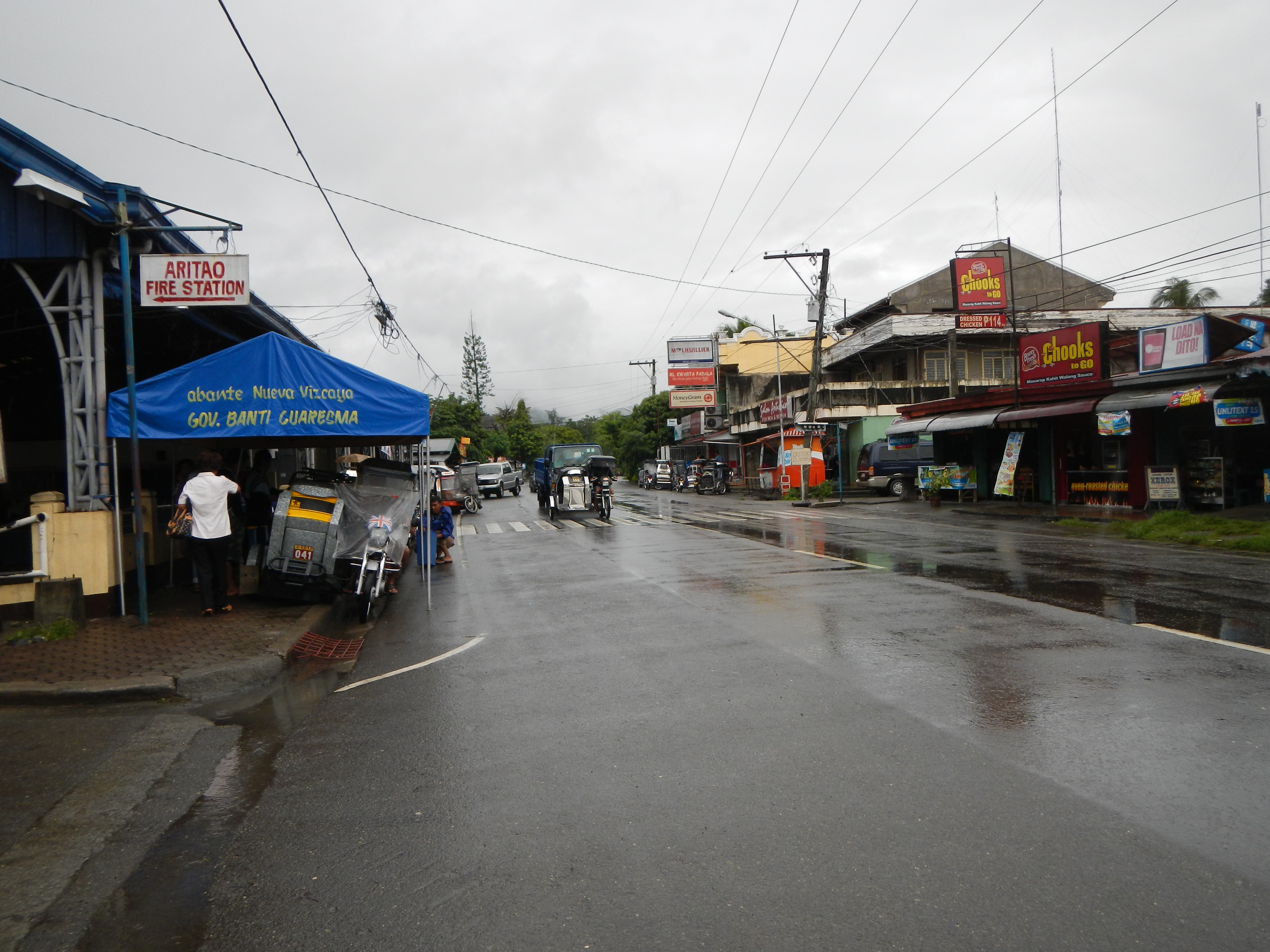
- Downtown area

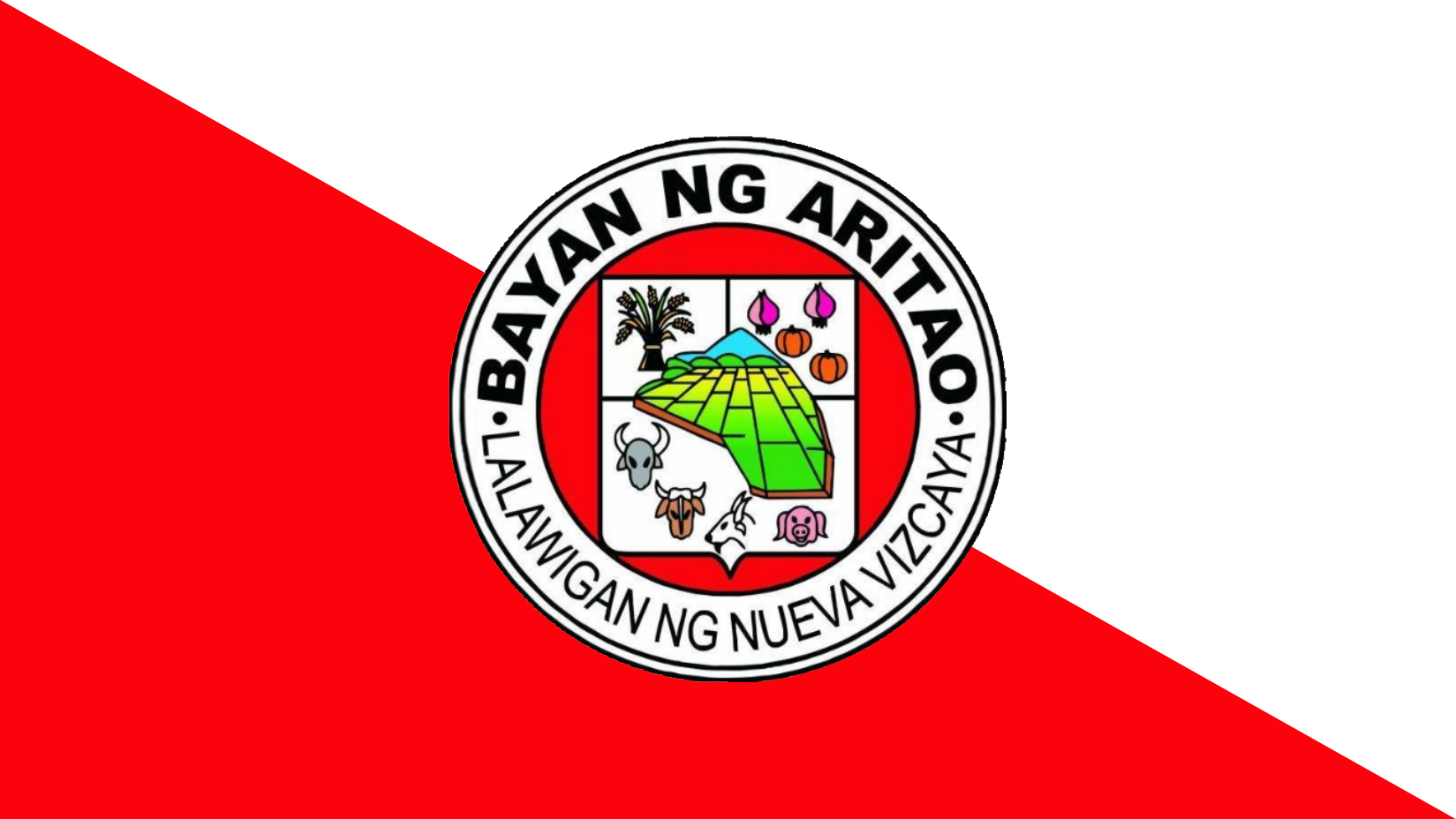
- Flag Seal

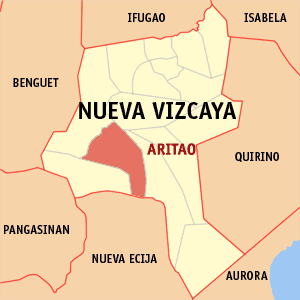
- Map of Nueva Vizcaya with Aritao highlighted
- Interactive map of Aritao
- Location within the Philippines
- Coordinates: 16°17′50″N 121°02′02″E
- Country: Philippines
- Region: Cagayan Valley
- Province: Nueva Vizcaya
- District: Lone district
- Barangays: 22 (see Barangays)

Government
  - Type: Sangguniang Bayan
  - Mayor: Remelina M. Peros
  - Vice Mayor: Jayson Ferrer.
  - Representative: Luisa L. Cuaresma
  - Electorate: 23,707 voters (2025)

Area
  - Total: 265.60 km^{2} (102.55 sq mi)
- Elevation: 476 m (1,562 ft)
- Highest elevation: 846 m (2,776 ft)
- Lowest elevation: 346 m (1,135 ft)

Population (2024 census)
  - Total: 45,000
  - Density: 170/km^{2} (440/sq mi)
  - Households: 10,307

Economy
  - Income class: 1st municipal income class
  - Poverty incidence: 7.35% (2023)
  - Revenue: ₱ 271.6 million (2024)
  - Assets: ₱ 700.4 million (2024)
  - Expenditure: ₱ 241.3 million (2024)
  - Liabilities: ₱ 96.52 million (2024)

Service provider
  - Electricity: Nueva Vizcaya Electric Cooperative (NUVELCO)
- Time zone: UTC+8 (PST)
- ZIP code: 3704
- PSGC: 0205002000
- IDD : area code: +63 (0)78
- Native languages: Gaddang; Ilocano; Isinai; Kallahan; Tagalog
- Website: aritao.gov.ph

Aritao, officially the Municipality of Aritao (Gaddang: Ili na Aritao; Ilocano: Ili ti Aritao; Tagalog: Bayan ng Aritao), is a municipality in the province of Nueva Vizcaya, Philippines. According to the 2024 census, it has a population of 45,000 people.

The ethnic minority called Isinai (the same term for the local spoken language) were the original residents of this town.

== Etymology ==
The name Aritao came from the Isinai phrase Ari Tau "which stands for "Our King" (ari means king and tau means our) which refers to the legendary Isinai Chieftain Mengal, a fierce and brave king who resisted the Spanish conquest of the Isinai territories around Ajanas and Ynordenan (the areas comprising what is now most of Aritao).

== History ==
The town of Aritao was previously called Ajanas or Afanas. It was formerly the site of an Igorot fortress that was overrun by the Spanish in 1745 which was then further fortified by the colonists. Prior to that, the Spaniards had already established their first permanent settlement in Nueva Vizcaya in 1714 in the town of Buhay, now Barangay Santa Clara. Afanas was later renamedto Aritao, after an Isinay word "Ari-Tau". In January 1767, the intrepid Spanish Missionary Manuel Corripio succeeded in persuading an Igorot King called Ari Mengal and his tribe to live in the town. These people were later converted into Christianity by Fr. Tomas Gutierrez. In 1776, there was a merger of Aritao with the settlements of Buhay, Mabatu and Pahipahi into one pueblo under the name of Aritao, which was approved by the colonial authorities, with the town center being confirmed to be in the old Aritao.

During the American Era on 30 June 1917, through the initiative of Councilor Jose Aleman, the application for township of Aritao to higher authorities was finally approved by the Secretary of the Interior.

During World War II, Japanese troops entered Aritao in 1942 and were pushed out by Allied forces in 1945 after heavy fighting in the village of Kirang, which lays on the foot of the Cordillera mountain trails leading to Baguio.

== Geography ==
Aritao is situated 30.04 kilometres (18.67 mi) from the provincial capital Bayombong, and 263.30 kilometres (163.61 mi) from the country's capital city of Manila.

=== Barangays ===
Aritao is politically subdivided into 22 barangays. Each barangay consists of puroks and some have sitios.

- Banganan
- Beti
- Bone North
- Bone South
- Calitlitan
- Comon
- Cutar
- Darapidap
- Kirang
- Nagcuartelan
- Poblacion
- Sta. Clara
- Tabueng
- Tucanon
- Anayo
- Baan
- Balite
- Canabuan
- Canarem
- Latar-Nocnoc-San Francisco
- Ocao-Capiniaan
- Yaway

=== Climate ===
Climate data for Aritao, Nueva Vizcaya
Month	Jan	Feb	Mar	Apr	May	Jun	Jul	Aug	Sep	Oct	Nov	Dec	Year
Mean daily maximum °C (°F)	26 (79)	28 (82)	29 (84)	31 (88)	30 (86)	29 (84)	28 (82)	28 (82)	28 (82)	28 (82)	28 (82)	27 (81)	28 (83)
Mean daily minimum °C (°F)	18 (64)	18 (64)	19 (66)	22 (72)	23 (73)	23 (73)	23 (73)	23 (73)	23 (73)	21 (70)	20 (68)	18 (64)	21 (69)
Average precipitation mm (inches)	21 (0.8)	28 (1.1)	34 (1.3)	58 (2.3)	160 (6.3)	179 (7.0)	226 (8.9)	225 (8.9)	215 (8.5)	168 (6.6)	59 (2.3)	32 (1.3)	1,405 (55.3)
Average rainy days	7.5	8.5	10.9	14.9	23.9	25.7	26.7	25.3	24.9	18.6	11.8	8.9	207.6
Source: Meteoblue

== Demographics ==
Population census of Aritao

Year	Pop.	±% p.a.
1903	477	—
1918	1,314	+6.99%
1939	6,208	+7.67%
1948	7,322	+1.85%
1960	11,209	+3.61%
1970	18,098	+4.90%
1975	19,075	+1.06%
1980	22,004	+2.90%

Year	Pop.	±% p.a.
1990	25,942	+1.66%
1995	29,151	+2.21%
2000	31,705	+1.82%
2007	34,206	+1.05%
2010	37,115	+3.01%
2015	37,225	+0.06%
2020	42,197	+2.67%
2024	45,000	+1.56%

Source: Philippine Statistics Authority

=== Language ===
Ilocano is the dominant dialect of Aritao.

== Economy ==
Poverty incidence of Aritao (%)

Source: Philippine Statistics Authority

== Government ==
=== Local government ===
Aritao is part of the lone congressional district of the province of Nueva Vizcaya. It is governed by a mayor, designated as its local chief executive, and by a municipal council as its legislative body in accordance with the Local Government Code. The mayor, vice mayor, and the municipal councilors are elected directly in polls held every three years.

=== Elected officials ===
Members of the Municipal Council (2022–2025)
Position	Name
Congressman	Luisa L. Cuaresma
Mayor	Remelina M. Peros-Galam
Vice-Mayor	Jayson E. Ferrer
Councilors	Ariel M. Tubiera
Councilors	Aura Bless Crisel F. Galindez
Councilors	Adonis J. Lejao
Councilors	Cyrus Will C. Cardenas
Councilors	Domingo B. Doculan Jr.
Councilors	Michael M. Villegas
Councilors	Bernel A. Prado
Councilors	Vincent L. Lopez

== Education ==
The Schools Division of Nueva Vizcaya governs the town's public education system. The division office is a field office of the DepEd in Cagayan Valley region. There are two schools district offices that govern all the public and private elementary and high schools throughout the municipality. These are Aritao East District, and Aritao West District.

=== Primary and elementary schools ===
- Anayo Primary School
- Aritao Central School
- Aritao Methodist Christian School
- Baan Elementary School
- Banganan Elementary School
- Baptist Christian Academy Comon Annex
- Baptist Christian Academy of Aritao
- Beti Elementary School
- Bone North Elementary School
- Bone South Elementary School
- Felix Saludo Elementary School
- Calitlitan Elementary School
- Canabuan Elementary School
- Canarem Primary School
- Comon Central School
- Cutar Elementary School
- Darapidap Elementary School
- Cesario M. Tubiera Elementary School
- Immaculate Conception Academy of Bone South (Elementary)
- Balite Elementary School
- Kirang Elementary School
- Kirang Elementary School Annex
- Latar Elementary School
- Nagcuartelan Elementary School
- Sta. Clara Elementary School
- Tabueng Elementary School
- Tucanon Elementary School
- Ukaw Elementary School
- Yaway Elementary School

=== Secondary schools ===
- Aritao National High School
- Immaculate Conception Academy of Bone South
- Nueva Vizcaya Institute
- Sta. Clara High School
- Southern Cagayan Valley School of Technology
- St. Teresita's Academy of Aritao

== Gallery ==
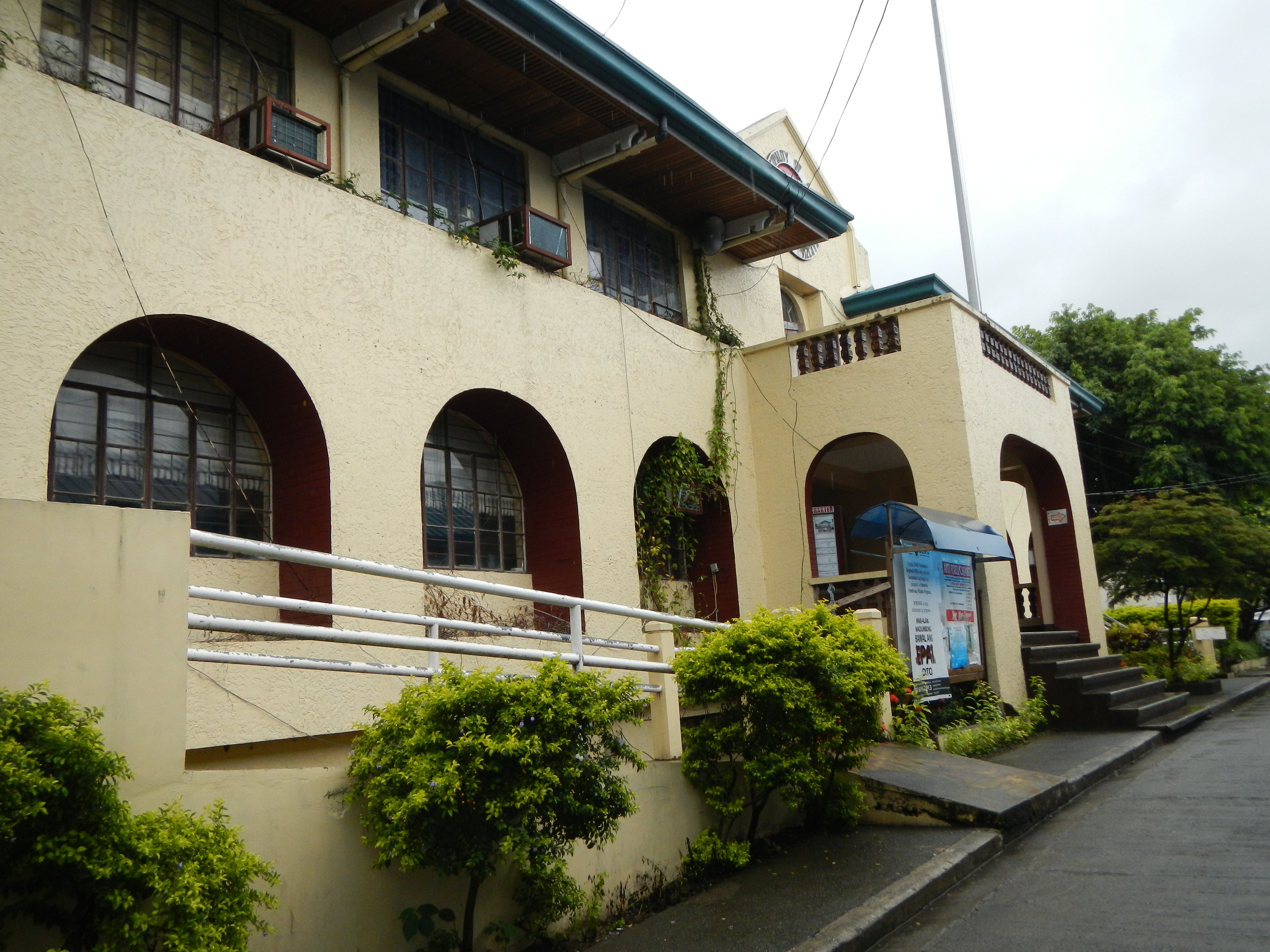
Aritao Townhall and Town Plaza

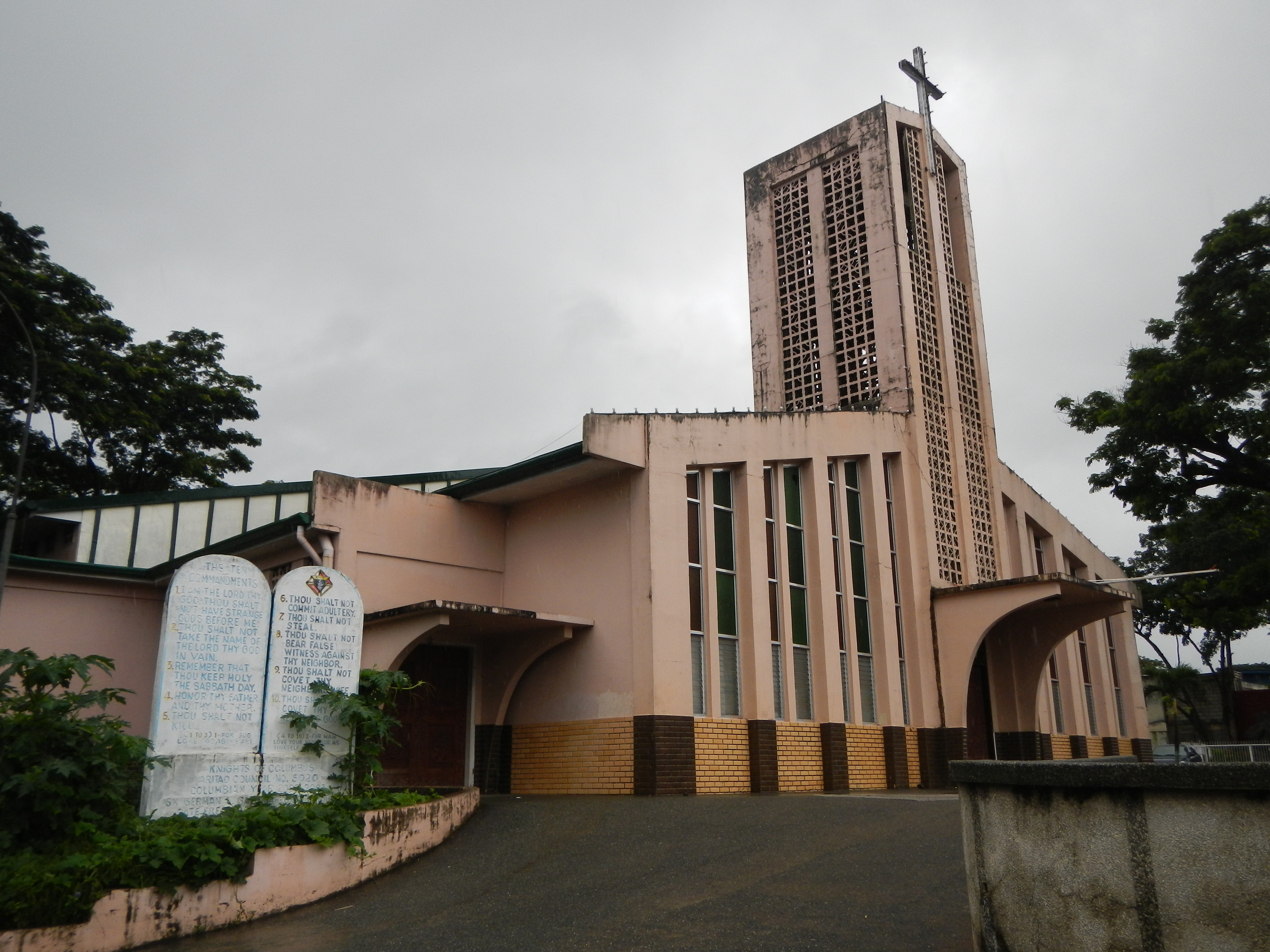
Saint Joseph, Husband of Mary Parish Church

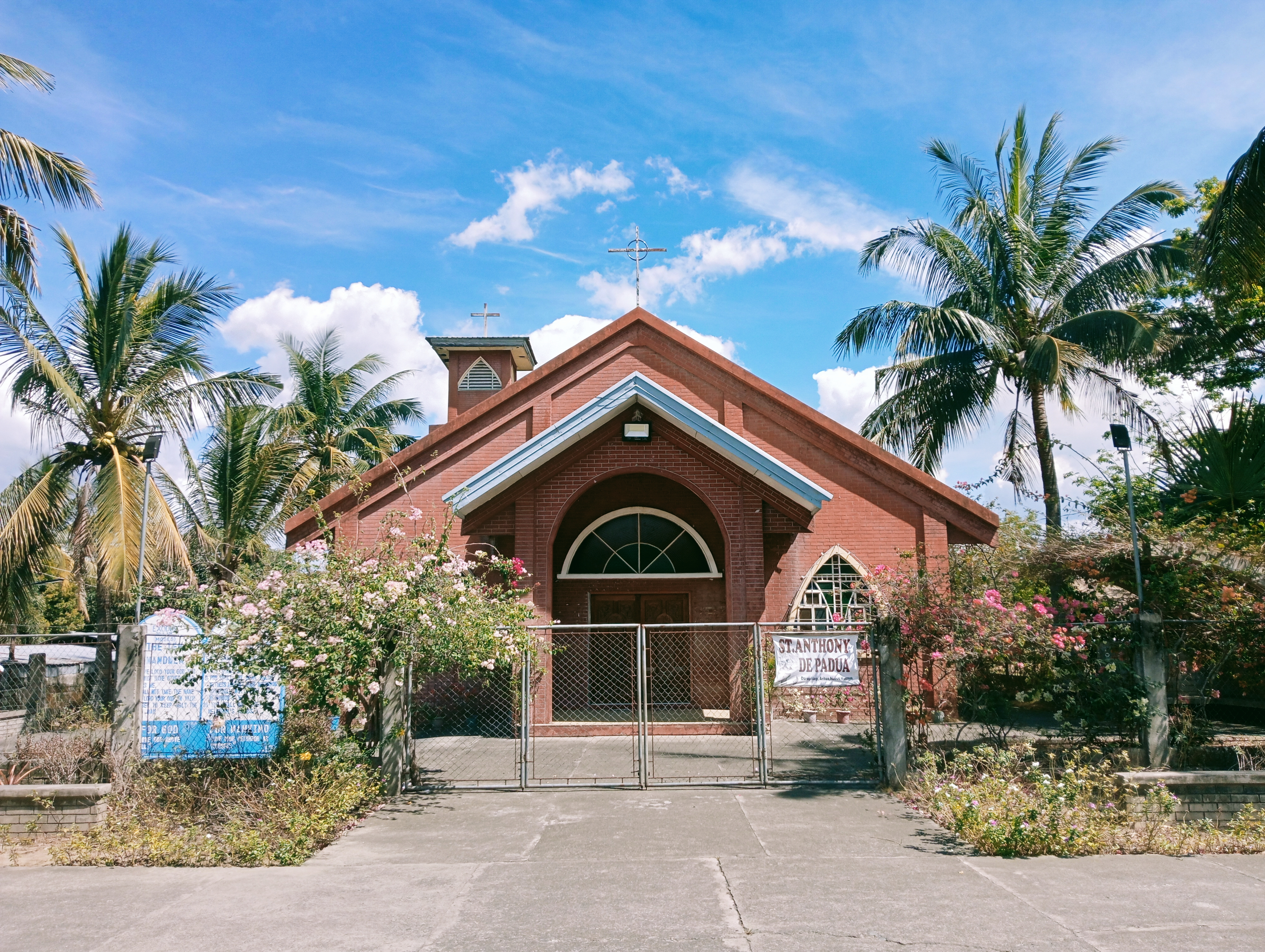
St. Anthony de Padua Chapel

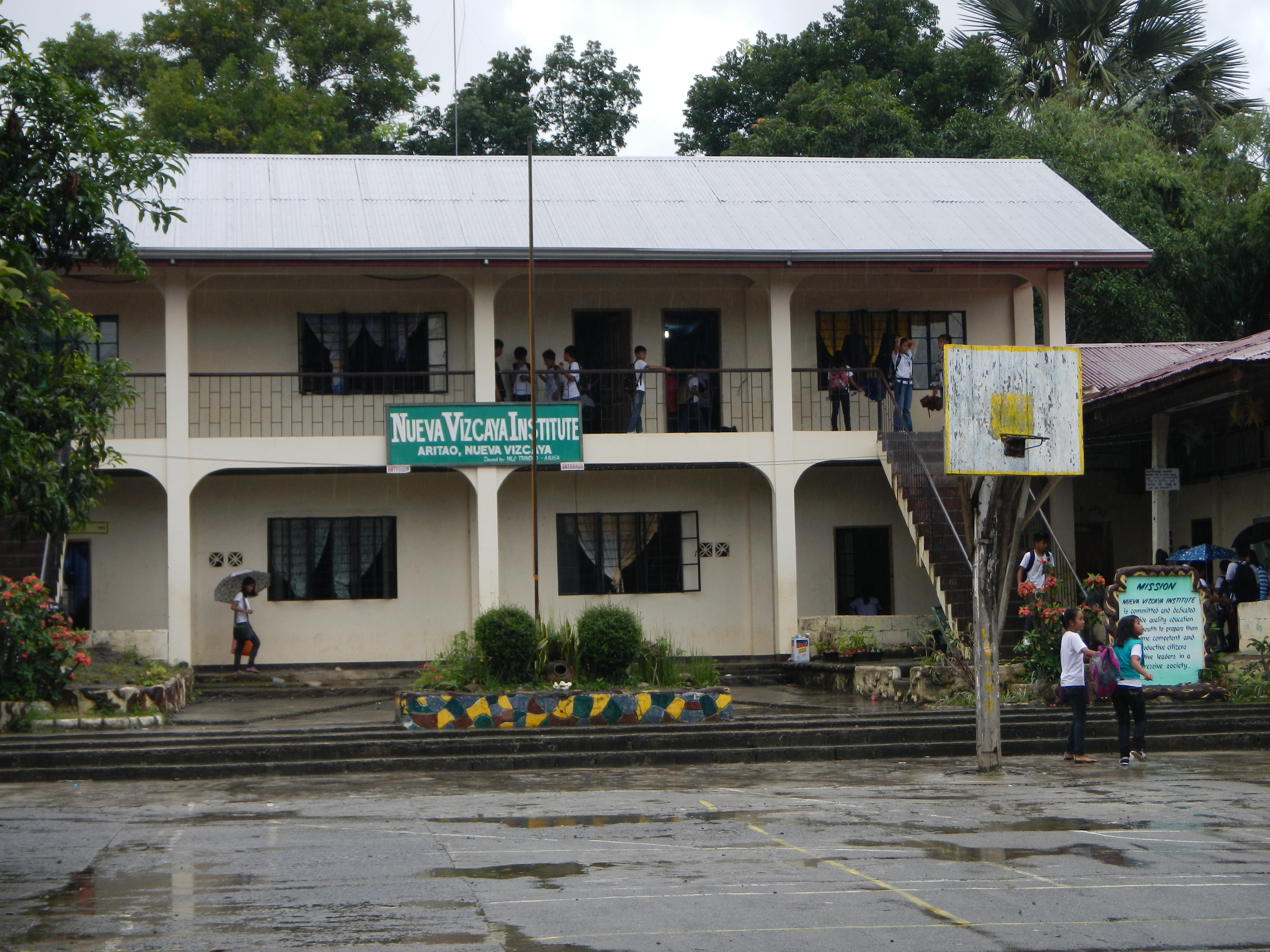
Nueva Vizcaya Institute

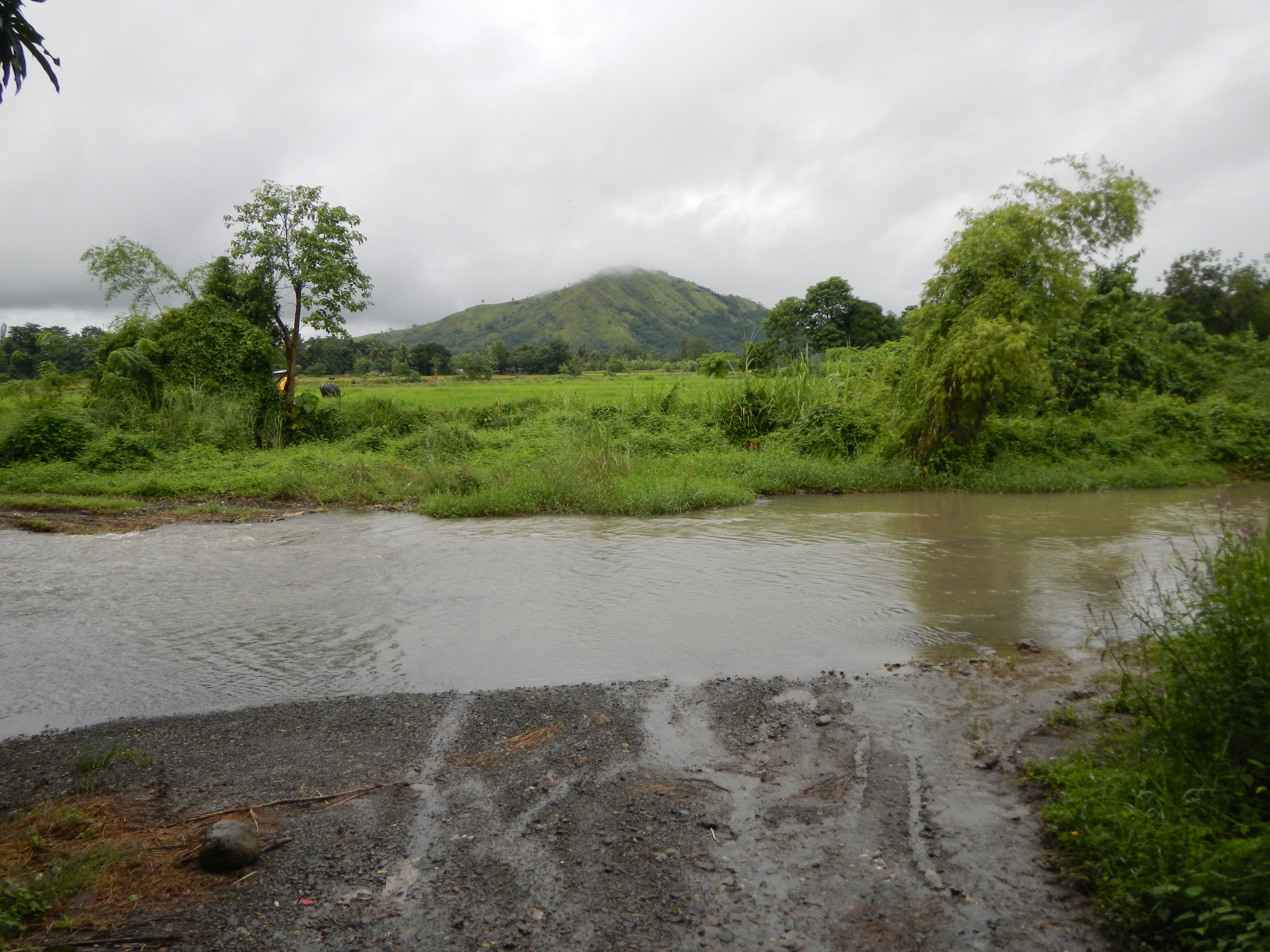
Twin (Skull and Salakot) mountains (visible from Aritao Townhall)
