= Jose Gambito =

Governor of Nueva Vizcaya, Philippines since 2023

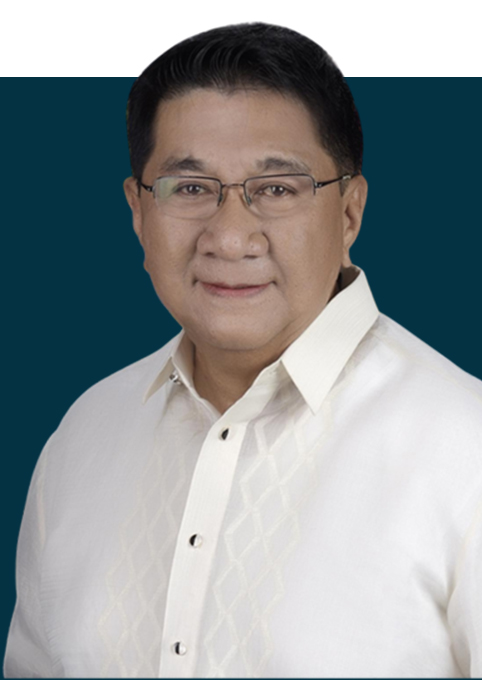

21st Governor of Nueva Vizcaya
- Incumbent
- Assumed office May 5, 2023
- Vice Governor: Eufemia Dacayo
- Preceded by: Carlos Padilla

Vice Governor of Nueva Vizcaya
- In office June 30, 2022 – May 5, 2023
- Governor: Carlos Padilla
- Preceded by: Jose Tomas
- Succeeded by: Eufemia Dacayo
- In office June 30, 2004 – June 30, 2013
- Governor: Luisa Cuaresma
- Preceded by: Luisa Cuaresma
- Succeeded by: Epifanio Lamberto Galima Jr.

Personal details
- Born: Jose Valeriano Gambito; July 10, 1953 (age 72) Solano, Nueva Vizcaya
- Party: PFP (2024–present)
- Other political affiliations: Lakas (2021-2024); NUP (2018-2021); UNA (2012-2018); Nacionalista (2009–2012); Abante Nueva Vizcaya (2007–2009)
- Education: University of the East
- Occupation: Politician, attorney

Jose "Jing" Valeriano Gambito (born July 10, 1953) is a Filipino politician and the current governor of the province of Nueva Vizcaya. A member of the Lakas–CMD, he served as the vice governor twice from 2004 to 2013 and from 2022 to 2023. On May 5, 2023, he was sworn in as the governor upon the death of Carlos M. Padilla. He was elected governor in his own right in the 2025 Philippine general election.

Political offices
Preceded by Carlos Padilla	Governor of Nueva Vizcaya; 2023–present	Incumbent
Preceded by Jose Tomas	Vice Governor of Nueva Vizcaya; 2022–2023	Succeeded by Eufemia Dacayo
Preceded by Luisa Cuaresma	Vice Governor of Nueva Vizcaya; 2004–2013	Succeeded by Epifanio Lamberto Galima Jr.
