= 2025 Nueva Vizcaya local elections =

Philippine elections

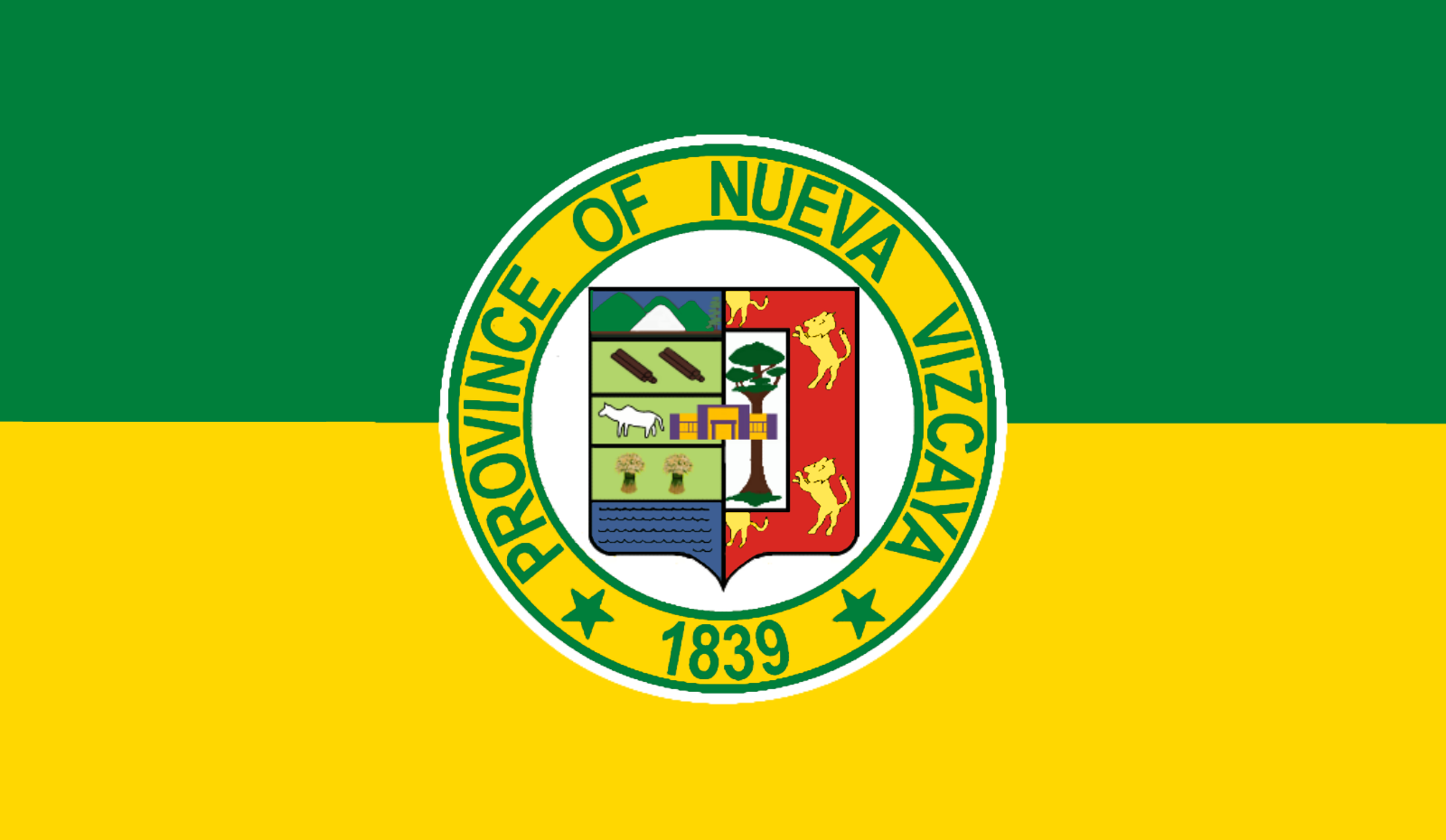
- May 12, 2025
- Gubernatorial election
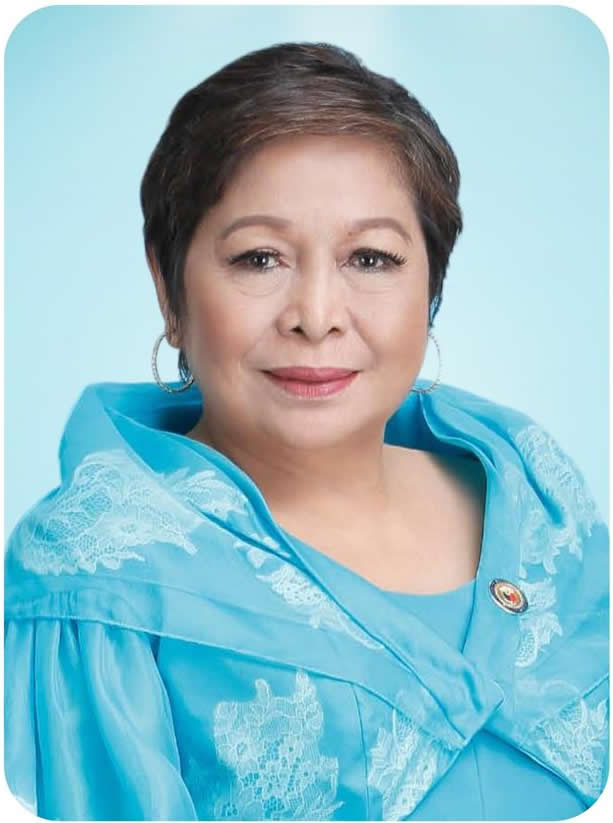
			IND
Candidate	Jose Gambito	Luisa Cuaresma	Maybelle Blossom Dumlao
Party	PFP	UNA	Independent
Running mate	Patricio Dumlao	Eduardo Balgos	None
Incumbent Governor
Jose Gambito
PFP
- Vice gubernatorial election
	Aksyon	NP	Lakas
Candidate	Eufemia Dacayo	Patricio Dumlao	Eduardo Balgos
Party	Aksyon	Nacionalista	Lakas
Incumbent Vice Governor
Eufemia Dacayo
Aksyon
- Provincial Board election
- 10 out of 14 seats in the Nueva Vizcaya Provincial Board; 8 seats needed for a majority
Party	Current seats
Nacionalista	4
Lakas	3
Aksyon	1
PFP	1
Vacant	1

Local elections were held in Nueva Vizcaya on May 12, 2025, as part of the 2025 Philippine general election. Nueva Vizcaya voters elected a governor, a vice governor, and 10 out of 14 members of the Nueva Vizcaya Provincial Board.

== Governor ==
Incumbent Jose Gambito (Partido Federal ng Pilipinas) ran for a first full term. Gambito became governor under Lakas–CMD on May 5, 2023, after Carlos Padilla died.

=== Candidates ===
The following candidates were included in the ballot:

No.	Candidate	Party
1	Luisa Cuaresma	United Nationalist Alliance
2	Maybelle Blossom Dumlao	Independent
3	Jose Gambito (incumbent)	Partido Federal ng Pilipinas

=== Results ===
Candidate	Party	Votes	%
Jose Gambito (incumbent)	Partido Federal ng Pilipinas	151,296	61.64
Luisa Cuaresma	United Nationalist Alliance	82,192	33.48
Maybelle Blossom Dumlao	Independent	11,980	4.88
Total		245,468	100.00

== Vice governor ==
Incumbent Eufemia Dacayo (Aksyon Demokratiko) ran for a first full term. Dacayo became vice governor under Lakas–CMD on May 5, 2023, after Jose Gambito became governor upon Carlos Padilla's death.

=== Candidates ===
The following candidates were included in the ballot:

No.	Candidate	Party
1	Eduardo Balgos	Lakas–CMD
2	Eufemia Dacayo (incumbent)	Aksyon Demokratiko
3	Patricio Dumlao	Nacionalista Party

=== Results ===
Candidate	Party	Votes	%
Eufemia Dacayo (incumbent)	Aksyon Demokratiko	96,129	40.30
Eduardo Balgos	Lakas–CMD	72,869	30.55
Patricio Dumlao	Nacionalista Party	69,509	29.14
Total		238,507	100.00

== Provincial Board ==
The Nueva Vizcaya Provincial Board is composed of 14 board members, 10 of whom are elected.

=== Retiring and term-limited board members ===
The following board members retiref:

- Florante Gerdan (Aksyon Demokratiko, 1st provincial district), ran for the House of Representatives as a nominee of the Gonzales-Sadicon faction of the Ako OFW party-list.

The following board members are term-limited:

- Eduardo Balgos (Lakas–CMD, 1st provincial district), ran for vice governor of Nueva Vizcaya
- Roland Carub (Lakas–CMD, 2nd provincial district), ran for Municipal Councilor of Solano.
- Patricio Dumlao (Nacionalista Party, 2nd provincial district), ran for vice governor of Nueva Vizcaya.
- Elma Pinao-an-Lejao (Nacionalista Party, 1st provincial district), ran for Mayor of Aritao.
- Delbert Tidang (Nacionalista Party, 1st provincial district), ran for Municipal Councilor of Santa Fe.

=== Vacancies ===
- Eufemia Dacayo (Aksyon Demokratiko, 2nd provincial district), assumed office as vice governor on May 5, 2023, after Jose Gambito became governor upon Carlos Padilla's death.

=== Overview ===
Party	Votes	%	Seats
Nacionalista Party	299,393	32.58	5
Lakas–CMD	297,920	32.42	2
Aksyon Demokratiko	109,223	11.88	1
Partido Federal ng Pilipinas	109,133	11.87	1
United Nationalist Alliance	49,958	5.44	1
Kilusang Bagong Lipunan	20,584	2.24	–
Independent	32,823	3.57	–
Total	919,034	100.00	10

=== 1st provincial district ===
Nueva Vizcaya's 1st provincial district consists of the municipalities of Alfonso Castañeda, Aritao, Bambang, Dupax del Norte, Dupax del Sur, Kayapa, Kasibu and Santa Fe. Five board members are elected from this provincial district.

==== Candidates ====
The following candidates were included in the ballot:

No.	Candidate	Party
1	Sammy Balinhawang	Aksyon Demokratiko
2	Luis Binay-an Sr.	Lakas–CMD
3	Clem Cadoy	Nacionalista Party
4	LC Cuaresma	United Nationalist Alliance
5	Edgar Daniel Jr.	Lakas–CMD
6	Myrna Dupiano	Aksyon Demokratiko
7	EJ Galanta-Martinez	Nacionalista Party
8	Pablo Kindot (independent)	Lakas–CMD
9	Adonis Lejao	Nacionalista Party
10	Paul Ligmayo	Partido Federal ng Pilipinas
11	Benjamin Lucas Jr.	Lakas–CMD
12	Jun Padilla	Nacionalista Party
13	Efren Quiben	Kilusang Bagong Lipunan
14	Leah Tidang	Aksyon Demokratiko
15	Jonathan Tindaan	Independent

==== Results ====
Candidate	Party	Votes	%
LC Cuaresma	United Nationalist Alliance	49,958	11.00
Leah Tidang	Aksyon Demokratiko	42,977	9.46
Clem Cadoy	Nacionalista Party	41,625	9.16
EJ Galanta-Martinez	Nacionalista Party	36,244	7.98
Pablo Kindot (independent)	Lakas–CMD	34,891	7.68
Luis Binay-an Sr.	Lakas–CMD	33,481	7.37
Jun Padilla	Nacionalista Party	32,527	7.16
Benjamin Lucas Jr.	Lakas–CMD	29,724	6.54
Paul Ligmayo	Partido Federal ng Pilipinas	27,613	6.08
Adonis Lejao	Nacionalista Party	27,557	6.07
Edgar Daniel Jr.	Lakas–CMD	26,250	5.78
Efren Quiben	Kilusang Bagong Lipunan	20,584	4.53
Jonathan Tindaan	Independent	19,251	4.24
Myrna Dupiano	Aksyon Demokratiko	15,910	3.50
Sammy Balinhawang	Aksyon Demokratiko	15,629	3.44
Total		454,221	100.00

=== 2nd provincial district ===
Nueva Vizcaya's 2nd provincial district consists of the municipalities of Ambaguio, Bagabag, Bayombong, Diadi, Quezon, Solano and Villaverde. Five board members are elected from this provincial district.

==== Candidates ====
The following candidates were included in the ballot:

No.	Candidate	Party
1	John Bagasao	Lakas–CMD
2	Dionisio Bungihan	Aksyon Demokratiko
3	Jimmy Calata	Lakas–CMD
4	Milady Dickson	Lakas–CMD
5	Amado Dumelod	Independent
6	Jose Evangelista	Lakas–CMD
7	Eunice Galima-Gambol (incumbent)	Nacionalista Party
8	Poly Garing	Aksyon Demokratiko
9	Flodemonte Gerdan	Nacionalista Party
10	Riz Guntalilib	Independent
11	Primo Percival Marcos (incumbent)	Partido Federal ng Pilipinas
12	Airene Pinkihan-Nisperos	Independent
13	Wilson Salas	Nacionalista Party
14	Omar Santos	Partido Federal ng Pilipinas
15	Byron Sevillena	Lakas–CMD
16	Domeng Torio	Independent

==== Results ====
Candidate	Party	Votes	%
Eunice Galima-Gambol (incumbent)	Nacionalista Party	70,999	15.27
John Bagasao	Lakas–CMD	56,175	12.09
Primo Percival Marcos (incumbent)	Partido Federal ng Pilipinas	51,734	11.13
Wilson Salas	Nacionalista Party	45,830	9.86
Flodemonte Gerdan	Nacionalista Party	44,611	9.60
Milady Dickson	Lakas–CMD	41,380	8.90
Omar Santos	Partido Federal ng Pilipinas	29,786	6.41
Byron Sevillena	Lakas–CMD	27,417	5.90
Jose Evangelista	Lakas–CMD	27,133	5.84
Dionisio Bungihan	Aksyon Demokratiko	21,223	4.57
Jimmy Calata	Lakas–CMD	16,730	3.60
Poly Garing	Aksyon Demokratiko	13,484	2.90
Riz Guntalilib	Independent	5,329	1.15
Amado Dumelod	Lakas–CMD	4,739	1.02
Domeng Torio	Independent	4,477	0.96
Airene Pinkihan-Nisperos	Independent	3,766	0.81
Total		464,813	100.00
