= List of barangays in Nueva Vizcaya =

The province of Nueva Vizcaya has 275 barangays comprising its 15 towns.

== Barangays ==
Most populous in its respective town (as of 2010)

Barangay	Population					Town
Barangay	2010	2007	2000	1995	1990	Town
Abaca	498	473	385	195	214	Dupax del Sur
Abian	1,581	1,403	1,304	1,203	954	Bambang
Abinganan	1,038	927	915	813	774	Bambang
Abuyo	1,356	1,138	621	902	878	Alfonso Castañeda
Acacia	736	932	903	812	722	Kayapa
Aggub	2,762	2,732	2,419	2,101	2,057	Solano
Alang-Salacsac	469	441	473	505	486	Kayapa
Aliaga	1,596	1,371	1,135	976	839	Bambang
Alimit	829	786	860	862	662	Kasibu
Alloy	951	1,167	799	967	740	Kasibu
Almaguer North	1,619	1,492	1,380	1,025	1,000	Bambang
Almaguer South	1,872	1,885	1,720	1,550	1,547	Bambang
Amilong-Labeng	185	271	219	198	297	Kayapa
Ammueg	1,850	1,568	1,516	1,249	898	Ambaguio
Ampakling	600	574	541	411	280	Diadi
Anayo	447	489	361	358	315	Aritao
Ansipsip	197	187	217	344	160	Kayapa
Antutot	1,287	1,051	868	984	637	Kasibu
Arwas	759	694	695	634	669	Diadi
Atbu	530	536	406	431	357	Santa Fe
Aurora	1,384	1,187	1,059	434	640	Quezon
Baan	540	513	377	304	211	Aritao
Baan	751	760	785	686	502	Kayapa
Babadi	1,043	862	803	661	609	Kayapa
Bacneng	1,296	1,245	1,160	858	402	Santa Fe
Bagahabag	3,056	3,064	2,119	1,578	1,296	Solano
Bagumbayan	877	908	1,049	702	663	Dupax del Sur
Bakir	989	899	681	710	635	Bagabag
Balangabang	453	364	393	371	449	Kayapa
Balete	588	1,158	472	702	1,060	Kayapa
Balete	1,170	1,042	1,232	1,157	1,161	Diadi
Balete	614	600	569	484	398	Santa Fe
Baliling	1,821	1,744	1,805	1,791	1,560	Santa Fe
Balite	542	576	515	463	359	Aritao
Balsain	673	669	661	632	536	Dupax del Sur
Banao	583	616	632	620	729	Kayapa
Bangaan	1,108	975	918	784	757	Solano
Banganan	3,044	2,778	2,388	1,937	1,724	Aritao
Bangar	1,040	969	844	925	558	Solano
Banggot (Poblacion)	4,301	4,025	4,514	4,090	4,621	Bambang
Banila	678	739	835	640	587	Dupax del Sur
Bansing	792	798	709	710	611	Bayombong
Bantinan	1,199	1,074	1,221	967	726	Santa Fe
Baracbac	607	537	456	409	344	Santa Fe
Barat	1,615	1,514	1,458	1,304	1,139	Bambang
Baresbes	1,383	1,167	1,005	917	703	Quezon
Baretbet	4,829	4,377	3,512	3,238	2,821	Bagabag
Bascaran	3,363	3,467	3,045	2,988	3,099	Solano
Belance	2,633	1,846	2,055	1,981	1,792	Dupax del Norte
Besong	597	550	500	499	476	Kayapa
Beti	1,905	1,666	1,555	1,510	1,328	Aritao
Bilet	373	414	319	308	290	Kasibu
Binalian	779	701	667	616	581	Kayapa
Binnuangan	1,816	1,398	1,432	1,792	1,720	Dupax del Norte
Binogawan	892	906	669	639	494	Kasibu
Bintawan Norte	2,497	2,314	1,997	1,670	1,851	Villaverde
Bintawan Sur	2,756	2,658	2,578	2,354	2,353	Villaverde
Biruk	814	709	651	545	499	Dupax del Sur
Bitnong	2,473	2,233	2,240	2,065	2,064	Dupax del Norte
Biyoy	1,633	1,451	1,442	1,241	1,116	Kasibu
Bone North	2,451	2,192	2,105	1,921	1,745	Aritao
Bone South	4,028	3,974	3,945	3,567	3,255	Aritao
Bonfal East	2,444	2,012	1,982	2,399	1,794	Bayombong
Bonfal Proper	4,600	4,526	3,978	3,759	3,350	Bayombong
Bonfal West	4,561	4,459	3,810	3,133	2,724	Bayombong
Bonifacio	929	563	520	424	372	Quezon
Bua	1,227	1,012	858	737	580	Kasibu
Buag (Poblacion)	3,248	3,662	3,031	2,755	2,674	Bambang
Buenavista (Vista Hills)	2,641	2,630	2,376	2,040	1,690	Bayombong
Bugnay	1,207	1,322	1,323	899	875	Diadi
Bulala	545	522	529	570	427	Dupax del Norte
Buliwao	2,541	2,534	2,191	1,767	1,614	Quezon
Busilac	2,673	2,708	2,590	2,118	1,829	Bayombong
Butao	992	903	904	756	860	Diadi
Buyasyas	364	358	321	336	263	Kayapa
Buyasyas	741	653	498	427	349	Santa Fe
Cabalatan-Alang	170	193	181	316	432	Kayapa
Cabanglasan	636	619	684	627	767	Kayapa
Cabayo	688	655	697	1,645	797	Kayapa
Cabuaan	893	766	730	736	650	Bayombong
Cabuluan	1,592	1,450	1,312	1,133	1,072	Villaverde
Calaocan	910	613	627	774	399	Quezon
Calaocan (Poblacion)	3,239	3,167	3,083	3,021	2,816	Bambang
Caliat (Poblacion)	1,769	1,861	1,581	1,590	1,373	Quezon
Calitlitan	2,200	1,984	1,617	1,518	1,398	Aritao
Camamasi	450	362	390	375	329	Kasibu
Camandag	1,437	1,287	1,092	1,244	804	Ambaguio
Canabay	908	781	739	695	567	Dupax del Sur
Canabuan	561	523	406	299	251	Aritao
Canabuan	1,285	1,189	282	1,148	960	Santa Fe
Canarem	800	718	747	577	443	Aritao
Capisaan	715	731	575	612	572	Kasibu
Careb	2,208	2,143	1,943	1,916	1,745	Bagabag
Carolotan	973	912	797	822	824	Dupax del Sur
Casat	1,518	1,433	1,427	1,238	1,126	Bayombong
Castillo Village	522	468	472	402	250	Kayapa
Catarawan	761	732	615	555	519	Kasibu
Cauayan	314	307	535	153	168	Alfonso Castañeda
Communal	2,021	2,078	1,640	1,766	1,242	Solano
Comon	3,933	3,836	3,312	3,273	2,946	Aritao
Concepcion (Calalabangan)	1,237	1,228	1,153	973	921	Solano
Cordon	1,129	1,132	1,027	907	721	Kasibu
Curifang	3,219	2,607	2,444	1,978	2,020	Solano
Cutar	1,870	1,542	1,594	1,367	1,252	Aritao
Dadap	1,022	795	871	570	925	Solano
Dagupan	1,064	851	770	697	604	Quezon
Darapidap	2,304	2,027	1,756	1,601	1,424	Aritao
Darubba	1,592	1,527	1,568	1,364	1,415	Quezon
Decabacan	674	624	580	602	455	Diadi
Didipio	2,066	2,095	1,354	1,202	1,005	Kasibu
Dine	1,261	1,246	1,002	880	644	Kasibu
District III Poblacion (Don M. Perez)	2,298	2,276	2,209	2,122	1,634	Bayombong
District IV (Poblacion)	3,042	2,769	2,836	2,881	2,150	Bayombong
Domang	1,363	1,454	1,487	1,284	1,191	Dupax del Sur
Don Domingo Maddela Poblacion (District I)	1,325	1,370	1,367	1,485	1,593	Bayombong
Don Mariano Marcos	2,159	2,253	2,132	2,204	1,714	Bayombong
Don Tomas Maddela Poblacion (District II)	1,176	1,452	1,426	1,411	1,463	Bayombong
Dopaj	1,773	1,752	1,665	1,489	1,380	Dupax del Sur
Dullao	1,114	1,011	920	855	683	Bambang
Dulli	1,520	1,219	1,072	1,204	1,201	Ambaguio
Duruarog	868	784	803	728	650	Diadi
Escoting	967	929	872	753	742	Diadi
Gabut	1,101	1,017	943	770	533	Dupax del Sur
Galintuja	777	833	271	714	721	Alfonso Castañeda
Ganao (Lingad)	942	1,007	921	826	725	Dupax del Sur
Homestead	3,305	2,960	2,529	2,288	1,722	Bambang
Ibung	4,234	4,060	4,107	3,785	3,757	Villaverde
Imugan	659	736	681	700	549	Santa Fe
Inaban	1,776	1,803	1,455	1,508	1,411	Dupax del Norte
Indiana	1,954	1,794	1,563	1,402	1,251	Bambang
Ineangan	3,696	3,377	3,378	3,116	2,908	Dupax del Norte
Ipil-Cuneg	460	466	405	375	320	Bayombong
Kakiduguen	748	782	667	563	482	Kasibu
Kayapa Proper East	225	237	204	250	287	Kayapa
Kayapa Proper West	1,110	1,045	962	851	906	Kayapa
Kimbutan	1,135	1,071	1,097	943	922	Dupax del Sur
Kinabuan	1,130	995	775	616	499	Dupax del Sur
Kirang	2,541	2,087	1,882	1,693	1,216	Aritao
Kongkong	2,044	2,001	1,827	1,445	1,195	Kasibu
La Torre North	1,766	1,860	1,660	1,598	1,403	Ambaguio
La Torre South	2,140	1,350	959	1,082	1,114	Ambaguio
Labang	1,684	1,543	1,226	1,225	1,208	Ambaguio
Lactawan	1,240	1,196	1,023	941	936	Solano
Lamo	1,267	1,711	1,466	1,464	1,416	Dupax del Norte
Langca	253	242	242	199	168	Diadi
Lantap	2,687	2,554	2,562	2,378	2,191	Bagabag
Latar-Nocnoc-San Francisco	483	461	382	293	252	Aritao
Latbang	848	1,023	782	1,081	1,094	Kayapa
Lawigan	794	839	744	738	422	Kayapa
Lipuga	379	352	261	171	118	Alfonso Castañeda
Lublub (Poblacion)	3,589	3,107	2,551	2,331	1,721	Alfonso Castañeda
Lukidnon	380	415	325	326	189	Dupax del Sur
Lupa	901	899	818	703	423	Kasibu
Lurad	482	471	426	380	408	Diadi
Luyang	1,140	1,025	2,007	780	702	Bayombong
Maasin	954	842	827	776	476	Quezon
Mabasa	2,100	2,112	2,064	1,781	1,744	Dupax del Norte
Mabuslo	2,249	2,320	2,092	1,617	1,848	Bambang
Macabenga	1,202	1,148	1,092	975	895	Dupax del Norte
Macalong	1,327	1,330	1,184	1,051	991	Kasibu
Macate	1,399	1,269	1,059	953	866	Bambang
Maddiangat	2,052	1,924	1,573	1,305	1,137	Quezon
Magapuy	946	880	800	921	578	Bayombong
Magsaysay	4,485	3,439	3,684	3,088	2,228	Bayombong
Magsaysay Hills	1,405	1,075	1,274	1,024	–	Bambang
Malabing	661	738	521	645	437	Kasibu
Malasin (Poblacion)	3,144	3,213	3,126	2,944	2,841	Dupax del Norte
Manamtam	659	643	597	583	412	Bambang
Mangayang	1,977	1,843	1,694	1,529	1,292	Dupax del Sur
Mapayao	1,584	1,258	1,167	1,039	919	Kayapa
Masoc	2,792	2,519	1,864	1,585	1,276	Bayombong
Mauan	1,126	1,070	1,130	879	824	Bambang
Munguia	1,261	1,184	1,053	994	952	Dupax del Norte
Murong	2,776	2,660	2,616	2,462	2,357	Bagabag
Muta	1,779	1,605	1,656	1,537	1,364	Kasibu
Nagbitin	2,052	1,883	1,721	1,549	1,478	Villaverde
Nagcuartelan	1,239	1,074	996	857	890	Aritao
Nagsabaran	1,127	1,072	1,105	770	608	Diadi
Nalubbunan	1,474	1,308	1,211	987	920	Quezon
Namamparan	1,118	978	798	685	532	Diadi
Nangalisan	1,662	1,184	1,187	1,043	992	Bagabag
Nansiakan	1,480	1,541	1,268	1,050	1,064	Kayapa
Nantawacan	1,820	1,700	1,784	1,396	1,193	Kasibu
Napo	1,468	1,227	1,139	1,073	568	Ambaguio
New Gumiad	337	355	430	393	337	Dupax del Norte
Ocao-Capiniaan	757	695	678	572	432	Aritao
Ocapon	911	878	789	618	538	Villaverde
Osmeña	5,391	5,358	4,991	4,471	4,031	Solano
Oyao	2,174	1,684	1,695	1,686	1,492	Dupax del Norte
Pacquet (Ilongot Res.)	1,022	904	870	821	621	Kasibu
Paitan	1,466	1,494	1,441	1,111	977	Bayombong
Palabotan	1,108	837	770	689	605	Dupax del Sur
Pallas	1,056	1,003	792	631	512	Bambang
Pampang (Poblacion)	975	852	845	718	667	Kayapa
Pangawan	639	507	453	434	442	Kayapa
Paniki	1,819	1,699	1,702	1,537	1,494	Bagabag
Pao	1,221	1,168	1,038	967	800	Kasibu
Papaya	894	817	746	760	584	Kasibu
Parai	735	758	632	432	580	Dupax del Norte
Pelaway	1,013	918	569	176	145	Alfonso Castañeda
Pieza	1,273	1,212	1,066	883	920	Villaverde
Pilar D. Galima	1,121	986	924	781	–	Solano
Pinayag	1,824	1,762	1,478	1,333	1,325	Kayapa
Pingkian	1,238	1,047	1,045	943	1,280	Kayapa
Pinya	616	552	506	565	469	Diadi
Poblacion	2,503	1,887	1,272	1,420	1,018	Ambaguio
Poblacion	1,059	1,080	1,208	1,052	1,298	Santa Fe
Poblacion	2,956	2,682	1,985	1,921	1,648	Diadi
Poblacion	3,992	3,983	4,025	4,170	4,102	Aritao
Poblacion (Alloy)	1,844	1,694	1,508	1,543	1,161	Kasibu
Poblacion (Turod)	975	1,009	640	528	554	Villaverde
Poblacion North	1,094	1,229	1,311	1,236	1,454	Solano
Poblacion South	825	1,302	1,411	1,491	1,781	Solano
Pogonsino	1,641	1,434	1,335	1,133	942	Bagabag
Pudi	1,281	1,288	1,176	1,062	1,102	Kasibu
Quezon	4,427	4,673	4,676	3,955	3,586	Solano
Quirino	6,233	7,198	7,022	6,650	6,312	Solano
Quirino (Poblacion)	1,507	1,375	1,386	1,262	1,207	Bagabag
Rosario	266	250	232	171	96	Diadi
Roxas	7,858	7,874	7,388	6,783	5,833	Solano
Runruno	3,333	3,110	3,054	2,909	2,553	Quezon
Salinas	2,445	2,322	2,307	2,079	1,959	Bambang
Salingsingan	1,270	979	836	684	632	Ambaguio
Salvacion	4,056	3,895	3,847	3,500	3,377	Bayombong
San Antonio North	1,795	1,501	988	847	829	Bambang
San Antonio South	1,504	1,558	1,302	1,280	1,220	Bambang
San Fabian	738	669	669	614	538	Kayapa
San Fernando	2,267	2,075	1,918	1,700	1,532	Bambang
San Geronimo (Poblacion)	1,536	1,506	1,436	1,293	1,490	Bagabag
San Juan	1,406	1,515	1,400	1,261	1,149	Solano
San Leonardo	1,629	1,504	1,379	1,294	1,172	Bambang
San Luis	2,086	1,953	1,802	1,659	1,993	Solano
San Luis	539	461	401	323	341	Diadi
San Nicolas North (Luyang)	2,154	2,277	2,053	1,709	1,642	Bayombong
San Pablo	756	706	635	453	423	Diadi
San Pedro (Poblacion)	2,186	2,195	2,091	1,949	1,745	Bagabag
Sanguit	840	837	775	700	610	Dupax del Sur
Santa Clara	1,151	1,134	1,100	1,139	918	Aritao
Santa Cruz	985	885	887	814	748	Bagabag
Santa Lucia	2,507	2,508	2,358	2,301	2,058	Bagabag
Santa Maria	517	530	522	317	279	Dupax del Sur
Santa Rosa	2,281	2,382	–	1,658	1,557	Bayombong
Santa Rosa	169	161	286	199	150	Santa Fe
Santo Domingo (Tabangan)	2,659	2,977	2,290	2,295	2,469	Bambang
Santo Domingo West	982	912	713	511	–	Bambang
Sawmill	1,430	1,159	1,182	911	1,071	Villaverde
Seguem	866	621	525	589	467	Kasibu
Sinapaoan	947	679	633	553	651	Santa Fe
Tabueng	520	472	424	376	359	Aritao
Tactac	921	879	762	615	544	Santa Fe
Tadji	854	717	702	699	485	Kasibu
Talbek	459	405	280	180	182	Dupax del Sur
Talecabcab	310	257	310	272	334	Kayapa
Tiblac	1,720	1,789	1,597	1,386	912	Ambaguio
Tidang Village	338	254	356	353	368	Kayapa
Tokod	361	420	566	527	407	Kasibu
Tuao North	1,770	1,860	1,457	1,307	1,244	Bagabag
Tuao South	2,065	1,993	–	2,037	1,870	Bagabag
Tubongan	589	380	491	360	459	Kayapa
Tucal	1,089	920	1,023	837	818	Solano
Tucanon	1,161	870	965	834	724	Aritao
Uddiawan	3,259	2,862	2,864	2,266	2,564	Solano
Unib	273	297	–	296	285	Santa Fe
Villa Aurora	399	504	460	383	334	Diadi
Villa Coloma (Poblacion)	2,786	2,293	2,187	2,013	1,809	Bagabag
Villa Florentino	735	777	634	679	632	Diadi
Villa Flores	2,061	1,763	1,771	1,642	1,136	Santa Fe
Villaros	1,509	1,222	1,230	886	680	Bagabag
Vista Alegre (B. Baringin)	3,608	3,378	2,880	2,672	2,384	Bayombong
Wacal	1,277	1,263	1,103	951	914	Solano
Wangal	992	820	786	627	492	Kasibu
Watwat	1,190	926	1,087	1,048	912	Kasibu
Yabbi	538	472	549	441	325	Dupax del Norte
Yaway	646	612	575	522	398	Aritao
Barangay	2010	2007	2000	1995	1990	Municipality
*Italicized names are former names.; *Dashes (–) in cells indicate unavailable census data.

[top]
