= Nueva Vizcaya =

Province in Cagayan Valley, Philippines

- Province
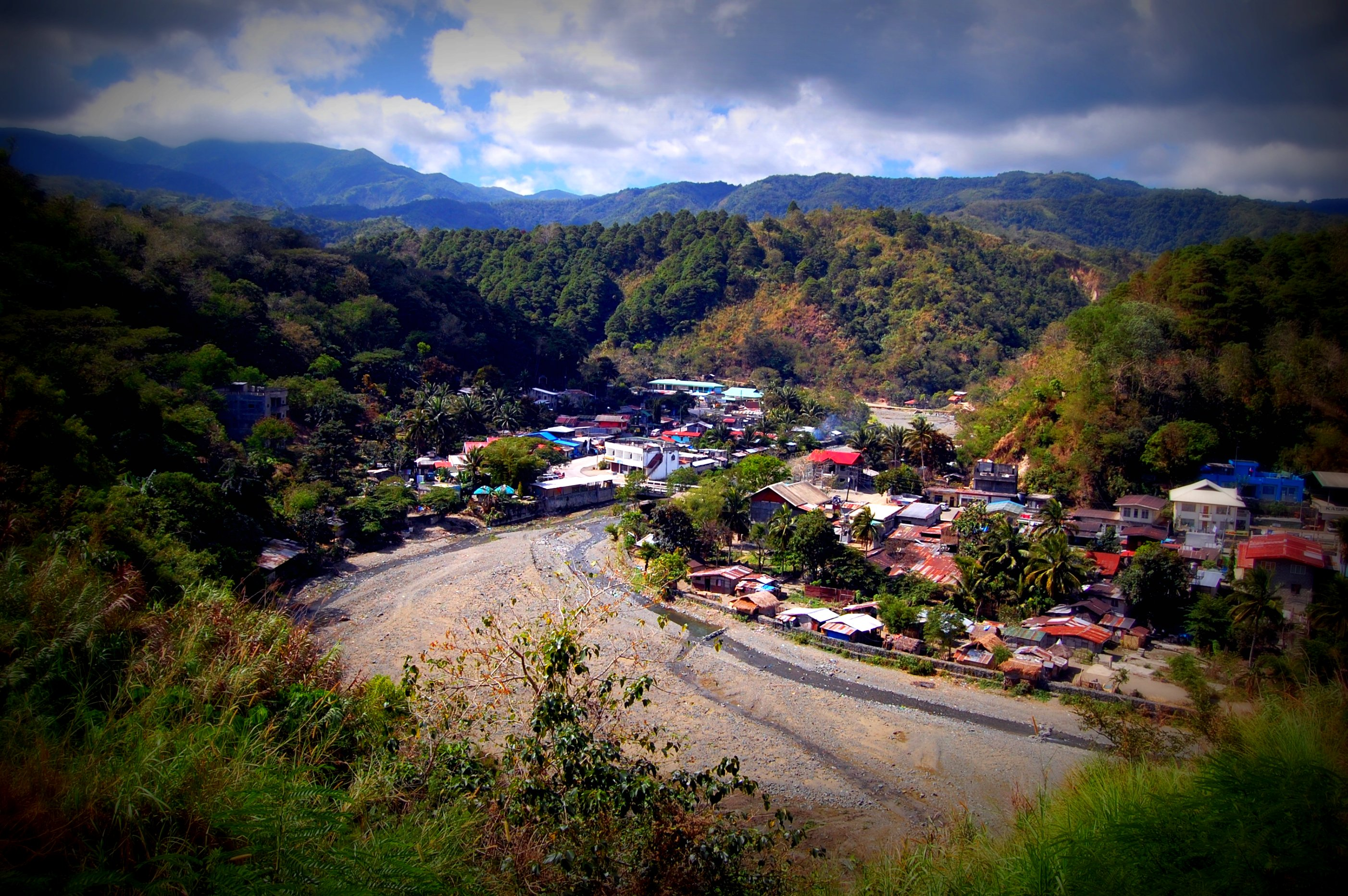
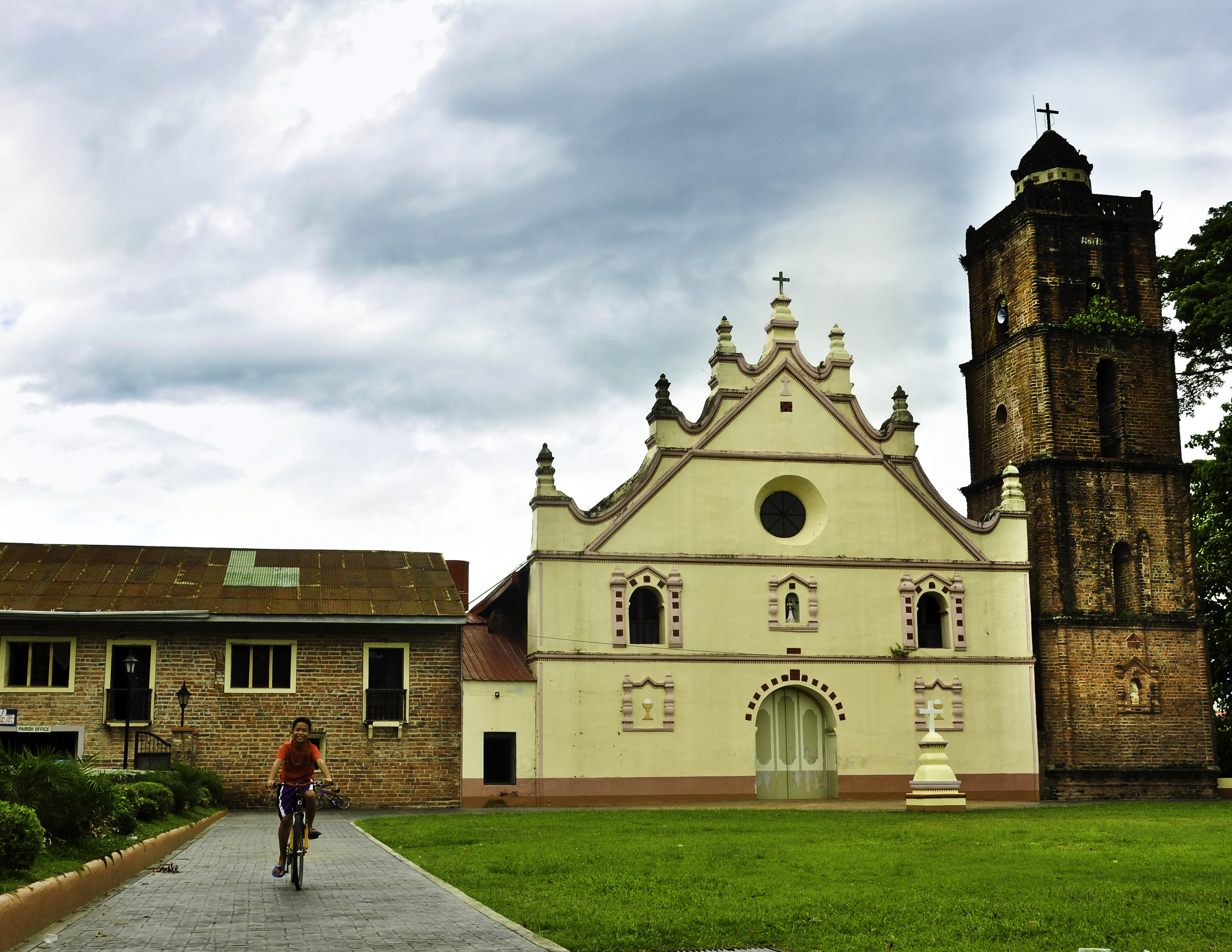
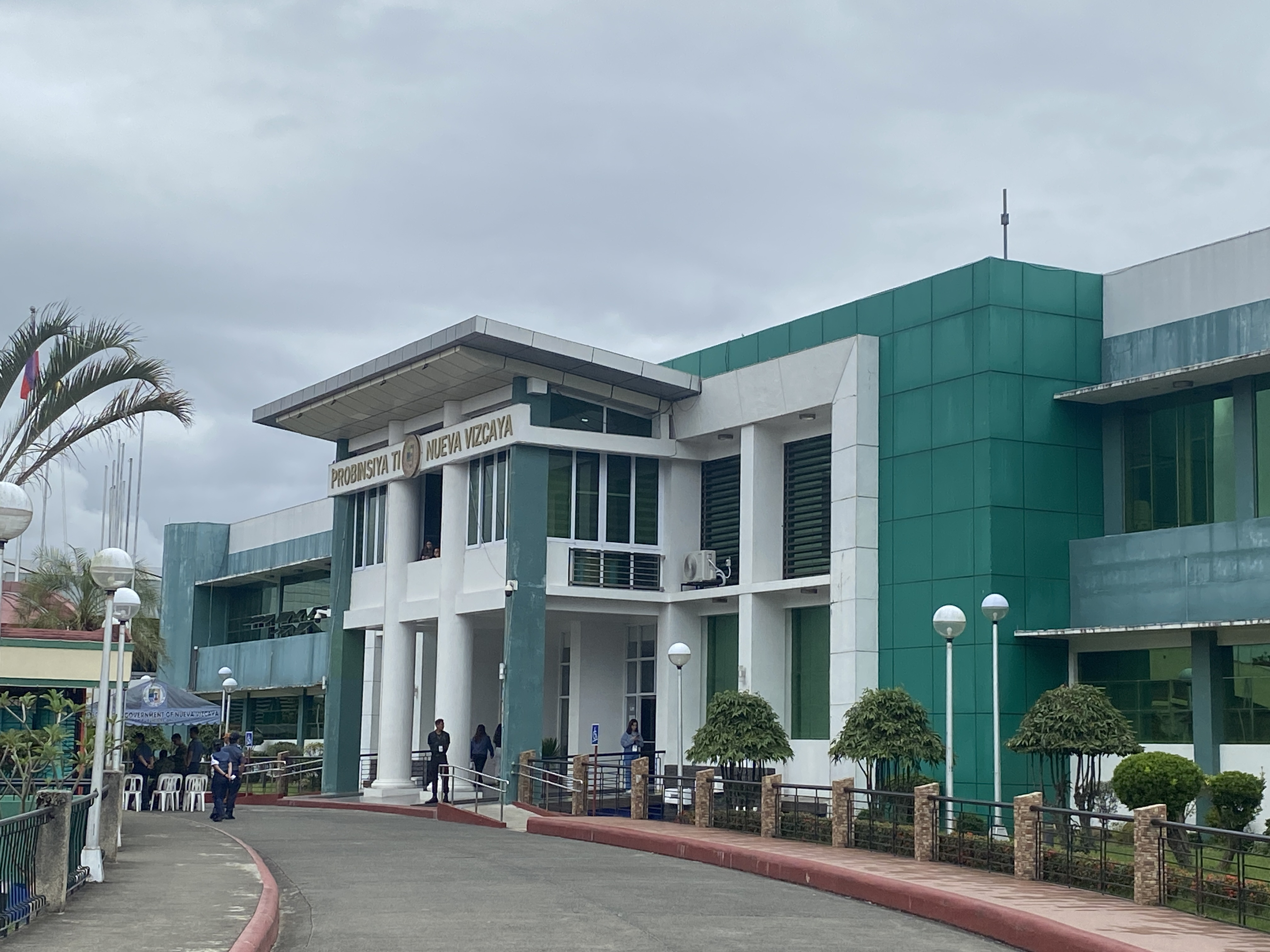
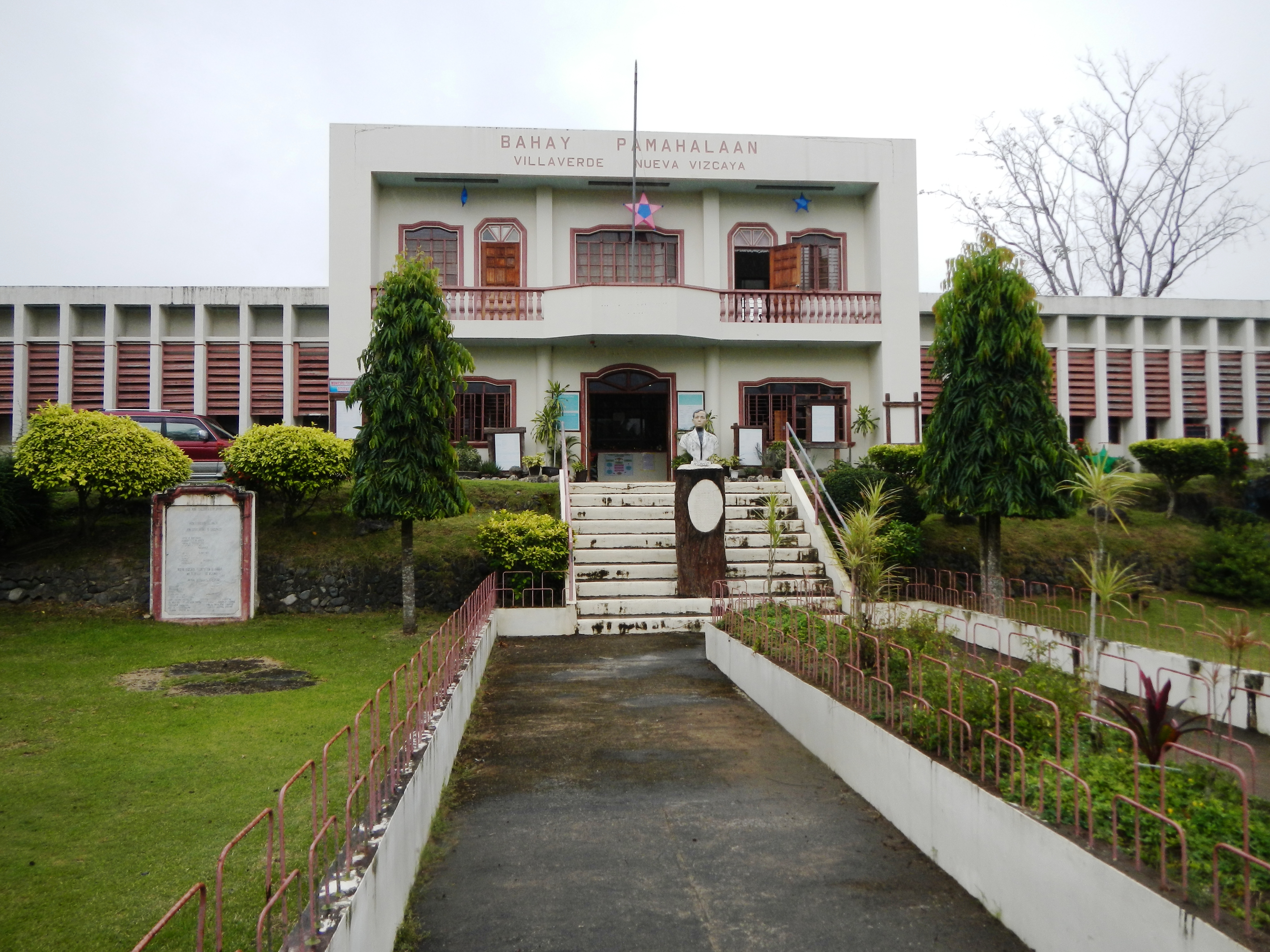
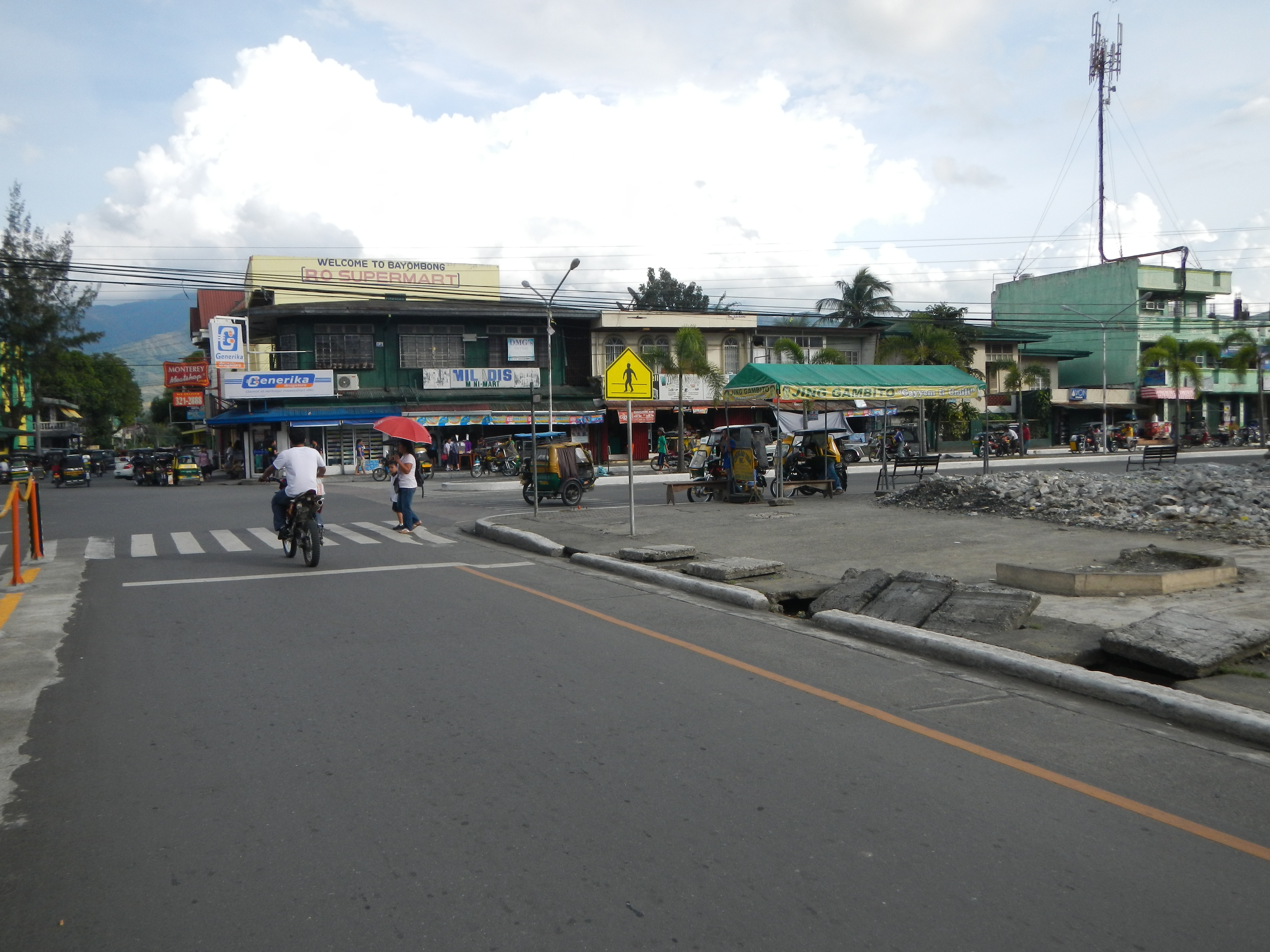
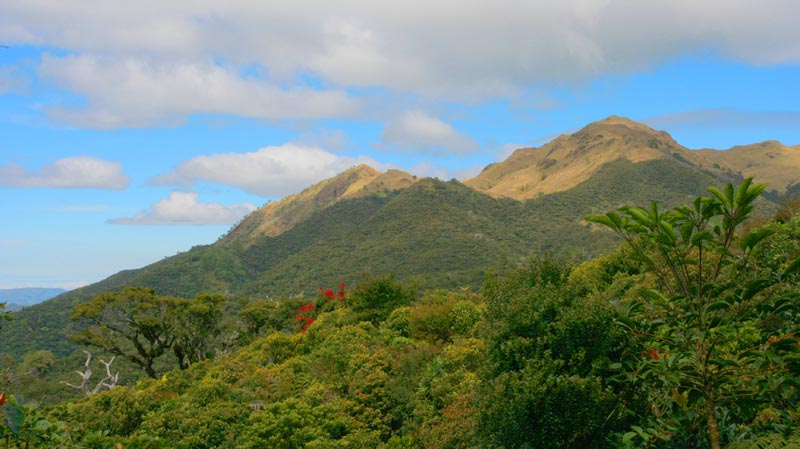
- (from top: left to right) Santa Fe, Dupax del Sur Church, Nueva Vizcaya Provincial Capitol, Villaverde Municipal Hall, Downtown Bayombong and Mount Pulag.

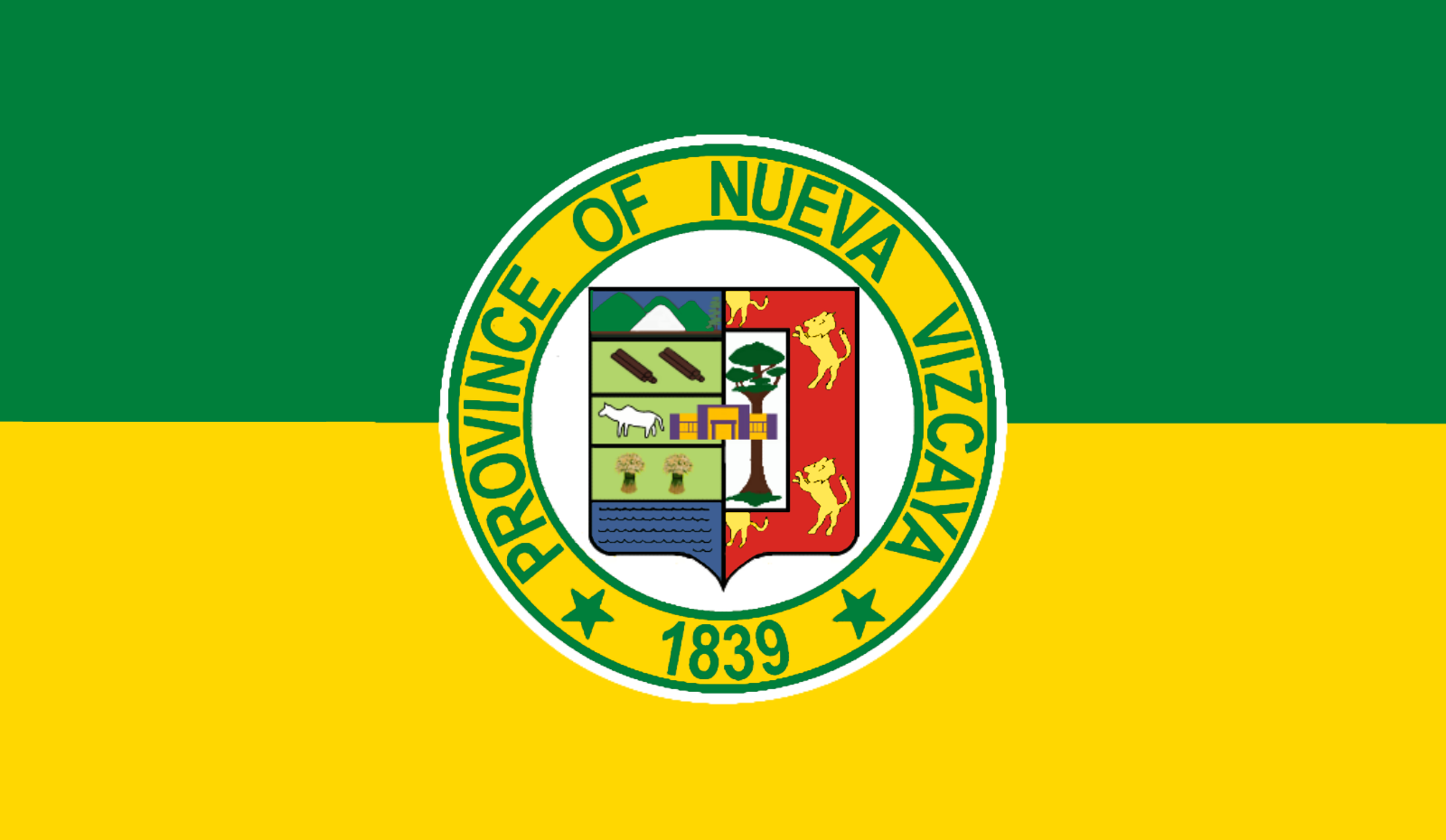
- Flag Seal
- Nicknames: Citrus Capital of the Philippines; Watershed Haven of Cagayan Valley
- Anthem: Vizcaya Hymn
- Location in the Philippines
- Interactive map of Nueva Vizcaya
- Coordinates: 16°29′N 121°09′E
- Country: Philippines
- Region: Cagayan Valley
- Founded: 1839
- Named for: Biscay, Spain
- Capital and largest municipality: Bayombong

Government
  - Type: Sangguniang Panlalawigan
  - Governor: Jose V. Gambito (PFP)
  - Vice Governor: Eufemia A. Dacayo (Aksyon)
  - Representative: Timothy Joseph Cayton (Aksyon)
  - Legislature: Nueva Vizcaya Provincial Board
  - Electorate: 303,090 voters (2025)

Area
  - Total: 4,813.88 km^{2} (1,858.65 sq mi)
  - Rank: 31st out of 82
- Highest elevation (Mount Pulag): 2,928 m (9,606 ft)

Population (2024 census)
  - Total: 530,106
  - Rank: 59th out of 82
  - Density: 110.120/km^{2} (285.210/sq mi)
  - Rank: 68th out of 82
  - Households: 128,181
- Demonyms: Novo Vizcayano (m/n); Novo Vizcayana (f)

Divisions
  - Independent cities: 0
  - Component cities: 0
  - Municipalities: 15: Alfonso Castañeda; Ambaguio; Aritao; Bagabag; Bambang; Bayombong; Diadi; Dupax del Norte; Dupax del Sur; Kasibu; Kayapa; Quezon; Santa Fe; Solano; Villaverde
  - Barangays: 275
  - Districts: Legislative district of Nueva Vizcaya

Economy
  - Income class: 1st provincial income class
  - Poverty incidence: 7.3% (2023)
  - Revenue: ₱ 2,307 million (2024)
  - Assets: ₱ 7,874 million (2024)
  - Expenditure: ₱ 2,116 million (2024)
  - Liabilities: ₱ 1,868 million (2024)
- Time zone: UTC+8 (PHT)
- PSGC: 025000000
- IDD : area code: +63 (0)78
- ISO 3166 code: PH-NUV
- Spoken languages: Ilocano; Pangasinan; Tagalog; Gaddang; Isinai; English
- Website: www.nuevavizcaya.gov.ph

Nueva Vizcaya, officially the Province of Nueva Vizcaya, (Note: Ilocano: Probinsia ti Nueva Vizcaya; Gaddang: Provinsia na Nueva Vizcaya; Pangasinan: Luyag/Probinsia na Nueva Vizcaya; Tagalog: Lalawigan ng Nueva Vizcaya [ˈnwɛva vɪsˈkaja]) is a landlocked province in the Philippines located in the Cagayan Valley region in Luzon. Its capital and largest town is Bayombong. It is bordered by Benguet to the west, Ifugao to the north, Isabela to the northeast, Quirino to the east, Aurora to the southeast, Nueva Ecija to the south, and Pangasinan to the southwest. Quirino province was created from Nueva Vizcaya in 1966.

== Etymology ==
The name Nueva Vizcaya is derived from the name of the province of Biscay (called Vizcaya in Spanish and Bizkaia in Basque) during the Spanish colonial period. This can be seen in the right part of the seal, a representation of the heraldry of Vizcaya in Spain.

== History ==
=== Spanish colonial era ===
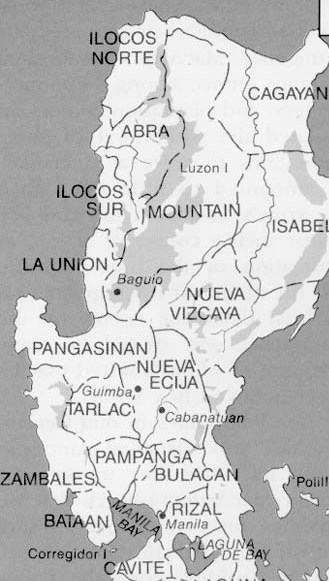
An old map showing the province and its original borders.

The areas of present-day Nueva Vizcaya used to be part of the vast Provincia de Cagayan. Organized religion in Nueva Vizcaya dates back to the year 1607, when the Dominican Order arrived in the province. It was not until 1609, however, that the first settlement of a religious order was established in the southern half of the province. In 1702, a convent was erected in Burubur at the foot of the Caraballo Mountains in Santa Clara, which is now a barangay in the town of Aritao. It was on this site that the first mass in Nueva Vizcaya was celebrated and the first baptism of a Christian convert was held.

Spanish conquest of Nueva Vizcaya was slow and difficult, and expeditions had to be sent recurrently due to the natives' refusal to accept Spanish sovereignty. In some of these expeditions, services of some local chieftains were used, the most famous of which was that commanded by Mariano Oscariz, in 1847–1848, which carried him clear through the province across to Palanan on the eastern coast of Luzon.

In 1818, Nueva Ecija annexed the towns of Palanan from Isabela, as well as Cagayan, Nueva Vizcaya, Quirino, Baler, Casiguran, Infanta (formerly called Binangonan de Lampon) and Polillo Islands from Tayabas, and part of Rizal. Bagabag when it was once part of Cagayan was also home to 10,808 native families and 25 Spanish-Filipino Mestizo families, before the province was transferred to the province of Nueva Vizcaya.

In 1839, upon the advice of the alcalde mayor of Cagayan, Luis Lardizabal, then-Governor General of the Philippines created the politico-military province of Nueva Vizcaya. The order was approved by a Royal Decree on April 10, 1841. The name Nueva Vizcaya was named after Biscay, Spain, the hometown of Lardizabal. The original province covered the areas of present-day Nueva Vizcaya, Quirino, Ifugao, Apayao, Kalinga, and Benguet, Batanes, a large portion of Isabela, as well as north Aurora. After Nueva Vizcaya was created, it included the present area occupied by the province plus present-day Mountain Province, much of Isabela, Quirino, & north Aurora.

Civil government was established in the province by the Philippine Commission in 1902 during the American Colonial Period of the Philippines.

The territories of Nueva Vizcaya were greatly reduced when Nueva Vizcaya ceded a big portion of its north-eastern territory, including Camarag, its first capital, now Echague, to form the province of Isabela in May 1856.

=== American colonial era ===
In 1908, the northwestern territory of Nueva Vizcaya was annexed to the newly organized sub-province of Ifugao. The survey executed by the Bureau of Lands in 1914 further caused the diminution of its area and reduced again upon the enactment of the Administrative Code of 1917. Northern areas of present-day Aurora (composed of present towns of Dilasag & part of Casiguran) were annexed to Tayabas (now Quezon) in 1905. In 1918, the area of modern Aurora north of Baler (composed of Dinalungan, Dipaculao, & Maria Aurora, besides Casiguran & Dilasag) was transferred to the authority of Nueva Vizcaya but returned to Tayabas in 1946.

The province of Nueva Vizcaya was also included in the 12th district of the Philippine Senate during the American period. The district included Mountain Province (present-day Apayao, Kalinga, Mountain Province, and Benguet), Cotabato (undivided), Agusan (undivided), Davao (undivided), Zamboanga (undivided), and Sulu (undivided). The province was included in the district because of its ethnic compatibility with Mountain Province and other indigenous domains in the Cordilleras and Mindanao.

=== Japanese occupation ===
During the Pacific War of the Second World War, the Japanese captured Nueva Vizcaya and established a "comfort station" in the province, where Filipino "comfort women" were enslaved, routinely gang-raped, and murdered under Japanese control. The Dalton Pass was the scene of a major battle between the Empire of Japan, the Commonwealth of the Philippines and American forces, with the Allies winning on May 31, 1945.

=== Postwar Era ===
In 1971, with the passage of Republic Act No. 6394, Quirino, which was then a sub-province of Nueva Vizcaya, was separated from its mother province and made into a regular province.

=== Martial law era ===
The beginning months of the 1970s had marked a period of turmoil and change in the Philippines, as well as in Nueva Vizcaya. During his bid to be the first Philippine president to be re-elected for a second term, Ferdinand Marcos launched an unprecedented number of foreign debt-funded public works projects. This caused the Philippine economy to take a sudden downwards turn known as the 1969 Philippine balance of payments crisis, which led to a period of economic difficulty and social unrest throughout the country. Marcos responded by lumping all his critics together as "communists" regardless of their actual views and suspending the privilege of the writ of habeas corpus through Proclamation No. 889 in August 1971. But this only had the effect of pushing moderate protesters towards the radical left. Marcos' actions thus allowed the Marxist–Leninist–Maoist New People's Army to build a presence in Cagayan Valley, including Nueva Vizcaya. This would end only five and a half decades later in 2024, when the government declared Nueva Vizcaya an "insurgency-free" province.

In the northern part of Nueva Vizcaya, another significant event was the Ikalahan people's 1972 court victory in an effort to recover their ancestral lands from development aggression. In 1970, Ikalahan learned that the government planning to grab about 6,300 hectares of their ancestral lands, which would then be converted into a vacation center which would be called "Marcos City." The plan hinged on the use of fake titles by certain relatives of high government officials. After gathering the affected communities, the Ikalahan filed a case asking for the courts to recognize their ancestral land claims. With help from attorney Julian de Vera who was a retired attorney from the Commission on National Integration (now the National Commission on Indigenous Peoples), the Ikalahan fought an effort by the Marcos administration to have the case dismissed, and the court revoked the fake landtitles of the lowlanders in 1972, forcing the administration to abandon their plans.

Later that year, however, Marcos himself unleashed extreme social and political changes which would impact both the whole province and the whole nation. With only a year left in his last constitutionally allowed term as president, Ferdinand Marcos placed the Philippines under Martial Law in September 1972 and thus retained the position for fourteen more years. This period in Philippine history is remembered for the Marcos administration's record of human rights abuses, particularly targeting political opponents, student activists, journalists, religious workers, farmers, and others who fought against the Marcos dictatorship.

== Geography ==
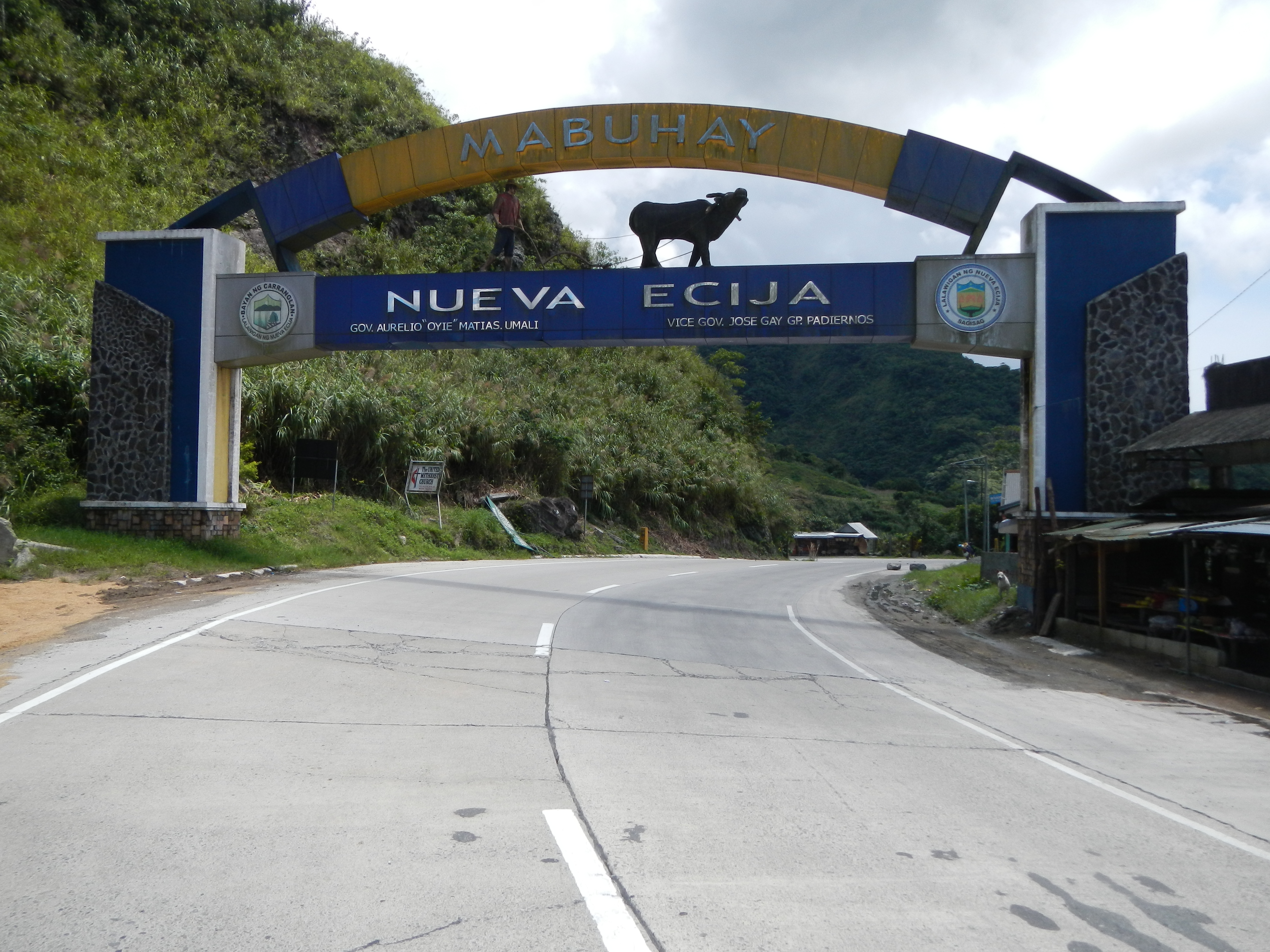
Gateway Arch near Dalton Pass

Surrounded by North Luzon's three large mountain ranges, Nueva Vizcaya is generally mountainous, varying from steep mountains to rolling hills, with some valleys and plains. It is bordered on the west by the Cordillera mountains, on the east by the Sierra Madre mountains, and on the south by the Caraballo Mountains. The province (and the entire Cagayan Valley) are separated from the Central Luzon plains by the Caraballo Mountains.

The province has a total land area of 3,975.67 square kilometres (1,535.01 sq mi). The southernmost province in the Cagayan Valley region, Nueva Vizcaya lies approximately 268 kilometres (167 mi) north of Metro Manila and can be reached by land via the Cagayan Valley Road (Maharlika Highway).

=== Administrative divisions ===
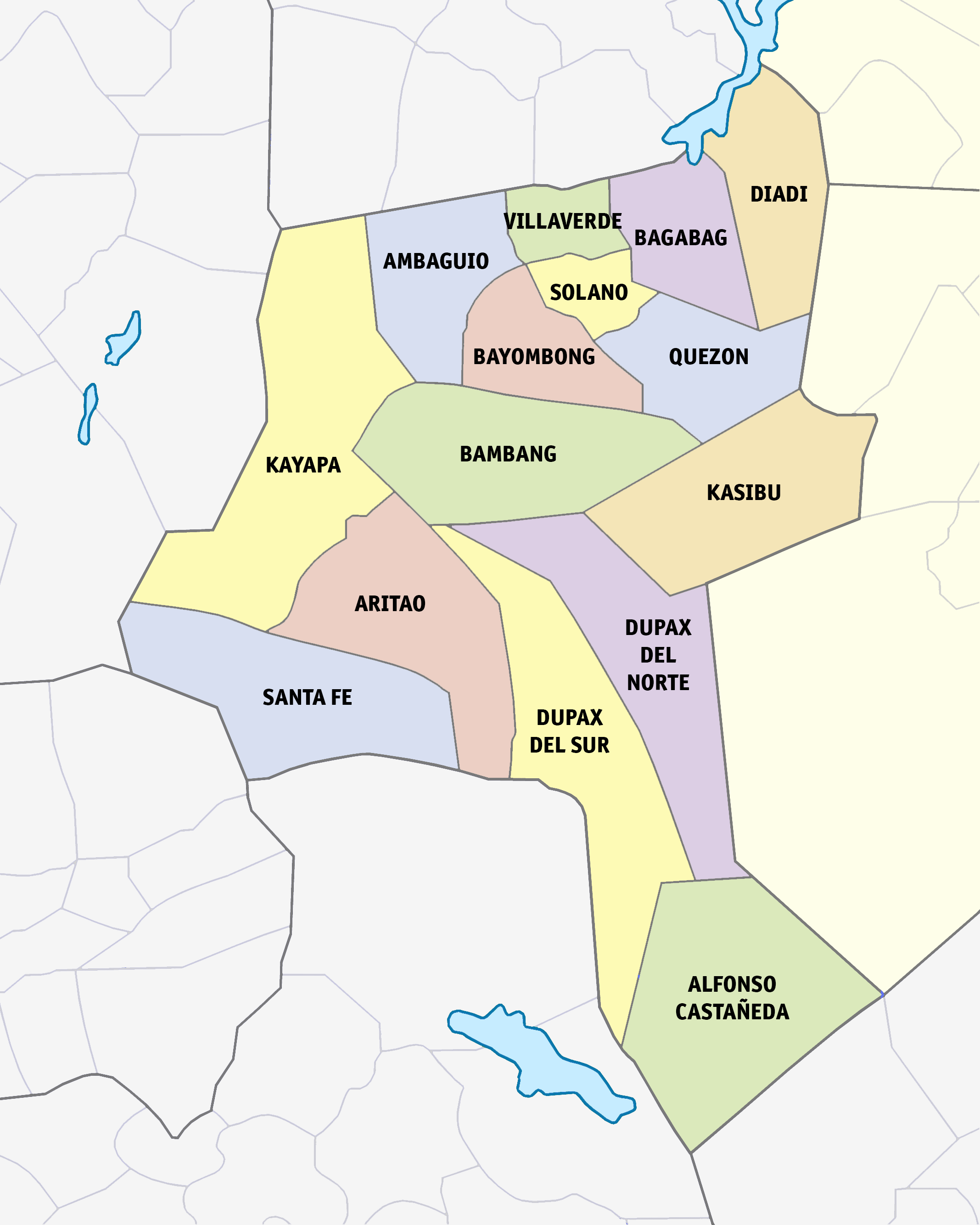
Political map of Nueva Vizcaya

Nueva Vizcaya comprises 15 municipalities, with Bayombong as the provincial capital and major educational center, Bambang (the agricultural hub) and Solano (the financial district) as the major commercial centers, and Kayapa as the summer capital and "vegetable bowl" of the province. All municipalities are encompassed by a lone legislative district, but are separated into two districts for purposes of representation in its provincial board. The 1st District comprises the municipalities of Ambaguio, Bagabag, Bayombong, Diadi, Quezon, Solano and Villaverde, while the 2nd District is composed of the municipalities of Alfonso Castañeda, Aritao, Bambang, Dupax del Norte, Dupax del Sur, Kayapa, Kasibu and Santa Fe.

Geographically, the western half of Nueva Vizcaya is part of the main Cordilleras, while its eastern half is part of the Caraballos, the meeting point of the Cordilleras and the Sierra Madre. There have been grassroot moves to reunify Nueva Vizcaya with the Cordillera Region due to cultural and geographical harmony, however, none have been introduced in Congress.

Municipality (Note: Former names are italicized.) (Note: The globe icon marks the town center.)		Population			±% p.a.	Area		Density (2024)		Barangay
		(2024)		(2020)		km^{2}	sq mi	/km^{2}	/sq mi	
Alfonso Castañeda		1.7%	8,933	8,539	+0.86%	849.83	328.12	11	28	6
Ambaguio		3.1%	16,401	15,472	+1.38%	156.26	60.33	100	260	8
Aritao		8.5%	45,000	42,197	+1.52%	265.60	102.55	170	440	22
Bagabag		7.4%	39,138	37,985	+0.71%	183.90	71.00	210	540	17
Bambang		11.3%	60,146	55,789	+1.78%	345.00	133.21	170	440	25
Bayombong	†	13.8%	72,890	67,714	+1.75%	163.36	63.07	450	1,200	25
Diadi		3.9%	20,438	19,236	+1.44%	181.20	69.96	110	280	19
Dupax del Norte		6.7%	35,509	33,295	+1.53%	347.30	134.09	100	260	15
Dupax del Sur		4.5%	22,388	21,224	+1.26%	374.70	144.67	60	160	19
Kasibu		8.8%	46,845	41,776	+2.73%	318.80	123.09	150	390	30
Kayapa		5.3%	27,865	26,469	+1.22%	740.20	285.79	38	98	30
Quezon		4.8%	25,306	24,055	+1.20%	266.62	102.94	95	250	12
Santa Fe (Imugan)		3.6%	18,950	18,276	+0.86%	399.81	154.37	47	120	16
Solano		13.1%	69,296	65,287	+1.41%	139.80	53.98	500	1,300	22
Villaverde (Ibung)		4.0%	21,001	20,118	+1.02%	81.50	31.47	260	670	9
Total			530,106	497,432	+1.51%	4,813.88	1,858.65	110	260	275
	† Provincial capital					Municipality				

=== Barangays ===
The 15 municipalities of the province comprise a total of 275 barangays, with Roxas in Solano, Nueva Vizcaya as the most populous in 2010, and Santa Rosa in Santa Fe, Nueva Vizcaya as the least.

== Demographics ==
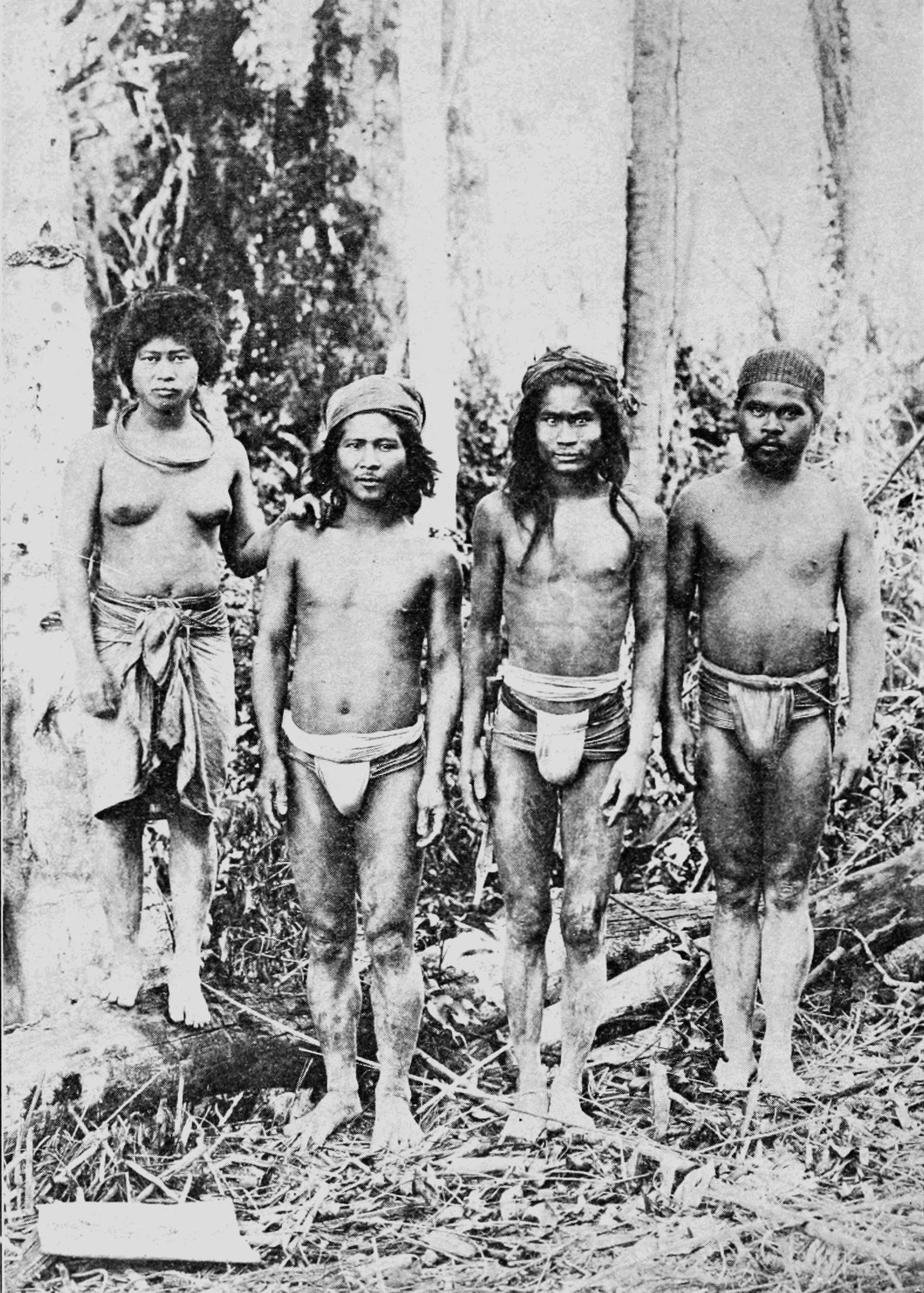
Ilongot tribe from Oyao in Nueva Vizcaya

Population census of Nueva Vizcaya
Year	Pop.	±% p.a.
1903	62,541	—
1918	35,838	−3.64%
1939	74,582	+3.55%
1948	80,198	+0.81%
1960	113,824	+2.96%
1970	172,198	+4.22%
1975	213,151	+4.37%
1980	241,690	+2.54%
1990	301,179	+2.23%
1995	334,965	+2.01%
2000	366,962	+1.98%
2007	397,837	+1.12%
2010	421,355	+2.11%
2015	452,287	+1.36%
2020	497,432	+2.02%
2024	530,106	+1.54%
Source: Philippine Statistics Authority

The population of Nueva Vizcaya in the 2024 census was 530,106 people, with a density of 130 inhabitants per square kilometre or 340 inhabitants per square mile.

Nueva Vizcaya is home to about 18 indigenous peoples, which includes the major tribes of the Ifugao (Quezon, Bagabag, Kasibu), Gaddang (Solano and Bayombong), Isinai (Dupax del Sur and Bambang), Dumagat (Aritao), Kalanguya (Santa Fe), and the Bugkalot (Alfonso Castañeda and Dupax del Norte). Indigenous peoples' groups have filed for ancestral domain titles covering parts of the province.

The Ilokano population in the province are not indigenous as they were part of the labor force initially needed by the Spanish administration to work on the tobacco plantations beginning in the 1700s, and later immigrants with skills construct churches and other structures needed for development. Indigenous tribes were not cooperative with the Spaniards. After several insurrections by the locals, Spanish officials chose to import trained labor from established settlements in the coastal regions of Pangasinan and Ilocos. So, it was deliberated in the Spanish Congress the need for in migration of labor. After it was voted by a majority and approved by the king, Ilocanos started to migrate and were given homestead. Thus, the start of the migration of Ilocanos in the province.

Every last week of May, these ethnolinguistic groups gather to celebrate the Ammungan festival (formerly Panagyaman festival), a week-long affair culminating on May 24, the province's foundation day.

Since Nueva Vizcaya's birth as a province, traces of the culture and customs of its early settlers—the Ilongots (Bugkalot), Igorots [ Ifugaos, Isinais, Kalanguya], Gaddangs, and the Pangasinans—can still be seen. The influx of civilization and the infusion of modern technology to the life stream of the province induced immigration from adjacent provinces. The province was pushed to be included in the Cordillera Autonomous Region because the province is technically within the Cordillera, however, it did not came to be due to the failure to enact an autonomous Cordillera by the national government. Today, questions linger on the exclusion of Nueva Vizcaya despite the province being culturally and geographically linked to the Cordilleras. The province also has the largest Igorot population outside the Cordillera region. Tagalogs live along the border of Nueva Ecija and in the capital, Bayombong.

=== Languages ===
Nueva Vizcaya province possesses one of the most diverse array of indigenous languages in Luzon, a testimony to its cultural and geographic linkages with the Cordillera mountain range. The indigenous languages of the province listed by the Komisyon ng Wikang Filipino are the Bugkalut language, Ibaloy language, Ifugaw language, Iguwak language, Irungdungan language, Isinay language, Kalanguya language, and Kankanaey language. During the later part of the Spanish regime, people from Ilocos region migrated to the province through the recommendation of Spanish officials in the province. It was deliberated in the Spanish court in Spain and with a majority vote and approval of the king of Spain, Ilocanos were allowed to migrate to the province. Thus, the importation of the Ilocano language and culture started, becoming the lingua franca of the province. Ilocano accents were affected by the native languages of the peoples whom Ilocanos intermingled with. Remarkably, the economy of the province started to grow because of the industry of the Ilocanos as well as through their innate talent in entrepreneurship and in other industries including agriculture. As Nueva Vizcaya was part of Provincia de Cagayan which is the predecessor of Cagayan Valley, a few residents speak Ibanag, which was the lingua franca of Provincia de Cagayan before it was replaced by Ilocano.

=== Religion ===
Roman Catholics are about 63% of the population of the province. Other faiths are divided among Aglipayan Church, Iglesia ni Cristo which form about 5–6% of the province population, The Church of Jesus Christ of Latter-day Saints, Jehovah's Witnesses, Baptist, Methodist, Pentecostals, Seventh-day Adventist and other Evangelical Christians which forms about 17%–20% of the province's population as well as Muslims and indigenous Cordilleran religions.

== Economy ==
Poverty incidence of Nueva Vizcaya (%)

Source: Philippine Statistics Authority

Agriculture is the main industry in the province, together with rice, corn, fruits and vegetables as major crops. Nueva Vizcaya is a major producer of citrus crops in the country, principally pomelo, ponkan and oranges. The Nueva Vizcaya Agricultural Terminal in Bambang supplies the demand of neighboring provinces and Metro Manila. The province became the leading producer of ginger in the Philippines in 2024 with an output of 7,140 metric tons, leading the Department of Agriculture to designate it as the country's ginger capital.

There is a mining industry in the province such as the Didipio mine in the municipality of Kasibu, which added to the provincial income. However, mining activities have also been alleged to have dried up water sources, polluted the environment, and endangered livelihoods of farmers and fisherfolk. According to the Mines and Geosciences Bureau, deposits of metallic minerals discovered in the province are copper, gold, molybdenum and pyrite. Non-metallic deposits include red clay, white clay and limestone, with sand and gravel being the most abundant deposits in the province.

== Government ==
Official rendering of the seal used by Provincial Government

Nueva Vizcaya has one congressional district, although there has been a longtime proposal to divide the province into two congressional districts.

Members of the Nueva Vizcaya Provincial Council (2022 – 2025)
Position	Provincial Official
Provincial Governor	Atty. Jose V. Gambito
Provincial Vice Governor	Eufemia A. Dacayo
District Representative (Lone District of Nueva Vizcaya)	Rep. Timothy Joseph Cayton
Provincial Board Members	Patricio Dumlao Jr.
Provincial Board Members	Byron Sevillena
Provincial Board Members	Delbert Tidang
Provincial Board Members	Eunice Gambol
Provincial Board Members	Atty. Primo Percival Marcos
Provincial Board Members	Roland Carub
Provincial Board Members	Pablo Kindot
Provincial Board Members	Atty. Edgardo C. Balgos
Provincial Board Members	Florante S. Gerdan
Provincial Board Members	Elma Pinao-an Lejao
Provincial Board Members	Eufemia Dacayo
Provincial Board Members	Victor Gines Jr.
Provincial Board Members	Marizel Reyes
Provincial Board Members	Samuel Balinhawang

== Culture ==
Every May, the province holds the Ammungan Festival, a five-day festival in celebration for its founding anniversary. The word "Ammungan" is a Gaddang word meaning "gathering" symbolizing the unity of the different ethnolinguistic groups in the province. The festival showcase different shows including cultural showcase, beauty pageant, agri-trade fair, tourism expo, dance competitions and a concerts.

== Education ==
Nueva Vizcaya has the following education institutions, among others.

- Saint Catherine's School (Bambang)
- Saint Jerome's Academy
- Nueva Vizcaya State University, with campuses in Bayombong and Bambang.
- Saint Mary's University (Bayombong)
- Muir Woods Academy, Inc. (Bayombong)
- Philippine Science High School – Cagayan Valley Campus (Bayombong)
- Aldersgate College (Solano)
- Sierra College (Bayombong)
- PLT College, Inc. (Bayombong)
- JARS Academy (Bayombong)
- Our Lady of Peace and Good Voyage Institue of Technology Inc (‘’Bayombong’’)
- King's Colleges of the Philippines (Bambang)
- Saint Mary's School of Dupax
- Saint Teresitas's Academy of Aritao
- Dupax del Norte National High School
- Dupax del Sur National High School
- Ganao National High School
- Saint Catherine of Siena
- Saint Louis College of Solano, Inc. (Solano)
- Solano High School (Solano)
- Nueva Vizcaya General Comprehensive High School (Bayombong)
- Exalta Polytechnic Institute (Formerly Northern Luzon Technical Institute) (Bayombong)
- Nueva Vizcaya Caregiver Academy (Solano)
- Nueva Vizcaya Institute (Aritao)
- Solano Institute of Technology (Solano)
- Vizcaya Institute of Computer Science (Bayombong)
- Aurora Christian School (Bambang)

== Notable personalities ==
- Carlos Padilla - (Dupax del Norte) - Governor and Congressman of Nueva Vizcaya. (2016–2022 and 1987–1992, 1995–2004, 2007–2016)
- Edith Tiempo – (Bayombong) – National Artist for Literature
- John Castriciones – (Bayombong) – Secretary of Agrarian Reform (2017–2021)
- Danilo Lim – (Solano) – Army officer, coup-plotter and Chairman of the Metropolitan Manila Development Authority (2017–2021)
- Vicente Danao – (Bayombong) – Chief of the Philippine National Police (2022)
- Leonardo B. Perez – (Bayombong) – Senator (1967–1972) and Chairman of the Commission on Elections (1973–1980)
- Romeo A. Brawner – (Solano) – Chairman of the Commission on Elections (2008)
- Roy V. Aragon – (Dupax del Norte) – Author
- Jimboy Martin – (Solano) – Actor/Rapper – PBB 737 winner
- Hillarie Parungao – (Solano) – Philippine representative and Top 10 semifinalist at the Miss World 2015 pageant
- Marites Vitug – (Solano) – investigative journalist
- Xyza Cruz Bacani – (Bambang) – International street photographer first recognized by New York Times magazine in 2015.
- Stacey Sevilleja – (Bagabag) – member of the Pinoy pop group Bini
