= Villaverde, Nueva Vizcaya =

Municipality in Nueva Vizcaya, Philippines

Villaverde Ibung
- Municipality
- Municipality of Villaverde
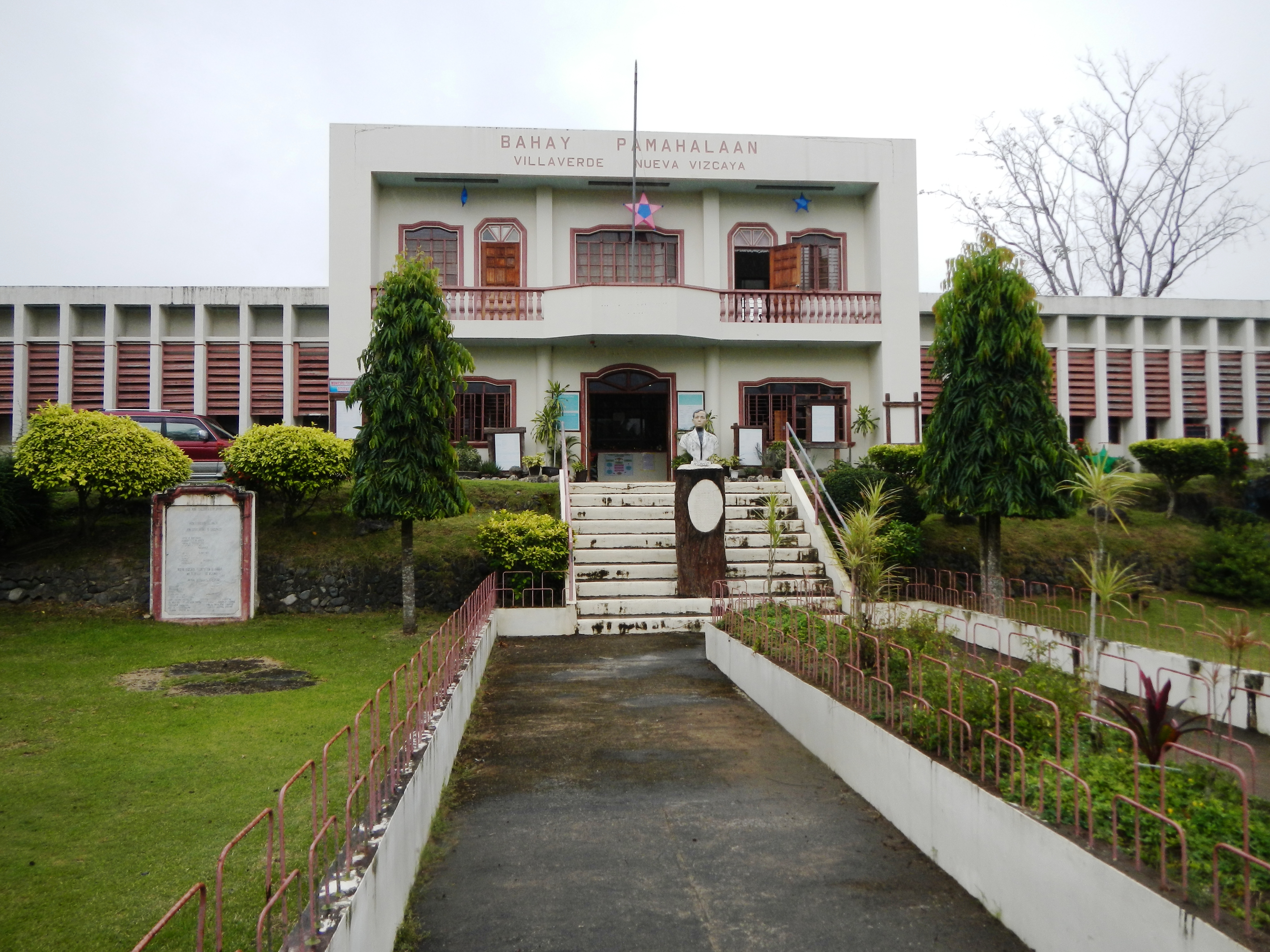
- Municipal Hall

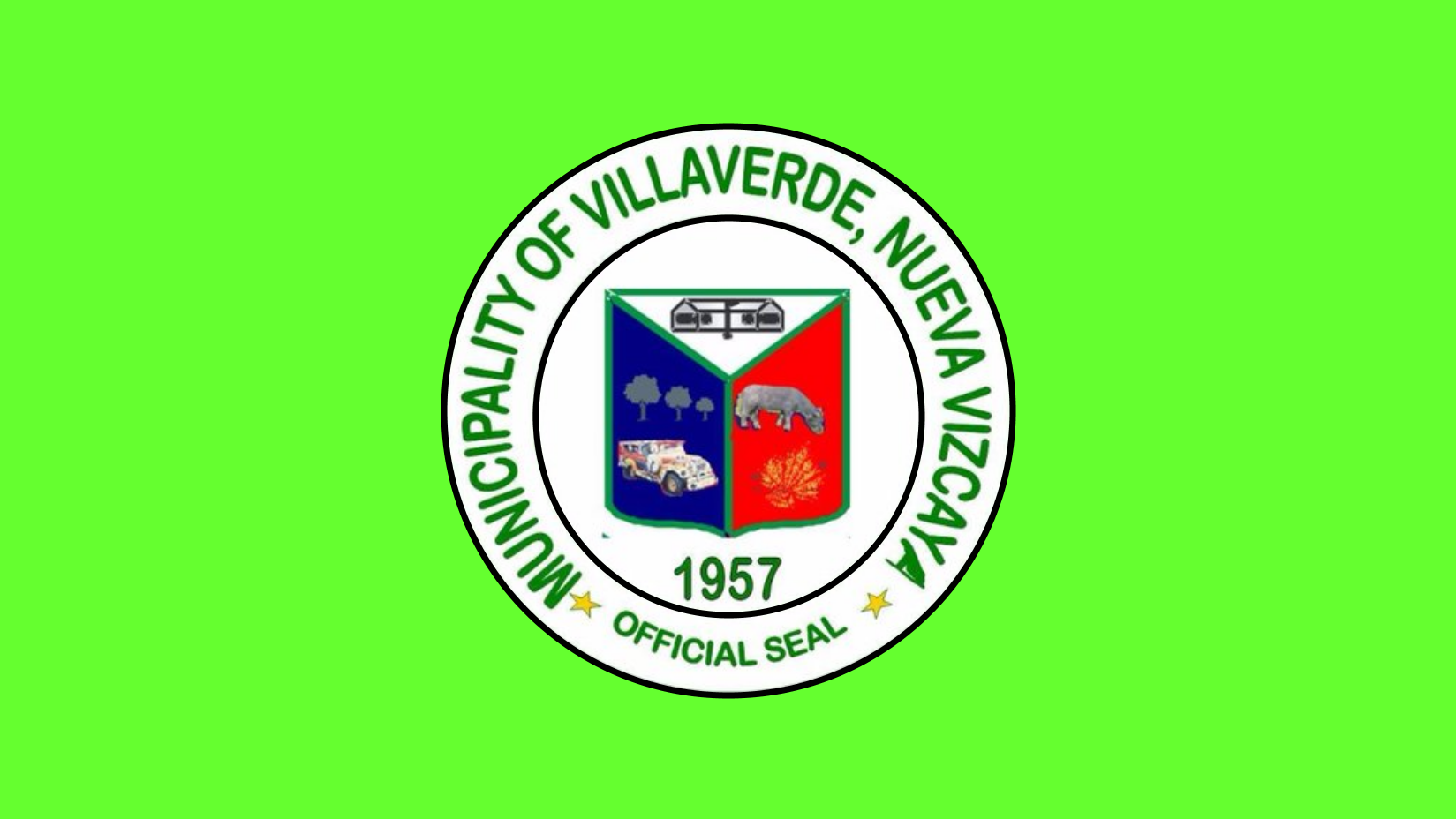
- Flag Seal

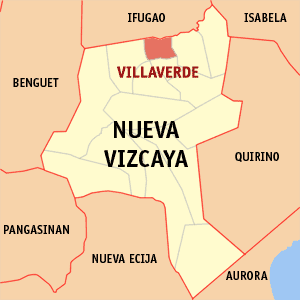
- Map of Nueva Vizcaya with Villaverde highlighted
- Interactive map of Villaverde
- Location within the Philippines
- Coordinates: 16°36′24″N 121°10′58″E
- Country: Philippines
- Region: Cagayan Valley
- Province: Nueva Vizcaya
- District: Lone district
- Named for: Padre Juan Villaverde
- Barangays: 9 (see Barangays)

Government
  - Type: Sangguniang Bayan
  - Mayor: Ronelie U. Valtoribio
  - Vice Mayor: Kajong Eng. Acosta
  - Representative: Timothy Joseph Cayton (Aksyon)
  - Electorate: 11,991 voters (2025)

Area
  - Total: 81.50 km^{2} (31.47 sq mi)
- Elevation: 287 m (942 ft)
- Highest elevation: 787 m (2,582 ft)
- Lowest elevation: 213 m (699 ft)

Population (2024 census)
  - Total: 21,001
  - Density: 257.7/km^{2} (667.4/sq mi)
  - Households: 5,688

Economy
  - Income class: 4th municipal income class
  - Poverty incidence: 6.36% (2023)
  - Revenue: ₱ 362.3 million (2024)
  - Assets: ₱ 973.3 million (2024)
  - Expenditure: ₱ 228.8 million (2024)
  - Liabilities: ₱ 126.8 million (2024)

Service provider
  - Electricity: Nueva Vizcaya Electric Cooperative (NUVELCO)
- Time zone: UTC+8 (PST)
- ZIP code: 3710
- PSGC: 0205014000
- IDD : area code: +63 (0)78
- Native languages: Ilocano; Tagalog
- Website: www.lguvillaverde.com

Villaverde, officially the Municipality of Villaverde (Ilocano: Ili ti Villaverde; Tagalog: Bayan ng Villaverde), also spelled as Villa Verde, is a municipality in the province of Nueva Vizcaya, Philippines. The town was named in honor of the Spanish Missionary, Father Juan Villaverde. According to the 2024 census, it has a population of 21,001 people.

== History ==
=== Spanish era ===
Villaverde was formerly a barrio of Solano, Nueva Vizcaya called Ibung, founded by a Dominican Friar named Alejandro Vidal in 1767. More than a century later, an order from the Spanish Government was issued to Father Juan Villaverde giving instruction to organize into a town. Thus, on May 28, 1872, Ibung became a town of the province of Nueva Vizcaya. Ibung was originally settled by christianized Ifugaos resettled from the area of Kiangan who later abandoned the town after a malaria epidemic in 1890, whereupon they were replaced by Ilocano migrants.

=== American era ===
When the American took over, Ibung lost its status as a town because of insufficient funds. Moreover, most of the people residing in the area have transferred to an adjoining towns for fear of their lives from non-Christian tribes who dwelt in Cordillera mountains in the north-west part of the town. Ibung became a barangay of the municipality of Solano again .

=== Philippine independence ===
On June 17, 1957, through the sponsorship of the Congressman Leonardo B. Perez, Republic Act. No. 197 was enacted providing for the creation of the town Ibung through the separation of the barrios of Ibung and Bintawan from Solano. On September 1, 1957, Antonio B. Aquino was appointed as the first mayor of Ibung.

Two years later, on June 21, 1959, Republic Act. No. 2515 was enacted amending Republic Act. No. 1972 changing the name of the town from Ibung to Villaverde in honor of Father Juan Villaverde who had organized the town. Romualdo Ubando was appointed as the first Municipal Mayor at that time. In 1963, Antonio B. Aquino was the first elected Mayor after renaming the town.

On January 3, 1986, the town's 16-year mayor, Romualdo Bediones, was abducted by New People's Army (NPA) rebels led by a "Ka Annie" and held until he was tried by a kangaroo court and executed in public on January 11 after being declared guilty of "landgrabbing" and protecting criminality; his abducted driver was released by the rebels to inform authorities about the execution.

== Geography ==
The Municipality of Villaverde lies on the northern district of the province and is bounded by Lamut, Ifugao on the North; Solano on the South; Bagabag on the East, and Ambaguio on the West. It has a total land area of 81.50 square kilometers, the smallest town which accounts for 1.86% of the total land area of Nueva Vizcaya.

Villaverde is situated 15.89 kilometres (9.87 mi) from the provincial capital Bayombong, and 308.30 kilometres (191.57 mi) from the country's capital city of Manila.

=== Barangays ===
Villaverde is politically subdivided into 9 barangays. Each barangay consists of puroks and some have sitios.

Barangay Poblacion where the Municipal Hall is located and Barangays Ibung, Bintawan Norte and Bintawan Sur as the commercial and educational center of the town.

- Bintawan Norte
- Bintawan Sur
- Cabuluan
- Ibung
- Nagbitin
- Ocapon
- Pieza
- Poblacion (Turod)
- Sawmill

=== Climate ===
Climate data for Villaverde, Nueva Vizcaya
Month	Jan	Feb	Mar	Apr	May	Jun	Jul	Aug	Sep	Oct	Nov	Dec	Year
Mean daily maximum °C (°F)	24 (75)	26 (79)	28 (82)	31 (88)	31 (88)	30 (86)	30 (86)	29 (84)	29 (84)	28 (82)	26 (79)	24 (75)	28 (82)
Mean daily minimum °C (°F)	19 (66)	19 (66)	20 (68)	22 (72)	23 (73)	23 (73)	23 (73)	23 (73)	23 (73)	22 (72)	21 (70)	20 (68)	22 (71)
Average precipitation mm (inches)	119 (4.7)	83 (3.3)	54 (2.1)	37 (1.5)	133 (5.2)	132 (5.2)	161 (6.3)	163 (6.4)	153 (6.0)	142 (5.6)	160 (6.3)	224 (8.8)	1,561 (61.4)
Average rainy days	18.4	13.6	11.6	9.4	19.3	21.9	23.9	23.4	21.1	16.3	18.1	21.4	218.4
Source: Meteoblue

== Demographics ==
Population census of Villaverde

Year	Pop.	±% p.a.
1960	7,120	—
1970	8,709	+2.03%
1975	10,590	+4.00%
1980	10,644	+0.10%
1990	13,594	+2.48%
1995	13,431	−0.23%

Year	Pop.	±% p.a.
2000	15,392	+2.96%
2007	16,623	+1.07%
2010	17,720	+2.35%
2015	18,507	+0.83%
2020	20,118	+1.77%
2024	21,001	+1.04%

Source: Philippine Statistics Authority

In the 2020 census, Villaverde had a population of 20,118. The population density was 250 inhabitants per square kilometre (650/sq mi).

== Economy ==
Poverty incidence of Villaverde (%)

Source: Philippine Statistics Authority

== Government ==
=== Local government ===
Villaverde is part of the lone congressional district of the province of Nueva Vizcaya. It is governed by a mayor, designated as its local chief executive, and by a municipal council as its legislative body in accordance with the Local Government Code. The mayor, vice mayor, and the municipal councilors are elected directly in polls held every three years.

=== Elected officials ===
Members of the Municipal Council (2022-2025)
Position	Name
Congressman	Luisa L. Cuaresma
Mayor	Atty. Ronelie U. Valtoribio
Vice-Mayor	Engr. Marlon John R. Acosta
Councilors	Atty. Kruwel JD. Dacumos
Councilors	Anastacio T. Mariñas, Jr.
Councilors	Braulio R. Ocumen, Jr.
Councilors	Johny P. Tuguinay
Councilors	Christine A. Peralta
Councilors	Jerry V. Jose
Councilors	Danilo E. Duro
Councilors	Rubbyrose U. Barrientos

== Education ==
The Schools Division of Nueva Vizcaya governs the town's public education system. The division office is a field office of the DepEd in Cagayan Valley region. The Villaverde Schools District Office governs all public and private elementary and high schools throughout the municipality.

=== Primary and elementary schools ===
- Bintawan North Elementary School
- Bintawan South Elementary School
- Bintawan UMC Learning Center
- Buenavista Elementary School
- Felix-Juana Brawner Community School
- Gov. Juan Manzano Elementary School
- Nagbitin Elementary School
- Ocapon Elementary School
- Sawmill Elementary School
- Turod Elementary School
- Villa Par-Pale Elementary School
- Villaverde Central School
- Villaverde Central School Annex

=== Secondary schools ===
- Bintawan National High School
- Our Lady of Fatima School of Villaverde

== See also ==
- List of renamed cities and municipalities in the Philippines
