= Quezon, Nueva Vizcaya =

Municipality in Nueva Vizcaya, Philippines

Quezon
- Municipality
- Municipality of Quezon
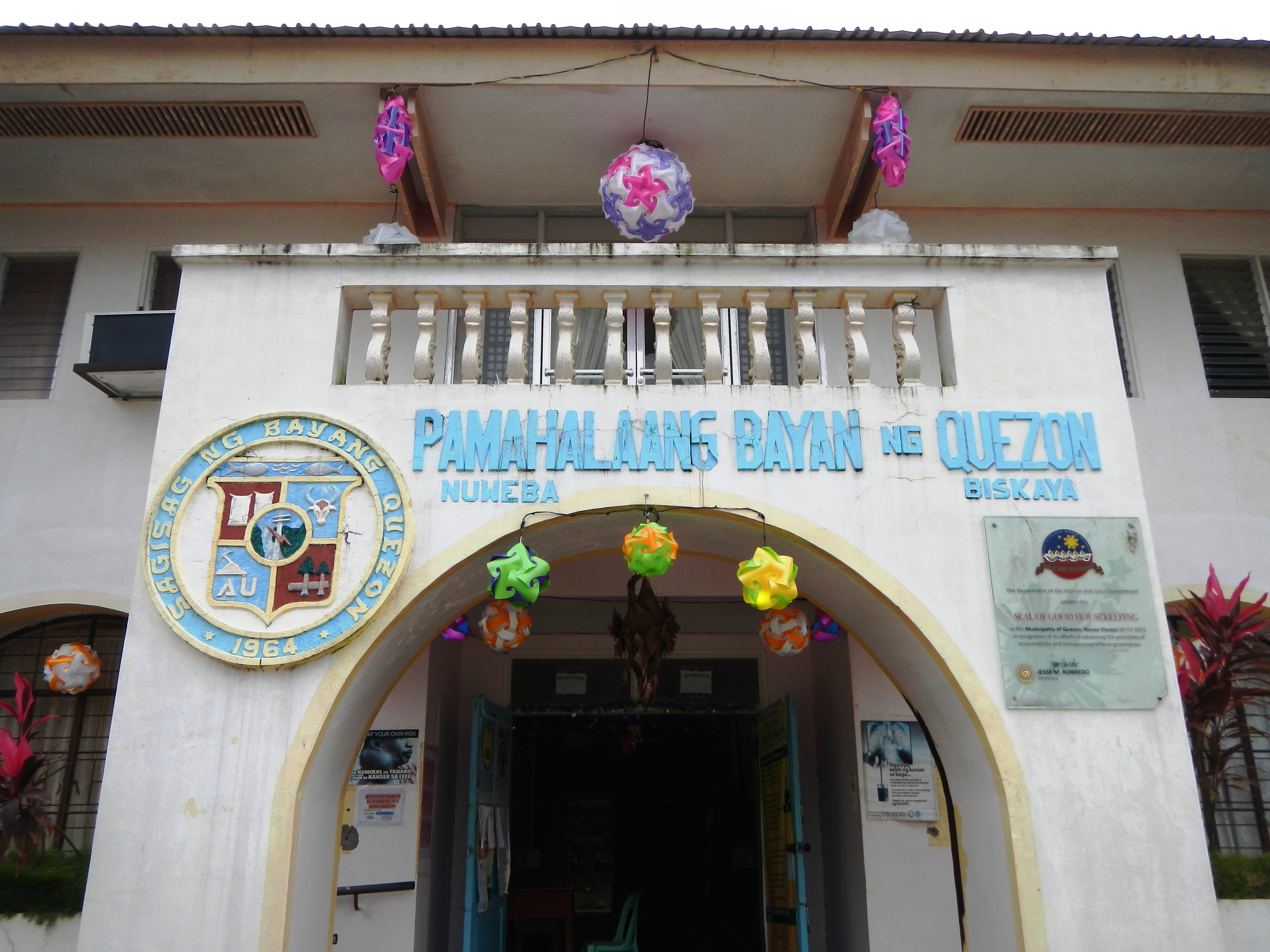
- Municipal hall

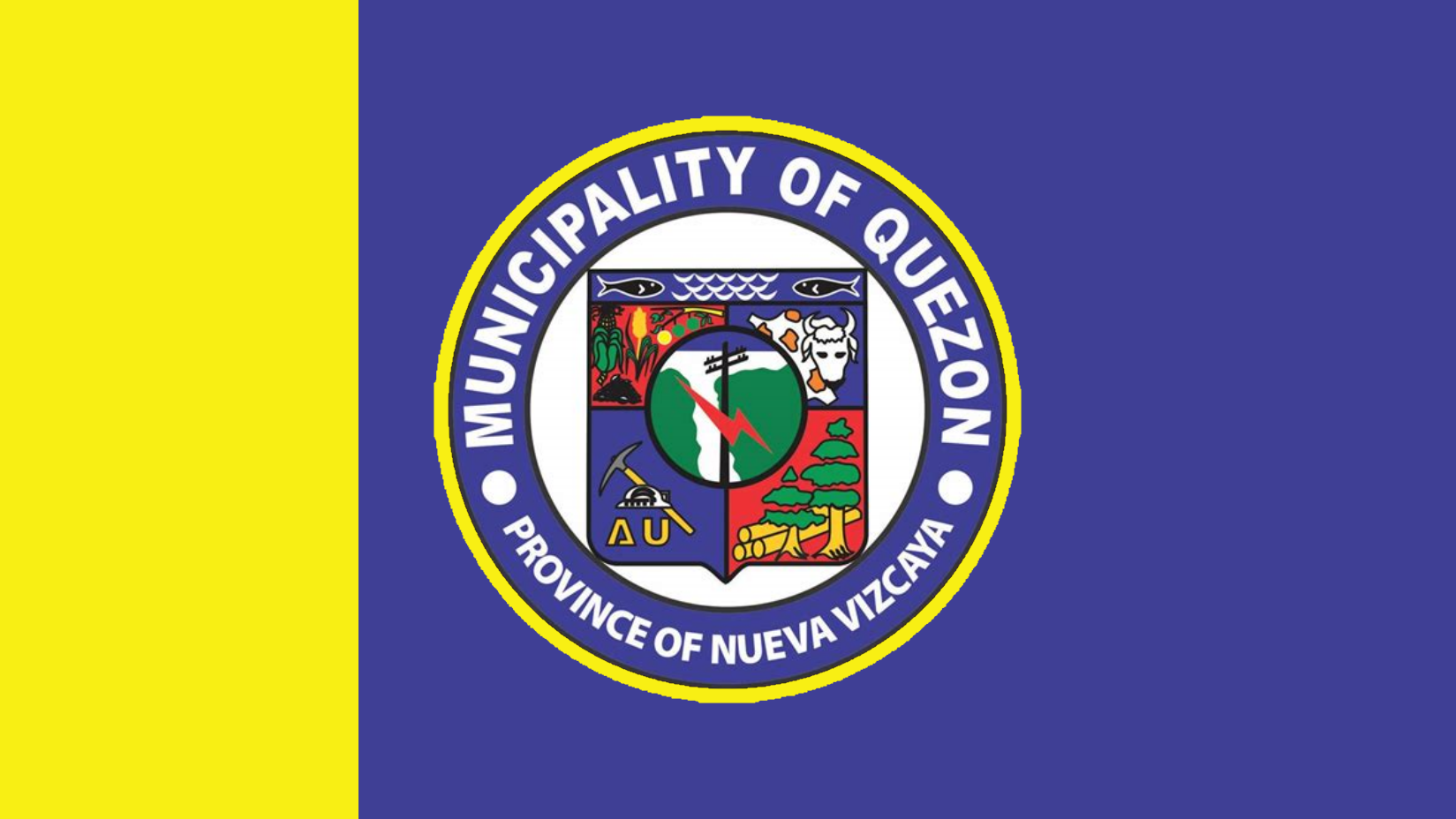
- Flag Seal

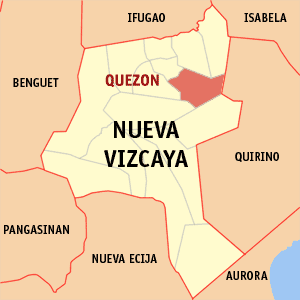
- Map of Nueva Vizcaya with Quezon highlighted
- Interactive map of Quezon
- Location within the Philippines
- Coordinates: 16°29′22″N 121°15′50″E
- Country: Philippines
- Region: Cagayan Valley
- Province: Nueva Vizcaya
- District: Lone district
- Founded: 1964
- Barangays: 12 (see Barangays)

Government
  - Type: Sangguniang Bayan
  - Mayor: Dolores B. Binwag
  - Vice Mayor: Amor Dincog
  - Representative: Timothy Joseph Cayton (Aksyon)
  - Electorate: 15,798 voters (2025)

Area
  - Total: 187.50 km^{2} (72.39 sq mi)
- Elevation: 406 m (1,332 ft)
- Highest elevation: 1,320 m (4,330 ft)
- Lowest elevation: 236 m (774 ft)

Population (2024 census)
  - Total: 25,306
  - Density: 134.97/km^{2} (349.56/sq mi)
  - Households: 6,214

Economy
  - Income class: 1st municipal income class
  - Poverty incidence: 6.73% (2023)
  - Revenue: ₱ 362.3 million (2024)
  - Assets: ₱ 973.3 million (2024)
  - Expenditure: ₱ 228.8 million (2024)
  - Liabilities: ₱ 126.8 million (2024)

Service provider
  - Electricity: Nueva Vizcaya Electric Cooperative (NUVELCO)
- Time zone: UTC+8 (PST)
- ZIP code: 3713
- PSGC: 0205011000
- IDD : area code: +63 (0)78
- Native languages: Ilocano; Gaddang; Bugkalot; Tagalog

Quezon, officially the Municipality of Quezon (Gaddang: Ili na Quezon; Ilocano: Ili ti Quezon; Tagalog: Bayan ng Quezon), is a municipality in the province of Nueva Vizcaya, Philippines. According to the 2024 census, it has a population of 25,306 people.

== History ==
On June 18, 1961, the municipality of Quezon was created from Solano by virtue of Republic Act No. 3427.

Based on the order assigned to the Commission on Elections, referred to as Case No. 405, dated March 7, 1963, the people of Quezon participated in the November 12, 1963 plebiscite and elected its Municipal District Mayor and Municipal District Members.

Five years later, in 1968, Quezon became a full-fledged municipality of Nueva Vizcaya. The original barangays that composed the municipality at that time of its creation were Baresbes, Caliat, Buliwao, Darubba, Maddiangat, and Nalubbanan.

On November 12, 1967, the following barangays Maasin, Calaocan, Bonifacio, Aurora and Runruno were founded. In 1979, barangay Dagupan was founded.

== Geography ==
Quezon is situated 15.34 kilometers (9.53 mi) from the provincial capital Bayombong, and 307.74 kilometers (191.22 mi) from the national capital city of Manila.

=== Barangays ===
Quezon is politically subdivided into 12 barangays. Each barangay consists of puroks and some have sitios.

- Aurora
- Baresbes
- Buliwao
- Bonifacio
- Calaocan
- Caliat
- Dagupan
- Darubba
- Maasin
- Maddiangat
- Nalubbunan
- Runruno

=== Climate ===
Climate data for Quezon, Nueva Vizcaya
Month	Jan	Feb	Mar	Apr	May	Jun	Jul	Aug	Sep	Oct	Nov	Dec	Year
Mean daily maximum °C (°F)	24 (75)	25 (77)	28 (82)	31 (88)	31 (88)	30 (86)	29 (84)	29 (84)	29 (84)	28 (82)	26 (79)	24 (75)	28 (82)
Mean daily minimum °C (°F)	19 (66)	19 (66)	20 (68)	22 (72)	23 (73)	23 (73)	23 (73)	23 (73)	23 (73)	22 (72)	21 (70)	20 (68)	22 (71)
Average precipitation mm (inches)	119 (4.7)	83 (3.3)	54 (2.1)	37 (1.5)	133 (5.2)	132 (5.2)	161 (6.3)	163 (6.4)	153 (6.0)	142 (5.6)	160 (6.3)	224 (8.8)	1,561 (61.4)
Average rainy days	18.4	13.6	11.6	9.4	19.3	21.9	23.9	23.4	21.1	16.3	18.1	21.4	218.4
Source: Meteoblue

== Demographics ==
Population census of Quezon
Year	Pop.	±% p.a.
1970	5,156	—
1975	7,405	+7.53%
1980	9,716	+5.58%
1990	12,206	+2.31%
1995	13,944	+2.53%
2000	15,986	+2.97%
2007	17,487	+1.25%
2010	19,385	+3.82%
2015	21,056	+1.59%
2020	24,055	+2.84%
2024	25,306	+1.22%
Source: Philippine Statistics Authority

In the 2020 census, Quezon had a population of 24,055. The population density was 130 inhabitants per square kilometer or 340 inhabitants per square mile.

== Economy ==
Poverty incidence of Quezon (%)

Source: Philippine Statistics Authority

== Government ==
=== Local government ===
Quezon is part of the lone congressional district of the province of Nueva Vizcaya. It is governed by a mayor, designated as its local chief executive, and by a municipal council as its legislative body in accordance with the Local Government Code. The mayor, vice mayor, and the municipal councilors are elected directly in polls held every three years.

=== Elected officials ===
Members of the Municipal Council (2026)
Position	Name
Congressman	Atty. Timothy Joseph E. Cayton
Mayor	Anabelle Mae B. Binwag
Vice-Mayor	Eduardo S. Dasalla
Councilors	Dolores B. Binwag
Councilors	Romualyn M. Madalipay
Councilors	Dodoy C. Rafael
Councilors	Reynante C. Jose
Councilors	Jimmy D. Rafael Sr.
Councilors	Irwin G. Paulino
Councilors	Eduardo S. Dasalla
Councilors	Evelyn P. Arreola

== Education ==
The Schools Division of Nueva Vizcaya governs the town's public education system. The division office is a field office of the DepEd in Cagayan Valley region. The Quezon Schools District Office governs all public and private elementary and high schools throughout the municipality.

=== Primary and elementary schools ===
- Atan Elementary School
- Aurora Elementary School
- Baresbes Elementary School
- Bonifacio Elementary School
- Buliwao Elementary School
- Busat Elementary School
- Cabinnuangan Elementary School
- Christian Glory Baptist Academy of Quezon
- Dagupan Elementary School
- Darubba Elementary School
- Dumaliguia Elementary School
- Laya Elementary School
- Maasin Elementary School
- Maddiangat Elementary School
- Nalubbunan Elementary School
- Nueva Vizcaya Ethel Christian Academy
- Quezon Central School
- Runruno Elementary School
- San Juan Elementary School
- Tutong Elementary School

=== Secondary schools ===
- Quezon National High School
- Runruno National High School
