= Diadi =

Municipality in Nueva Vizcaya, Philippines

- Municipality
- Municipality of Diadi
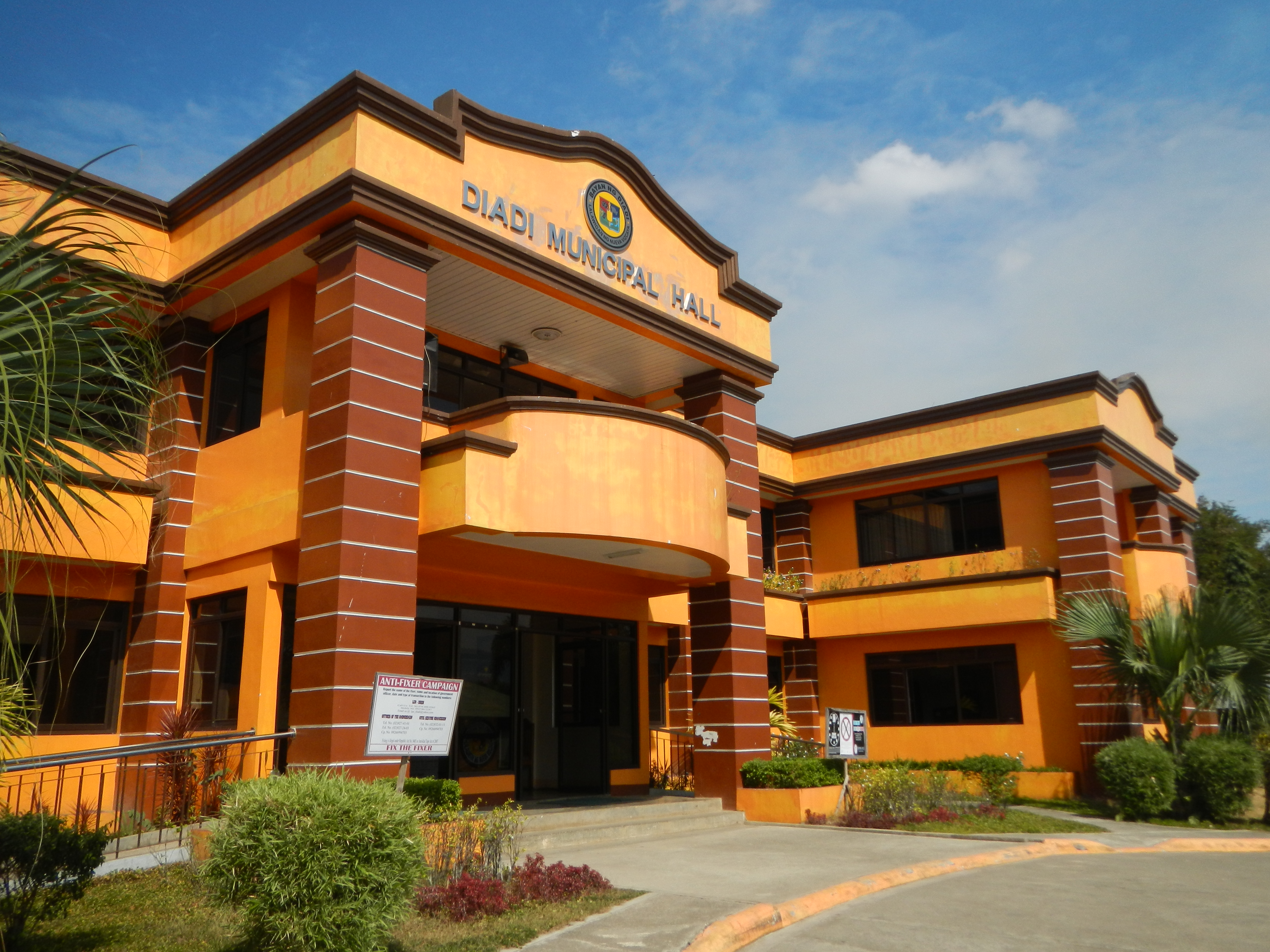
- Municipal hall

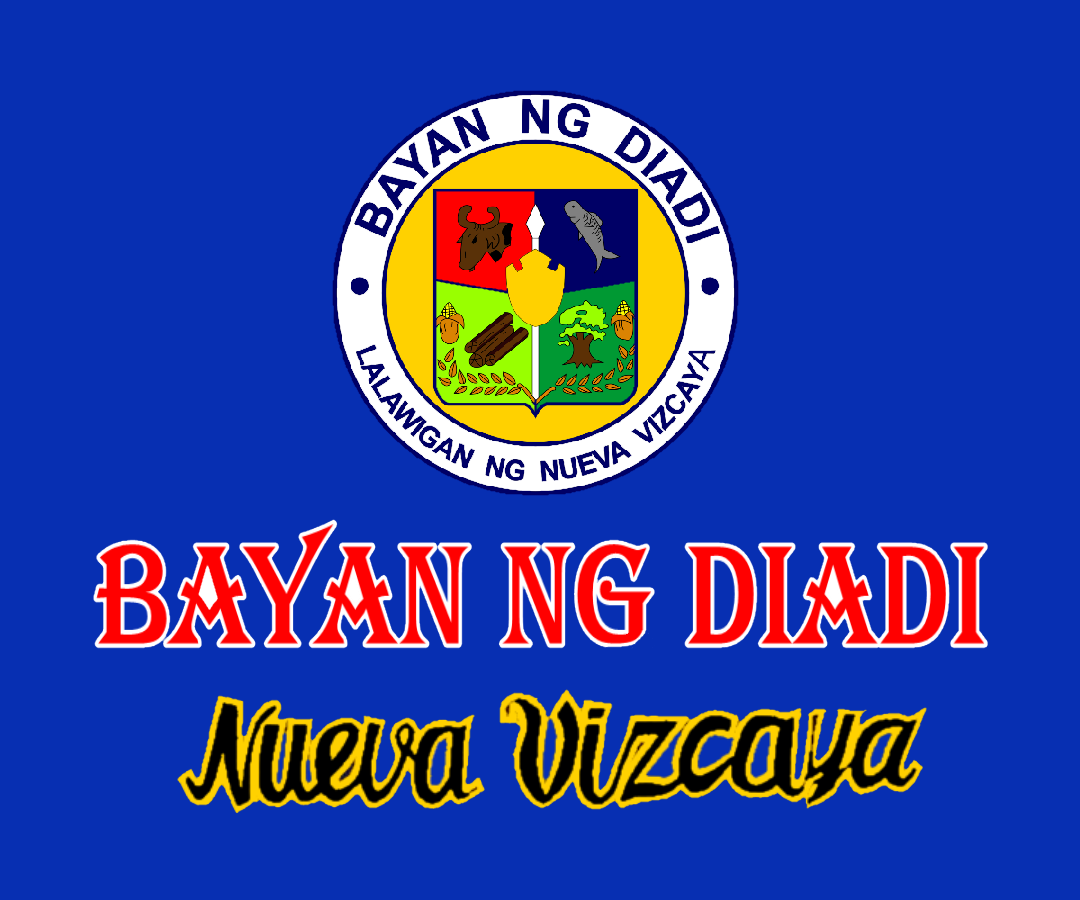
- Flag Seal

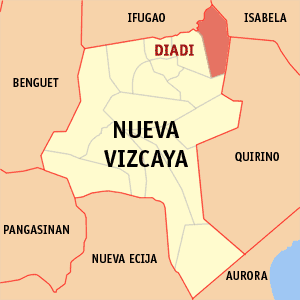
- Map of Nueva Vizcaya with Diadi highlighted
- Interactive map of Diadi
- Location within the Philippines
- Coordinates: 16°39′36″N 121°22′07″E
- Country: Philippines
- Region: Cagayan Valley
- Province: Nueva Vizcaya
- District: Lone district
- Founded: June 17, 1967
- Barangays: 19 (see Barangays)

Government
  - Type: Sangguniang Bayan
  - Mayor: Sandy M. Gayaton
  - Vice Mayor: Rolito Dulnuan
  - Representative: Timothy Joseph Cayton (Aksyon)
  - Electorate: 12,121 voters (2025)

Area
  - Total: 181.20 km^{2} (69.96 sq mi)
- Elevation: 320 m (1,050 ft)
- Highest elevation: 803 m (2,635 ft)
- Lowest elevation: 169 m (554 ft)

Population (2024 census)
  - Total: 20,438
  - Density: 112.79/km^{2} (292.13/sq mi)
  - Households: 4,911

Economy
  - Income class: 3rd municipal income class
  - Poverty incidence: 8.48% (2023)
  - Revenue: ₱ 147.8 million (2024)
  - Assets: ₱ 216 million (2024)
  - Expenditure: ₱ 121 million (2024)
  - Liabilities: ₱ 49.57 million (2024)

Service provider
  - Electricity: Nueva Vizcaya Electric Cooperative (NUVELCO)
- Time zone: UTC+8 (PST)
- ZIP code: 3712
- PSGC: 0205006000
- IDD : area code: +63 (0)78
- Native languages: Gaddang; Ilocano; Bugkalot; Tagalog
- Website: www.diadi-nvizcaya.gov.ph

Diadi, officially the Municipality of Diadi (Gaddang: Ili na Diadi; Ilocano: Ili ti Diadi; Tagalog: Bayan ng Diadi), is a municipality in the province of Nueva Vizcaya, Philippines. According to the 2024 census, it has a population of 20,438 people.

== History ==
Diadi was formerly a barangay of Bagabag named Picat. It was originally founded by the Spaniards in the 18th century at the summit of Mount Namamparang, before being moved down to its foot. The settlement served as a garrison and rest stop along the mountain road between Isabela and Nueva Vizcaya, which was frequently plagued by pagan headhunters, and a resettlement site for christianized Ifugaos and Ilongots.

House Bill No. 182, titled "An Act Creating the Municipal District of Diadi in the Province of Nueva Vizcaya," was introduced by Congressman Leonardo B. Perez on February 28, 1966. It was subsequently approved by the Committee on Provincial and Municipal Governments in Committee Report No. 54. Later, in May 1967, Senator John Osmeña issued Committee Report 1053 recommending passage of the Bill. On 17 June 1967, Republic Act No. 4973 was approved by both chambers of Congress, thus creating the Municipality of Diadi.

== Geography ==
Diadi is situated 40.11 kilometres (24.92 mi) northeast of the provincial capital Bayombong, and 337.52 kilometres (209.73 mi) north of the country's capital city of Manila.

=== Barangays ===
Diadi is politically subdivided into 19 barangays. Each barangay consists of puroks and some have sitios.

- Ampakleng
- Arwas
- Balete
- Bugnay
- Butao
- Decabacan
- Duruarog
- Escoting
- Langka
- Lurad
- Nagsabaran
- Namamparan
- Pinya
- Poblacion
- Rosario
- San Luis
- San Pablo
- Villa Aurora
- Villa Florentino

=== Climate ===
Climate data for Diadi, Nueva Vizcaya
Month	Jan	Feb	Mar	Apr	May	Jun	Jul	Aug	Sep	Oct	Nov	Dec	Year
Mean daily maximum °C (°F)	24 (75)	25 (77)	28 (82)	31 (88)	31 (88)	30 (86)	29 (84)	29 (84)	29 (84)	28 (82)	26 (79)	24 (75)	28 (82)
Mean daily minimum °C (°F)	18 (64)	19 (66)	20 (68)	22 (72)	23 (73)	23 (73)	23 (73)	23 (73)	23 (73)	22 (72)	21 (70)	20 (68)	21 (70)
Average precipitation mm (inches)	119 (4.7)	83 (3.3)	54 (2.1)	37 (1.5)	133 (5.2)	132 (5.2)	161 (6.3)	163 (6.4)	153 (6.0)	142 (5.6)	160 (6.3)	224 (8.8)	1,561 (61.4)
Average rainy days	18.4	13.6	11.6	9.4	19.3	21.9	23.9	23.4	21.1	16.3	18.1	21.4	218.4
Source: Meteoblue

== Demographics ==
Population census of Diadi
Year	Pop.	±% p.a.
1970	4,407	—
1975	6,649	+8.60%
1980	8,605	+5.29%
1990	11,351	+2.81%
1995	12,469	+1.78%
2000	14,374	+3.09%
2007	15,567	+1.11%
2010	16,484	+2.10%
2015	18,122	+1.82%
2020	19,236	+1.26%
2024	20,438	+1.47%
Source: Philippine Statistics Authority

== Economy ==
Poverty incidence of Diadi (%)

Source: Philippine Statistics Authority

=== Tilapia industry ===
On January 11, 2008, the Cagayan Bureau of Fisheries and Aquatic Resources (BFAR) stated that tilapia production grew and Cagayan Valley is now the Philippines’ tilapia capital. Production supply grew 37.25% since 2003, with 14,000 metric tons (MT) in 2007. The recent aquaculture congress found that the growth of tilapia production was due to government interventions: provision of fast-growing species, accreditation of private hatcheries to ensure supply of quality fingerlings, establishment of demonstration farms, providing free fingerlings to newly constructed fishponds, and the dissemination of tilapia to Nueva Vizcaya (in Diadi town). Former cycling champion Lupo Alava is a multi-awarded tilapia raiser in Bagabag, Nueva Vizcaya. Chairman Thompson Lantion of the Land Transportation Franchising and Regulatory Board, a retired two-star police general, has fishponds in La Torre, Bayombong, Nueva Vizcaya. Also, Nueva Vizcaya Gov. Luisa Lloren Cuaresma also entered into similar aquaculture endeavors in addition to tilapia production.

== Government ==
=== Local government ===
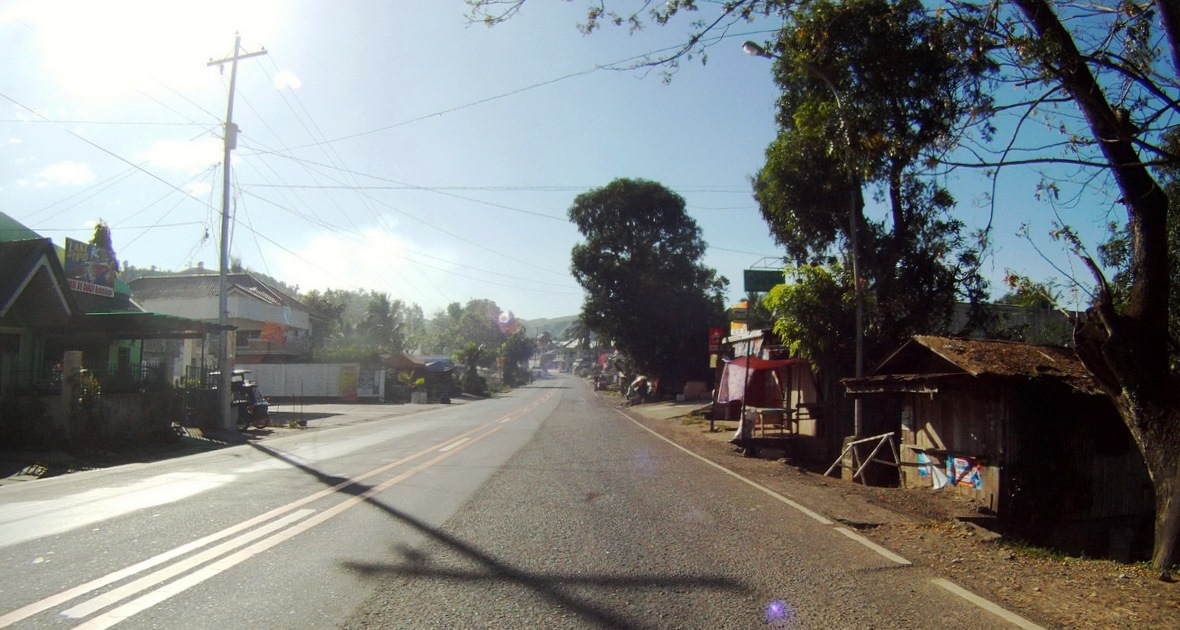
Downtown area

Diadi is part of the lone congressional district of the province of Nueva Vizcaya. It is governed by a mayor, designated as its local chief executive, and by a municipal council as its legislative body in accordance with the Local Government Code. The mayor, vice mayor, and the municipal councilors are elected directly in polls held every three years.

=== Elected officials ===
Members of the Municipal Council (2022–2025)
Position	Name
Governor	Jose V. Gambito
Mayor	Sandy M. Gayaton
Vice-Mayor	Rolito Dulnuan
Councilors	Romelyn Madume
Councilors	Waren Lunag
Councilors	Rhodora F. Bilog
Councilors	Elena G. Llantada
Councilors	Alanvin D. Tacadena
Councilors	Rommel F. Cariño
Councilors	Marvic S. Padilla
Councilors	Wilma Concillo

== Tourism ==
Lower Magat Eco-Tourism Park is located in Municipality of Diadi along the Magat River, a 1,200 hectares (3,000 acres) eco-park acquired by the provincial government for preservation later turned into a nature park. The parks includes lagoons, camping grounds, swimming pools, cottages, and recreational activity facilities for hiking and biking.

== Education ==
The Schools Division of Nueva Vizcaya governs the town's public education system. The division office is a field office of the DepEd in Cagayan Valley region. The Diadi Schools District Office governs all public and private elementary and high schools throughout the municipality.

=== Primary and elementary schools ===
- Ampakleng Elementary School
- Arwas Elementary School
- Balete Elementary School
- Bugnay Elementary School
- Butao Elementary School
- Diadi Central School
- Duruarog Elementary School
- Escoting Elementary School
- Langka Primary School
- Lurad Elementary School
- Nagsabaran Elementary School
- Namamparan Elementary School
- Pallagao Primary School
- Pinya Elementary School
- Rosario Primary School
- San Luis Elementary School
- San Pablo Elementary School
- Villa Aurora Elementary School
- Villa Florentino Elementary School
- Twinklers Learning Center

=== Secondary schools ===
- Diadi National High School
- St. Joseph School
