= Ambaguio =

Municipality in Nueva Vizcaya, Philippines

- Municipality
- Municipality of Ambaguio
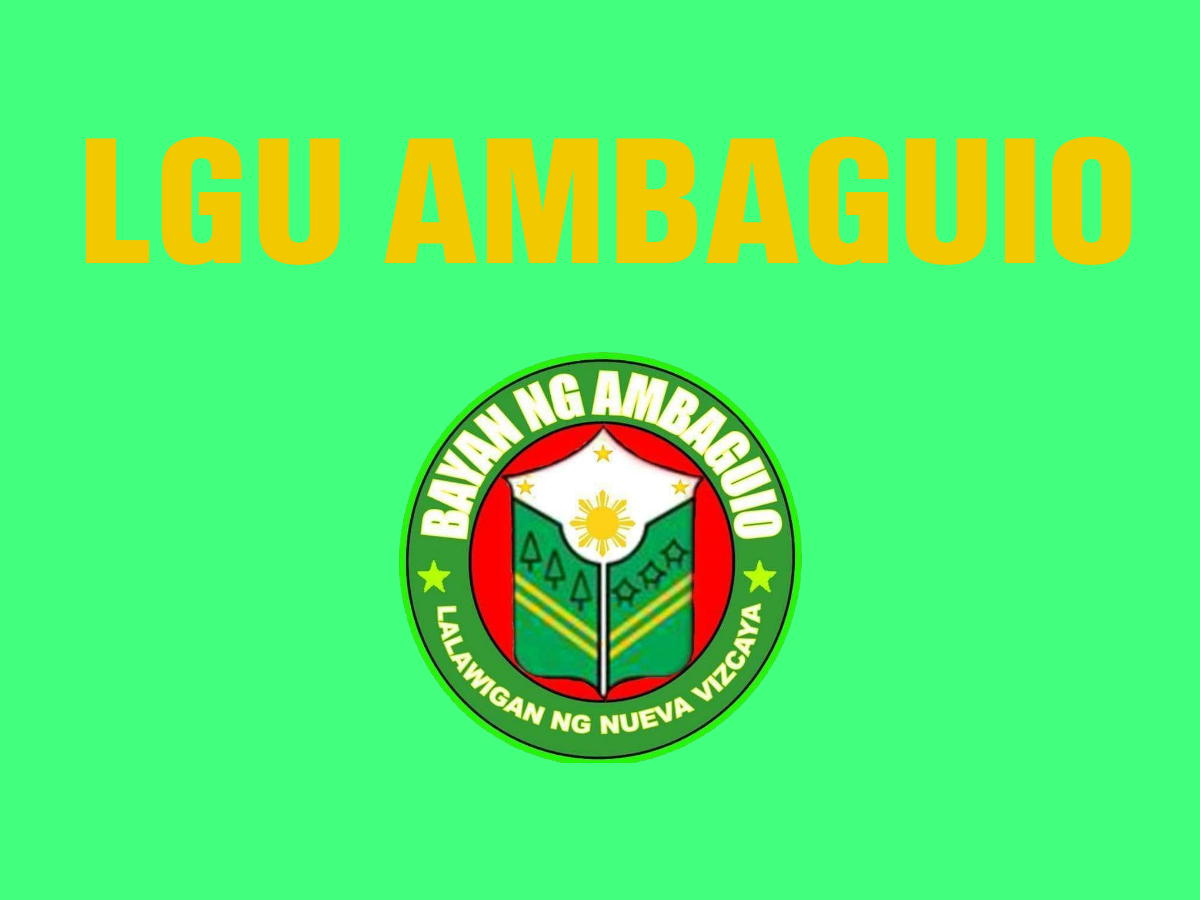
- Flag Seal

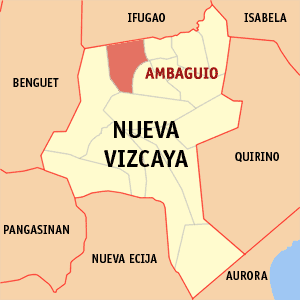
- Map of Nueva Vizcaya with Ambaguio highlighted
- Interactive map of Ambaguio
- Location within the Philippines
- Coordinates: 16°31′54″N 121°01′41″E
- Country: Philippines
- Region: Cagayan Valley
- Province: Nueva Vizcaya
- District: Lone district
- Barangays: 8 (see Barangays)

Government
  - Type: Sangguniang Bayan
  - Mayor: Arnold P. Dinungon
  - Vice Mayor: Nardo C. Agnahe
  - Representative: Timothy Joseph E. Cayton
  - Electorate: 7,833 voters (2025)

Area
  - Total: 156.26 km^{2} (60.33 sq mi)
- Elevation: 952 m (3,123 ft)
- Highest elevation: 1,844 m (6,050 ft)
- Lowest elevation: 497 m (1,631 ft)

Population (2024 census)
  - Total: 16,401
  - Density: 104.96/km^{2} (271.84/sq mi)
  - Households: 3,872

Economy
  - Income class: 4th municipal income class
  - Poverty incidence: 13.08% (2023)
  - Revenue: ₱ 127.7 million (2024)
  - Assets: ₱ 779.5 million (2024)
  - Expenditure: ₱ 136.2 million (2024)
  - Liabilities: ₱ 259.7 million (2024)

Service provider
  - Electricity: Nueva Vizcaya Electric Cooperative (NUVELCO)
- Time zone: UTC+8 (PST)
- ZIP code: 3701
- PSGC: 0205001000
- IDD : area code: +63 (0)78
- Native languages: Ilocano; Kallahan; Tagalog
- Website: https://ambaguio.gov.ph

Ambaguio, officially the Municipality of Ambaguio (Ilocano: Ili ti Ambaguio; Tagalog: Bayan ng Ambaguio), is a municipality in the province of Nueva Vizcaya, Philippines. According to the 2024 census, it has a population of 16,401 people.

== Etymology ==
The name "ambaguio" is derived from the word "bagiw," meaning "moss" which covered every inch of trees and stones in the area. The inhabitants were called "e-am-bagiw" meaning "conqueror of moss." The name underwent a series of changes due to its difficult pronunciation by the lowland people who later settled in the area and to differentiate the town from the more famous City which also had the same etymology, resulting in the present "Ambaguio."

== History ==
A handful of settlers headed by Fausto Tagangtang who came from the neighboring Mountain Province first settled in the area, establishing farmed hills and rice terraces.

Due to its terrain, distance and road problems, the inhabitants were composed only of three major tribes: Igorot, Ifugao, and Ibaloi, who unanimously called the place “Ambaguio”, which means “the land of mosses”, and “its climate is similar to that of Baguio”.

Before its creation as a municipality, Ambaguio was then a barrio of the Municipality of Bayombong. Leonardo B. Perez, then Congressman of Nueva Vizcaya, authored the bill seeking for the creation of Ambaguio as an independent municipality. The bill was approved on 18 June 1966 by virtue of Republic Act. No. 4735. In the same year, Mariano L. Agnahe, the then Barrio Lieutenant, was appointed as the first mayor of the town.

== Geography ==
Ambaguio is situated 24.34 kilometres (15.12 mi) from the provincial capital Bayombong, and 313.95 kilometres (195.08 mi) from the country's capital city of Manila.

=== Barangays ===
Ambaguio is politically subdivided into 8 barangays. Each barangay consists of puroks and some have sitios.

- Ammoweg
- Camandag
- Labang
- Napo
- Poblacion
- Salingsingan
- Tiblac
- Dulli

=== Climate ===
Climate data for Ambaguio, Nueva Vizcaya
Month	Jan	Feb	Mar	Apr	May	Jun	Jul	Aug	Sep	Oct	Nov	Dec	Year
Mean daily maximum °C (°F)	21 (70)	22 (72)	23 (73)	25 (77)	25 (77)	24 (75)	23 (73)	23 (73)	23 (73)	23 (73)	23 (73)	21 (70)	23 (73)
Mean daily minimum °C (°F)	13 (55)	14 (57)	15 (59)	17 (63)	18 (64)	18 (64)	18 (64)	18 (64)	18 (64)	17 (63)	15 (59)	14 (57)	16 (61)
Average precipitation mm (inches)	38 (1.5)	57 (2.2)	77 (3.0)	141 (5.6)	390 (15.4)	355 (14.0)	426 (16.8)	441 (17.4)	426 (16.8)	259 (10.2)	97 (3.8)	57 (2.2)	2,764 (108.9)
Average rainy days	10.4	12.1	15.4	20.4	26.7	27.1	28.7	28.0	26.4	19.9	14.1	12.3	241.5
Source: Meteoblue

== Demographics ==
Population census of Ambaguio
Year	Pop.	±% p.a.
1970	1,416	—
1975	3,000	+16.25%
1980	3,856	+5.15%
1990	7,241	+6.51%
1995	9,485	+5.19%
2000	9,750	+0.59%
2007	11,499	+2.30%
2010	13,452	+5.87%
2015	15,250	+2.42%
2020	15,472	+0.30%
2024	16,401	+1.41%
Source: Philippine Statistics Authority

== Economy ==
Poverty incidence of Ambaguio (%)

Source: Philippine Statistics Authority

== Government ==
=== Local government ===
Ambaguio is part of the lone congressional district of the province of Nueva Vizcaya. It is governed by a mayor, designated as its local chief executive, and by a municipal council as its legislative body in accordance with the Local Government Code. The mayor, vice mayor, and the municipal councilors are elected directly in polls held every three years.

=== Elected officials ===
Members of the Municipal Council (2022–2025)
Position	Name
Congressman	Timothy Joseph E. Cayton
Mayor	Ronelio B. Danao
Vice-Mayor	Leon M. Lino
Councilors	Mando B. Balaso
Councilors	Geraldo D. Lino
Councilors	Milany B. Emilio-Tidong
Councilors	Philip Ceasar A. Abiado
Councilors	Elias M. Wayas
Councilors	Decoran G. Allawas
Councilors	Felix O. Dinagwatan
Councilors	Ferdinand C. Balagsa

== Tourism ==
The Municipality of Ambaguio is famous for being a gateway to Luzon’s tallest peak, Mount Pulag.

In 2019, Violet Lucasi, a former employee of Etihad Airways opened Nueva Vizcaya (NV) Paragliding, which later became the Ambaguio Skyport, in Barangay Tiblac, attracting both local and foreign tourists. As the Philippines' first domestic paragliding "Airport terminal", this led to Ambaguio being awarded P25 million by the Department of Tourism's Tourism Champions Challenge on April 15, 2024. On April 30 however, the venue closed due to safety issues raised by authorities.

== Education ==
The Schools Division of Nueva Vizcaya governs the town's public education system. The division office is a field office of the DepEd in Cagayan Valley region. The Ambaguio Schools District Office governs all the public and private elementary and high schools throughout the municipality.

=== Primary and elementary schools ===
- Ambaguio Central School
- Ammoweg Elementary School
- Bagingey Elementary School
- Balong Elementary School
- Cablahan Elementary School
- Daclig Elementary School
- Dulli Integrated School (Elementary)
- Hamhamaan Elementary School
- Hiket Elementary School
- Hukhukyung Primary School
- Labang Elementary School
- Laylaya Primary School
- Lihlit Primary School
- Napo Elementary School
- Pacdal Elementary School
- Pihipi Elementary School
- Salingsingan Elementary School
- Tiblac Elementary School

=== Secondary schools ===
- Ambaguio High School
- Dulli Integrated School
- Tiblac National High School
