= Dupax del Norte anti-mining protests =

Series of protests from 2025 to 2026

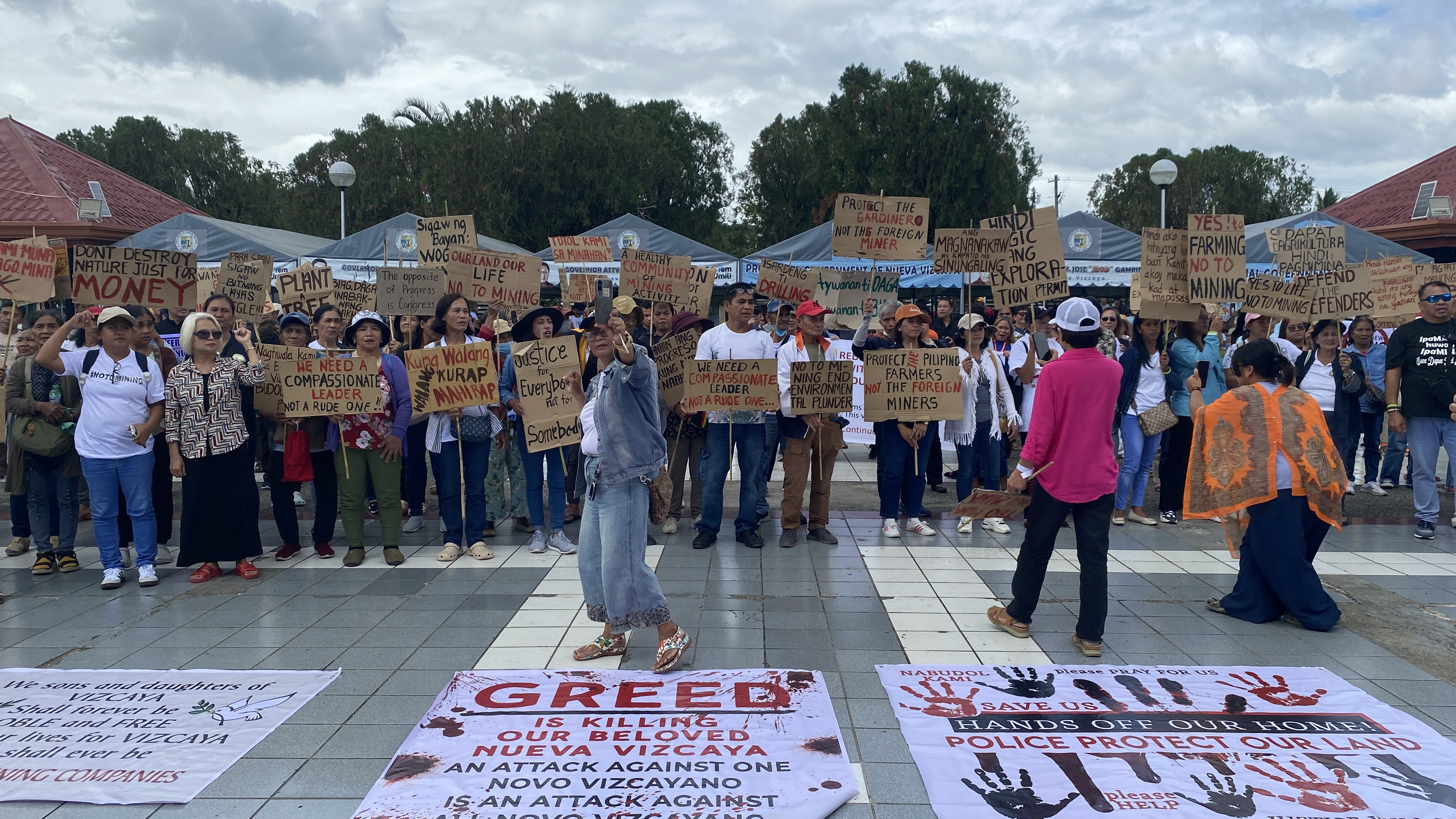
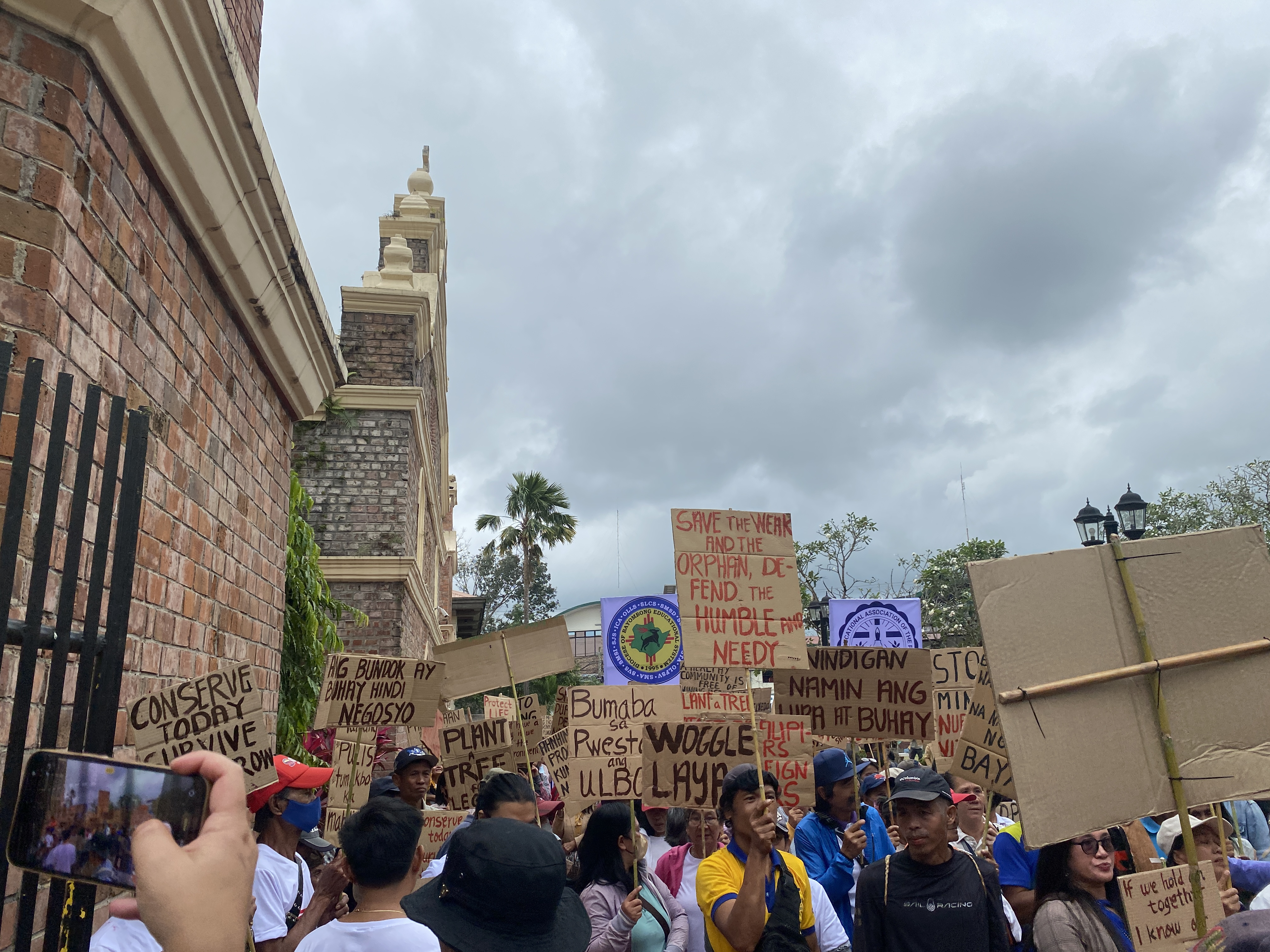
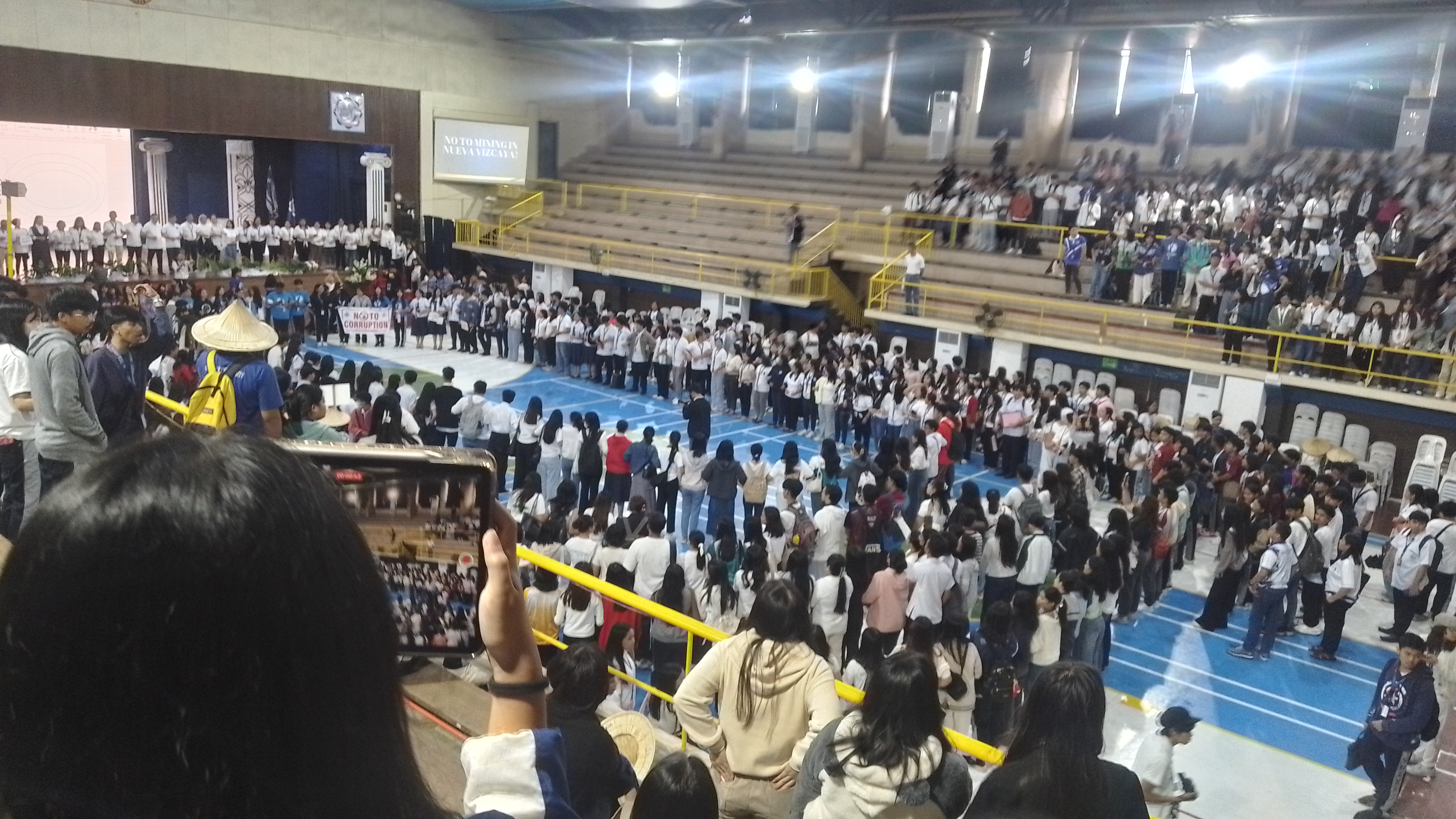
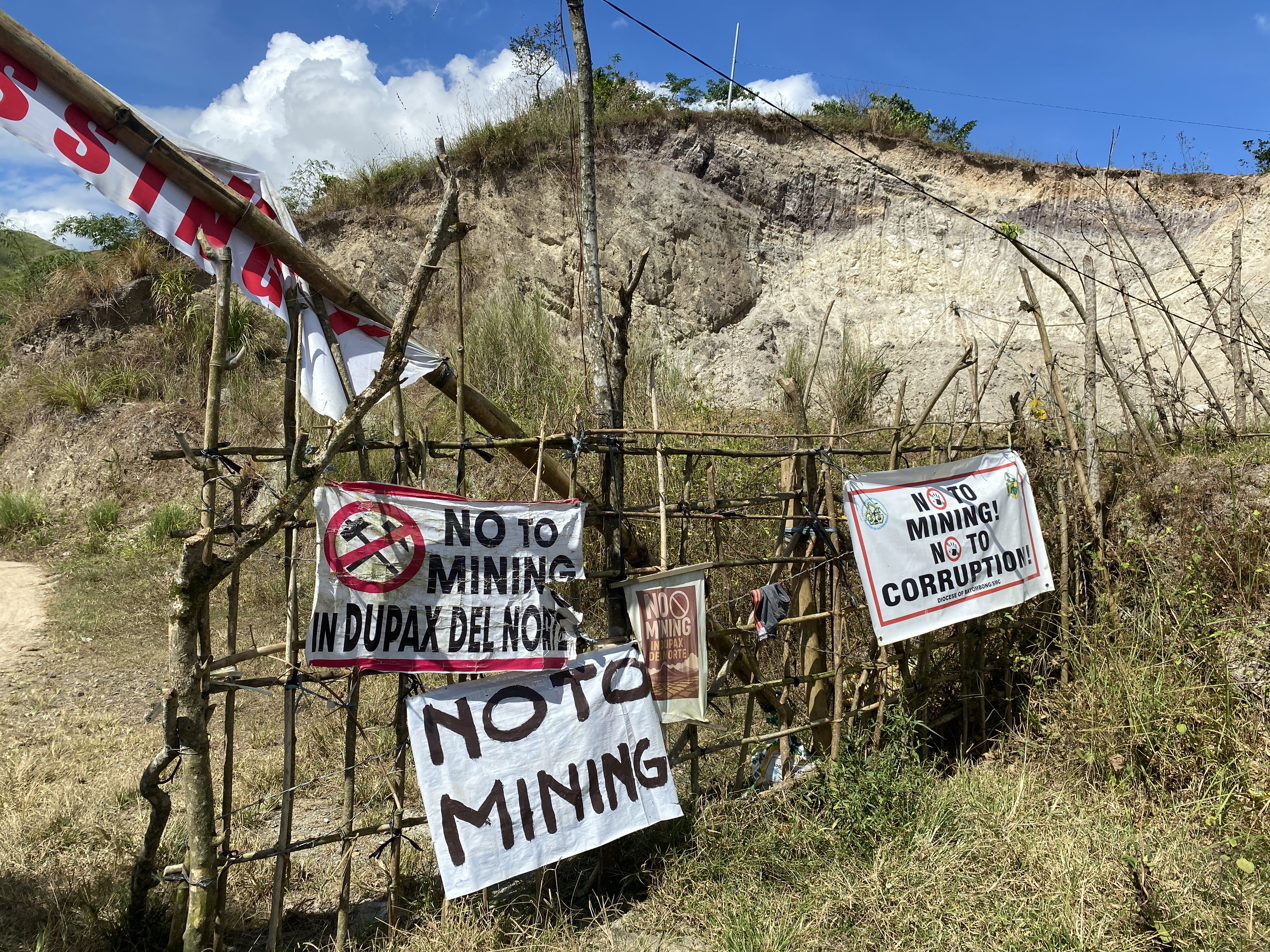
- Clockwise from top: Protests at the Nueva Vizcaya Provincial Capitol, protests at Saint Mary's University, "No To Mining" and "No to Corruption" signs in Dupax del Norte, protests at the Bayombong Cathedral
- Date: August 7, 2025 – March 2026 (6 months, 3 weeks and 1 day)
- Location: Dupax del Norte, Nueva Vizcaya
- Caused by: Woggle Corporation being granted an exploration permit by the Mines and Geosciences Bureau without community consultation; Complacency by government officials
- Goals: Revocation of Woggle Corporation's exploration permit; End to mining in Dupax del Norte; End to mining in the province of Nueva Vizcaya
- Methods: Blockades and barricades
- Result: Runruno mine to cease operations at the end of 2026; Exploration permit of Woggle suspended; Woggle equipment removed from or disposed at the exploration site; Barricades remain standing in roads leading to the site

Parties
Residents of Nueva Vizcaya: Barangay captains of Bitnong, Inaban, Mungia, Parai, and Oyao; Dupax del Norte Environmental Defenders: Florentino Daynos II; Religious groups: Diocese of Bayombong: Jose Elmer Mangalinao; Supported by: Catholic Bishops' Conference of the Philippines; Catholic Educational Association of the Philippines; International Coalition for Human Rights in the Philippines; Kalikasan People's Network for the Environment; League of Municipalities of the Philippines - Nueva Vizcaya Chapter; Lawmakers and activists: 4 House representatives; 3 senators; Teddy Baguilat	Metals Exploration plc: FCF Minerals Corporation; Woggle Corporation

Casualties
- Arrested: 7 protestors (including Daynos) and one security guard

From August 2025 to March 2026, barricades and protests in Dupax del Norte in the northern Philippines blocked mining exploration activities by Woggle Corporation, a subsidiary of FCF Minerals Corporation and Metals Exploration plc. The protests, led by environmentalists under the name Dupax del Norte Environmental Defenders and the local Catholic diocese, are held in the province of Nueva Vizcaya, whose residents have long protested against the environmental impacts of mining. Nueva Vizcaya sits on numerous protected areas and watersheds, with the town of Dupax del Norte situated within the Dupax Watershed Forest Reserve. Woggle Corporation maintains that it secured the necessary requirements for its exploration permit issued by the Mines and Geosciences Bureau (MGB) of the Department of Environment and Natural Resources (DENR), though local officials and residents dispute this, saying that no proper consultations took place—a requirement for the issuance of its exploration permit. Protestors also allege Woggle of illegally executing its exploration activities by uprooting trees without the necessary permits and trespassing.

Barricades in Dupax del Norte started on September 17, blocking Woggle's exploration in the area. Subsequently, Woggle requested a writ of preliminary injunction from the local courts, which was granted on October 10. As protestors refused to take down the barricades, the court ordered the police to take down the barricades and arrest protestors. Exploration then continued, until barricades were reinstalled. Local police hesitated to bring down the barricades until multiple orders were issued by the local court directing the police to enforce the writ. The police then dismantled the barricades and arrested protestors on January 23, 2026. On February 5, the MGB suspended Woggle's exploration permit under the grounds of force majeure. As a result, FCF Minerals Corporation decided to close down its existing Runruno mine by the end of 2026.

Environmental groups and lawmakers have supported the protestors, holding additional protests at the DENR main office in Quezon City. In February and March 2026, hearings were held at the Senate of the Philippines to investigate the alleged bypass of local government consultations. At the hearing, Woggle agreed to pull its equipment out of the exploration sites in Dupax del Norte. Woggle and environmentalists later reached an agreement to finally remove the equipment in May 2026, with removal completed in July 2026.

== Background ==
Area covered by the Woggle Corporation Exploration Permit.: Dupax del Norte municipal border; Exploration permit tenement location; Barangay borders of Bitnong, Inaban, Mungia, Parai, and Oyao; Purok Keon Junction, site of many anti-mining protests and barricades

Dupax del Norte is a town in the province of Nueva Vizcaya. It is 280 kilometres (170 mi) north of Manila. The town sits partly within the Magat River Basin, which is a tributary to the Cagayan River. It is also within the Casecnan Protected Landscape that covers Casecnan River, another major tributary to the Cagayan River. The Dupax Watershed Forest Reserve was proclaimed as a forest reserve in August 1934 and was proposed to be included as a protected landscape under the NIPAS Act in 2000. Local science NGO Advocates of Science and Technology for the People warns that mining in the town could affect these nearby protected areas. Across multiple towns in Nueva Vizcaya, ten areas fall under environmental protection. Communities in Nueva Vizcaya have long protested mining due to its potential threats to agriculture and the ecosystem, starting with the Didipio mine (operated by OceanaGold) which began operations in 1994. Mining operations in Didipio and Runruno have been blamed for water depletion, environmental damage, and societal conflict. 44% of Cagayan Valley's mineral resources are from Nueva Vizcaya. This includes limestone, manganese, gold, and copper.

Metals Exploration plc (MTL)—through its subsidiary, FCF Minerals Corporation—currently operates a gold and molybdenum mine in Quezon, Nueva Vizcaya. FCF was incorporated in 2001, and later became a subsidiary for London-based Metals Exploration plc in September 2005. Mining clearance for the Runruno Gold–Molybdenum Project was granted in 2011, following five years of exploration. Typhoon Koppu in 2015 suspended construction works in the mine from October 2015 to April 2016. It began operations in 2017, expecting an output of 96,700 ounces (2,740 kg) of gold yearly over 10 years of operation. Excise tax from the mine's operations have since brought Quezon from a fourth-class municipality (a municipality earning ₱90–130 million annually) to a first-class municipality (earning over ₱200 million annually). As of 2025, FCF had contributed ₱5.71 billion (US$115.94 million) in taxes, fees, and duties since operations started in 2017. It also operates a social development program which supports welfare and infrastructure programs in the area. Prior to the protests, Quezon mayor Dolores Binwag called the Runruno project instrumental for improvements in local infrastructure. The Runruno mine will cease operations by the end of 2026.

Woggle Corporation, a subsidiary of FCF, announced that it had received an exploration permit from the Mines and Geosciences Bureau (MGB) of the Department of Environment and Natural Resources for 3,101.1 hectares (7,663 acres) in Dupax del Norte on August 7, 2025, and immediately began geophysics surveys in the area. The exploration permit covers five barangays in Dupax del Norte: Bitnong, Inaban, Mungia, Parai, and Oyao. MTL planned to use the existing ore processing facilities in Runruno to handle ore found and mined in the new area. In a press release, Woggle also said that it had received a Certificate of Non-Overlap from the National Commission on Indigenous Peoples, which confirmed that there were no recognized indigenous cultural communities or ancestral domains within the exploration area.

== 2025 ==
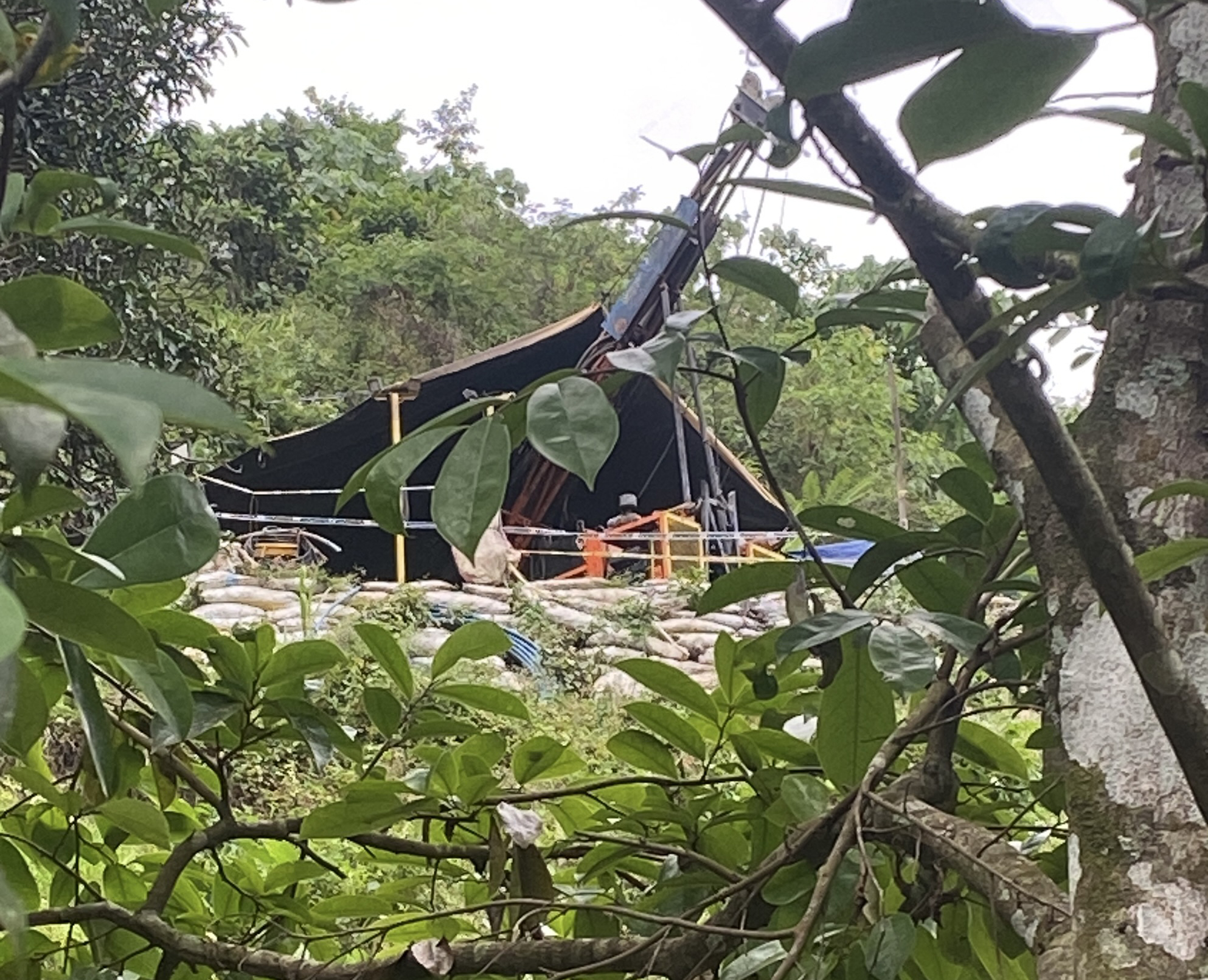
Mining operations in Dupax del Norte.

As a requirement for its exploration permit, Woggle requested a Certificate of Consultation from the council of Oyao, a barangay in Dupax del Norte. However, the Oyao council denied the request on August 25. Oyao barangay chairman Junior Taligan denied that a proper consultation had taken place, stating that a meeting held by Woggle on August 15, 2025, only being an "information and education campaign". Local officials and residents soon sent their complaints to the MGB, alleging violations of the Dupax del Norte mine's exploration permit, such as the uprooting of trees and trespassing. A resident also reported that Woggle had begun building a road up to a site in purok Keon in Bitnong. A pastoral letter by bishop Jose Elmer Mangalinao of the Diocese of Bayombong denounced the MGB's approval of Woggle's mining exploration permit. He also questions officials who backed the permit, urging for "transparency, accountability, and action from those in power." On August 18, the provincial board of Nueva Vizcaya adopted a resolution requesting that the MGB cancel Woggle Corporation's exploration permit for violations of environmental and procedural requirements. Two days later, the provincial board of Nueva Vizcaya voted to issue a Certificate of Consultation to Woggle following a briefing with the company, with only one member objecting.

Tim Cayton, the incumbent House representative of Nueva Vizcaya and former mayor of Dupax del Norte, also sent letters to the MGB on August 20 and 26, highlighting the lack of public consultations prior to the start of Woggle's exploration in the town. As a response, MGB Region II Director Mario Ancheta ordered an investigation into the complaints.

Woggle executives including general manager Lorne Harvey walked out of a community consultation on September 7 after refusing to listen to community leaders of barangay Mungia, who were protesting against their exploration project. In the meeting, president Roger Molina of the Mungia Multipurpose Farmers Cooperative said that Woggle focused on presenting business plans instead of responding to allegations of "illegal mining exploration". Woggle then held a public forum on the mining exploration at the Dupax del Norte Sports Complex on September 12. Florentino Daynos II, a local community leader of anti-mining groups, accused the forum of being one-sided, as it only allowed three people to speak against mining: Manganilao, and provincial board members Emerlene Jane Galanta-Martinez and Pablo Kindot. By the time the opposition was allowed to speak, several provincial officials including Cayton had already left. On the same day, the municipal board of Dupax del Norte voted unanimously to deny issuing Woggle a Certificate of Consultation.

Mass protests against mining in the province continued into September, joined by residents, religious leaders, lawyers, and advocates in Nueva Vizcaya. On September 17, residents of Bitnong set up barricades on private pathways to prevent mining equipment from entering the area. A resident also complained of mining equipment being left at a private lot without permission. Woggle Corporation then asked the court to issue a temporary restraining order (TRO) and a writ of preliminary injunction against the barricades, saying that it was an illegal obstruction of a public road and the exploration permit given to them. On October 8, the League of Municipalities of the Philippines-Nueva Vizcaya Chapter passed a resolution expressing "strong" opposition to future plans of mining activities in the Province.

Judge Paul Attolba Jr. of the Regional Trial Court of Bambang (Branch 30) issued a TRO against the protestors on October 10. The TRO banned protestors from maintaining a barricade along the Keon barangay road, Bitnong, and the national highway. The TRO was then extended 20 days to October 30. After protesters refused to bring down their barricades, on October 16, Attolba ordered the Philippine National Police to arrest protestors who defied the TRO and to charge them with indirect contempt of court. Subsequently, the protestors clashed with the police on October 17 as they dismantled the barricades. Woggle continued exploration activities shortly after.

Protests continued on October 20 at the People's Hall of Dupax del Norte, where protestors called for intervention by elected officials. Environmental groups, indigenous peoples, and farmers protested in front of the Department of Environment and Natural Resources (DENR) main office in Quezon City on October 21, with the Dupax mine as one of their agenda. The same day, Filipinos in the United Kingdom staged a protest in front of MTL headquarters in London. In November, Manganilao appealed to President Bongbong Marcos, asking him to intervene and halt mining operations in Nueva Vizcaya.

== 2026 ==
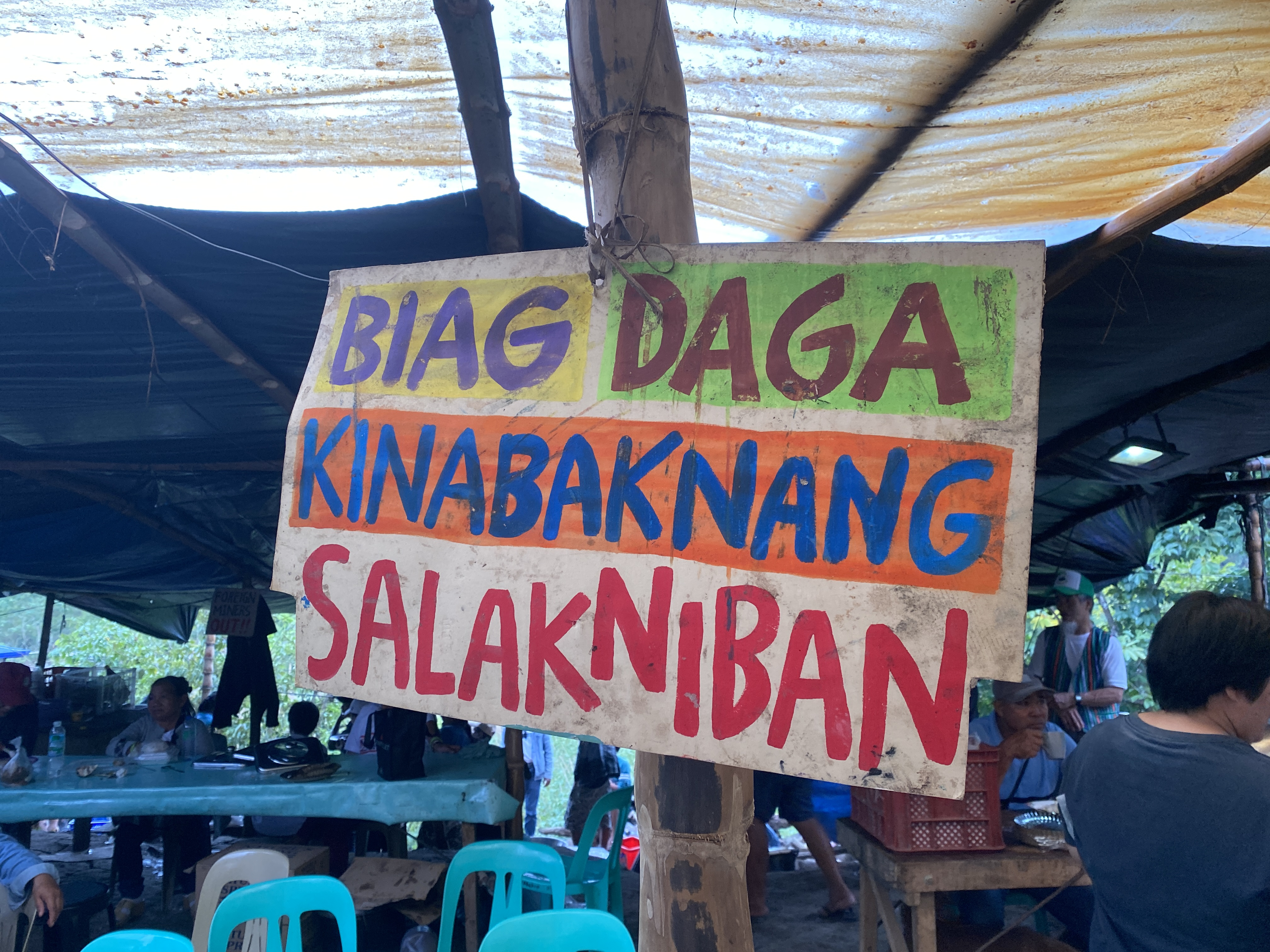
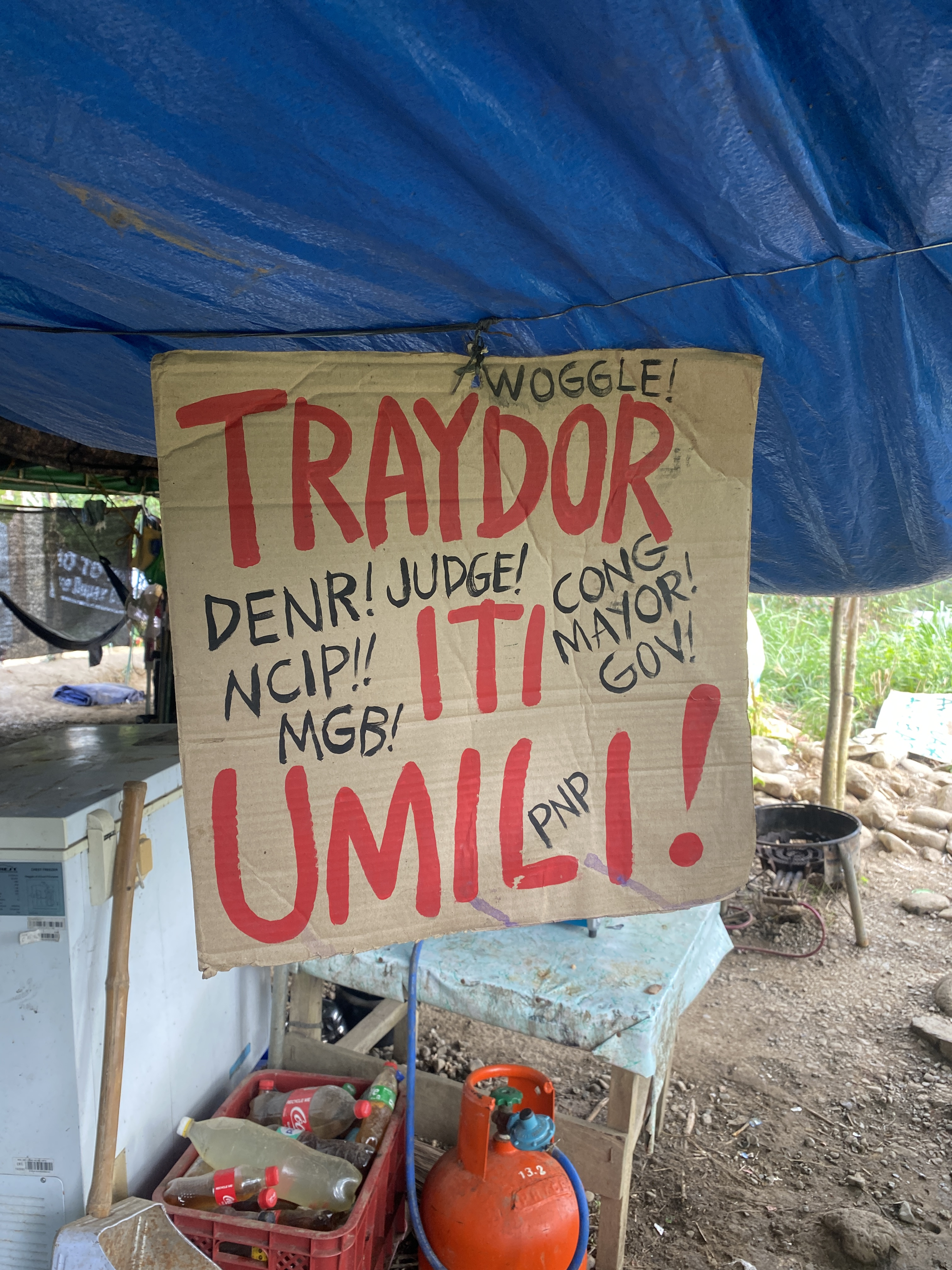
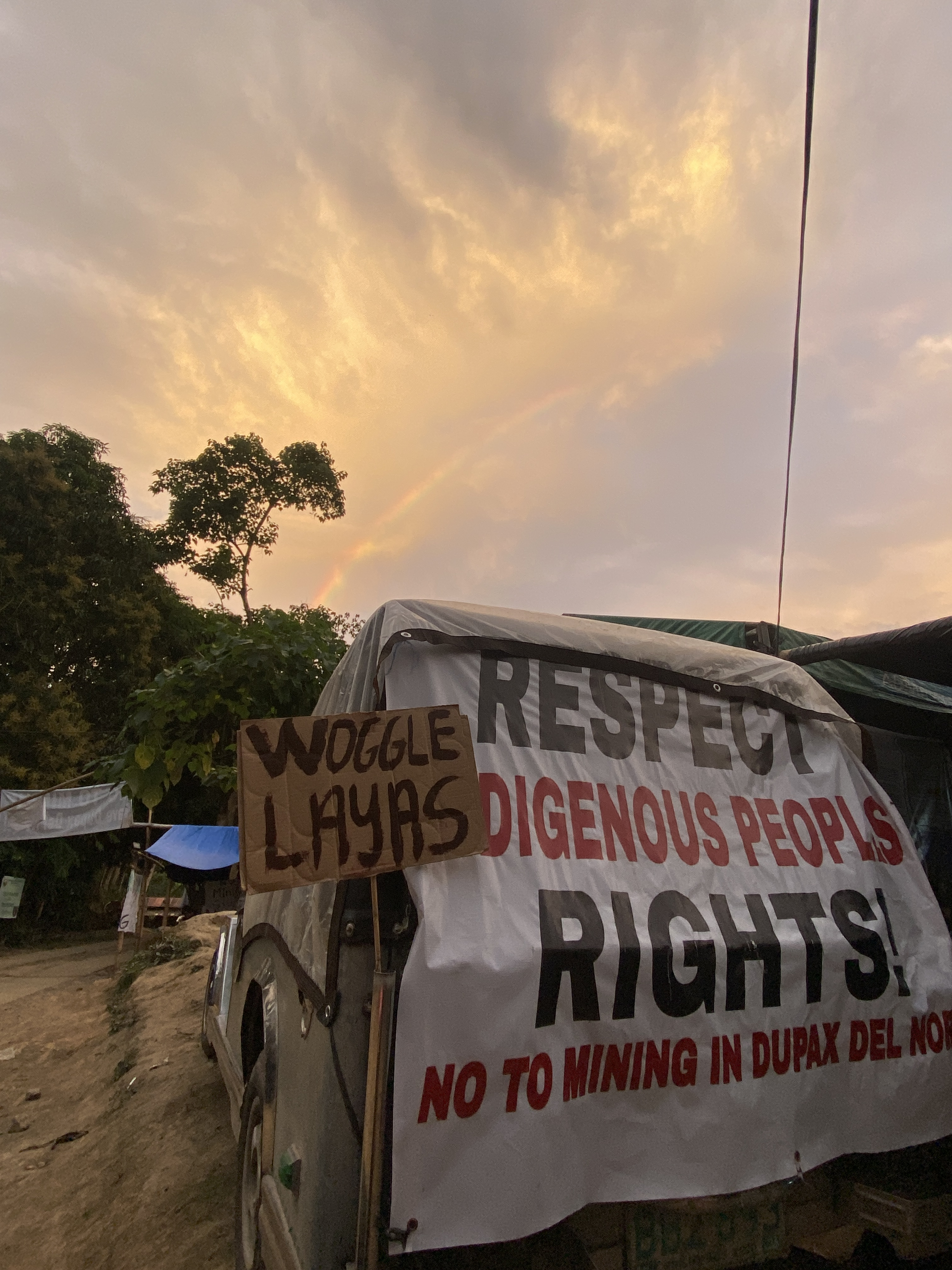
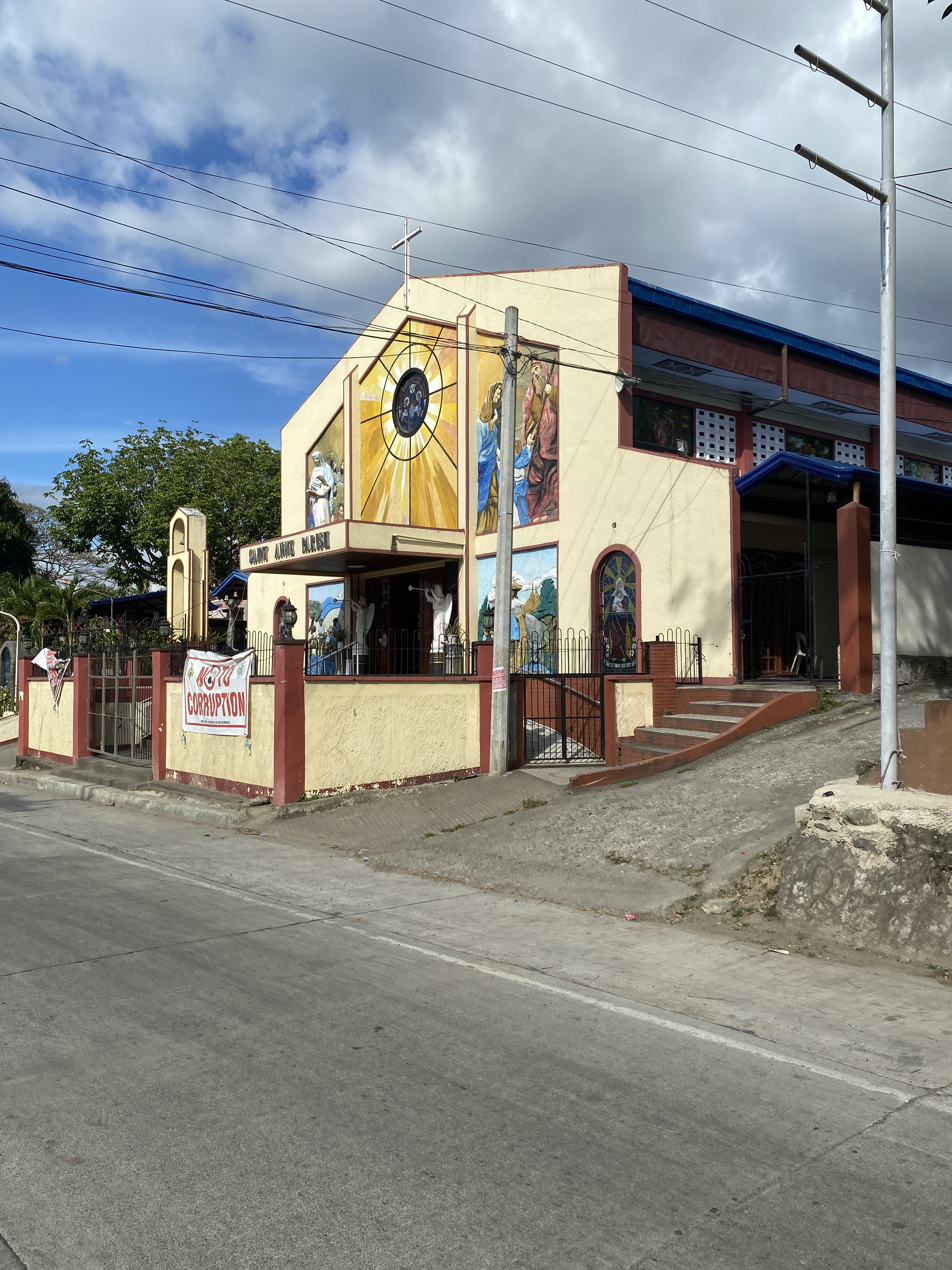
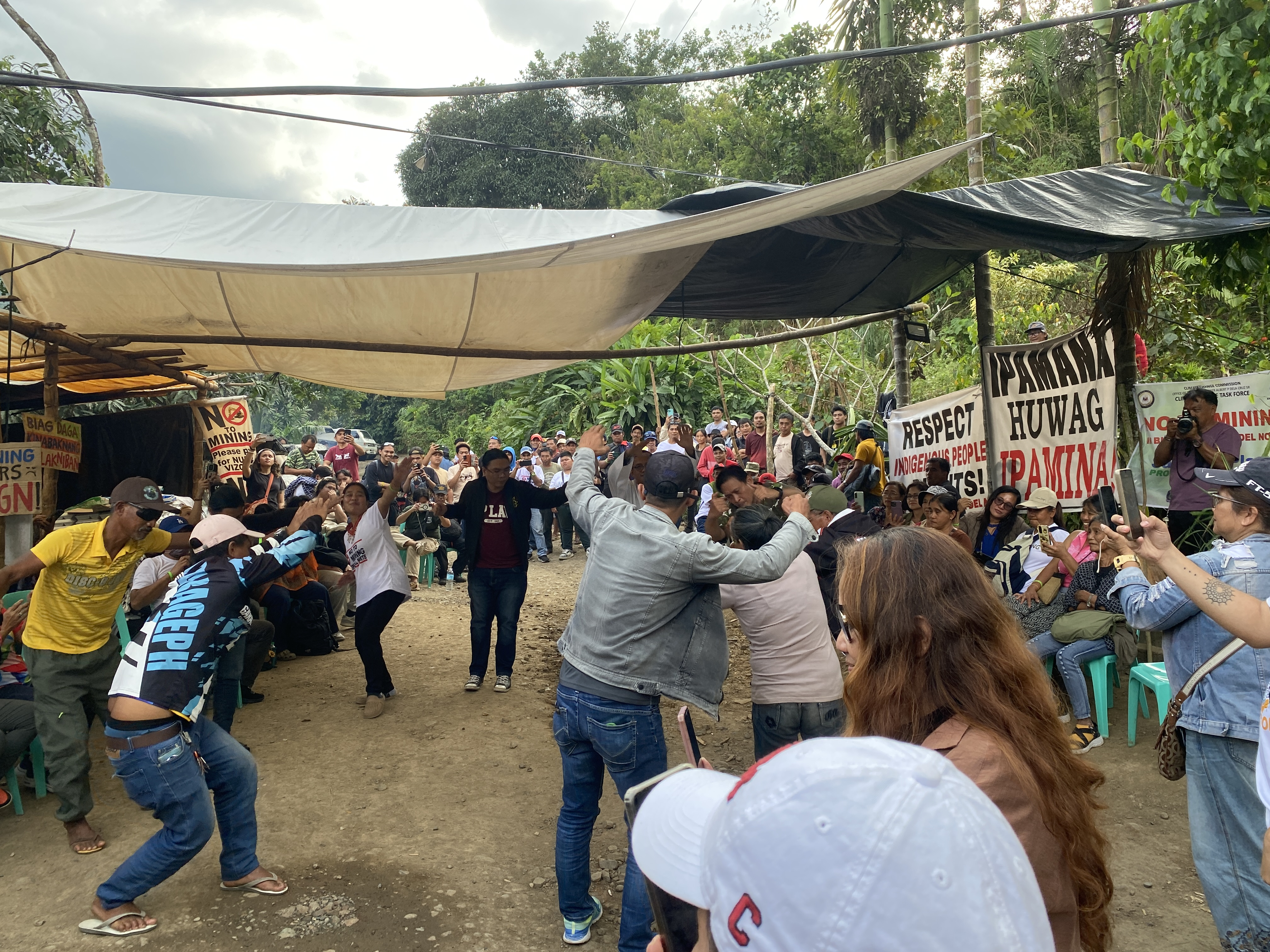
Various signs and placards at protest sites in Dupax. Protests also usually include Igorot indigenous community dances called tayaw.

Barricades continued into the new year. Originally five, only one barricade remained standing, located in Bitnong. On January 6, Attolba issued a resolution denying motions to lift the writ of preliminary injunction against the protests. Attolba ordered the writ's defendants, which included Daynos and other protest groups, to instead take the matter to the MGB's Panel of Arbitrators, immediately remove all barricades in Keon, and stop obstructing Woggle personnel and equipment. Locals had already filed an injunction suit against the exploration permit and a petition to cancel Woggle's permit before the MGB, with an intent to bring the suit to the Court of Appeals. Protestors continued their blockade on January 13. Defendants to the injunction were absent but the barricade remained defended by other residents. Edgardo Balgos, the lawyer for the protestors and former Nueva Vizcaya Board Member, requested a few days to convince the residents to leave the protest site, but Woggle refused. The Nueva Vizcaya Police Provincial Office (NVPPO) deployed 317 officers to the site, exercising maximum restraint given strong criticism following the earlier removal of a barricade in October. As a metal gate blocking the site was dismantled, protestors continued to block access to the road, sang Pilipinas Kong Mahal (English: Philippines, My Philippines) and the provincial hymn in Ilocano, and held a prayer.

On January 19, Attolba again issued a new order to authorities to enforce the earlier writ, following a January 14 report from the provincial police chief. The report stated that the police had temporarily suspended after protestors formed a human barricade. The order authorized the police to arrest those who continue blocking the implementation of the writ and to submit their names to the court to be charged with contempt. NVPPO deployed over 300 police officers to enforce the order, met with a protest group of over 200. According to the NVPPO, the police observed maximum tolerance throughout the dispersal. This led to the arrest of eight people on January 23. Seven of the arrested were protestors from the barricade, two of which had fainted and were given medical attention before being sent to jail. A security guard from Woggle was also arrested. The arrested protestors were later identified as six peasant Indigenous women and Florentino Daynos. The prosecutor's office later dismissed cases of resistance and disobedience, obstruction of justice, and direct assault against the seven protestors. On January 24, a day after the arrested protestors were cleared of charges, the barricade continued.

On January 28, Attolba issued a new order motu proprio directing the seven protestors to show cause on why they should not be cited in contempt. This followed a January 23 report from the NVPPO chief which detailed continued acts of obstruction and resistance from the protestors. The court also accused Daynos of sharing Facebook posts urging protestors to converge in the area in defiance of the injunction. Attolba issued another show cause order on February 5 to 20 protestors, including Daynos, for reinstalling the barricade after the previous one had been removed on January 23. In addition, it admonished the lawyers of the protestors, who were reported by the police to have been questioning and challenging officers at the scene.

On February 2, a local ordinance aimed at setting a moratorium against mining for 50 years was rejected by the provincial board, citing it as beyond the authority of the province due to existing laws (namely the Philippine Mining Act). In a privilege speech, Senator Erwin Tulfo called for a senate investigation into the exploration activities, the forceful dispersal of protestors on January 23, and the DENR-MGB's issuance of an exploration permit despite the lack of consultation from residents and local officials. Senator Kiko Pangilinan filed a resolution for a Senate investigation on February 9.

=== Suspension of the exploration permit and Senate hearing ===
On February 5, the MGB temporarily suspended the exploration permit of Woggle on the grounds of force majeure. The MGB cited the sustained community opposition which raised concerns about public safety as reasoning for its suspension. Woggle was also ordered to cease and desist from all exploration activities in the area of their permit until the suspension is lifted, which is when the conditions of force majeure have ceased and safe operational conditions are restored. Woggle pushed back against the suspension, insisting that it had not violated any of the terms of its permit and that the government should address the barricades instead of penalizing the permit holder. Protests in Nueva Vizcaya continued, with the goal of the complete cancellation of the exploration permit. On February 12, a protest was held in the provincial capital, Bayombong, calling for the revocation of the permit and the dismissal of contempt charges against the protestors. On February 18, FCF Minerals Corporation announced in a statement that it would be fully closing the Runruno mine, having fully exhausted its ore reserves. FCF also cited the suspension of the exploration permit as a contributing factor, as a replacement ore reserve would have extended operations at the Runruno mine. Due to the suspension and a cited lack of regulatory clarity, FCF wrote that "reserve replacement is no longer feasible within the project's remaining timeline."

Hearings in the Senate under the joint committees on Local Government and Environment, Natural Resources and Climate Change started on February 23, 2026. A second hearing happened on March 3 where Woggle, represented by its president Tommy Alfonso, agreed to pull out its equipment from the exploration site within three days. After pulling out the equipment, Woggle would then perform rehabilitation on the affected area within a month. Committee Chairperson Jinggoy Estrada left the decision on cancelling Woggle's exploration permit to the MGB.

At a dialogue held on May 5, 2026, environmentalists and Woggle Corporation reached an agreement to pull out all remaining drilling equipment from Bitnong. The dialogue was facilitated by the local government through Dupax del Norte Vice Mayor Ric Ronelson Asuncion. A deadline was set for July 5, 2026, after which all equipment that still remained at the site would no longer be retrieved. On May 20, Daynos and Novy Tagure posted bail amounting to ₱36,510 (US$741.32) each over grave coercion charges. The charges were filed at the Municipal Trial Court of Dupax del Norte by Neri Monsanto, who was identified by local residents as a Woggle Corporation employee.

== Reactions ==
On October 27, 2025, House Representative Leila de Lima issued a resolution seeking a probe into the alleged illegal exploration activities and the possible cancellation of its exploration permit. Representatives Renee Co and Sarah Elago also filed similar resolutions in the House of Representatives on October 30. Environmentalist group Kalikasan People's Network for the Environment (KPNE) again staged a protest at the DENR main office in protest of the January 19 court order issued by Attolba. KPNE spokesperson Jonila Castro called it "a clear case of state-backed corporate plunder", while Renee Co said that the court and police were being used to "silence legitimate, collective resistance." Former House representative Carlos Isagani Zarate also called for the release of those arrested.

Following the arrests, the International Coalition for Human Rights in the Philippines (ICHRP) condemned the "overkill deployment and overwhelming use of force" and alleged that the exploration permits of Woggle were obtained by using signature sheets for receiving aid packs as proof of free, prior, and informed consent. The ICHRP also called on Marcos to intervene. Miss Philippines Earth Joy Barcoma voiced support for the protestors in a social media post. In a January 27 statement, Indigenous activist Teddy Baguilat called for the protection of indigenous peoples and environmentalists in Dupax del Norte. The Catholic Educational Association of the Philippines and the Catholic Bishops' Conference of the Philippines also joined calls to protect the welfare of Dupax del Norte residents and to reassess the exploration permit held by Woggle.

== See also ==
- Mining in the Philippines
- Didipio mine
