= Bayombong Cathedral =

Roman Catholic church in Nueva Vizcaya, Philippines

- Saint Dominic de Guzman Cathedral
- Catedral de Santo Domingo de Bayombong (Spanish)
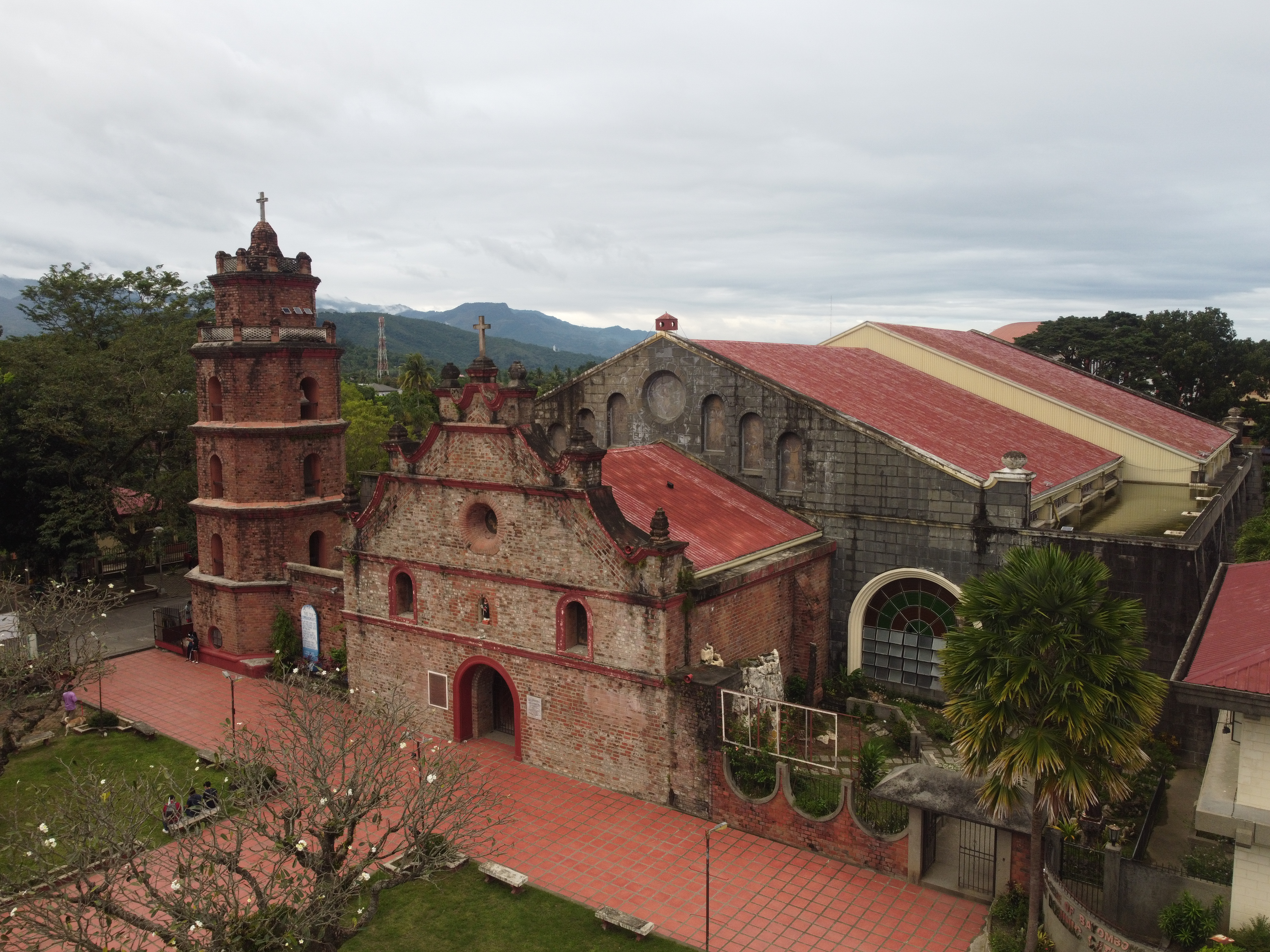
- The cathedral in 2020

- Location in Luzon Location in the Philippines
- 16°29′02″N 121°09′02″E
- Location: Bayombong, Nueva Vizcaya
- Country: Philippines
- Denomination: Roman Catholic

History
- Status: Cathedral

Architecture
- Functional status: Active
- Architectural type: Church building
- Style: Baroque

Specifications
- Materials: Brick, sand, stone, gravel, cement, steel, concrete

Administration
- Archdiocese: Tuguegarao
- Diocese: Bayombong

Clergy
- Archbishop: Most Rev. Ricardo L. Baccay, D.D.
- Bishop(s): Most Rev. Jose Elmer Mangalinao, D.D.

Saint Dominic de Guzman Cathedral, commonly known as Bayombong Cathedral, is an 18th-century, Baroque Roman Catholic church located at Brgy. Don Tomas Maddela, Bayombong, Nueva Vizcaya, Philippines. The cathedral, which is the seat of the Diocese of Bayombong, is under the patronage of Saint Dominic and was originally founded in 1739 by the Augustinian Friars of Spain.

== History ==
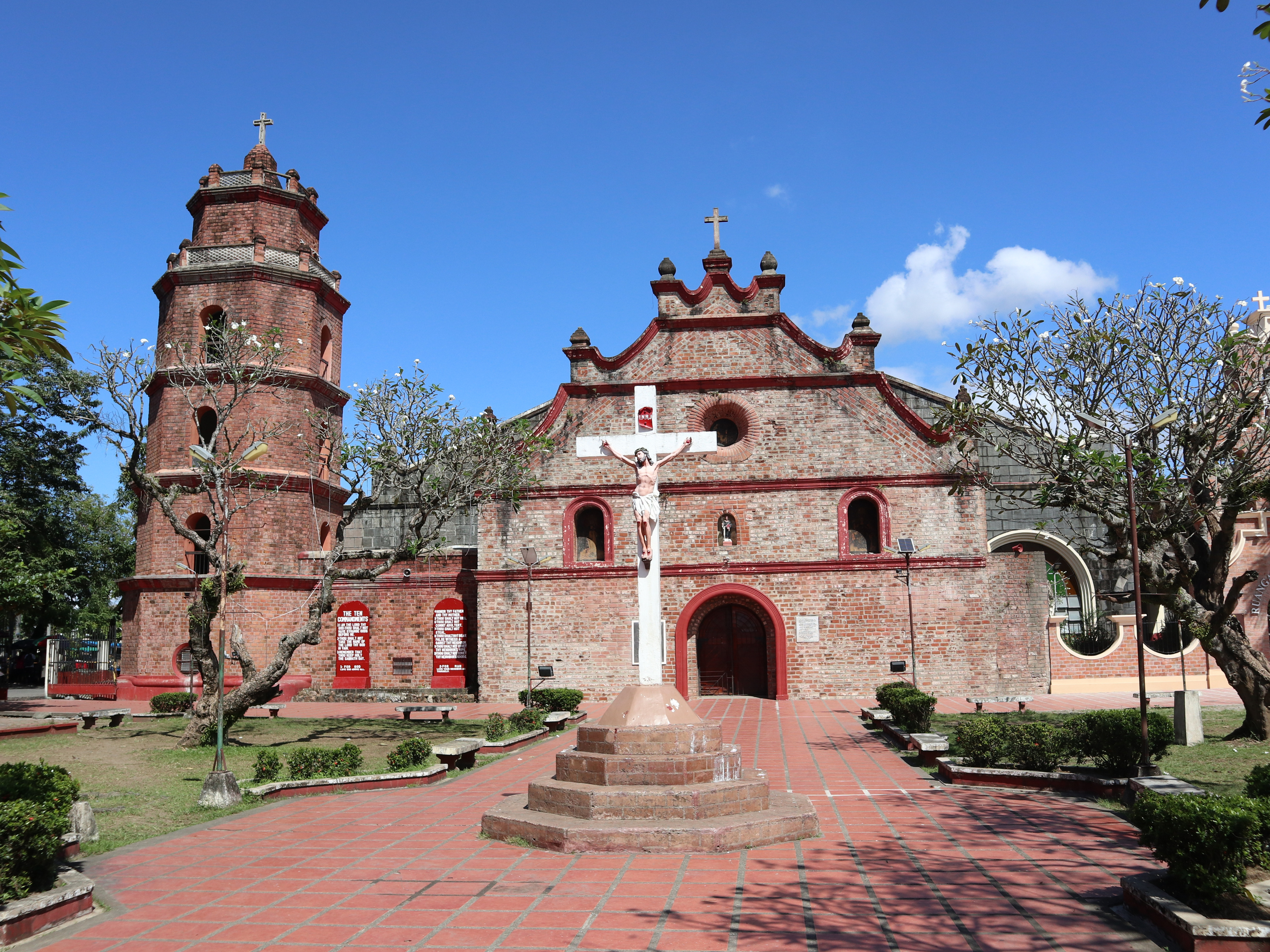
Cathedral facade in 2022)

The first Eucharistic Celebration in the church was held on April 23, 1739, with Fray Pedro Freire presiding. During that time, this cathedral was called the Church of St. Augustine. On September 8, the church was rededicated to St. Dominic de Guzman.

The mission in present-day Bayombong had its roots in the mid-18th century when it was formally accepted by the Dominicans as mission center in a region previously referred to as Paniqui. Soon after founding the mission, the erection of the church structure took place in 1780 under the supervision of Father Juan Crespo, OP. According to records, the church, and other nearby structures, was gutted by fire in 1892. Father Cerefino Martinez, O.P. initiated the reconstruction of the church. It was completed three years after, in 1895, with the installation of galvanized iron roofing, new altarpieces and a new pulpit. Another fire in 1986 and the 1990 Luzon earthquake severely damaged the church again and destroyed its bells, leaving only the façade and the bell tower as the only remaining original portions from the Spanish era.

== Architecture ==
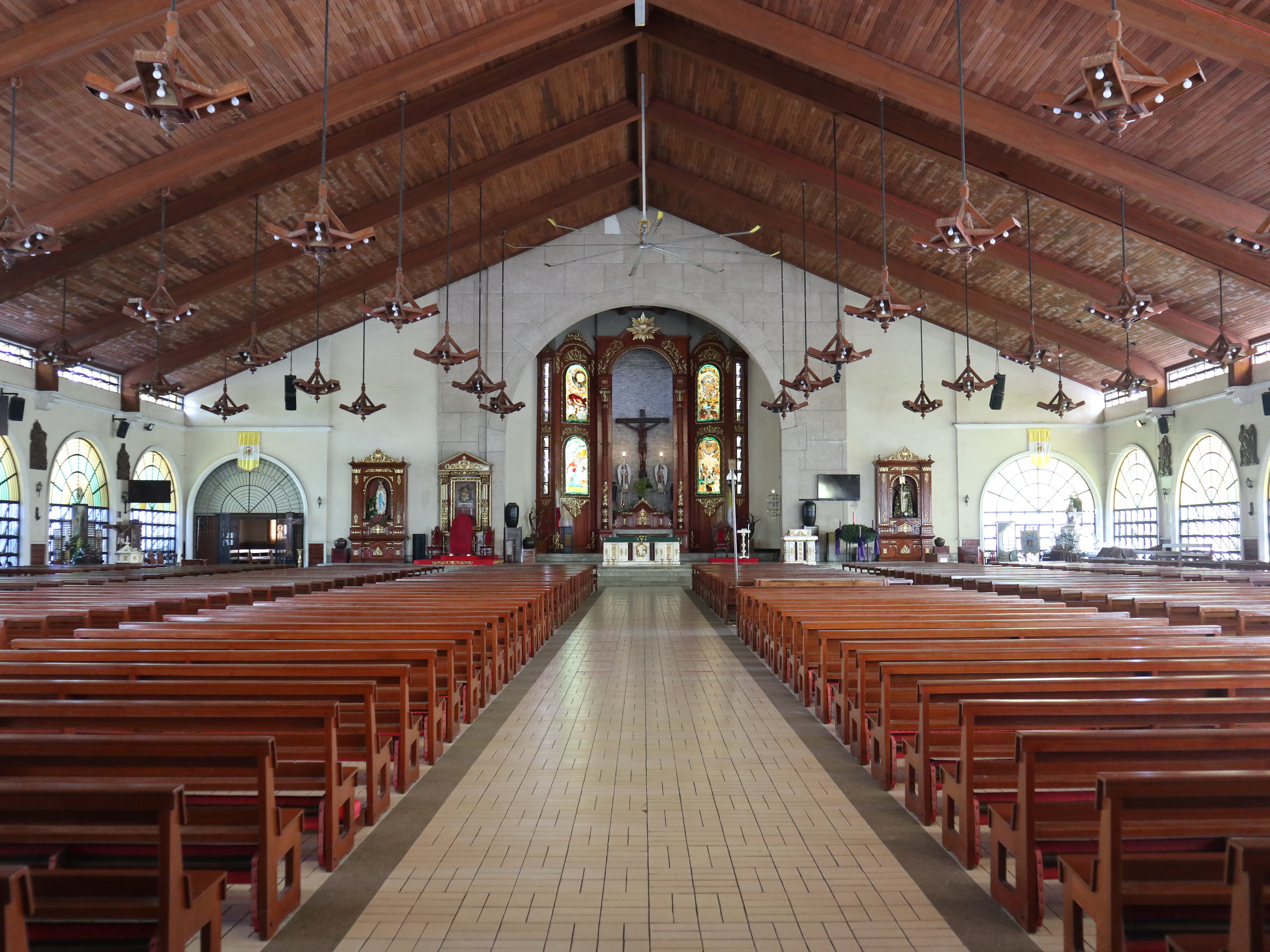
Cathedral interior in 2022

The church façade is described as a close copy of that of the San Vicente Ferrer Church in Dupax del Sur and the Santa Catalina de Siena Church in Bambang, Nueva Vizcaya, with its doors, windows and oculus, not to mention the pediment shape that's also similar to that of the older Tuguegarao Cathedral in Cagayan province. A difference, however between this church and the two above-mentioned churches is the lack of columns framing the windows. The slightly detached, octagonal campanile is also distinct to the church of Bayombong. The façade, with its squat appearance, is divided into four sections by cornices. The façade is ornamented with two windows on the second level (flanking a saint's niche) and an oculus on the third level.
