= Saint Catherine of Siena Church (Bambang) =

Roman Catholic church in Nueva Vizcaya, Philippines

Bambang Church
- Saint Catherine of Siena Parish Church
- Santa Catalina de Siena Parish Church
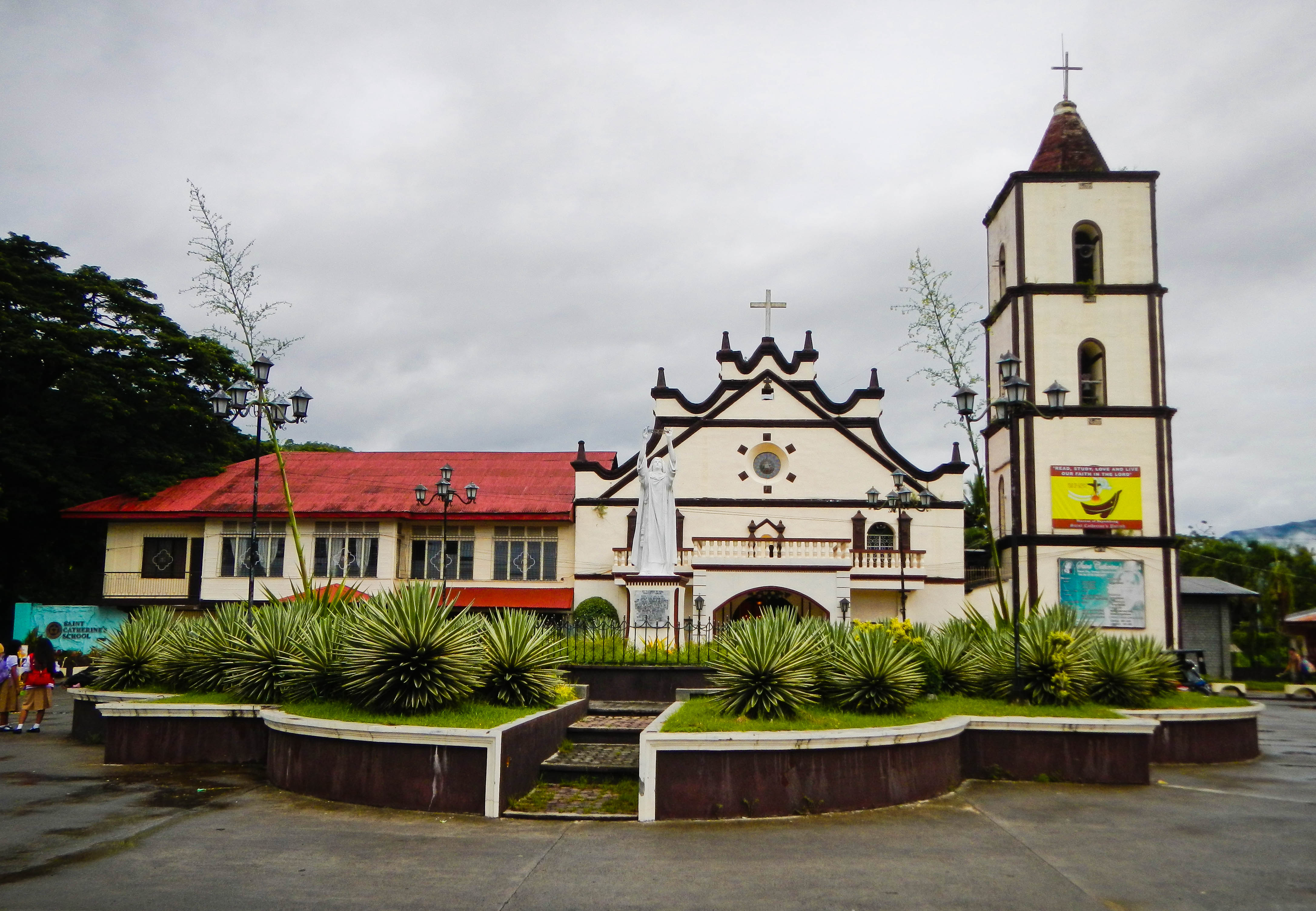
- Church façade in 2013

- Location in Luzon Location in the Philippines
- 16°23′06″N 121°06′17″E
- Location: Nueva Vizcaya
- Country: Philippines
- Denomination: Roman Catholic

History
- Status: Parish church
- Founded: 1747
- Dedication: St. Catherine of Siena

Architecture
- Functional status: Active
- Architectural type: Church building
- Style: Baroque
- Groundbreaking: 1772
- Completed: 1791

Specifications
- Materials: Brick, sand, stone, gravel, cement, steel, concrete

Administration
- Archdiocese: Tuguegarao
- Diocese: Bayombong

Clergy
- Archbishop: Most Rev. Ricardo L. Baccay, D.D.
- Bishop(s): Most Rev. Jose Elmer I. Mangalinao, D.D.

Saint Catherine of Siena Parish Church, commonly known as Bambang Church, is an 18th-century, Baroque Roman Catholic church located at Brgy. Buag, Bambang, Nueva Vizcaya, Philippines. The parish church, dedicated to Saint Catherine of Siena, is under the jurisdiction of the Diocese of Bayombong.

== History ==
Christianity had its origins in Bambang when the Dominicans, led by Father Tomas Gutierrez, established the mission called Ytuy in 1609 to convert and serve the local tribe called Isinay. The present-day towns of Bambang, Bayombong, Aritao, and Kayapa comprised the said mission. Bambang, then called San Bernardo, was officially created as a town on July 5, 1747. The Dominicans established their convent in Bambang in 1751 with Father Cristobal Rodriguez as its first vicar. Years later, the construction of the present church started. In 1772, the construction of the church commenced under Father Domingo Caro, OP. The church was completed before the turn of the century, in 1791. The remains of a certain Rosa de Santa Maria is recorded to have been interred in the church, under one of the side altarpieces dedicated to Our Lady of the Most Holy Rosary. Rosa de Santa Maria, an Isinay woman, is one of the two native Filipina "flowers of sanctity". She was known as Doña Maria de Luta, the wife of Nicolas Dalimang Calderon, an Isinay Governadorcillo of Bambang.

== Architecture ==
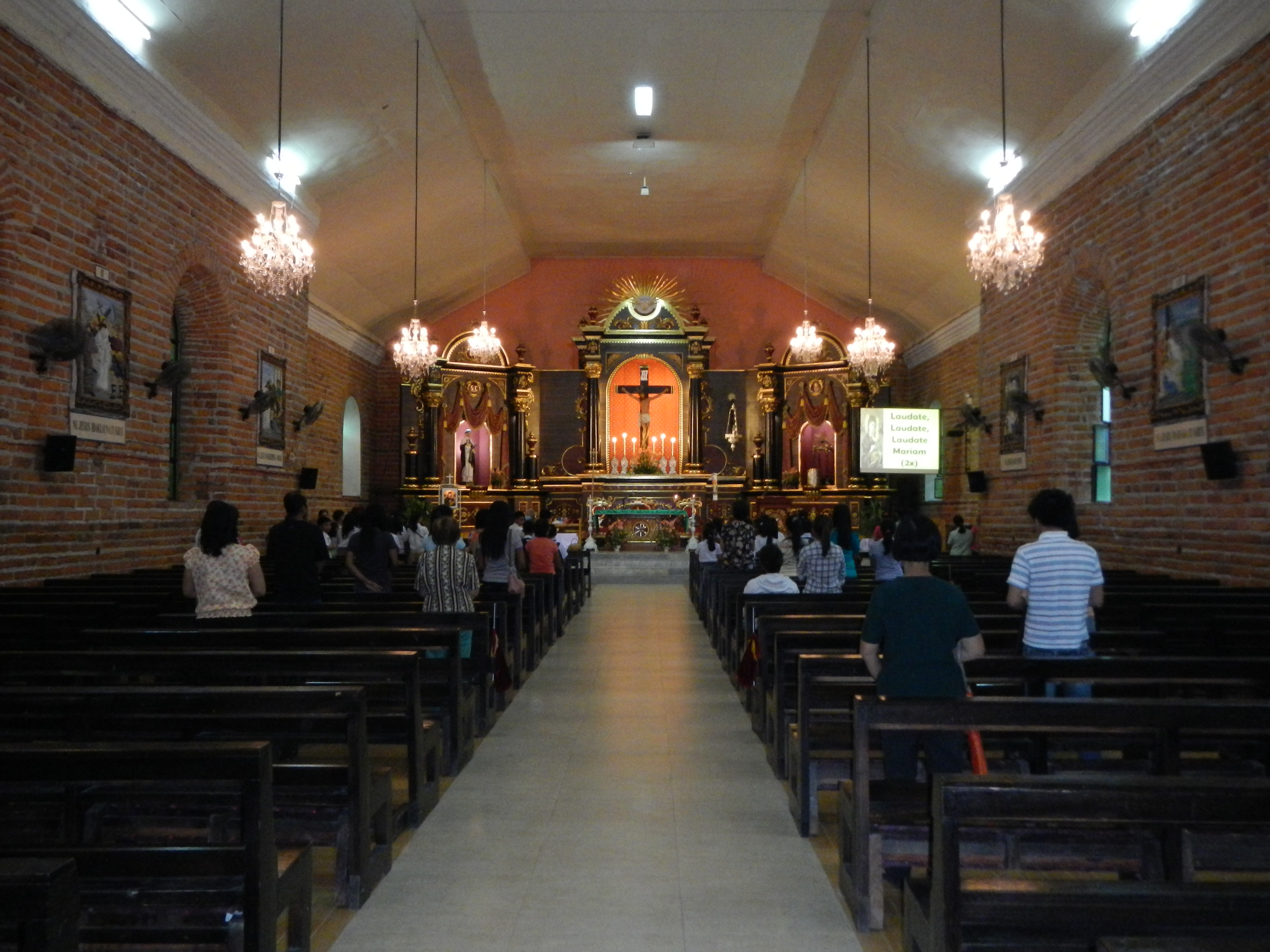
Church interior in 2013

The church façade has been described as "nearly identical" to the façade of the Dupax del Sur Church, save for a few differences with regards to its details such as the absence of the blind windows on the first level, a slightly steeper pediment, and the presence of clay insets adorning oculus on the third level. A concrete canopy covering the main portal is a later addition into the structure. The four level bell tower is also very similar to that of the Dupax del Sur Church except for the plainer, plastered look and more pronounced cornices marking the boundaries of each level. Clay insets bearing the years 1775 and 1779 suggests the dates when the belfry level was completed.
