= Didipio mine =

Mine in Nueva Vizcaya, Philippines

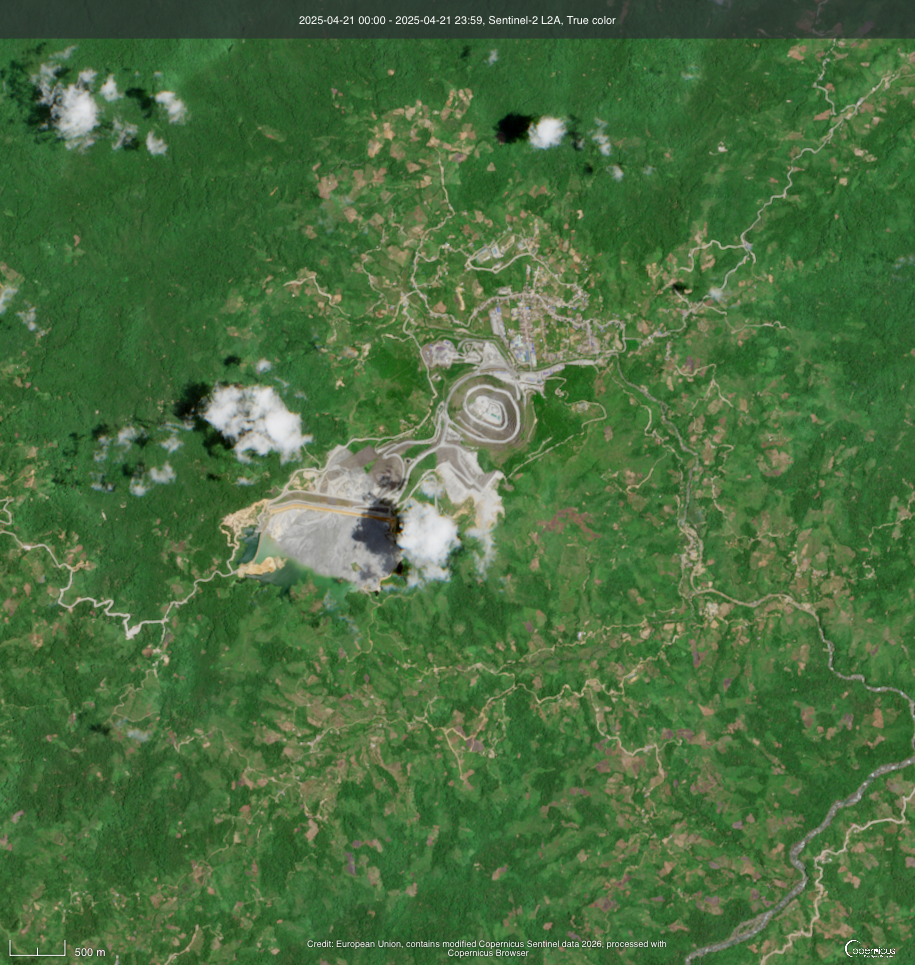
- Didipio mine from space taken by Sentinel-2

- Location within Luzon Location within Philippines

Location
- Location: Barangay Didipio, Kasibu, Nueva Vizcaya, Philippines; 16°19′29″N 121°27′01″E

Production
- Products: Copper, Gold
- Production: Gold: 138,500 ounces (3,930 kg); Copper: 14,200 metric tons (31,300,000 lb)
- Financial year: 2023
- Type: Open-pit and underground mine

History
- Opened: 1994

Owner
- Company: OceanaGold
- Website: https://didipiomine.com.ph

Didipio mine is a large open-pit and underground gold and copper mine located at Kasibu, Nueva Vizcaya, Philippines. The mine is operated by the OceanaGold.

== History ==
The mine was permitted to operate for 25 years under a Financial or Technical Assistance Agreement (FTAA) with the government in June 1994. The permit was renewed on 2019 for another 25 years, the operation was halted for two years after disputes with the local government but later resumed its operation in July 2021.

== Operation ==
Didipio mine is operated by OceanaGold Philippines Inc., a subsidiary of OceanaGold. The mine is both an open-pit mine and an underground mine. In 2023, the mine produces 14,200 metric tons (31,300,000 lb) of copper and 138,500 ounces (3,930 kg) of gold.

== Criticism ==
Various indigenous (Bugkalot, Tuwali), environmentalist and religious (CBCP) groups has demanded to cancel the mining permit of the mine due to environmental concern and alleged human rights issues.

In 2007 and 2008, the mine was ordered closed by then-governor Luisa Cuaresma, leading to charges being filed against her and other officials of the Nueva Vizcaya provincial government. In 2019, the mine's operation was again halted by governor Carlos Padilla even after the approval of the Department of Environment and Natural Resources.

In July 2021, the Legal Rights and Natural Resources Center (LRC) and other environmentalist groups denounced the renewal of the mine's operations citing that "[it] flies in the face of the will of the local government and groups of Tuwali indigenous people.” and adding that it disrupts agricultural livelihoods, and contributing to the air and water pollution to area.

== See also ==
- Dupax del Norte anti-mining protests
