= Saint Vincent Ferrer Church (Dupax del Sur) =

Roman Catholic church in Nueva Vizcaya, Philippines

Dupax del Sur Church
- Saint Vincent Ferrer Parish Church
- Iglesia Parroquial de San Vicente Ferrer (Spanish); Simbahan ng Parokya ni San Vicente Ferrer (Filipino)
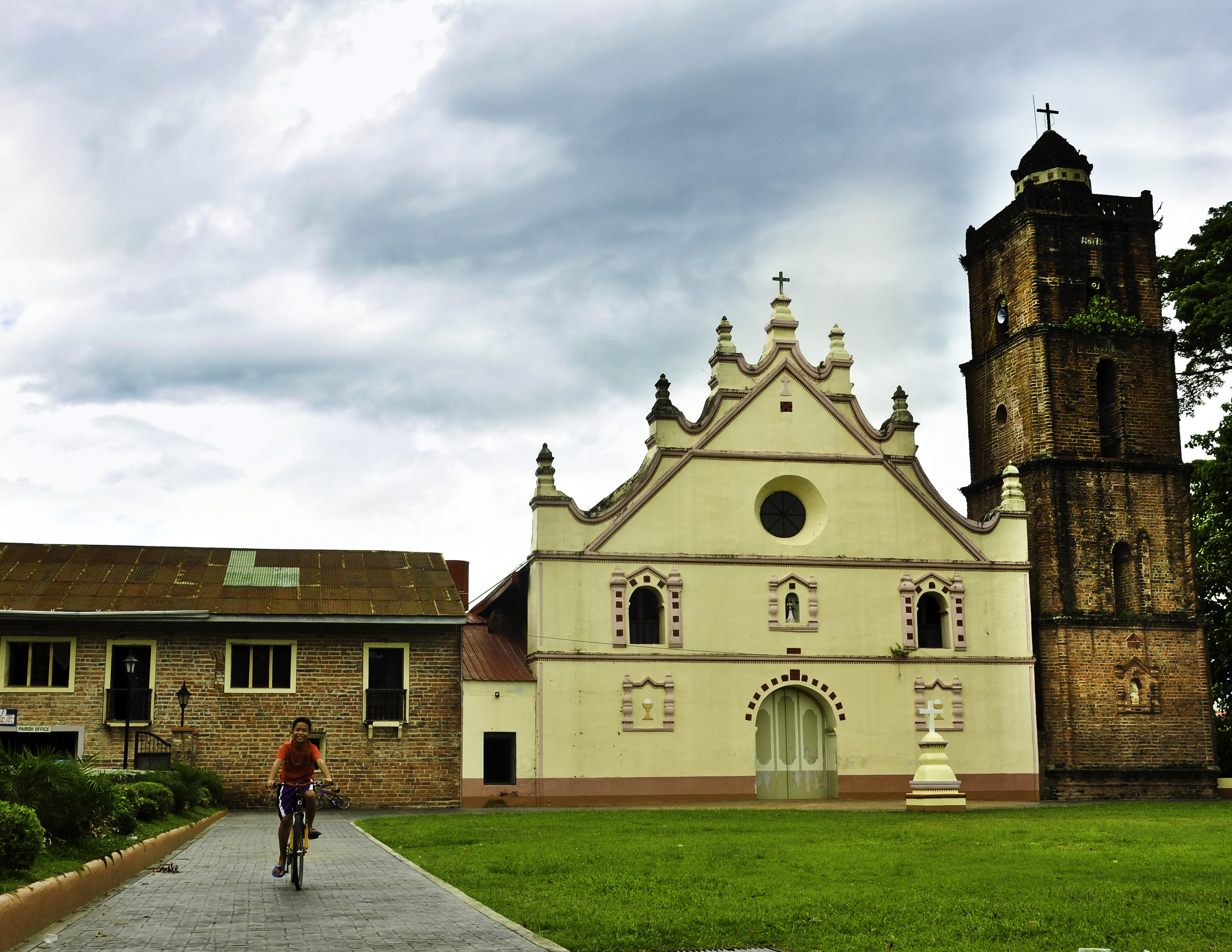
- Church façade in 2013

- Location in Luzon Location in the Philippines
- 16°17′06″N 121°05′29″E
- Location: Aritao-Quirino Road, Barangay Dopaj, Dupax del Sur
- Country: Philippines
- Denomination: Roman Catholic

History
- Status: Parish church
- Dedication: Saint Vincent Ferrer

Architecture
- Functional status: Active
- Heritage designation: National Cultural treasure
- Designated: 2001
- Architect(s): Father Manuel Corripio, OP
- Architectural type: Church building
- Style: Baroque
- Completed: 1776

Specifications
- Materials: Brick, sand, gravel, cement, steel

Administration
- Archdiocese: Tuguegarao
- Diocese: Bayombong

Clergy
- Archbishop: Most Rev. Ricardo L. Baccay, D.D.
- Bishop(s): Most Rev. Jose Elmer I. Mangalinao, D.D.

Saint Vincent Ferrer Parish Church, commonly known as Dupax Church or Dupax del Sur Church, is an 18th-century Baroque Roman Catholic church located at Brgy. Dopaj, Dupax del Sur, Nueva Vizcaya, Philippines. The parish church, under the advocation of Saint Vincent Ferrer, is under the jurisdiction of the Diocese of Bayombong. The church complex has been declared a National Cultural Treasure by the National Museum of the Philippines in July 2001.

== History ==
Dupax started as a mission by the Dominican Priests to convert the native group called Isinays into Christianity at around 1602. The Dominicans pushed through with the evangelization of the region until 1704 when the missions were turned over to the Augustinians because of lack of personnel. By 1740, the said missions in present-day Nueva Vizcaya were returned to the administration of the Dominicans.

== Architecture and design ==
=== Architectural history ===
An earlier church structure of modest design might have been erected before 1773 and records tell that the structure may have been reused as a schoolhouse after the erection of the present church at around 1773 by Father Manuel Corripio, OP. By this time, the church of Tuguegarao by Father Antonio Lobato, OP was already standing. Like the earlier Tuguegarao church, Father Corripio had the church of Dupax made of bricks and even had two kilns made near the church complex, one for firing bricks and the other for preparing lime. The current façade, which mimics the silhouette of the earlier Tuguegarao Cathedral and is reflected on the churches of Bayombong and Bambang in Nueva Vizcaya, dates back to 1776 while each level of the bell tower bears inscription of the years when which it must have been completed. Its original titular patron is the Nuestra Señora del Socorro but was replaced by San Vicente Ferrer soon after the mission was returned to the Dominicans.

The church was severely damaged during the 1990 Luzon earthquake, during which the apex crucifix of the church was toppled and a pair of columns adorned by stucco carvings was also damaged. The church was restored in 1996 following a joint effort by the National Museum of the Philippines, the National Commission for Culture and the Arts, and the US State Department.

=== Exterior ===
The façade is described as a reflection of that of Tuguegarao Cathedral, only less in ornamentation and lower in height. Unlike the church of Tuguegarao, the church of Dupax has no spiral columns and pilasters that offer support to the structure. The façade is divided by cornices into horizontal segments of plastered brick. The first level features a semicircular arched main portal embellished with clay insets. The main doorway is flanked on both sides by two blind windows with an embossed image of the Holy Eucharist. The second story features a niche and two windows framed by embossed carvings. The triangular pediment is divided into two horizontal sections with the lower half pierced with a deeply recessed oculus and the upper part featuring a relief of a cross. The entire pediment is capped by undulating cornices and seven finials, with the central finial crowned with a cross.

To the left of the façade is the four-level, unplastered, rectangular bell tower. The base features saint's niches similar to that found on the second level of the façade while the second level features long, narrow windows framed with bracket columns. The tower is capped with a decorative parapet and a small cupola surmounted by a cross. The church plaza is enclosed by a low perimeter wall and a replica of an earlier atrial cross.

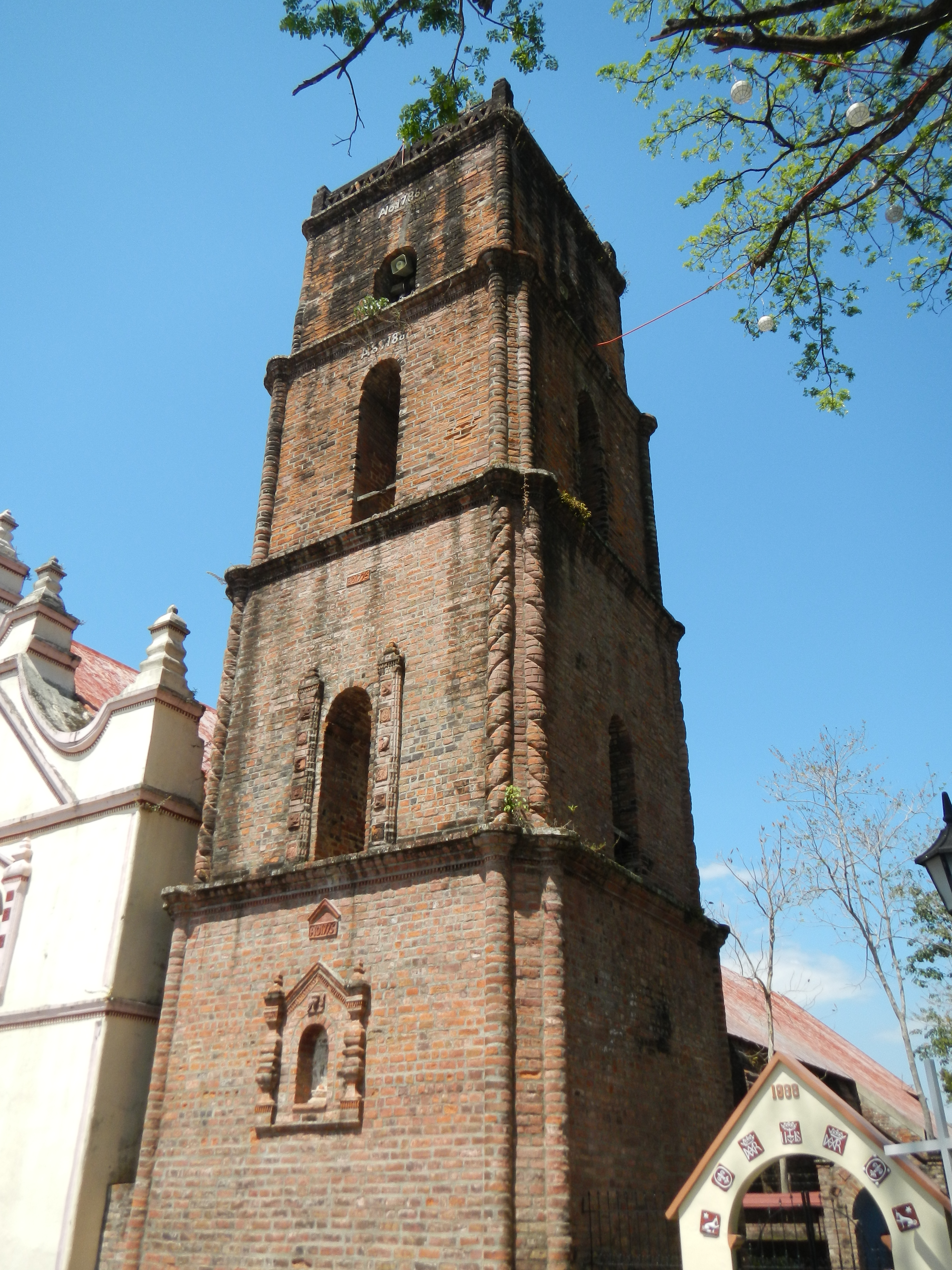
Belfry

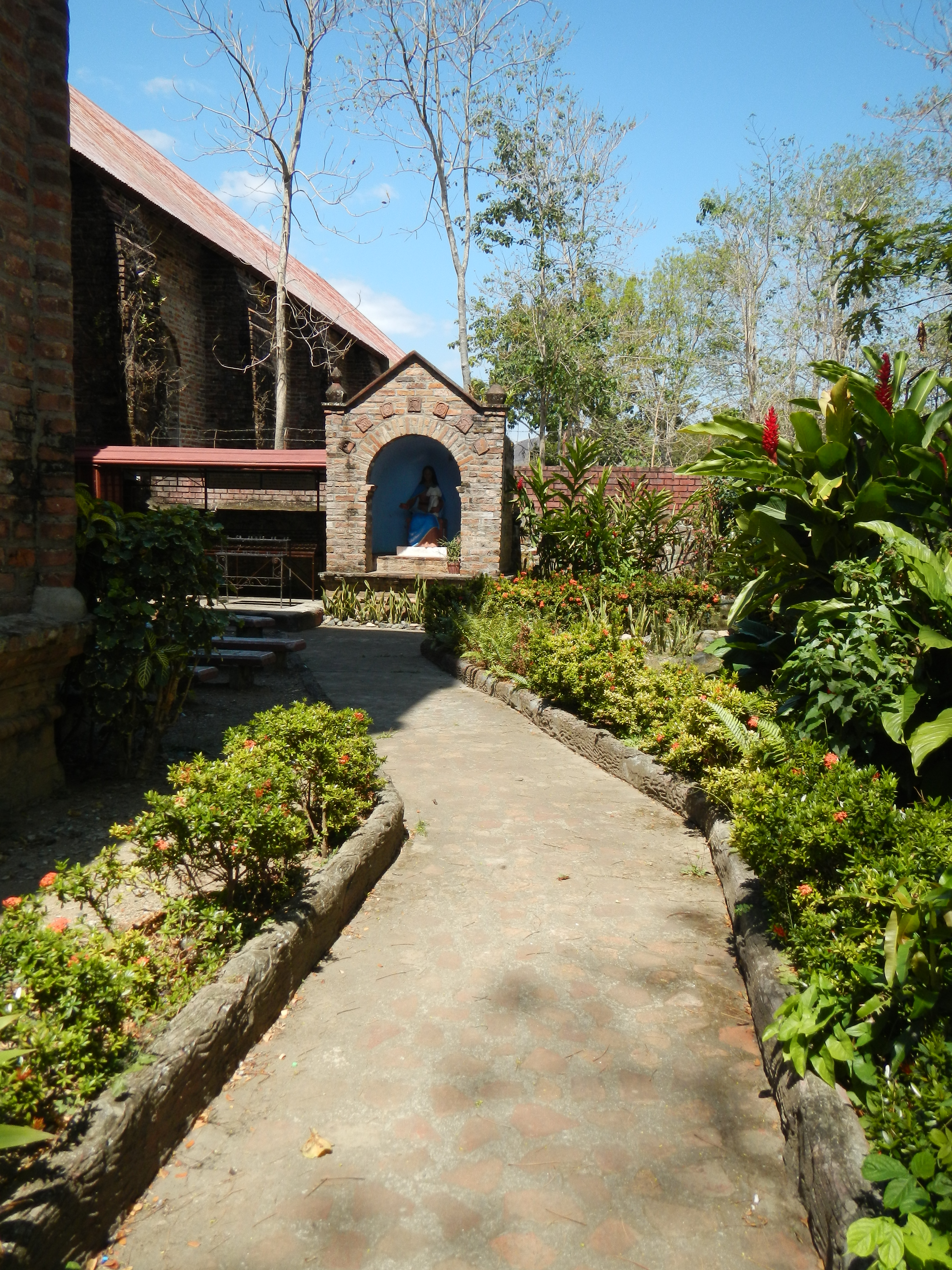
Side gate

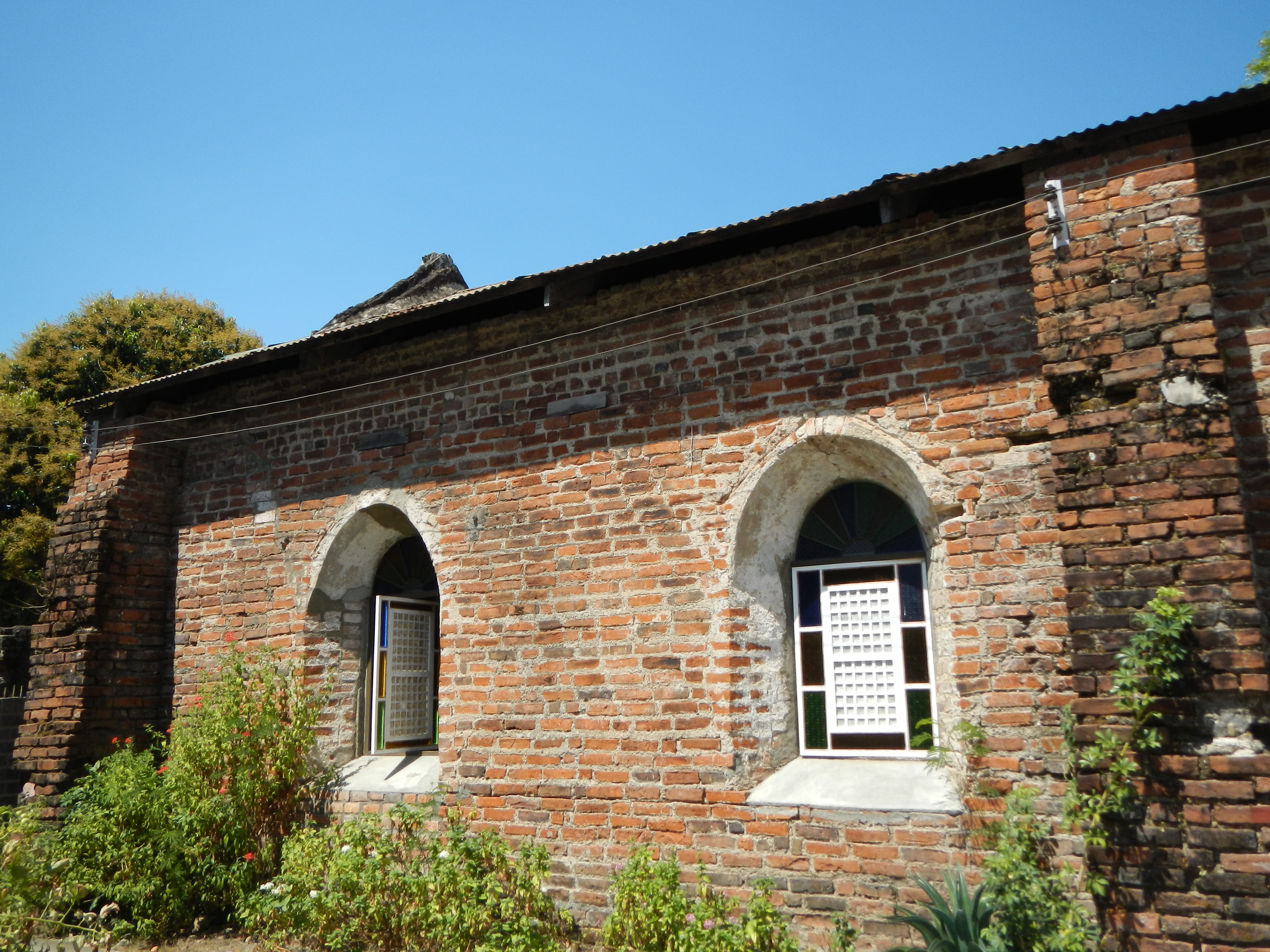
Side wall

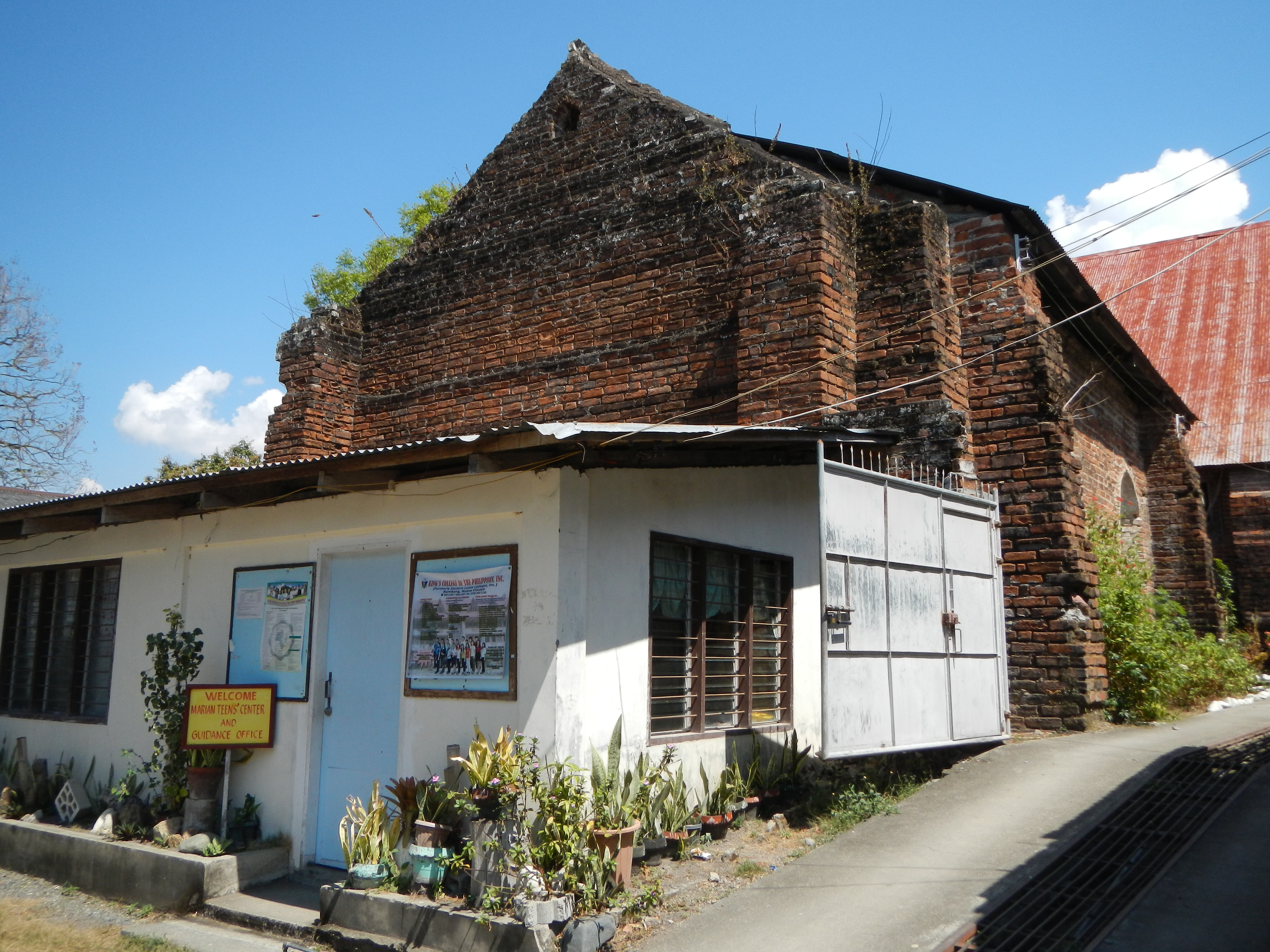
Back wall

=== Interior ===
Two focal points inside the church are the pillars supporting the choir loft. The two, white-washed pillars are embellished with reliefs of cherubs, shells, florals and arabesques. Similar motifs can also be found on the baptistery. The original main altarpiece and pulpit are still intact but the heads of the images in the altarpiece are believed to be replicas of the ivory ones stolen over the course of the church's history.

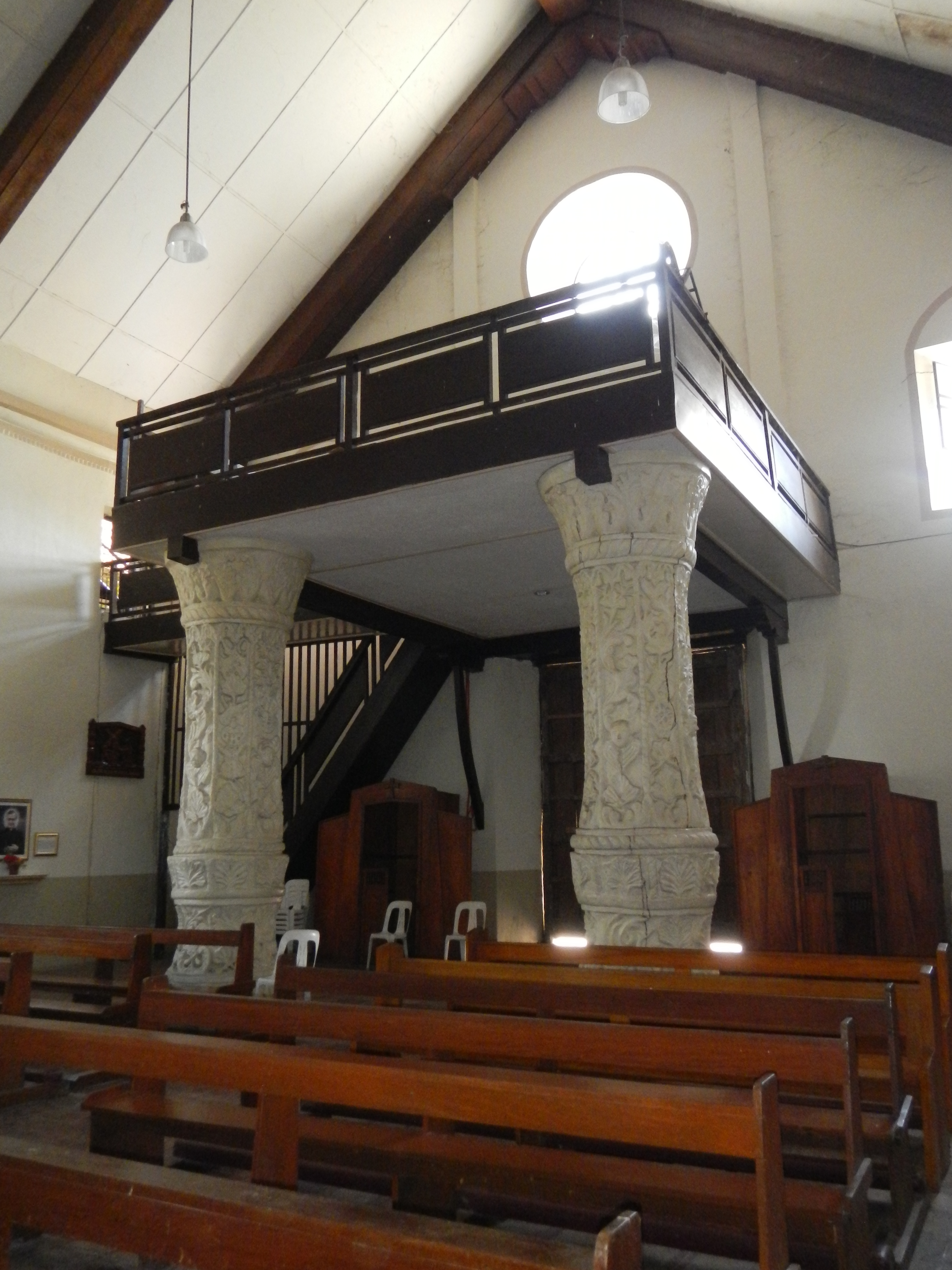
Loft with ornate columns

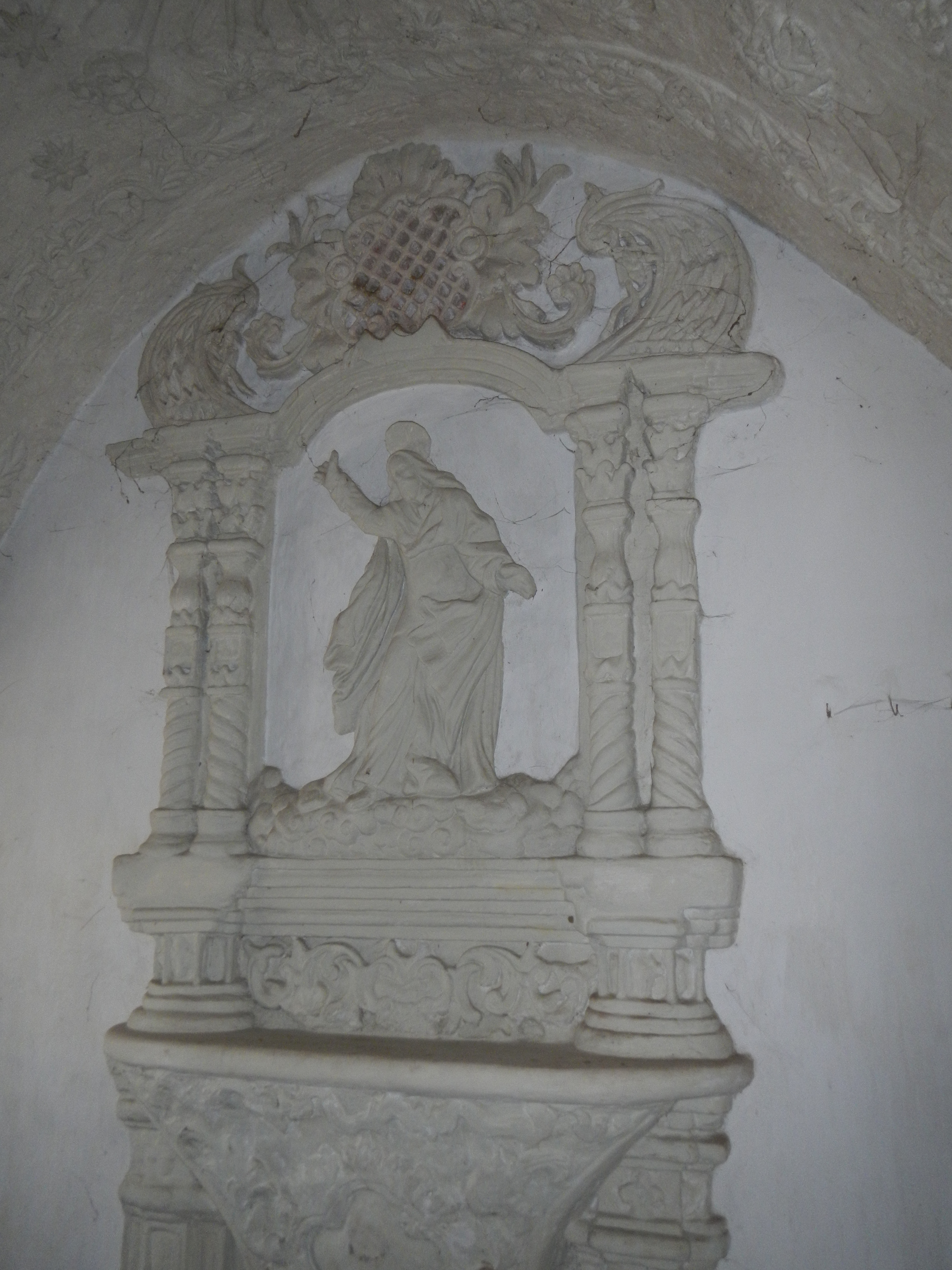
Relief found in the baptistery

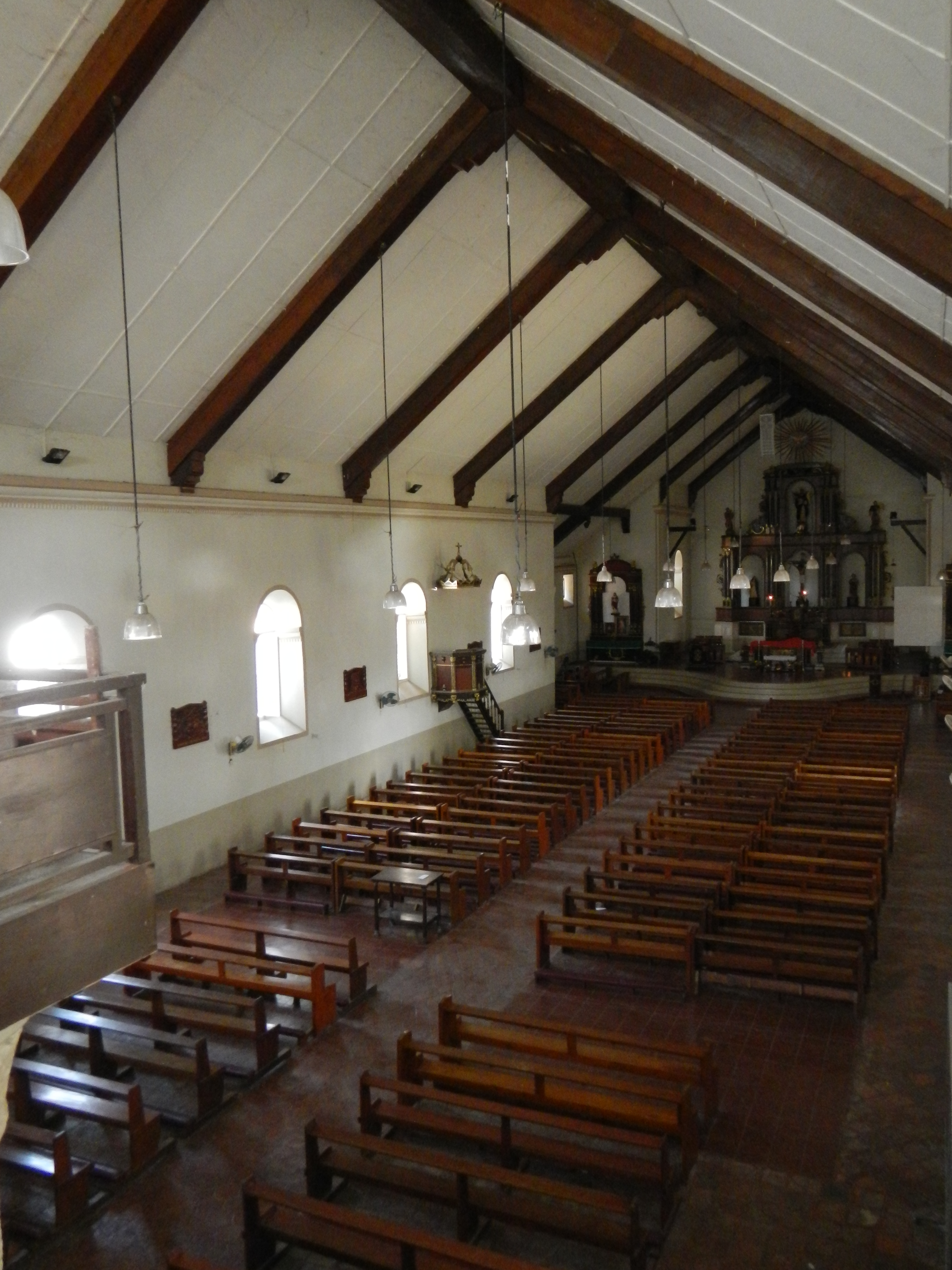
Main nave as seen from choir loft in 2014

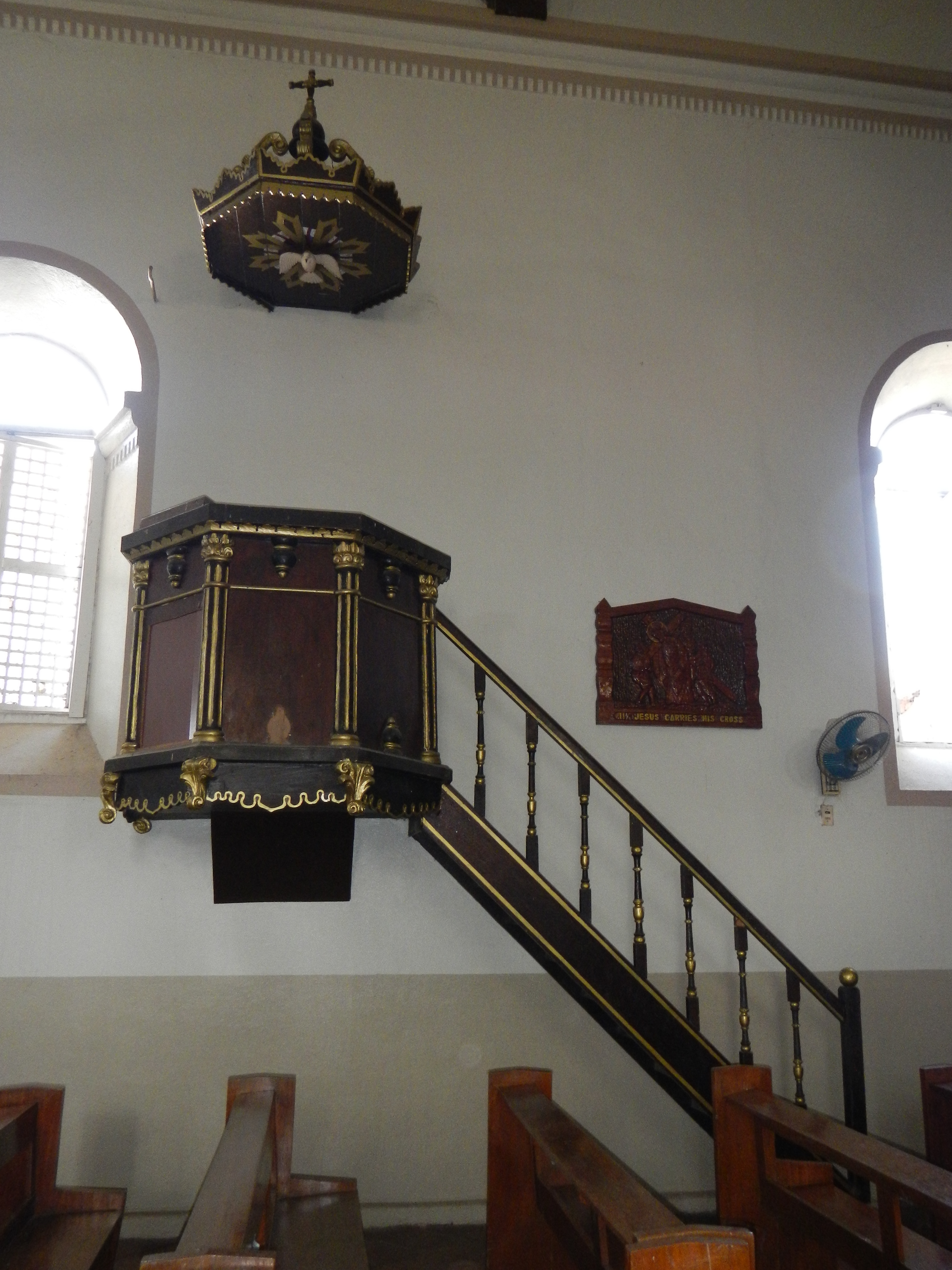
Pulpit

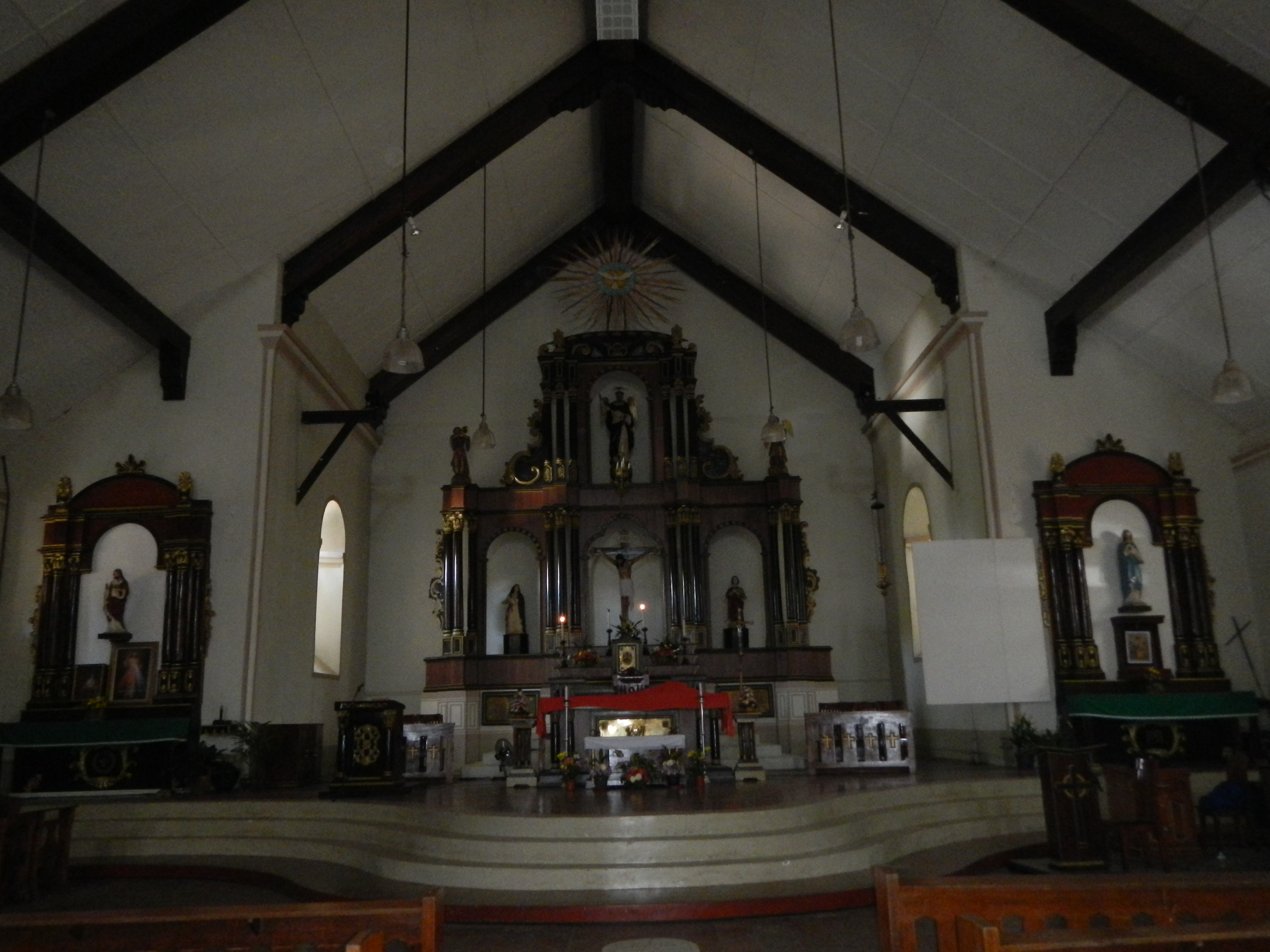
Altar pieces
