= Vizcaya Hymn =

Provincial anthem of Nueva Vizcaya

- Provincial anthem of Nueva Vizcaya
- Lyrics: Jaime M. Macadangdang (original English lyrics)
- Music: Jaime M. Macadangdang
- Adopted: 2012

The "Vizcaya Hymn" is the official anthem of the province of Nueva Vizcaya in the Philippines.

== History ==
The Vizcaya Hymn was composed by Jaime M. Macadangdang, a retired teacher from Solano, who also wrote the song's original English lyrics.

In 2012, the Nueva Vizcaya Provincial Board passed Ordinance No. 2012-081, adopting new, official Ilocano lyrics for the song, with Macadangdang's lyrics being translated into Ilocano by Bernabe D. Lorenzo, Jr. Intended to make the song more relatable to the province's residents, the provincial government subsequently ordered all employees of the province's subordinate local government units to sing the song in Ilocano, and the ordinance made mandatory the song's performance at official events and public functions throughout the province.

The Sangguniang Panlalawigan later passed Ordinance No. 2019–160 on June 17, 2019 which adopts an official flag for Nueva Vizcaya, with the playing of the Vizcaya Hymn becoming part of the observed flag protocol whenever it is raised.

The Isinai and Gaddang versions of the hymn are yet to be fulfilled.

== Lyrics ==
Although the Vizcaya Hymn only has official lyrics in English and Ilocano, indigenous peoples living in the province have also translated the lyrics into their own respective languages as well as Tagalog.

Original English version
penned by Jaime M. Macadangdang
Official Ilocano version
translated by Bernabe D. Lorenzo, Jr.

In a valley where there's peace and happiness
Where people praise the country's noble sires
Lie the rolling plains and hills so blest
There everyone enjoys the toilers’ share
Behold the fields with all the golden grains
The teeming trees crowning the Sierra Range
Winding Magat and Salinas Spring
That is our Vizcaya home

𝄆 We sons and daughters of Vizcaya
Shall forever be noble and free
Dedicate our lives for Vizcaya
Loyal we shall ever be
We love thy banner, O Vizcaya
We give thee, all our heart and hands
Altogether we sing the splendor of our land
Of our beloved Vizcaya 𝄇

Ginget nga ayan ti talna ken ragsak
Ken amma nag intantan-ok annak
Patad turod a namayengmeng
Mangted rag-o, gaget ti agtaeng
Bimmalitok taytay-ak makita
Namsek a kaykayo't bantay Sierra
Ayos ti Magat, ubbog Salinas
O Vizcaya nga imnas

𝄆 Dakam an-anak mu Vizcaya
Sitatakneng, siwaya-waya
Biag idaton mi kenka Vizcaya
Sipupudno kam kenka
Tawagayway mo oh Vizcaya
Itag-ay mi awan duwa-duwa
Dayag mu ti inkam tu la ikankanta
Dungdungwen mi a Vizcaya 𝄇

The song's lyrics make reference to the natural beauty of the province, its rich natural resources, and the need to love, encourage and promote the province's cultural traditions.
