= Jose Elmer Mangalinao =

Filipino bishop of the Catholic Church (born 1960)

His Excellency, The Most Reverend Jose Elmer Imas Mangalinao D.D.
- Bishop of Bayombong
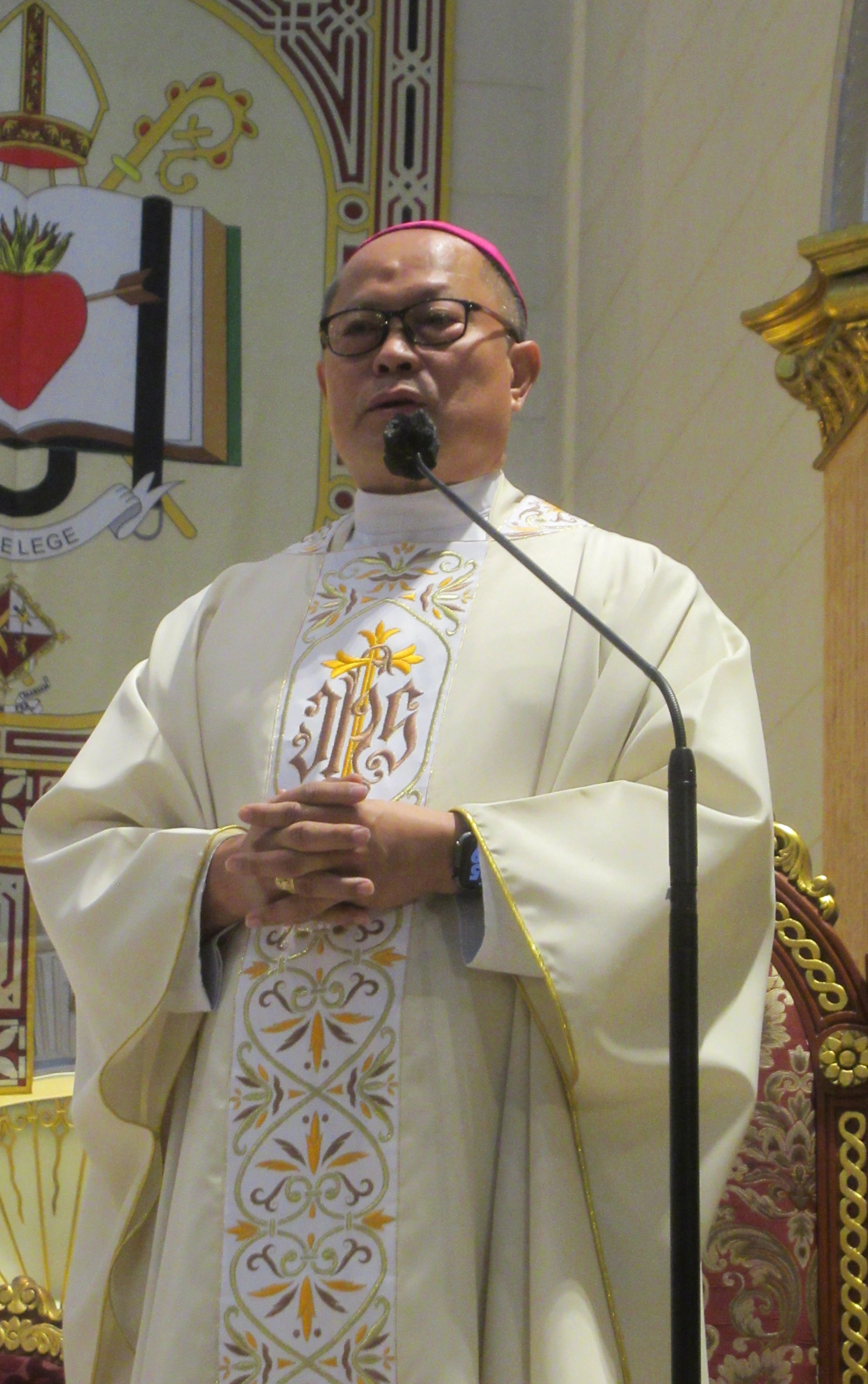
- Bishop Jose Elmer Mangalinao (August 2024, Baliwag Church)
- Province: Tuguegarao
- See: Bayombong
- Appointed: May 24, 2018
- Installed: July 25, 2018
- Predecessor: Ramon Barrera Villena
- Previous posts: Chairman, CBCP Episcopal Commission on Catechesis and Catholic Education (2021–2023); Auxiliary Bishop of Lingayen-Dagupan (2016–2018); Titular Bishop of Urusi (2016–2018)

Orders
- Ordination: October 15, 1985
- Consecration: August 22, 2016 by Socrates Villegas

Personal details
- Born: April 7, 1960 (age 66) Cabiao, Nueva Ecija
- Motto: Laetitia in Domino (Joy in the Lord)
- Coat of arms

Styles of Jose Elmer Imas Mangalinao
- Reference style: The Most Reverend
- Spoken style: Your Excellency
- Religious style: Bishop

Jose Elmer Imas Mangalinao (born April 7, 1960) is a Filipino bishop of the Catholic Church. He is the third and current Bishop of Bayombong since 2018.

== Biography ==
Mangalinao was born in Cabiao, Nueva Ecija on April 7, 1960. He studied theology at the San Carlos Seminary in Makati; among his classmates were Archbishops Socrates Villegas and Florentino Lavarias. He was ordained as a priest for the Diocese of Cabanatuan on October 15, 1985. He served as spiritual director at the Maria Assumpta Seminary in Cabanatuan and was concurrent Parish Priest at the Saint Isidore the Worker Parish in Talavera until 1993. In 1995, he obtained a licentiate in Theology from the Pontifical Gregorian University after two years studying in Rome.

After returning to the Philippines, he served as Parish Priest in Gapan and became Vicar General and member of the College of Consultors in 2006. He became Parish Priest of Cabanatuan Cathedral from 2008 to 2014. In 2014, he was also appointed as President of the College of the Immaculate Conception in Cabanatuan. In 2016 he was consecrated as Titular Bishop of Urusi and Auxiliary Bishop in the Roman Catholic Archdiocese of Lingayen–Dagupan.

On May 24, 2018, he was appointed by Pope Francis to become Bishop of Bayombong. He was a former chairman of the Catholic Bishops Conference of the Philippines-Episcopal Commission on Catechesis and Catholic Education.

== Activism ==
On April 22, 2024, he led the Diocese and other environmental groups in filing a legal petition calling for the closure of the OceanaGold mining concession in Kasibu, Nueva Vizcaya, which was also supported by the provincial government and other organizations.

== Health ==
In September 2022, Mangalinao successfully underwent coronary angioplasty in a Los Angeles hospital after a myocardial infarction. In February 2023, he also underwent a quintuple heart-bypass surgery at the Cardinal Santos Medical Center in San Juan, Metro Manila.

Catholic Church titles
Preceded by Ramon Villena	Bishop of Bayombong; July 25, 2018 – present	Incumbent
Preceded by Julian Porteous	— TITULAR — Bishop of Urusi; August 22, 2016 – May 24, 2018	Succeeded by Aquilino Bocos Merino
