= Diocese of Bayombong =

Latin Catholic diocese in the Philippines

Coordinates: 16.4838°N 121.151°E

Diocese of Bayombong Dioecesis Bayombongensis Diyosesis ng Bayombong Diocesis ti Bayombong Diócesis de Bayombong

Catholic
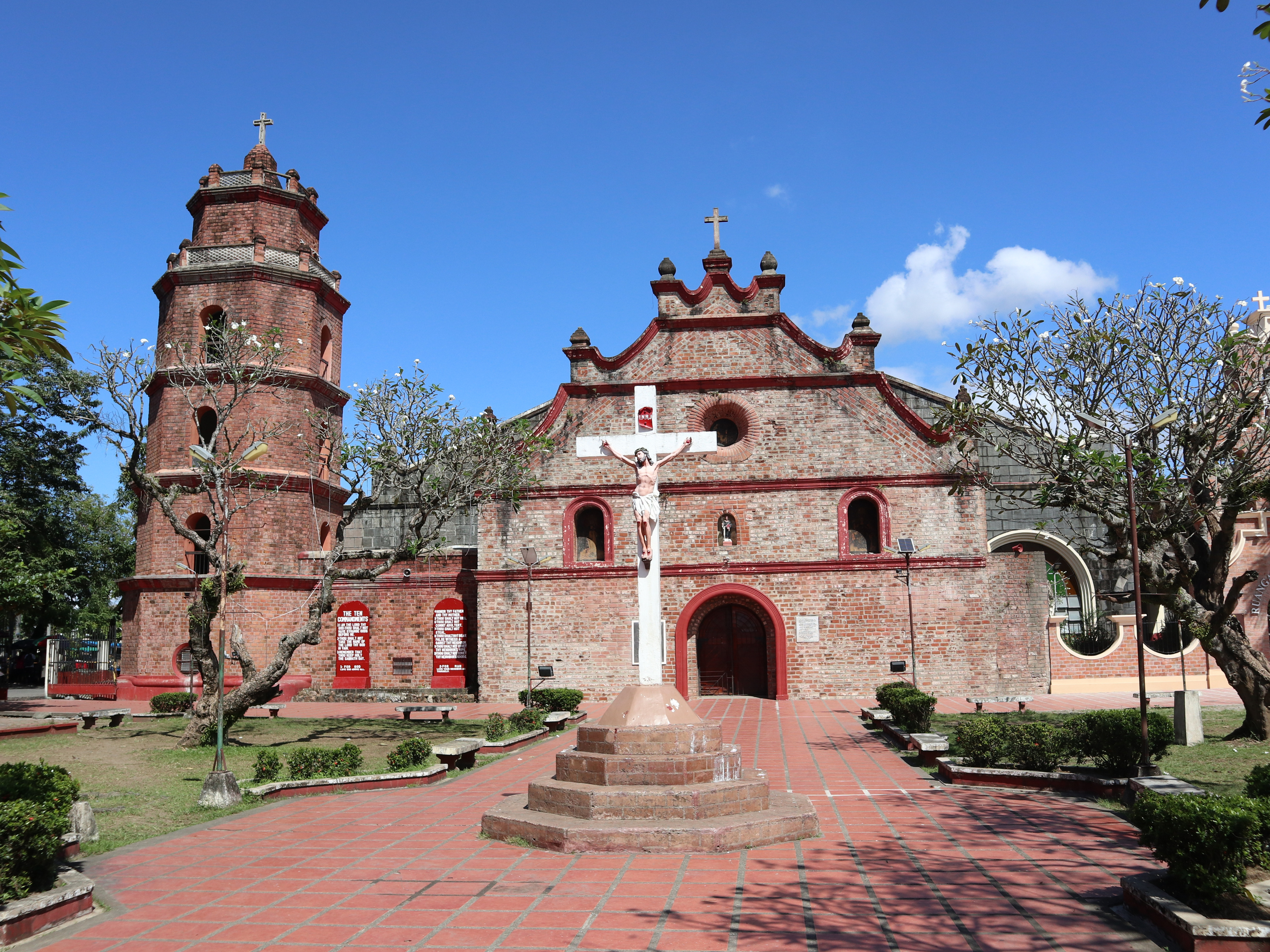
- Bayombong Cathedral

- Coat of arms

Location
- Country: Philippines
- Territory: Nueva Vizcaya; Quirino
- Ecclesiastical province: Tuguegarao

Statistics
- Area: 6,961 km^{2} (2,688 sq mi)
- Population: Total; Catholics: (as of 2021); 1,165,000; 654,000 (56.1%)
- Parishes: 20

Information
- Denomination: Catholic Church
- Sui iuris church: Latin Church
- Rite: Roman Rite
- Cathedral: Cathedral-Parish of St. Dominic of Guzman
- Patron saint: Dominic of Guzman; Vincent Ferrer (secondary)
- Secular priests: 27

Current leadership
- Pope: Leo XIV
- Bishop: Jose Elmer Mangalinao
- Metropolitan Archbishop: Ricardo Baccay
- Bishops emeritus: Ramon Villena

The Diocese of Bayombong (Lat: Dioecesis Bayombongensis; formerly known as Praelatura Territorialis Bayombongensis) is a Latin Church ecclesiastical jurisdiction or diocese of the Catholic Church in the Philippines. Its cathedra is in Bayombong Cathedral, in the episcopal see of Bayombong.

== History ==
Erected on November 7, 1966, through the apostolic constitution Patris Instar as the Territorial Prelature of Bayombong, the said prelature was elevated to a diocese in November 1982 by Pope John Paul II through apostolic constitution Cum Decessores Nostri Romani Pontifices. The diocese is a suffragan of the Archdiocese of Tuguegarao.

After the resignation of Bishop Ramon Villena in 2016, Pope Francis appointed Sofronio Aguirre Bancud, SSS, DD, Bishop of Cabanatuan as Apostolic Administrator. On May 24, 2018, the Pope appointed Jose Elmer I. Mangalinao, DD, Auxiliary Bishop of Lingayen-Dagupan, as the third Bishop of the Diocese of Bayombong.

Former coat of arms of the Territorial Prelature of Bayombong used until 1986.

== Ordinaries ==
No.	Name	From	Until	Coat of Arms
1	Albert Van Overbeke, CICM, D.D.	November 18, 1966	September 15, 1986	
2	Ramon B. Villena, D.D.	September 15, 1986	May 28, 2016	
Sede Vacante - Apostolic Administrator	Sofronio Aguirre Bancud	May 28, 2016	July 25, 2018	
3	Jose Elmer I. Mangalinao, SThL, D.D.	May 24, 2018	Incumbent	

== See also ==
- Catholic Church in the Philippines
- List of Catholic dioceses in the Philippines
