= List of schools in Dipolog =

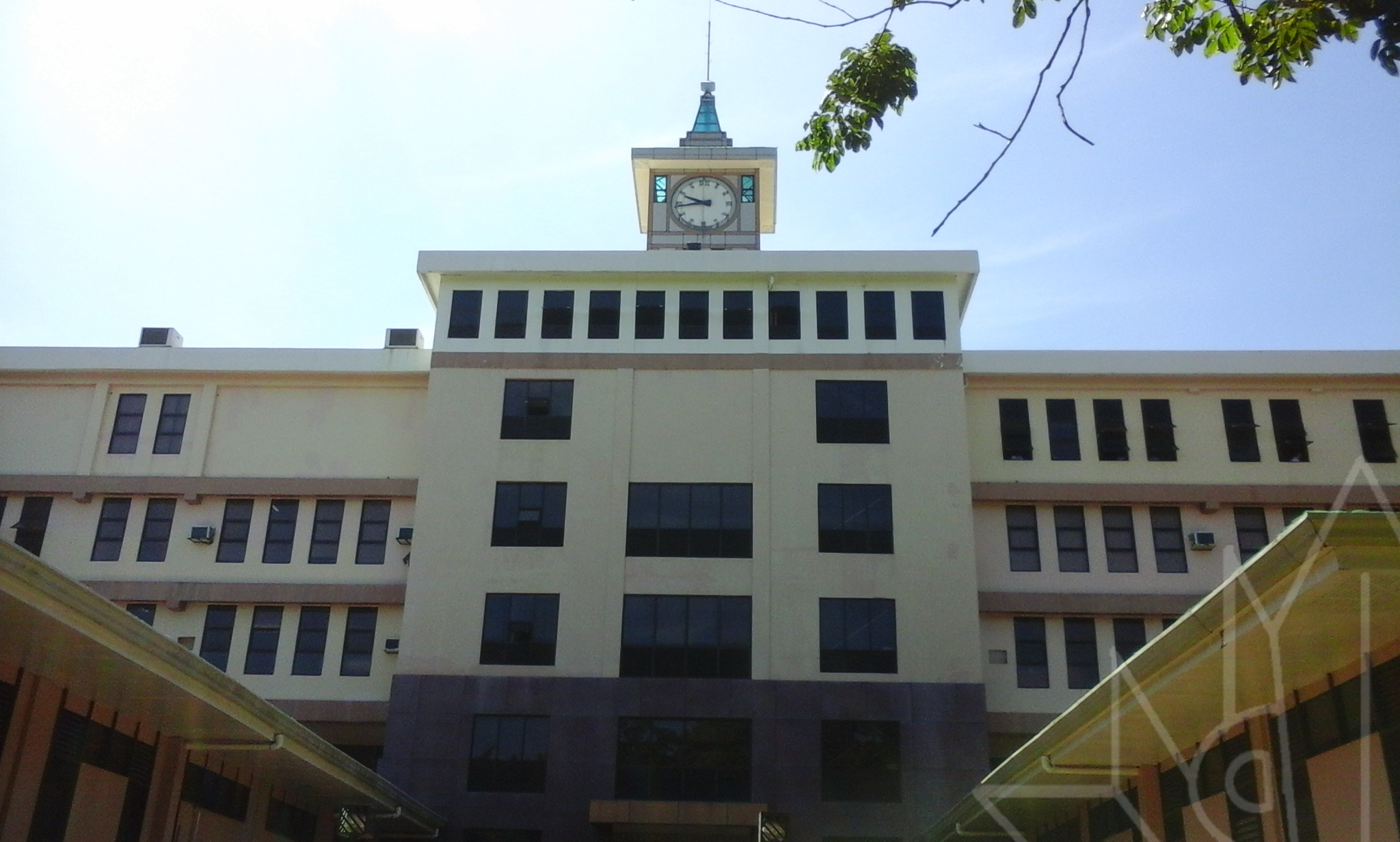
Andres Bonifacio College

Dipolog is the capital of Province of Zamboanga del Norte, Philippines. This article lists those schools, colleges and universities.

== Universities ==
Name	Location	Date Established
Jose Rizal Memorial State University - Dipolog Campus (JRMSU-Dipolog)	Rotonda, Turno	November 20, 1961 as ZNSAT

== Colleges ==
Name	Location	Date Established
Andres Bonifacio College (ABCollege)	College Park, Miputak	1940
Saint Vincent's College, Inc. (SVCI)	Padre Ramon Street, Estaka	June 17, 1917
Dipolog Medical Center College Foundation, Inc. (DMCCFI)	Fr. N. Patangan Road, Santa Filomena	August 1, 1974
Dipolog City Institute of Technology (DCIT)	National Highway, Minaog	1986

=== Former colleges ===
- STI College Dipolog, Miputak (ceased operations in 2020)

== Private elementary & high schools ==
Name	Location	Pre-School	Grade School	High School
Saint Mary's Academy of Dipolog	Padre Ramon Street, Central	√	√	√
Dipolog Community School, Inc.	Lorenzo Garden Ville, Upper Turno	√	√	√
Global Springs of Learning Academy	Upper Turno	√	√	√
Metro Dipolog Baptist Academy	Purok Sidlakan, Upper Turno		√	√
DMC College Foundation ~ Basic Education	Fr. N. Patangan Road, Santa Filomena	√	√	
DMC Science High School	Fr. N. Patangan Road, Santa Filomena			√
Andres Bonifacio College (Basic Education)	College Park, Miputak	√	√	√
Saint Vincent's College Basic Education Campus	Padre Ramon Street cor. Capitol Avenue, Estaka		√	√

== Public schools ==
The DepEd-Dipolog Schools Division has 4 districts namely: North District, South District, East District and West District. The city's DepEd Division office is beside Olingan Elementary School at Olingan Central Road in Purok Farmers, Barangay Olingan.

=== Elementary schools ===
Name	Location	Year Established
NORTH DISTRICT
Dipolog Pilot Demonstration School	Rizal Avenue, Central	1923
Dipolog Special Education (SPED) Center	DPDS, Rizal Avenue, Central	2000
Barra Elementary School	Lopez Jaena Street, Barra	1964
Biasong Elementary School	Biasong	2002
Sicayab Elementary School	Sicayab Circumferential Road, Sicayab	1949
SOUTH DISTRICT
Laoy Olingan Elementary School	Purok De Oro, Olingan	1980
Olingan Elementary School	Olingan Central Road, Purok Farmers, Olingan	
Olingan South Elementary School	National Highway, Olingan	1999
Sta. Cruz Elementary School	Pastor Bajamunde Road, Relocation Site, Olingan	2002
Punta Central School	National Highway, Punta	1941
San Alfonso Elementary School	Sangkol	1975
San Jose Elementary School	San Jose	1938
Cayasan Integrated School	Cayasan, Diwan	1970
Cogon Elementary School	National Highway, Cogon	1955
Diwan Elementary School	Diwan	1945
Guinsangaan Elementary School	Guinsangaan, Diwan	1994
Kepiyanan Elementary School	Pangyan, Diwan	2016
Linay Elementary School	Linay, Diwan	1994
Pamansalan Elementary School	Diwan	1968
Sangkol Elementary School (Juan Butler L. James Memorial School)	National Highway, Sangkol	1938
Virginia Elementary School	Virginia, Diwan	
EAST DISTRICT
Estaka Central School	ZNCEC Complex, Estaka	1939
Dicayas Elementary School	Lower Dicayas	2000
Linabo Elementary School	3,003 Steps to Linabo Peak, Lugdungan	1977
Lugdungan Elementary School	Lugdungan	1940
Minaog Elementary School	Minaog	1930
St. John Elementary School	Relocation Site, Dicayas	1998
Sto. Niño Elementary School	Minaog	1998
Turno Elementary School	Lower Turno	1968
WEST DISTRICT
Magsaysay Elementary School	Ramos Village, Santa Filomena	
Miputak East Central School	Quezon Avenue, Miputak	1928
Sta. Isabel Elementary School	Santa Isabel	2002
Galas Elementary School	Anahaw Road, Galas	1959

=== High schools ===
Name	Location	Year Established
SPECIALIZED HIGH SCHOOL
Philippine Science High School Zamboanga Peninsula Region Campus*	National Highway, Cogon	2015
NORTH DISTRICT
Dipolog City National High School	Felipe Lacaya Street Extension, Barra	2000
Sicayab National High School	Purok San Roque, Sicayab	1995
SOUTH DISTRICT
Alberto Q. Ubay Memorial Agro-Tech Science High School	Fisheries Road, Purok Parpagayo, Olingan	2001
Punta National High School	Punta	1968
Cogon National High School	Cogon	1963
Pamansalan Eco-Tech School	Pamansalan, Diwan	1994
EAST DISTRICT
Zamboanga del Norte National High School	Cirilo Sorronda Road, Estaka	1946
Zamboanga del Norte National High School - Turno**	Lower Turno	2023
WEST DISTRICT
Miputak National High School***	Jacobo Amatong Street, Miputak	2019
Galas National High School	National Highway, Galas	1982
*Operating in affiliation with the Department of Science and Technology. **Formerly a part of, and independent from the main Zamboanga del Norte National High School. ***Formerly Mipuak West Central School and Zamboanga del Norte National High School - Miputak Campus.

=== Integrated schools ===
Name	Location	Year Established
SOUTH DISTRICT
Sinaman Integrated School	National Highway, Sinaman	1955
EAST DISTRICT
Gulayon Integrated School	National Highway, Gulayon	1939, 2001
Upper Dicayas Integrated School	Puting Bato Road, Upper Dicayas	2005
WEST DISTRICT
Sta. Filomena Integrated School	Pablo Canturias Road, Santa Filomena	1961
Tubod Integrated School	Eugenio R. Margate Road, Tubod, Galas	1975

== Vocational and Technical Schools ==
- Deuel Technical Institute
- Dipolog School of Fisheries
- Livelihood Skills Development and Enhancement Center
- ZN Agri-Technical Institute, Inc.

=== Former schools ===
- Ben Villarino Vocational School, Inc. (ceased operations as of 2024)
- Dipolog Computer Systems, Inc. (ceased operations in 2021)
