= Philippine Science High School System =

Specialized public high school system in the Philippines

- Sistema ng Mataas na Paaralan ng Pilipinas sa Agham

Information
- Type: Public specialized high school system
- Established: June 22, 1963 (first campus); February 12, 1998 (as the PSHSS)
- Executive Director: Ronnalee Orteza
- Grades: 7 to 12
- Enrollment: 8,358 (school year 2018-2019)
- Language: English, Filipino (for Filipino subject only)
- Campus: 16 campuses (see below)
- Colors: Blue and White
- Affiliation: Department of Science and Technology
- Website: www.pshs.edu.ph

The Philippine Science High School System (Filipino: Sistema ng Mataas na Paaralan ng Pilipinas sa Agham), colloquially known as 'Pisay' or 'PhilSci', is a research-oriented and specialized public high school system in the Philippines that operates as an attached agency of the Philippine Department of Science and Technology.

The first school which later became the system's main campus was established in Quezon City on June 22, 1963, and began admitting students the following year. The system itself was institutionalized on February 12, 1998. It currently has 16 campuses across the Philippines.

== History ==
=== First campus ===
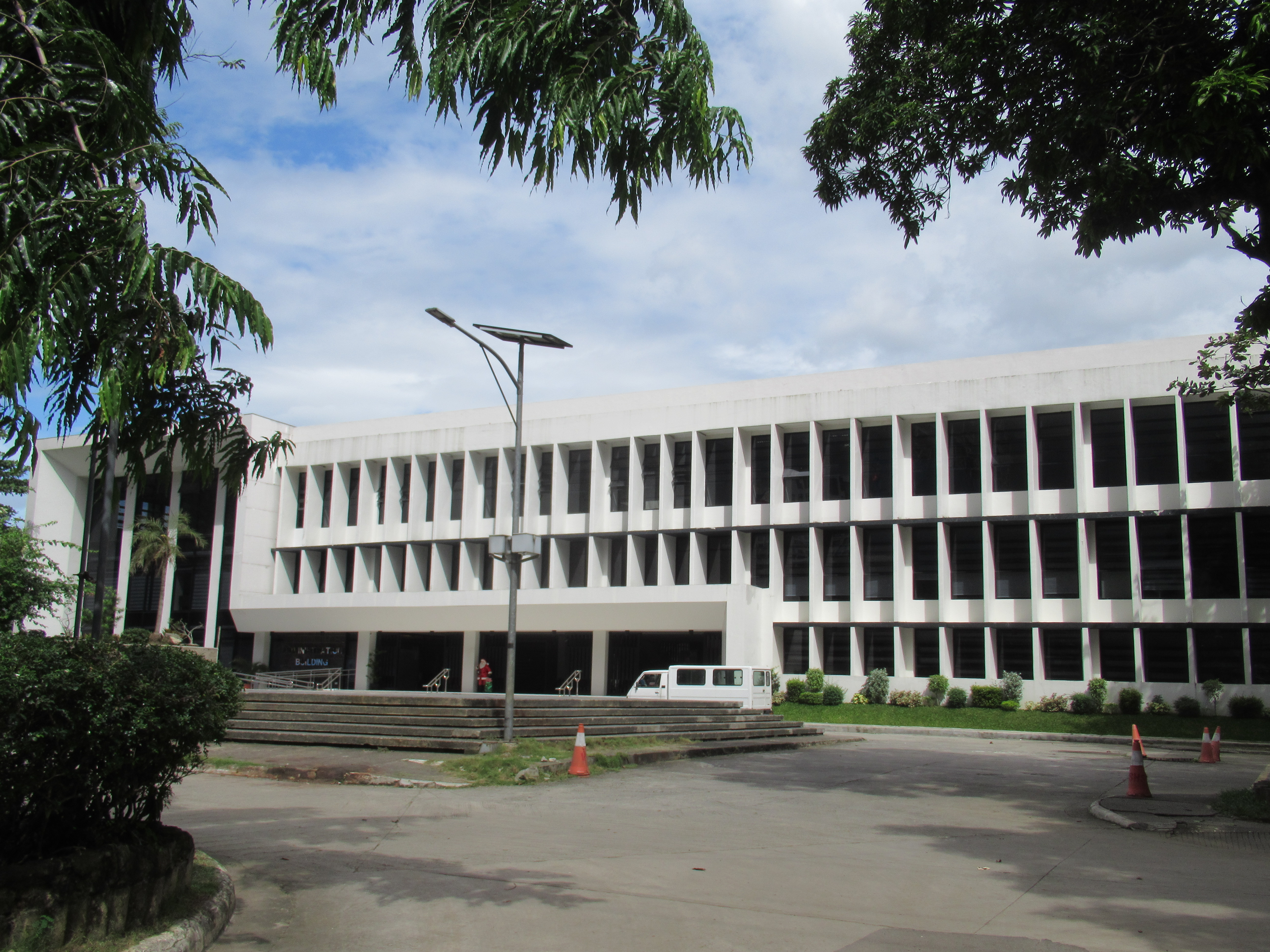
The main campus in Diliman, Quezon City which has been operational since 1973.

The Philippine Science High School (PSHS) was established via Republic Act (RA) No. 3661, which was authored by Congressman Virgilio Afable and signed into law by President Diosdado Macapagal on June 22, 1963. It mandates the creation of a school which provides scholarship to students with an emphasis on mathematics and sciences to prepare them to take on scientific careers.

It is the implementation of a proposal of Leopoldo V. Torralba, a mathematics professor at the New York University who envisioned that type of school for Filipinos patterned after the Bronx High School of Science.

PSHS first opened on September 5, 1964, using rented buildings alongside the Elliptical Road in Quezon City.

In 1966, the PSHS requested the government a land of its own leading to the construction a campus from 1970 to 1972 in Diliman. The Diliman campus opened in 1973.

=== Expansion and establishment of the PSHS System ===
Three more campuses was built across the Philippines namely the Eastern Visayas, Western Visayas, and Southern Mindanao (now Davao Region) campuses.

The Philippine Science High School System was formalized on February 12, 1998, via RA No. 8496 which became law during President Fidel Ramos's administration. This legislation placed the four existing campuses under a single system of governance and management.

RA 9036 passed on March 12, 2001, during President Gloria Macapagal Arroyo's administration mandated the establishment of at least one PSHS campus per region.

The PSHS in the 2010s transitioned into the K-12 education system which added two years to its existing four-year curriculum.

On October 3, 2025, President Bongbong Marcos signed into law RA No. 12310 or the Expanded Philippine Science High School System Act, allowing for the creation of more than one PSHS campus in the same region albeit in a different province.

Following the passing of RA No. 12310, various PSHS campuses all throughout October 2025, renamed their campuses to more specific versions to accommodate the future possibilities of multiple campuses in their regions.

== Campuses ==
=== By region ===
==== Luzon ====
===== Main (Metro Manila) =====
The Philippine Science High School - Main Campus (PSHS–MC) is the flagship campus of the Philippine Science High School System located in Diliman, Quezon City. The campus situated within the Metro Manila (National Capital Region) was established on June 22, 1963.

===== Ilocos =====
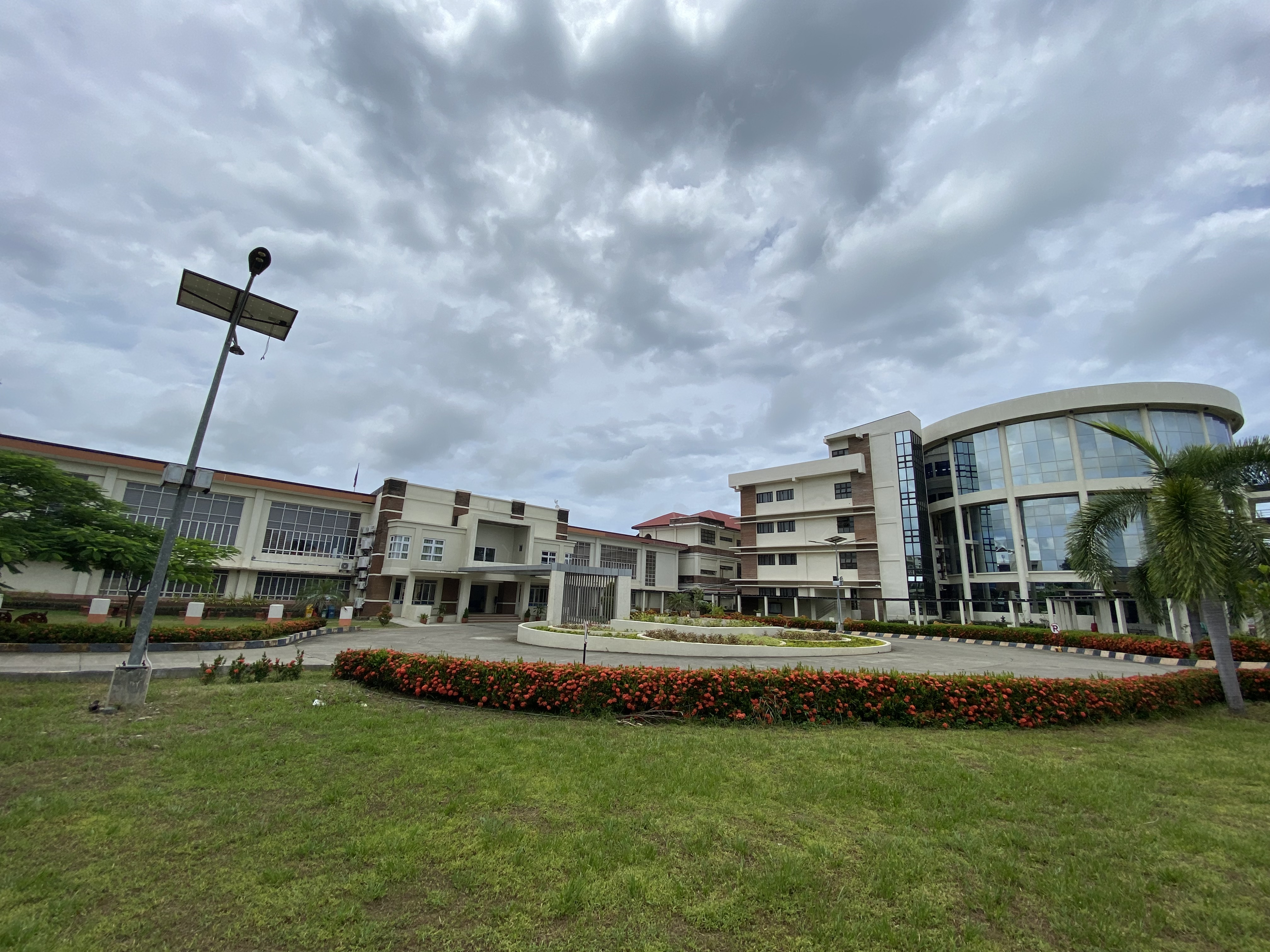
Ilocos Region Campus

The Philippine Science High School - Ilocos Region Campus in Ilocos Sur is the PSHSS Ilocos Region campus situated in San Ildefonso, Ilocos Sur. The establishment of the school was initiated by House of Representatives member Salacnib Baterina. Republic Act 9036 explicitly states San Ildefonso, Ilocos Sur as a site for consideration for a PSHS campus in Ilocos Region The PSHS Board of Trustees approved the creation of the Ilocos Region Campus on February 6, 2002, with the school opening on July 14, 2003.

The Expanded PSHS System Act or Republic Act No. 12310 proposed the establishment of a second Ilocos campus in Laoag.

===== Cagayan Valley =====
The Philippine Science High School - Cagayan Valley Campus in Nueva Vizcaya (PSHS-CVC) is the PSHSS Cagayan Valley campus situated in Bayombong, Nueva Vizcaya.

PSHS–CVC was established as the Nueva Vizcaya Science High School (NVSHS) from Republic Act 7622 in 1992, passed by then-Congressman Carlos Padilla. The school which opened in 1996 used to be situated in the same compound as the Nueva Vizcaya State University. In 1997, the control of the NVSHS was transferred to the Department of Science and Technology under Republic Act 8364.

In 2001, the NVSHS was made a PSHS campus and was then named the Cagayan Valley Campus by virtue of RA 9036. In 2002, under Governor Rodolfo Q. Agbayani, construction of a new compound for the PSHS–CVC started Barangay Masoc in Bayombong. In 2010, the PSHS–CVC had completed its relocation onto the new site.

The Expanded PSHS System Act or Republic Act No. 12310 proposed the establishment of a second Cagayan Valley campus somewhere within the third district of Cagayan.

===== Cordillera Administrative Region =====
The Philippine Science High School - Cordillera Administrative Region Campus in Baguio City is the PSHSS Cordillera Administrative Region campus situated in Baguio. It was established on September 11, 2008, and formally opened the following year.

===== Central Luzon =====
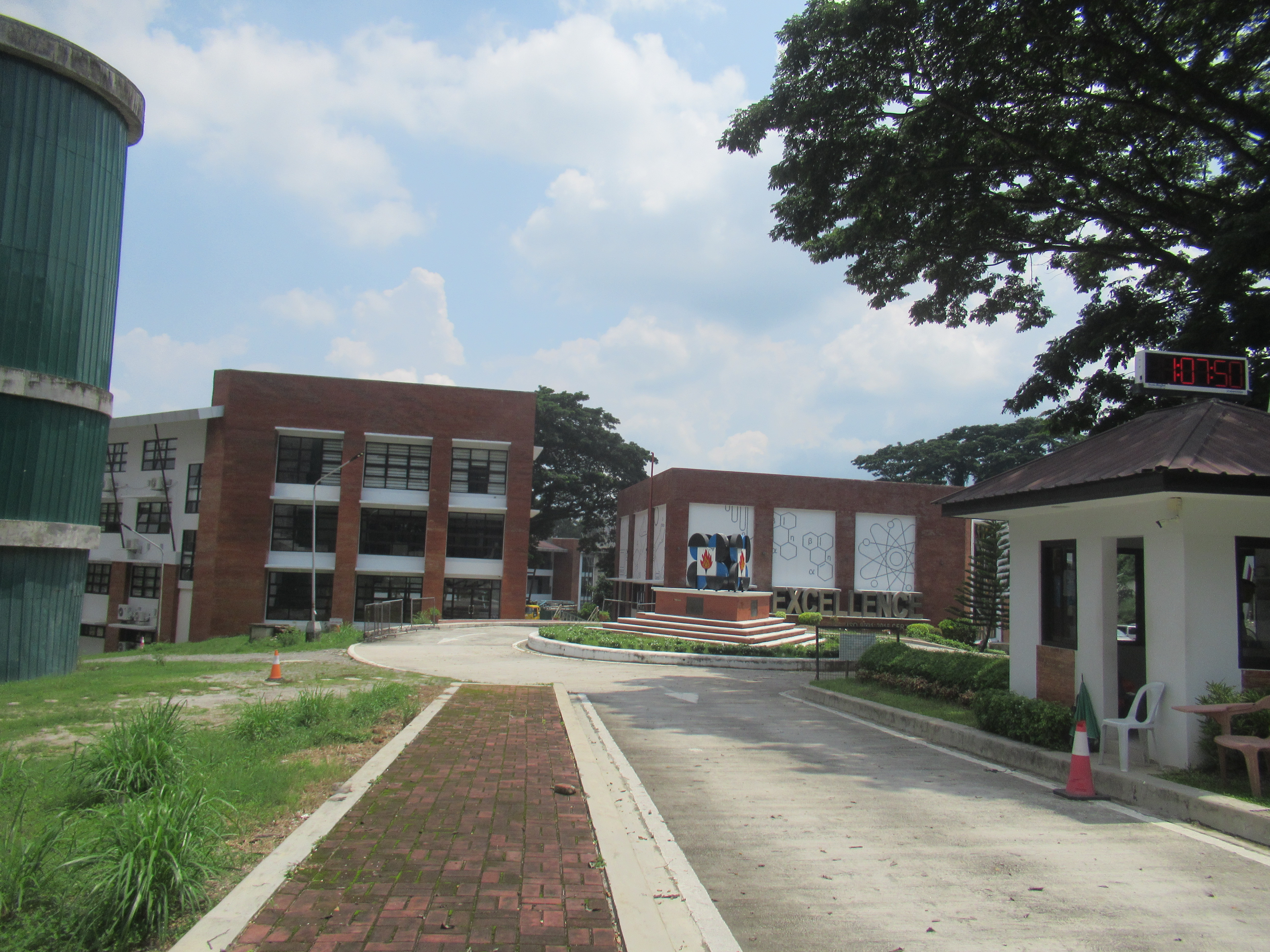
Central Luzon Campus

The Philippine Science High School - Central Luzon Campus in Clark Freeport Zone is the PSHSS campus for Central Luzon. First opened in 2009, it was initially housed within the Clark Polytechnic School compound.

===== Calabarzon =====
The Philippine Science High School - Calabarzon Region Campus in Batangas City is the PSHSS Calabarzon campus situated in Batangas City. Initially, the campus was located in Bahay Kaalaman at the Batangas National High School Compound from July 2015 until it transferred permanently to its current location in 2017.

===== Mimaropa =====
The Philippine Science High School - Mimaropa Region Campus in Romblon is the PSHSS Mimaropa campus situated in Odiongan, Romblon.

===== Bicol =====
The Philippine Science High School - Bicol Region Campus in Camarines Sur is the PSHSS Bicol Region campus situated in Goa, Camarines Sur.

PSHS–BRC was established as the Philippine Science High School – Camarines Sur Campus after the conversion of San Rafael National High School through Republic Act 8304 in 1996 as amended by Republic Act 8619 in 1998. During this period, the campus was situated in Tigaon, Camarines Sur.

After difficulties housing the studentry of the old San Rafael National High School and the scholars of the Camarines Sur Campus, a move to restore the old High School was made. This prompted the need for the Camarines Sur Campus for a different campus site, which was granted by the Local Government Unit of Goa. As the newly donated site still needs development, the Camarines Sur Campus was welcomed into the Partido State College when it had to move out of the San Rafael National High School after its reestablishment.

In 2001, the campus was renamed Bicol Region Campus. In April 2002, BRC was forced to move to its then-under-development campus.

The Expanded PSHS System Act or Republic Act No. 12310 proposed the establishment of a second Bicol campus somewhere within the Polangui, Albay.

==== Visayas ====
===== Western Visayas =====
The Philippine Science High School - Western Visayas Campus in Iloilo City is the PSHSS Western Visayas campus situated in Iloilo City.

The Expanded PSHS System Act or Republic Act No. 12310 proposed the establishment of a second Western Visayas campus somewhere within the first district of Aklan.

===== Negros Island Region =====
The PSHS Negros Island Region Campus will be situated at Brgy. Granada, Bacolod City, although by law, there is a mandate to establish a second campus eventually.

===== Central Visayas =====
The Philippine Science High School - Central Visayas Campus in Cebu is the PSHSS Central Visayas campus situated in Argao, Cebu. The PSHS Board of Trustees approved the creation of the Central Visayas campus on September 30, 2005. The school itself opened in 2006.

The Expanded PSHS System Act or Republic Act No. 12310 proposed the establishment of a second Central Visayas campus in Ubay, Bohol.

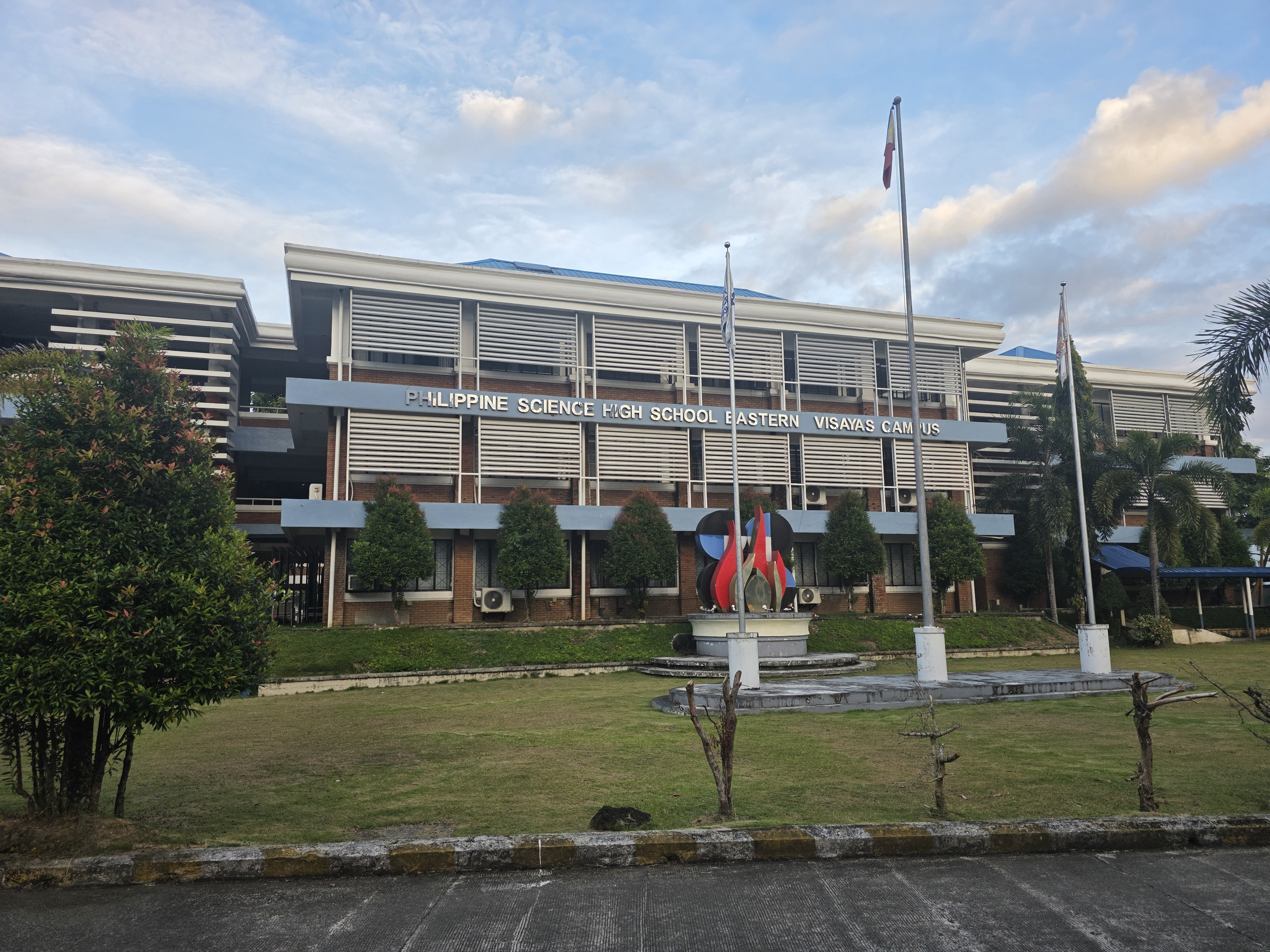
Eastern Visayas Campus in Leyte's ACA Buildings Exterior

===== Eastern Visayas =====
The Philippine Science High School - Eastern Visayas Campus in Leyte (PSHS-EVC) is the PSHSS Eastern Visayas campus situated in Palo, Leyte.

PSHS-EVC was originally founded on April 10, 1992, following the passing of Republic Act No. 7373 under the name of Eastern Visayas Science High School. During its first year, the school originally operated from an area rented from the Leyte Normal University in Tacloban City, Leyte. This is because Tacloban and Palo were the two possible locations designated by RA No. 7373 as to where the school could be located.

On June 15, 1995, Republic Act No. 8057 then renamed Eastern Visayas Science High School to Philippine Science High School - Eastern Visayas Campus to align with its incorporation into the PSHSS. Due to Republic Act No. 12310, which encourages all regions in the Philippines to have two PSHS campuses each, PSHS-EVC renamed its official name to The Philippine Science High School - Eastern Visayas Campus in Leyte on October, 2025 to allow for a possible campus in Samar.

==== Mindanao ====
===== Northern Mindanao =====
The Philippine Science High School Northern Mindanao Campus in Lanao del Norte, formerly the Philippine Science High School Central Mindanao Campus, is the PSHSS campus for Northern Mindanao situated in Balo-i, Lanao del Norte.

The Expanded PSHS System Act or Republic Act No. 12310 proposed the establishment of a second Northern Mindanao campus somewhere in Bukidnon.

===== Davao =====
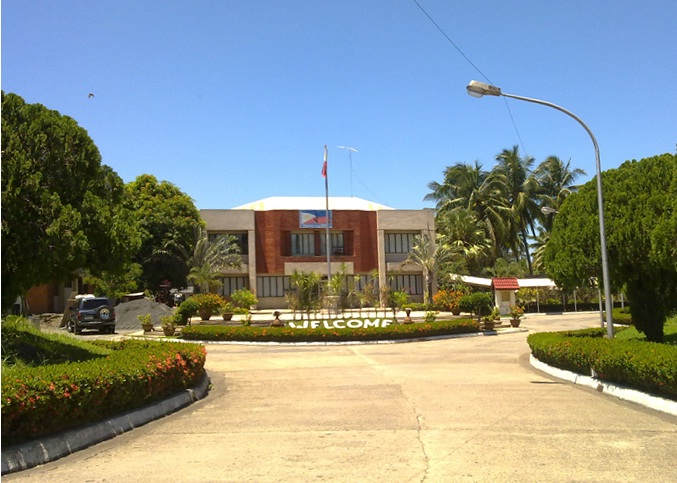
Davao Region Campus

The Philippine Science High School - Davao Region Campus in Davao City, formerly the Philippine Science High School Southern Mindanao Campus, is the PSHSS campus for the Davao Region.

===== Soccsksargen =====
The Philippine Science High School - Soccsksargen Region Campus in Koronadal City is the PSHSS campus for Soccsksargen situated in South Cotabato. The school began operations on June 17, 2013.

The Expanded PSHS System Act or Republic Act No. 12310 proposed the establishment of a second campus in General Santos.

===== Caraga =====
Caraga Region Campus

The Philippine Science High School - Caraga Region Campus in Butuan City is the PSHSS Caraga campus situated in Butuan. It was established in 2012.

===== Zamboanga Peninsula =====
The Philippine Science High School Zamboanga Peninsula Region Campus in Dipolog City is the PSHSS Zamboanga Peninsula campus situated in Dipolog. It opened in August 2016 at the Dipolog Sports Complex before moving to its permanent site in Barangay Cogon in October 2019.

The Expanded PSHS System Act or Republic Act No. 12310 proposed the establishment of a second campus in Labangan, Zamboanga del Sur.

===== Bangsamoro =====
There is no PSHS campus within the Bangsamoro autonomous region. The DOST does not hold a regional office in the Bangsamoro and hence the mandate to establish a campus does not apply for the region.

However the autonomous regional government maintains the Bangsamoro Science High School established in 2023 via Bangsamoro Autonomy Act No. 40 which is patterned after the PSHS system. The BSHS campus will be built in Parang, Maguindanao del Norte.

=== Summary ===
Currently, each region in the Philippines, with an incoming Negros Island Region one, has a campus, except for the Bangsamoro.

Region	Campus	Location	Establishment (opening date)
NCR	Main Campus	Diliman, Quezon City	June 22, 1963 (September 5, 1964)
1 (I)	Ilocos Region Campus	San Ildefonso, Ilocos Sur	February 6, 2002 (July 14, 2003)
2 (II)	Cagayan Valley Campus	Masoc, Bayombong, Nueva Vizcaya	July 3, 1992
3 (III)	Central Luzon Campus	Clark Freeport Zone, Angeles City, Pampanga	(June 28, 2009)
4-A (IV-A)	CALABARZON Region Campus	Sampaga, Batangas City, Batangas	November 2013 (July 20, 2015)
4-B (IV-B)	MIMAROPA Region Campus	Rizal, Odiongan, Romblon	April 2016
5 (V)	Bicol Region Campus	Tagongtong, Goa, Camarines Sur	July 1998
CAR	Cordillera Administrative Region Campus	Irisan, Baguio City, Benguet	(June 22, 2009)
6 (VI)	Western Visayas Campus	Jaro, Iloilo City, Iloilo	February 5, 1986 (July 1, 1993)
7 (VII)	Central Visayas Campus	Talaytay, Argao, Cebu	September 30, 2005
8 (VIII)	Eastern Visayas Campus	Pawing, Palo, Leyte	February 1, 1992
NIR	Negros Island Region Campus	Brgy. Granada, Bacolod, Negros Occidental	under construction
9 (IX)	Zamboanga Peninsula Region Campus	Cogon, Dipolog City, Zamboanga del Norte	2015
10 (X)	Northern Mindanao Campus	Nangka, Balo-i, Lanao del Norte	July 1998
11 (XI)	Davao Region Campus	Tugbok, Davao City, Davao del Sur	February 5, 1986 (July 1988)
12 (XII)	SOCCSKSARGEN Region Campus	Paraiso, Koronadal City, South Cotabato	February 3, 2012
13 (XIII)	Caraga Region Campus	Ampayon, Butuan City, Agusan del Norte	2013
BARMM	No campus		

== Organization ==
The Board of Trustees (BOT) is the highest policy making body of the PSHS System. The executive committee (ExeCom), composed of the directors of different PSHS campuses, is a collegial body that recommends policies and guidelines for the consideration of the BOT. The executive committee is chaired by the executive director, who coordinates the implementation of these policies and guidelines. PSHS campuses are headed by directors who are members of the ExeCom.

== Admissions ==
Admission into any campus of the system can be done through the National Competitive Examination (NCE), Lateral Admission Qualifying Examination (LAQE), or intercampus transfer. This also formerly replaced by the Requirements for Admission, Criteria, and Evaluation (RACE) System during the COVID-19 pandemic.

=== National Competitive Examination ===
Students who wish to study in a campus within the Philippine Science High School System must take an entrance exam to beadmitted called the National Competitive Examination which covers English, science, mathematics, and abstract reasoning. A grade school student must belong to the top ten percent of their graduating class or have an aptitude in mathematics and science.

The NCE is reputed to be competitive with limited slots per academic year only available. As per the Second Congressional Commission on Education (EDCOM 2) Year 2 report, 49,481 took the NCE in a bid to get admitted in the PSHSS' 16 campuses for the academic years 2022–23 and 2024–25. Only 5,544 of the 11,351 qualified applicants enrolled during that period.

=== Lateral admission – qualifying exam ===
Admission can also be done through lateral admission through the LAQE. A student who has finished Grade 7 or Grade 8 (under the high school curriculum or the new K-12 curriculum) outside of the Philippine Science High School System may be allowed admission to the PSHS if specific requirements are met.

=== Intercampus transfer ===
Scholars of the system may travel to other campuses of the system. Intercampus transfer will only be allowed to incoming Grade 8, 9, or 10 students from a PSHSS campus and approval depends on the slots available in the desired campus to be transferred to. The transferring student must meet certain requirements in order to be considered eligible to transfer.

=== Requirements for Admission, Criteria, and Evaluation ===
For three school years, due to the COVID-19 pandemic, aspiring students for Batches 2027 to 2029 (Note: Batch X is the group of students that will graduate in year X. In this case, Batches 2027, 2028, and 2029 will graduate in those respective years.) made use of the RACE system for admissions, which replaced the NCE during this time period. RACE had a two-step system wherein applicants would first be filtered by their mathematics and science grades during the elementary years. Following which, they would submit a written essay on a given prompt.

== Notable alumni ==
- Vicky Tauli-Corpuz (Batch 1969): Indigenous People's rights advocate; chair, United Nations Permanent Forum on Indigenous Issues
- Cielito Habito (Batch 1970): former Director General of the National Economic and Development Authority
- Hermogenes Esperon (Batch 1970): General; Chief of Staff, Armed Forces of the Philippines
- Butch Dalisay (Batch 1971-A): writer, editor, columnist, Palanca awardee
- Joel Navarro (Batch 1971-B): conductor, singer-composer (Swerte-Swerte Lang), arranger, music professor, and stage actor; Gawad Lagablad Awardee, 1991
- Anna Bayle (Batch 1974): entrepreneur and Asia's first international supermodel
- Miriam Coronel-Ferrer (Batch 1977): peace negotiator and the former chair of the peace panel of the Government of the Philippines
- Jessica Zafra (Batch 1982): fiction writer, columnist, editor, publisher, former television and radio show host, Palanca awardee
- Joseph Emilio Abaya (Batch 1983): former Congressman, 1st district of Cavite, Secretary, Department of Transportation and Communication
- Auraeus Solito (aka Kanakan Balintagos) (Batch 1986): filmmaker, director of the internationally acclaimed Ang Pagdadalaga ni Maximo Oliveros, Tuli, Pisay, Busong: Palawan Fate, and Baybayin: The Palawan Script
- Barry Gutierrez (Batch 1990): former Congressman, spokesperson of former Vice President Leni Robredo
- Luis Katigbak (Batch 1991): writer and music critic
- Karlo Nograles (Batch 1993): Chairman of Civil Service Commission
- Jeffrey Hidalgo (Batch 1994): singer, songwriter, former band member of Smokey Mountain group
- Edgardo Carlo Vistan II (Batch 1994): 12th Chancellor of the University of the Philippines Diliman, 17th Dean of the University of the Philippines College of Law
- Atom Araullo (Batch 2000): television host, reporter and newscaster now with GMA Network
- Reinabelle Reyes (Batch 2001): astrophysicist, Nobel Prize nominee, Director of the Space Science Missions Bureau of the Philippine Space Agency
- Mika Suansing (Batch 2009): Congresswoman representing Nueva Ecija's 1st congressional district and Chairperson of the Committee on Appropriations
- Francesca Regalado (Batch 2013): reporter with The New York Times
- Hillary Diane Andales (Batch 2019, EVC): astrophysicist and science communicator

== See also ==
- Pisay (film), about the experiences of students and faculty of the school during the last years of the dictatorship of President Ferdinand Marcos.
