= Philippine Science High School Main Campus =

Public high school in Quezon City, Philippines

Philippine Science High School – Main Campus in Diliman, Quezon City
- Mataas na Paaralan ng Pilipinas sa Agham - Pangunahing Kampus sa Diliman, Lungsod Quezon (Filipino)

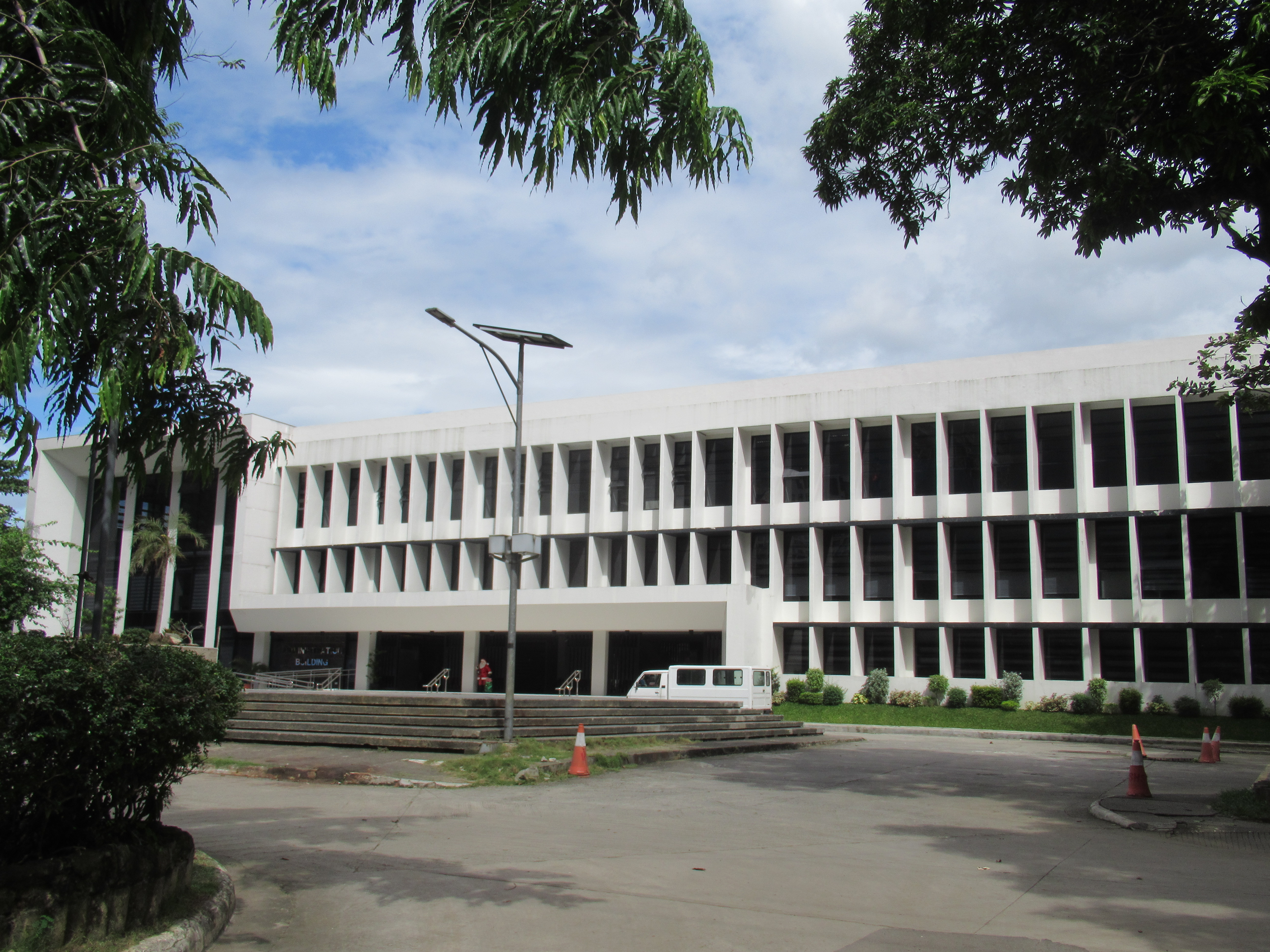
- Administration building

Location
- Quezon City, Metro Manila; Philippines
- 14°39′1.37″N 121°2′27.46″E

Information
- Type: Public specialized high school
- Established: June 22, 1963
- Director: Rod Allan A. De Lara
- Grades: 7 to 12
- Language: Filipino, English
- Website: mc.pshs.edu.ph

The Philippine Science High School - Main Campus in Diliman, Quezon City (PSHS–MC) is the flagship campus of the Philippine Science High School System. It was established as an institution in 1963 and classes started in 1964. It is located in Diliman, Quezon City, Metro Manila, Philippines.

== History ==
The Philippine Science High School (PSHS) was established via Republic Act (RA) No. 3661 which was signed into law by President Diosdado Macapagal on June 22, 1963. It mandated the creation of a school which provides scholarship to students with an emphasis on mathematics and the sciences to prepare them to take on scientific careers.

It is the implementation of a proposal of Leopoldo V. Torralba, a mathematics professor at the New York University who envisioned that type of school for Filipinos patterned after the Bronx High School of Science.

PSHS first opened on September 5, 1964 using rented buildings alongside the Elliptical Road in Quezon City.

In 1966, the PSHS requested the government for a land of its own leading to the construction a campus from 1970 to 1972 in Diliman. The Diliman campus opened in 1973.

The Philippine Science High School System was formalized on February 12, 1998 via RA No. 8496 which became law during President Fidel Ramos's administration. It placed the Diliman (designated as the main) campus and three other institutions in Eastern Visayas, Western Visayas, and Southern Mindanao (now Davao Region) within the grouping.

== Admission ==
Prospect students must take an entrance exam to get admitted to the PSHS called the National Competitive Examinations (NCE). A sixth grade student must belong to the top ten percent of their graduating class and have an aptitude in mathematics and science.

The NCE is reputed to be competitive with only 240 slots per academic year available for the main campus as per the Year Two report of the Second Congressional Commission on Education (EDCOM II) covering 2022 to 2025. Only 754 out 3,234 qualified applicants enrolled during that period.

== In popular culture ==
The school is the subject of the 2007 Filipino drama film Pisay, which was directed by school alumnus Auraeus Solito and was shot entirely within the campus.
