= Philippine Science High School Cagayan Valley Campus =

Public high school in Nueva Vizcaya, Philippines

Location
- Bayombong-Ambaguio Road, Masoc; Bayombong, Nueva Vizcaya 3700; Philippines
- Coordinates: 16°30′08″N 121°06′29″E

Information
- Former name: Nueva Vizcaya Science High School (1992–2001)
- Type: Public specialized high school
- Established: July 3, 1992
- Authority: Philippine Science High School System
- Director: Dr. Harold V. Gallo
- Grades: 7 to 12
- Language: English, Filipino
- Colors: Blue and yellow
- Newspaper: The Pisay Explorer and Ang Siklab
- Website: cvc.pshs.edu.ph

Philippine Science High School – Cagayan Valley Campus (PSHS–CVC) is a campus of the Philippine Science High School System, a specialized public high school that admits and provides scholarships to high school students primarily from the Cagayan Valley region. It is located in Barangay Masoc, Bayombong, Nueva Vizcaya.

Prior to its inclusion into the PSHSS, the school was named the Nueva Vizcaya Science High School, and was located at the Nueva Vizcaya State University compound. It first opened in 1996, four years after the law that created the school had passed in Congress.

== History ==
=== Nueva Vizcaya Science High School ===
PSHS–CVC was established as the Nueva Vizcaya Science High School (NVSHS) from Republic Act 7622 in 1992, passed by then-Congressman Carlos Padilla. Its adopted an academic program patterned after the Science Curriculum of the Department of Education, Culture and Sports. The school which opened in 1996 used to be situated in the same compound as the Nueva Vizcaya State University. In 1997, the control of the NVSHS was transferred to the Department of Science and Technology under Republic Act 8364.

=== Philippine Science High School System ===
In 1998, Republic Act 8496, otherwise known as the "Philippine Science High School (PSHS) System Act of 1997", was approved by then-President Fidel Ramos. This act established a system that merged the four existing PSHS campuses under one system – the Philippine Science High School System. In 2001, the law was amended to include the NVSHS, thus incorporating the school into the system. Under this law, the school was renamed into the Philippine Science High School – Cagayan Valley Campus.

In 2002, under Governor Rodolfo Q. Agbayani, construction of a new compound for the PSHS–CVC started Barangay Masoc in Bayombong, Nueva Vizcaya. In 2010, the PSHS–CVC had completed its relocation onto the new site.
