= Philippine Science High School Davao Region Campus =

Public high school in Davao City, Philippines

Philippine Science High School Davao Region Campus in Davao City

Location
- Santo Niño, Tugbok District; Davao City; Philippines
- Coordinates: 7°05′02″N 125°30′29″E

Information
- Former name: Philippine Science High School–Mindanao Campus (1986–1998); Philippine Science High School–Southern Mindanao Campus (1998–2025)
- Type: Specialized Public High School
- Established: February 5, 1986
- Campus Director: Jonald P. Fenecios
- Grades: 7 to 12
- Enrollment: 358 (SY 2009-2010); 361 (SY 2007-2008)
- Affiliation: Department of Science and Technology
- Contact Details: (+63 82) 293-0002 to 04
- Website: smc.pshs.edu.ph

Philippine Science High School – Davao Region Campus in Davao City (abbreviated as PSHS-DRC in Davao City or PSHS-DRCDC), formerly Philippine Science High School – Southern Mindanao Campus, is the first regional campus of the Philippine Science High School System (PSHSS). It is situated in Davao City, Philippines, and it is among the many specialized public high schools in the Philippines, along with other PSHSS Campuses. It caters to scientifically and mathematically gifted high school students from the Davao Region of the country.

== History ==
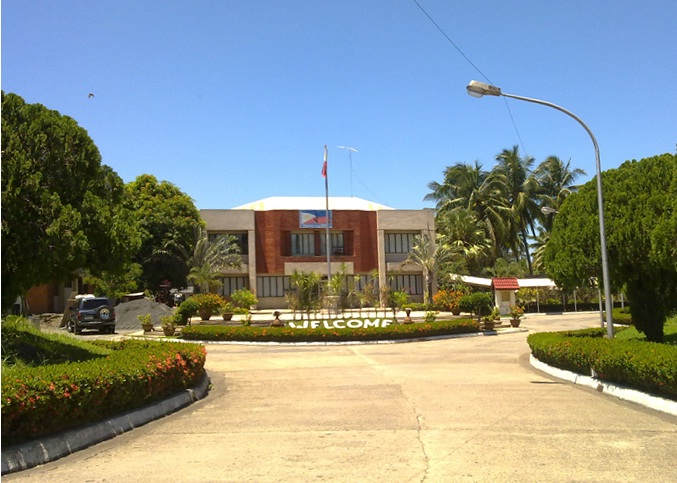
PSHS-DRC in Davao City Admin Building

On February 5, 1986, Executive Order No. 1090 was issued by President Ferdinand Marcos establishing new Philippine Science High School (PSHS) campuses in the Visayas and Mindanao to complement the first PSHS campus in Quezon City.

Philippine Science High School Davao Region Campus, was established as the PSHS Mindanao Campus (PSHS–MC) prior to the creation of the PSHS Northern Mindanao Campus in Lanao del Norte. was first established at the Philippine Coconut Authority grounds in Bago Oshiro, Barangay Mintal in Tugbok District. It was officially opened on July 8, 1988.

On December 28, 1990, the PSHC–MC moved to its current site in Santo Nino, Tugbok District. It later changed its name to the Philippine Science High School – Southern Mindanao Campus (PSHS–SMC).

The Philippine Science High School System was formalized in February 12, 1998 via Republic Act No. 8496 which became law during President Fidel Ramos's administration. This legislation placed the Mindanao campus and three other existing PSHS campuses under a single system of governance and management.

On October 15, 2025, PSHS – Southern Mindanao Campus was renamed to PSHS – Davao Region Campus in Davao City, following the implementation of Republic Act No. 12310, or the Expanded Philippine Science High School System Act.
