= Anna Bayle =

Filipino model, editor and businesswoman (born 1956)

- Born: December 6, 1956 (age 69); Manila, Philippines
- Education: Philippine Science High School System University of the Philippines
- Occupations: Fashion Model, Editorial Assistant, Real Estate Agent
- Years active: 1976 to 1994
- Children: 1
- Modeling information
- Height: 5 ft 10 in (1.78 m)
- Hair color: Black
- Eye color: Brown
- Website: www.annabayle.com

Anna Bayle (Tagalog: [ɑnɑ bɑjlɛ]; born December 6, 1956) is a Filipino model, editor and businesswoman. Dubbed the first Asian supermodel, she was one of the world's highest-paid models of her time and has collaborated with the top fashion houses. In 2023, Harper's Bazaar ranked her third among the greatest supermodels in the 1980s.

== Life and career ==
Bayle was born in 1956 in Manila to a family of seven. After graduating from the Philippine Science High School System, she became a pre-medical student at the University of the Philippines. After being encouraged by her friends at university, Bayle competed in the 1976 Miss Republic of the Philippines where she was declared Miss Luzon or 1st runner up, where Filipino fashion designer Auggie Cordero noticed her. With Cordero as her mentor, Bayle began working in the local modeling scene. After moving to Hong Kong for a little while, she received attention on an international scale when she replaced Billie Blair in the Hong Kong Trade Fashion Show, after Blair withdrew from the event due to an accident.

Shortly after, Bayle began working in Paris for four years, with the intention of finding work in New York. Her first show in Paris was for French fashion designer Thierry Mugler. Eventually, she began to find work in America. She did national and international campaigns for fashion houses and major department stores, as well as calendars for Elite Modeling Agency and Shiseido Cosmetics. She was featured in numerous fashion books, such as Thierry Mugler, Chanel, Scaasi, Valentino, Versace, YSL, Dior, Fashion Illustrations by Antonio, etc. Bayle was photographed by fashion photographers including Helmut Newton, Norman Parkinson, Sante D'Orazio, Peter Beard, David Seidner, Oliviero Toscani, Arthur Elgort, Patrick Demarchelier, Peter Lindbergh, Victor Skrebneski, Alex Chatelain and Paolo Roversi. As she became more popular, Bayle became known for her unique runway walk, which The New York Times described "as if she were crushing a cigarette butt with each step down the runway".

=== Retirement from modeling ===
Bayle decided to retire from modeling in 1994. Recalling her decision to quit, she said, "I wanted to end on a high note, and when I retired, I never looked back [...] It's best to leave when you're at the top". After retiring from modeling, she worked as an editorial assistant for CNN Style for two years. In 1997, Bayle released a collection of lipsticks bearing her name. First released in August 1997 at Henri Bendel, the lipstick line was inspired by Bayle's frustration during her modeling career of not finding suitable lipstick colors for her darker complexion. It was around this time however, that Bayle divorced from her husband, and she soon stepped away from her career to take care of her son Callum. While taking care of her child, Bayle found work in helping a real estate investing business manage its clients. As Callum grew older and more independent, she became a real estate broker in New York City.

Currently, Bayle serves as the beauty editor for online fashion publication Lookonline.

== Personal life ==
Bayle was married to Simon Spence, but the couple later divorced. With Spence, she has a son named Callum.
