= Pisay (film) =

- Directed by: Auraeus Solito
- Written by: Auraeus Solito; Henry Grajeda
- Produced by: Auraeus Solito
- Starring: Eugene Domingo; Gammy Lopez; Annicka Dolonius; Carl John Barrameda; Elijah Castillo; Shayne Fajutagana
- Cinematography: Charlie Peralta
- Edited by: Kanakan Balintagos; Mikael Pestaño
- Music by: Jobin Ballesteros; Vincent de Jesus
- Production companies: Solito Arts & Road Runner
- Release date: July 2007 (Cinemalaya)
- Running time: 230 minutes
- Country: Philippines
- Languages: Filipino; English; Cebuano; Hiligaynon

Pisay is a 2007 Filipino drama film directed by Auraeus Solito, written by Henry Grajeda and starring Gammy Lopez, Annicka Dolonius, Carl John Barrameda, and Elijah Castillo. The film, set in the 1980s, is centred upon the experiences of students and faculty of the Philippine Science High School during the last years of the dictatorship of President Ferdinand Marcos.

== Plot ==
The film tells the stories of different students of the Philippine Science High School's (PSHS) 1986 batch and its faculty in the waning years of the Marcos dictatorship.

In Freshman year (1982-1983), Rom, a student from a working-class family is belatedly admitted into the school and strikes a romantic relationship with a more affluent classmate, Wena. Their relationship is opposed by their teacher, Mrs. Casas, citing school policy against romantic relationships among students and the possible toll on their grades. The mounting pressure culminates in Rom forcibly kissing Wena, but Wena breaks off their relationship, saying that her destiny has been pre-ordained, and returns their memorabilia of their relationship to him before going their separate ways.

In Sophomore year (1983-1984), Mateo struggles in his geometry class while dealing with being bullied in his dormitory and the assassination of Ninoy Aquino, which also dampens the student's spirits despite many of them being exempted from the final exam. After his geometry teacher expresses concern, Mateo confesses that he has lost his passion to study. Mateo fails his final exam and is expelled, but finds himself at peace after the geometry teacher tells him about the Bell curve and acknowledges how he did his best amidst his own personal problems. In a final act of revenge, Mateo sabotages his bully's lab experiment, to the latter's consternation.

In Junior year (1984-1985), Liway is a outspoken student well-versed in politics and humanities but struggling to pass her chemistry class, jokingly asking to Ms. Casas if there is an application form for "Philippine Social Science High School". A fellow student, Andy, offers to help her in a chemistry project during which they build a romantic relationship. At the same time, Liway denounces plans to split the classes into upper and lower-halves based on students' academic performance, which is supported by Ms. Casas, and comes into conflict with the latter over other issues such as neglected school amenities and the school budget. However, Liway is forced to flee to the Netherlands after her family is subjected to political persecution, leaving Andy to present their project alone. Andy later receives a postcard from Liway.

In Senior year (1985-1986), Mr. G. and Ms. Fanny are faculty members well-versed in theatre. They are joined by Euri, a theatrically talented student, in making plays focusing on the ongoing political crisis. Euri asks Mr. G. why he did not pursue acting; Mr. G answers that it was martial law at the time and that he was afraid of himself and losing his US scholarship. Moved by his experience, Euri defies the PSHS requirements on applying only for science-related courses in college and applies for Theatre Arts instead.

The constant student in the film is Minggoy, who is interested in astronomy and awaits the arrival of Halley's Comet upon their graduation in 1986. He interacts with the main characters in every year and acts as a bridge between them. However, Minggoy collapses during Senior Year and is diagnosed with a serious illness, preventing him from attending his graduation.

When the People Power Revolution breaks out, a student, Daki, convinces his classmates to join, while Ms. Casas confesses her fears of a repeat of students disappearing during Martial Law and is granted leave to finish her dissertation. On the eve of their graduation, Wena tells Rom that she is bound for the U.S. with her family. Rom jokingly asks her to be his partner at the graduation ball. Mateo, who excels at his new school, returns to PSHS for a visit and is greeted by his geometry teacher. During the celebrations, a bedridden Minggoy asks his grandmother about her age, to which she reveals she was born at the same year Halley's Comet last appeared (1910). They then look at the Moon using a telescope that Minggoy made.

The film ends with the students being called one-by-one by the teachers, with Minggoy's chair left vacant.

== Cast ==
- Gammy Lopez as Roman "Rom" Meneses
- Annicka Dolonius as Rowena "Wena" Ledesma
- Carl John Barrameda as Mateo Markado
- Elijah Castillo as Miguel "Minggoy" Lamazan
- Shayne Fajutagana as Liwayway "Liway" Claver
- Jonathan Neri as Andres "Andy" Gallardo
- EJ Jallorina as Euripedes "Euri" Calo
- Alfred Labatos as Dakila "Daki" Lim
- Eugene Domingo as Ms. Casas
- Arnold Reyes as Mr. G
- Rowena Basco as Ms. Fanny
- Glecy Atienza as Dra. Claver

== Production ==
The film, was shot entirely inside the Philippine Science High School Main Campus in Quezon City and was directed by Solito, himself an alumnus of the school.

== Release ==
The film was released on February 20, 2008, in the Philippines and was also shown in Canada, South Korea, Germany, France and Singapore at different film festivals.

== Awards ==
Pisay won awards for Best Director, Best Production Design, and Audience Choice Awards at the 2008 Cinemalaya Philippine Independent Film Festival. Internationally, it won the Audience Award and International Jury Prize at the 2008 Vesoul Asian Film Festival.
