= Philippine Science High School Calabarzon Region Campus =

Public high school in Batangas, Philippines

Philippine Science High School - CALABARZON Region Campus in Batangas City
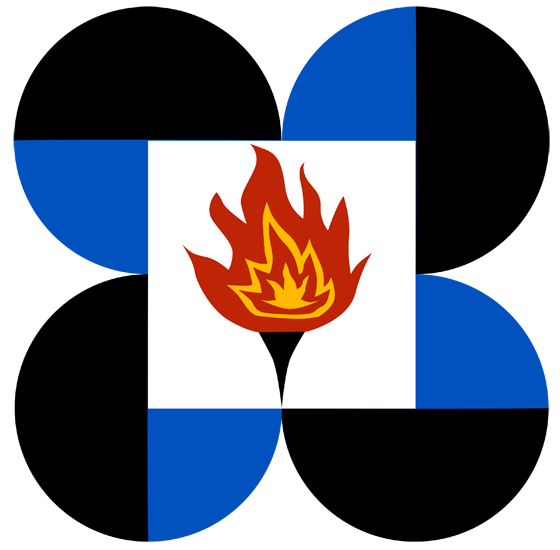

Location
- Brgy. Sampaga; Batangas City, Batangas; Philippines
- Coordinates: 13°45′34″N 121°05′30″E

Information
- Type: Public Specialized High School
- Established: 2013
- Campus Director: Rex S. Forteza
- Grades: 7 to 12
- Color: Blue White Yellow
- Accreditation: ISO:2015 Accredited
- Newspaper: The Calabarzon Scholar (English); Siklab ng Katagalugan (Filipino)
- Affiliation: Department of Science and Technology
- Language: English and Filipino
- Website: cbzrc.pshs.edu.ph

The Philippine Science High School - CALABARZON Region Campus in Batangas City (PSHS–CALABARZONRC) is a public secondary education institution in Batangas City, Batangas, Philippines. As part of the Philippine Science High School System, PSHS-CALABARZONRC is intended to cater to students gifted in science and mathematics in Calabarzon.

== History ==
The Philippine Science High School Calabarzon Region Campus (PSHS–CALABARZONRC) is one of the institutions under the Philippine Science High School System.

The PSHS–CALABARZONRC stands on a 5-hectare open lot at Brgy. Sampaga, Batangas City in the administrative region of CALABARZON, Philippines. The location of the CALABARZON campus was donated in March 2013. The campus location was formally finalized in November 2013 when then Department of Science and Technology Secretary (DOST) Mario Montejo and the school's board of trustees signed Resolution No. 2013-11-34, which established the regional campus.

Previously, the campus was located in Bahay Kaalaman at the Batangas National High School Compound from July 2015 until it transferred permanently to its current location in 2017.
