= Philippine Science High School Western Visayas Campus =

Public high school in Iloilo City, Philippines

Philippine Science High School Western Visayas Campus in Iloilo City

Location
- Barangay Bito-on, Jaro District; Iloilo City, Iloilo; Philippines; 10°45′13″N 122°35′15″E

Information
- Type: specialized public high school
- Established: February 5, 1986
- School district: Jaro, Iloilo City
- Campus Director: Myrna B. Libutaque
- Faculty: approximately 50
- Grades: 7 to 12
- Enrollment: approximately 710 (at present)
- Campus: Rural, 3.4 hectares
- Newspaper: Sci-Link
- Affiliation: Department of Science and Technology
- Admission: National Competitive Examination
- Website: wvc.pshs.edu.ph

The Philippine Science High School Western Visayas Campus in Iloilo City or the PSHS-WVC in Iloilo City (formerly the Philippine Science High School Western Visayas Campus or PSHS–WVC) is a public secondary education institution in Iloilo City, Philippines. As part of the Philippine Science High School System, PSHS–WVC in Iloilo City is intended to cater to students gifted in science and mathematics in Western Visayas.

== History ==
The first Philippine Science High School (PSHS) was established in 1963 which opened in Quezon City in 1964.

This was followed by the establishment of a PSHS campuses in Visayas and Mindanao through Executive Order No. 1090 on February 5, 1986 signed by President Ferdinand Marcos. However it would take a few years before the actual buildings and structures of the new school be constructed.

On August 21, 1991, a 3.4-hectare (8.4-acre) in Bito-on, Jaro, Iloilo City was donated to the Department oF Science and Technology for the future Western Visayas campus which was dubbed as the Lawa-an H. Lopez Campus. Construction work began in February 1992 with the groundbreaking ceremony held later in May of the same year.

The PSHS-WV began operations on July 1, 1993 with initially 47 students. They held classes at the University of the Philippines Visayas since the intended campus is still under construction. It was only for the academic year 1994–15, that classes started to be held at the Jaro campus. The PSHS-WV was formally inaugurated on 13 June 1997 by President Fidel V. Ramos.

Republic Act No. 8496 of President Fidel V. Ramos integrated PSHS-WV and three other schools under the newly institutionalized Philippine Science High School System. The law placed the four institutions under a single system of governance and management.

The Expanded Philippine Science High School (PSHS) System Act or the RA 12310 officially renamed the campus as the PSHS-WVC in Iloilo City as the second campus for Western Visayas is propsed to be put up in a municipality within the First Congressional District of Aklan.

== Facilities ==
The Philippine Science High School Western Visayas Campus itself has campuses and areas of its own. The PSHS-WVC's main area in Barangay Bito-on, Jaro, Iloilo City is the Lawa-an H. Lopez Campus. The research station in Balcon Maravilla in Jordan, Guimaras is known as the Mosqueda Campus since it was donated by the family of Vice Governor Guardilino Mosqueda. Another lot, donated by engineer Jose Abad in Morubauan, Guimaras is intended to be a site of a research station in marine biology.
