= Philippine Science High School Northern Mindanao Campus =

Public high school in Lanao del Norte, Philippines

Philippine Science High School – Northern Mindanao Campus in Lanao del Norte

Location
- Nangka; Balo-i, Lanao del Norte; Philippines
- 8°08′38.92″N 124°12′06.27″E

Information
- Type: Specialized Public High School
- Established: July 1, 1998
- Campus Director: Chuchi P. Garganera
- Grades: 7 to 12
- Song: PSHS - Hymn
- Nickname: Pisay Enemsi (formerly Pisay Siemsi)
- Affiliation: Department of Science and Technology
- Website: cmc.pshs.edu.ph

Philippine Science High School – Northern Mindanao Campus in Lanao del Norte (PSHS-NMC in Lanao del Norte or PSHS-NMCLDN), formerly Philippine Science High School – Central Mindanao Campus (PSHS-CMC), is the second Mindanao campus of the Philippine Science High School System, a specialized public high school in the Philippines. It caters to scientifically and mathematically gifted high school students from all over the country especially those in Northern Mindanao. It is located in Nangka, Balo-i, Lanao del Norte.

== History ==
On November 5, 1996, a bill was passed in the House of Representatives by then Representative of 2nd District Lanao del Norte, Hon. Abdullah Mangotara and was signed into law by virtue of Republic Act No. 8461 dated January 19, 1998. This is an “Act Establishing the Philippine Science High School – Lanao del Norte Campus and Appropriating Funds Therefore”. The original site was at Mt. Torong-Torong, Tubod, Lanao del Norte.

On June 1, 1998, a memorandum of agreement (MOA) was entered into by the PSHS-LNC/PSHS System represented by Dr. Vicenta F. Reyes, Department of Science and Technology (DOST) represented by Secretary William G. Padolina and Lanao del Norte Provincial Government represented by Governor Imelda Quibranza Dimaporo for the realization of the establishment of the science high school. It was stipulated in the MOA that the Provincial Government will

- provide a site and building and motor vehicle
- provide a trust fund of 4.5 million to pay for stipends, book allowances, transportation costs, salaries of teachers and employees for the initial year of operations
- ensure the safety of scholars, faculty and administrative staff assigned.

Lanao del Norte Campus formally opened on July 1, 1998, housed temporarily at Maranding Central Elementary School in Maranding, Lala, Lanao del Norte. It started with only one classroom, a small office served as faculty room and two small dormitories to accommodate the 26 pioneering scholars coming from the municipalities of the province. The administration was composed of five faculty members — Jose Marlon A. Caumeran Richard B. Jumawan, Dulce Corazon Kenady, Franklin L. Salisid and Teodulo Miranda — and three administrative staff — Lucia Cielito A. Gillamac, Gerard M. Santos, and Elena C. Pasahingue-Marmes. Flor M. Temple, SST IV from PSHS-Diliman Campus was detailed as officer-in-charge of the campus until a director was appointed. On October 29, 1998, Prof. Ciriaco M. Gillera, Ph.D. of MSU-IIT, was appointed campus director on secondment status.

The Provincial Government of Lanao del Norte was able to release 2.3 million to cover Personal Services (PS) and Maintenance and Other Operating Expenses for July–December 1998. Effective January 1, 1999, the operational cost of the campus was included in the 1999 General Appropriations Act including the 16 million budget for the construction of academic and dormitory buildings 1 phase 1.

The DOST WIDE Bids and Awards Committee conducted the bidding on construction when the House Bill 1190, transfer of site from the Municipality of Tubod to Balo-i, Lanao del Norte took effect. In December 2000 the project was awarded to PIRRA Construction and Enterprises of Bocaue, Bulacan.

With the increasing number of scholars, faculty and staff, there was a need for more classrooms and spaces for science laboratories, dormitories and other instruction facilities. The provincial government let the school use the second floor, Main Stadium Building at Mindanao Civic Center, Tubod as temporary site from April 2001 to March 2007 while the construction of Academic and Dormitory Building in Nangka, Balo-i was in progress.

After eight years, PSHS-CMC was transferred to its permanent site at Nangka, Balo-i, Lanao del Norte although building construction is not yet completed and no perimeter fence yet constructed. Since Academic Building I is up to concrete works and roofing only, temporary walls and partitions are installed using coconut lumber and plywood. The mosque which was in front of the Academic Building was removed through negotiations with municipal officials and imams. For security reasons, the intern-scholars are temporarily housed at TESDA Dormitory which is 5 km from the campus.

=== Mindanao Civic Center (MCC) ===
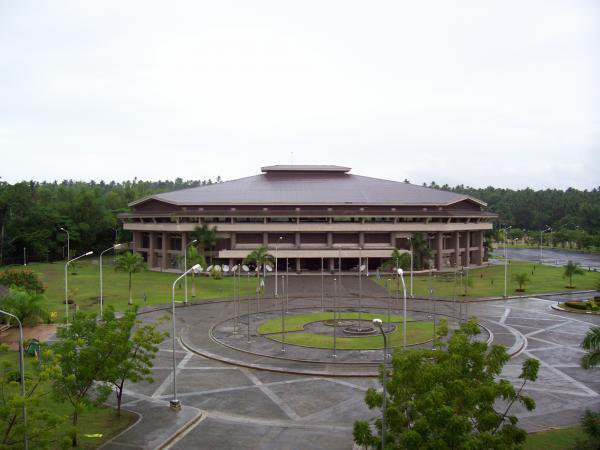
Mindanao Civic Center grounds and gymnasium

The Mindanao Civic Center in Tubod, Lanao del Norte was the temporary site for this campus. During its stay at the MCC, the director's office was on the second floor, MCC Grandstand. The Staff Room, Faculty Room, Computer Laboratory, Accounting Office, Cashier and Boys' Dormitory were on the right wing of the grandstand, while the Chemistry Laboratory, Physics Laboratory, Biology Laboratory, Girls' Dormitory, Girls' Dormitory Annex and I-Ruby on the other wing. The Library, Technology Area and I-Jade was on the first floor. The other rooms were on the side of the MCC Gymnasium. The rooms at the side facing the Grandstand were III-Potassium, II-Rosal, IV-Neutron, I-Emerald and II-Dahlia. On the opposite side of the gym were the sections III-Lithium, IV-Proton, II-Kamia, III-Sodium and IV-Electron. School year 2006–2007 was the last at this site.

=== Transfer to permanent site ===
The school year 2007–2008 was the first school year that classes were conducted in the campus' permanent site. During the transfer, only the academic building and a small canteen were present. The dormitories were not finished so the dormitory was temporarily at TESDA, Ditucalan, Iligan City. The students were transported via school bus. Currently, there is a new canteen beside the boys' dormitory inside the campus and a gymnasium.

=== Implementation of the K+12 program ===
Starting school year 2012–2013, PSHS-CMC, along with all the other campuses of the PSHS system, implemented the K+12 program. All freshmen during the school year will get an additional two years of secondary education, with stronger focus on learning specialized branches of sciences and mathematics. The freshmen under the program started out as Grade 7 and will finish high school with Grade 12. It was the aim that the additional two years would better prepare students emotionally and psychologically to take up subjects such as mathematics and the research discipline that require “more maturity.”

=== Name change ===
As a consequence of the Expanded Philippine Science High School (PSHS) System Act, which mandates that "the PSHS System [..] shall be composed of at least two PSHS campuses in each administrative region of the country," the Philippine Science High School – Central Mindanao Campus was renamed to Philippine Science High School – Northern Mindanao Campus in Lanao del Norte. The establishment of another PSHS campus in Bukidnon is also being considered to fulfill the regional expansion requirement.

== Governance ==
The PSHS Northern Mindanao Campus in Lanao del Norte is one of the campuses of the PSHS System which is under the administrative supervision of the Department of Science and Technology (DOST). The PSHS System Board of Trustees (BOT) is the Governing Board of all the campuses under the PSHS System.

The BOT is chaired by the DOST Secretary, with the Secretary of the Department of Education as vice-chair. The members are the UP President, the PSHS System Executive Director, the Director of the Science Education Institute (SEI), the President of the PSHS National Alumni Association, the chairpersons of the congressional committees in the science and technology of the Senate and the House of Representatives, and one representative from each from higher education, education of the gifted, agriculture, and new emerging technologies.
