= Zamboanga del Norte National High School =

Public high school in Zamboanga del Norte, Philippines

- Seal

Location
- Cirilo Sorronda Road, Estaka; Dipolog, Zamboanga del Norte, 7100; Philippines
- Coordinates: 8°34′57″N 123°20′58″E

Information
- Type: Public
- Established: 1946
- Principal: Joselito S. Tizon
- Hymn: "ZNNHS Hymn"
- Website: znnhs.zdnorte.net

The Zamboanga del Norte National High School (ZNNHS) is a public high school under the Department of Education of the Philippines in Dipolog, Zamboanga del Norte, Mindanao, Philippines.

The curricula offered by the school are Science, Technology, Engineering, & Mathematics Program (formerly, Science and Technology Engineering Program (STEP) and Special Science Curriculum, Enhanced Basic Education Curriculum (EBEP), Special Program for Sports (SPS), Special Program for the Arts (SPA), Technical Vocational Education (TVS), BP-OSA for out of school youths, and Special Program in Journalism (SPJ).

== History ==
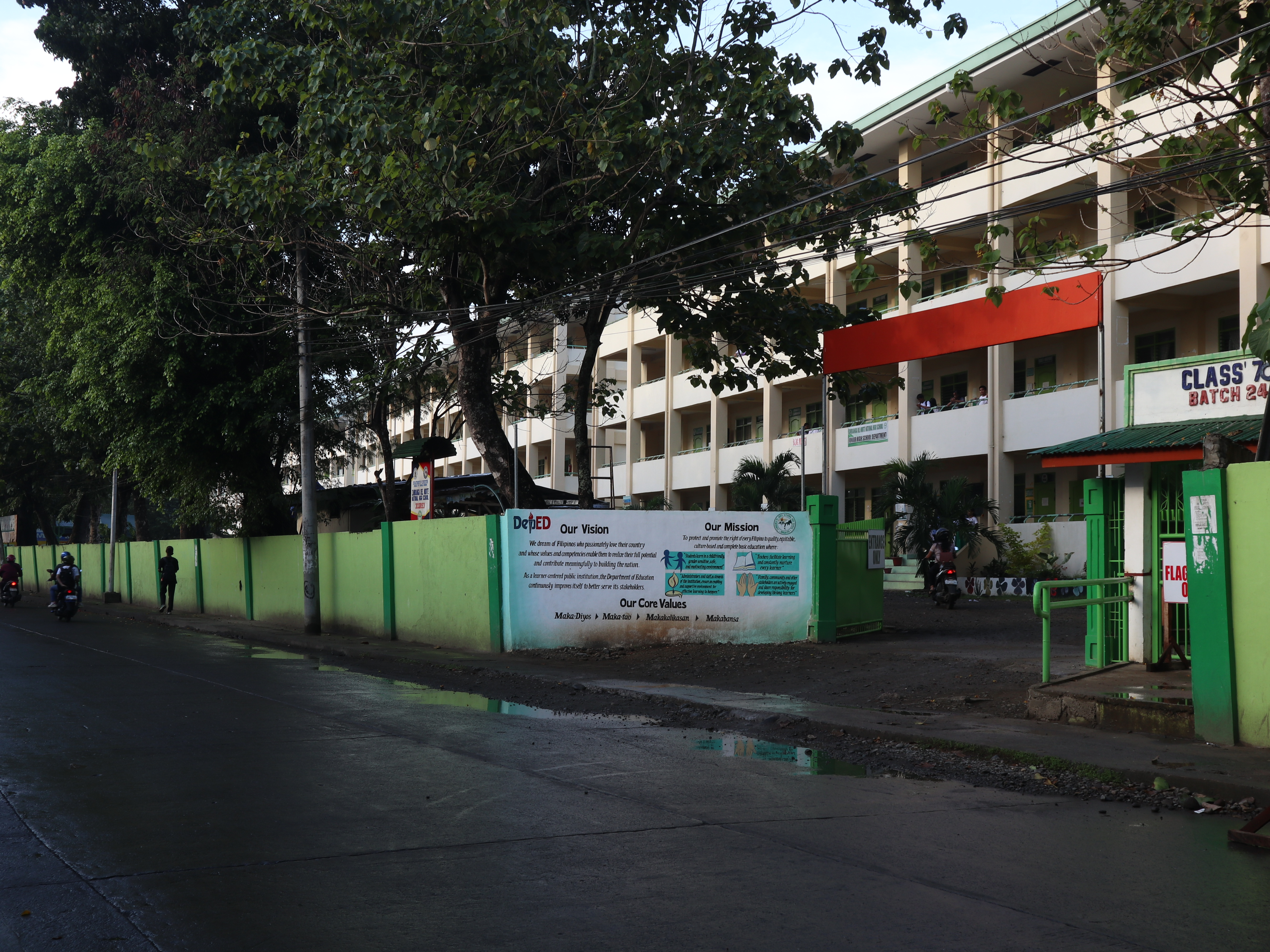
Main entrance at C. Sorronda Road, Estaka

Zamboanga del Norte National High School’s takeoff can be traced to 1946.

The populace’s desire for higher education caused them to travel to nearby island provinces of Negros and Cebu. The provincial government of Zamboanga Peninsula, through former Governor of Zamboanga Province Felipe B. Azcuna, arranged the transfer of Zamboanga Provincial High School, then operating in the erstwhile capital town of Zamboanga (now Zamboanga City), to his hometown in Dipolog.

A drawback is the school's dearth of physical facilities. Since its first hosting of the 1964 Mindanao Athletic Meet, the school has been the venue of a series of local, regional, and national sports fests. In 1982, the Palarong Pambansa caused a renovation of the Zamboanga del Norte Sports Complex where the school is situated at. This renovation required the demolition of 46 classrooms and the Administration Building.

Since the opening, the Zamboanga del Norte National High School is under the jurisdiction of the Division of Zamboanga del Norte; then was transferred to the Division of Dipolog per Republic Act 8174, otherwise known as the General Appropriations Act of 1996 for all budgetary transactions.

Due to the influx of students from neighboring towns and the City of Dapitan, the school needed more space and more rooms. Through the efforts of Patricia G. Ratilla, one of the faculty members, ownership of a lot in Turno, which is a property of the national government for the establishment of the City Normal College, was transferred to ZNNHS through a bill authored by the former Congressman Ernesto S. Amatong. Hence, the existence of the ZNNHS (Campus II) Turno Campus today. In 2023, the Turno Campus was separated to become the independent Zamboanga del Norte National High School-Turno.

In 2015, Campus III (Miputak Campus) was established on the site of the former Miputak West Central School along Jacobo Amatong Street in Barangay Miputak, blocks away from the Dipolog Boulevard. With the sudden influx of secondary students enrolling on its early years, the Miputak Campus became independent on March 25, 2019 becoming what is now Miputak National High School.

== Academics ==
This school offers several programs students.

- The STEP Curriculum (Science, Technology, & Engineering Program): Students who are in this program passed a competitive entrance exam. The first 35 will be in the first section, while the second 35 will be in the second section. They will be trained rigidly for a better future.
- The remaining students will be in the BEC (Basic Education Curriculum).
- Students who have a very high interest in the arts will be acquainted in the SPA (Special Program for Arts).
- The RSTVE trains students who are interested in technical courses.
- The BP-OSA is for those who dropped out of school during their teenage years and are capable of re-entering high school.

There are still more programs the Zamboanga del Norte National High School.

== Principals ==
- Buenaventura Yason, 1946–1952
- Primitivo Adan, 1952–1962
- Lilia Hamac, 1962–1981
- Francisco Gonzales (ex officio), 1981–1983
- Catalina Santiago Sulit, 1983–1994
- Anesia S. Ochotorena (OIC), 1994–1998
- Benigno D. Evardo, 1998–2000
- Sultan Pangsayan T. Radi Sr., 2000–2008
- Elegio C. Ellema, 2008
- Lilibeth G. Ratificar, 2008–2012
- Alexander C. Uy, 2012–2013
- Victorina Perez, 2013–2015
- Edgardo S. Cabalida, 2015–2019
- Adrian G. Refugio, 2019–2021
- Joselito S. Tizon, 2021–present
