= Philippine Science High School Zamboanga Peninsula Region Campus =

Public high school in Zamboanga del Norte, Philippines

Philippine Science High School - Zamboanga Peninsula Region Campus in Dipolog City
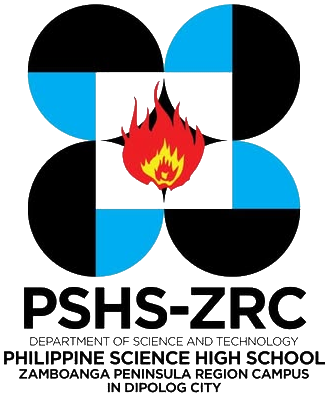

Location
- National Highway, Brgy. Cogon; Dipolog, Zamboanga del Norte; Philippines
- Coordinates: 8°27′32″N 123°21′17″E

Information
- Type: Public specialized science high school
- Established: 2015
- Campus Director: Mr. Edman H. Gallamaso
- Campus: Zamboanga Peninsula Region Campus
- Colors: Blue and White
- Affiliation: Department of Science and Technology
- Admission: National Competitive Examination (NCE; default admission for Filipino sixth graders) Lateral Admissions Qualifying Examination (LAQE; the admission for Filipino seventh and eighth graders) Requirements for Admission Criteria and Evaluation (RACE; 2020-23 admission method)
- Website: zrc.pshs.edu.ph

Philippine Science High School - Zamboanga Peninsula Region Campus in Dipolog City (PSHS-ZRC) is a public secondary education institution in Dipolog, Zamboanga del Norte, Philippines. As part of the Philippine Science High School System (PSHSS), PSHS-ZRC is intended to cater to students gifted in science and mathematics in Zamboanga Peninsula.

== History ==
PSHS-ZRC formally opened in 2015 with its temporary location inside the Dipolog Sports Complex in Barangay Olingan. Its construction started at that time in Barangay Cogon, until its completion in late 2019.
