= Bayombong =

Capital of Nueva Vizcaya, Philippines

- Municipality
- Municipality of Bayombong
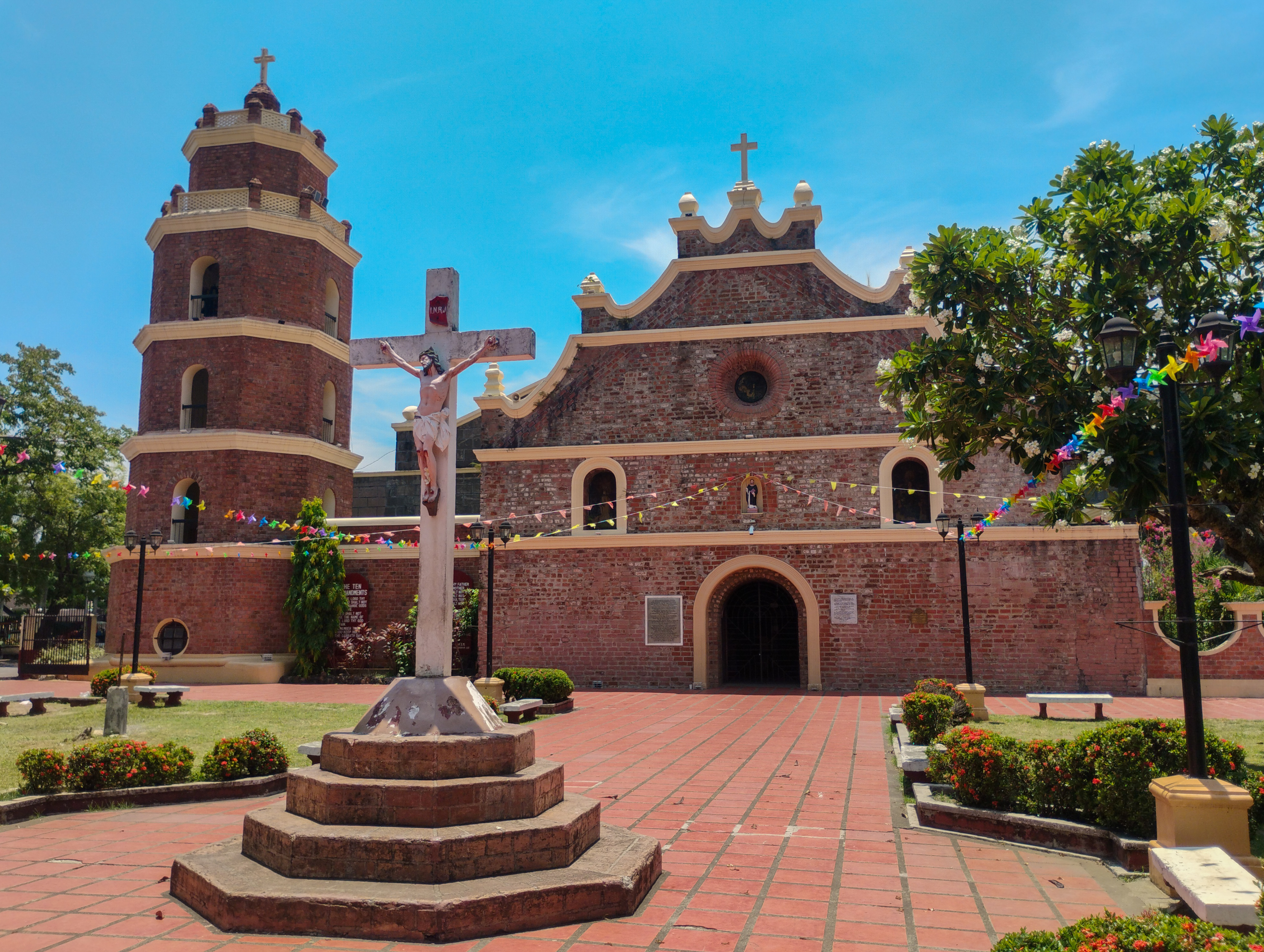
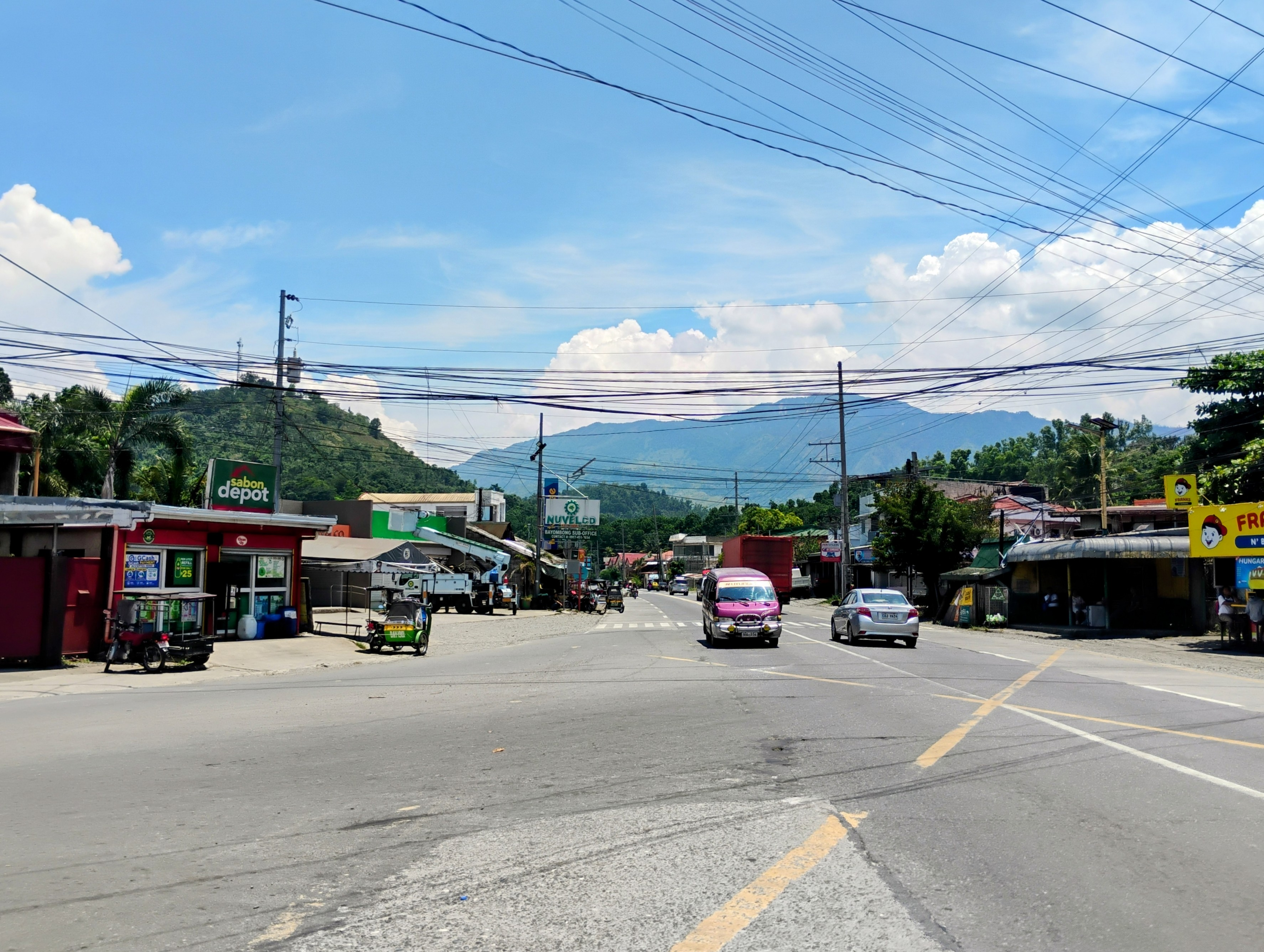
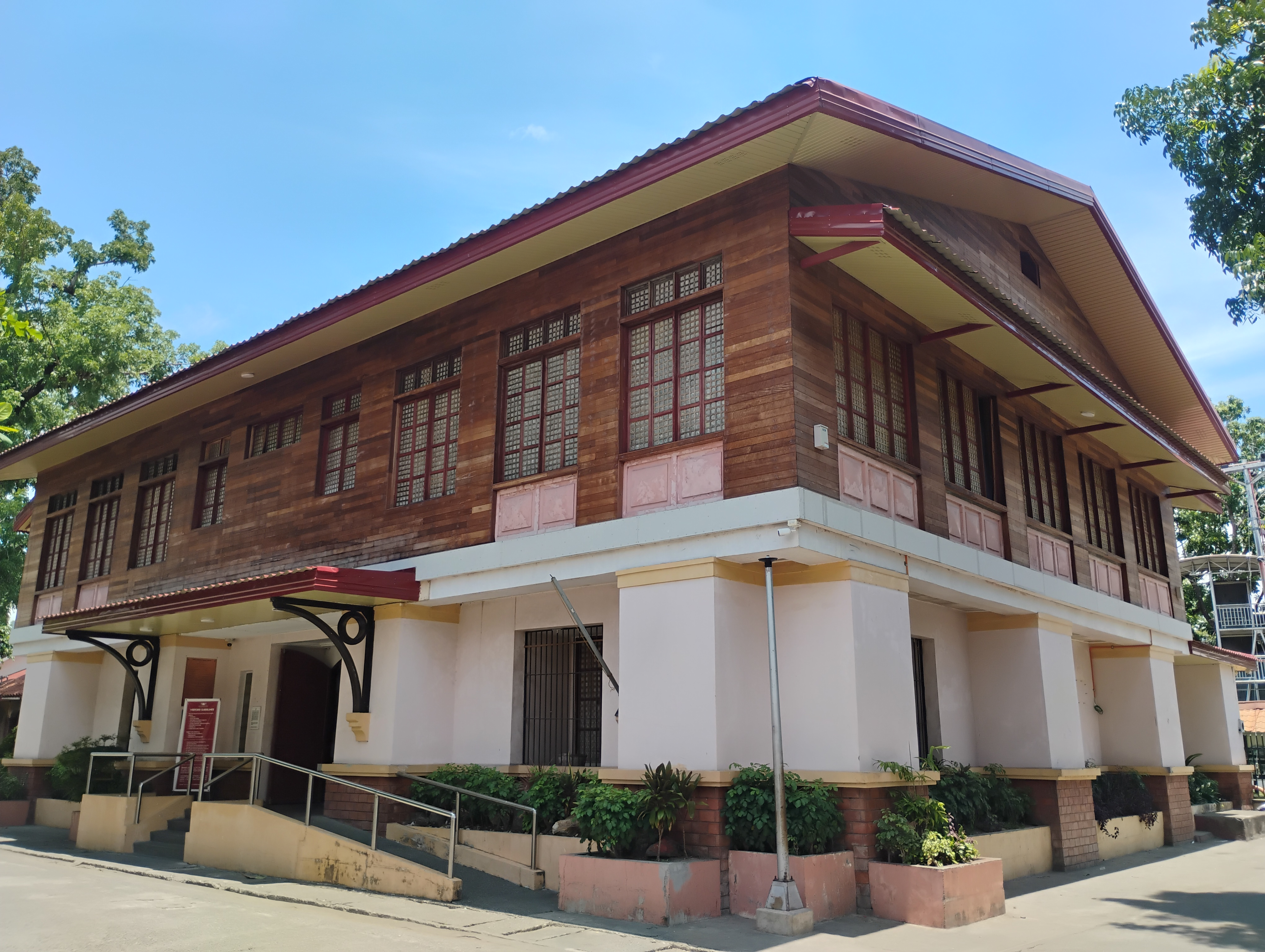
- Bayombong Cathedral Maharlika Highway along Bayombong Nueva Vizcaya People's Museum and Library

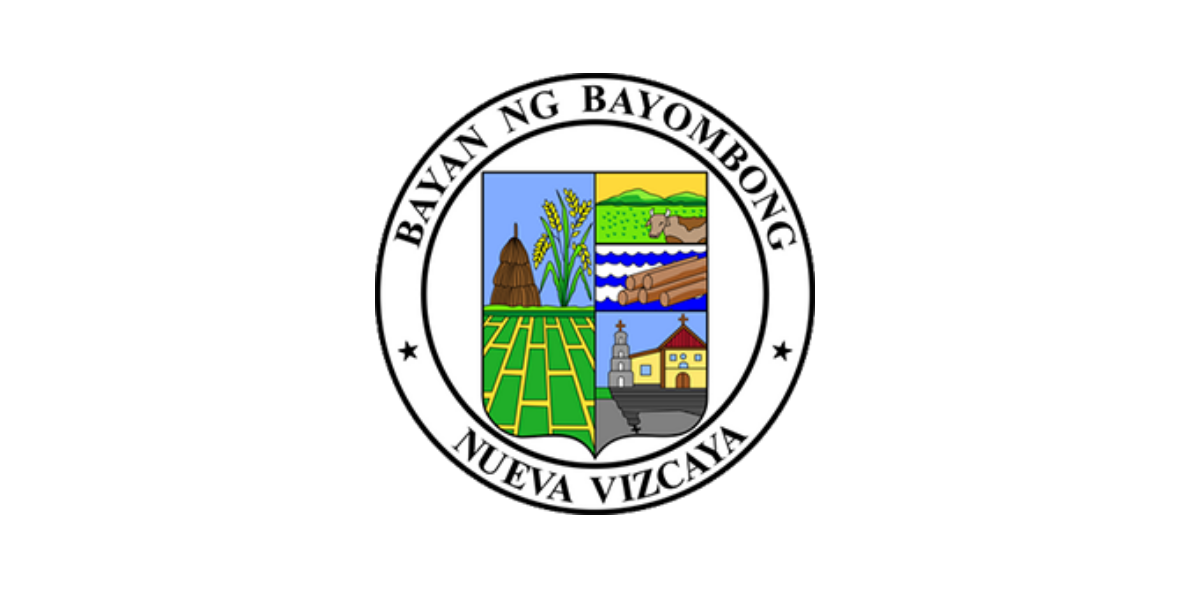
- Flag Seal

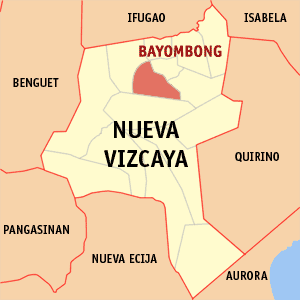
- Map of Nueva Vizcaya with Bayombong highlighted
- Interactive map of Bayombong
- Location within the Philippines
- Coordinates: 16°29′N 121°09′E
- Country: Philippines
- Region: Cagayan Valley
- Province: Nueva Vizcaya
- District: Lone district
- Founded: 12 June 1739
- Barangays: 25 (see Barangays)

Government
  - Type: Sangguniang Bayan
  - Mayor: Antonio Sergio G. Bagasao
  - Vice Mayor: Ramon T. Cabauatan
  - Representative: Timothy Joseph Cayton (Aksyon)
  - Municipal Council: Members: Elizabeth B. Tugab; Prescilla O. Marcos; George V. Burton; Edna G. Esteban; Ronald Allan A. Barnacha; Nicomedes M. Palparan; Cristina L. Soriano; Elmer J. Villanueva
  - Electorate: 40,264 voters (2025)

Area
  - Total: 163.36 km^{2} (63.07 sq mi)
- Elevation: 342 m (1,122 ft)
- Highest elevation: 770 m (2,530 ft)
- Lowest elevation: 254 m (833 ft)

Population (2024 census)
  - Total: 72,890
  - Density: 446.2/km^{2} (1,156/sq mi)
  - Households: 18,012

Economy
  - Income class: 1st municipal income class
  - Poverty incidence: 4.72% (2023)
  - Revenue: ₱ 347 million (2024)
  - Assets: ₱ 737.3 million (2024)
  - Expenditure: ₱ 262.4 million (2024)
  - Liabilities: ₱ 149.5 million (2024)

Service provider
  - Electricity: Nueva Vizcaya Electric Cooperative (NUVELCO)
- Time zone: UTC+8 (PST)
- ZIP code: 3700
- PSGC: 0205005000
- IDD : area code: +63 (0)78
- Native languages: Gaddang; Ilocano; Tagalog
- Website: nuevavizcaya.gov.ph/bayombong/

Bayombong, officially the Municipality of Bayombong (Gaddang: Ili na Bayombong; Ilocano: Ili ti Bayombong; Tagalog: Bayan ng Bayombong), is a municipality and capital of the province of Nueva Vizcaya, Philippines. According to the 2024 census, it has a population of 72,890 people.

Bayombong is the seat of the provincial capitol and the most populous town of Nueva Vizcaya. The name Bayombong emanated from the Gaddang word “Bayongyong” which means the confluence of two or more rivers. It has been reported that a certain tribe arrived and tried to invade the place, which caused the outbreak of the first tribal war in the area. The site was renamed “Bayumbung” as a sign of the Gaddangs' first victory in fighting for their private domains.

== Etymology ==
The Gaddang phrase "Bayongyong," which denotes the confluence of two prominent rivers, is where the name Bayombong originated. According to a different interpretation, "bayongyong" refers to a bamboo pole approximately 2 meters long that is used to transport fresh water from wells constructed along riverbanks. When Spanish missionaries spotted the Gaddangs, they were forming long lines and carrying water-filled bamboo poles on their shoulders. When the friars asked about the bamboo water jugs, the carriers answered in unison with "Bayongyong." It was in 1739 when Spanish Augustinian Friars named the place "Bayumbung", which was later changed into Bayombong.

== History ==
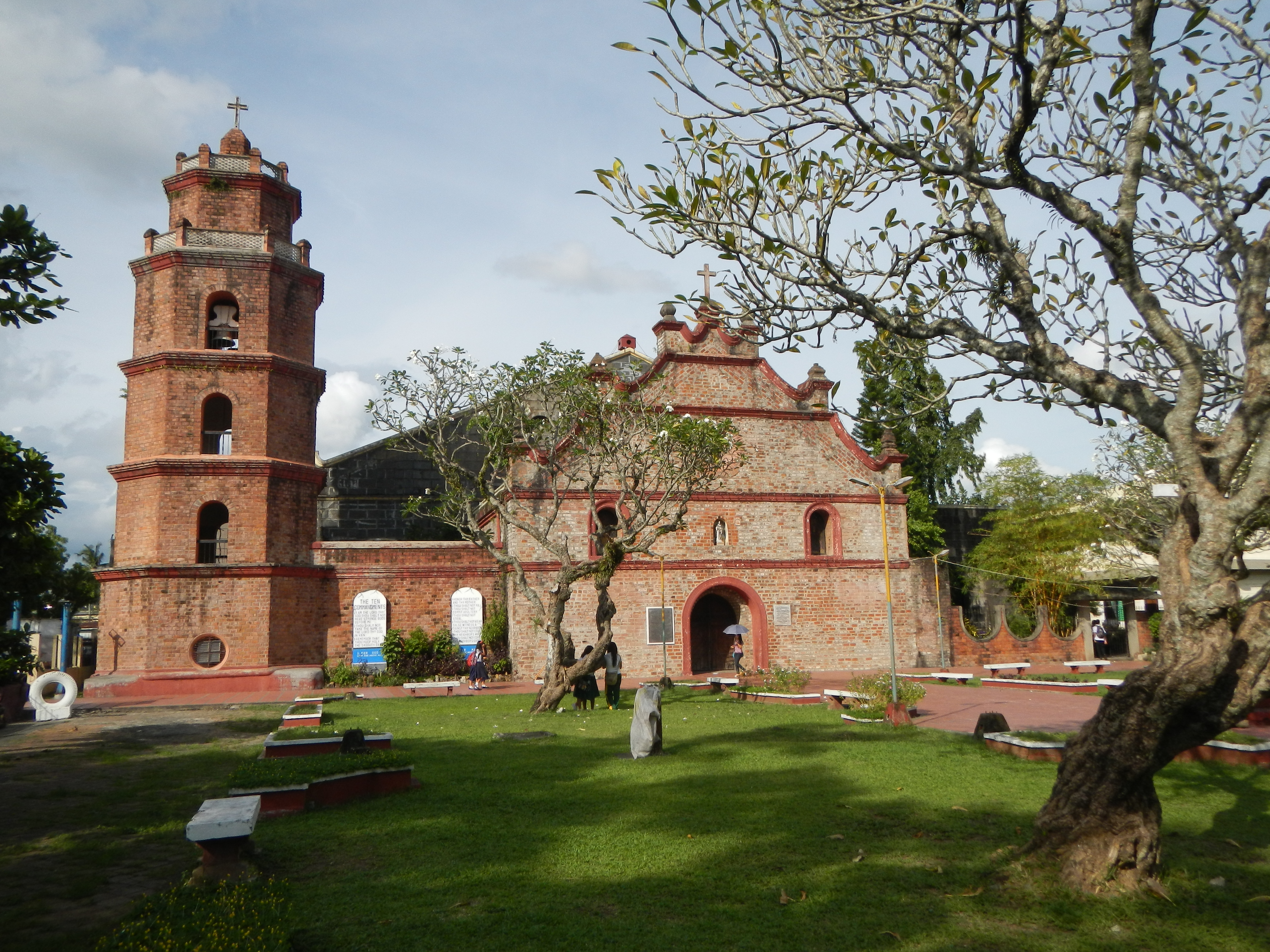
St. Dominic Cathedral

=== Early history ===
Bayombong is located in the southeastern portion of the current barangays of La Torre North and South, where the Magat River flows. Prior to Spanish colonization, the town was inhabited by the Ifugaos and Gaddangs.

=== Spanish era ===
Around 1718 there were tribal clashes between the Ifugaos, the Gaddangs and the Maalats from Isabela, with the Gaddangs gaining the upper hand and displacing the other tribes.

Bayombong was formally founded on April 12, 1739, during the first Catholic mass celebrated in the region, officiated by Father Pedro Freire in a makeshift chapel at the foot of the Bangan Hill. Bayombong came under the administration of Dominican friars as a part of the Paniqui mission a few months after its founding. The pueblo census of 1747 records 470 residents. The names of those considered to be founding fathers of Bayombong were Ramon Cabauatan, Jacinto Gadingan, Vicente Saquing, Ignacio Abuag, Mariano Danao, Domingo Bayaua, a certain Bincatan and a certain Mamuric. All of them were Gaddangs. Their names are remembered today in major streets of the town.

In 1754, the local government was formally organized. A Capitan del Pueblo was appointed as the chief executive. In 1982, the town became the seat of the new Diocese of Bayombong.

From 1773 to 1792, Fray Juan Crespo constructed the brick St. Dominic's church, the convent, and the cemetery next to the church, and started the octagonal tower. By 1829, Fray Juan Molano finished the tower. In 1880 the church building was damaged in an earthquake, while in 1987, a fire destroyed the church and convent. During the 1990 Luzon earthquake, the church belfry collapsed.

In 1789, the title of the chief executive was changed to Gobernadorcillo. In 1893, the title was changed to Capitan Municipal. During the revolutionary government in 1898, the Presidente Local was chief executive of the town but this was again changed to Mayor in 1937 as per provision of the Commonwealth Constitution.

Bayombong became the provincial capital of Nueva Vizcaya in 1856, when the old capital of Camarag (now Echague) became part of the newly-established province of Isabela.

=== American era ===
On November 28, 1899, during the Philippine–American War, General Fernando Canon surrendered his 300-man battalion, plus 139 Spanish and 14 American prisoners, to 2nd Lt. James N. Munro's 53 men of the 4th Cavalry. Included in the release were William Rynders and Orrison Woodbury, captured with the rest of Lt. Gillmore's men during the Siege of Baler.

In 1916, the American administration started a farm settlement school in Bayombong. In 1918, a high-school curriculum was added, and the school was named Bayombong Rural School.

In 1928, Father de Gryse started St. Mary's, a Catholic elementary school. In 1930, Bayombong Rural School was re-purposed as Nueva Vizcaya Rural High School (NVRHS), and in 1934 St. Mary's added a high-school department.

During World War II, the Japanese invaded the Philippines and turned Bayombong into a hub for sexual slavery. A "comfort station" was built by the Japanese in the town, where young girls and teenagers were forced to become sex slaves called "comfort women", and routinely gang-raped, brutalized, humiliated, and murdered by Japanese soldiers for entertainment.

During the Philippines campaign of 1945, Japanese Army barracks located in Bayombong became the target of U.S. bombing runs. The town was finally liberated on June 9, 1945 by U.S. forces of the 37th Infantry Division under Major General Robert S. Beightler.

=== Post-independence ===
In 1947, the St. Mary's College (now St. Mary's University) was established by the CICM near the elementary and high-schools of the same name. In 1956, NVRHS was converted into two programs: Nueva Vizcaya General Comprehensive High School and Nueva Vizcaya National Agricultural School.

In 1964 the agricultural school became Nueva Vizcaya Agricultural College, then in 1973 became the Nueva Vizcaya State Institute of Technology. Presently, the school is the Nueva Vizcaya State University.

== Geography ==
The terrain is mountainous dominated by steep hills and mountains encompassing an area of 36.44% of its total land area. The percentage which is level to gently sloping consists of 32.03% of the total area, rolling to hilly consists of 8.09%, while the remaining 23.44% consists of very steep mountains. The town was founded at the juncture of the Calocool and Magat Rivers, and has grown to incorporate the Pan-Philippine Highway.

Bayombong is situated 293.73 kilometres (182.52 mi) from the country's capital city of Manila.

=== Barangays ===
Bayombong is politically subdivided into 25 barangays. Each barangay consists of puroks and some have sitios.

- Bonfal East
- Bonfal Proper
- Bonfal West
- Buenavista (Vista Hills)
- Busilac
- Casat
- La Torre North
- Magapuy
- Magsaysay
- Masoc
- Paitan
- Don Domingo Maddela (Poblacion)
- Don Tomas Maddela (Poblacion)
- Don Mariano Marcos
- District IV (Poblacion)
- Bansing
- Cabuaan
- Don Mariano Perez
- Ipil-Cuneg
- La Torre South
- Luyang
- Salvacion
- San Nicolas
- Santa Rosa
- Vista Alegre (B. Baringin)

=== Climate ===
Climate data for Bayombong, Nueva Vizcaya
Month	Jan	Feb	Mar	Apr	May	Jun	Jul	Aug	Sep	Oct	Nov	Dec	Year
Mean daily maximum °C (°F)	27 (81)	28 (82)	30 (86)	31 (88)	31 (88)	30 (86)	29 (84)	28 (82)	29 (84)	29 (84)	29 (84)	27 (81)	29 (84)
Mean daily minimum °C (°F)	18 (64)	19 (66)	20 (68)	22 (72)	24 (75)	24 (75)	24 (75)	24 (75)	23 (73)	22 (72)	20 (68)	19 (66)	22 (71)
Average precipitation mm (inches)	21 (0.8)	28 (1.1)	34 (1.3)	58 (2.3)	160 (6.3)	179 (7.0)	226 (8.9)	225 (8.9)	215 (8.5)	168 (6.6)	59 (2.3)	32 (1.3)	1,405 (55.3)
Average rainy days	7.5	8.5	10.9	14.9	23.9	25.7	26.7	25.3	24.9	18.6	11.8	8.9	207.6
Source: Meteoblue

== Demographics ==
Population census of Bayombong

Year	Pop.	±% p.a.
1903	4,039	—
1918	5,661	+2.28%
1939	12,146	+3.70%
1948	14,078	+1.65%
1960	17,499	+1.83%
1970	25,212	+3.71%
1975	27,987	+2.12%
1980	32,066	+2.76%

Year	Pop.	±% p.a.
1990	39,886	+2.21%
1995	46,315	+2.84%
2000	50,563	+1.90%
2007	54,417	+1.02%
2010	57,416	+1.97%
2015	61,512	+1.32%
2020	67,714	+2.04%
2024	72,890	+1.78%

Source: Philippine Statistics Authority

=== Language ===
Ilocano, Bontoc, Gaddang, Ifugao, Isinay, Tagalog, and English are used always in Bayombong's schools, markets, and places of worship but in public schools they also use Ilocano.

== Economy ==
Poverty incidence of Bayombong (%)

Source: Philippine Statistics Authority

=== Tourism ===
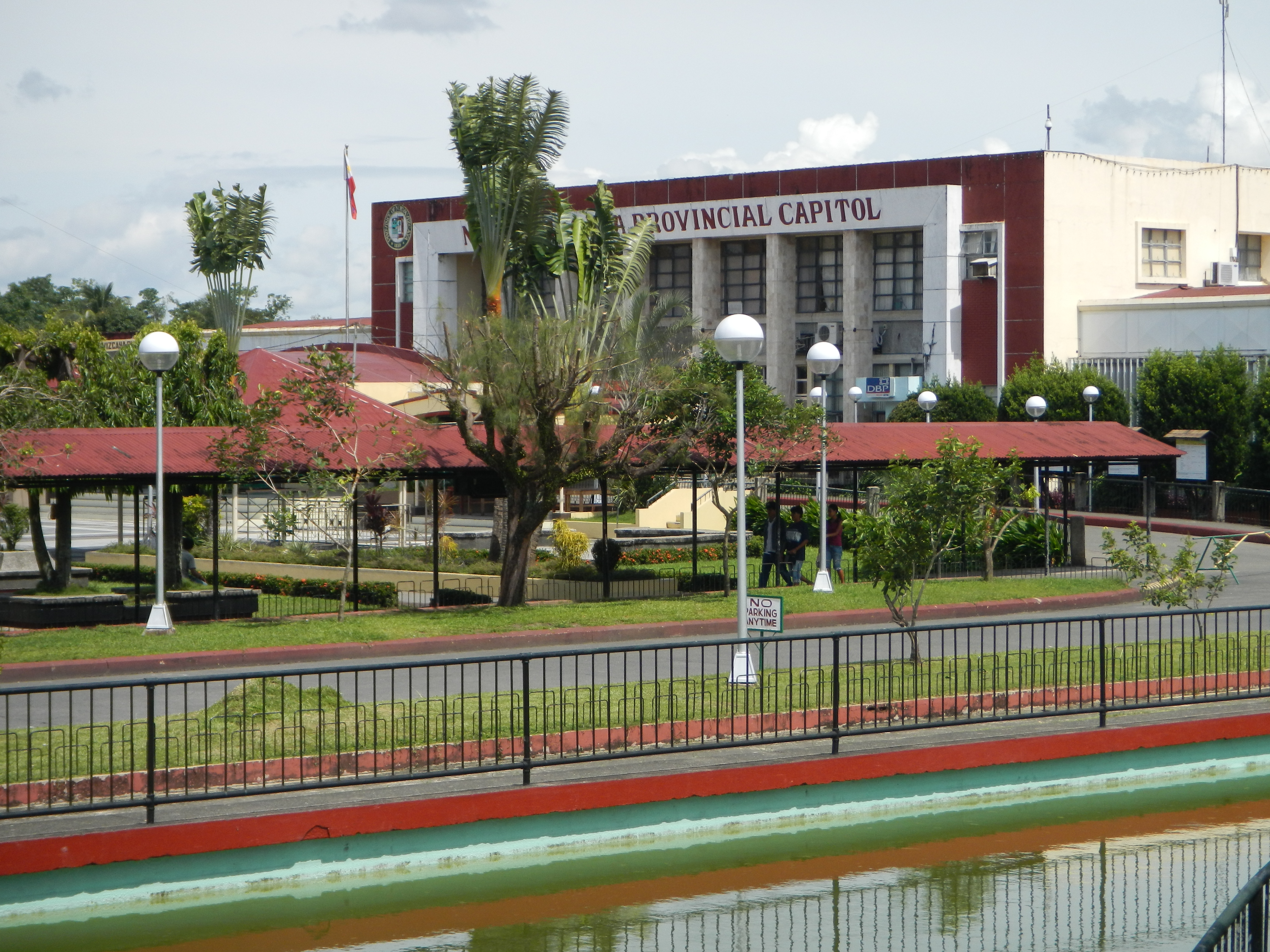
Capitol Park with the Nueva Vizcaya Capitol in the background

- Capitol Park – It is considered the "Luneta of the North". This 8-hectare park is carpeted with green grass and elegantly landscaped. It has a boating lagoon, fountain and wishing well, picnic huts, and sports facilities. It also has painting murals depicting some significant legends, the indigenous tribes, and major attractions of the province.
- Bangan Hill National Park – A historic landmark and cultural treasure. It is the site of the annual "Stations of the Cross" staged by the local Catholic church during the Lenten season using live actors depicting the last moments leading to Jesus Christ's crucifixion.
- Bayombong Children's Park – located at the heart of the town and is a good playground for children. It is equipped with swings, slides, etc.
- Bayombong Cathedral - It is located at the heart of the town and boasts of having the best-sounding church bells in the country. The structure is made of bricks and rare church antiques.
- The People's Museum and Library – This two-story historical building, where the provincial government was formerly seated, is now housing the Novo Vizcayano history
- Rizal Shrine – located at Barangay Casat, Bayombong.
- Bansing or Ammococan Falls – Located at Barangay Bansing, Bayombong, Nueva Vizcaya.
- Magat River - with a total length of 226 kilometres (140 mi) It is the largest tributary of the Cagayan River by discharge volume of water, with an estimated drainage area of 5,200 square kilometres
- Paitan Flower Farm- a flower farm of various flowers specially Sun flower
- Perante Farm - Home of the Perante Oranges - solidifying Nueva Vizcaya as the Citrus Capital of the Philippines
- Banaue Mountain Resort - Tam-An Mountain Resort
- Mount Palali Panorama - Zen's Hotel & Resort Mountain View
- Boy's Scout of the Philippines Camp Ground - Masoc.
- Franciscan Sisters Convent (SFIC) Historical Heritage Building - Lunduyan

== Government ==
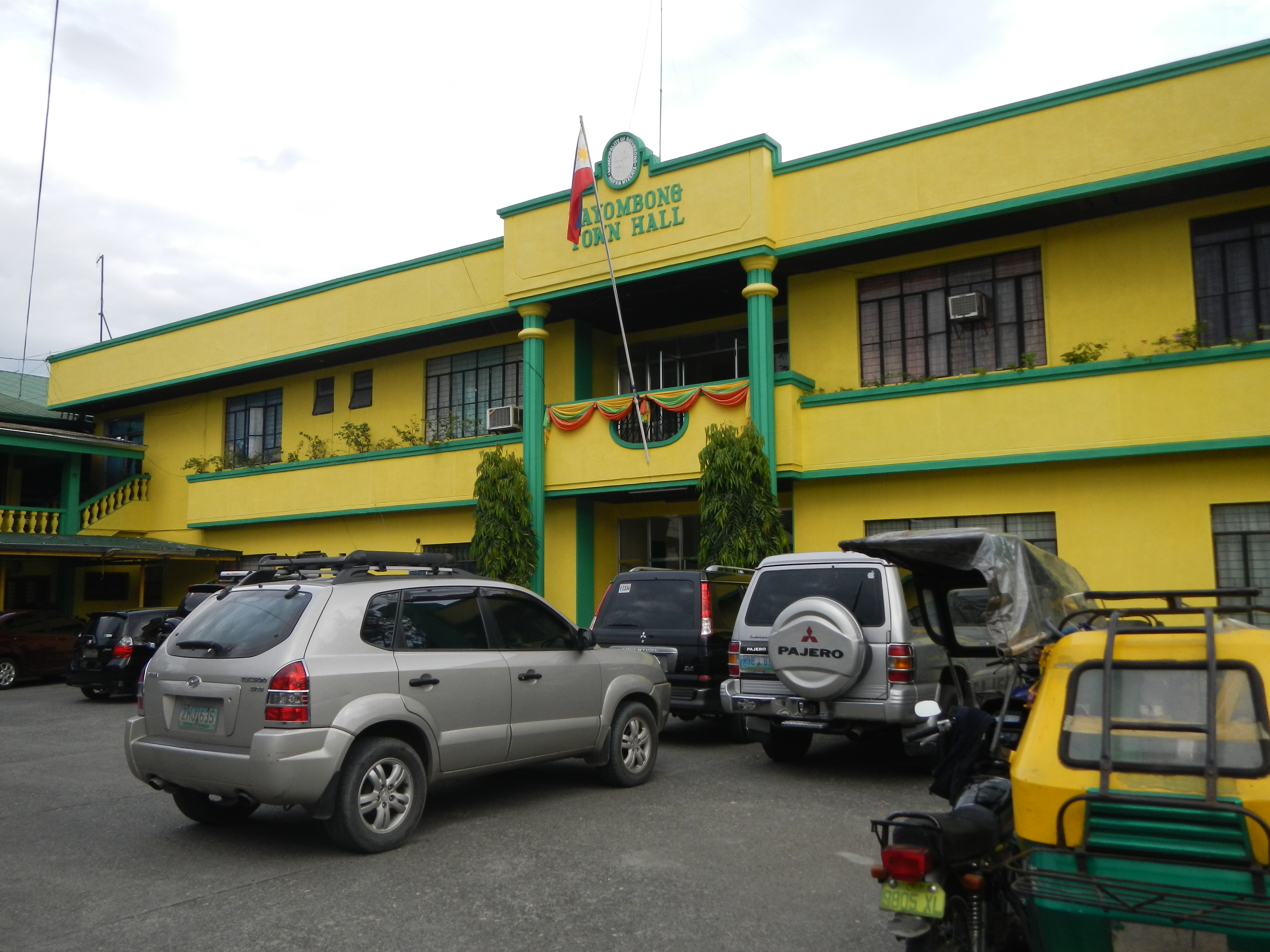
Bayombong Municipal Hall

=== Local government ===
Bayombong is part of the lone congressional district of the province of Nueva Vizcaya. It is governed by a mayor, designated as its local chief executive, and by a municipal council as its legislative body in accordance with the Local Government Code. The mayor, vice mayor, and most of the councilors are elected directly in polls held every three years.

=== Elected officials ===
Members of the Municipal Council (2022-2025)
Position	Name
Mayor	Antonio Sergio G. Bagasao
Vice-Mayor	Ramon T. Cabauatan
Councilors	George V. Burton
Councilors	Ronald Allan A. Barnacha
Councilors	Nicomedes M. Palparan
Councilors	Prescilla O. Marcos
Councilors	Magtanggol N. Lantion
Councilors	Cristina L. Soriano
Councilors	Benjamin L. Pagtulingan III
Councilors	Seth B. Navis
Councilors	Oliver G. Geronimo
Councilors	Noel John Carlo O. Gines
Councilors	Joseph B. Taeza

== Education ==
The Schools Division of Nueva Vizcaya governs the town's public education system. The division office is a field office of the DepEd in Cagayan Valley region. There are two schools district offices that govern all the public and private elementary and high schools throughout the municipality. These are Bayombong I District Office, and Bayombong II District Office.

=== Primary and elementary schools ===
- Ammococan Elementary School
- Bayfields School
- Bayombong Central School
- Bayombong South Elementary School
- Bonfal Annex Elementary School
- Bonfal Pilot Central School
- Busilac Elementary School
- Cabuaan elementary School
- Casat Day Care Center
- Casat Elementary School
- Holy Infant Childcare and Playhouse (Tutorial service)
- Ipil-Cuneg Elementary School
- Kingsway Christian Academy
- La Torre Elementary School
- Labbu Elementary School
- Lingay Elementary School
- Luyang Elementary School
- Magapuy Elementary School
- Masoc Elementary School
- Muir Woods Academy (Elementary) formerly known as Nueva Vizcaya Bright Child School
- Nueva Vizcaya State University Kidcare Learning Center
- Pawac Elementary School
- PLT Preschool Department
- Saint Mary's University Grade School
- Saint Mary's University Kindergarten
- Salvacion Daycare Center
- Santa Rosa Elementary School
- United Methodist Christian School

=== Secondary schools ===
- Bonfal National High School
- Casat National High School
- Muir Woods Academy (High School) formerly known as Nueva Vizcaya Bright Child School
- Nueva Vizcaya General Comprehensive High School
- Nueva Vizcaya State University, Laboratory School
- Paima National High School
- Philippine Science High School — Cagayan Valley Campus
- Saint Mary's University High School / Science High School

=== Technical and vocational schools ===
- Balasi-Secretario Training Center
- First Gateway Scholastic College
- Northern Luzon Technical Institute
- Our Lady of Peace and Good Voyage Institue of Technology Inc.
- Vizcaya Institute of Computer Science
- Vizcaya Prime Care

=== Higher educational institutions ===
- Nueva Vizcaya State University
- PLT College.
- Saint Mary's University
- Sierra College

== Notable personalities ==
- Roy Anthony Cutaran Bennett (1913–1990), editor of the Manila Bulletin who was tortured for his outspoken opposition to the Japanese occupation of the Philippines.
- Edith Lopez Tiempo, a National Artist of the Philippines in 1999

== Sister cities ==
- Gonohe, Aomori, Japan

== Media ==
=== AM ===
- 1233 kHz DWRV Radyo Veritas

=== FM ===
- 90.1 MHz DZRV Spirit FM
- 93.3 MHz FMR Nueva Vizcaya
- 96.5 MHz DWNS UFM
- 104.5 MHz DWGL Radyo Natin
- 107.7 MHz DWFF Bandera News
