= Nueva Vizcaya State University =

Public university in Nueva Vizcaya, Philippines

- Type: State university
- Established: 1916
- President: Wilfredo A. Dumale Jr.
- Vice-president: Elma P. Apostol, Academic Affairs; Jonar I. Yago., Research, Extension and Training; Cristina R. Salvosa, Administration and Finance; Carlo F. Vadil, Planning, Development and Information System
- Location: Bayombong, Nueva Vizcaya, Philippines; 16°28′48″N 121°08′43″E
- Campus: Bayombong (Main campus); Bambang
- Colours: Green and Gold
- Website: www.nvsu.edu.ph
- Location in Luzon Location in the Philippines

Nueva Vizcaya State University is a public university in the Philippines. It is mandated to provide advanced instruction and professional training in agriculture, arts, science, technology, education and other related fields. It is also mandated to undertake research and extension services, and provide progressive leadership in its area of specialization. Its main campus is located in Bayombong, Nueva Vizcaya, Philippines.

== Description ==
Established in 1916, Nueva Vizcaya State University is a non-profit public higher education institution located in the urban setting of the medium-sized town of Bayombong (population range of 10,000-49,999 inhabitants), Cagayan Valley. This institution has also branch campuses in the following location(s): Bambang. Officially accredited and/or recognized by the Commission on Higher Education, Philippines, Nueva Vizcaya State University (NSVU) is a medium-sized (uniRank enrollment range: 8,000-8,999 students) coeducational higher education institution. Nueva Vizcaya State University (NSVU) offers courses and programs leading to officially recognized higher education degrees such as pre-bachelor's degrees (i.e. certificates, diplomas, associate or foundation degrees), bachelor's degrees, master's degrees, doctorate degrees in several areas of study. This institution has a selective admission policy based on entrance examinations. International applicants are eligible to apply for enrollment. NSVU provides several academic and non-academic facilities and services to students including a library, housing, sport facilities and/or activities, financial aids and/or scholarships, study abroad and exchange programs, online courses and distance learning opportunities, as well as administrative services.

== History ==
Dr. Florentina S. Dumlao, the current NVSU President, assumed office on April 2, 2012 by virtue of BOR Res. No. 26, s. 2012.
