= Philippine Schools Debate Championship =

Annual English-language debate tournament

The Philippine Schools Debate Championship (PSDC) is an annual English-language debate tournament for high school-level teams from the Philippines. It is hosted by Ateneo de Manila University's Ateneo Debate Society (ADS) and its debates are conducted in the British Parliamentary Style. From its inception in 2002, it has become one of the two most prestigious Philippine national competitions for high school debaters, the other being the National Asians High School Debate Championship (NAsHDC) hosted by De La Salle University-Manila's La Salle Debate Society.

The Philippine Daily Inquirer became the primary sponsor of the tournament in 2003, at which point it was called the Inquirer-2bU! Interscholastic Debating Championship (IISDC). After the Inquirer ended its long-standing collaboration with the Ateneo Debate Society, the name reverted to PSDC in 2007. It is also regularly sponsored by the Konrad Adenauer Foundation. PSDC is the biggest Philippine high school debate championship, with 216 high school students joining from 25 institutions.

== Tournament format ==
PSDC debates are held in the British Parliamentary style. The tournament uses the Swiss system for deciding match-ups between competing teams in the preliminary rounds. The 32 highest scoring teams then advance (or "break") to the finals series, where the first and second placed teams in each round advance to the next highest levels of competition. A team cap (or limit on the number of breaking teams from one institution) of five teams is imposed.

In 2004, a regional championship for the PSDC was introduced, to give teams from outside Metro Manila more representation at the higher levels of competition. As these teams began to show in the regular break, this championship was discontinued.

An extemporaneous public speaking competition is also held alongside the debate rounds. This competition has its own preliminary, semifinal, and final rounds.

In 2008, a secondary tournament for the PSDC was introduced. Teams eligible for this final were those from institutions that never had a team in the final round of the PSDC. The round is a battle of the top four eligible teams. The final has been christened the Ana Alano Cup, in memory of the Ateneo debater who had died defending her father in a hit against him for attempting to expose a hospital corruption scandal.

Speakers from teams who have broken in the tournament are considered eligible to try out for a slot in the Philippine team to the World Schools Debating Championships.

There was no PSDC 2015 due to the academic calendar shift that occurred within Ateneo De Manila University.

== Past champions ==
Year	Champions	Team Members		Grand Finalists	Ana Alano Cup Champions	Team Members		Grand Finalists
2002	Ateneo de Manila High School	Marco Villacorta	Michael Biscocho	Ateneo De Manila High School (Leloy Claudio, Glenn Tuazon), Assumption College (Faith Serrano and Grace Serrano), Immaculate Conception Academy (Charisse Borromeo, Kristel Tiu)				
2003	Philippine Science High School - Main Campus	Anna Santos	Juanchi Pablo	Ateneo De Manila High School (Miko Biscocho, Adrian Mundin), Miriam College (Liz Diaz, Bea Lacson), Immaculate Conception Academy (Charisse Borromeo, Larissa Co)				
2004	Ateneo de Manila High School	Michael Biscocho	Adrian Mundin	Immaculate Conception Academy (Jennifer Ong, Krisha Borromeo), University of Santo Tomas (Richard Beltran, Jaime Pring), University of Santo Tomas (Joanna Mutiangpili, Rhea)				
2005	Immaculate Conception Academy	Jennifer Ong	Krisha Borromeo	Ateneo De Manila High School (James Soriano, Carlo Felizardo), Miriam College (Gica Mangahas Arcellana), Miriam College (Carla Sia, Jasmine Cruz)				
2006	Miriam College High School	Angelica Mangahas	Carla Sia	Xavier School (Peterson Poon, Patrick Cocabo), Immaculate Conception Academy (Ces Gotamco, Peidi Lee), Claret School Of Quezon City (Alistair Zosa, Gemmo Fernandez)				
2007	Xavier School	Evan Chen	Peterson Poon	Ateneo De Manila High School (James Soriano, Hansky Santos), Xavier School (Gabriel (Gavin) Kho, Kenneth Reyes), Miriam College High School (Valeri Inting, Pia Ranada)				
2008	Colegio San Agustin-Makati	Joshua Lim	Allan Cabrera	Ateneo De Manila High School (Jovin Pizarro, Ben Bismark), PAREF Woodrose School (Mica Reyes, Nikki Cone), PAREF Woodrose School (Tabby Abela, Pat Austria)	La Salle Green Hills	Brian Llamanzares	Daryl Isla	
2009	Ateneo de Manila High School	Henry Fernando	Bas Claudio	Immaculate Conception Academy (Jeanina Tee, Tiffany Uy), PAREF Southridge School (Justin Jabines, Marty Gonzaga), Ateneo De Zamboanga High School (Sanjeev Parmanand, Abbo Hernandez)	Silliman University	Julius Ragay	Jay Anderson	
2010	Ateneo de Manila High School	Jovin Pizarro	Bas Claudio	Immaculate Conception Academy (Tiffany Uy/Joan Ongchoco), PAREF Southridge School (Lance Katigbak, Pempen Chiang), Immaculate Conception Academy (Mary Or, Andrea Cuartero)	San Beda College Alabang	Katherine Peralta	Adolfo Jose Montesa	
2011	Immaculate Conception Academy	Joan Ongchoco	Denise Recomono	PAREF Southridge School (JV Valerio, Raffy Tanpho), Ateneo De Zamboanga University (Sanjeev Parmanand, Abbo Hernandez), Xavier School (Donald Felbaum, Nico Flaminano)	PAREF Springdale School	Miko Alazas	Ralph Gonzales	
2012	Xavier School	Donald Felbaum	Raynard Lao	Ateneo de Manila High School (Vitto Pavia, Kiko Santos), Miriam College High School (Amaris Pulido, Alex Agcaoili), Xavier School (Marc Matsubara, David Gozali)	La Salle Green Hills	Andrew Escay	Patrick Kahn	
2013	Immaculate Conception Academy	Vanessa Siy Van	Katrina Chan	San Beda College Alabang High School (Carlos Peñas, Kyle Atega), Ateneo de Manila High School (Jim Bulan, Miguel Ventura), PAREF Woodrose School (Jazmin Jabines, Cathy Cano)	St. Scholastica's College Manila	Nicole Tomas	Marty Ysaac	
2014	Immaculate Conception Academy	Abigail Yu	Clarice Tee	Ateneo De Manila High School (Rafa Lapira, France Santos), Ateneo De Manila High School (Adrian Padilla, Renz Reyes), Miriam College High School (Annika Bautista, Alex Agcaoili)	Mandaue City Science High School	Ejay Co	Jeremiah Valero	
2016	Xavier School	Matthew Araneta	Ignacio Villareal	Ateneo de Manila High School (Renz Reyes, Luigi Alcañeses), Xavier School (Jacob Wee, Alfonso Tan III), Xavier School (Jaime Siy, Steven Sy)	Assumption College	Lexi Lagamon	Stefi Alabastro	
2017	Xavier School	Ignacio Villareal	Jacob Wee	Xavier School (Steven Sy, Jaime Siy), International School Manila (Abhishek Kottamasu, Abhinav Bathula), Ateneo de Manila Senior High School (Mikko Vitug, Nicole Masagca)	University of San Jose–Recoletos	Soccoro Ogan	Kristoffer Francis Milan	La Salle Greenhills (Zhangyi Fan, Ethan Floro), Ateneo de Zamboanga University Senior High School (Najwa I. Unga, Therese Nyah Janel C. Sampang), Saint Scholastica's College (Tonie Peralta, Charlene Enriquez)
2018	PAREF Southridge School	Jake Consing	Luis Garcia	Xavier School (Steven Sy, Jaime Siy), Ateneo de Manila Senior High School (Mikko Vitug, Hans Gonzalez), Ateneo de Manila Senior High School (Matti Tan, Julia Ocoma)	University of the Immaculate Conception	Raven Castañeda	Enrico David	
2019	De La Salle University - Senior High School	Tonie Peralta	Kay Sison	Ateneo de Manila University Senior High School (Chris Carlos, David Africa), De La Salle Zobel (Quintin Chua, Ken Alunan), Xavier School (Eaton Sia, Luke de Ocampo)	University of Santo Tomas Senior High School	Redd Alli	Carl Escobar	Ateneo de Zamboanga Senior High School (Aisha Said, Gerald Ace Wace), De La Salle University Senior High School (Dorothy Tuazon, Mitzi Lanado), Ateneo de Naga University Senior High School (Jerwin Roy Villacruz, Joemar Valenzuela)
2020	Philippine Science High School – Cordillera Administrative Region Campus	Toby Leung	Mikaela Alvear	Ateneo de Manila University Senior High School (Marc Marquez, Michael Ocampo), PAREF Southridge School (Jake Peralta, Luis Garcia), De La Salle University – Senior High School (Ichiro Arbole, Kay Sison)	Ateneo de Naga University Senior High School	Sophia Abejero	Janielle Sanchez	University of San Jose Recoletos (Kirby Alex Millan, Ashley Marie Mandal), Saint Paul College Pasig (Luna Yael B. Inventor, Gabriella Maria E. Villarama), Philippine Science High School Main Campus (Timothy I. Javier, Hugh Ruzle E. Mejos)
2021	Philippine Science High School – Cordillera Administrative Region Campus	Toby Leung	Joshua Daquipil	Ateneo de Manila University Senior High School (Jaime Castro, Michael Ocampo), Immaculate Conception Academy (Chanel Ang, Alex Ang), International School Manila (David Bloom, Zen Vaillancourt)	Ateneo de Zamboanga University Senior High School	Chris Jumamil	Andrea Peñaflor	Ilocos Norte College of Arts and Trades (Oarben Balicoco, Ethel Candelasa), Saint Paul College Pasig (Rachelle Kasilag, Samantha Rosario), Ateneo de Davao University Senior High School (Jose Cinches, Andrew Tumulak)
2022	Philippine Science High School – Main Campus	Neil De Jesus	Ram Mayo	Ateneo de Manila University Senior High School (David Bejarin, Johann Bernardo), De La Salle Zobel (Paris Pineda, Clarisse Tan), Philippine Science High School – Main Campus (David Mencias, Hugh Mejos)	Ateneo de Naga University Senior High School	Alyssa Peyra	Yeshua M. Celebrado	Philippine Science High School - Main Campus (Jerd Mark Carlos, Hanz Isaac Arnaldo), La Salle Green Hills (Cresmanuel V. Quimbo, Carl Geevee D. Vitug), Philippine Science High School - Main Campus (Mathew Serna, Alistair Jon D. Quintanilla)
2023	Philippine Science High School – Main Campus	Hugh Mejos	Marcus Pascual	Ateneo de Manila University Senior High School (Jasmin Ang, Aliyah Herlihy), De La Salle Zobel (Clarisse Tan, Leonna Ronquillo), The British School Manila (Tyrone Serapio, Caitlin Gaw)	Ateneo de Zamboanga University Junior High School	Aidin Alamia	Katrina Tan	Ateneo de Davao University Senior High School (Feona Margarette C. Balansag, Christine D. Sintos), Philippine Science High School – ZRC (Leila Loraine M. Adelante, Joshua Nathan L. Punsalan), University of Santo Tomas Senior High School (Diana Margo C. Digal, Maritoni Jean Lumban Caridad)
2024	Ateneo de Manila Senior High School	Sam Tango	Arles Kiel Mirandilla	Immaculate Conception Academy (Cara Reyes/Robyn Montano), Philippine Science High School Main Campus (Aydan Gabriel A.Ables/Lorenzo Franco D. Kasilag), PAREF Southridge School (Geoff Biscocho, Jacob Ty)	University of Saint Anthony	Alaissa Angela Nolasco	Nikailla Chelsea Sarmiento	Ateneo de Naga University (Jerard Benedick O. Caguicla, Mary Catherine Marco), Quezon Science High School (Jellyn R. Alindogan, Noel R. Elivera Jr.), Philippine Science High School – CMC (Aneeqa Jasrah P. Unda, Stanley King Saavedra)
2025	De La Salle University - Senior High School	Vivienne Tai Chan	Kara Porciuncula	Xavier School San Juan (Tyler Lim, Jack Lim), Philippine Science High School Main Campus (Yakov Apura, Franco Kasilag), Paref Southridge (Jacob Ty, Geoff Biscocho)	Homeschool Global	Ashley (James) Vega	DJ Salud	Philippine Science High School - Central Visayas Campus (Leia Yzabel Y. Monteclar, Romel Isaiah I. Tala) Philippine Science High School - Central Visayas Campus (Haleigh Kjyll Maglasang, Xzanthya Sharielle Florence Kho) Ateneo de Zamboanga University Junior High School (Anyssah S. Taytay, Sofia C. Tan)
2026	Immaculate Conception Academy A	Caitlin Tiu	Summer Beljot	Ateneo de Manila University Senior High School D (Mico Siosana, Chloe Magsalin), Miriam College High School A (Mary Dela Torre, Patrice Rane Chua), Homeschool Global A (Sofia Caraig, Kimberly Co)	Philippine Science High School - Caraga Region Campus A	Robert Espinar	Stacey Hurtado	Philippine Science High School - Caraga Region Campus B (Ysabo Beluan, Leanne Bajade), Miriam College High School B (Janelle Boco, Sophia Bautista) Silliman University AL (Lourd Anque, Raymond Lecraw)

== Past best speakers in debate and public speaking ==
Year	Best Speaker (Preliminary Debate Rounds)	Best Speaker (Debate Finals)	Best Speaker (Ana Maria Alano)	Best Speaker (Ana Maria Alano Finals)	Best Speaker (Public Speaking)
2002	Charisse Borromeo (Immaculate Conception Academy)				
2003	Charisse Borromeo (Immaculate Conception Academy)				Victor Tence (Southville International School)
2004	Michael Biscocho (Ateneo de Manila High School)				
2005	Angelica Mangahas (Miriam College High School)	Anna Arcellana (Miriam College High School)			
2006	Angelica Mangahas (Miriam College High School) and Peterson Poon (Xavier School)	Carla Sia (Miriam College High School)			Genica Endaluz (St. Theresa's College)
2007	Peterson Poon (Xavier School)	Peterson Poon (Xavier School)			Nicole Gaba (PAREF Woodrose School)
2008	Phillip Poon (Xavier School)	Allan Cabrera (Colegio San Agustin-Makati)			Mark Escay (La Salle Green Hills)
2009	Bas Claudio (Ateneo de Manila High School)	Henry Fernando (Ateneo de Manila High School)			Dwight Garvy Tan (Ateneo de Naga University)
2010	Tiffany Uy (Immaculate Conception Academy)	Tiffany Uy (Immaculate Conception Academy)			Mikey Onglao (PAREF Southridge School)
2011	Andrei Buendia (San Beda College Alabang)	Joan Ongchoco (Immaculate Conception Academy)			Raynard Lao (Xavier School)
2012	Miguel Ventura (Ateneo de Manila High School)	Donald Felbaum (Xavier School)			Kitkat Cuenca (PAREF Woodrose)
2013	Vanessa Siy Van and Abigail Yu (Immaculate Conception Academy)	Vanessa Siy Van (Immaculate Conception Academy)			
2014	Abigail Yu (Immaculate Conception Academy)	Abigail Yu (Immaculate Conception Academy)			
2016	Matthew Araneta (Xavier School)	Jacob Wee (Xavier School)			
2017	Ignacio Villareal (Xavier School)	Ignacio Villareal (Xavier School)			
2018	Mikko Vitug (Ateneo de Manila Senior High School)	Jake Consing (PAREF Southridge School)			
2019	Chris Carlos (Ateneo de Manila Senior High School)	Kay Sison (De La Salle Senior High School)			
2020	Toby Leung (Philippine Science High School – Cordillera Administrative Region Campus)	Toby Leung (Philippine Science High School – Cordillera Administrative Region Campus			
2021	Toby Leung (Philippine Science High School – Cordillera Administrative Region Campus)	David Bloom (International School Manila)			
2022	David Mencias (Philippine Science High School – Main Campus) Robyn Montano (Immaculate Conception Academy) Emilio Lorenzo (Paref Southridge) Lois Naomi Ang (Ateneo de Manila Senior High School)	Neil De Jesus (Philippine Science High School – Main Campus)			
2023	Clarisse Tan (De La Salle Santiago Zobel School)	Hugh Mejos (Philippine Science High School – Main Campus)		Aidin Alamia (Ateneo de Zamboanga University Junior High School)	
2024	Sam Tango (Ateneo de Manila Senior High School)	Sam Tango (Ateneo de Manila Senior High School)	Mika Bosano (Homeschool Global) Ramya Espiritu (St. Paul College Pasig)	Noel R. Elivera Jr. (Quezon Science High School )	
2025	Franco Kasilag (Philippine Science High School – Main Campus)	Kara Porciuncula (De La Salle University - Senior High School)	Ramya Espiritu (St. Paul College Pasig) Kimberly Co (Homeschool Global) Sofia Caraig (Homeschool Global)	Ashley (James) Vega (Homeschool Global)	
2026	Sofia Caraig (Homeschool Global) Yakov Apura(Philippine Science High School – Main Campus)	Caitlin Tiu (Immaculate Conception Academy)	Sofia Caraig (Homeschool Global)	Janelle Boco (Miriam College High School)	
