= Mandaue City College =

Public college in Mandaue, Philippines

- Kolehiyo sa Syudad sa Mandaue (Cebuano)
- Motto: "Your School, Your Second Home"
- Type: Government school
- Established: 2005
- Affiliations: Mandaue City Comprehensive National High School; Mandaue City's City Health, Sports Complex, Public Library and more establishments of the city
- Students: 6,000+ per Academic Year
- Location: Mandaue City Cultural and Sports Complex, Don Andres Soriano Ave., Centro, Mandaue City, Philippines; 10°19′24″N 123°56′28″E
- Hymn: Mandaue City College Hymn
- Colors: Apple Green, Bright Green, Yellow
- Location in the Visayas Location in the Philippines

The Mandaue City College (MCC) is a government-recognized higher education institution in Mandaue, Philippines, established for deserving students, mostly graduates from barangay high schools, who have no access to education in mainstream private colleges or universities. There is another school with duplicate name called Mandaue City College but is now known as Paulus Cañete College (MCC Basak), but it is not affiliated with this school.

This is the only CHED-accredited local government higher educational institution in the City of Mandaue.

== History ==
The school was established by the Local Government of Mandaue through Ordinance No. 10-2005-324A, enacted by the 10th Sangguniang Panlungsod on September 27, 2005. This ordinance was later revised on October 7, 2010, pursuant to SP Ordinance No. 12-2010-568.

== Programs ==
Program	Major
Bachelor of Arts (AB)	English, Political Science
Bachelor of Elementary Education (BEEd)	General Content, Pre-School Education, Special Education
Bachelor of Secondary Education (BSEd)	English, Filipino, Mathematics
Bachelor of Science in Business Administration (BSBA)	Human Resource Development and Management
Bachelor of Science in Public Administration (BSPA)	
Bachelor of Science in Hotel and Restaurant Management (BSHRM)	
Bachelor of Science in Tourism Management (BSTM)	
Bachelor of Science in Social Work (BSSW)	
Bachelor of Science in Information Technology (BSIT - InfoTech)	
Bachelor of Science in Industrial Technology (BSIT - InduTech)	Computer Technology, Automotive Technology, Drafting Technology, Electrical Technology, Electronics Technology
Diploma in Professional Education (DPE)	
Diploma in Pre-School Education (DPresEd)	
Diploma in Special Education (DSpEd)	
