= PSDC =

PSDC may refer to:

- Christian Social Democratic Party, former name of Christian Democracy (Brazil) (DC)
- Process Systems Design and Control Laboratory
- Philippine Schools Debate Championship
