= La Salle Green Hills =

Private school in Metro Manila, Philippines

Coordinates: 14°35′49.00″N 121°03′19.44″E

Location
- 343 Ortigas Avenue, Mandaluyong; Metro Manila Philippines

Information
- Type: Private, Catholic, non-stock, co-educational, basic education institution
- Motto: Ad Deum Per Fidem Mores Culturam (Latin); To God, through faith, virtue and culture
- Established: 1959; 67 years ago
- Founder: La Sallian Christian Brothers
- Oversight: De La Salle Brothers in the Philippines
- President: Brother Edmundo L. Fernandez FSC
- Principal: Carmela Boncodin
- Faculty: ~900
- Grades: Nursery, K to 12
- Enrollment: ~4807 as of July 19, 2025
- Campus: Urban, 6 hectares (60,000 m^{2})
- Colors: Green and White
- Mascot: The Green Archer (Note: The LSGH varsity team La Salle Greenies was taken from the, now defunct, De La Salle High School's varsity team De La Salle Greenies. Hence, the Green Archer, which was also the old mascot, is still the moniker of LSGH. (See Ateneo – La Salle rivalry for more information.))
- Accreditation: Level III PAASCU and FAAP
- Newspaper: Hasik, EPA Link GS; The Lazette, PALS.net HS
- Yearbook: Ranger GS; Scope HS
- Affiliations: DLSPI, EDSOR
- Alma Mater song: De La Salle Alma Mater Hymn
- Varsity Team: Greenies
- Athletic Association: NCAA
- Website: lsgh.edu.ph
- LSGH50 logo

La Salle Green Hills ("LSGH") is a private Catholic school run by the Philippine District of the Institute of the Brothers of the Christian Schools in Ortigas Avenue, Mandaluyong, Metro Manila, Philippines. It was established in 1959 by the De La Salle Brothers led by Brother H. Gabriel Connon, FSC primarily to provide more slots to students wishing to avail of the then very popular De La Salle primary education offered in Taft Avenue, Manila.

La Salle Green Hills offers primary and secondary education. It is a member of the De La Salle Philippines, the association of all Lasallian institutions in the Philippines, namely De La Salle University in Manila (1911), De La Salle Araneta University in Malabon (1946), University of St. La Salle in Bacolod (1952), and the La Salle Academy in Iligan (1958).

La Salle Green Hills was given a clean seven-year accreditation by the PAASCU in 1991 and 1998, thus making it the first high school institution in the Philippines with this distinction. Both Grade School and High School departments of La Salle Green Hills were awarded Level III accreditation—the highest possible level—by the PAASCU and FAAP.

== History ==
In the Early 1950s, the Brothers of De La Salle College-Manila led by Brother H. Gabriel Connon FSC, acquired a six hectare lot on Ortigas Avenue in Mandaluyong to relocate the De La Salle Novitiate from Baguio and to accommodate increasing requests for admission to the then De La Salle Grade School on Taft Avenue, Manila.

In July 1959, La Salle Green Hills (then spelled La Salle – Green Hills) opened its door to two preschool-level sections and one section each for elementary school units one and two. Its first Brother-Director was Brother Alphonsus Bloemen FSC who first came to teach in De La Salle College in Manila in 1940. On August 24, 1960, La Salle Green Hills, Inc. was registered as non-stock, non-profit corporation with the Securities and Exchange Commission. In August 1964, the high school was established. In 1968, when the De La Salle High School – Manila was made defunct, graduates of the De La Salle Grade School were transferred to the La Salle Green Hills High School, making La Salle Green Hills the high school of De La Salle University – Manila, until the establishment of the co-educational De La Salle-Santiago Zobel School in 1978. The De La Salle Grade School – Manila was phased-out in 1984, after which its grade school graduates were given an option to study either at LSGH (for northern and central Metro Manila residents) or at De La Salle Zobel in Ayala Alabang Village (for southern Metro Manila residents).

La Salle Green Hills was first accredited by the Philippine Accrediting Association of Schools, Colleges and Universities or PAASCU in 1971 and was given a three-year accrediting grant. La Salle Green Hills received three-year accreditations again in by 1974 and 1977. After which, La Salle Green Hills was given a better five-year grant in 1982 and 1987 after two accrediting visits. Accrediting visits in 1991 and 1998 were given seven-year accreditations making it the first and only high school in the Philippines to be granted two seven-year accreditations. After the seven-year accrediting grant that was given to La Salle Green Hills in 1998, the school was surveyed in September 2005 and was granted a five-year accreditation. In June 2008, the La Salle Green Hills Grade School was granted a Level III accreditation by PAASCU, making it the first and only school in the Philippines certified as such. And in late 2008, the High School was granted Level III accreditation from the Federation of Accrediting Agencies of the Philippines, the highest accreditation given to any basic education institution in the Philippines.

On June 8, 2009, La Salle Green Hills celebrated its golden jubilee, and in 2011 celebrated together with the rest of the De La Salle schools in the Philippines the centennial celebration of the De La Salle Brothers in the Philippines.

The school announced in May 2020, that it will begin admitting female students for senior high school. In March 2021, the school announced that it will begin admitting female students for all levels.

== Departments ==
=== Grade school ===
The La Salle Green Hills Grade School (LSGH-GS) is a Catholic elementary school. It offers education for students from the kindergarten level to the sixth grade. Its facilities and classrooms are located within the St. Joseph the Worker Building (Kindergarten and Grade 1), St. Brother Miguel Febres Cordero FSC building (Grade 2 to Grade 5), and the St. La Salle building (Grade 6). The Grade School shares the athletic facilities with the High School. The Grade School has the distinction of being the first grade school in the country to receive a Level III accreditation from the PAASCU.

The curriculum for the LSGH-GS focuses on basic elementary education, in which Language (English), Filipino, Christian Living, Science, Art, Music, Computer, and Arithmetic are introduced in Kindergarten 1 and 2. Language Arts, Science, Filipino, Music, Christian Living, Reading, Mathematics, Araling Panlipunan (Grade 2–6). Physical Education is taught in Grades 1–6. Students from Grade 5 and 6 (GS) get to pick their Friday Club from a list of multiple clubs.

=== High school ===
The La Salle Green Hills High School (LSGH-HS) is a Catholic secondary school that is divided into the Junior High School (Grades 7–10) and the Senior High School (Grades 11 and 12). Its Junior High School is located within the St. Brother Mutien Marie FSC building aside from the Arts and Technology classrooms which are located at the St. Benilde Gym's mezzanine, and the top floors of the St. Joseph the Worker building and Central House. Its Senior High School is located within the St. Brother Arnold Reche FSC and also houses related facilities. Previously an exclusive all-boys' school, its Senior High School opened to female students in 2020, then eventually to all levels in 2021.

The curriculum of the LSGH-HS focuses mainly on college preparatory education in which English (Grammar, Literature, Rhetoric and Reading), Mathematics, Science, Social Science, Christian Living, and Filipino make up the academic subjects while Arts and Technology (includes Electronics, Home Management, Basic Accounting, Music, Drafting, Integrated Arts, Culinary Arts and Automotive), Computer, and Physical Education and Health, and Robotics make up the co-curricular subjects which are all taught from Grade 7 to Grade 10. The majority of graduates from the LSGH-HS move on to study college at De La Salle University Manila, De La Salle-College of Saint Benilde also in Manila, University of the Philippines, University of Santo Tomas, and Ateneo de Manila University.

== Campus ==
The school is situated on a six-hectare campus fronting Ortigas Avenue, across from Wack-Wack Village and golf course.

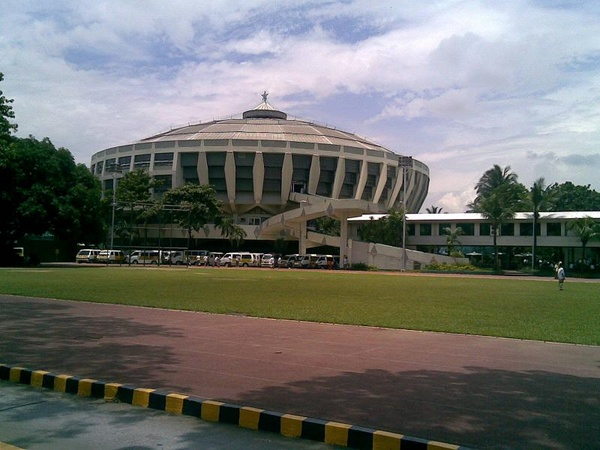
St. Benilde Gym, Baseball field, and Track Oval

=== St. Benilde Gym/cafeteria ===
Probably the most well-known building on the school grounds, construction of the dome-shaped structure began in 1967. Mr. Gines Rivera is the building's architect. It houses the main basketball courts on the second floor and the cafeteria on the ground floor. The mezzanine houses most of the Computer and Arts & Technology, Drafting and Culinary Arts classrooms of the La Salle Green Hills High School. Aside from sports, the main gym area is also used for graduations, community masses, concerts, and other events. Since 1986, it has been used as the venue for the presidential election ballot counting by NAMFREL.

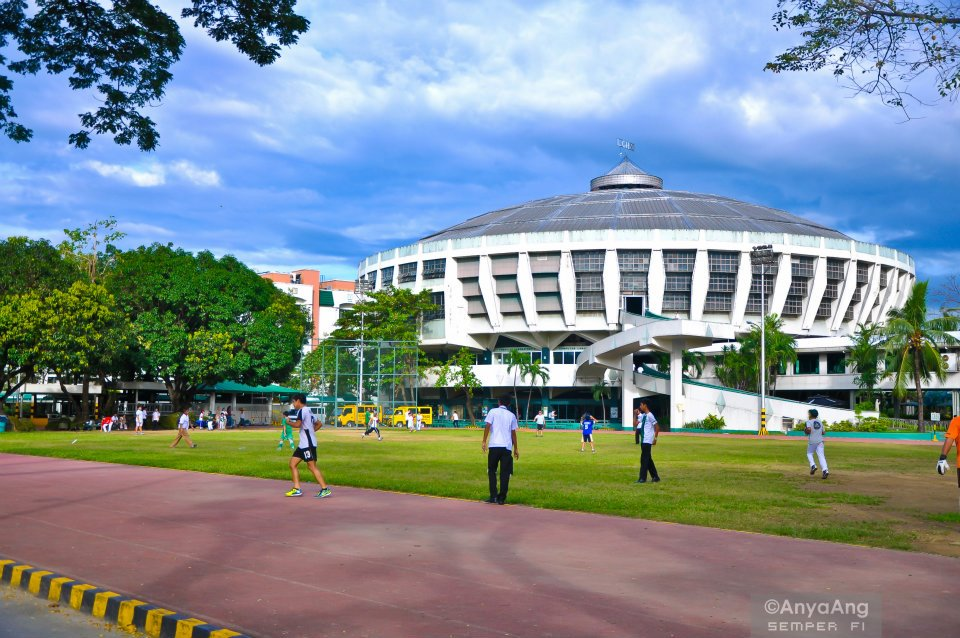
Photo by: Anya Ang (2011)

=== Classroom buildings ===
- Saint La Salle Building

The St. La Salle Building houses the Grade 6, some computer labs and many special classrooms, the Grades 2, 5 and 6 art and music rooms, the annex library, the accounting office, the Presidents' Office and the other canteen (Zaide).

The 3rd floor of the St. La Salle Building houses one of the four campuses of the De La Salle University Manila Ramon V. del Rosario Sr. Graduate School of Business, of which LSGH is designated as the "Ortigas Campus".

- Brother Arnold Reche FSC Building

The Brother Arnold Reche FSC Building houses the Senior High School (Grades 11 and 12) Department's classrooms. It also houses the Quadrangle 1, which is the school's garden. It has a library, chapel, clinic, the Senior High School guidance counselor's offices, the Senior High School science lab, the Senior High School's prefect offices and a staircase leading to the Father Martinez Activity Center, or FMAC.

- Saint Brother Miguel Febres Cordero FSC Building

The building is located behind the St. La Salle Main Building, and houses the Grades 2–5, some of the Grade 6 classrooms and the Grade School Principal's office. It houses two music rooms, two activity rooms, a rehearsal room, and the LC3 Prefect's office. The basement floor of the building accommodates the SPDO, SC, The Archives, the conference room, and the Table Tennis courts. In the middle of it is called the Quadrangle 2.

- Saint Brother Mutien Marie FSC Building

The Saint Mutien Marie Building, or the High School Building, houses the Junior High School Department (Grades 7–10), from classrooms to the administration offices. The classrooms are organized with each year level occupying one level starting with the 7th on the second floor. The ground floor includes the HS library, administrative offices, the HS chapel, and the Maria Pilapil Hall.

- St. Joseph the Worker Building

The St. Joseph the Worker Building houses the students and faculty of the Kindergarten department and is divided into the Kinder 1 building and the Grade 1 building. The Kindergarten playground is also situated here.

=== Other buildings ===
- Central House

This was the first building in 1959. It was here that the first classes of LSGH were held. Today, it is the residence of the FSC Brothers of LSGH, this is more commonly known to the students as the "Brothers' House." The Central House also contains the offices of De La Salle Philippines. It is usually off-limits to all students except for the HS Science Laboratories on the fourth floor.

- Brother Rafael S. Donato FSC Center for the Performing Arts

The Brother Rafael S. Donato FSC Center for the Performing Arts (Br. Donato Center) is the home of both the grade school and high school theater arts departments of La Salle Green Hills. The former St. Joseph's Auditorium (SJA) underwent a complete renovation in 2004 and was renamed as the St. Joseph's Theater (SJT to the students). It was then dedicated in March 2007 to Brother Rafael Donato FSC, who died in Bagac, Bataan, on November 2, 2006, 2 weeks after his 50th anniversary as a De La Salle Brother. It has orchestra and balcony sections which can accommodate 628 persons and its newly installed lighting and sound systems make it the best-equipped medium-sized performing arts venue within the San Juan and Mandaluyong–Ortigas area.

This has also been the venue of productions by the Grade School's Junior Actors' Guild and the High School's Cue Drama Club. Cue Drama stages productions every year.

=== Sporting areas ===
- St. Benilde Gym
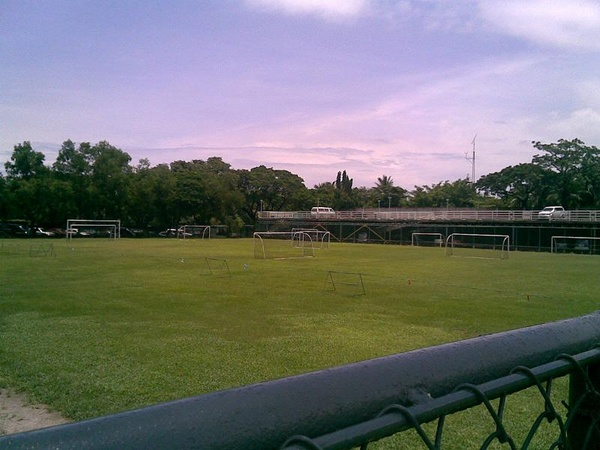
  The Brother Gilbert Cotter Field with the Steel Car Park (right)

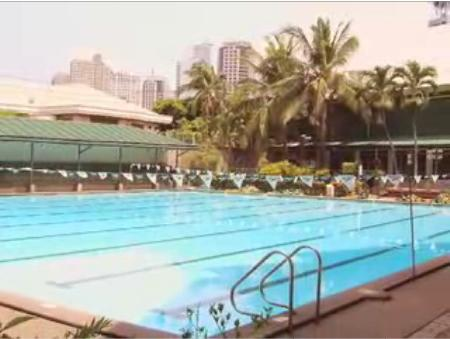
Swimming Pool with Ortigas Avenue skyline in the background

The St. Benilde Gymnasium, although called a gym, does not house an actual gym (unlike the one in the Father Martinez Activity Center, or FMAC), but houses basketball games and practices.

- Father Martinez Activity Center (FMAC)

The other gym is the Father Martinez Activity Center (FMAC). It is named after LSGH's rector in the late 1990s. (Note: As depicted on a plaque on the entrance of FMAC.) It has 4 basketball courts, one full court made of Taraflex and the other three are convertible to volleyball/badminton/table tennis courts, the Weights room, Taekwondo room, and a wall climbing facility.

- Lower Football Field (Br. Gilbert Cotter Field)

La Salle Green Hills also has a full-sized football field, named after Brother Gilbert Cotter FSC, an American De La Salle Brother who used to handle LSGH and was closely tied to football. This is where football matches are held (mostly by the school's varsity team) as well as field demonstrations in school festivities. The football field was temporarily closed due to the newly planned construction of the new Senior High School, International Baccalaureate, and Performing Arts Building.

- Enrique K. Razon Jr. and Batch 1978 Activity Center

The Enrique Razon Activity Center (ERAC) is situated at the upper field. It is designed to suit a wide range of sports activities (e.g., basketball, volleyball, tennis, etc.) and other co-curricular activities/assemblies.

Other facilities situated in the Upper Field include the Track Oval, Baseball Diamond, Lawn Tennis Court, Swimming pool, Wall climbing facility, Table Tennis room and a Golf Driving Cage.

=== Libraries ===
- Main Library

The Main Library of LSGH is located in the quadrangle area located at the Br. Arnold Reche Building. It has the Filipiniana section, Easy Reading, Cyberquest, Reference and Fictional and Non-Fictional sections. Its facilities include internet and printing.

- Annex Library

The Annex Library is located in the St. La Salle Building Annex and is used mainly by Grade 4–6 and is off-limits to the lower grades (Grade 2 and 3). It has most of the services of the Main Library but no longer includes the Easy Reading Section.

- High School Library

The High School library is located on the ground floor of the High School Building and is used only by the High School. It has the same services as the Annex Library but also includes the Leisure Reading area where comics and digests can be found. It is the biggest library in the campus. The GHArchives (Green Hills Archives) and the HS Audio – Visual Center, and ANHS collection are also housed in this library.

=== Spiritual activities and development facilities ===
Since La Salle Green Hills is a school dedicated to the formation of Christian gentlemen, the school has provided facilities for the spiritual activities and development of its students.

La Salle Green Hills has three chapels, the St. La Salle Chapel, the High School Chapel, and the Chapel of the Divine Child.

The Chapel of the Divine Child (formerly called the National Shrine of the Divine Child or NSDC), or the CDC is the school's main chapel. Wakes (for deceased faculty, alumni, brothers, etc.) are often held here. The chapel also serves Sunday masses. This is also where the Grade 3 classes have their First Holy Communion every December–February. The CDC is the place where ZTE scandal witness Jun Lozada held a press conference concerning the scandal.

Large community gatherings such as the community mass are held at the gym.

==== Retreat House complex ====
The Retreat House is situated behind the Kinder One building. It can house two simultaneous class recollections. (Note: One class in the 1st floor, Another in the 2nd floor, thus making the Retreat House capable of handling two retreats at once.) The two-story building has identical facilities on both floors: Conference room which can be converted to a chapel, dining hall, kitchen, dormitory, showers, and lavatories. The dormitories are furnished with bunk beds which can accommodate a class of about 55 (full) and is air-conditioned.

== Extra-curricular ==
=== Performing arts ===
LSGH holds plays, concerts and activity days in each grade level (where students recite short stories and poems, and give speeches in English and Filipino). Most of these events are held at the now Bro. Rafael Donato Center for the Performing Arts, or in the old St. Joseph's Auditorium (the name of the Bro. Donato Center before renovation).

La Salle Green Hills has clubs for those who want to partake in plays, the Junior Actor's Guild (JAG) in the Grade School and the Cue Drama Club in High School. These clubs hold about 3 plays per year and are held in the Bro. Donato Center.

=== The Kundirana ===

The school is also home to The Kundirana, which is a music ministry composed of about 8–15 high school students in their junior or senior year. The Kundirana name is a combination of 2 forms of traditional Filipino music the Kundiman, and the Harana. The LSGH Kundirana has performed several renowned concerts since its establishment in the 1970s. The Kundirana is the most famous high school singing group in the Philippines. Notable alumni include award-winning Filipino musical artists such as notable Lasallians Gary Valenciano, Ogie Alcasid, Randy Santiago, Dingdong Avanzado, Rannie Raymundo, Juan Miguel Salvador, Louie Ocampo, Mel Villena, Tats Faustino, Mikoy Morales, and several notable music industry personalities of the Philippines.

The group performs several concerts aiming to raise funds to contribute to various Philippine charities such as the Bahay Pag-Asa, and several other charities spearheaded by the De La Salle Christian Brothers.

The group celebrated its 40th anniversary in November 2011 with a grand reunion concert held at CCP led by Ogie Alcasid entitled: KUNDIRANA KWARENTA NA: the men, the music, the ministry featuring several alumni, and the then-current batch, Kundirana 2012.

=== AirForce ===
LSGH Airforce is the school's representatives for the field of Streetdance. Airforce consists of students from the LSGH High School, selected through tryouts. They reached and placed first in the finals of the Skechers Streetdance Battle Year 6 and Year 8. Airforce won championships in 2015, 2016, 2017, 2018, 2019 and 2024, in the National Dance Championship "Senior Mixed Hip Hop Division", becoming the first team to do so. LSGH AirForce won the Championship at the Dance Supremacy 2024 Kings High School Division, and later triumphed another victory in the National Dance Championship 2024, competing in the "Senior Mixed Hip Hop Division" yet again.

=== Athletics ===

The varsity team of La Salle Green Hills is called the La Salle Junior Greenies. The name is also used when representing the De La Salle-College of Saint Benilde Blazers in the NCAA as their junior counterpart, contrary to the popular perception that they are Junior Blazers. They were also the juniors representative of the De La Salle Green Archers in the NCAA from 1968 to 1981. La Salle Green Hills' former varsity name was the LSGH Rangers. There are several claims as to where the moniker was taken from.

In the NCAA, the Greenies have won 12 Juniors General Championships, eight with DLSU and four with DLS-CSB.

Participation in major collegiate leagues
Years	League	General Championships	Senior team
1968–1981	NCAA	8	De La Salle Green Archers
1998–present	NCAA	4	Saint Benilde Blazers

La Salle Green Hills due to its ties with the De La Salle-College of Saint Benilde in the NCAA, uses the cheers of Benilde in the NCAA, but since LSGH being a La Salle school altogether, uses the cheers of De La Salle University outside the NCAA. (Note: Both variations of cheers are taught to the High School in Physical Education & Health (PE).)

=== Debate ===
In the 1980s, the LSGH-HS dissolved its Debate and Argumentation elective. Hence, there came increasing demand for students interested in the field. Therefore, the school established the Debate Club and the Forensics Guild. The two organizations were independent from each other and used different rooms for training. The Forensics Guild used the then Saint Joseph's Auditorium while the Debate Club used the High School's Maria Pilapil Hall. Both competed in various competitions in Metro Manila, sometimes meeting each other. Most prominent during this period was the Volvo Voice of Democracy. (This was the stage where LSGH alumnus, Hilarion "Ronnie" Henares III, won the prestigious competition in 1967 and where another alumnus, Christian Earl Castañeda, was second runner-up in 2009) However, since SY 2008–2009, LSGH's Student Affairs Central Body took over participation in this contest.

After 2004, the school felt a need to merge both organizations. This was because the members were at a decline and they both had the same objectives and purpose. So, they established Club Rhetorique. At the same time they created the Rhetoric elective for sophomore students. Feeling the need for a more competitive debate institution, LSGH-HS's English Department and students from De La Salle-College of Saint Benilde established the La Salle Debate Team (LSDT) in the SY 2005–2006. The team has autonomy from rules of normal clubs and societies in LSGH and is officially under the Principal's Office, rather than under the Student Activities Coordinator.

The LSDT trained under members of the DLS-CSB debate society from 2005 to 2007 and then under members of the De La Salle University debate society from 2008 to today. The LSDT has gone on to be Quarter-finalists at the 2008 National Asians High School Debate Championship won the Ana Alano Cup at the 2008 and 2012 Philippine Schools Debate Championship and semi-finalist in the same tournament in 2009 and 2010, and quarter-finalist in 2011 as well as advanced to the semi-finals of the Asian Schools Debate Championship

=== History Varsity ===
Under the tutelage of Sir Cortez, Lasallians participated in the IHBB (International History Varsity Bee and Bowl Competitions) winning several awards and maintaining a first place for both the Bee and Bowl across the Middle school to Junior Varsity categories.

== Adult Night High School ==
The LSGH Adult Night High School (ANHS) has a history dating back to the mid-1970s when it was established by the Christian Brothers to provide tuition-free, quality Lasallian education to the marginalized.

== Notable LSGH alumni ==
Bongbong Marcos	GS 1970	President, Republic of the Philippines
Enrique Razon Jr	LSGH-GS 1974, LSGH-HS 78	Multi-Billionaire Tycoon, CEO of International Container Terminal Services, Inc.
Gary Valenciano	LSGH-GS 1978, LSGH-HS 82	dancer, record artist, songwriter, TV host, Movie actor
Gabriel Valenciano		songwriter, singer, dancer, TV host, actor
Ogie Alcasid	LSGH-GS 81, LSGH-HS 85	songwriter, singer, TV host, Movie comedian
Paeng Nepomuceno	LSGH-HS 77	The only Filipino Guinness Book Record Holder in Bowling in 3 categories, World Champion Bowler
Robert Ace Barbers		politician
Francis "Kiko" Pangilinan	LSGH-HS 81	politician, senator
Rico Hizon	LSGH-GS 1980, LSGH-HS 1984	BBC World News Multi-awarded Business Analyst and Anchor
Francis Zamora	LSGH-GS 1991, LSGH-HS 1995	Mayor of San Juan, Metro Manila and Former UAAP champion of the DLSU Green Archer
Emilio Ramon Ejercito	LSGH-GS 78, LSGH-HS 81	former Governor of Laguna Province and movie actor
Justin Marc S.B. Chipeco	LSGH-HS 1992	former Congressman of the 2nd District of Laguna, incumbent mayor of Calamba
Mike Enriquez	DLS-GS 1964, LSGH-HS 1968	multi-awarded newscaster/ news show host, Vice President of GMA Network
Chel Diokno	LSGH-GS 1974, LSGH-HS 1978	lawyer, law professor, Dean of the DLSU College of Law
Dingdong Avanzado	LSGH-GS 1981, LSGH-HS 1985	singer, songwriter, actor, TV host
Gian Magdangal	LSGH-HS 1999	singer
Edu Manzano	LSGH-DLSU 1979	Former Vice-Mayor of Makati City, Multi-awarded movie actor, TV talk show host, comedian, commercial endorser, and fashion brand model
Bongbong Marcos	LSGH-GS 1970	17th President of the Philippines, former Senator, former Congressman, and former Governor of Ilocos Norte. The first La Salle alumnus President of the Philippines.
Louie Ocampo	LSGH-HS 1977	Notable composer, musical director, jingle writer
Raymart Santiago	LSGH-HS 1990	actor, TV host, movie director
Ralph Recto	LSGH-HS 82	politician/senator
Randy Santiago	LSGH-HS 79	actor, comedian, singer, songwriter, television host
Mark Leviste	LSGH-HS 1995	politician, Vice Governor of Batangas
AJ Perez	LSGH-GS 2007, LSGH-HS 2011	actor
Albie Casiño	LSGH-GS 2007, LSGH-HS 2011	actor
Nix Nolledo	LSGH-GS 1990, LSGH-HS 1994	Chairman and President of Xurpas Inc.
Stephen Fernandez	LSGH GS 1981, LSGH HS 1985	Olympic Medalist (Taekwondo) Champion and DLS-CSB Sports Director
Enzo Pineda		dancer, actor, TV host, singer
Kobe Paras		Former LSGH basketball player and ad model
Andre Paras		ad model, actor, comedian, TV host, and LSGH basketball player
