= Mandaue City Science High School =

Public high school in Mandaue, Philippines

Mandaue City Science National High School

Location
- Mandaue City, Cebu; Philippines
- Coordinates: 10°20′06″N 123°56′39″E

Information
- School type: Public Science High School
- Established: 1996
- Principal: Ms. Glesby S. Camangyan
- Grades: 7 to 12
- Enrollment: 400+ (JHS and SHS)
- Colors: White , Green
- Nickname: SciHi, ManSci, MCSNHS

Mandaue City Science National High School (MCSNHS) is a secondary school founded in 1996 in Opao, Mandaue City, Philippines. It transferred to Ibabao-Estancia, Mandaue City in 2008.

== History ==
Mandaue City Science National High School, originally named Mandaue City National Science and Technology High School, started its operation during S.Y. 1996 - 1997 in response to the directive of the DECS Secretary Ricardo T. Gloria It was created to give Mandauehanons access to the best education that caters the need of students who excel in Science and Mathematics.

It is a secondary school which has a special curriculum that provides a more intensive and advanced program, especially in Science and Mathematics. It is a school for more promising students with the objective of fostering the problem-solving approach of critical thinking.

The first intake of MCSNHS was composed of 25 students who had superior abilities in science and mathematics. They graduated from different public elementary schools in the city and were rigidly screened and interviewed by the DECS, Mandaue City ESI in Science, Mr. Rigel Devena, who himself campaigned and disseminated the information on the opening of a science high school in the division.

The first batch of students was mostly honor pupils from their respective schools. In fact there were several valedictorians and salutatorians in the group while the rest were honorable mentions.

A full force of Comprehensive teachers took good care of the Science High Students and painstakingly taught them even if it meant an overload since there were no teachers available, then. The advisers of Science High Students were: Mrs. Editha Cinco, Mrs. Dalisay Lumapas, Mrs. Beatriz Vicente, and Mrs. Teresita Garbo. These teachers motivate the future scientists to engage in activities and contests which were either academic, sports-related, or cultural in nature. They excelled in these undertakings and started making a name for the school.

Mrs. Lucilin Suan, former principal of MCCNHS, succeeded Mr. Rigel Devena in the division and in the case of the Science High School. She did the selection and interview of the second batch composed of 20 students and the third batch composed of 20 students.

In 1998, former Mandaue City Schools Supt. Dr. Gloria Pinili pointed out the need to make MCSNHS independent and gain recognition from the Bureau of Secondary Education. At the beginning of this plan to separate MCSNHS, Dr. Pinili chose a very dynamic administrator whom she saw would ably hold the reins of the division's show-windows on quality education. Mr. Marcelo Inot was picked from the many administrators on the bases of his educational and intellectual qualifications, and his leadership potential.

By S.Y. 1999–2000, Mandaue City Science National High School weaned itself from its first foster school and started operating independently. Occupying one of the buildings of DGLLOMNHS, it is now composed of 5 classes with 70 students in the first year, 24 in the second year, 20 in the third year, and 22 in the graduating class, a total of 136 students. They are mentored by 10 young and strong teachers picked equally from strong high schools in Mandaue City.

Since then the school has carved a name for itself as it gained honor and recognition through the students' very good performance in contests and other activities. With the support of the division staff, especially Mrs. Lucilin Suan and Mrs. Milagros Ouano as well as the officials of the barangay headed by Barangay Chairman, Joy Mangubat and the government of Mandaue City headed by Mayor Thadeo Ouano, MCSNHS is bound to reap more.

== Class sections ==
Grade	Sections
7	Discartes (former), Newton, Einstein
8	Euler (former), Archimedes, Mendel
9	Faraday (former), Pythagoras, Galileo
10	Bernoulli (former), Pascal, Aristotle
11	Marie Curie (former), Pierre Curie (former), Curie, Kepler
12	Darwin, Rutherford

== Curriculum ==
MCSNHS has a curriculum that provides an intensive and advanced program with special reference to Science, English and Mathematics, MCSNHS also provides SPFL French, and Research as electives.

== Retention ==
To be retained in the MCSNHS, students should maintain an overall weighted average of at least 87% provided that no rating in any grading period in Math, English and Science of below 87% and below 85% in other related subjects.
