= Xavier School =

Roman Catholic Chinese school in Metro Manila, Philippines

- 光启学校 (Chinese)

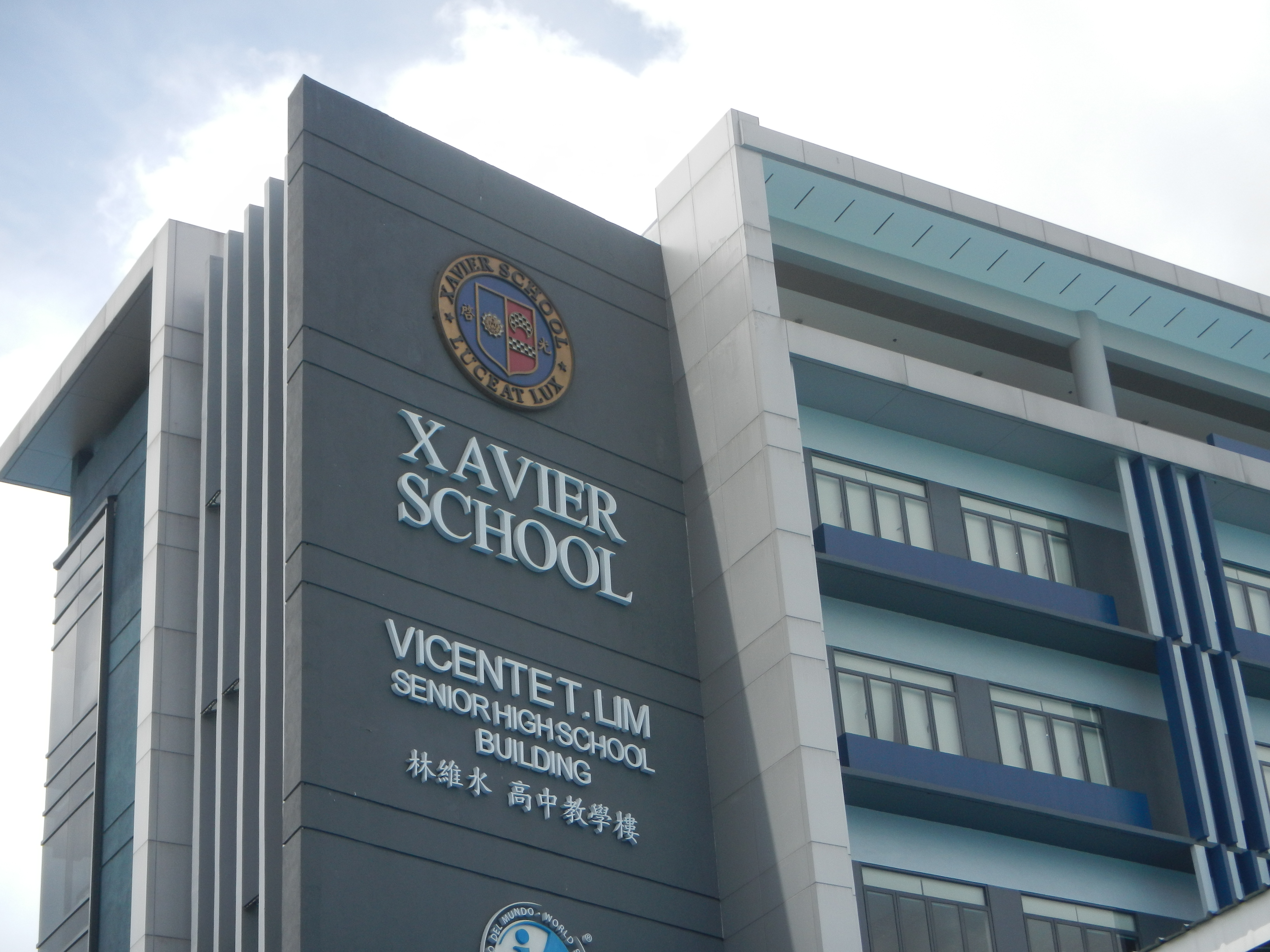
- Senior High School building

Location
- San Juan, Metro Manila; Philippines; 14°36′15″N 121°02′25″E

Information
- Former names: Kuang Chi School
- Type: Private, college preparatory school
- Motto: Latin: Luceat Lux; English: Let your light shine!
- Religious affiliation: Roman Catholic (Jesuits)
- Established: June 6, 1956; 70 years ago
- Founders: Fr. Jean Desautels, SJ; Fr. Louis Papilla, SJ; Fr. Cornelius Pineau, SJ
- President: Fr. Joseph Haw, SJ
- Chairman: Johnip Cua
- Principal: Ma. Theresa Nebres-Ladrido (High school); Jay Perez (Grade School); Frederick Perez (Nuvali Campus)
- Grades: Pre-K to 12
- Gender: All boys (San Juan Campus); Coeducational (Nuvali Campus)
- Enrollment: 4000+
- Campus: Urban: Main San Juan campus 7 hectares (70,000 m^{2}) 64 Xavier St., San Juan Metro Manila; Satellite Nuvali Campus 15 hectares (150,000 m^{2}) Conservation Ave. Nuvali, Canlubang, Calamba, Laguna
- Colors: Blue and gold
- Athletics: Thirty teams in twelve sports
- Athletics conference: MMTLBA, PAYA, FASAAPS, BEST Passarelle JAM
- Mascot: Hoofy the Golden Stallion
- Nickname: Golden Stallions
- Rival: La Salle Greenhills
- Accreditation: International Baccalaureate, PAASCU
- Newspaper: Stallion (High School), Hoofprint (Grade School)
- Affiliations: JBEC EDSOR Consortium
- Alma Mater Song: "Luceat Lux"
- CEEB Code: 705640
- Website: www.xs.edu.ph www.xsn.edu.ph (Nuvali campus)

Xavier School (Filipino: Paaralang Xavier; simplified Chinese: 光啓学校; traditional Chinese: 光啓學校; pinyin: Guāngqǐ Xúexìao; Pe̍h-ōe-jī: Kong-khé Ha̍k-hāu; abbreviated as XS) is a private, Catholic, college preparatory school run by the Catholic Order of the Society of Jesus. Its main campus is at 64 Xavier Street, Greenhills, San Juan, Metro Manila, Philippines. It has a southern satellite campus along West Conservation Avenue in Nuvali, Canlubang, Calamba, Laguna mainly aimed to serve financially challenged students. It is a K-12 school with a curriculum that includes a mandatory Chinese language program. It also offers the International Baccalaureate Diploma Programme as an optional track for students in Grade 11 and 12.

A Catholic institution with an English curriculum and Chinese studies, Xavier School continues educating Chinese-Filipinos as part of its original mission to evangelize them and promote their integration into Philippine society. Through its Grant-in-Aid program, the school also offers financially challenged but otherwise qualified students an opportunity of attaining a Xavier education.

Unlike other Chinese schools in the Philippines, Xavier School was founded as an all-boys institution. Its San Juan campus continues to admit only male students. Its newer Nuvali campus is coeducational.

== History ==
Many Jesuit missionaries who were expelled from China in 1949 found a new home and mission in the overseas Chinese communities in the Philippines. To facilitate their evangelization of the Chinese communities, the Jesuits decided to set up schools. One of those schools was in downtown Manila. Begging for donations by going door-to-door in Chinatown, Fr. Jean Desautels, S.J., a French-Canadian Jesuit who was part of the China mission, received financial aid from Basilio King and Ambrose Chiu, two Chinese-Filipino businessmen who wanted to help set up a Jesuit school for the Chinese.

After soliciting the necessary funds to buy a piece of land for the school campus, the Jesuits proceeded to negotiate with land owners in downtown Manila. At 3:30 pm on December 15, 1955, Fr. Desautels closed a deal and purchased a land, an hour and a half before the 5:00 pm deadline set by its seller, Mr. Ronald M. Bagasbas. The group of Jesuits led by the late Frs. Jean Desautels, Louis Papilla, and Cornelius Pineau went on to found a School and named it Kuang Chi School after Paul Hsü Kuangchi, a 16th-century Chinese nobleman and Minister of Rites during the Ming Dynasty who converted to Christianity and supported its spread in China. On June 6, 1956, in a converted warehouse in Echague, Manila, the school opened its doors to its initial batch of students – 170 children of Chinese immigrants in the Philippines. The school was renamed later on as Xavier School after St. Francis Xavier, co-founder of the Society of Jesus and one of the first leaders of Jesuit missions in China

The school celebrated its Golden Jubilee in 2006. Hoofy, the school's mascot, was in attendance during the celebration. In 2022 The school commenced face to face classes by starting HYFLEXS. In 2023, Fr. Joseph Haw, SJ was elected president of the school and in the following year, assumed the position of school president after the end of the term of Fr. Aristotle Dy, SJ.

As of 2026, Fr. Joseph Haw, SJ has been reelected by the board of directors as the President of Xavier School.

== Status ==
Being a Jesuit school helped establish the school's reputation. In 1960, Xavier School transferred to a 7-hectare property in Greenhills, San Juan, then only an area of rice fields and grasslands. Within a decade, the outlying areas became home to many Xavier families. The campus is a complex of 12 buildings housing over 4,000 students from nursery to high school.

It is one of the few basic education institutions in the Philippines to receive a 7-year accreditation, the longest possible period, and one of only three institutions, along with De La Salle University and Ateneo de Manila University, to receive the Level III accreditation for both the grade school and high school by the Philippine Accrediting Association of Schools, Colleges, and Universities. In January 2010, Xavier School was granted International Baccalaureate (IB) World School status.

== Admissions ==
Admission to Xavier School is extremely competitive. Generally, students enter Xavier as kindergarten students, but may also enter as high school freshmen (Grade 7), by taking the Xavier High School Entrance Examination. Transfer students are occasionally accepted but the requirements are incredibly high.

== Athletics ==
Xavier School fields over thirty teams in twelve sports including basketball, football, badminton, volleyball, swimming, among others.

== Mascot ==
In 1973, the school put forward a contest to create a mascot. From several nominations from various students, and a fierce fight between the "Honey" Bear, "Babaleboo" Bear, and Golden Stallion, the Stallion was chosen to represent the students that the school bred. Years later, the official caricature of the school Mascot, Hoofy, was created in the school year 2002 to 2003. It was designed by David Gonzales of the class of 2005. A life-size model of Hoofy goes around campus, and is available for performance at special events.

== Awards ==
- Xavier's Dance X is the champion of the 2006 Skechers Street Dancing competition (High School division).
- The Xavier Football club won 3rd place in the 2006 Alaska Football Cup.
- The Xavier School team, composed of David Hwang, Zachary Sy, and Philbert Tan, all of Batch 2019, bested hundreds of students across Southeast Asia in the 2017 University of Technology Sydney (UTS) International Technology Innovation Competition. Representing the Philippines, they won the Judges' Choice Award for Streetflow, a smart streetlight system.
- Xavier School's chess team won the finals of the Philippine National Chess Tournament (PNCT) against James Tacloban Memorial High School in 2019.
- The Xavier Debate Team is the school’s official debate club and participates regularly in national debate tournaments. At the Philippine Schools Debate Championship (PSDC), the largest debate competition in the country, the team has won championships in 2007, 2012, 2016, and 2017, with grand finalist placements in 2006, 2011, 2018, 2019, and 2025. Additionally, at the National Asians High School Debate Championship (NAsHDC), the second largest debate tournament in the country, the team won consecutive titles in 2006, 2007, and 2008, and were grand finalists in 2005, 2019, and 2024.
- The Xavier School Varsity Frisbee Team won the Frisbee National Championship (FNCPH) in 2026.

== Incidents ==
Sometime past noon on November 12, 2014, a Grade 11 student from Xavier High School was seen sitting on the ledge on the fifth floor of the school building. The school authorities immediately called the San Juan City Rescue Team, the Philippine National Police (PNP), and the Bureau of Fire Protection (BFP) for help. After about an hour of speaking to the authorities, the boy agreed to get back inside the building. Based on the police investigation, the boy wanted to jump off the building due to family problems. The incident was recorded by ANC as authorities are seen attempting to convince the boy to not jump. The video and the news article published by ANC news has since been since deleted as of December 20, 2021. Many speculate this to be forced censorship by Xavier School authorities to protect the reputation and name of the school.

Just after the Grade School closing ceremony on March 20, 2024, a fire broke out in the main campus building. No injuries were reported and the fire was out within an hour. A Facebook post by the school stated that the cause of the fire was yet to be determined, and as of February 2025, the cause of the fire has not yet been disclosed.

== Notable alumni ==
- Lawrence "Larry" Que, Jr. (1965) — bioinorganic chemist, former chief editor of the Journal of Biological Inorganic Chemistry (1999–2020), Regents Professor at the University of Minnesota, and member of the National Academy of Sciences
- Harry C. Angping (1968) — politician
- Robert S. Wang (1968) — diplomat
- William “Bill” K. W. Li (1969) — oceanographer
- Michael L. Tan (1969) — medical anthropologist, veterinarian, writer, professor, and former chancellor of the University of the Philippines Diliman (2014–2020)
- Henry "Big Boy" T. Sy, Jr. (1970) — vice chairman of SM Investments Corporation, chairman of SM Prime Holdings, chairman and CEO of SM Development Corporation, vice chairman of the National Grid Corporation of the Philippines, and eldest son of late business tycoon Henry Sy
- Hans T. Sy (1973) — philanthropist, former SM Prime Holdings president, chairman of Chinabank, and second son of late business tycoon Henry Sy
- Marcos Juan Bruno "Mark" O. Cojuangco (1974) — politician
- Vicente "Vincent" S. Pérez, Jr. (1975) — banker and former secretary of energy (2001 - 2005)
- Herbert T. Sy (1975) — director of SM Prime Holdings and third son of late business tycoon Henry Sy
- Harley T. Sy (1976) — executive director of SM Investments Corporation, vice chairman of SM Retail, and youngest and fourth son of late business tycoon Henry Sy
- Jeffrey Reginald T. Ching (1977) — classical music composer
- Carlos "Charlie" O. Cojuangco (1980) — politician
- Willie T. Ong (1981) — cardiologist, internist, and media personality
- Gilberto Eduardo Gerardo "Gibo" C. Teodoro, Jr. (1981) — politician, 2010 Philippine presidential candidate, current secretary of national defense (2023–present)
- Lance Y. Gokongwei (1983) — head of Gokongwei group, president and CEO of JG Summit Holdings, chairman of Robinsons Retail, vice chairman of the Manila Electric Company (Meralco), and eldest son of late business tycoon John Gokongwei
- Lucio "Bong" K. Tan, Jr. (1983) — businessman, basketball coach, former president of Philippine Airlines, eldest son of business tycoon Lucio Tan
- Arthur "Art" C. Yap (1983) — politician
- Jefferson “Jeff” G. Cheng (1984) — businessman and football administrator
- Edwin Marino C. Ongchuan (1985) — politician
- Karl Joseph Gregory S. Roy (1985) — lead singer of rock bands Kapatid and P.O.T.
- Tobias Reynald "Toby" M. Tiangco (1985) — politician
- Francisco "Kiko" P. Tiu Laurel, Jr. (1985) — politician, current secretary of agriculture (2023–present)
- Jose Francisco "Kiko" B. Benitez (1986) — politician
- Juan Pablo "Rimpy" P. Bondoc (1986) — politician
- Frederick “Deck” D. Go (1986) — politician, former Special Assistant to the president for Investment and Economic Affairs, current secretary of finance (2025–present)
- Michael John "Jack" R. Duavit (1987) — politician
- Joseph Victor "JV" G. Ejercito (1987) — politician
- Carlo Joaquin Tadeo L. Katigbak (1987) — president and CEO of ABS-CBN Corporation
- Juan Edgardo "Sonny" M. Angara (1989) — politician, current secretary of education (2024–present)
- John Reynald M. Tiangco (1990) — politician
- Ricardo Carlos "Rico" C. Yan (1992) — actor
- Dakila Carlo "Dax" E. Cua (1995) — politician, governor of Quirino Province, Philippines
- Eric Rommel "Jugs" D. Jugueta (1996) — actor, guitarist and vocalist of The Itchyworms, and host of It's Showtime
- Kelvin U. Yu (1996) — bassist and backing vocalist of The Itchyworms and entrepreneur
- Karl Kendrick T. Chua (1996) — economist, former director-general of the National Economic and Development Authority (NEDA)
- Andrew James "Drew" E. Arellano (1997) — actor and TV show host
- Rexlon "Rex" T. Gatchalian (1997) — politician, current secretary of social welfare and development (2023–present)
- Kennevic C. Asuncion (1998) — badminton player
- William Irwin C. Tieng (1998) — politician
- Weslie "Wes" T. Gatchalian (1999) — politician
- Mark Aeron H. Sambar (1999) — politician
- Juan Carlos Miguel Mendoza (2000) — Olympic swimmer
- Michael Cristopher "Cris" R. Mathay (2000) — politician
- Markwin L. Tee (2001) — ten-pin bowler
- Joseph Henry L. Yeo (2001) — basketball player
- Tyrone Conrad "TY" U. Tang (2002) — basketball player and UAAP champion
- Christopher John "Chris" A. Tiu (2003) — basketball player and entrepreneur
- Benedict S. Kaw (2005) — actor, known professionally as Benedict Campos
- Charles A. Tiu (2007) — basketball coach
- Juan Emilio "Jake" E. Ejercito (2008) — actor
- Gabriel "Gab" M. Banal (2008) — basketball player
- Francis Joseph "Kiko" A. Dee (2009) — political analyst
- Jeric Allen U. Teng (2009) — basketball player
- Javier Miguel "Javi" L. Benitez (2012) — politician
- Jeron Alvin U. Teng (2012) — basketball player
- George Isaac Y. Go (2014) — basketball player
- Louis Raphael "Ralph" V. Cu (2015) — basketball player
- Christian Tyler C. Tio (2016) — basketball player
- Jose Diego M. Aspiras (2022) — football player

== See also ==
- List of Jesuit schools
