= National Asians High School Debate Championship =

Debate tournament in the Philippines

The National Asians High School Debate Championship, more popularly known as NAsHDC, is a debate tournament in the Philippines sponsored by the De La Salle University-Manila. It is one of two national debate tournaments in the Philippines, the other being the Philippine Schools Debate Championship sponsored by the Ateneo de Manila University.

Every year after its inception in 2003, NAsHDC has consistently expanded in participation and support. Former partners include the Children's Museum and Library Incorporated (CMLI) and the Friedrich Naumann Stiftung (FNS). The tournament is also consistently supported by the National Youth Commission (NYC) and endorsed by the Department of Education. In 2008, the tournament was renamed the Manila Bulletin National Asians High School Debate Championship in light of the Manila Bulletin being the NAsHDC co-presenter.

In 2018, De La Salle University-Manila, in partnership with Unilab and Business Mirror, hosted NAsHDC again after a 7-year hiatus.

In NASHDC 2026, the La Salle Debate Society added the Veridian Cup Category. Debaters from Visayas and Mindanao are eligible to compete in the said category. However, the category did push through to have a finals series and instead only awarded the Top 3 Veridian-eligible speakers in the preliminary rounds. The continuation of the category in future iterations is still unknown.

== Tournament Format ==
NAsHDC uses the Asian Parliamentary debate format. It is a 3-on-3 parliamentary debate style that was founded in 1994 in University of Tasmania, Hobart, Australia. There is a separate novice division in NAsHDC.

== Past Champions and Grand finalists ==
| Year | Champion | Grand Finalist | Champion Team Members | Grand Finalists |
|---|---|---|---|---|
| 2003 | Immaculate Conception Academy-Greenhills A | Claret School of Quezon City A | Charisse Borromeo, Jennifer Ong, Larissa Co | Wendell Batocabe, Dino de Leon, Paul Anido |
| 2004 | Ateneo de Manila High School A | PAREF Southridge School A | Miko Biscocho, Claude Gomez, Mikee Victoriano | RG Macalinao, Mikki Albano, Miguel Reyes |
| 2005 | Miriam College B | Xavier School A | Angelica Mangahas, Anna Arcellana, Maita Guevara | Jonathan Loh, Peterson Poon, Nathan Santos |
| 2006 | Xavier School A | Claret School of Quezon City A | Patrick Cocabo, Evan Chen, Peterson Poon | Alistair Zosa, Jed Hernandez, Gemmo Fernandez |
| 2007 | Xavier School A | PAREF Woodrose School A | Peterson Poon, Evan Chen, Kenneth Reyes | Abby Castelo, Chrissa Magat, Pat Austria |
| 2008 | Xavier School A | Xavier School B | Vito Borromeo, Carlo Borromeo, Martin Qui | Walter Cheng, Gabriel Kho, Gregory Uy |
| 2011 | St. Scholastica's College, Manila A | PAREF Southridge School A | Mikee de Vega, Jari Monteagudo, Crissy Aquino | JV Valerio, Mark Lozano, Raffy Tanpho |
| 2018 | Ateneo de Manila Senior High School A | De La Salle Zobel A | CJ Carlos, David Africa, Kara Angan | Gabby Dimatatac, Ken Alunan, Desher Empeño |
| 2019 | Ateneo de Manila Senior High School B | Xavier School A | Carlo Pastor, Bea Legaspi, Matthew Varona | Kyle Go, Eaton Sia, Luke de Ocampo |
| 2021 | Ateneo de Manila Senior High School A | Philippine Science High School- Main Campus MMM | Lois Naomi Ang, Anton Alfonso Abiera, David Bejarin | Ram Mayo, David Mencias, Hugh Mejos |
| 2022 | De La Salle Zobel A | Ateneo de Manila Senior High School A | Clarisse Tan, Yzza Keana Sering, Leonna Ricci Ronquillo | Daniella Louise Barbacena, Ira Noelle Concepcion, Aliah Venice Garcia |
| 2023 | Ateneo De Manila Senior High School A | British School Manila C | Samuel Tango, Jasmin Ang, Kristen Reyes | Caitlin Gaw, Alexa Rae Chua Tan, Tyrone Serapio |
| 2024 | PAREF Southridge School A | Xavier School A | Azarel Tanoja, Geoff Biscocho, Jacob Ty | Jack Lim, Sean Angeles, Tyler Lim |
| 2025 | Immaculate Conception Academy-Greenhills B | University of Santo Tomas Senior High School A | Annika Wenceslao, Niña Biteng, Isabel Lee | Arjay L. Sampang, Migz Rafael D. Valimento, Tehya Myiesha T. Fernando |
| 2026 | Ateneo de Manila Senior High School A | De la Salle University Senior High School A | Xyza Dazon, Thirdy Santiago, Sophia Caguiat | Ana Singson, Xhian Alsola, Keisha Chu |

=== Past Novice Champions ===
| Year | Novice Champions | Team Members | Grand Finalists | Team Members |
|---|---|---|---|---|
| 2006 | University of Baguio Science High School A | Janine Alexis Go, Rachelle Beatriz Malong, Dawn Elizabeth Niekamp | | |
| 2007 | Colegio de San Juan de Letran A | Gian Carlo Labo, Jeffrey Arboleda, Juan Rafael Roque | | |
| 2008 | Makati Hope Christian School A | Krisha Lim, Harvey Chua, Nicole Cordoves | | |
| 2018 | De La Salle University Senior High School D | Chloe Elma, Dorothy Tuazon, Ichiro Arbole | Grace Christian College A | Timothy Tyler Uy, Vanessa Tiong, Kyla Chuasiaokong |
| 2021 | Philippine Science High School- Main Campus ACM | Neomi Inciso Mendoza, Hanz Isaac Arnaldo, Stephen Chua | MGC New Life Christian Academy A | Franxine Uel Cawaon, Jasmin Grace Ang, Grace Denise Gaw |
| 2022 | Ateneo De Manila Senior High School F | Jamie Carelle Antonio, Anika Kristin S. Cajigal, Therese Felicia Bernal | De La Salle University Senior High School D | Lyndsay Patalinghog, Mahdi Angelo C. Lababidi, Isagani Miguel A. Ranillo |
| 2023 | De La Salle University Senior High School E | Aaron Lee, Stephanie Mariano, Marielle Emily V. De Luna | Philippine Science High School - Main Campus B | Chael Matthew V. Sze, Aris Matthew Ocania, Colin Michael O. Wong |
| 2024 | De La Salle University Senior High School C | Gian Carlo Campo Montuno, Joaquin Carlos Rabat Francisco, Zenaida Victoria Alejandra Milanes Ilao | Philippine Science High School - Main Campus X | Amelia Robang, Jhoenica C. Gellido, Heidrique Kristof Sumogba |
| 2025 | Miriam College High School B | Sophia Bautista, Caleigh Naoe, Gianna Tango | Ateneo de Manila Senior High School C | Samantha Claire Huang Dionisio, Dominic Lorenzo B. Siosana, James Leonard P. Arzaga |
| 2026 | University of Santo Tomas Senior High School A | Tristan Papas, Sage Raijin Cañizares, Tera S. Perez | University of Santo Tomas Senior High School B | Karanne Reyes, Jaira Perlas, Liam Bolalin |

=== Past Open Best Speakers ===
| Year | Overall Best Speaker (Preliminaries) | Grand Finals Best Speaker | Novice Best Speaker (Preliminaries) | Novice Finals Best Speaker |
|---|---|---|---|---|
| 2003 | Anna Santos - Philippine Science High School - Diliman Campus | | | |
| 2004 | Miko Biscocho - Ateneo de Manila High School | | | |
| 2005 | Angelica Mangahas - Miriam College | | | |
| 2006 | James Soriano - Ateneo de Manila High School | | | |
| 2007 | Evan Chen - Xavier School | | | |
| 2008 | Carlo Borromeo - Xavier School | | | |
| 2011 | Anton Sison - Ateneo de Manila High School | | | |
| 2018 | David Africa - Ateneo de Manila Senior High School | CJ Carlos - Ateneo De Manila Senior High School | Michaela Lim - Immaculate Conception Academy | Chloe Elma - De La Salle University Senior High School |
| 2019 | Kyle Go & Eaton Sia - Xavier School | | | |
| 2021 | Lois Naomi Ang - Ateneo de Manila Senior High School | Naomi Ang - Ateneo De Manila Senior High School | Caitlin Gaw - MGC New Life Christian Academy | Hanz Arnaldo - Philippine Science High School- Main Campus ACM |
| 2022 | Clarisse Tan - De La Salle Zobel | Clarisse Tan - De La Salle Zobel | Annika Chua - De La Salle University Senior High School | |
| 2023 | Cara Reyes - Immaculate Conception Academy | Sam Tango - Ateneo De Manila Senior High School | Mary Reyes - De La Salle University Senior High School, Alexa Tan - British School Manila, | Aaron Lee - De La Salle University Senior High School |
| 2024 | Ramya Espiritu - Saint Paul College Pasig | Geoff Biscocho - PAREF Southridge School | Zoe Dacara - St. Paul College Pasig | Joaquin Fransisco - De La Salle University Senior High School |
| 2025 | Kimberly Co - Homeschool Global | Niña Biteng - Immaculate Conception Academy-Greenhills | Migz Rafael D. Valimento - University of Santo Tomas Senior High School | Dominic Lorenzo B. Siosana - Ateneo de Manila Senior High School |
| 2026 | Xyza Dazon - Ateneo de Manila Senior High School A Niña Biteng - Immaculate Conception Academy A | Ana Singson - De la Salle University Senior High School A | Ana Singson - De la Salle University Senior High School A | Sage Raijin Cañizares - University of Santo Tomas Senior High School A |

=== Past Veridian Cup Best Speakers ===
| Year | Overall Best Speaker (Preliminaries) |
| 2026 | Ysabo Beluan - Philippine Science High School - CARAGA Region Campus in Butuan City |

|- | |}
