= Philippine Science High School Caraga Region Campus =

Public high school in Butuan, Philippines

Philippine Science High School - Caraga Region Campus
- Aerial view as of June 2025

Location
- D.O. Plaza Regional Center, Brgy. Ampayon; Butuan, Agusan del Norte; Philippines
- Coordinates: 8°58′34″N 125°35′57″E

Information
- Type: specialized public high school
- Established: 2014
- Campus Director: Dr. Melba Patacsil
- Grades: 7 to 12 (Complete High School)
- Nickname: PSHS-CRC / Pisay Caraga
- Affiliation: Department of Science and Technology
- Admission: National Competitive Examination
- Website: crc.pshs.edu.ph

The Philippine Science High School - Caraga Region Campus (PSHS-CRC) is the 13th campus of the Philippine Science High School System located at Brgy. Ampayon, Butuan. The school admits and grants scholarships to students who are gifted in science and mathematics. It caters to scholars from Caraga which covers the provinces of Surigao del Norte, Surigao del Sur, Dinagat Islands, Agusan del Norte, and Agusan del Sur. Some scholars come from nearby provinces of Region X. A few from other regions of the country. The PSHS-CRC formally opened in June 2014.

== History ==
The family of former Philippine Vice President Teofisto T. Guingona Sr. donated a five-hectare parcel of land to the Philippine Science High School last April 1, 2013. Due to an identified geo-hazard of the proposed site, the City Government of Butuan under former Mayor Dr. Ferdinand Amante offered a new 5-hectare land in the DO Plaza Government Center, Barangay Ampayon, Butuan City. The Campus's 1st Campus Director, Dr. Ruwina S. Gonzaga, was at the helm of the operation which started at the Caraga State University - Main Campus in the same barangay. Classes officially started in school year 2014–2015.

Construction of the first school buildings started in the new site in 2014. The Campus was transferred to its current site in SY 2017-2018.

On March 28, 2019, Engr. Ramil A. Sanchez, was sworn in as the 2nd Campus Director. Engr. Sanchez assumed leadership at the height of massive infrastructure projects. The Campus has achieved major transformation from the former rice fields to becoming Caraga's premiere secondary school specializing in Science, Technology, Engineering and Mathematics (STEM).

On March 31, 2026, Dr. Melba Patacsil replaced Engr. Ramil A. Sanchez as the campus director. Dr. Patacsil was previously a teacher at Philippine Science High School - Cordillera Administrative Region Campus in Baguio City, where she taught chemistry since joining the school in 2011.

== Sources ==
3. "Strong STEM learning pushed in Caraga Region " https://www.pna.gov.ph/articles/1180929
