= Quezon Science High School =

Public high school in Quezon, Philippines

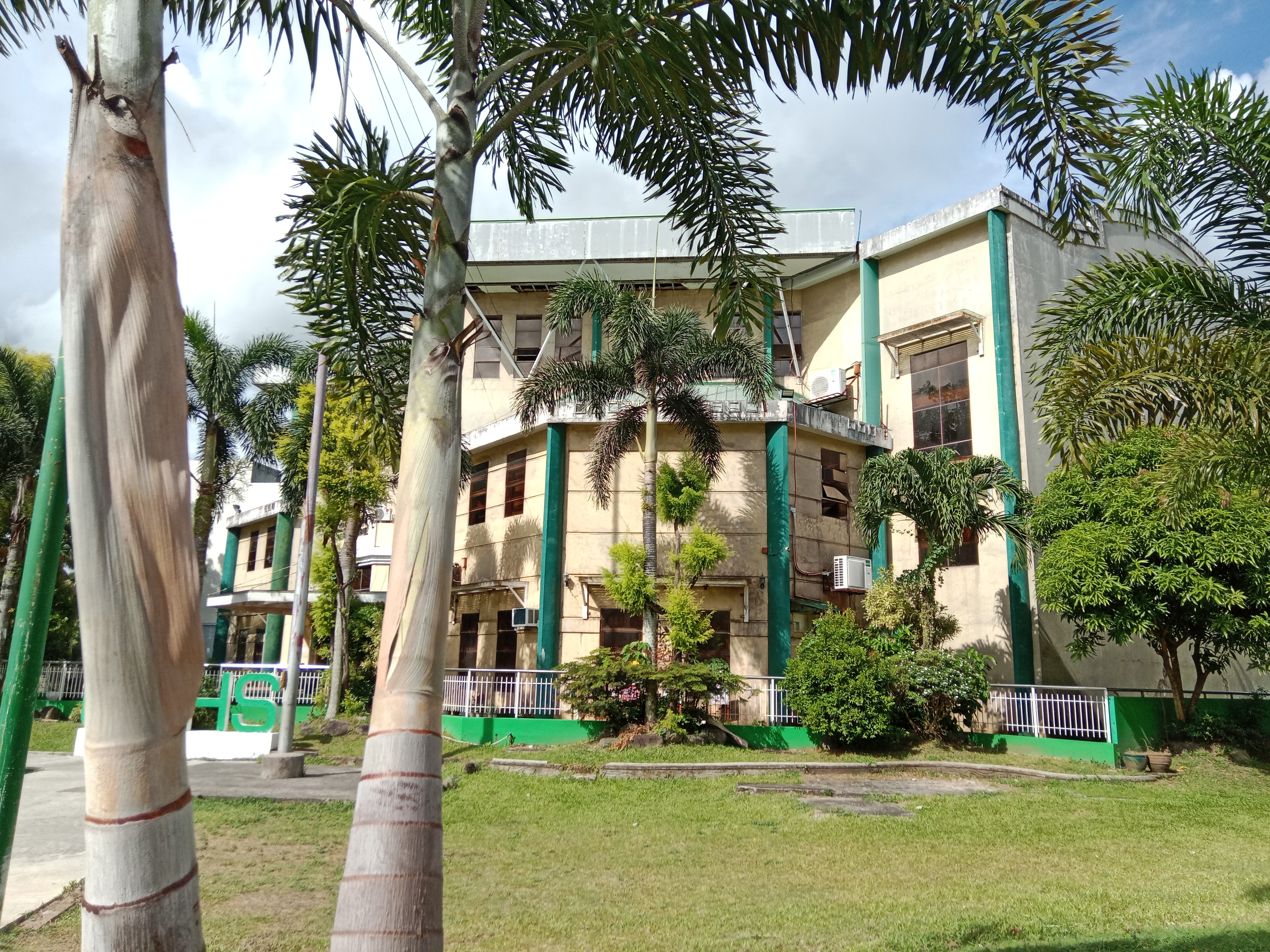
- QSHS Main Building (front)

Location
- Maharlika Highway, Brgy. Isabang; Tayabas, Quezon; Philippines
- 13°57′42″N 121°34′08″E

Information
- Type: Public Science
- Motto: Honor. Excellence. Service.
- Established: 2011
- Principal: Dr. Cynthia P. Cuya
- Grades: 7 to 12
- Nickname: Quesay, QScie, QSHS
- Newspaper: Ang Velocity; The Velocity
- Affiliation: Republic of the Philippines; Department of Education; Region IV-A (Calabarzon); Division of Quezon
- Website: qshsedu.wixsite.com/qshs

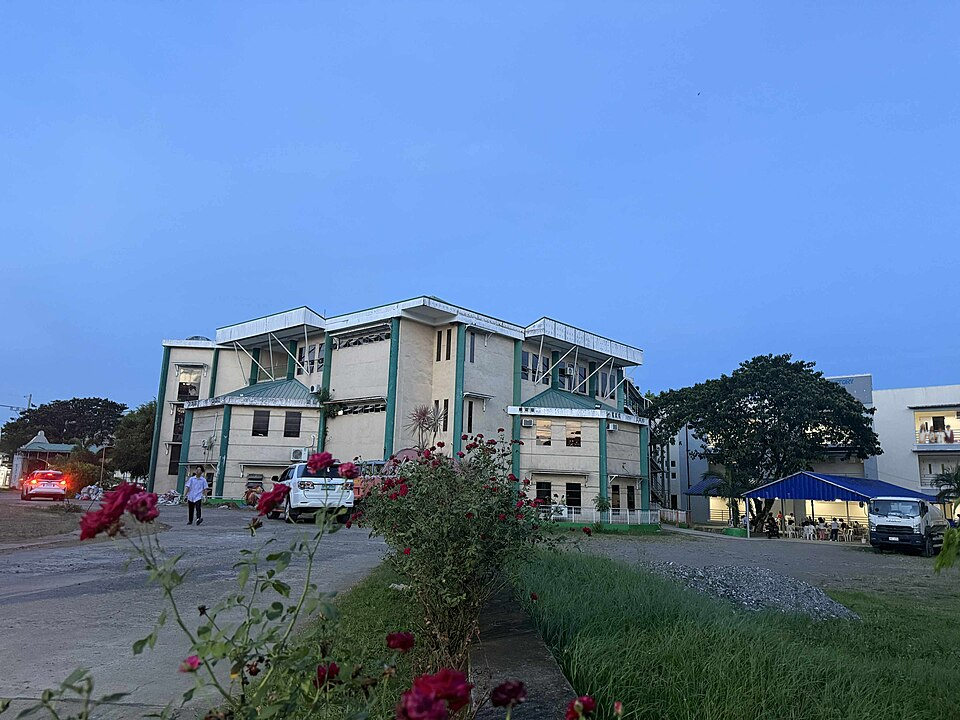
QSHS Main Building (back)

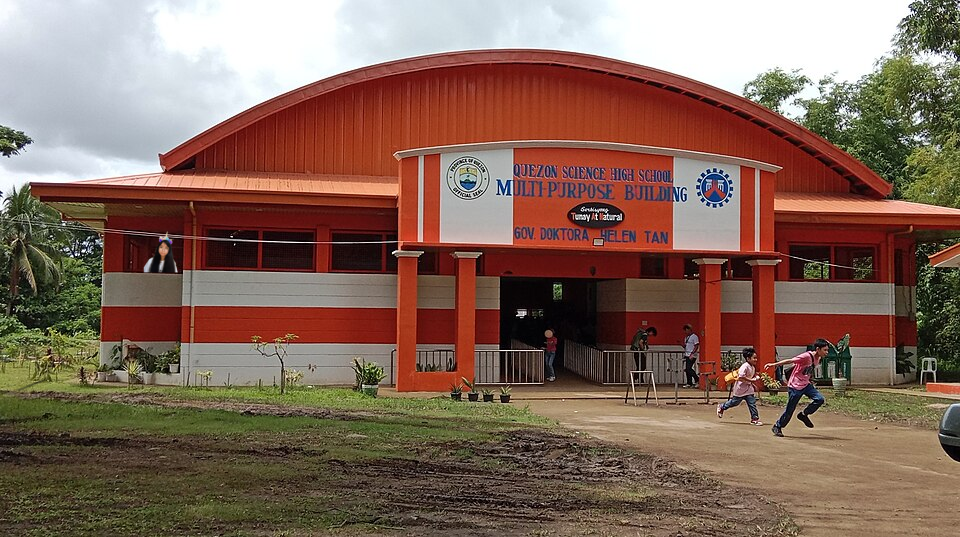
QSHS Multi - Purpose Building

Quezon Science High School (QSHS, QueScie/QueSci, Kisay or Quesay) is the provincial secondary Science High School of Quezon, located along the diversion road of the Maharlika Highway inside a 3.7-hectare government property in Barangay Isabang, Tayabas City in the province of Quezon. It was founded on 2011, admitting 80 students from all over the province and 40 more in 2022 who passed the Quezon Science High School Admission Test (QSHSAT) provided with complete scholarship offering free tuition fees, board and lodging, foods, uniforms, and other miscellaneous school fees.

== History ==
The building of the Quezon Science High School, which was constructed during the administration of Quezon governor Rafael Nantes administration, was originally intended to be a science museum but according to Governor David Suarez the plans were dropped due to competition from other museums in Metro Manila. In 2010, Gloria Potes, then school division superintendent, made a suggestion to Suarez to convert the building to a science high school. The building was also planned to be converted to a call centre but the plan likewise didn't push through due to lack of local manpower. The proposal was accepted since Quezon was the only province in the Calabarzon region not to have a science high school at that time. The school was inaugurated on August 17, 2011. QSHS held its first commencement ceremony last March 2015, having 71 students graduating.

== Sections ==
As the 120 students are divided into three for each class to have 40 students each, they will be assigned to a section according to how well they did at the QSHAT (homogeneous, former way used) or they will be assigned randomly (heterogenous, current). In addition to the school's science relation where the education uses STEM–based curriculum (Science, Technology, English and Mathematics), the school uses stars as the name of the sections. With the addition of 40 additional students for batch 13 entering school year 2023-2024, a new section (Castor) has been added placed in the old computer lab on the second floor of the main building.

- Grade 7 - Pollux, Vega & Castor
- Grade 8 - Rigel, Altair & Spica
- Grade 9 - Polaris, Sirius & Bellatrix
- Grade 10 - Betelgeuse, Antares & Capella
- Grade 11 - Andromeda & Auriga
- Grade 12 - Perseus & Orion

== Facilities ==
The school has facilities such as an E-library, a computer laboratory, and a science laboratory. It has classrooms for grades 7, 8, and 10 in the main building, a Senior High School Building, and the Grade 9 building. It also has a Multi-Purpose Building. The first floor of the main building consists of the director's and secretary's offices, the science lab, the computer lab, the activity area and the main faculty office for junior high school. The second floor comprises the library, the classrooms for Grades 7 and 8, and the guidance counselor's office. The third floor was a makeshift dormitory before the other one was erected; it has the YFD office, Grade 10 classrooms, and it has a wide space area, sometimes considered as another activity area. The Grade 9 Building hosts the rooms for Grade 9, and the audio-visual room. The senior high school building has the classrooms for Grades 11 and 12. Behind the main building is the dormitory building, hosting the cafeteria and canteen rooms on the ground floor. Outside the dormitory is a seating area for eating.

== Dormitory ==
It now has its own three-story dormitory, a project of Governor Suarez, boarding all the priority students from all over the province. The former dormitory is located at the third floor of the main building. It was officially opened in November 2014.

== The Garden of Knowledge ==
On August 10, 2015, the Garden of Knowledge was inaugurated and blessed. It features plants, some only found in Quezon Province, essential for the students knowledge in Agricultural Science. It was a project by Governor Suarez once again, alongside his wife.

On the school year 2023-2024, it was removed.

== Senior High School ==
Senior High in Quezon Science High School is closed to outsiders; meaning only students who passed the QSHSAT and studied in QSHS starting Grade 7 are allowed to take SHS in QSHS. In the beginning of SY 2016–2017, QSHS formally implemented Senior High School with the STEM (Science, Technology, Engineering, and Mathematics) Academic Strand for its first batch of Grade 11 students. By SY 2017–2018, the number of students have increased.
