= Immaculate Conception Academy =

Immaculate Conception Academy (ICA)
- City of Dasmariñas, Philippines

Information
- Status: Active
- Grades: Pre-school, Grade 1 to Grade 6, Grade 7 to 12)
- Language: English; Filipino
- Colours: Blue & White
- Nickname: ICA
- Website: www.ica-dasmarinas.edu.ph

Immaculate Conception Academy, Dasmariñas (ICA Dasmariñas) is a private, nonsectarian educational institution in Dasmariñas, Philippines. It is owned and managed by the school board of directors.

== History ==
Immaculate Conception Academy, Inc., Dasmariñas, Cavite was first organized in October 1947. It opened its first classes of 1st year and 2nd year high school education in June 1948 with a total of 67 students. The first classes were held at the church convent of the Immaculate Conception Parish Church of Dasmariñas. Later, the school acquired a vacant lot adjacent to the church and built its first two-story building in 1956. In 1979, a 2-hectare (4.9-acre) lot in Ibayo was acquired and a building was built to facilitate the Industrial Arts and Physical Education classes. This is also the site for Vocational education.

A one-story building was also rented near the plaza, which was used as the school office, canteen and one room, but it was eventually demolished. For that matter, the school decided to add third, fourth and fifth floors on the original ICA building, which is now the ICA-SHS. In June 1992, ICA preschool was created following the Montessori system of teaching. Its location is at Pasong Lawin, Dasmariñas, Cavite. Today, ICA has four campuses in Dasmariñas: ICA West on Ibayo, ICA South on Langkaan, ICA Plaza/Science High School in Poblacion and ICA East in Burol .

== Athletics ==
ICA is a member of the National Collegiate Athletic Association (NCAA) Philippines. The Immaculate Conception Academy (ICA) is paired as the junior (high school) varsity team of the Emilio Aguinaldo College (EAC). The EAC-ICA Brigadiers is the junior team of EAC Generals.

Aside from participating in different ball games and leagues, ICA is also proud of the AllStars Cheering Squad. This team won 5th Best Team and Most Intensive Routine for High School Coed Cheer Division and National Champions for High School Girls Cheer Division during the National Cheerleading Championships held at Ynares Sports Arena on March 5, 2011. ICA AllStars is the 1st non-NCR high school team to be national champions. This team earned different awards and championships in their hometown leagues.
