= University of Baguio Science High School =

Private high school in Baguio, Philippines

Location
- Baguio; Philippines; 16°24′59″N 120°35′54″E

Information
- Type: Private, Nonsectarian
- Motto: Verbum sat sapienti (One word is enough for the wise)
- Founded: 1963
- Founder: Emmett Brown Asuncion
- Principal: Dr. Antonio P. Mangaliag
- Grades: 7 to 12
- Colors: Red and Gray
- Slogan: "Where Great Minds Meet"
- Song: Science High Loyalty Song
- Nickname: UB Sci, Sci High
- Teams: Greyhounds (Sports); Sonus Conexus (Choir)
- Publication: Gazette (English); Alluyon (Filipino)
- Affiliation: University of Baguio
- Website: www.ubaguio.edu

The University of Baguio Science High School (UBSHS) is a private, nonsectarian science high school. It is the science department of the University of Baguio and was founded in 1963, predating the Philippine Science High School which was established in 1964. The school is considered a pioneer among private science high schools in Asia.

== History ==
In 1963, a special examination was administered to sixth grade students from the City. The passers of this exam were put in a Special Science Scholars Section (SSSS). This promulgated an annual scholarship examination that formally established the UB Science High School as an institution of specialized secondary education. The school's pioneer batch graduated in 1967.

In 1970, the school received its legal recognition.

With the implementation of the K to 12 program in 2013, the school has since established the Senior High School department which exclusively offers the Academic Track with the following strands: Science, Technology, Engineering & Mathematics (STEM), Accountancy, Business & Management (ABM), and Humanities & Social Sciences (HUMSS).
