= Mandaue City Comprehensive National High School =

Public high school in Mandaue, Philippines

Location
- Demetrio M. Cortes St., Brgys. Centro and Looc (Plaridel St., Reclamation Area), Mandaue City 6014
- Coordinates: 10°19′29″N 123°56′37″E

Information
- Type: Public Secondary Comprehensive School
- Established: February 25, 1986
- Principal: Emily A. Binggas
- Grades: 7 to 12
- Enrollment: 5,000+ per year (day & night classes)
- Nickname: Comprehensians, Compre
- Color(s): Pink, White
- Website: www.facebook.com/mccnhsofficial

The Mandaue City Comprehensive National High School (MCCNHS) is a public secondary comprehensive school of the City of Mandaue, Cebu. It has two campuses, the main (located in Brgy. Centro) and the annex (situated in Brgy Looc). The annex campus is located behind the Norkis Park and access to the other side can be had by way of a covered pedestrian overpass which spanned DM Cortes St. The main campus is situated between the Mandaue City Engineer's Office Building (south) and the Department of Education Mandaue City Division Building (north).
